= Desaulniers =

Desaulniers is a Québécois surname. Notable people with the surname include:

- Abraham Lesieur Desaulniers (1822–1883), politician in the Quebec, Canada
- Alexis Lesieur Desaulniers (1837–1918), Quebec lawyer and political figure
- Arthur Lesieur Desaulniers (1873–1954), merchant and political figure in Quebec
- Brianne Sidonie Desaulniers or Brie Larson (born 1989), American actress and singer
- Élise Desaulniers, author of several French-language books
- François Lesieur Desaulniers (1785–1870), Quebec farmer and political figure
- Francois Severe Lesieur Desaulniers (1850–1913), politician in the province of Quebec, Canada
- Gerry Desaulniers (1928–1984), retired Canadian professional ice hockey forward
- Louis Leon Lesieur Desaulniers (1823–1896), Quebec physician and political figure
- Marcel Desaulniers (1945-2024), American chef, cookbook author, director Emeritus of the Culinary Institute of America
- Michael Desaulniers, former World No. 1 hardball squash player from Canada
- Napoléon Désaulniers, local politician in Shawinigan, Quebec
- Roland Désaulniers, local businessman and politician in Shawinigan, Quebec

== See also ==
- Desaulniers, Ontario
- Saulnier (disambiguation)
- Saulnières (disambiguation)
