= François Roy =

François Roy (1896–1970) was a local politician in Shawinigan, Quebec. He was the 12th Mayor of Shawinigan, Quebec from 1946 to 1954.

Roy was born in 1896 in Rivière-des-Prairies, near Montreal. He successfully ran for mayor in 1946 and was re-elected in 1948 and 1951. The current Shawinigan City Hall (located in downtown Shawinigan at 550 Avenue de l’Hôtel-de-Ville) was constructed in 1948 under his tenure. The structure has an Art Deco architectural style and is similar to the Vancouver City Hall. Roy also unveiled the Monument des Braves. He ran for mayor again in 1963 but lost to Gérard Dufresne.

Roy died in Shawinigan in 1970.

Union des artistes president and actor Raymond Legault performed the role of François Roy for one of La Cité de l'Énergie multimedia shows.

== See also ==
- Mayors of Shawinigan
- Mauricie

Political offices
Preceded by J.A. Bilodeau	Mayors of Shawinigan; 1946–1954	Succeeded by Gaston Hardy
