= Dominique Grenier =

Dominique Grenier (born 1928) was a local politician in Shawinigan, Quebec. He was the 17th mayor of Shawinigan, Quebec from 1970 to 1986.

He was born in Shawinigan on September 13, 1928, married Liette Lafrenière (1932-2019) in 1958 and is the father of three children.

Grenier was a City Councillor from 1969 to 1970. He successfully ran as Mayor of Shawinigan in 1970 against incumbent Maurice Bruneau and was re-elected in 1974, 1978 and 1982. He did not run for re-election in 1986.

Grenier's mayorship was served under difficult circumstances. Many local businesses moved out of town or closed down.

Under his administration, the Parc de l'Île Melville (then known as Parc des Chutes) was reorganized and expanded.

Grenier ran again in 1994, but was overwhelmingly defeated by candidate Lise Landry.

In the late 1990s, he hosted local cable television shows.

== See also ==
- Mayors of Shawinigan
- Mauricie
- Shawinigan, Quebec

Political offices
| Preceded by Maurice Bruneau | Mayors of Shawinigan; 1970–1986 | Succeeded by Roland Désaulniers |
