= Joseph-Alexis Dufresne =

Joseph-Alexis Dufresne was a local politician in Shawinigan, Quebec. He was the seventh Mayor of Shawinigan from 1920 to 1928.

He was born in 1869 near Portneuf, Quebec and was a physician. He moved to Shawinigan in 1901.

Dufresne served as school board member and also as council member from 1902 to 1906 and 1911 to 1913.

He ran for Mayor in Shawinigan in 1920 and won. He was re-elected in 1922, 1924 and 1926.

Under his administration, the following institutions or facilities were put into place:

- Chamber of Commerce and Industrie of Shawinigan;
- Fire station #1 (Place du Marché, Downtown);
- Fire station #2 (2023, avenue Champlain);
- Parc Saint-Marc;
- Union musicale de Shawinigan (the local philharmonic choir).

Dufresne was the Conservative candidate in the provincial district of Saint-Maurice in the 1908, 1912, 1919 and 1923 elections. Each time he lost.

He left active politics in 1928 for health reasons. He died in the same year.

Rue Dufresne in the Saint-Marc neighbourhood was named to honour him.

== See also ==
- Mayors of Shawinigan
- Mauricie
- Shawinigan, Quebec

Political offices
Preceded by Napoléon Désaulniers	Mayors of Shawinigan; 1920–1928	Succeeded by Napoléon Désaulniers
