= J. A. Bilodeau =

Canadian politician (1883–1961)

J.A. Bilodeau (b. March 19, 1883, in Capelton - d. May 14, 1961, in Montréal) was a businessman and local politician in Shawinigan, Quebec. He was the 11th Mayor of Shawinigan Falls from 1938 to 1946.

He was born in 1883 in Capelton, near Sherbrooke, Quebec, the eldest son of Jean Bilodeau and Adèle Turcotte. In 1901, he settles in the community of Baie-de-Shawinigan and works at the aluminum plant of the Pittsburgh Reduction Company, where he eventually becomes foreman. He marries Antoinette Larrivée on June 21, 1904. His wife dies on January 29, 1907. He marries his second wife, Eva Richard on February 4, 1908, in St-Rachel (Bellechasse). Around 1914, he leaves his job at the aluminum company and opens a grocery store on 4^{e} rue (Fourth Street) in Shawinigan Falls. In 1924, he opens groceries wholesaling business, Bilodeau & Fils, which becomes a successful business.

He ran for mayor of Shawinigan Falls in 1936 and 1937, but was defeated. He ran again in 1938 and won against incumbent Alexandre Gélinas. Bilodeau was re-elected in 1940, 1942 and 1944. He did not run in 1946. During his administration, which took place during World War II, a new municipal auditorium, the downtown city market building and a second Shawinigan-based aluminum plant were dedicated and the city decided to build a new city hall. Parc Saint-Marc (now renamed parc Antoine-Saint-Onge) was built and became home of a new public swimming pool.

He died in 1961. He was buried in the Saint-Joseph cemetery in Shawinigan. Rue Bilodeau in the Shawinigan-Nord neighbourhood was named to honour him.

== Notes and references ==
Political offices
| Preceded by Alexandre Gélinas | Mayors of Shawinigan; 1938–1946 | Succeeded by François Roy |
