= Gérard Dufresne =

Canadian politician (1918–2013)

F. Gérard Dufresne, CM ED CD (1918 – 27 January 2013 ) was a well-known local politician and a military officer in Shawinigan, Quebec.

Born in East Angus, Quebec, Eastern Townships in 1918, he got a degree from the Shawinigan Technical Institute and would later make a career as an insurance agent.

== Military ==
Dufresne became a member of the 694 Army Cadet Corps (Collège Immaculée-Conception) in 1933 and then became a reservist with the Régiment de Joliette.

During World War II, he commanded an infantry company in England and served in the Netherlands, with the Régiment des Fusiliers Mont-Royal and in Germany.

After the war, he became the commanding officer of the Shawinigan-based C Company of the Régiment de Joliette.

In 1953, Dufresne was promoted to lieutenant colonel and served as commander of the 62nd (Shawinigan) Field Artillery Regiment, which he had joined in 1948, until 1960.

From 1966 to 2005, he was the Honorary Colonel of the same unit.

In 2006, local military author Captain (ret) Guy Arcand, CD published a book on Gérard Dufresne 'Biographie du Col Gerard F. Dufresne, CM, ED, OSTJ, CD' La Societe d'histoire militaire mauricienne.

== Politics ==
In 1963, Dufresne was elected Mayor of Shawinigan against François Roy.

Under his tenure, the old City Market (located downtown) was demolished to make room for a Woolworth's retail store and Boulevard Royal was extended to the current location of the Biermans movie theater. Also, the construction of the Centre des Arts de Shawinigan (located at 2100 Boulevard des Hêtres and completed in 1967) began.

In 1966, he lost his bid for re-election to Maurice Bruneau.

In 1970, Dufresne was the Liberal candidate in the district of Saint-Maurice. He finished third with 24.3% of the vote, behind Union Nationale incumbent Philippe Demers (36.9%) and Parti Québécois candidate Yves Duhaime (24.4%).

Duhaime had been an officer of the 62nd (Shawinigan) Field Artillery Regiment at the time Dufresne was its commanding officer.

Dufresne is a federalist, a loyal supporter of Prime Minister Jean Chrétien and has remained a card-carrying member of the Liberal Party of Canada for decades.

== See also ==
- 62nd (Shawinigan) Field Artillery Regiment
- Liberal Party of Canada
- Liberal Party of Quebec
- Mayors of Shawinigan
- Mauricie
- Saint-Maurice Provincial Electoral District

Political offices
Preceded by Henri Désaulniers	Mayors of Shawinigan; 1963–1966	Succeeded by Maurice Bruneau
Military offices
Preceded by Lt Colonel Jean Bouvette	commanding officer of the 62nd (Shawinigan) Field Artillery Regiment, RCA; 1953–1960	Succeeded by Lt Colonel Robert Grondin
Preceded by None	Honorary Colonel of the 62nd (Shawinigan) Field Artillery Regiment, RCA; 1966–2005	Succeeded by Ben Weider
