= Michel Angers =

Canadian politician

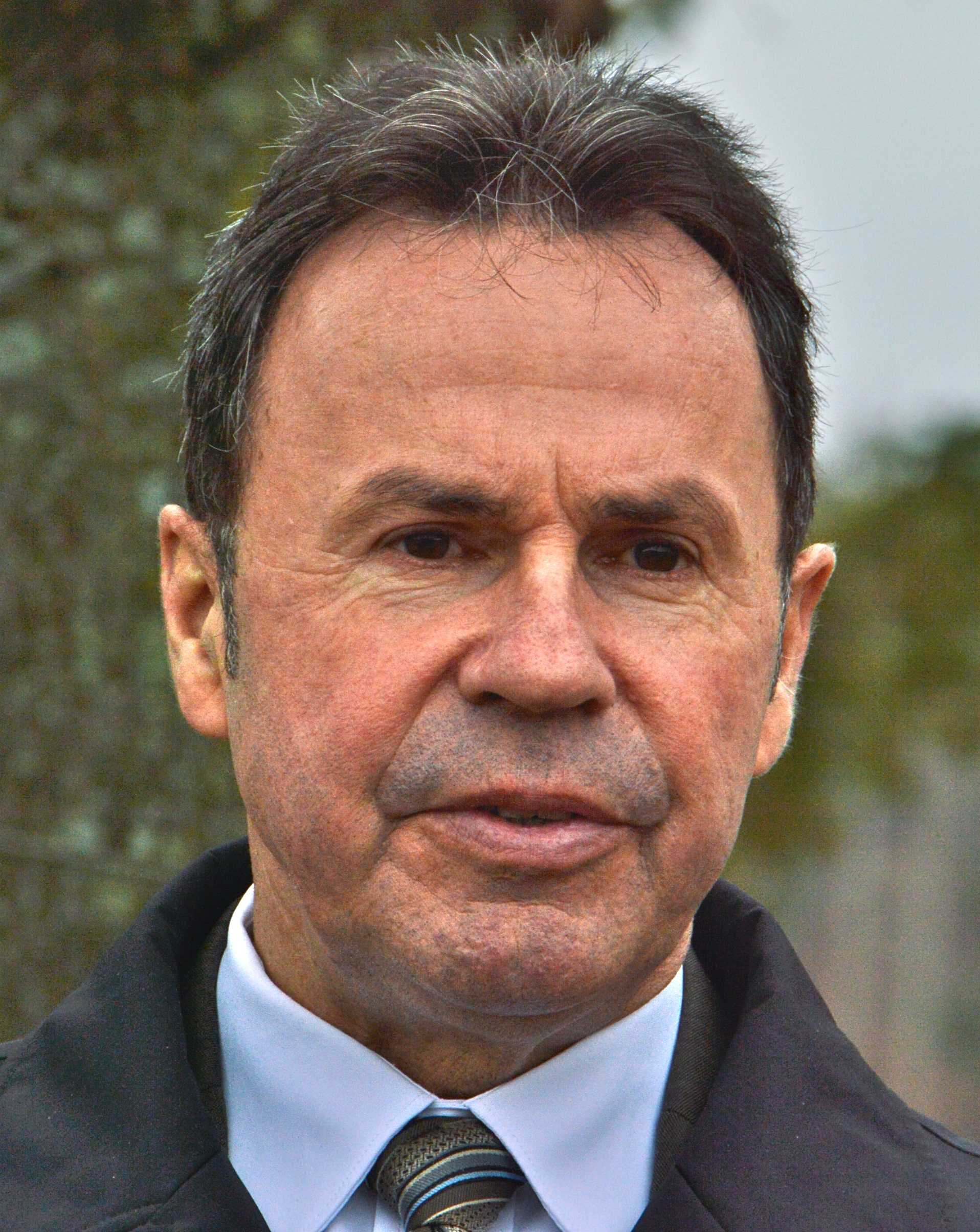
Michel Angers in 2020

Michel Angers is a local politician in Shawinigan, Quebec. He served as the mayor of the city from 2009 to 2025.

== Background ==
He was born on November 2, 1959, and is from the Grand-Mère section of town.

Angers has worked for Alcan. He has a background in organized labour, serving in a leadership position with the local branch of the CSN.

== Mayor of Shawinigan ==
Angers became a candidate for Mayor of Shawinigan in May 2009. He did not run as part of a ticket and expressed the desire to work with whoever the voters would send to city hall. His campaign used the Internet, as the other candidates did. Angers pledged to help creating jobs and proposed the replacement of slums with newer housing or businesses. His opponents accused him of being politically too close to incumbent Lise Landry who supported him.

Picking up key endorsements from local politicians such as Mayor André Garant of Saint-Élie-de-Caxton and former city councillor Maurice Héroux, Angers won the election with 55% of the vote against former PQ provincial cabinet member Yves Duhaime (29%) and Ralliement municipal candidate Claude Villemure (16%).

== Footnotes ==
Political offices
| Preceded by Lise Landry | Mayors of Shawinigan; 2009–2025 | Succeeded by Yves Lévesque |
