= Maurice Bruneau =

Canadian politician (1908-2004)

J.-Maurice Bruneau (1908-2004) was a local politician in Shawinigan, Quebec. He was the 16th Mayor of Shawinigan from 1966 to 1970.

He was born in 1908 in Saint-Maurice, Mauricie and once owned a butcher shop on 5^{e} rue (Fifth Street). He was a member of the Richelieu Club and the Chamber of Commerce.

Bruneau served as a council member from 1957 to 1966.

He ran for mayor in Shawinigan in 1966 against incumbent Gérard Dufresne and won.

Under his administration, the Centre des Arts (2100, boulevard des Hêtres) was completed.

Bruneau ran for re-election in 1970, but was defeated by council member Dominique Grenier.

He died in 2004.

== See also ==
- Mayors of Shawinigan
- Mauricie
- Shawinigan, Quebec

== Footnotes ==
Political offices
Preceded by Gérard Dufresne	Mayors of Shawinigan; 1966–1970	Succeeded by Dominique Grenier
