= Alexandre Gélinas =

Canadian politician

Alexandre Gélinas (1894–1965) was a local politician in Shawinigan, Quebec. He was the tenth Mayor of Shawinigan from 1937 to 1938.

He was born in 1894 in Saint-Barnabé, in the Mauricie region in Quebec, Canada and was married to Laure Lauterreur. Although they never had children of their own, they looked after Nicole Houde who was 12 years old at the time, from 1949 to 1951. She was the niece of Laure and had just lost her mother, Thérèse Laterreur, sister of Laure, to breast cancer.

He studied law in Manitoba and also practiced as a lawyer in that province for a few years. He then returned to his home province of Québec where he founded his own law firm (Lafond, Gélinas) located on 5^{e} rue (Fifth Street). Jean Chrétien, Canada's 20th prime minister, articled and practiced at the firm from 1959 to 1960.

He ran for mayor in the special election that was held on May 3, 1937, to fill the vacancy caused by the death of Lucien Bourassa and won against J.A. Bilodeau. During the time he was mayor, a municipal auditorium and St. Marc Park were built.

He served the remainder of Bourassa's unexpired term. In 1938, he ran for re-election but was defeated by Bilodeau.

He was a long-standing member of Rotary International and a governor of its Shawinigan chapter.

Gélinas died in 1965.

== Footnotes ==
Political offices
Preceded by Lucien Bourassa	Mayors of Shawinigan; 1937–1938	Succeeded by J.A. Bilodeau
