= Lucien Bourassa =

Canadian politician (1884–1937)

Lucien Bourassa (French pronunciation: [lysjɛ̃ buʁasa]) was a local politician in Shawinigan, Quebec. He was the city's ninth mayor, serving from 1936 until his death the following year.

He was born in 1884 in Saint-Barnabé, Mauricie.

Bourassa served as a council member from 1922 to 1926, 1928 to 1930 and 1932 to 1934.

He ran for mayor in 1936 and won, but died in office in 1937. He was succeeded by Alexandre Gélinas.

Avenue Lucien-Bourassa in the Shawinigan-Nord neighbourhood was named to honour him.

== See also ==
- Mayors of Shawinigan
- Mauricie
- Shawinigan, Quebec

Political offices
Preceded by Albert Gigaire	Mayors of Shawinigan; 1936–1937	Succeeded by Alexandre Gélinas
