= Albert Gigaire =

Canadian politician (1872–1959)

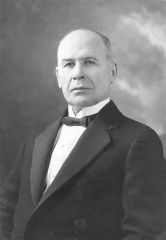
Albert Gigaire

Albert Gigaire (1872-1959) was a police officer, a businessman and a local politician in Shawinigan, Quebec. He was the eighth Mayor of Shawinigan from 1930 to 1936.

He was born in 1872 in Saint-Barnabé, Mauricie.

Gigaire served as a council member from 1918 to 1920.

He ran for mayor in Shawinigan in 1930 and won. Gigaire was re-elected in 1932 and 1934.

Under his administration, which took place during the Great Depression, the following facilities were dedicated:

- The city Water Works Building (the structure still stands at 1843, boulevard des Hêtres);
- Parc Saint-Maurice (the downtown public playground had been completed ten years earlier);
- Sainte-Thérèse Hospital (located at 1705, avenue Georges).

Gigaire did not run in 1936.

He died in 1959.

Rue Gigaire (Gigaire Street) in the Christ-Roi neighbourhood was named to honour him.

== Notes and references ==
Political offices
Preceded by Napoléon Désaulniers	Mayors of Shawinigan; 1930–1936	Succeeded by Lucien Bourassa
