= Bilodeau =

Bilodeau is a surname. Notable people with the name include:

- Alexandre Bilodeau, skier
- Brent Bilodeau, ice hockey player
- Émile Bilodeau (born 1996), Canadian singer-songwriter
- Gilles Bilodeau, ice hockey player
- J. A. Bilodeau, politician
- Jean-Luc Bilodeau, actor
- Joseph Bilodeau, politician
- Tyler Bilodeau, American basketball player
- Yvon Bilodeau, ice hockey player
- Vincent Bilodeau, comedian and actor

== See also ==
- Cass Bauer-Bilodeau, basketball player
- Jacynthe Millette-Bilodeau, pop singer
