= 62nd Field Artillery Regiment, RCA =

62nd Field Artillery Regiment, Royal Canadian Artillery
- Active: 1961 as Field Artillery Regiment
- Country: Canada
- Branch: Royal Regiment of Canadian Artillery
- Role: Field Artillery

The 62nd Field Artillery Regiment, RCA (French: 62^{e} Régiment d'artillerie de campagne, ARC) is a militia unit of the Canadian Army that has its own military band and is located in Shawinigan, Quebec. It recruits primarily in Shawinigan, Joliette and Victoriaville.

== Origin ==
Its oldest and most notable subunit is the 81st Field Artillery Battery, which was founded in the Eastern Townships in 1912 and relocated in Shawinigan, Mauricie in 1936.

== World War II ==
The battery was called to active duty during World War II. Its members were trained in Ontario and the United Kingdom from 1940 to 1944. In 1944-45, the 81st Battery contributed to the Allies' effort in the Normandy Landings, which led to the Liberation of France.

== Anti-aircraft Unit ==
In 1946-48, members of the Shawinigan-based C Company of the Régiment de Joliette joined those of the 81st Battery to form the 62nd Regiment. From that moment until 1961, the newly formed unit served in an anti-aircraft capacity.

== Field artillery ==
Since 1961, the regiment has been a field artillery unit. Its equipment consists of 105 mm towed howitzers. Its armoury is currently located at 5315 Boulevard Royal, Shawinigan.

A substantial number of the 62nd Regiment reservists attend Collège Shawinigan.

Every year on Remembrance Day weekend, members of the regiment gather near the Monument des Braves cenotaph and conduct a ceremony to commemorate soldiers who died on the field of honour. They also parade in the streets of downtown Shawinigan and Grand-Mère.

== Contributions since World War II ==
Even though the 62nd Regiment has not served in active duty since World War II, it provided personnel for a number of operations, including:

- United Nations Peacekeeping Force in Cyprus (UNFICYP);
- the Oka Crisis in Montérégie;
- United Nations Protection Force (UNPROFOR) in Former Yugoslavia;
- the War in Afghanistan.

== Well-known members ==
Well-known members of the regiment are:

- Gabriel Chrétien, brother of Prime Minister Jean Chrétien;
- Jacques Duchesneau, Chief of Police of the Montreal Urban Community from 1994 to 1998 and Honorary Lieutenant Colonel of the regiment since 2005;
- Gérard Dufresne, Mayor of Shawinigan from 1963 to 1966 and Honorary Colonel of the regiment from 1966 to 2005;
- Yves Duhaime, Provincial Cabinet Member from 1976 to 1985;
- Jean-Pierre Frigon, history teacher at Saint-Tite's Paul-Le Jeune High School and recipient of the Governor General's Award;
- Antonio Lamer (1933–2007), Chief Justice of Canada from 1990 to 2000 and Honorary Lieutenant Colonel of the regiment from 1992 to 1998;
- Victoriaville native Yannick Pépin (1973–2009), who reached the rank of Master Bombardier with the 62nd Regiment in the 1990s, before joining the 5 Combat Engineer Regiment (Major Pépin died in the line of duty while commanding a unit in the War in Afghanistan);
- Ben Weider (1923–2008), Co-founder of the International Federation of BodyBuilders (IFBB), Jewish businessman from Montreal and Honorary Colonel of the regiment from 2005 until his death in 2008.

== See also ==
- History of the Canadian Army
- List of armouries in Canada
- List of units of the Canadian Army

== Precedence ==
Preceded by 56th Field Artillery Regiment, RCA	62nd Field Artillery Regiment, RCA	Succeeded by Last in precedence of Royal Canadian Artillery Regiments
