= Former Shawinigan Aluminium Plant =

Electrometallurgical facility

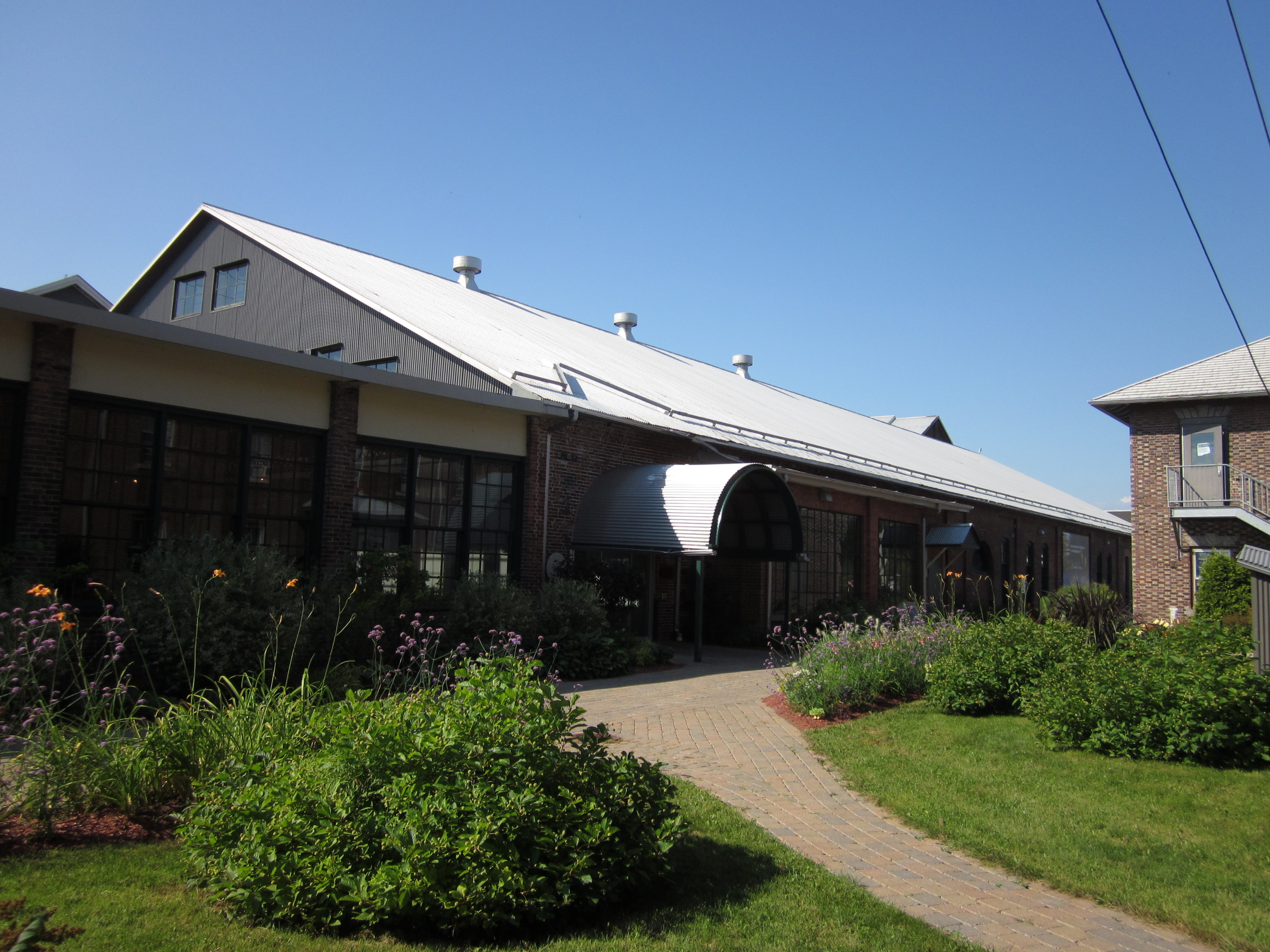
- Building AL-3.
- Interactive map of Former Shawinigan Aluminium Plant
- Location: 1 rue des Érables; Shawinigan, Quebec; Canada
- Coordinates: 46°32′24″N 72°45′49″W
- Type: Aluminum smelting
- Beginning date: 1900-1901
- Heritage: Classified heritage building (2013); National Historic Site (2002)

The former Shawinigan aluminium plant is a decommissioned electrometallurgical facility located in Shawinigan, Quebec, Canada. It consists of 12 industrial and administrative buildings constructed between 1900 and 1927 on a plateau overlooking the Saint-Maurice River, near the Shawinigan hydroelectric complex.

In 1899, the Shawinigan Water and Power Company encouraged the Pittsburgh Reduction Company (later known as Alcoa) to establish operations near its hydroelectric facilities. Construction of the plant began in the spring of 1900, and its design was likely inspired by the Niagara Falls aluminium plant, which was later demolished in 1923. A foundry and a potroom were constructed between 1900 and 1901. On October 20, 1901, the first aluminium ingot in Canada was cast at the site. A wire drawing and cable workshop were added the same year. In 1902, the company established a Canadian subsidiary, the Northern Aluminium Company Limited.

In 1905 and 1906, the Shawinigan aluminium plant underwent expansion with the construction of three additional potrooms, a laboratory with offices, a shipping area, and a coke grinding workshop. A new pot design featuring larger and thicker walls was introduced to enhance heat resistance. Additional buildings were constructed throughout the 1910s and 1920s. In 1925, the Northern Aluminium Company was renamed Aluminium Company of Canada Limited (Alcan). In 1927, administrative offices were added to the complex. During the early 1930s, the facility shifted its focus to producing aluminum cables. Primary aluminium production ended in 1944. Cable manufacturing continued and peaked in the 1960s, followed by a gradual decline that led to the plant’s closure in 1986. In 1989, part of the complex was sold to a neighboring paper mill, and some structures, including one potroom, were later demolished.

In 2001, Alcan transferred the remaining buildings of the former Shawinigan aluminium plant to the Cité de l’énergie, a museum focused on industrial heritage. The site was designated a National Historic Site of Canada in 2002. The buildings were restored and opened to the public in 2003 as Espace Shawinigan, a venue for exhibitions and cultural events. In 2013, the complex was designated a heritage building by the Quebec Ministry of Culture and Communications.

== Location ==
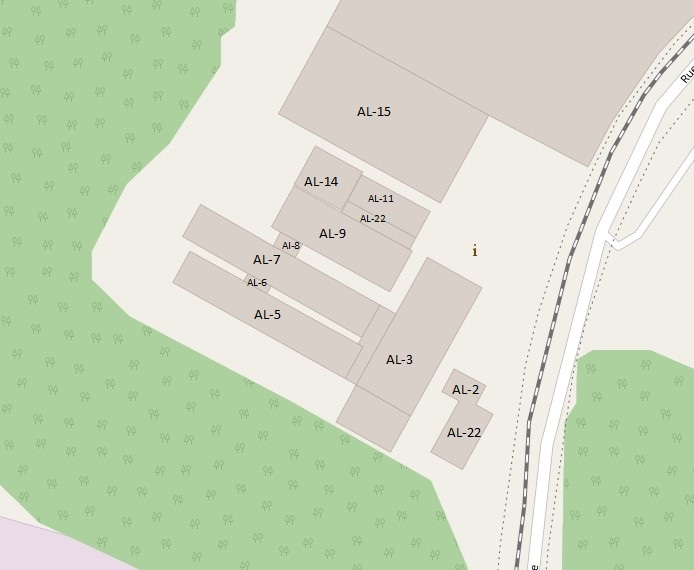
Map of the former Shawinigan aluminum smelter.

The former Shawinigan aluminium plant is located in Shawinigan, Quebec, near Shawinigan Bay, the falls, and the Shawinigan River. The site comprises 12 buildings constructed between 1900 and 1927, (Note: The smelter had more than 12 buildings, but not all of them have been preserved.) including potrooms, a foundry, a wire drawing and cable workshop, laboratories, coke grinding workshops, a shipping area, administrative offices, and annexes connecting the structures.

The complex is situated on a plateau overlooking the Saint-Maurice River. The flat terrain facilitated both the construction of the plant and the development of a railway line serving the site. The plateau forms a natural dike above Shawinigan Bay, channeling the Saint-Maurice River over Shawinigan Falls, which has a 50-meter drop. This waterfall provided favorable conditions for hydroelectric development, meeting the high energy demands of aluminium production and contributing to the plant’s establishment at this location.

Industrial sites generally lack elaborate landscaping. At the Shawinigan aluminium plant, the construction of the railway, access roads, and parking areas removed most of the vegetation at the front of the site. In contrast, vegetation has gradually reestablished itself along the rear and western sections of the complex. This regrowth contributes to soil stabilization in an area previously affected by landslides.

== History ==
=== Construction and development of the plant ===
In 1886, American engineer Charles Martin Hall developed a process for producing aluminium through electrolysis. In 1888, he co-founded the Pittsburgh Reduction Company with metallurgist and industrialist Alfred E. Hunt. Initially relying on steam-powered generators, the company soon adopted hydroelectric power due to its lower cost. In 1895, a production facility was established at Niagara Falls, New York, to take advantage of this energy source.

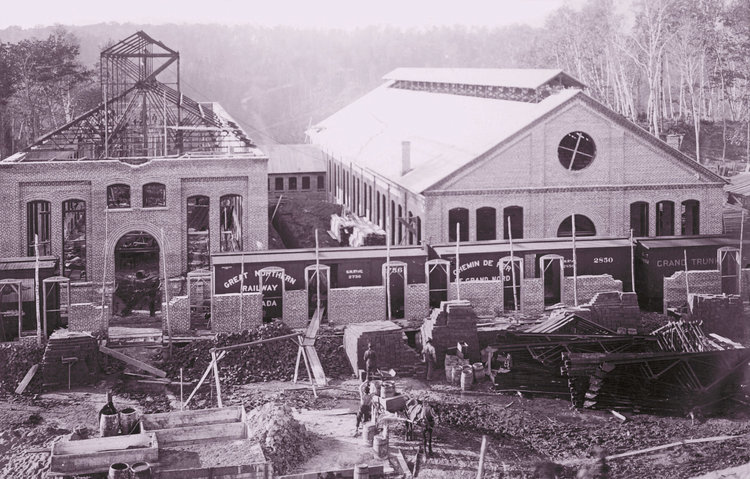
Buildings AL-7 and AL-9 under construction during the summer of 1900.

In 1898, the Shawinigan Water and Power Company secured rights to develop a hydroelectric station at Shawinigan Falls. From the outset, the company aimed to attract energy-intensive industries by offering low-cost electricity. In 1899, it signed its first contract with the Pittsburgh Reduction Company, drawn by affordable energy and access to British Empire markets. That same year, a railway line was constructed to connect the site to the Great Northern Railway of Canada network.

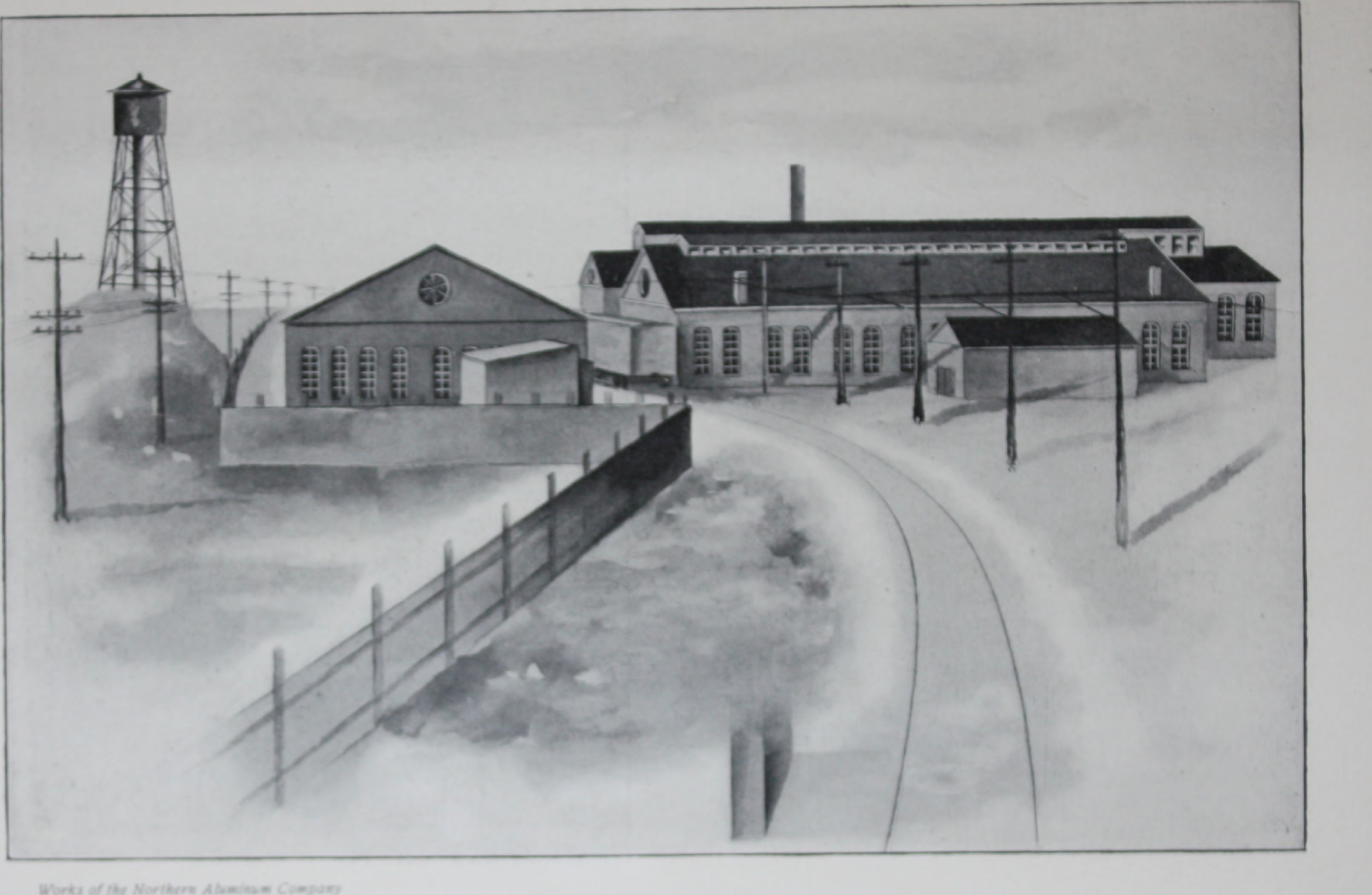
The facilities around 1907.

Construction of the Shawinigan aluminium plant began in early 1900 under the supervision of engineer Edwin Stanton Fickes (1872–1943) and Pittsburgh Reduction Company superintendent F. H. Stoughton. The facility was likely modeled after the Niagara Falls plant, which was demolished in 1923. A foundry (AL-9), a potroom (AL-7), and a connecting annex (AL-8) were completed in 1900 and 1901, along with a hydroelectric plant below the site. Canada's first aluminium ingot was cast on October 20, 1901, and delivered to New Glasgow, Nova Scotia. Production from the 32 Hall-type electrolytic cells stabilized at approximately 900 kg per day. In 1902, the Canadian branch of the Pittsburgh Reduction Company was renamed Northern Aluminium Company Limited. That same year, a wire drawing and cable workshop (AL-3) was constructed. By the end of 1902, the number of electrolytic pots had increased to 44, and daily output reached 2,300 kg, with annual production rising from 128 tonnes in 1901 to 900 tonnes in 1902. In 1907, overhead cranes were installed to facilitate materials handling, and the first Canadian aluminium conductor cables were manufactured at the site. That same year, the Pittsburgh Reduction Company officially became the Aluminium Company of America (Alcoa).

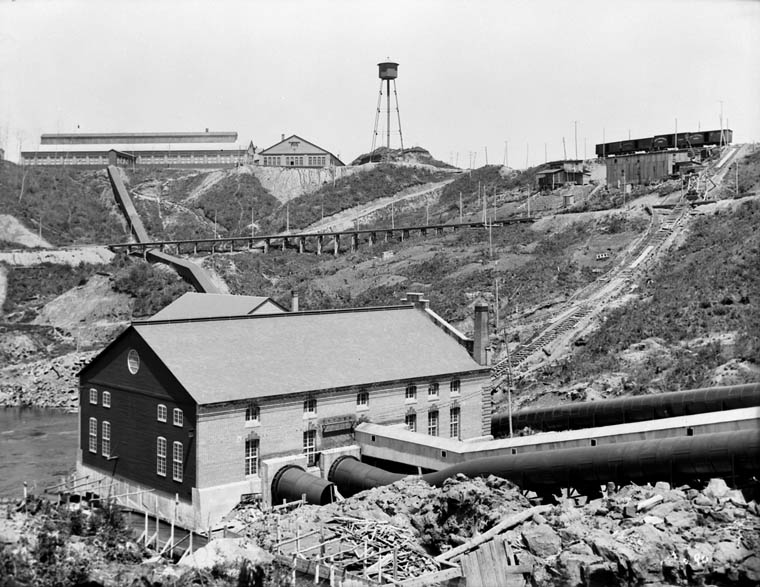
The site in 1910. In the foreground, the Shawinigan-1 power plant with the roof of the N.A.C. power plant in the background. At the top of the hill, the aluminum smelter.

The decreasing cost of aluminium production and the discovery of new applications for the metal contributed to a sustained increase in demand. The first major expansion of the Shawinigan industrial complex occurred in 1905–1906, with the construction of three potrooms (AL-5, AL-15, and AL-17), a combined laboratory and office (AL-2), a shipping area (AL-11), a coke grinding workshop (AL-14), and an annex (AL-6). The potrooms were equipped with overhead cranes, and the buildings were interconnected by annexes or passageways. No new potrooms were added after 1907; however, existing pots were gradually upgraded with more modern technology. Between 1905 and 1907, annual production increased from 1,175 tonnes to 2,686 tonnes. A decline in overseas markets led to a shutdown at the end of 1907, with partial operations resuming in mid-1908. From 1909 to 1916, production grew from 2,760 tonnes to 9,609 tonnes. The outbreak of World War I further stimulated demand for aluminium. By 1915, the plant's 405 pots were operating at full capacity. In 1920, the facility contributed to Canada becoming the world's leading aluminium exporter and the nation's largest consumer of electricity.

Several secondary buildings were added to the Shawinigan aluminium plant during the 1910s, including a packaging and storage facility (AL-20). By the end of World War I, the plant employed over 700 workers. In 1920, the anode dimensions in the electrolytic cells were increased (from 3 to 4 inches in width and from 14 to 16 inches in length) reducing the number of anodes per cell from 64 to 52. Production at the plant was significantly reduced in 1921 due to the economic downturn following the post-war aluminium overproduction crisis. During this period, only 70 cells remained in operation, and the workforce was reduced to 187 employees. Operations resumed shortly thereafter, and additional buildings were constructed in 1924. In 1925, the Northern Aluminium Company was renamed Aluminium Company of Canada Limited, commonly known as Alcan. The plant achieved a record annual output of 15,863 tonnes in 1927.

=== Development and decline of production ===
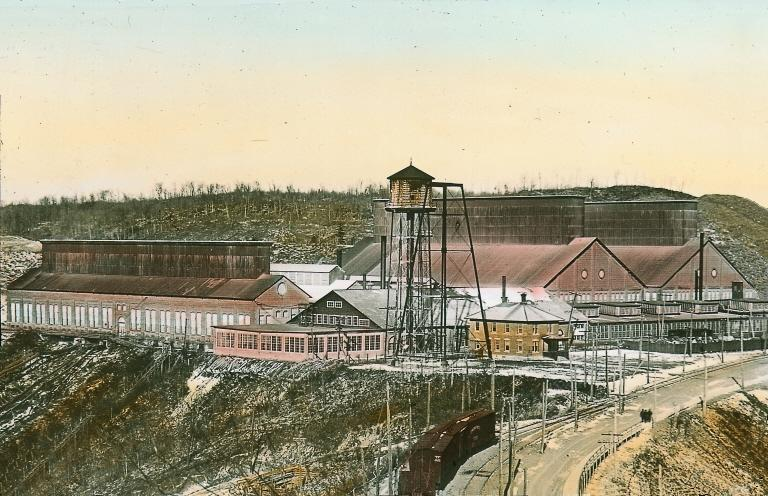
Shawinigan aluminum smelter around 1930.

After unsuccessful negotiations with the Shawinigan Water and Power Company to increase the electricity supply, Alcan redirected its primary metal production to Arvida in the Saguenay–Lac-Saint-Jean region. The company's separation from Alcoa also allowed it to access new markets for cable manufacturing, previously limited by competition with American producers. The Shawinigan plant gradually transitioned from primary aluminium production to the manufacturing of conductor cables. This shift led to the expansion of certain facilities and the modernization of equipment, including the rolling mill and wire drawing machines. During this period, new administrative offices (AL-22) were constructed, likely designed by American architect Frederick de Peyster Townsend (1871–1951).

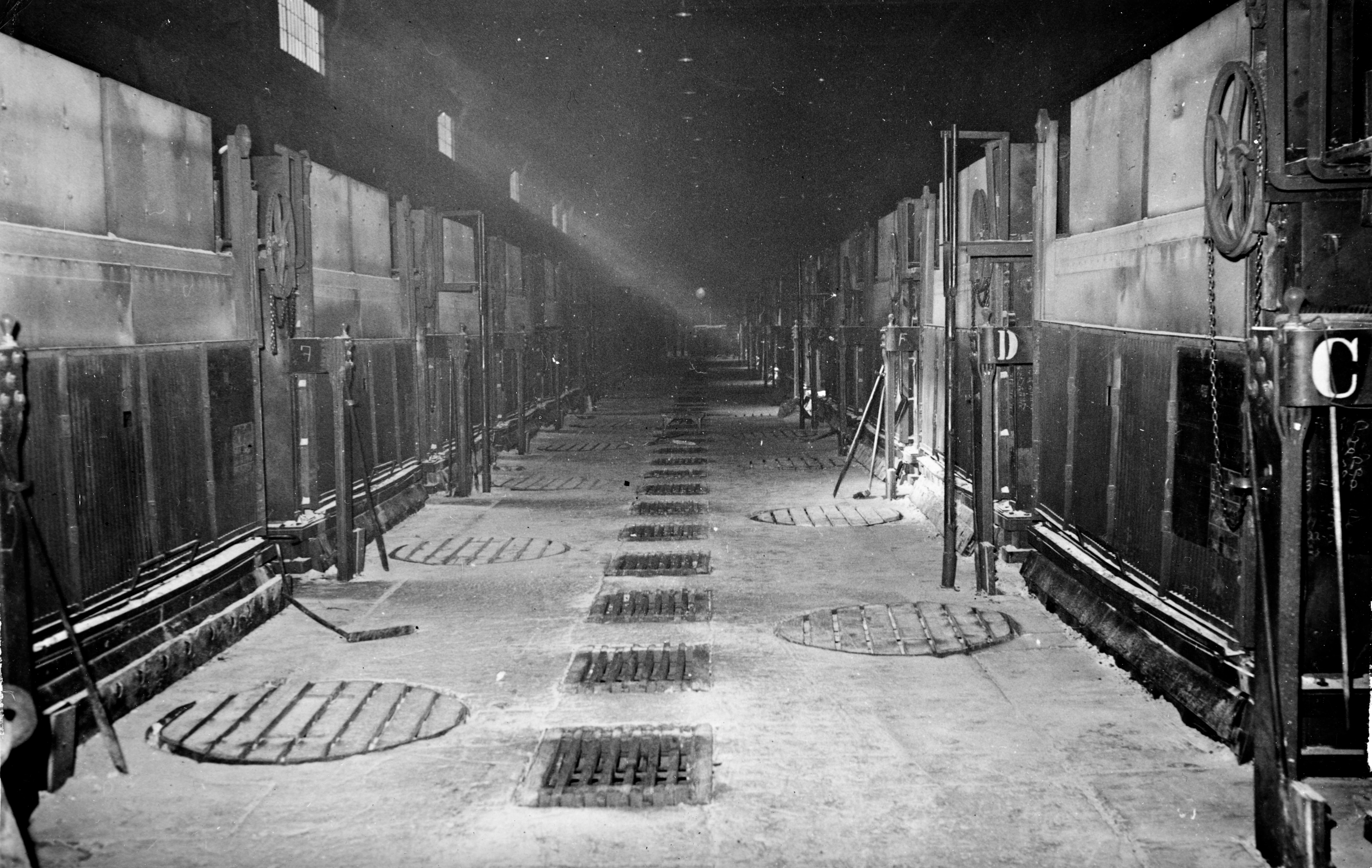
Tank room of the aluminum smelter around 1945.

In 1926, a new type of electrolytic cell was tested at the Shawinigan plant, later adopted at the Arvida aluminium complex. Unlike the Hall cell, the Arvida cell was fully insulated on the bottom and sides and included a cathode plate. This configuration increased the lifespan of the internal lining from approximately 200 to 600 days. The number of anodes was reduced to 14, and they featured a square design rather than the round shape typical of Hall cells. In 1927, all cells on line 1 were replaced with Arvida cells. Improvements in productivity, energy efficiency, and work organization led to further modifications of the remaining Hall cells. These adjustments included the addition of insulation to the cell bottoms, the installation of cathode plates, and the replacement of round anodes with 12 rectangular ones. The modifications reduced electricity consumption by 10% and increased output by 50%. Although the Arvida cells were intended to replace all Hall cells, the modernization program was interrupted by the economic crisis of the 1930s.

Primary aluminum production at the Shawinigan aluminum smelter.

The Great Depression led to a sharp decline in Canada’s aluminium exports, which by 1933 had fallen to one-third of their 1930 level. In response, operations at the Shawinigan plant were suspended. Primary aluminium production resumed in 1936. That same year, Alcan was approached by representatives of the Norwegian company Elektrokemisk, which was promoting Carl Wilhelm Söderberg’s patent for a single rectangular electrode and an adapted electrolytic cell. Two experimental Söderberg cells were installed at the Shawinigan plant, followed by the installation of production Söderberg cells in September 1937, which became operational in January 1938. In 1938, Shawinigan produced 16,800 tonnes of aluminium: 36% from Hall cells, 43% from Arvida cells, and 21% from Söderberg cells. However, the larger size of the Söderberg cells led to spatial congestion, affecting operational efficiency and worker safety. This issue was later resolved through the construction of a new plant in Shawinigan specifically designed to accommodate Söderberg cells. Additional improvements were made during this period. In 1940, Alcan increased the size of anodes in older cells to 13 by 17 inches, enhancing both efficiency and lifespan. Other innovations included the introduction of an air siphon in 1938, which eliminated the need to pierce the cell manually, and the implementation of alumina hoppers around 1937. These hoppers, refilled daily by an employee, allowed operators to dispense a measured amount of alumina into the cell by pulling a chain.

The construction of a new aluminium plant in Shawinigan in 1942 led to the closure of existing electrolytic cells in 1944. The former cell halls were repurposed for storage, and ventilation lanterns were progressively removed. Several doors and windows were sealed.

Following the Second World War, increased demand for conductor cables—driven by rural electrification and the construction of hydroelectric power stations on the Saint-Maurice, Betsiamites, Outardes, and Manicouagan rivers—prompted the Shawinigan facility to diversify its production. This included the manufacture of aluminium strips used in protective sheaths for distribution wires. After the final commissioning of the Manic-Outardes hydroelectric plants in the late 1960s and before the launch of the James Bay Project, the facility experienced a period of stagnation beginning in the early 1970s. The plant ceased operations in 1986.

=== Change of purpose ===
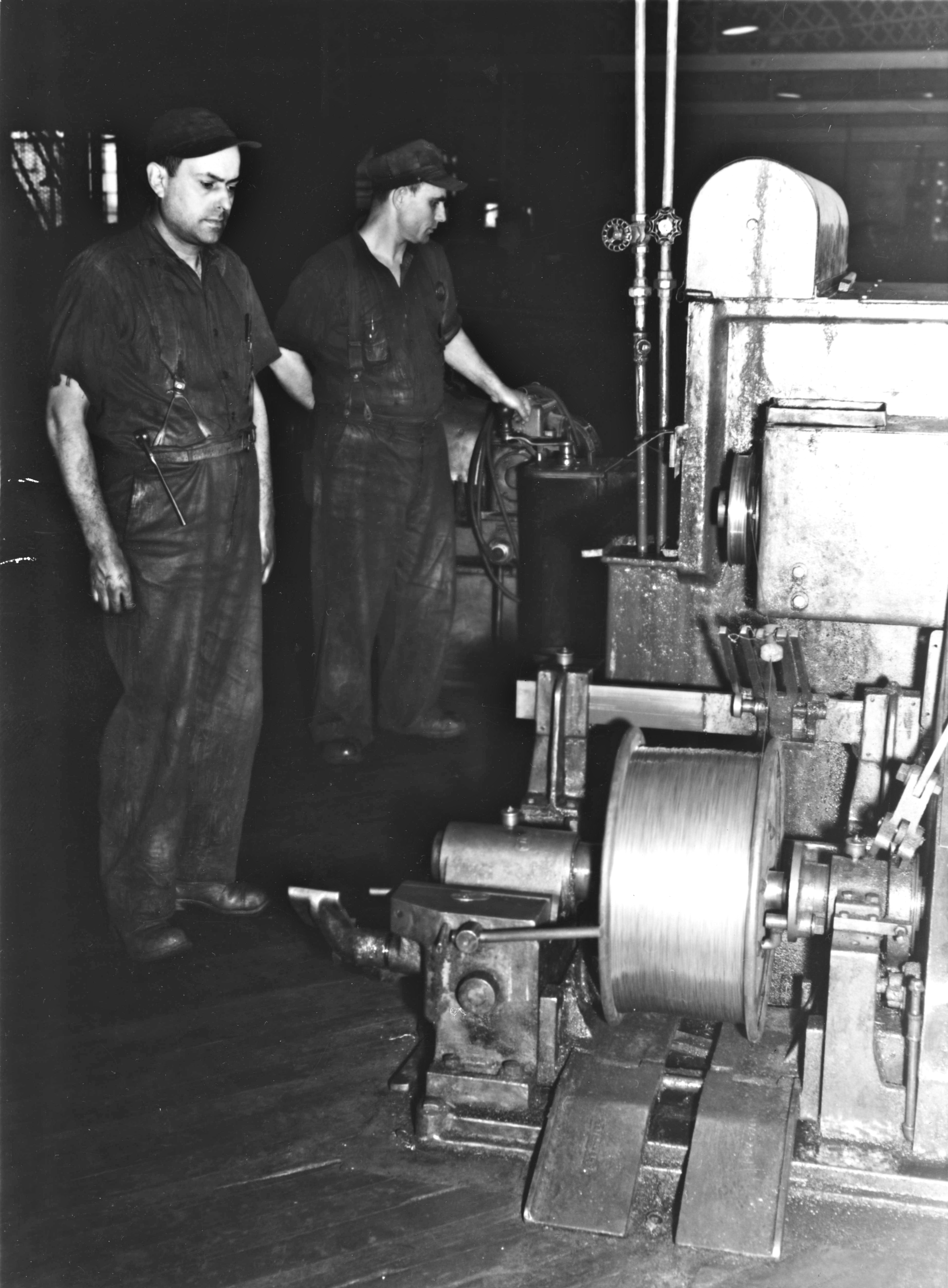
Workers at the wire drawing mill in 1945.

Following the closure of the plant, Alcan initiated the disposal of its industrial complex. In 1989, several buildings, including cell halls AL-15 and AL-17, were sold to the paper company Consolidated Bathurst for the expansion of its Belgo plant. Some structures, such as cell hall AL-17, were subsequently demolished. In 2001, the remaining facilities were acquired by the Cité de l’énergie, a museum complex dedicated to Shawinigan’s industrial heritage. On July 18, 2002, the aluminium plant, cell hall AL-15, the N.A.C. power plant, and the remnants of the Alcan-16 power plant were designated a National Historic Site of Canada by the Historic Sites and Monuments Board of Canada.

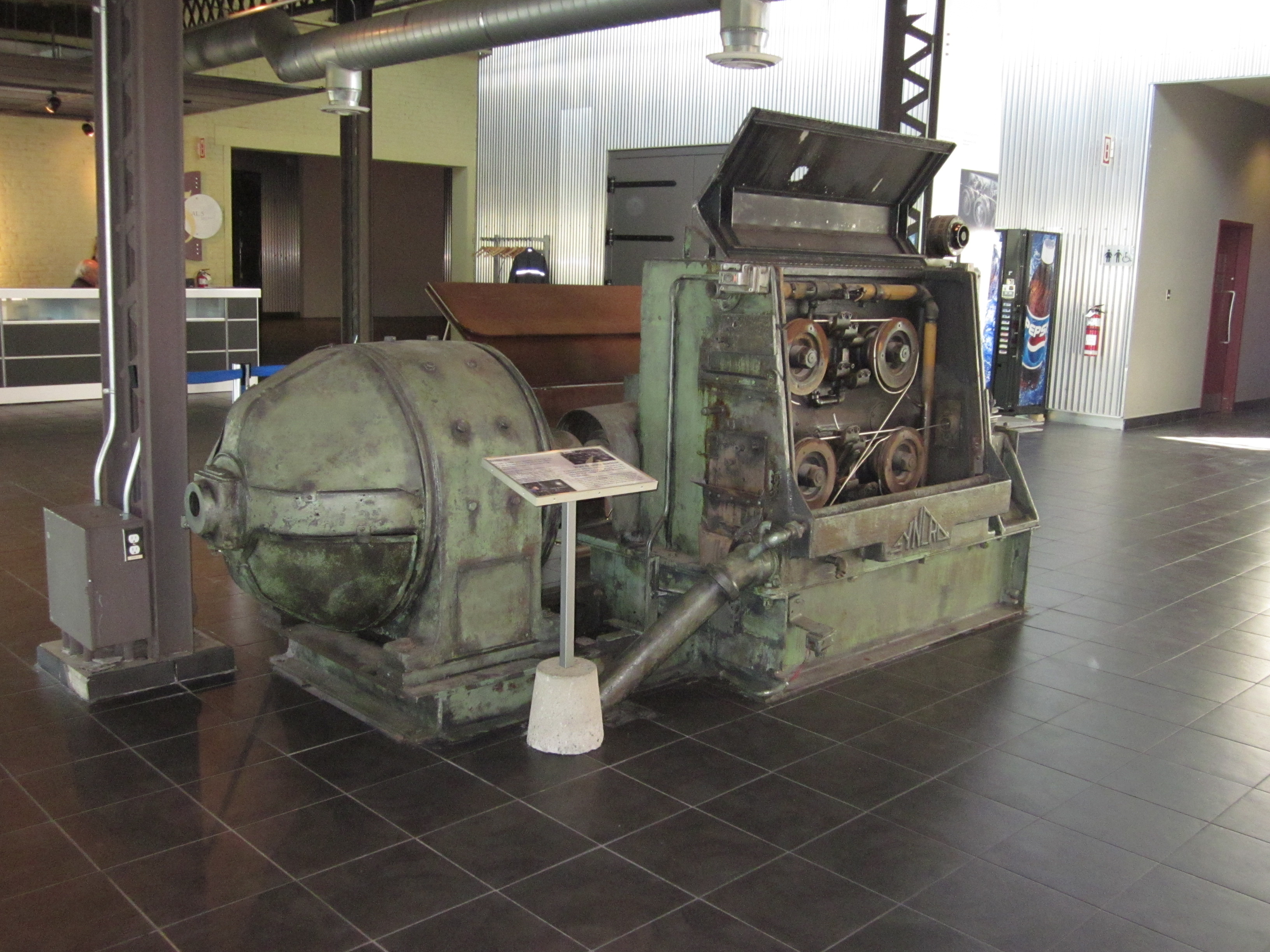
Spinner in the AL-3 building in 2011.

The buildings acquired by the Cité de l’énergie were restored between 2001 and 2003 by a consortium of architects, including Michel Pellerin, Sylvie Rainville, Renée Tremblay, and the firm Desnoyers, Mercure et associés. The site opened to the public in 2003 under the name Espace Shawinigan and has since hosted museum exhibitions as well as events such as fairs, conferences, and expositions. In 2010, the regional tourism association of Mauricie (Tourisme Mauricie) relocated its offices to the administrative buildings.

Following Abitibi-Consolidated’s filing under the Companies’ Creditors Arrangement Act, the regional history organization Appartenance Mauricie Société d’histoire régionale submitted a request in 2009 to have building AL-15 designated as a heritage site. Supported by the Cité de l’énergie, the organization expressed concerns that the building might be demolished or repurposed in ways incompatible with its historical character. The request was later expanded to include the entire aluminium plant. On May 23, 2013, the site was designated a heritage property by the Ministry of Culture and Communications of Quebec. The designation covers the exterior facades of buildings AL-2, AL-3, AL-5, AL-6, AL-7, AL-8, AL-9, AL-11, AL-14, AL-15, AL-20, and AL-22; the overhead cranes in cell halls AL-5, AL-7, and AL-15; and the grounds of the plant, excluding those surrounding building AL-15. In 2012, building AL-15 was acquired by the Cité de l’énergie.

== Architecture ==
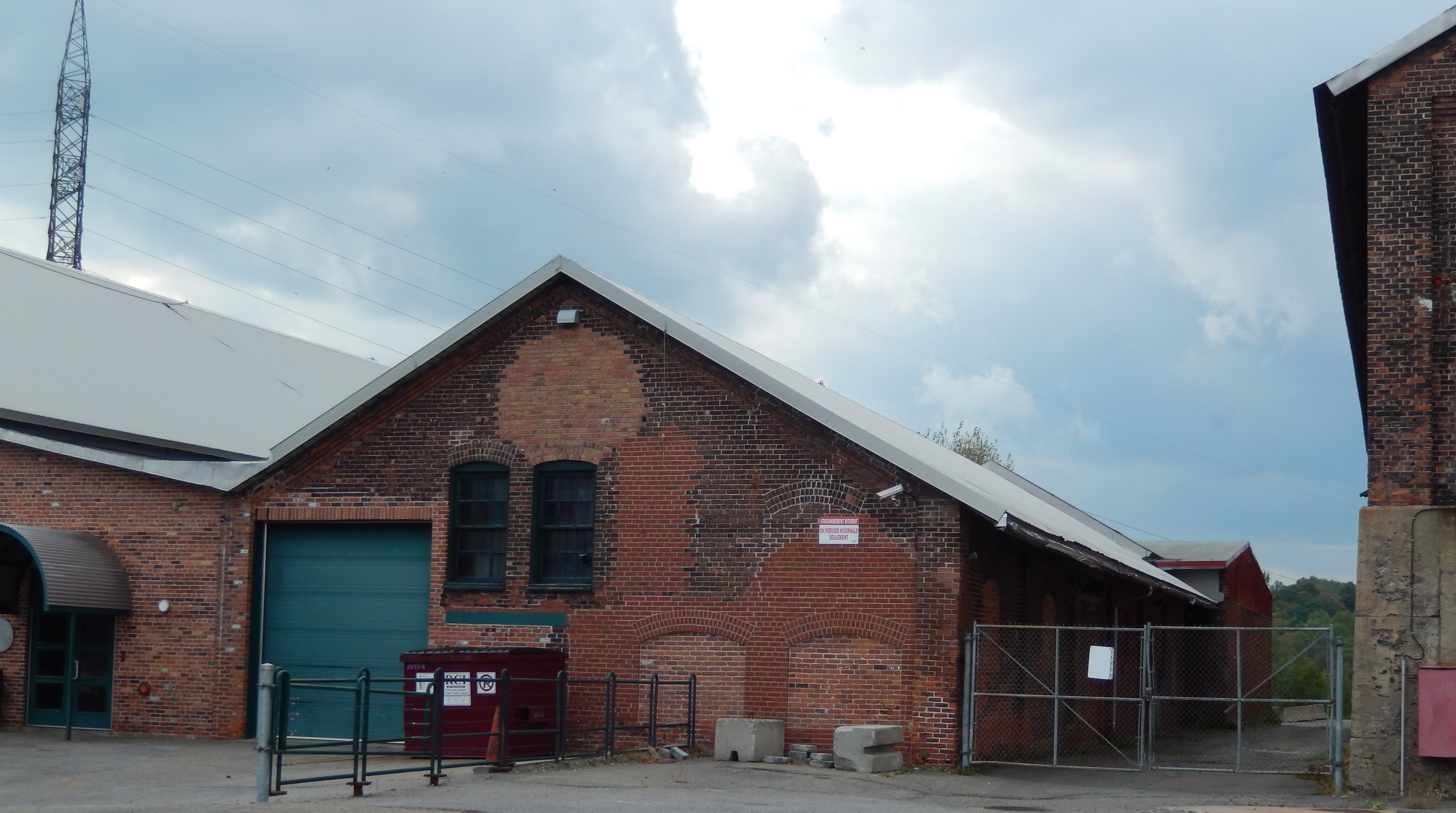
Building AL-11.

The former Shawinigan aluminium plant comprises 12 buildings constructed between 1900 and 1927: AL-2, AL-3, AL-5, AL-6, AL-7, AL-8, AL-9, AL-11, AL-14, AL-15, AL-20, and AL-22. These structures served various industrial and administrative functions, including cell halls, a foundry, wire drawing and cabling workshops, laboratories, a coke grinding workshop, storage areas, and offices. The buildings are largely interconnected, reflecting the integrated layout typical of early 20th-century industrial complexes.

The administrative buildings (AL-2 and AL-22) are situated at the front of the site, near Cascade Street and the Saint-Maurice River, while the other structures are located further back, allowing for space dedicated to access and parking.

=== Industrial buildings ===
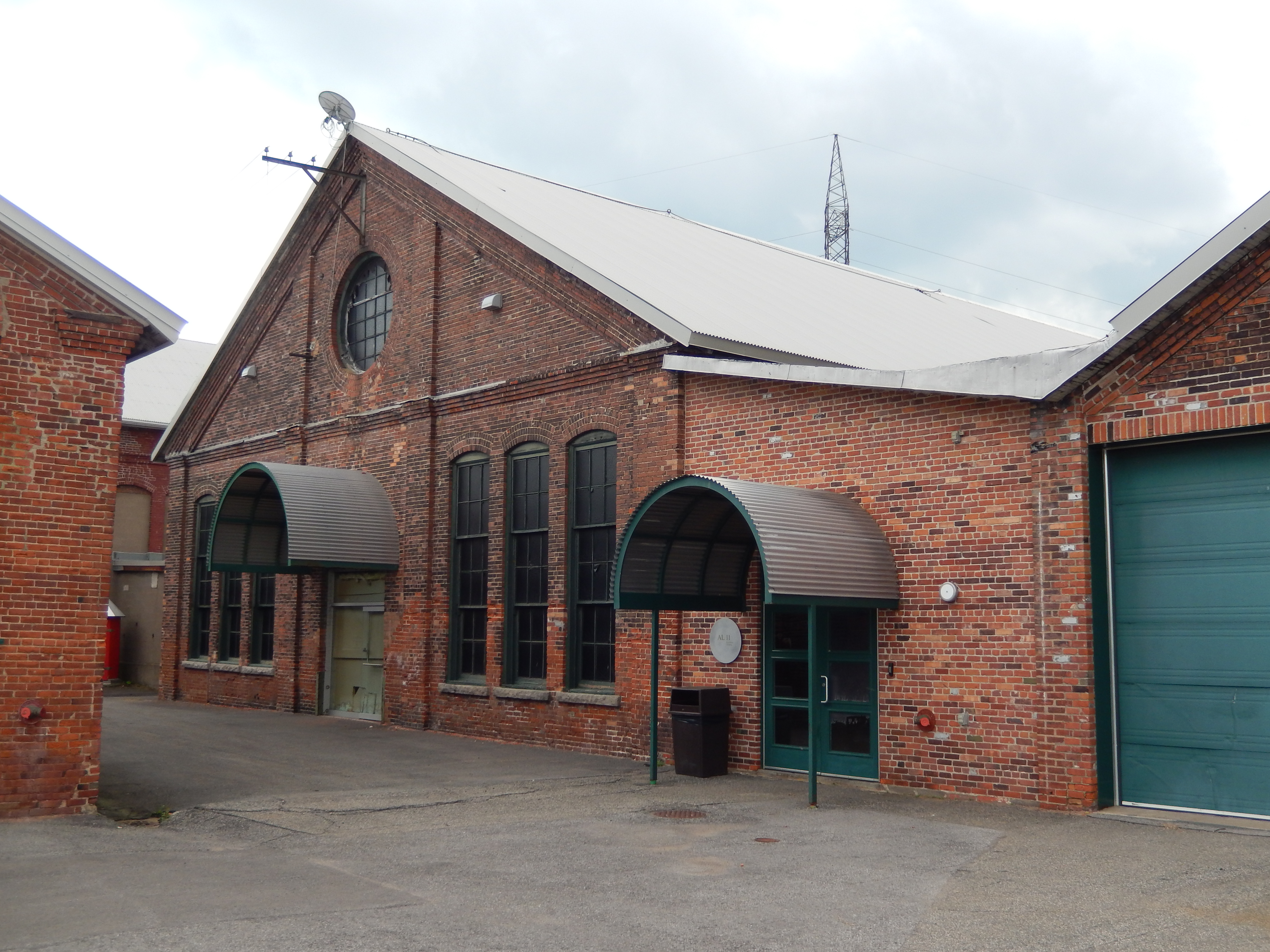
Façade of the AL-9 building.

The industrial buildings reflect the typical architecture of early 20th-century industrial complexes, characterized by utilitarian design aimed at minimizing production costs. Some structures incorporate classical architectural elements, including gabled façades and doors with arched, glazed tympanums. Despite the site's loss of its original function, the architecture remains well preserved. The industrial buildings are set back from the administrative ones, and the open spaces in front were formerly occupied by railway tracks and additional structures that have since been demolished.

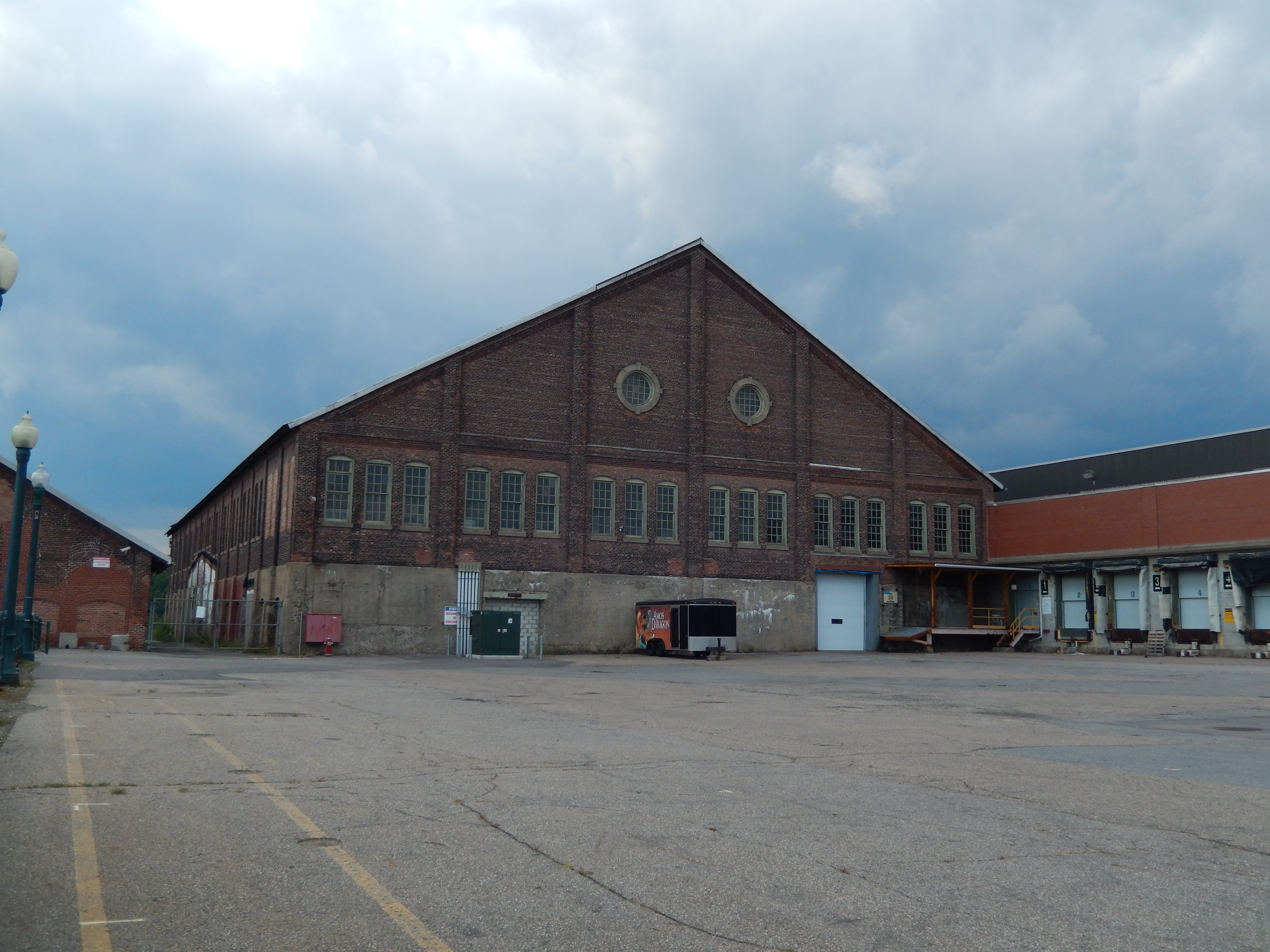
Building AL-15 with its raised foundation.

The buildings have simple, rectangular volumes and range from one to two stories in height. Their steel structures allow for large, open interior spaces suitable for housing industrial machinery. Several buildings, including AL-5, AL-7, and AL-15, have retained their overhead cranes, originally used for handling heavy loads. In some cases, such as building AL-9, the façade is placed on the gable end, imparting a classical appearance.

Most structures rest on concrete slab foundations, except for building AL-15, which is elevated on a raised concrete base. The buildings are uniformly clad in brick laid in an American bond, characterized by several courses of stretchers alternating with a single course of headers. This technique contributes to the visual cohesion of the complex. In early 20th-century industrial architecture, brick was commonly used for its affordability and fire resistance, offering a practical alternative to wood.

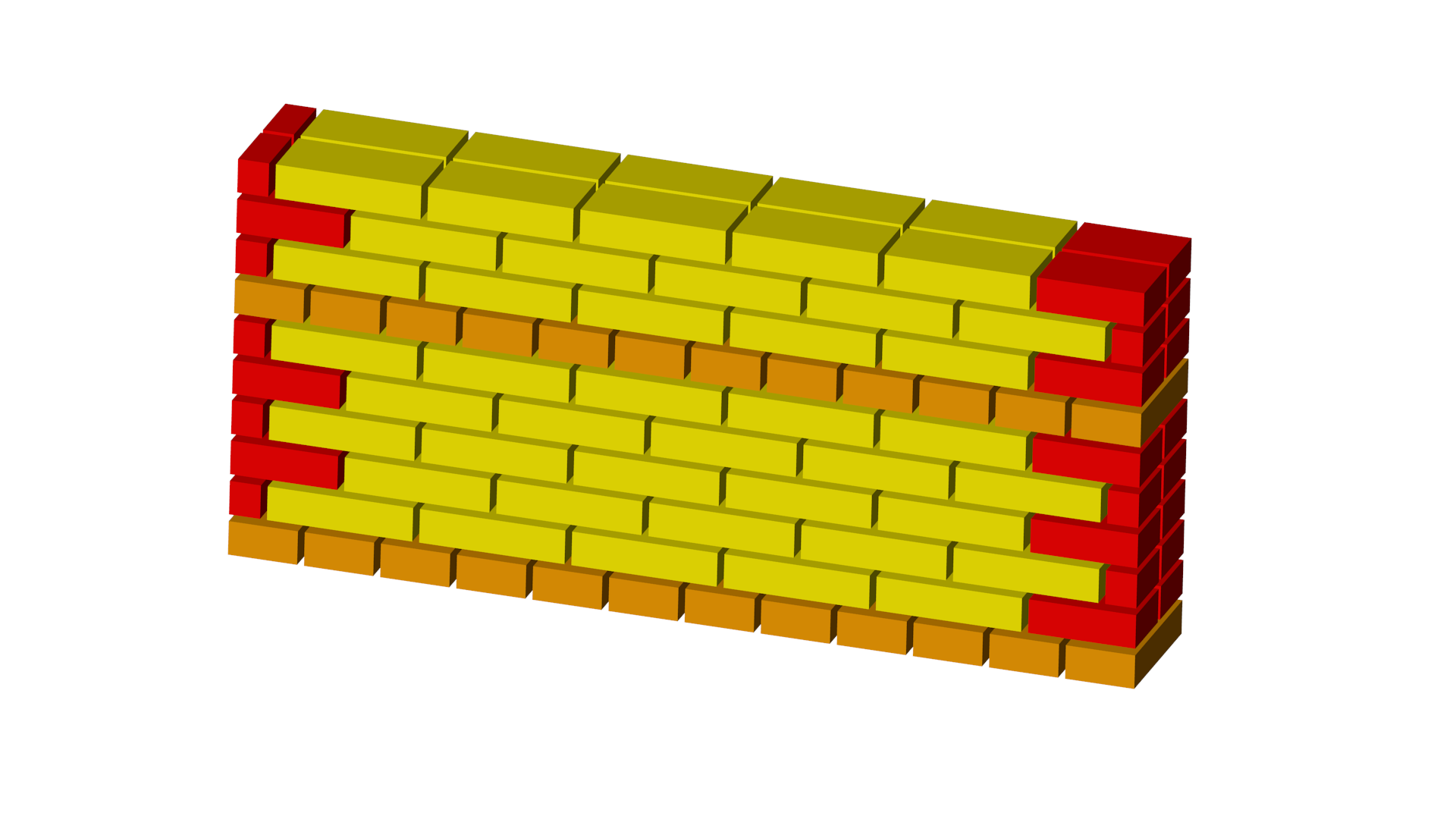
Diagram showing an American device.

The roofs of the buildings are of simple design. Most structures feature gabled roofs, as seen on buildings AL-5, AL-7, AL-11, and AL-15. Others have flat roofs, such as the extension of building AL-3, while some, including AL-8 and AL-20, are equipped with shed roofs. All roofs are covered with sheet metal, chosen for its cost-effectiveness and fire-resistant properties.

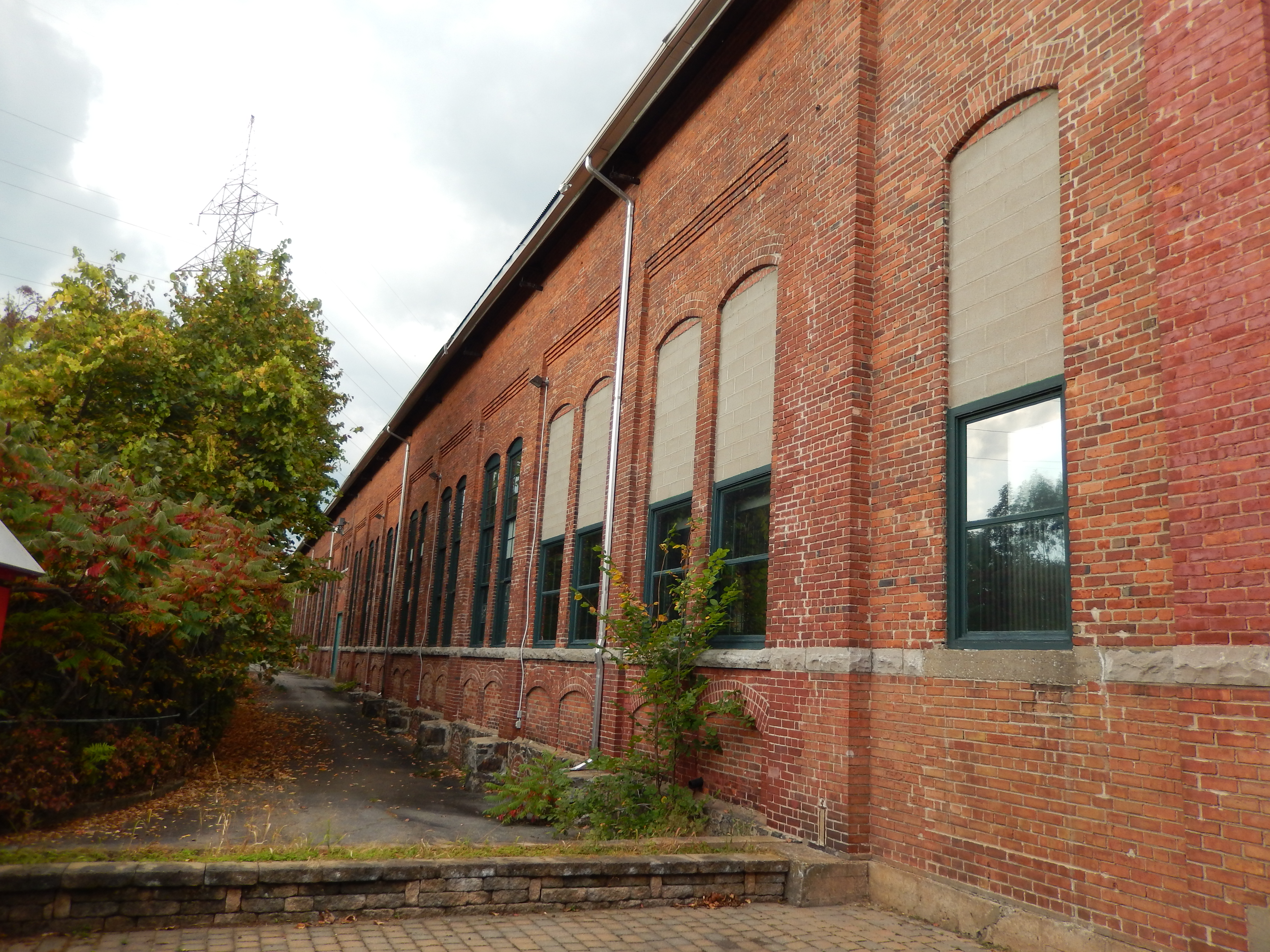
Fenestration of the AL-5 building.

The buildings used in the aluminum production process are equipped with large windows designed to maximize natural light. These windows are generally rectangular or segmental-arched and divided into multiple panes, characteristic of early 20th-century industrial architecture. Some gable walls feature oculi, contributing to a classical aesthetic. Most doors are oversized to accommodate the movement of materials and equipment, and some are topped with a glazed tympanum, reflecting classical architectural influences.

As industrial structures, the buildings feature minimal ornamentation. Decorative elements include pilasters formed by brickwork projections, corbelled cornices, and openings framed with sills, flat arches, or segmental arches. Some oculi are outlined with carved stone surrounds. This understated ornamentation is characteristic of classical architectural influence.

=== Administrative buildings ===
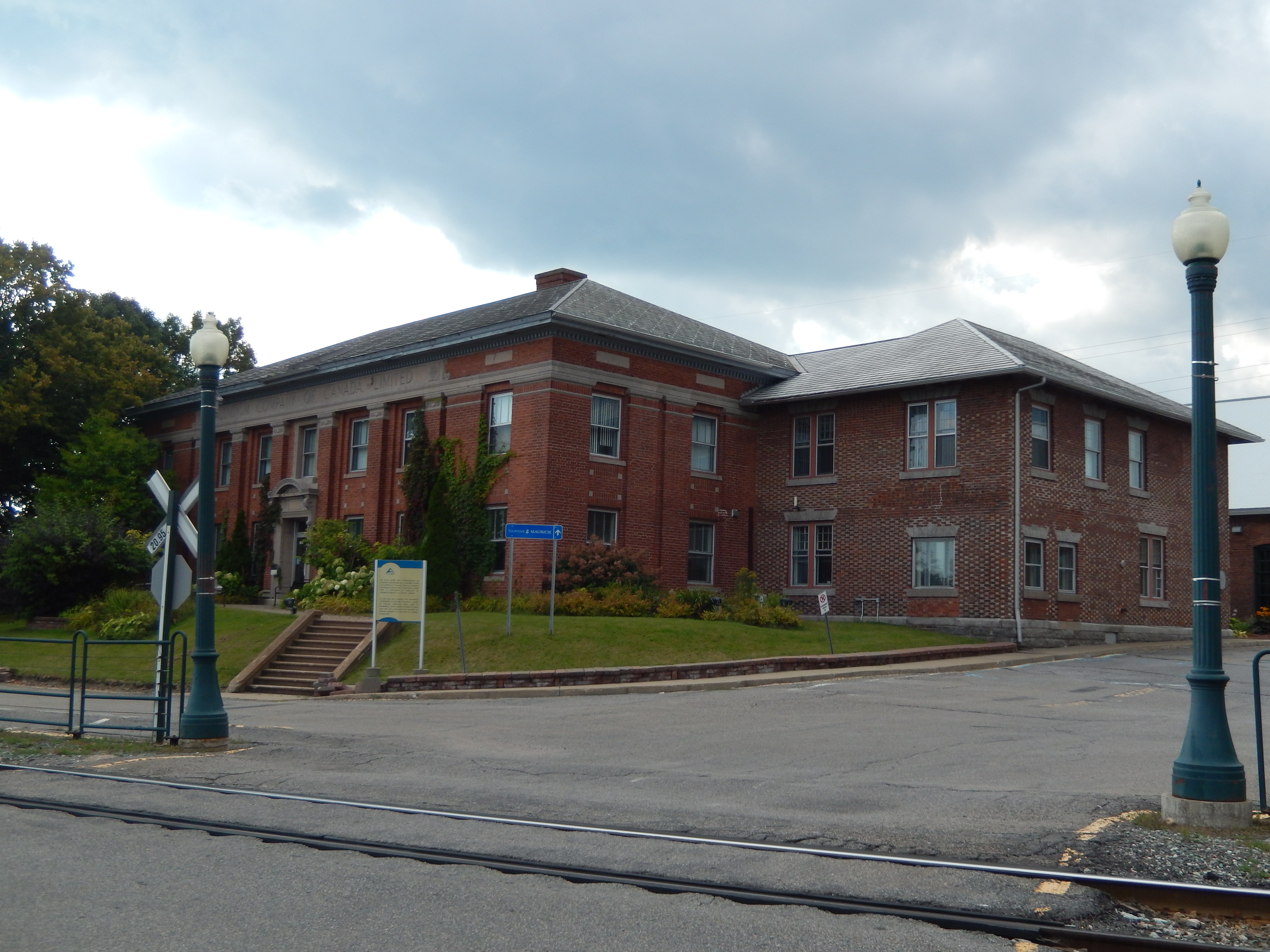
Buildings AL-22 (in front) and AL-2 (set back).

The administrative buildings (AL-2 and AL-22) are distinguished by more elaborate decorative features and their placement near the public road. These characteristics reflect their representative function and the company's intent to project a strong corporate image.

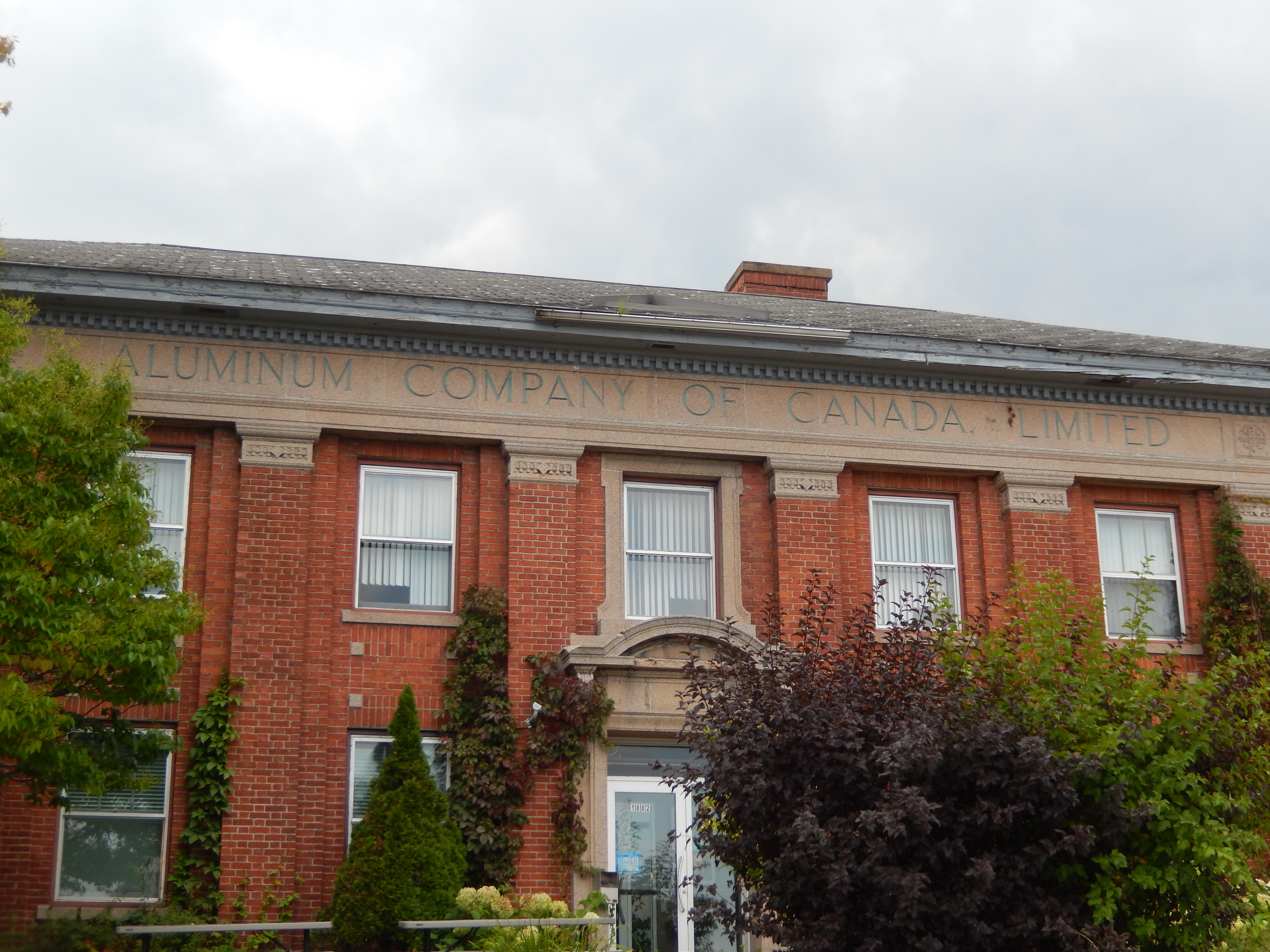
Frieze with the inscription “ALUMINIUM COMPANY OF CANADA, LIMITED.”

Both buildings have a rectangular floor plan and are constructed on a slightly elevated concrete foundation, finished with cut stone for AL-22 and rusticated stone for AL-2. While they share the brick facing typical of industrial buildings, a Flemish bond—alternating stretcher and header bricks—distinguishes them. AL-22 uses only red brick for both its facade and chimney, while AL-2 employs contrasting header bricks to create a checkerboard pattern. Each building features a hipped roof, a design not found elsewhere in the complex, and both roofs are clad in aluminum tile, reflecting the site's historical production activities.

The openings are rectangular, vertically oriented, and fitted with wooden sash windows. A later addition of external secondary glazing alters the appearance of the original openings. The upper sections of the windows retain original tiling. The main entrance of building AL-22 has been replaced with a modern door that does not align with the original dimensions.

The ornamentation of the administrative buildings is more elaborate than that of the industrial structures, while still adhering to classical architectural principles. Stone elements are featured prominently. The main entrance includes a portal with a curved pediment, flanked by pilasters with bases and capitals. Above is a frieze bearing the inscription “ALUMINIUM COMPANY OF CANADA, LIMITED.” Additional classical features include a dentil cornice, decorative panels, and brick and stone sills and lintels.

== See also ==
- La Cité de l'Énergie
- List of National Historic Sites of Canada in Quebec

== Bibliography ==
- Lizotte, Sylvain (2017). Plan de conservation de l'ancienne aluminerie de Shawinigan [Conservation plan for the former Shawinigan aluminum smelter] (in French). French Ministry of Culture and Communications. ISBN 978-2-550-78245-2.
- Côté, Luc (1988). Production et reproduction : l'évolution du procès de travail aux usines d'aluminium de la compagnie Alcan à Shawinigan et à Arvida, 1901-1951 [Production and reproduction: the evolution of the work process at Alcan aluminum plants in Shawinigan and Arvida, 1901-1951] (in French). Ottawa: Université d'Ottawa. ISBN 0-315-53789-2.
