= Lise Landry =

Canadian politician

Lise Landry is a local politician in Shawinigan, Quebec, Canada. She was the 19th Mayor of the city from 1994 to 2009.

== Family and life prior to elective office ==
She is married. Her husband's name is Henri. Her son Yves has been the Member for the District des Terrasses on the Trois-Rivières City Council.

Prior to her election, she was political assistant to Liberal MNA Yvon Lemire.

== Mayor of Shawinigan ==
Landry successfully ran as Mayor of Shawinigan in 1994 and became the first woman to serve in that function.

She was re-elected in 1998 (without opposition), in 2001 (against Grand-Mère Mayor Linda Lafrenière) and in 2005.

=== Legacy ===
During her administration, La Cité de l'Énergie, a theme park based on local industrial history with a 115-metre-high (377 ft) observation tower, was established.

A number of sections of town were revitalized, including Willow Avenue and Lévis Avenue, where traffic was re-arranged into a circle and an ornamental fountain was erected. The area near the intersection of Royal Boulevard and Trudel Street was re-developed into a business district that includes large department stores such as Wal-Mart.

Several public parks changed names to honor local historical figures and celebrations were held to commemorate the city's centennial.

Her leadership is often credited with easing out the controversial provincial government-ordered merger of Shawinigan with much of the MRC Le Centre-de-la-Mauricie.

=== Growing opposition and retirement ===
A number of initiatives proposed by Lise Landry were met with more criticism. The most notable example is the construction and completion of the Centre Bionest de Shawinigan. The final price tag of the facility will be higher than expected.

This proposal as well as Landry's own management style made it more challenging in recent years to govern by consensus with the members of the city council and with other civic leaders. Opposition to her re-election emerged and she announced that she would not run for another term of office in 2009.

== Life after retirement ==
Landry hinted that she will support city councilor and Liberal candidate France Beaulieu in the district of Saint-Maurice—Champlain in the next federal election. She also endorsed successful candidate Michel Angers for mayor in 2009.

== Footnotes ==
Political offices
Preceded by Roland Désaulniers	Mayors of Shawinigan; 1994–2009	Succeeded by Michel Angers
