= Napoléon Désaulniers =

J.-H.-Napoléon Désaulniers (1875-1958) was a local politician in Shawinigan, Quebec. He served two non-consecutive terms as the sixth Mayor of Shawinigan.

He was born in 1875 in Nicolet, Centre-du-Québec. He was a Conservative machine politician and was a notary.

Désaulniers served as a council member in Shawinigan from 1911 to 1913.

He also was the mayor of the city from 1918 to 1920 and 1928 to 1930.

He was in office when World War I came to an end.

He died in Shawinigan in 1958.

Avenue Désaulniers near Collège de Shawinigan was named to honour him.

== See also ==
- Mayors of Shawinigan
- Mauricie
- Shawinigan, Quebec

Political offices
Preceded by Joseph-Auguste Frigon	Mayors of Shawinigan; 1918–1920	Succeeded by Joseph-Alexis Dufresne
Preceded by Joseph-Alexis Dufresne	Mayors of Shawinigan; 1928–1930	Succeeded by Albert Gigaire
