= Roland Désaulniers =

Roland Désaulniers has been a local businessman and politician in Shawinigan, Quebec. He was the 18th Mayor of Shawinigan, Quebec from 1986 to 1994.

He successfully ran as Mayor of Shawinigan in 1986 and was re-elected in 1990.

He did not run for re-election in 1994.

Désaulniers, who is a federalist, took the stump in local rallies in 1995 to oppose the Quebec sovereignty movement. He has often been mentioned by the media as a potential Liberal candidate to the provincial legislature but has never thrown his hat in the ring so far.

He has also been chairman of the board of administrators for La Cité de l'Énergie, a theme park based on local industrial history with a 115-metre-high (377 ft) observation tower.

== See also ==
- Canadian federalism
- Mayors of Shawinigan
- Mauricie
- Shawinigan, Quebec

Political offices
Preceded by Dominique Grenier	Mayors of Shawinigan; 1986–1994	Succeeded by Lise Landry
