= Saulnier =

Saulnier (French pronunciation: [so.nje]) is a surname. Notable people with the surname include:

- Cyril Saulnier, French tennis player
- Jeremy Saulnier, American film director
- Jill Saulnier, Canadian ice hockey player
- Jules Saulnier, French architect
- Lucien Saulnier, Canadian politician
- Raymond Saulnier (aircraft manufacturer), joint founder of the Morane-Saulnier aircraft company
- Raymond J. Saulnier, American economist
- Steve Saulnier, American football player and coach
- Tania Saulnier, Canadian actress

== Other ==
- Morane-Saulnier, French aircraft manufacturer
- List of aircraft (S), Saulnier
- Saulnières (disambiguation)
