= Monument des Braves =

Cenotaph in Shawinigan, Quebec, Canada

Monument des Braves, Shawinigan
- Canada
- For local soldiers who died in service
- Unveiled: 1948
- Location: 46.53955°N 72.75357°W intersection of Fourth Street and Promenade du Saint-Maurice near Shawinigan, Quebec, Canada
- Designed by: J. Cuvelier
- names of local soldiers who died in World War I, World War II,

The Monument des Braves is a cenotaph located in Shawinigan, Quebec. It was completed in 1948, when François Roy was mayor. The monument is located in downtown Shawinigan at the intersection of Fourth Street and Promenade du Saint-Maurice (then Riverside Street) near the Saint-Maurice River.

It was designed by Trois-Rivières architect J. Cuvelier and consists of a 35-foot (10.7 m) tall granite obelisk topped with a soldier helmet and a victory wreath. A sword underneath three laurel wreaths appear on both the north and the south sides of the memorial. The names of local soldiers who died in World War I are shown on the south side. Those who died during World War II are remembered on the north side of the structure.

Every year on Remembrance Day weekend, members of the 62nd (Shawinigan) Field Artillery Regiment gather nearby the Monument des Braves cenotaph and conduct a ceremony to commemorate soldiers who died on a field of honor.
