= List of mayors of Shawinigan =

The Mayor is the highest elected official in Shawinigan, Quebec, Canada. Since its incorporation in 1901, the city has had twenty mayors.

#	Mayor	Taking Office	Leaving
1	Vivian Burrill	1901	1902
2	Arthur Dufresne	1902	1902
3	Beaudry Leman	1902	1908
1	Vivian Burrill	1908	1913
4	Joseph-Auguste Frigon	1913	1915
5	Edmond Thibaudeau	1915	1917
4	Joseph-Auguste Frigon	1917	1918
6	Napoléon Désaulniers	1918	1920
7	Joseph-Alexis Dufresne	1920	1928
6	Napoléon Désaulniers	1928	1930
8	Albert Gigaire	1930	1936
9	Lucien Bourassa	1936	1937
10	Alexandre Gélinas	1937	1938
11	J.A. Bilodeau	1938	1946
12	François Roy	1946	1954
13	Gaston Hardy	1954	1957
14	Armand Foucher	1957	1963
15	Gérard Dufresne	1963	1966
16	Maurice Bruneau	1966	1970
17	Dominique Grenier	1970	1986
18	Roland Désaulniers	1986	1994
19	Lise Landry	1994	2009
20	Michel Angers	2009	2025
21	Yves Lévesque	2025	present

Officially, elections to the Shawinigan Council are on a non-partisan basis. In recent history however, mayors of Shawinigan have been generally Liberal leaning. Gérard Dufresne, Dominique Grenier, Roland Désaulniers and Lise Landry were or have been card-carrying supporters of the Quebec Liberal Party and the Liberal Party of Canada.
