= Baie-de-Shawinigan =

Coordinates: 46°32′N 72°46′W

Baie-de-Shawinigan (Canada 1996 Census population 265) is a small industrial community within the City of Shawinigan in the Canadian province of Quebec. The place is named after its location on a bay of the Saint-Maurice River. For a period of time, it was also known as Belgoville because it faced the paper mill of the Belgo Canadian Pulp Company.

The place was incorporated in 1907 as the Village Municipality of Baie-de-Shawinigan, but merged into the City of Shawinigan in 1998.

It is the childhood home of former Prime Minister Jean Chrétien and since 1911 is home to Sacré-Cœur Catholic Church (Sacred Heart), which is located at 17, rue de l'Église.

== Mayors ==
From 1907 to 1998, Baie-de-Shawinigan had its own mayor and its own city council. The mayors were:

#	Mayor	Taking Office	Leaving
1	Joseph-Arthur Houle	1907	1911
2	Edmond Ménard	1911	1911
3	William Dubé	1911	1913
4	Émile Julien	1913	1916
5	Joseph-Eulage Ménard	1916	1917
4	Émile Julien	1917	1919
6	Joseph Lajoie	1919	1925
7	Émile Matteau	1925	1927
8	Alphonse Côté	1927	1929
6	Joseph Lajoie	1929	1931
7	Émile Matteau	1931	1932
9	Arthur Bellemare	1932	1933
10	Eddy Boisvert	1933	1941
11	Dominique Mercier	1941	1957
12	Conrad Lemay	1957	1975
13	Victorien Dubé	1975	1998
