= La Cité de l'Énergie =

Television Tower

Coordinates: 46.534982°N 72.754898°W

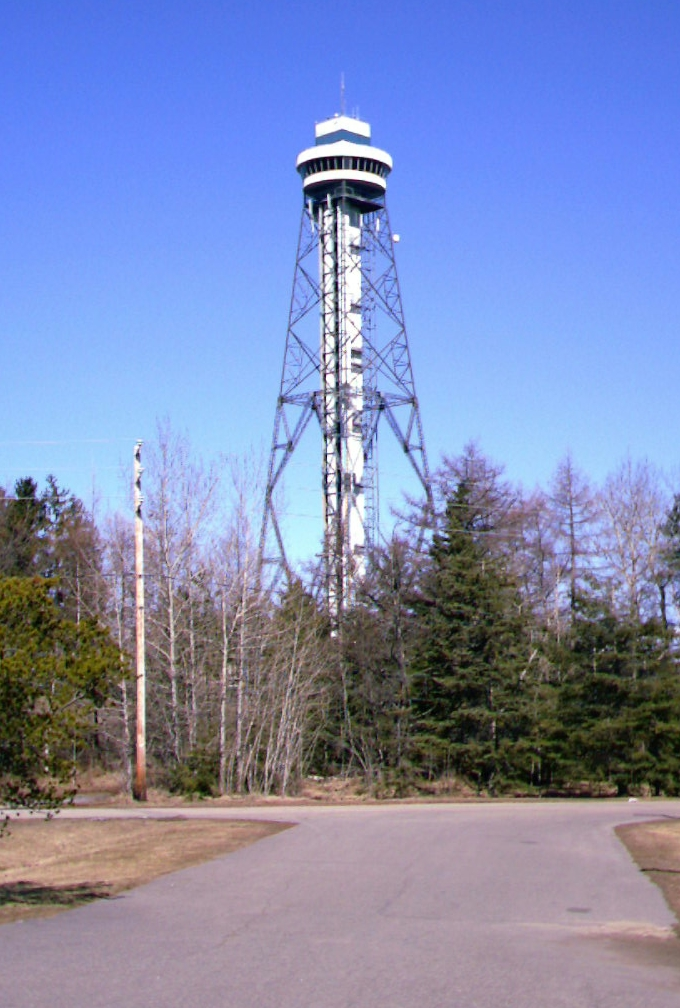
- Observation tower at La Cité de l'Énergie
- Established: June 21, 1997
- Location: Shawinigan, Quebec, Canada
- Type: theme park
- Website: http://www.citedelenergie.com/

La Cite de l'Énergie (French for the city of energy) is a theme park based on local industrial history and located in Shawinigan, Quebec, Canada.

== Facilities ==
- A science centre, which includes a 115 m (377 ft) high observation tower and features a multimedia show as well as a permanent interactive exhibit. The lattice tower consists of a dismantled electricity pylon used for a temporary power line crossing of Saint Lawrence River between Grondines and Lotbinière, during the construction of the tunnel used to ultimately carry the Quebec - New England Transmission line.

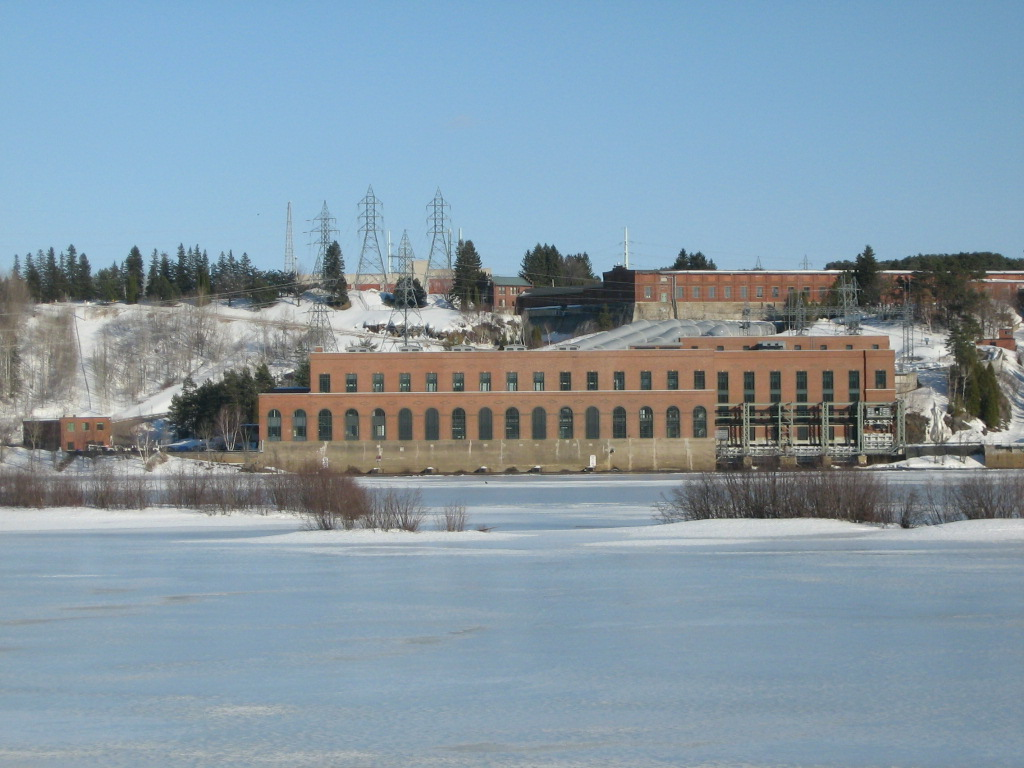
Shawinigan-2 hydroelectric station

- A Historical sector, which consists of two power plants, Northern Aluminum Company (NAC) and Shawinigan 2, and the ruins of a third one (Alcan 16), as well as an electricity distribution station and an aluminium smelter.

The NAC plant (built circa 1906) was privately owned by Alcan and used for its fabrication of aluminium. It had become obsolete by the early 1950s and is now out of production. It is open to visitors.

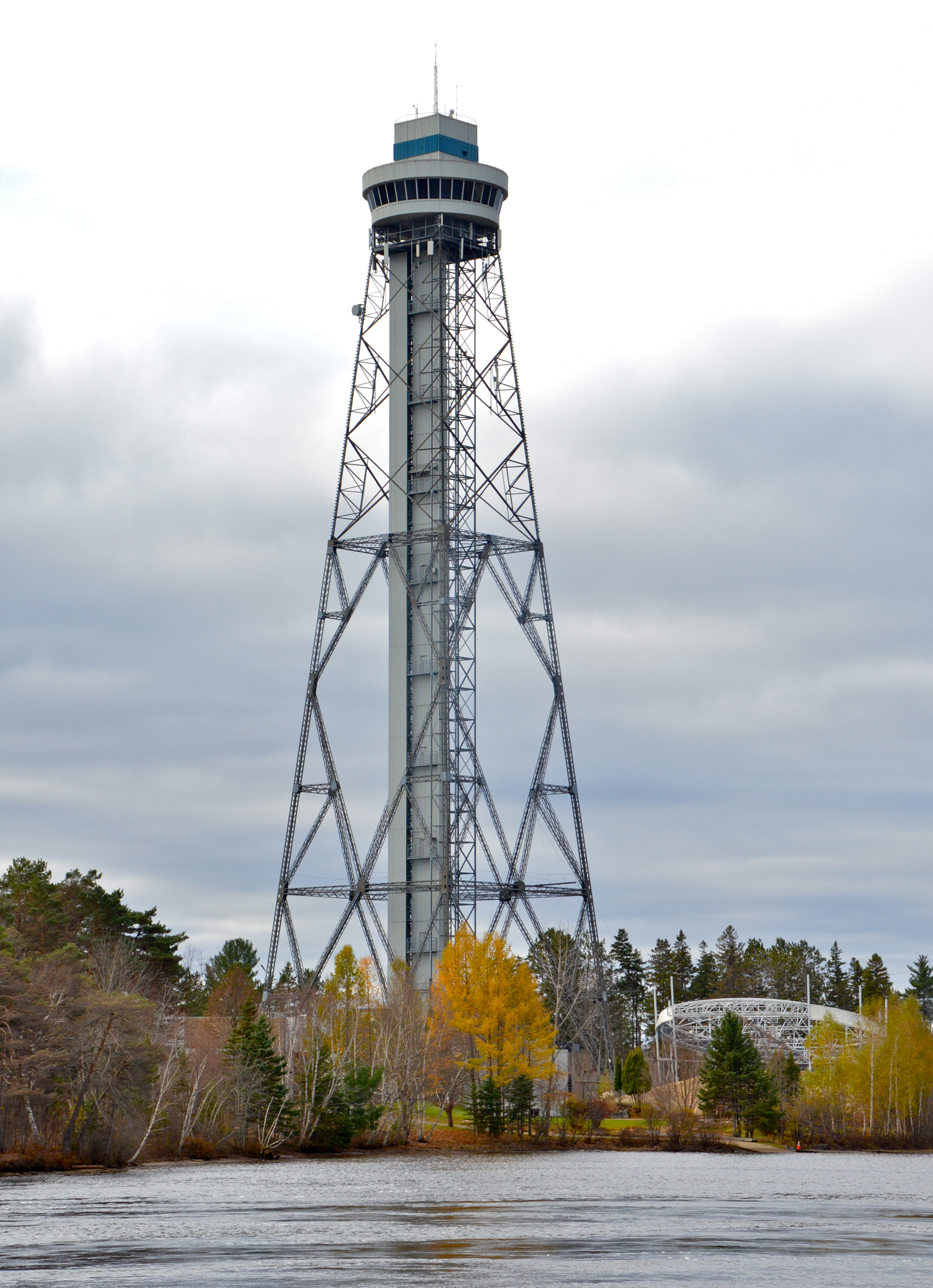
A picture of the tower next to the river.

Shawinigan 2 was established in 1911 and enlarged in 1928 by the Shawinigan Water & Power Company and has been operated by Hydro-Québec since 1963. The structure was erected in the Renaissance and Art Deco architectural styles. The machinery consists of five generators activated by horizontal turbines and three generators activated by vertical turbines.

== Management ==
La Cité de l'Énergie is administered by a non-profit organization, whose funders are Abitibi-Consolidated, Alcan, Hydro-Québec and the City of Shawinigan.

Robert Trudel has been the general manager and the main spokesperson for La Cité de l'Énergie, since its foundation.

== Impact on local tourism ==
Since it opened in 1997, La Cité de l'Énergie attracted hundreds of thousands of paying visitors. The park is generally open to the public each year from June to September; and to groups during other times of the year.

== See also ==
- History of Hydro-Québec
- List of hydroelectric stations in Quebec
- Lattice tower
- Lise Landry
- Roland Désaulniers
- Former Shawinigan Aluminium Plant
