= Saulnières =

Saulnières refers to two communes in France:

- Saulnières, Eure-et-Loir
- Saulnières, Ille-et-Vilaine
