= 15th Quebec Legislature =

The 15th Legislative Assembly of Quebec is the provincial legislature in Quebec, Canada that existed from June 23, 1919, to February 5, 1923. The Quebec Liberal Party led by Lomer Gouin and Louis-Alexandre Taschereau was the governing party. Taschereau succeeded Gouin in 1920 as Premier of Quebec.

== Seats per political party ==
- After the 1919 elections

Affiliation	Members
Liberal	74
Conservative	5
Parti ouvrier	2
Total	81
Government Majority	69

== Member list ==
This was the list of members of the Legislative Assembly of Quebec that were elected in the 1919 election:

Name	Party	Riding	First elected / previously elected	No. of terms
John Hay	Liberal	Argenteuil	1910, 1916	3rd term*
Joseph-Édouard Perrault	Liberal	Arthabaska	1916	2nd term
Joseph-Émery Phaneuf	Liberal	Bagot	1913	3rd term
Arthur Godbout	Liberal	Beauce	1902	6th term
Joseph-Hughes Fortier (1921)	Liberal	Beauce	1921	1st term
Achille Bergevin	Liberal	Beauharnois	1900, 1919	3rd term*
Antonin Galipeault	Liberal	Bellechasse	1909	4th term
Siméon Lafrenière	Liberal	Berthier	1919	1st term
Joseph-Fabien Bugeaud	Liberal	Bonaventure	1914	3rd term
William Robert Oliver	Liberal	Brome	1917	2nd term
Eugène Merril Lesieur Desaulniers	Liberal	Chambly	1909	4th term
Bruno Bordeleau	Liberal	Champlain	1916	2nd term
Philippe Dufour	Liberal	Charlevoix et Saguenay	1919	1st term
Honoré Mercier Jr.	Liberal	Châteauguay	1907, 1908	5th term*
Joseph-Arthur Gaudreault	Liberal	Chicoutimi	1919	1st term
Camille-Émile Desjarlais	Liberal	Compton	1919	1st term
Arthur Sauvé	Conservative	Deux-Montagnes	1908	4th term
Ernest Ouellet	Liberal	Dorchester	1917	2nd term
Hector Laferté	Liberal	Drummond	1916	2nd term
Georges-Stanislas Grégoire	Liberal	Frontenac	1912	3rd term
Gustave Lemieux	Liberal	Gaspé	1912	3rd term
Joseph Caron	Liberal	Hull	1917	2nd term
Andrew Philps	Liberal	Huntingdon	1913	3rd term
Adélard Forget	Liberal	Iberville	1919	1st term
Joseph-Édouard Caron	Liberal	Îles-de-la-Madeleine	1902	6th term
Aimé Ashby	Liberal	Jacques-Cartier	1916	2nd term
Pierre-Joseph Dufresne	Conservative	Joliette	1919	1st term
Charles-Adolphe Stein	Liberal	Kamouraska	1912	3rd term
Nérée Morin (1920)	Liberal	Kamouraska	1920	1st term
Honoré Achim	Liberal	Labelle	1917	2nd term
Désiré Lahaie (1922)	Liberal	Labelle	1922	1st term
Émile Moreau	Liberal	Lac-Saint-Jean	1919	1st term
Wilfrid Cédilot	Liberal	Laprairie	1916	2nd term
Walter Reed	Liberal	L'Assomption	1908	4th term
Joseph-Olier Renaud Sr.	Conservative	Laval	1919	1st term
Alfred-Valère Roy	Liberal	Lévis	1916	2nd term
Élisée Thériault	Liberal	L'Islet	1916	2nd term
Joseph-Napoléon Francoeur	Liberal	Lotbinière	1908	4th term
Adélard Laurendeau	Parti ouvrier	Maisonneuve	1919	1st term
Rodolphe Tourville	Liberal	Maskinongé	1912	3rd term
Joseph Dufour	Liberal	Matane	1919	1st term
Lauréat Lapierre	Liberal	Mégantic	1916	2nd term
Alexandre Saurette	Liberal	Missisquoi	1919	1st term
Joseph-Ferdinand Daniel	Liberal	Montcalm	1917	2nd term
Charles-Abraham Paquet	Liberal	Montmagny	1919	1st term
Louis-Alexandre Taschereau	Liberal	Montmorency	1900	6th term
Aurèle Lacombe	Parti ouvrier	Montréal-Dorion	1919	1st term
Joseph-Hercule Bedard	Liberal	Montréal-Hochelaga	1919	1st term
Ernest Poulin	Liberal	Montréal-Laurier	1919	1st term
Bernard-Augustin Conroy	Liberal	Montréal–Sainte-Anne	1919	1st term
Napoleon Séguin	Liberal	Montréal–Sainte-Marie	1908	4th term
Joseph Gauthier (1921)	Parti ouvrier	Montréal–Sainte-Marie	1921	1st term
Charles Ernest Gault	Conservative	Montréal–Saint-Georges	1907	5th term
Irénée Vautrin	Liberal	Montréal–Saint-Jacques	1919	1st term
Henry Miles	Liberal	Montréal–Saint-Laurent	1918	2nd term
Peter Bercovitch	Liberal	Montréal–Saint-Louis	1916	2nd term
Amédée Monet	Liberal	Napierville	1918	2nd term
Joseph-Alcide Savoie	Liberal	Nicolet	1917	2nd term
Wallace McDonald	Liberal	Pontiac	1919	1st term
Lomer Gouin	Liberal	Portneuf	1897	7th term
Édouard Hamel (1920)	Liberal	Portneuf	1920	1st term
Aurèle Leclerc	Liberal	Québec-Comté	1916	2nd term
Lawrence Arthur Cannon	Liberal	Québec-Centre	1916	2nd term
Louis-Alfred Létourneau	Liberal	Québec-Est	1908	4th term
Martin Madden	Liberal	Québec-Ouest	1916	2nd term
Maurice-Louis Péloquin	Liberal	Richelieu	1912	3rd term
Walter George Mitchell	Liberal	Richmond	1914	3rd term
Jacob Nicol (1921)	Liberal	Richmond	1921	1st term
Auguste-Maurice Tessier	Liberal	Rimouski	1912	3rd term
Joseph-Edmond Robert	Liberal	Rouville	1908	4th term
Armand Boisseau	Liberal	Saint-Hyacinthe	1919	1st term
Alexis Bouthillier	Liberal	Saint-Jean	1919	1st term
Georges-Isidore Delisle	Liberal	Saint-Maurice	1908	4th term
Léonide-Nestor-Arthur Ricard (1920)	Liberal	Saint-Maurice	1920	1st term
Arthur Paquet	Liberal	Saint-Sauveur	1916	2nd term
William Stephen Bullock	Liberal	Shefford	1912	3rd term
Joseph-Henri Lemay	Liberal	Sherbrooke	1919	1st term
Ludger Forest (1922)	Liberal	Sherbrooke	1922	1st term
Avila Farand	Liberal	Soulanges	1916	2nd term
Alfred-Joseph Bissonnet	Liberal	Stanstead	1913	3rd term
Télésphore Simard	Liberal	Témiscaming	1916	2nd term
Louis-Eugène-Aduire Parrot	Liberal	Témiscouata	1916	2nd term
Eugène Godbout (1921)	Liberal	Témiscouata	1921	1st term
Athanase David	Liberal	Terrebonne	1916	2nd term
Joseph-Adolphe Tessier	Liberal	Trois-Rivières	1904	5th term
Louis-Philippe Mercier (1921)	Liberal	Trois-Rivières	1921	1st term
Hormisdas Pilon	Liberal	Vaudreuil	1901	6th term
Adrien Beaudry	Liberal	Verchères	1916	2nd term
Jean-Marie Richard (1921)	Liberal	Verchères	1921	1st term
Charles Allan Smart	Conservative	Westmount	1912	3rd term
Joseph-Eugène Rhéault	Liberal	Wolfe	1919	1st term
Cyrinus Lemieux (1921)	Liberal	Wolfe	1921	1st term
Guillaume-Édouard Ouellette	Liberal	Yamaska	1905	5th term

== Other elected MLAs ==
Other MLAs were elected during the mandate

- Édouard Hamel, Quebec Liberal Party, Portneuf, October 11, 1920
- Nérée Morin, Quebec Liberal Party, Kamouraska, October 19, 1920
- Léonide-Nestor-Arthur Ricard, Quebec Liberal Party, Saint-Maurice, October 19, 1920
- Joseph-Hughes Fortier, Quebec Liberal Party, Beauce, December 15, 1921
- Jacob Nicol, Quebec Liberal Party, Richmond, December 15, 1921
- Louis-Philippe Mercier, Quebec Liberal Party, Trois-Rivières, December 15, 1921
- Cyrinus Lemieux, Quebec Liberal Party, Wolfe, December 15, 1921
- Joseph Gauthier, Parti ouvrier, Montreal-Ste-Marie, December 22, 1921
- Eugène Godbout, Quebec Liberal Party, Témiscouata, December 22, 1921
- Jean-Marie Richard, Quebec Liberal Party, Verchères, December 22, 1921
- Désiré Lahaie, Quebec Liberal Party, Labelle, August 17, 1922
- Ludger Forest, Quebec Liberal Party, Sherbrooke, September 7, 1922

== New or renamed electoral districts ==
The electoral map was reformed in 1922 prior to the elections that were held in the following year.

- Abitibi was formed from parts of Témiscamingue
- The Ottawa district was renamed Hull in 1919.
- Matapédia was formed from parts of Matane
- Montréal-Mercier was formed from parts of Montréal-Laurier and Montréal-Dorion.
- Montréal-Hochelaga was renamed Montréal-Saint-Henri.
- Montréal-Verdun was created from parts of Jacques-Cartier.
- Napierville and Laprairie merged to form Napierville-Laprairie.
- Papineau was formed from parts of Labelle.

== Cabinet Ministers ==
=== Gouin Cabinet (1919-1920) ===
- Prime Minister and Executive Council President: Lomer Gouin
- Agriculture: Joseph-Édouard Caron
- Colonisation, Mines and Fishing: Honoré Mercier (1919), Joseph-Édouard Perrault (1919–1920)
- Public Works and Labor: Louis-Alexandre Taschereau (1919), Antonin Galipeault (1919–1920)
- Lands and Forests: Jules Allard (1919), Honoré Mercier Jr (1919–1920)
- Roads: Joseph-Adolphe Tessier (1914–1916)
- Municipal Affairs: Walter Georges Mitchell
- Attorney General:Lomer Gouin (1919), Louis-Alexandre Taschereau (1919–1920)
- Provincial secretary: Louis-Jérémie Décarie (1919), Athanase David (1919–1920)
- Treasurer: Walter Georges Mitchell

=== Taschereau Cabinet (1920–1923) ===
- Prime Minister and Executive Council President: Louis-Alexandre Taschereau
- Agriculture: Joseph-Édouard Caron
- Colonisation, Mines and Fishing: Joseph-Édouard Perrault
- Public Works and Labor: Antonin Galipeault
- Lands and Forests: Honoré Mercier Jr
- Roads: Joseph-Adolphe Tessier (1920–1921), Joseph-Léonide Perron (1921–1923)
- Municipal Affairs: Walter Georges Mitchell (1920–1921), Jacob Nichol (1921–1923)
- Attorney General: Louis-Alexandre Taschereau
- Provincial secretary: Athanase David
- Treasurer: Walter Georges Mitchell (1920–1921), Jacob Nichol (1921–1923)
- Members without portfolios: John Charles Kaine, Narcisse Pérodeau, Joseph-Léonide Perron (1920–1921), Napoléon Seguin, Émile Moreau (1921–1923), Aurèle Lacombe (1921–1923)
