= 16th Quebec Legislature =

The 16th Legislative Assembly of Quebec was the provincial legislature in Quebec, Canada that existed from February 5, 1923, to May 16, 1927. The Quebec Liberal Party led by Louis-Alexandre Taschereau was the governing party.

== Seats per political party ==
- After the 1923 elections

Affiliation	Members
Liberal	63
Conservative	20
Parti ouvrier	1
Liberal Independent	1
Total	85
Government Majority	43

== Member list ==
This was the list of members of the Legislative Assembly of Quebec that were elected in the 1923 election:

Name	Party	Riding	First elected / previously elected	No. of terms
Joseph-Édouard Perrault	Liberal	Abitibi	1916	3rd term
Hector Authier (1923)	Liberal	Abitibi	1923	1st term
John Hay	Liberal	Argenteuil	1910, 1916	4th term*
Joseph-Léon Saint-Jacques (1925)	Conservative	Argenteuil	1925	1st term
Joseph-Édouard Perrault	Liberal	Arthabaska	1916	3rd term
Joseph-Émery Phaneuf	Liberal	Bagot	1913	4th term
Joseph-Hugues Fortier	Liberal	Beauce	1921	2nd term
Arthur Plante	Conservative	Beauharnois	1898, 1908, 1923	3rd term*
Antonin Galipeault	Liberal	Bellechasse	1909	5th term
Siméon Lafrenière	Liberal	Berthier	1919	2nd term
Amédée Sylvestre (1925)	Liberal	Berthier	1925	1st term
Joseph-Fabien Bugeaud	Liberal	Bonaventure	1914	4th term
Pierre-Émile Côté (1924)	Liberal	Bonaventure	1924	1st term
William Robert Oliver	Liberal	Brome	1917	3rd term
Carlton James Oliver (1923)	Liberal	Brome	1923	1st term
Alexandre Thurber	Liberal	Chambly	1923	1st term
Bruno Bordeleau	Liberal	Champlain	1916	3rd term
William-Pierre Grant (1925)	Liberal	Champlain	1925	1st term
Philippe Dufour	Liberal	Charlevoix et Saguenay	1919	2nd term
Honoré Mercier Jr.	Liberal	Châteauguay	1907, 1908	6th term*
Gustave Delisle	Liberal	Chicoutimi	1923	1st term
Jacob Nicol	Liberal	Compton	1921	2nd term
Arthur Sauvé	Conservative	Deux-Montagnes	1908	5th term
Ernest Ouellet	Liberal	Dorchester	1917	3rd term
Hector Laferté	Liberal	Drummond	1916	3rd term
Cyrille Baillargeon	Liberal	Frontenac	1923	1st term
Gustave Lemieux	Liberal	Gaspé	1912	4th term
Joseph-Roméo Lafond	Liberal	Hull	1923	1st term
Andrew Philps	Liberal	Huntingdon	1913	4th term
Lucien Lamoureux	Liberal	Iberville	1923	1st term
Joseph-Édouard Caron	Liberal	Îles-de-la-Madeleine	1902	7th term
Ésioff-Léon Patenaude	Conservative	Jacques-Cartier	1908, (Note: Laprairie) 1923	3rd term*
Victor Marchand (1925)	Liberal	Jacques-Cartier	1925	1st term
Pierre-Joseph Dufresne	Conservative	Joliette	1919	2nd term
Nérée Morin	Liberal	Kamouraska	1920	2nd term
Pierre Lortie	Liberal	Labelle	1923	1st term
Émile Moreau	Liberal	Lac-Saint-Jean	1919	2nd term
Walter Reed	Liberal	L'Assomption	1908	5th term
Joseph-Olier Renaud Sr.	Conservative	Laval	1919	2nd term
Alfred-Valère Roy	Liberal	Lévis	1916	3rd term
Élisée Thériault	Liberal	L'Islet	1916	3rd term
Joseph-Napoléon Francoeur	Liberal	Lotbinière	1908	5th term
Jean-Marie Pellerin	Conservative	Maisonneuve	1923	1st term
Rodolphe Tourville	Liberal	Maskinongé	1912	4th term
Joseph-Arthur Bergeron	Liberal	Matane	1923	1st term
Joseph Dufour	Liberal	Matapédia	1919	2nd term
Lauréat Lapierre	Liberal	Mégantic	1916	3rd term
Alexandre Saurette	Liberal	Missisquoi	1919	2nd term
Joseph-Ferdinand Daniel	Liberal	Montcalm	1917	3rd term
Charles-Abraham Paquet	Liberal	Montmagny	1919	2nd term
Louis-Alexandre Taschereau	Liberal	Montmorency	1900	7th term
Ernest Tétreau	Liberal Independent	Montréal-Dorion	1923	1st term
Alfred Duranleau	Conservative	Montréal-Laurier	1923	1st term
Adolphe L'Archevêque	Conservative	Montréal-Mercier	1923	1st term
William James Hushion	Liberal	Montréal–Sainte-Anne	1923	1st term
Joseph Henry Dillon (1924)	Liberal	Montréal–Sainte-Anne	1924	1st term
Camillien Houde	Conservative	Montréal–Sainte-Marie	1923	1st term
Charles Ernest Gault	Conservative	Montréal–Saint-Georges	1907	6th term
Joseph Allan Bray	Conservative	Montréal–Saint-Henri	1923	1st term
Eusèbe Beaudoin	Conservative	Montréal–Saint-Jacques	1923	1st term
Ernest Walter Sayer	Conservative	Montréal–Saint-Laurent	1923	1st term
Peter Bercovitch	Liberal	Montréal–Saint-Louis	1916	3rd term
Pierre-Auguste Lafleur	Conservative	Montréal-Verdun	1923	1st term
Joseph-Euclide Charbonneau	Liberal	Napierville-Laprairie	1923	1st term
Joseph-Alcide Savoie	Liberal	Nicolet	1917	3rd term
Désiré Lahaie	Liberal	Papineau	1922	2nd term
Wallace McDonald	Liberal	Pontiac	1919	2nd term
Édouard Hamel	Liberal	Portneuf	1920	2nd term
Aurèle Leclerc	Liberal	Québec-Comté	1916	3rd term
Ludger Bastien (1924)	Liberal	Québec-Comté	1924	1st term
Pierre-Vincent Faucher	Conservative	Québec-Centre	1923	1st term
Louis-Alfred Létourneau	Liberal	Québec-Est	1908	5th term
Martin Madden	Liberal	Québec-Ouest	1916	3rd term
Jean-Baptiste Lafrenière	Liberal	Richelieu	1923	1st term
Georges-Ervé Denault	Liberal	Richmond	1923	1st term
Stanislas-Edmond Desmarais (1923)	Liberal	Richmond	1923	1st term
Louis-Joseph Moreault	Liberal	Rimouski	1923	1st term
Cyril-Améric Bernard	Liberal	Rouville	1923	1st term
Télesphore-Damien Bouchard	Liberal	Saint-Hyacinthe	1912, 1923	3rd term*
Alexis Bouthillier	Liberal	Saint-Jean	1919	2nd term
Léonide-Nestor-Arthur Ricard	Liberal	Saint-Maurice	1920	2nd term
Alphonse-Edgar Guillemette (1924)	Liberal	Saint-Maurice	1924	1st term
Pierre Bertrand	Parti ouvrier	Saint-Sauveur	1923	1st term
William Stephen Bullock	Liberal	Shefford	1912	4th term
Moïse O'Bready	Conservative	Sherbrooke	1923	1st term
Armand-Charles Crépeau (1924)	Conservative	Sherbrooke	1924	1st term
Joseph-Arthur Lortie	Conservative	Soulanges	1923	1st term
Alfred-Joseph Bissonnet	Liberal	Stanstead	1913	4th term
Télésphore Simard	Liberal	Témiscamingue	1916	3rd term
Joseph Miljours (1924)	Liberal	Témiscamingue	1924	1st term
Jules Langlais	Conservative	Témiscouata	1923	1st term
Athanase David	Liberal	Terrebonne	1916	3rd term
Louis-Philippe Mercier	Liberal	Trois-Rivières	1921	2nd term
Hormisdas Pilon	Liberal	Vaudreuil	1901	7th term
Jean-Marie Richard	Liberal	Verchères	1921	2nd term
Charles Allan Smart	Conservative	Westmount	1912	4th term
Cyrénus Lemieux	Liberal	Wolfe	1921	2nd term
Guillaume-Édouard Ouellette	Liberal	Yamaska	1905	6th term
David Laperrière (1923)	Liberal	Yamaska	1923	1st term

== Other elected MLAs ==
Other MLAs were elected during the term in by-elections

- Hector Authier, Quebec Liberal Party, Abitibi, October 22, 1923
- Carlton James Oliver, Quebec Liberal Party, Brome, October 22, 1923
- Stanislas-Edmond Desmarais, Quebec Liberal Party, Richmond, October 22, 1923
- David Laperrière, Quebec Liberal Party, Yamaska, October 22, 1923
- Pierre-Émile Côté, Quebec Liberal Party, Bonaventure, November 5, 1924
- Ludger Bastien, Quebec Conservative Party, Québec, November 5, 1924
- Alphonse-Edgar Guillemette, Quebec Liberal Party, Saint-Maurice, November 5, 1924
- Armand-Charles Crépeau, Quebec Conservative Party, Sherbrooke, November 5, 1924
- Joseph Miljours, Quebec Liberal Party, Témiscamingue, November 28, 1924
- Joseph-Léon Saint-Jacques, Quebec Conservative Party, Argenteuil, November 30, 1925
- Amédée Sylvestre, Quebec Liberal Party, Berthier, November 30, 1925
- William-Pierre Grant, Quebec Liberal Party, Champlain, November 30, 1925
- Victor Marchand, Quebec Liberal Party, Jacques-Cartier, November 30, 1925

== Cabinet Ministers ==
- Prime Minister and Executive Council President: Louis-Alexandre Taschereau
- Agriculture: Joseph-Édouard Caron
- Colonisation, Mines and Fishing: Joseph-Édouard Perrault
- Public Works and Labor: Antonin Galipeault
- Lands and Forests: Honoré Mercier Jr
- Roads: Joseph-Léonide Perron
- Municipal Affairs: Jacob Nicol (1923-1924), Louis-Alexandre Taschereau (1924-1927)
- Attorney General: Louis-Alexandre Taschereau
- Provincial secretary: Athanase David
- Treasurer: Jacob Nicol
- Members without portfolios: Martin Madden, Laureat Lapierre (1924-1927), Joseph Henry Dillon (1927), Alfred Leduc (1927)
