= 14th Quebec Legislature =

The 14th Legislative Assembly of Quebec was the provincial legislature in Quebec, Canada that existed from May 22, 1916, to June 23, 1919. The Quebec Liberal Party led by Lomer Gouin was the governing party.

== Seats per political party ==
- After the 1916 elections

Affiliation	Members
Liberal	75
Conservative	6
Total	81
Government Majority	69

== Member list ==
This was the list of members of the Legislative Assembly of Quebec that were elected in the 1916 election:

Name	Party	Riding	First elected / previously elected	No. of terms
John Hay	Liberal	Argenteuil	1910, 1916	2nd term*
Joseph-Édouard Perrault	Liberal	Arthabaska	1916	1st term
Joseph-Émery Phaneuf	Liberal	Bagot	1913	2nd term
Arthur Godbout	Liberal	Beauce	1902	5th term
Edmond Arthur Robert	Liberal	Beauharnois	1912	2nd term
Antonin Galipeault	Liberal	Bellechasse	1909	3rd term
Joseph Lafontaine	Liberal	Berthier	1904, 1916	4th term*
Joseph-Fabien Bugeaud	Liberal	Bonaventure	1914	2nd term
William Frederick Bilas	Liberal	Brome	1906	4th term
William Robert Oliver (1917)	Liberal	Brome	1917	1st term
Eugène Merril Lesieur Desaulniers	Liberal	Chambly	1909	3rd term
Bruno Bordeleau	Liberal	Champlain	1916	1st term
Pierre D'Auteuil	Conservative	Charlevoix et Saguenay	1897, 1904	5th term*
Honoré Mercier Jr.	Liberal	Châteauguay	1907, 1908	4th term*
Honoré Petit	Liberal	Chicoutimi	1892	7th term
George Nathaniel Scott	Liberal	Compton	1912	2nd term
Arthur Sauvé	Conservative	Deux-Montagnes	1908	3rd term
Lucien Cannon	Liberal	Dorchester	1913	2nd term
Ernest Ouellet (1917)	Liberal	Dorchester	1917	1st term
Hector Laferté	Liberal	Drummond	1916	1st term
Georges-Stanislas Grégoire	Liberal	Frontenac	1912	2nd term
Gustave Lemieux	Liberal	Gaspé	1912	2nd term
Andrew Philps	Liberal	Huntingdon	1913	2nd term
Joseph-Aldéric Benoît	Liberal	Iberville	1906	4th term
Joseph-Édouard Caron	Liberal	Îles-de-la-Madeleine	1902	5th term
Aimé Ashby	Liberal	Jacques-Cartier	1916	1st term
Ernest Hébert	Liberal	Joliette	1916	1st term
Charles-Adolphe Stein	Liberal	Kamouraska	1912	2nd term
Hyacinthe-Adélard Fortier	Liberal	Labelle	1912	2nd term
Honoré Achim (1917)	Liberal	Labelle	1917	1st term
Narcisse Turcotte	Conservative	Lac-Saint-Jean	1916	1st term
Wilfrid Cédilot	Liberal	Laprairie	1916	1st term
Walter Reed	Liberal	L'Assomption	1908	3rd term
Joseph-Wenceslas Lévesque	Liberal	Laval	1908	3rd term
Alfred-Valère Roy	Liberal	Lévis	1916	1st term
Élisée Thériault	Liberal	L'Islet	1916	1st term
Joseph-Napoléon Francoeur	Liberal	Lotbinière	1908	3rd term
Jérémie-Louis Décarie	Liberal	Maisonneuve	1904	4th term
Rodolphe Tourville	Liberal	Maskinongé	1912	2nd term
Donat Caron	Liberal	Matane	1899	6th term
Octave Fortin (1918)	Liberal	Matane	1918	1st term
Lauréat Lapierre	Liberal	Mégantic	1916	1st term
Joseph-Jean-Baptiste Gosselin	Liberal	Missisquoi	1900	5th term
Joseph-Alcide Dupuis	Liberal	Montcalm	1916	1st term
Joseph-Ferdinand Daniel (1917)	Liberal	Montcalm	1917	1st term
Joseph-Elzéar Masson	Liberal	Montmagny	1916	1st term
Louis-Alexandre Taschereau	Liberal	Montmorency	1900	5th term
Georges Mayrand	Liberal	Montréal-Dorion	1912	2nd term
Séverin Létourneau	Liberal	Montréal-Hochelaga	1912	2nd term
Napoléon Turcot	Liberal	Montréal-Laurier	1912	2nd term
Denis Tansey	Conservative	Montréal–Sainte-Anne	1908, 1912	3rd term*
Napoléon Séguin	Liberal	Montréal–Sainte-Marie	1908	3rd term
Charles Ernest Gault	Conservative	Montréal–Saint-Georges	1907	4th term
Clément Robillard	Liberal	Montréal–Saint-Jacques	1909	3rd term
John Thomas Finnie	Liberal	Montréal–Saint-Laurent	1908	3rd term
Henry Miles (1918)	Liberal	Montréal–Saint-Laurent	1918	1st term
Peter Bercovitch	Liberal	Montréal–Saint-Louis	1916	1st term
Cyprien Doris	Liberal	Napierville	1905	4th term
Amédée Monet (1918)	Liberal	Napierville	1918	1st term
Arthur Trahan	Liberal	Nicolet	1913	2nd term
Joseph-Alcide Savoie (1917)	Liberal	Nicolet	1917	1st term
Ferdinand-Ambroise Gendron	Liberal	Ottawa	1904	4th term
Joseph Caron (1917)	Liberal	Ottawa	1917	1st term
William Hodgins	Liberal	Pontiac	1916	1st term
Lomer Gouin	Liberal	Portneuf	1897	6th term
Aurèle Leclerc	Liberal	Québec-Comté	1916	1st term
Lawrence Arthur Cannon	Liberal	Québec-Centre	1916	1st term
Louis-Alfred Létourneau	Liberal	Québec-Est	1908	3rd term
Martin Madden	Liberal	Québec-Ouest	1916	1st term
Maurice-Louis Péloquin	Liberal	Richelieu	1912	2nd term
Walter George Mitchell	Liberal	Richmond	1914	2nd term
Auguste-Maurice Tessier	Liberal	Rimouski	1912	2nd term
Joseph-Edmond Robert	Liberal	Rouville	1908	3rd term
Télesphore-Damien Bouchard	Liberal	Saint-Hyacinthe	1912	2nd term
Marcellin Robert	Liberal	Saint-Jean	1913	2nd term
Georges-Isidore Delisle	Liberal	Saint-Maurice	1908	3rd term
Arthur Paquet	Liberal	Saint-Sauveur	1916	1st term
William Stephen Bullock	Liberal	Shefford	1912	2nd term
Calixte-Émile Therrien	Liberal	Sherbrooke	1911	3rd term
Avila Farand	Liberal	Soulanges	1916	1st term
Alfred-Joseph Bissonnet	Liberal	Stanstead	1913	2nd term
Télésphore Simard	Liberal	Témiscaming	1916	1st term
Louis-Eugène-Aduire Parrot	Liberal	Témiscouata	1916	1st term
Athanase David	Liberal	Terrebonne	1916	1st term
Joseph-Adolphe Tessier	Liberal	Trois-Rivières	1904	4th term
Hormisdas Pilon	Liberal	Vaudreuil	1901	5th term
Adrien Beaudry	Liberal	Verchères	1916	1st term
Charles Allan Smart	Conservative	Westmount	1912	2nd term
Napoléon-Pierre Tanguay	Liberal	Wolfe	1904	4th term
Guillaume-Édouard Ouellette	Liberal	Yamaska	1905	4th term

== Other elected MLAs ==
Other MLAs were elected in this mandate during by-elections

- William Robert Oliver, Quebec Liberal Party, Brome, November 12, 1917
- Joseph-Ferdinand Daniel, Quebec Liberal Party, Montcalm, November 12, 1917
- Ernest Ouellet, Quebec Liberal Party, Dorchester, December 15, 1917
- Joseph Caron, Quebec Liberal Party, Ottawa, December 15, 1917
- Honoré Achim, Quebec Liberal Party, Labelle, December 15, 1917
- Joseph-Alcide Savoie, Quebec Liberal Party, Nicolet, December 15, 1917
- Octave Fortin, Quebec Liberal Party, Matane, December 27, 1918
- Henry Miles, Quebec Liberal Party, Montréal-St-Laurent, December 27, 1918
- Amédeée Monet, Quebec Liberal Party, Napierville, December 27, 1918

== Cabinet Ministers ==
- Prime Minister and Executive Council President: Lomer Gouin
- Agriculture: Joseph-Édouard Caron
- Colonisation, Mines and Fishing: Charles Devlin Ramsey (1912-1914), Honoré Mercier Jr. (1914-1916)
- Public Works and Labor: Louis-Alexandre Taschereau
- Lands and Forests: Jules Allard
- Roads: Joseph-Édouard Caron (1912-1914), Joseph-Adolphe Tessier (1914-1916)
- Municipal Affairs: Walter Georges Mitchell (1918-1919)
- Attorney General:Lomer Gouin
- Provincial secretary: Louis-Jérémie Décarie
- Treasurer: Peter Samuel George MacKenzie (1912-1914), Walter Georges Mitchell (1914-1916)
- Members without portfolios: Napoleon Séguin (1919)
