= 17th Quebec Legislature =

The 17th Quebec Legislature was the provincial legislature that existed in Quebec, Canada from May 16, 1927, to July 30, 1931. The Liberal Party, led by Louis-Alexandre Taschereau as Premier of Quebec had a majority of seats in the Legislative Assembly of Quebec and was the governing party.

== Seats per political party ==
- After the 1927 elections

Affiliation	Members
Liberal	75
Conservative	9
Labour	1
Total	85
Government Majority	66

== Member list ==
This was the list of members of the Legislative Assembly of Quebec that were elected in the 1927 election:

Name	Party	Riding	First elected / previously elected	No. of terms
Hector Authier	Liberal	Abitibi	1923	2nd term
Georges-Étienne Dansereau	Liberal	Argenteuil	1927	1st term
Joseph-Édouard Perrault	Liberal	Arthabaska	1925	2nd term
Joseph-Émery Phaneuf	Liberal	Bagot	1916	4th term
Joseph-Hugues Fortier	Liberal	Beauce	1921	3rd term
Joseph-Édouard Fortin (1929)	Liberal	Beauce	1929	1st term
Louis-Joseph Papineau	Liberal	Beauharnois	1927	1st term
Antonin Galipeault	Liberal	Bellechasse	1909	6th term
Robert Taschereau (1930)	Liberal	Bellechasse	1930	1st term
Cléophas Bastien	Liberal	Berthier	1927	1st term
Pierre-Émile Côté	Liberal	Bonaventure	1924	2nd term
Carlton James Oliver	Liberal	Brome	1923	2nd term
Alexandre Thurber	Liberal	Chambly	1923	2nd term
William-Pierre Grant	Liberal	Champlain	1925	2nd term
Edgar Rochette	Liberal	Charlevoix et Saguenay	1927	1st term
Honoré Mercier Jr.	Liberal	Châteauguay	1907, 1908	7th term*
Gustave Delisle	Liberal	Chicoutimi	1923	2nd term
Jacob Nicol	Liberal	Compton	1921	3rd term
Andrew Ross McMaster (1929)	Liberal	Compton	1929	1st term
Arthur Sauvé	Conservative	Deux-Montagnes	1908	6th term
Paul Sauvé (1930)	Conservative	Deux-Montagnes	1930	1st term
Ernest Ouellet	Liberal	Dorchester	1917	4th term
Hector Laferté	Liberal	Drummond	1916	4th term
Cyrille Baillargeon	Liberal	Frontenac	1923	2nd term
Gustave Lemieux	Liberal	Gaspé	1912	5th term
Aimé Guertin	Conservative	Hull	1927	1st term
Andrew Philps	Liberal	Huntingdon	1913	5th term
Martin Bettie Fisher (1930)	Conservative	Huntingdon	1930	1st term
Lucien Lamoureux	Liberal	Iberville	1923	2nd term
Joseph-Édouard Caron	Liberal	Îles-de-la-Madeleine	1902	8th term
Amédée Caron (1928)	Liberal	Îles-de-la-Madeleine	1928	1st term
Victor Marchand	Liberal	Jacques-Cartier	1925	2nd term
Lucien Dugas	Liberal	Joliette	1927	1st term
Nérée Morin	Liberal	Kamouraska	1920	3rd term
Pierre Gagnon (1927)	Liberal	Kamouraska	1927	1st term
Pierre Lortie	Liberal	Labelle	1923	2nd term
Émile Moreau	Liberal	Lac-Saint-Jean	1919	3rd term
Walter Reed	Liberal	L'Assomption	1908	6th term
Joseph-Olier Renaud Sr.	Conservative	Laval	1919	3rd term
Alfred-Valère Roy	Liberal	Lévis	1916	4th term
Élisée Thériault	Liberal	L'Islet	1916	4th term
Adélard Godbout (1929)	Liberal	L'Islet	1929	1st term
Joseph-Napoléon Francoeur	Liberal	Lotbinière	1908	6th term
William Tremblay	Labour	Maisonneuve	1927	1st term
Joseph-William Gagnon	Liberal	Maskinongé	1927	1st term
Louis-Joseph Thisdel (1930)	Liberal	Maskinongé	1930	1st term
Joseph-Arthur Bergeron	Liberal	Matane	1923	2nd term
Joseph Dufour	Liberal	Matapédia	1919	3rd term
Lauréat Lapierre	Liberal	Mégantic	1916	4th term
Alexandre Saurette	Liberal	Missisquoi	1919	3rd term
Joseph-Ferdinand Daniel	Liberal	Montcalm	1917	4th term
Joseph-Léonide Perron (1929)	Liberal	Montcalm	1910, (Note: Gaspé) 1912, (Note: Verchères) 1929	3rd term*
Charles-Abraham Paquet	Liberal	Montmagny	1919	3rd term
Louis-Alexandre Taschereau	Liberal	Montmorency	1900	8th term
Aldéric Blain	Conservative	Montréal-Dorion	1927	1st term
Ernest Poulin	Liberal	Montréal-Laurier	1919, 1927	2nd term*
Anatole Plante	Liberal	Montréal-Mercier	1927	1st term
Joseph Henry Dillon	Liberal	Montréal–Sainte-Anne	1924	2nd term
Joseph Gauthier	Liberal	Montréal–Sainte-Marie	1921, 1927	2nd term*
Camillien Houde (1928)	Conservative	Montréal–Sainte-Marie	1923, 1928	2nd term*
Charles Ernest Gault	Conservative	Montréal–Saint-Georges	1907	7th term
Alfred Leduc	Liberal	Montréal–Saint-Henri	1927	1st term
Irénée Vautrin	Liberal	Montréal–Saint-Jacques	1919, 1927	2nd term*
Joseph Cohen	Liberal	Montréal–Saint-Laurent	1927	1st term
Peter Bercovitch	Liberal	Montréal–Saint-Louis	1916	4th term
Pierre-Auguste Lafleur	Conservative	Montréal-Verdun	1923	2nd term
Joseph-Euclide Charbonneau	Liberal	Napierville-Laprairie	1923	2nd term
Joseph-Alcide Savoie	Liberal	Nicolet	1923	2nd term
Désiré Lahaie	Liberal	Papineau	1922	3rd term
Wallace McDonald	Liberal	Pontiac	1919	3rd term
Édouard Hamel	Liberal	Portneuf	1920	3rd term
Pierre Gauthier (1927)	Liberal	Portneuf	1927	1st term
Joseph-Ephraim Bédard	Liberal	Québec-Comté	1927	1st term
Joseph Samson	Liberal	Québec-Centre	1927	1st term
Louis-Alfred Létourneau	Liberal	Québec-Est	1908	6th term
Oscar Drouin (1928)	Liberal	Québec-Est	1928	1st term
Joseph Ignatius Power	Liberal	Québec-Ouest	1927	1st term
Jean-Baptiste Lafrenière	Liberal	Richelieu	1923	2nd term
Avila Turcotte (1929)	Liberal	Richelieu	1929	1st term
Stanislas-Edmond Desmarais	Liberal	Richmond	1923	2nd term
Louis-Joseph Moreault	Liberal	Rimouski	1923	2nd term
Cyril-Améric Bernard	Liberal	Rouville	1923	2nd term
Télesphore-Damien Bouchard	Liberal	Saint-Hyacinthe	1912, 1923	4th term*
Alexis Bouthillier	Liberal	Saint-Jean	1919	3rd term
Joseph-Auguste Frigon	Liberal	Saint-Maurice	1927	1st term
Charles-Édouard Cantin	Liberal	Saint-Sauveur	1927	1st term
William Stephen Bullock	Liberal	Shefford	1912	5th term
Armand-Charles Crépeau	Conservative	Sherbrooke	1924	2nd term
Avila Ferland	Liberal	Soulanges	1916, 1927	3rd term*
Alfred-Joseph Bissonnet	Liberal	Stanstead	1913	5th term
Joseph-Édouard Piché	Liberal	Témiscamingue	1927	1st term
Léon Casgrain	Liberal	Témiscouata	1927	1st term
Athanase David	Liberal	Terrebonne	1916	4th term
Maurice Duplessis	Conservative	Trois-Rivières	1927	1st term
Hormisdas Pilon	Liberal	Vaudreuil	1901	8th term
Félix Messier	Liberal	Verchères	1927	1st term
Charles Allan Smart	Conservative	Westmount	1912	5th term
Cyrénus Lemieux	Liberal	Wolfe	1921	3rd term
David Lapperrière	Liberal	Yamaska	1923	2nd term

== Other elected MLAs ==
Other MLAs were elected during by-elections in this term

- Pierre Gagnon, Liberal Party, Kamouraska, October 31, 1927
- Pierre Gauthier, Liberal Party, Portneuf, October 31, 1927
- Amédée Caron, Liberal Party, Iles-de-la-Madeleine, July 14, 1928
- Oscar Drouin, Liberal Party, Québec-Est, October 24, 1928
- Camillien Houde, Conservative Party, Montréal-Sainte-Marie, October 24, 1928
- Adélard Godbout, Liberal Party, L'Islet, May 13, 1929
- Andrew Ross McMaster, Liberal Party, Compton, September 30, 1929
- Avila Turcotte, Liberal Party, Richelieu, October 28, 1929
- Joseph-Léonide Perron, Liberal Party, Montcalm, November 16, 1929
- Joseph-Édouard Fortin, Liberal Party, Beauce, December 9, 1929
- Robert Taschereau, Liberal Party, Bellechasse, October 20, 1930
- Paul Sauvé, Conservative Party, Deux-Montagnes, November 4, 1930
- Martin Beattie Fisher, Conservative Party, Huntingdon, November 4, 1930
- Louis-Joseph Thisdel, Liberal Party, Maskinongé, November 4, 1930

== Cabinet Ministers ==
- Prime Minister and Executive Council President: Louis-Alexandre Taschereau
- Agriculture: Joseph-Édouard Caron (1927–1929), Joseph-Léonide Perron (1929–1930), Adélard Godbout (1930–1931)
- Colonization, Mines and Fishing: Joseph-Édouard Perrault (1927–1929), Hector Laferté (1929–1930)
  - Colonization, Hunting and Fishing: Hector Laferté (1929–1930)
  - Mines: Joseph-Édouard Perrault (1930–1931)
- Public Works and Labour: Antonin Galipeault (1927–1930), Joseph-Napoléon Francoeur (1930–1931)
- Lands and Forests: Honoré Mercier Jr
- Roads: Joseph-Léonide Perron (1927–1929), Joseph-Édouard Perrault (1929–1931)
- Municipal Affairs: Louis-Alexandre Taschereau
- Attorney General: Louis-Alexandre Taschereau
- Provincial secretary: Athanase David
- Treasurer: Jacob Nicol (1927–1929), Andrew Ross McMaster (1929–1930), Gordon Wallace Scott (1930), Louis-Alexandre Taschereau (1930–1931)
- Members without portfolios: Joseph-Charles-Ernest Ouellet (1929–1931), Narcisse Pérodeau (1929–1931), Gordon Wallace Scott (1930–1931)

== New electoral districts ==
The electoral map was reformed in 1930 and the new map was first used in the general election of August 24, 1931.

- Gaspé was split into two ridings: Gaspé-Nord and Gaspé-Sud.
- Gatineau was created from parts of Hull.
- Laviolette was created from parts of Champlain.
- Roberval was created from parts of Lac-Saint-Jean
- Rivière-du-Loup was created from parts of Témiscouata.
