= Mayrand =

Mayrand may refer to:

== People ==
- Edward Mayrand (1947–2011), American serial killer
- Étienne Mayrand (1776–1872), Quebec businessman and politician
- Georges Mayrand (1876–1951), Canadian politician in Quebec
- Hormidas Mayrand (1858–1928), Canadian politician in Quebec
- Marc Mayrand, Canadian Chief Electoral Officer

== Place ==
- Roche-Charles-la-Mayrand, commune in France
