= 1997 Bloc Québécois leadership election =

Political party leadership election in Canada

← 1996	March 15, 1997	2011 →
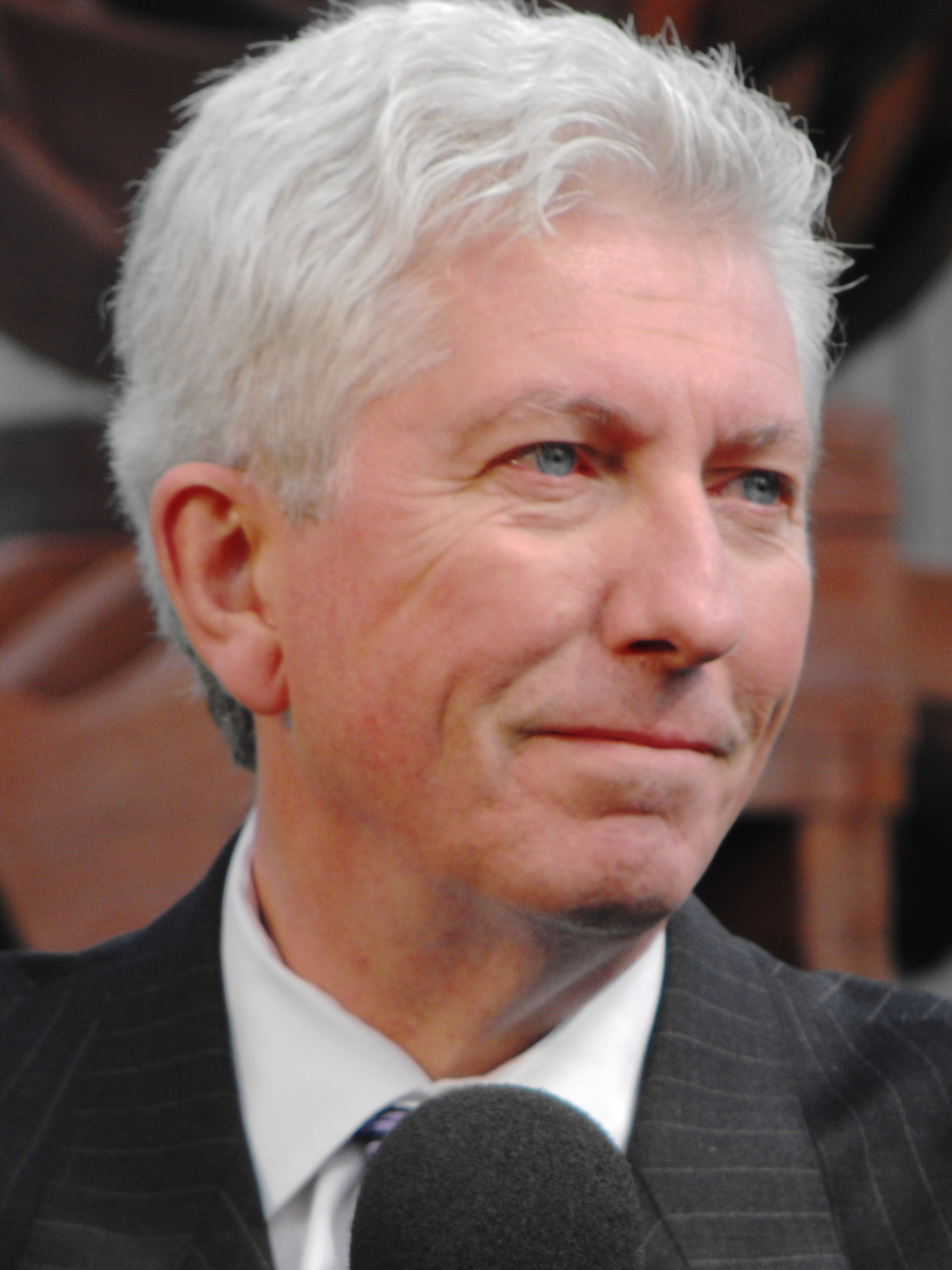

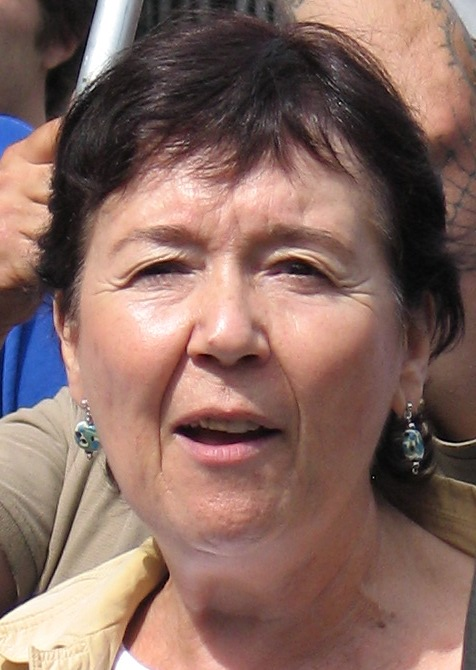
		YD
Candidate	Gilles Duceppe	Yves Duhaime
Riding	Laurier—Sainte-Marie	N/A (Note: Former member of the National Assembly of Quebec for Saint-Maurice.)
Final ballot	25,561 (52.77%)	16,408 (33.87%)
First ballot	21,268 (43.91%)	16,408 (33.87%)
	RB
Candidate	Rodrigue Biron	Francine Lalonde
Riding	N/A (Note: Former member of the National Assembly of Quebec for Lotbinière.)	Mercier
Final ballot	6,468 (13.35%)	Eliminated
First ballot	6,468 (13.35%)	2,671 (5.51%)
Leader before election
Michel Gauthier
Elected Leader
Gilles Duceppe

1997 Bloc Québécois leadership election
- Date: March 15, 1997
- Resigning leader: Michel Gauthier
- Won by: Gilles Duceppe
- Ballots: 2
- Candidates: 6

The 1997 Bloc Québécois leadership election was the leadership election that picked the new leader to replace Michel Gauthier as leader. The leadership election was conducted by a one member, one vote (OMOV) process involving all party members. Voters were asked to list their first, second and third choices on the ballot. Bloc MP Gilles Duceppe won the leadership election.

== Timeline ==
- February 17, 1996: Michel Gauthier became leader of the Bloc Québécois.
- March 15, 1997: Gilles Duceppe won the leadership election on the 2nd ballot.

== Candidates ==
Name	Riding	Notes	Source
Gilles Duceppe	Laurier—Sainte-Marie	Became the first elected Bloc Québécois member of Parliament by winning a 1990 by-election in Laurier—Sainte-Marie	
Yves Duhaime		MNA for Saint-Maurice (1976–1985)	
Rodrigue Biron		MNA for Lotbinière (1976–1985) and leader of Union nationale (1976–1980)	
Francine Lalonde	Mercier	Member of Parliament for Mercier (1993–2004) and for la Pointe-de-l'Île (2004–2011). Joined the Bloc Québécois on October 25, 1993	
Daniel Turp			
Pierrette Venne	Saint-Hubert	Member of Parliament for Saint-Hubert (1988–2004). Originally elected as a Progressive Conservative but joined the Bloc Québécois on August 12, 1991	

== Result ==
Support by Ballot
Candidate	1st ballot		2nd ballot	
Candidate	Votes cast	%	Votes cast	%
Gilles Duceppe	21,268	43.91%	25,561	52.77%
Yves Duhaime	16,408	33.87%	16,408	33.87%
Rodrique Biron	6,468	13.35%	6,468	13.35%
Francine Lalonde	2,671	5.51%	Eliminated	
Daniel Turp	1,081	2.23%	Eliminated	
Pierette Venne	541	1.12%	Eliminated	
Total	48,437	100.0%	48,437	100.0%
