= Séminaire Sainte-Marie =

Location
- 5655, Boul. des Hêtres; Shawinigan, Quebec; Canada; 46.5746°N 72.7278°W

Information
- School type: Private
- Motto: in veritate et caritate (in truth and charity)
- Religious affiliation: Roman Catholic
- Established: 1950
- Principal: Mme. Plante
- Language: French
- Team name: Cactus

Séminaire Sainte-Marie is a French-speaking and Catholic private school based in Shawinigan, Quebec.

== History ==
The institution was founded in 1950 as an all-boy classical college. In the wake of the education reform implemented during the Quiet Revolution, the Séminaire became a secondary school (middle and high school levels) and opened its doors to female students.

Well until the late 1980s, it offered compulsory Latin studies. The school has been hosting an IB Diploma Programme since 1998.

== Prominent alumni ==
The Séminaire's former students include:

=== Federal politics ===
- Jean Chrétien, Prime Minister of Canada from 1993 to 2003
- Gilles Grondin, former Member of the Parliament of Canada

=== Provincial politics ===
- Yves Duhaime
- Jean-Pierre Jolivet
- Claude Pinard
- Luc Trudel

=== Others ===
- Martin Gélinas, professional ice hockey player
- Éveline Gélinas, actress
