= Saint-Maurice (provincial electoral district) =

Coordinates: 46.506°N 72.744°W

Quebec electoral district

Defunct provincial electoral district
- Legislature: National Assembly of Quebec
- District created: 1867
- District abolished: 2017
- First contested: 1867
- Last contested: 2014

Demographics
- Population (2011): 44,635
- Electors (2012): 36,513
- Area (km²): 652.6
- Census division(s): Shawinigan (part), Les Chenaux (part), Maskinongé (part)
- Census subdivision(s): Shawinigan (part), Notre-Dame-du-Mont-Carmel, Saint-Boniface, Saint-Mathieu-du-Parc

Saint-Maurice (French pronunciation: [sɛ̃ mɔʁis]) was a provincial electoral district located in the Mauricie region of Quebec, Canada. It includes part of the city of Shawinigan; it does not, however, include the parish municipality of Saint-Maurice (although it borders on it).

It was created for the 1867 election, and an electoral district of that name existed even earlier: see Saint-Maurice (Lower Canada) and Saint-Maurice (Province of Canada).

In the change from the 2001 to the 2011 electoral map, its territory was unchanged. Following the change in the 2017 electoral map, the riding will be dissolved into the new riding of Laviolette–Saint-Maurice and Maskinongé.

== Members of the Legislative Assembly / National Assembly ==
| Legislature | Years | Member | Party |
|---|---|---|---|
| 1st | 1867–1871 | Abraham Lesieur Desaulniers | Conservative |
| 2nd | 1871–1875 | Elzéar Gérin | Conservative |
| 3rd | 1875–1878 | Élie Lacerte | Conservative |
| 4th | 1878–1881 | François-Sévère Lesieur Desaulniers | Conservative |
| 5th | 1881–1886 | François-Sévère Lesieur Desaulniers | Conservative |
| 6th | 1886–1890 | Nérée Le Noblet Duplessis | Conservative |
| 7th | 1890–1892 | Nérée Le Noblet Duplessis | Conservative |
| 8th | 1892–1897 | Nérée Le Noblet Duplessis | Conservative |
| 9th | 1897–1900 | Nérée Le Noblet Duplessis | Conservative |
| 10th | 1900–1904 | Louis-Philippe Fiset | Liberal |
| 11th | 1904–1908 | Louis-Philippe Fiset | Liberal |
| 12th | 1908–1912 | Georges-Isidore Delisle | Liberal |
| 13th | 1912–1916 | Georges-Isidore Delisle | Liberal |
| 14th | 1916–1919 | Georges-Isidore Delisle | Liberal |
| 15th | 1919–1920† | Georges-Isidore Delisle | Liberal |
| 15th | 1920–1923 | Léonide-Nestor-Arthur Ricard | Liberal |
| 16th | 1923–1924† | Léonide-Nestor-Arthur Ricard | Liberal |
| 16th | 1924–1927 | Alphonse-Edgar Guillemette | Liberal |
| 17th | 1927–1931 | Joseph-Auguste Frigon | Liberal |
| 18th | 1931–1935 | Joseph-Auguste Frigon | Liberal |
| 19th | 1935–1936 | Marc Trudel | Action libérale nationale |
| 20th | 1936–1939 | Marc Trudel | Union Nationale |
| 21st | 1939–1944 | Polydore Beaulac | Liberal |
| 22nd | 1944–1948 | Marc Trudel | Union Nationale |
| 23rd | 1948–1952 | Marc Trudel | Union Nationale |
| 24th | 1952–1956 | René Hamel | Liberal |
| 25th | 1956–1960 | René Hamel | Liberal |
| 26th | 1960–1962 | René Hamel | Liberal |
| 27th | 1962–1964 | René Hamel | Liberal |
| 27th | 1965–1966 | Jean-Guy Trépanier | Liberal |
| 28th | 1966–1970 | Philippe Demers | Union Nationale |
| 29th | 1970–1973 | Philippe Demers | Union Nationale |
| 30th | 1973–1976 | Marcel Bérard | Liberal |
| 31st | 1976–1981 | Yves Duhaime | Parti Québécois |
| 32nd | 1981–1985 | Yves Duhaime | Parti Québécois |
| 33rd | 1985–1989 | Yvon Lemire | Liberal |
| 34th | 1989–1994 | Yvon Lemire | Liberal |
| 35th | 1994–1998 | Claude Pinard | Parti Québécois |
| 36th | 1998–2003 | Claude Pinard | Parti Québécois |
| 37th | 2003–2007 | Claude Pinard | Parti Québécois |
| 38th | 2007–2008 | Robert Deschamps | Action démocratique |
| 39th | 2008–2012 | Claude Pinard | Parti Québécois |
| 40th | 2012–2014 | Luc Trudel | Parti Québécois |
| 41st | 2014–2018 | Pierre Giguère | Liberal |

== Election results ==
2014 Quebec general election
| Party | Candidate | Votes | % | ±% |
|---|---|---|---|---|
| Liberal | Pierre Giguère | 8,244 | 33.59 | +6.43 |
| Parti Québécois | Luc Trudel | 7,591 | 30.93 | -4.72 |
| Coalition Avenir Québec | Stéphane Mongeau | 6,982 | 28.45 | -0.00 |
| Québec solidaire | Marie-Line Audet | 1,304 | 5.31 | +0.57 |
| Conservative | Jonathan Lapointe | 268 | 1.09 | – |
| Option nationale | Jean Guillemette | 152 | 0.62 | -1.35 |
| Total valid votes | | 24,541 | 97.87 | – |
| Total rejected ballots | | 533 | 2.13 | +0.03 |
| Turnout | | 25,074 | 68.30 | -5.25 |
| Electors on the lists | | 36,712 | – | – |
| Liberal gain from Parti Québécois | | Swing | | +5.57 |

2012 Quebec general election
| Party | Candidate | Votes | % | ±% |
|---|---|---|---|---|
| Parti Québécois | Luc Trudel | 9,395 | 35.65 | -5.76 |
| Coalition Avenir Québec | Pierre Giguère | 7,498 | 28.45 | +13.64* |
| Liberal | Robert Pilotte | 7,158 | 27.16 | -11.18 |
| Québec solidaire | Luc Lafrance | 1,250 | 4.74 | +2.72 |
| Option nationale | Nathalie Lortie | 519 | 1.97 | – |
| Independent | Marie-Paule Bertrand | 442 | 1.68 | – |
| Unité Nationale | Gilles Noël | 90 | 0.34 | – |
| Total valid votes | | 26,352 | 97.90 | – |
| Total rejected ballots | | 565 | 2.10 | – |
| Turnout | | 26,917 | 73.55 | +14.05 |
| Electors on the lists | | 36,598 | – | – |
| Parti Québécois hold | | Swing | | -9.70 |

* Result compared to Action démocratique

2008 Quebec general election
| Party | Candidate | Votes | % | ±% |
|---|---|---|---|---|
| Parti Québécois | Claude Pinard | 8,835 | 41.41 | +8.68 |
| Liberal | Céline Trépanier | 8,182 | 38.34 | +13.34 |
| Action démocratique | Robert Deschamps | 3,161 | 14.81 | -22.91 |
| Green | Stéphane Normandin | 449 | 2.10 | – |
| Québec solidaire | Allison Molesworth | 432 | 2.02 | -1.05 |
| Independent | Yves Demers | 279 | 1.31 | – |
| Total valid votes | | 21,338 | 98.03 | – |
| Total rejected ballots | | 428 | 1.97 | – |
| Turnout | | 21,766 | 59.50 | -13.07 |
| Electors on the lists | | 36,584 | – | – |

2007 Quebec general election
| Party | Candidate | Votes | % | ±% |
|---|---|---|---|---|
| Action démocratique | Robert Deschamps | 9,788 | 37.72 | +5.58 |
| Parti Québécois | Claude Pinard | 8,494 | 32.73 | −1.99 |
| Liberal | France Beaulieu | 6,487 | 25.00 | −7.26 |
| Québec solidaire | Marianne Mathis | 796 | 3.07 | +2.19* |
| Independent | Francis Mondou | 387 | 1.49 | – |
| Total valid votes | | 25,952 | 98.54 | – |
| Total rejected ballots | | 385 | 1.46 | – |
| Turnout | | 26,337 | 72.57 | −0.10 |
| Electors on the lists | | 36,292 | – | – |

* Result compared to UFP

2003 Quebec general election
| Party | Candidate | Votes | % |
|---|---|---|---|
| Parti Québécois | Claude Pinard | 8,860 | 41.41 |
| Liberal | Bob Vallieres | 8,232 | 38.34 |
| Action démocratique | Luc Arvisais | 8,201 | 14.81 |
| UFP | Kevin Trudel | 225 | 0.88 |
| Total valid votes | | 25,518 | 98.11 |
| Total rejected ballots | | 491 | 1.89 |
| Turnout | | 26,009 | 72.67 |
| Electors on the lists | | 35,793 | – |

1998 Quebec general election
| Party | Candidate | Votes | % |
|---|---|---|---|
| Parti Québécois | Claude Pinard | 13,947 | 49.52 |
| Liberal | Serge Aubry | 10,219 | 36.28 |
| Action démocratique | Jean Bouchard | 3,998 | 14.20 |
| Total valid votes | | 28,164 | 98.01 |
| Total rejected ballots | | 571 | 1.99 |
| Turnout | | 28,735 | 80.68 |
| Electors on the lists | | 35,616 | – |

1995 Quebec referendum
| Side | Votes | % |
|---|---|---|
| Oui | 17,779 | 55.99 |
| Non | 13,973 | 44.01 |

1994 Quebec general election
| Party | Candidate | Votes | % |
|---|---|---|---|
| Parti Québécois | Claude Pinard | 13,202 | 47.38 |
| Liberal | Yvon Lemire | 11,065 | 39.71 |
| Action démocratique | Louise Trudel | 3,106 | 11.15 |
| Natural Law | Bruno Paquet | 238 | 0.85 |
| Independent | Pierre Bédard | 140 | 0.50 |
| Independent | Pierre Blais | 114 | 0.41 |
| Total valid votes | | 27,865 | 97.91 |
| Total rejected ballots | | 595 | 2.09 |
| Turnout | | 28,460 | 84.25 |
| Electors on the lists | | 33,780 | – |

1992 Charlottetown Accord referendum
| Side | Votes | % |
|---|---|---|
| Non | 18,137 | 64.63 |
| Oui | 9,927 | 35.37 |

1989 Quebec general election
| Party | Candidate | Votes | % |
|---|---|---|---|
| Liberal | Yvon Lemire | 12,853 | 51.26 |
| Parti Québécois | Fabien Béchard | 10,414 | 41.54 |
| Green | François Boucher | 1,805 | 7.20 |
| Total valid votes | | 25,072 | 96.08 |
| Total rejected ballots | | 1,023 | 3.92 |
| Turnout | | 26,095 | 76.64 |
| Electors on the lists | | 34,047 | – |

1985 Quebec general election
| Party | Candidate | Votes | % |
|---|---|---|---|
| Liberal | Yvon Lemire | 14,802 | 54.71 |
| Parti Québécois | Raymond Roy | 11,262 | 41.62 |
| Independent | Pierre Blais | 994 | 3.67 |
| Total valid votes | | 27,058 | 97.59 |
| Total rejected ballots | | 668 | 2.41 |
| Turnout | | 27,726 | 79.91 |
| Electors on the lists | | 34,698 | – |

1981 Quebec general election
| Party | Candidate | Votes | % |
|---|---|---|---|
| Parti Québécois | Yves Duhaime | 15,989 | 55.64 |
| Liberal | Yvon Lemire | 11,126 | 38.71 |
| Union Nationale | Paul Nollet | 1,505 | 5.24 |
| Independent | Denis Deschênes | 79 | 0.27 |
| Marxist–Leninist | Ginette Cardinal | 39 | 0.14 |
| Total valid votes | | 28,738 | 98.88 |
| Total rejected ballots | | 326 | 1.12 |
| Turnout | | 29,064 | 84.70 |
| Electors on the lists | | 34,316 | – |

1980 Quebec referendum
| Side | Votes | % |
|---|---|---|
| Non | 15,408 | 54.37 |
| Oui | 12,929 | 45.63 |

1976 Quebec general election
| Party | Candidate | Votes | % |
|---|---|---|---|
| Parti Québécois | Yves Duhaime | 12,836 | 45.77 |
| Liberal | Marcel Bérard | 8,048 | 28.70 |
| Union Nationale | Robert Leclerc | 4,749 | 16.94 |
| Ralliement créditiste | Roger Bélisle | 2,005 | 7.15 |
| Parti national populaire | Pierre-Paul Prud'homme | 405 | 1.44 |
| Total valid votes | | 28,043 | 98.11 |
| Total rejected ballots | | 540 | 1.89 |
| Turnout | | 28,583 | 88.64 |
| Electors on the lists | | 32,246 | – |

1973 Quebec general election
| Party | Candidate | Votes | % |
|---|---|---|---|
| Liberal | Marcel Bérard | 8,865 | 34.12 |
| Parti Québécois | Yves Duhaime | 7,451 | 28.68 |
| Union Nationale | Philippe Demers | 7,433 | 28.61 |
| Ralliement créditiste | Guy Germain | 2,230 | 8.59 |
| Total valid votes | | 25,979 | 98.67 |
| Total rejected ballots | | 351 | 1.33 |
| Turnout | | 26,330 | 85.28 |
| Electors on the lists | | 30,873 | – |

1970 Quebec general election
| Party | Candidate | Votes | % |
|---|---|---|---|
| Union Nationale | Philippe Demers | 11,921 | 36.93 |
| Parti Québécois | Yves Duhaime | 7,876 | 24.40 |
| Liberal | Gérard Dufresne | 7,857 | 24.34 |
| Ralliement créditiste | Gérard Lamy | 4,625 | 14.33 |
| Total valid votes | | 32,279 | 98.72 |
| Total rejected ballots | | 419 | 1.28 |
| Turnout | | 32,698 | 85.86 |
| Electors on the lists | | 38,085 | – |

1966 Quebec general election
| Party | Candidate | Votes | % |
|---|---|---|---|
| Union Nationale | Philippe Demers | 14,133 | 47.42 |
| Liberal | Jean-Guy Trépanier | 12,413 | 41.65 |
| RIN | Georges-Henri Cossette | 3,256 | 10.93 |
| Total valid votes | | 29,802 | 98.76 |
| Total rejected ballots | | 373 | 1.24 |
| Turnout | | 30,175 | 81.83 |
| Electors on the lists | | 36,874 | – |

Quebec provincial by-election, 1965
| Party | Candidate | Votes | % |
|---|---|---|---|
| Liberal | Jean-Guy Trépanier | 14,723 | 84.99 |
| Independent | Bernard Ducharme | 2,424 | 13.99 |
| Independent Social Credit | Henri Paquet | 177 | 1.02 |
| Total valid votes | | 17,324 | 98.25 |
| Total rejected ballots | | 308 | 1.75 |
| Turnout | | 17,632 | 49.00 |
| Electors on the lists | | 35,987 | – |

1962 Quebec general election
| Party | Candidate | Votes | % |
|---|---|---|---|
| Liberal | René Hamel | 15,684 | 55.73 |
| Union Nationale | Philippe Demers | 12,460 | 44.27 |
| Total valid votes | | 28,144 | 98.99 |
| Total rejected ballots | | 286 | 1.01 |
| Turnout | | 28,430 | 88.19 |
| Electors on the lists | | 32,238 | – |

1960 Quebec general election
| Party | Candidate | Votes | % |
|---|---|---|---|
| Liberal | René Hamel | 15,040 | 53.12 |
| Union Nationale | Gaston Hardy | 13,273 | 46.88 |
| Total valid votes | | 28,313 | 99.00 |
| Total rejected ballots | | 285 | 1.00 |
| Turnout | | 28,598 | 91.02 |
| Electors on the lists | | 31,420 | – |

1956 Quebec general election
| Party | Candidate | Votes | % |
|---|---|---|---|
| Liberal | René Hamel | 13,851 | 51.37 |
| Union Nationale | Gaston Hardy | 13,110 | 48.63 |
| Total valid votes | | 26,961 | 98.54 |
| Total rejected ballots | | 400 | 1.46 |
| Turnout | | 27,361 | 90.44 |
| Electors on the lists | | 30,254 | – |

1952 Quebec general election
| Party | Candidate | Votes | % |
|---|---|---|---|
| Liberal | René Hamel | 14,489 | 57.91 |
| Union Nationale | Marc Trudel | 10,529 | 42.09 |
| Total valid votes | | 25,018 | 98.74 |
| Total rejected ballots | | 318 | 1.26 |
| Turnout | | 25,336 | 87.70 |
| Electors on the lists | | 28,890 | – |

1948 Quebec general election
| Party | Candidate | Votes | % |
|---|---|---|---|
| Union Nationale | Marc Trudel | 11,830 | 53.40 |
| Union des électeurs | Joseph-Ernest Grégoire | 6,339 | 28.62 |
| Liberal | Joseph-Wilfrid Vincent | 3,983 | 17.98 |
| Total valid votes | | 22,152 | 98.40 |
| Total rejected ballots | | 360 | 1.60 |
| Turnout | | 22,512 | 84.98 |
| Electors on the lists | | 26,491 | – |

1944 Quebec general election
| Party | Candidate | Votes | % |
|---|---|---|---|
| Union Nationale | Marc Trudel | 9,933 | 51.86 |
| Bloc populaire | René Hamel | 4,714 | 24.61 |
| Liberal | Joseph-Adolphe Richard | 4,317 | 22.54 |
| Co-operative Commonwealth | Victor Bourassa | 189 | 28.62 |
| Total valid votes | | 22,152 | 98.40 |
| Total rejected ballots | | 360 | 1.60 |
| Turnout | | 22,512 | 84.98 |
| Electors on the lists | | 26,491 | – |

1939 Quebec general election
| Party | Candidate | Votes | % |
|---|---|---|---|
| Liberal | Polydore Beaulac | 3,462 | 46.54 |
| Union Nationale | Marc Trudel | 3,328 | 44.74 |
| Action libérale nationale | J. Alphonse Lamy | 648 | 8.71 |
| Total valid votes | | 22,152 | 98.40 |
| Total rejected ballots | | 360 | 1.60 |
| Turnout | | 22,512 | 84.98 |
| Electors on the lists | | 26,491 | – |

1936 Quebec general election
| Party | Candidate | Votes | % |
|---|---|---|---|
| Union Nationale | Marc Trudel | 4,635 | 65.19 |
| Liberal | Polydore Beaulac | 2,475 | 34.81 |
| Total valid votes | | 7,110 | 99.55 |
| Total rejected ballots | | 32 | 0.45 |
| Turnout | | 7,142 | 82.07 |
| Electors on the lists | | 26,491 | – |

1935 Quebec general election
| Party | Candidate | Votes | % |
|---|---|---|---|
| Action libérale nationale | Marc Trudel | 4,219 | 59.72 |
| Liberal | Joseph-Auguste Frigon | 2,846 | 40.28 |
| Total valid votes | | 7,065 | 99.72 |
| Total rejected ballots | | 20 | 0.18 |
| Turnout | | 7,085 | 82.05 |
| Electors on the lists | | 8,635 | – |

1931 Quebec general election
| Party | Candidate | Votes | % |
|---|---|---|---|
| Liberal | Joseph-Auguste Frigon | 3,571 | 57.36 |
| Conservative | Georges-Émile Ladouceur | 2,655 | 42.64 |
| Total valid votes | | 6,226 | 99.76 |
| Total rejected ballots | | 15 | 0.24 |
| Turnout | | 6,241 | 82.38 |
| Electors on the lists | | 7,576 | – |

1927 Quebec general election
| Party | Candidate | Votes | % |
|---|---|---|---|
| Liberal | Joseph-Auguste Frigon | 2,950 | 54.62 |
| Liberal | Alphonse-Edgar Guillemette | 2,451 | 45.38 |
| Total valid votes | | 5,401 | 99.61 |
| Total rejected ballots | | 21 | 0.39 |
| Turnout | | 5,422 | 69.90 |
| Electors on the lists | | 7,757 | – |

Quebec provincial by-election, 1924
| Party | Candidate | Votes | % |
|---|---|---|---|
| Liberal | Alphonse-Edgar Guillemette | 2,950 | 56.82 |
| Conservative | Georges-Émile Ladouceur | 2,242 | 43.18 |
| Total valid votes | | 5,192 | 99.14 |
| Total rejected ballots | | 45 | 0.86 |
| Turnout | | 5,237 | 77.46 |
| Electors on the lists | | 6,761 | – |

1923 Quebec general election
| Party | Candidate | Votes | % |
|---|---|---|---|
| Liberal | Léonide-Nestor-Arthur Ricard | 2,727 | 58.61 |
| Conservative | Joseph-Alexis Dufresne | 1,926 | 41.39 |
| Total valid votes | | 4,653 | 99.40 |
| Total rejected ballots | | 28 | 0.60 |
| Turnout | | 4,681 | 68.79 |
| Electors on the lists | | 6,805 | – |

Quebec provincial by-election, 1920
| Party | Candidate | Votes | % |
|---|---|---|---|
| Liberal | Léonide-Nestor-Arthur Ricard | 2,324 | 50.81 |
| Liberal | Alphonse-Edgar Guillemette | 2,250 | 49.19 |
| Total valid votes | | 4,574 | 98.96 |
| Total rejected ballots | | 48 | 1.04 |
| Turnout | | 4,622 | 70.39 |
| Electors on the lists | | 6,566 | – |

1919 Quebec general election
| Party | Candidate | Votes | % |
|---|---|---|---|
| Liberal | Georges-Isidore Delisle | 2,608 | 60.31 |
| Independent | J.-Hubert Biermans | 1,716 | 39.69 |
| Total valid votes | | 4,324 | 98.83 |
| Total rejected ballots | | 51 | 1.17 |
| Turnout | | 4,375 | 67.17 |
| Electors on the lists | | 6,513 | – |

1916 Quebec general election
| Party | Candidate | Votes | |
|---|---|---|---|
| Liberal | Georges-Isidore Delisle | Acclaimed | |
| Electors on the lists | | 5,407 | – |

1912 Quebec general election
| Party | Candidate | Votes | % |
|---|---|---|---|
| Liberal | Georges-Isidore Delisle | 2,088 | 52.97 |
| Conservative | Joseph-Alexis Dufresne | 1,854 | 47.03 |
| Total valid votes | | 3,942 | 98.70 |
| Total rejected ballots | | 52 | 1.30 |
| Turnout | | 3,994 | 76.85 |
| Electors on the lists | | 5,197 | – |

1908 Quebec general election
| Party | Candidate | Votes | % |
|---|---|---|---|
| Liberal | Georges-Isidore Delisle | 1,826 | 51.89 |
| Conservative | Joseph-Alexis Dufresne | 1,693 | 48.11 |
| Total valid votes | | 3,519 | 99.24 |
| Total rejected ballots | | 27 | 0.76 |
| Turnout | | 3,546 | 73.07 |
| Electors on the lists | | 4,853 | – |

1904 Quebec general election
| Party | Candidate | Votes | |
|---|---|---|---|
| Liberal | Louis-Philippe Fiset | Acclaimed | |
| Electors on the lists | | 4,100 | – |

1900 Quebec general election
| Party | Candidate | Votes | % |
|---|---|---|---|
| Liberal | Louis-Philippe Fiset | 1,436 | 53.46 |
| Conservative | Nérée Le Noblet Duplessis | 1,250 | 46.54 |
| Total valid votes | | 2,686 | 99.52 |
| Total rejected ballots | | 13 | 0.48 |
| Turnout | | 2,699 | 78.39 |
| Electors on the lists | | 3,443 | – |

1897 Quebec general election
| Party | Candidate | Votes | |
|---|---|---|---|
| Conservative | Nérée Le Noblet Duplessis | Acclaimed | |
| Electors on the lists | | 3,078 | – |

1892 Quebec general election
| Party | Candidate | Votes | |
|---|---|---|---|
| Conservative | Nérée Le Noblet Duplessis | Acclaimed | |
| Electors on the lists | | 2,618 | – |

1890 Quebec general election
| Party | Candidate | Votes | |
|---|---|---|---|
| Conservative | Nérée Le Noblet Duplessis | Acclaimed | |
| Electors on the lists | | 2,312 | – |

1886 Quebec general election
| Party | Candidate | Votes | % |
|---|---|---|---|
| Conservative | Nérée Le Noblet Duplessis | 909 | 56.85 |
| Conservative | Louis A. Philippe Lord | 690 | 43.15 |
| Total valid votes | | 1,599 | 99.19 |
| Total rejected ballots | | 13 | 0.81 |
| Turnout | | 1,612 | 77.43 |
| Electors on the lists | | 2,082 | – |

1881 Quebec general election
| Party | Candidate | Votes | % |
|---|---|---|---|
| Conservative | François-Sévère Lesieur Desaulniers | 801 | 53.69 |
| Liberal | S.J. Remington | 691 | 46.31 |
| Total valid votes | | 1,492 | 99.07 |
| Total rejected ballots | | 14 | 0.93 |
| Turnout | | 1,506 | 75.22 |
| Electors on the lists | | 2,002 | – |

1878 Quebec general election
| Party | Candidate | Votes | % |
|---|---|---|---|
| Conservative | François-Sévère Lesieur Desaulniers | 761 | 59.13 |
| Conservative | Louis A. Philippe Lord | 526 | 40.87 |
| Total valid votes | | 1,287 | 99.54 |
| Total rejected ballots | | 6 | 0.46 |
| Turnout | | 1,293 | 69.26 |
| Electors on the lists | | 1,867 | – |

1875 Quebec general election
| Party | Candidate | Votes | % |
|---|---|---|---|
| Conservative | Élie Lacerte | 657 | 52.27 |
| Liberal | François-Dechêne Fontaine | 401 | 31.90 |
| Conservative | A.-Adolphe Lamy | 199 | 15.83 |
| Total valid votes | | 1,257 | 98.51 |
| Total rejected ballots | | 19 | 1.49 |
| Turnout | | 1,276 | 74.62 |
| Electors on the lists | | 1,710 | – |

1871 Quebec general election
| Party | Candidate | Votes | % |
|---|---|---|---|
| Conservative | Elzéar Gérin | 675 | 55.92 |
| Liberal | François X. Bellemare | 532 | 44.08 |
| Total valid votes | | 1,207 | 100.00 |
| Turnout | | 1,012 | 74.23 |
| Electors on the lists | | 1,626 | – |

1867 Quebec general election
| Party | Candidate | Votes | % |
|---|---|---|---|
| Conservative | Abraham Lesieur Desaulniers | 678 | 67.00 |
| Liberal | François-Dechêne Fontaine | 334 | 33.00 |
| Total valid votes | | 1,012 | 100.00 |
| Turnout | | 1,012 | 61.04 |
| Electors on the lists | | 1,658 | – |

== See also ==
- District of Saint-Maurice (Lower Canada)
- District of Saint-Maurice (Province of Canada)
- History of Canada
- History of Quebec
- Mauricie
- Politics of Canada
- Politics of Quebec
- Saint-Maurice Federal Electoral District
- Saint-Maurice—Champlain
