= Marcel Bérard =

Canadian politician (1933–2021)

Marcel Bérard (14 February 1933 – 11 November 2021) was a politician in the Quebec, Canada. He served as Member of the Legislative Assembly.

== Life and career ==
Bérard was born in Shawinigan-Sud, Mauricie on 14 February 1933. He initially worked as an educator.

He ran as a Liberal candidate to the National Assembly of Quebec in the district of Saint-Maurice in 1973 and defeated Union Nationale incumbent Philippe Demers. In 1976 though, he ran again and lost against Parti Québécois candidate Yves Duhaime.

Bérard died on 11 November 2021, at the age of 88.

National Assembly of Quebec
Preceded by Philippe Demers (Union Nationale)	MNA, District of Saint-Maurice; 1973–1976	Succeeded by Yves Duhaime (PQ)
