= Fiset =

Fiset (French pronunciation: [fi.ze]) is a French surname. Notable people with this surname include:

- Eugène Fiset (1874–1951), Canadian physician, military officer and politician
- Jean-Baptiste Romuald Fiset (1843–1917), Canadian physician and politician
- Louis-Philippe Fiset (1854–1934), Canadian physician and politician
- Paul Fiset (1922–2001), Canadian-American microbiologist and virologist
- Stéphane Fiset (born 1970), Canadian ice hockey player
