= Aurèle Lacombe =

Canadian politician

Member of the Legislative Assembly of Quebec for Montréal-Dorion
- In office 1919–1923
- Preceded by: Georges Mayrand
- Succeeded by: Ernest Tétreau

Personal details
- Born: January 28, 1887 Sainte-Scholastique (Mirabel), Quebec
- Died: March 6, 1963 (aged 76) Montreal, Quebec
- Party: Labour

Aurèle Lacombe (January 28, 1887 – March 6, 1963) was a politician Quebec, Canada and a Member of the Legislative Assembly of Quebec (MLA).

== Early life ==
He was born on January 28, 1887, in Sainte-Scholastique, Laurentides (now part of Mirabel, Quebec). He was a union activist.

== Political career ==
He ran as a Labour candidate in the district of Montréal-Dorion in the 1919 provincial election and won against Liberal incumbent Georges Mayrand. Lacombe kept the Labor label, but was appointed Minister without Portfolio in Alexandre Taschereau's Cabinet on September 27, 1921.

He finished second in the 1923 election and was defeated by Independent Liberal candidate Ernest Tétreau.
