= Philippe Demers =

Canadian veterinarian and politician (1919-1999)

Member of the National Assembly of Quebec for Saint-Maurice
- In office 1966–1973
- Preceded by: Jean-Guy Trépanier
- Succeeded by: Marcel Bérard

Personal details
- Born: April 28, 1919 Saint-Sébastien, Quebec
- Died: March 4, 1999 (aged 79) Charlesbourg, Quebec
- Party: Union Nationale

Philippe Demers (April 28, 1919 – March 4, 1999) was a veterinarian and a politician in Quebec, Canada. He served as member of the Legislative Assembly of Quebec.

== Early life and career ==
He was born in 1919 in Saint-Sébastien, Montérégie. He practiced as a veterinarian in Shawinigan-Sud, Mauricie.

== Municipal politics ==
He served as city councillor from 1953 to 1957 and as mayor of Shawinigan-Sud from 1957 to 1962.

== Provincial politics ==
He successfully ran as the Union Nationale candidate in the provincial district of Saint-Maurice in the 1966 general election to the Legislative Assembly of Quebec, defeating the liberal incumbent Jean-Guy Trépanier. Demers was re-elected to the National Assembly of Quebec in the 1970 general election.

In 1973, Demers lost re-election against the liberal candidate Marcel Bérard, finishing a close third behind Bérard and Parti Québécois candidate Yves Duhaime.

== Federal politics ==
Demers ran as a Progressive Conservative candidate in the district of Champlain in 1980. He finished third, behind Liberal incumbent Michel Veillette and NDP candidate René Matte.

== After retirement from politics ==
He died in Charlesbourg in 1999.

Political offices
Preceded by Bruno Sigmen	Mayor of Shawinigan-Sud; 1957–1962	Succeeded by Bruno Sigmen
