= Robert Deschamps =

Canadian politician (born 1940)

MNA for Saint-Maurice
- In office April 25, 2007 – November 5, 2008
- Preceded by: Claude Pinard
- Succeeded by: Claude Pinard

Personal details
- Born: January 6, 1940 (age 86)
- Party: Action démocratique du Québec
- Spouse: Diane Gauthier

Robert "Bob" Deschamps (born January 6, 1940) is a politician from Quebec, Canada. He was an Action démocratique du Québec Member of the National Assembly for the electoral district of Saint-Maurice from 2007 to 2008.

Deschamps, who has a background in education, was a teacher for 24 years after obtaining a degree at the Université de Montréal and completing additional studies at St. Dunstan's University in Charlottetown, Prince Edward Island, where he played for the university's hockey club. He was also a director for a Montreal mining exploration company for eight years. He was also a manager and football coach in the league he founded in 1965, the Ligue de football interscolaire de Mauricie, and was involved heavily in many canoe associations regionally and provincially.

He had been a long-life supporter of the sovereignty of Quebec and was a Parti Québécois supporter and member for nearly 40 years. He unsuccessfully ran three times as a New Democratic Party candidate. His first attempt was at the provincial level in the district of Laviolette in 1976. He also ran at the federal level in the district of Saint-Maurice against Liberal Jean Chrétien in 1979 and 1993.

He was elected to the National Assembly in 2007 with 38% of the vote. Parti Québécois incumbent Claude Pinard, who was running for a fourth consecutive term, finished second with 33% of the vote. Deschamps took office on April 12, 2007.

In the minutes that followed his inauguration, Deschamps confirmed his intention to relocate the Aréna Jacques Plante away from the downtown area, near the École Secondaire des Chutes. Deschamps's position clearly contrasts from that of the Shawinigan city government. Mayor Lise Landry and a number of city councillors want to relocate the facility between the city's two main districts: Downtown Shawinigan and Shawinigan-Sud.

Deschamps was defeated in the 2008 election. He ran as an independent candidate in the district of Trois-Rivières in the 2012 election and was defeated.

== Local Politics ==
In 2009, Robert Deschamps ran for Mayor in Shawinigan, but later dropped from the race for health reasons.

== Electoral record ==
2007 Quebec general election: Saint-Maurice
Party	Candidate	Votes	%	±%
Action démocratique	Robert Deschamps	9,788	37.72	+5.58
Parti Québécois	Claude Pinard	8,494	32.73	−1.99
Liberal	France Beaulieu	6,487	25.00	−7.26
Québec solidaire	Marianne Mathis	796	3.07	+2.19*
Independent	Francis Mondou	387	1.49	–
Total valid votes		25,952	98.54	–
Total rejected ballots		385	1.46	–
Turnout		26,337	72.57	−0.10
Electors on the lists		36,292	–	–

* Result compared to UFP
