= Beaulac =

Beaulac may refer to:

== Family name ==
- Polydore Beaulac was a politician in the Quebec, Canada. He served as Member of the Legislative Assembly.
- Willard L. Beaulac (1899–1990) was a United States Diplomat. He served as U.S. Ambassador to Paraguay, Colombia, Cuba, Chile and Argentina.

== Place ==
=== Canada ===
- Beaulac-Garthby is a municipality in the province of Quebec.

=== Egypt ===
- Bulaq, alternatively spelt Beaulac, is a district of Cairo.

=== France ===
- Bernos-Beaulac is a commune in the Gironde department in Aquitaine in southwestern France.
