= Pierre Giguère =

Canadian politician

Member of the National Assembly of Quebec for Saint-Maurice
- In office April 7, 2014 – October 1, 2018
- Preceded by: Luc Trudel
- Succeeded by: Riding abolished

Personal details
- Party: Quebec Liberal Party; CAQ (formerly)

Pierre Giguère is a Canadian politician in Quebec, who was elected to the National Assembly of Quebec in the 2014 election. He represents the electoral district of Saint-Maurice as a member of the Quebec Liberal Party.

Prior to his election to the legislature, he was a city councillor in Shawinigan. He ran in the 2012 election as a candidate of the Coalition Avenir Québec, but rejoined the Liberals in February 2014.
