= Claude Pinard =

Canadian politician (born 1949)

MNA for Saint-Maurice
- In office September 12, 1994 – March 26, 2007
- Preceded by: Yvon Lemire
- Succeeded by: Robert Deschamps
- In office December 8, 2008 – September 4, 2012
- Preceded by: Robert Deschamps
- Succeeded by: Luc Trudel

Personal details
- Born: June 15, 1949 (age 76) Shawinigan-Sud, Quebec
- Party: Parti Québécois

Claude Pinard (born June 15, 1949) is a politician in Quebec, Canada. He serves as Member of the National Assembly of Quebec for the riding of Saint-Maurice in the Mauricie region from 1994 to 2007 and since the 2008 provincial elections.

== Background ==
He was born on June 15, 1949, in Shawinigan-Sud. Pinard graduated from the Séminaire Sainte-Marie of Shawinigan in 1968, studied law at Université Laval and became a notary in 1974. He served as president of the local branch of Optimist International and president of the Shawinigan Cataractes in the 1980s.

== Municipal politics ==
He was elected Mayor of Shawinigan-Sud in 1985 and served of four-year term in that office. He did not run for re-election in 1989.

== Provincial politics ==
Pinard ran as the Parti Québécois candidate in the district of Saint-Maurice in the 1994, 1998 and 2003 elections. He was elected each time.

Pinard was Deputy Speaker of the House from 1996 to 2002.

In 2005 he supported leadership candidate Richard Legendre over André Boisclair.

In 2007, the Action démocratique du Québec (ADQ) made an important breakthrough in the Mauricie area sweeping most provincial seats in that area. ADQ candidate Robert "Bob" Deschamps won the election, keeping Pinard from winning a fourth straight term.

Nonetheless, Pinard won his seat back in the 2008 election.

== See also ==
- Mauricie
- Saint-Maurice Legislators
- Saint-Maurice Provincial Electoral District
- Shawinigan, Quebec

Political offices
| Preceded by Gilles Grondin | Mayor of Shawinigan-Sud; 1985–1989 | Succeeded by Marcel Vézina |
