= Yvon Lemire =

Canadian politician

Yvon Lemire was a politician in Quebec, Canada. He served as Member of the Legislative Assembly of Quebec.

He was born in 1939 in Baie-de-Shawinigan, Mauricie.

== Provincial Politics ==
He ran as the Liberal candidate in the district of Saint-Maurice in 1981, but lost against incumbent Yves Duhaime.

He ran again in 1985 and 1989 and won each time.

In 1994, he was defeated by Claude Pinard.

== See also ==
- Mauricie
- Saint-Maurice Legislators
- Saint-Maurice Provincial Electoral District
- Shawinigan, Quebec

National Assembly of Quebec
| Preceded by Yves Duhaime (PQ) | MLA, District of Saint-Maurice; 1985–1994 | Succeeded by Claude Pinard (PQ) |
