= Denis Pronovost =

Canadian politician

Member of Parliament for Saint-Maurice
- In office 1988–1993
- Preceded by: Gilles Grondin
- Succeeded by: Jean Chrétien

Personal details
- Born: 3 May 1953 (age 73) Grand-Mère, Quebec
- Party: Independent (since 1993); Progressive Conservative (until 1993)
- Profession: journalist, radio host

Denis Pronovost (born 3 May 1953) was a member of the House of Commons of Canada from 1988 to 1993.

== Early career ==
He was born in Grand-Mère, Quebec and was a local radio host and journalist.

== Federal politics ==
Pronovost ran as a Progressive Conservative candidate in the district of Saint-Maurice in 1988 and was elected. He was the first member of his party to be sent to the House of Commons by voters of that district in decades.

== Political downfall ==
He served in the 34th Canadian Parliament, but was charged and convicted regarding sexual assaults on young males. He left his party to sit as an independent on 17 June 1993 and did not run for re-election in 1993. He was later hired at Rogers Communications where as of October 2009 was let go as a result of the restructure of the company
