= Jean-Guy Trépanier =

Canadian politician

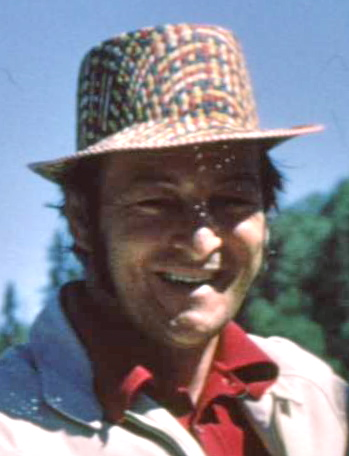
Jean-Guy Trépanier in 1975

Jean-Guy Trépanier (3 February 1932 – 30 March 2018) was a politician in Quebec, Canada. He served as Member of the Legislative Assembly.

== Early life ==
He was born on February 3, 1932, in Shawinigan, Mauricie and was a notary.

== Political career ==
Trépanier won a by-election as a Liberal candidate to the Legislative Assembly of Quebec in the district of Saint-Maurice in 1965. He was succeeding Judge René Hamel who had recently resigned.

In 1966 though, he lost against Union Nationale candidate Philippe Demers.

== Footnotes ==
National Assembly of Quebec
Preceded by René Hamel (Liberal)	MLA, District of Saint-Maurice; 1965–1966	Succeeded by Philippe Demers (Union Nationale)
