= Alphonse-Edgar Guillemette =

Canadian politician

Alphonse-Edgar Guillemette (25 June 1877 – 23 August 1950) was a politician in Quebec, Canada. He served as Member of the Legislative Assembly.

== Early life ==
Guillemette was born in Princeville, Centre-du-Québec, the son of Ludger Guillemette, a merchant, and his wife Anabella Provencher. He took up residence at Shawinigan in 1899, working first as a baker, and later as a trader in grains and feed.

Guillemette served as a Shawinigan alderman in 1901–1902, and again in 1909–1914. He served as warden of the Saint-Pierre parish 1917–1920. In 1920 he ran in the by-election in the Saint-Maurice district on the Liberal ticket, but was not elected. He ran again in 1924, and was successful. However, he was defeated by another Liberal, Joseph-Auguste Frigon, in the 1927 general election.

He was named Provincial Revenue Collector for the Shawinigan District in 1929, and Director of the Bureau of Motor Vehicles for Quebec in Shawinigan. He also worked as a real-estate agent during those years. He was a member of the Shawinigan Chamber of Commerce, the Knights of Columbus, and the Northern Club.

He married Éda Trudel, daughter of Philippe Trudel, a Deputy Registrar, and Séphora Saint-Arnaud, on 19 May 1906. He was a brother-in-law to Marc Trudel.

He died in Shawinigan on 23 August 1950, aged 73. He was buried in the Saint-Joseph Parish cemetery on 26 August.

National Assembly of Quebec
Preceded by Léonide-Nestor-Arthur Ricard (Liberal)	MLA, District of Saint-Maurice; 1924–1927	Succeeded by Joseph-Auguste Frigon (Liberal)
