= Gilles Grondin =

Canadian politician

Member of Parliament for Saint-Maurice
- In office June 29, 1986 – November 20, 1988
- Preceded by: Jean Chrétien
- Succeeded by: Denis Pronovost

Mayor of Shawinigan-Sud, Quebec
- In office 1977–1985
- Preceded by: Albert Landry
- Succeeded by: Claude Pinard

Personal details
- Born: 3 February 1943 Shawinigan-Sud, Quebec, Canada
- Died: 18 July 2005 (aged 62)
- Party: Liberal
- Spouse: Monique Bacon (m. 1966)

Gilles Grondin (3 February 1943 – 18 July 2005) was an educator and a politician from Quebec, Canada. He was a Member of the House of Commons of Canada from 1986 to 1988.

== Background ==
He was born in Shawinigan-Sud, Quebec. He attended Saint-Georges school and Séminaire Sainte-Marie, where he eventually worked as a librarian, and served as a dean of men at the local CEGEP. He received his Bachelor of Library Science (BScLib) from the Université de Montreal.

== Local politics ==
Grondin served as Mayor of Shawinigan-Sud from 1977 to 1985. He did not run for re-election in 1985 and was succeeded by Claude Pinard.

== Member of Parliament ==
On 29 September 1986, Grondin won a by-election and filled the seat left by Jean Chrétien, becoming the Liberal Member for the district of Saint-Maurice. Chrétien had left federal politics in February that year and would stay out of office until he became Liberal party leader and subsequently Prime Minister.

After serving in the remaining months of the 33rd Canadian Parliament, Grondin left federal politics and did not campaign in the 1988 federal election. He was succeeded by Denis Pronovost of the Progressive Conservative Party.

== Death ==
He died in 2005 after several years of dealing with cancer.
