= Marc Trudel =

Canadian politician (1896–1961)

Member of the Legislative Assembly of Quebec for Saint-Maurice
- In office 1935–1939
- Preceded by: Joseph-Auguste Frigon
- Succeeded by: Polydore Beaulac
- In office 1944–1952
- Preceded by: Polydore Beaulac
- Succeeded by: René Hamel

Personal details
- Born: March 29, 1896 Sainte-Geneviève-de-Batiscan, Quebec
- Died: September 10, 1961 (aged 65) Shawinigan, Quebec
- Party: Action libérale nationale Union Nationale

Marc Trudel (March 29, 1896 – September 10, 1961) was a politician in Quebec, Canada.

He served as Cabinet Member and Member of the Legislative Assembly of Quebec.

== Early life ==
He was born on March 29, 1896, in Sainte-Geneviève-de-Batiscan and moved to Shawinigan in 1923. Trudel was a physician. He married Alice Lambert on May 10, 1926.

== Member of the legislature ==
He ran as an Action libérale nationale candidate in 1935 and defeated incumbent Liberal MLA Joseph-Auguste Frigon. Trudel joined Maurice Duplessis and the Union Nationale when the party was established; he was re-elected in 1936.

Duplessis served one term as Premier. Before another election was called, World War II broke out. The conscription issue really hurt the Union Nationale's chances of re-election. Trudel and most of his colleagues were voted out in 1939.

== Member of the Cabinet ==
In 1944 though, the Union Nationale was sent back in office and Trudel defeated incumbent Polydore Beaulac. Duplessis appointed Trudel to the Cabinet as a Minister without Portfolio. The assignment consists more of an honour than an actual responsibility. Nonetheless it gave Trudel more prominence.

Trudel was re-elected in 1948. In 1952 however, he lost re-election against René Hamel.

== After Retirement from Politics ==
Trudel died in Shawinigan on September 10, 1961.

== Legacy ==
Place Trudel and Pont Trudel (Trudel Bridge) in Shawinigan-Sud were named to honour Doctor Marc Trudel.

== See also ==
- Mauricie
- Saint-Maurice Legislators
- Saint-Maurice Provincial Electoral District
- Shawinigan, Quebec
