= Abraham Lesieur Desaulniers =

Canadian politician

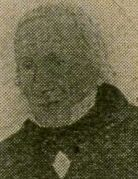

Member of the Legislative Assembly of Quebec for Saint-Maurice
- In office 1867–1871
- Succeeded by: Elzéar Gérin

Personal details
- Born: December 17, 1822 Yamachiche, Lower Canada
- Died: January 23, 1883 (aged 60) Trois-Rivières, Quebec
- Party: Conservative

Abraham Lesieur Desaulniers (December 17, 1822 – January 23, 1883) was a politician in the province of Quebec, Canada. He served as Member of the Legislative Assembly.

== Early life ==
He was born on December 17, 1822, in Yamachiche, Mauricie. He was an attorney.

== Municipal Politics ==
He was a Council member in Trois-Rivières in 1854.

== Provincial Politics ==
In 1867, Desaulniers, who was a Conservative, became the Member of the Legislative Assembly for the district of Saint-Maurice. He did not run for re-election in 1871.

== Death ==
He died on January 23, 1883.
