= Elzéar Gérin =

Canadian politician

Member of the Legislative Assembly of Quebec for Saint-Maurice
- In office 1871–1875
- Preceded by: Abraham Lesieur Desaulniers
- Succeeded by: Élie Lacerte

Member of the Legislative Council of Quebec for Kennebec
- In office 1871–1875
- Preceded by: Joseph Gaudet
- Succeeded by: Édouard-Louis Pacaud

Personal details
- Born: 14 November 1843 Yamachiche, Canada East
- Died: 18 August 1887 (aged 43) Montreal, Quebec
- Party: Conservative
- Parent: Antoine Gérin dit Lajoie and Amable Gélinas
- Profession: Lawyer

Elzéar Gérin (14 November 1843 – 18 August 1887) was a politician in Quebec, Canada.

Elzéar was born on in Yamachiche, Mauricie and was an attorney by vocation. He served as a member of the Legislative Assembly.

== Federal Politics ==
He ran as a Conservative candidate in an 1868 by-election in the district of Saint-Maurice, but lost against another Conservative Élie Lacerte.

== Provincial Politics ==
In 1871, Desaulniers became the Conservative Member of the Legislative Assembly for the district of Saint-Maurice. He did not run for re-election in 1875.

He was appointed to the Legislative Council of Quebec in 1882 and died in office.
