= Nérée Le Noblet Duplessis =

Canadian politician (1855–1926)

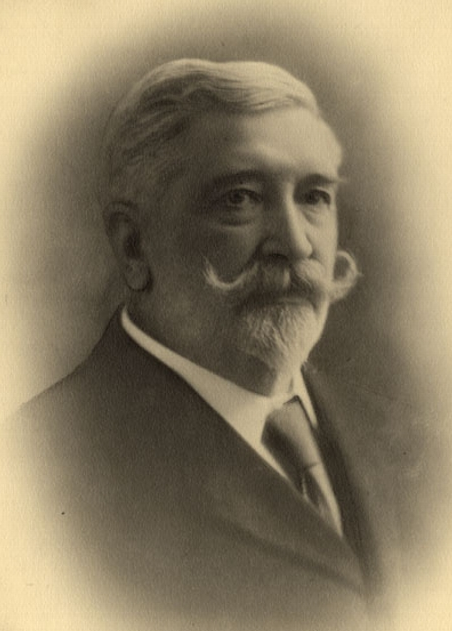

Member of the Legislative Assembly of Quebec for Saint-Maurice
- In office 1886–1900
- Preceded by: François-Sévère Lesieur Desaulniers
- Succeeded by: Louis-Philippe Fiset

19th Mayor of Trois-Rivières
- In office 1904–1905
- Preceded by: N.-L. Denoncourt
- Succeeded by: Louis-Docithé Paquin

Personal details
- Born: 5 March 1855 Yamachiche, Canada East
- Died: 23 June 1926 (aged 71) Montreal, Quebec
- Party: Conservative
- Children: Maurice Duplessis

Nérée Le Noblet Duplessis (French pronunciation: [neʁe lə nɔblɛ dyplɛsi]; 5 March 1855 – 23 June 1926) was a politician in the province of Quebec, Canada. He served as Mayor of Trois-Rivières and as Member of the Legislative Assembly. He was the father of Premier Maurice Duplessis.

== Early life ==
Duplessis was born in 1855 in Yamachiche, Mauricie, Canada East, the son of Marie-Louise (Lefebvre-Descôteaux) and Joseph Le Noblet Duplessis. He was an attorney.

== Provincial politics ==
In 1886, Duplessis, who was a Conservative, became the Member of the Legislative Assembly for the district of Saint-Maurice. He was succeeding law practice partner François-Sévère Lesieur Desaulniers, who was moving to federal politics.

Despite a landslide victory of Honoré Mercier's Parti National in 1890, he and his Conservative colleagues from the Mauricie area were re-elected. He was re-elected again in 1892 as the Conservative Party won a majority.

The Liberals won the 1896 federal election and the 1897 provincial election. They would dominate Quebec politics for decades. Duplessis temporarily survived the new political context, but was ultimately defeated by Liberal Louis-Philippe Fiset in 1900.

Under Duplessis's tenure, many Mauricie villages were established, including Saint-Jacques-des-Piles in 1885, Saint-Joseph-de-Mékinac in 1888 and Lac-à-la-Tortue in 1895.

== Municipal politics ==
Duplessis was Mayor of Trois-Rivières from 1904 to 1905.

== Later life ==
Duplessis was appointed judge in 1914. He died in Montreal in 1926.
