= Roche-Charles-la-Mayrand =

- Commune
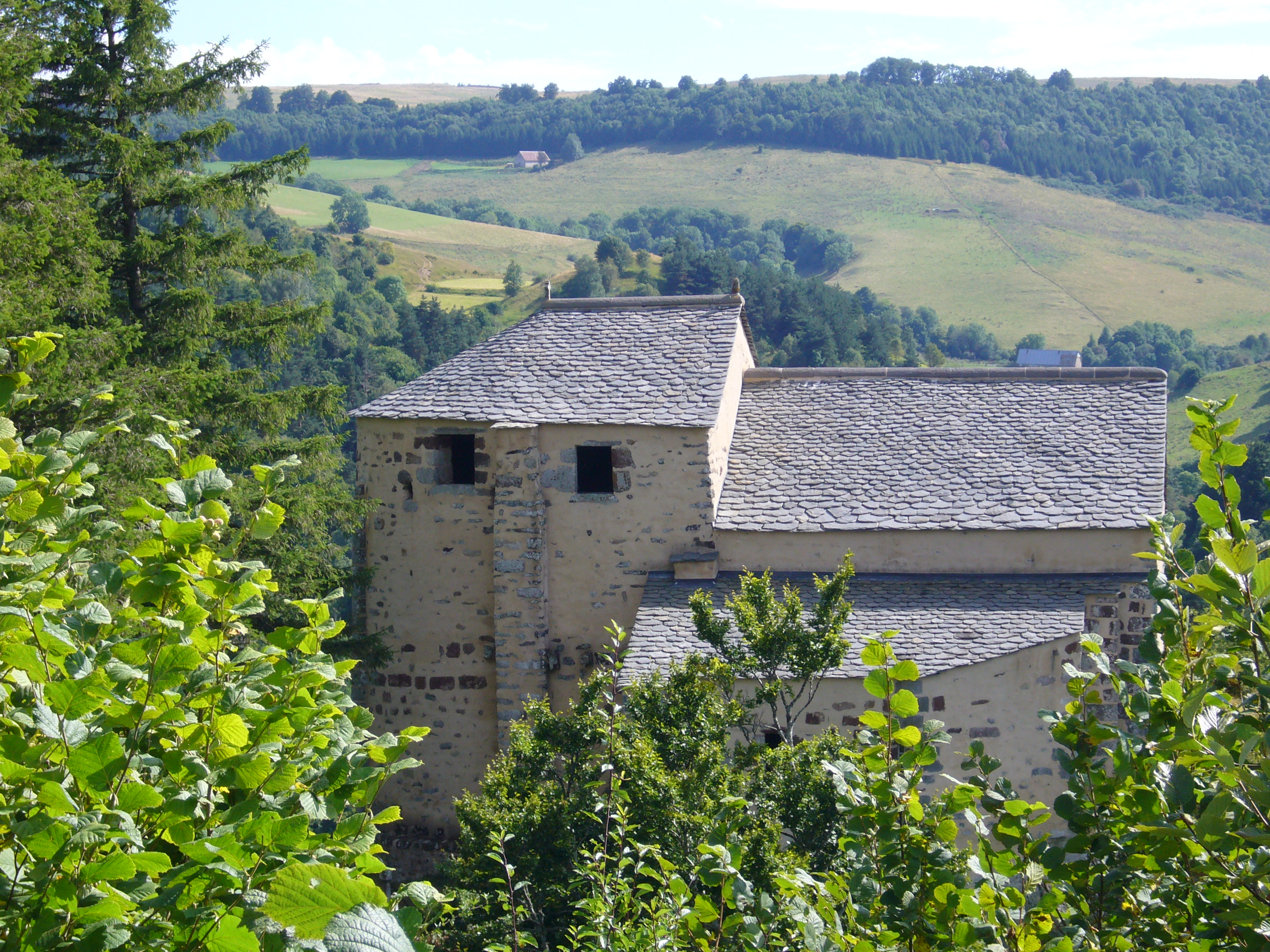
- The church in Roche-Charles-la-Mayrand
- Location of Roche-Charles-la-Mayrand
- Location within France Location within Auvergne-Rhône-Alpes
- Coordinates: 45°27′32″N 3°01′52″E
- Country: France
- Region: Auvergne-Rhône-Alpes
- Department: Puy-de-Dôme
- Arrondissement: Issoire
- Canton: Brassac-les-Mines
- Intercommunality: Agglo Pays d'Issoire

Government
  - Mayor (2026–32): Jean-Marc Gomez
- Area^{1}: 16.22 km^{2} (6.26 sq mi)
- Elevation: 900 m (3,000 ft)
- Highest elevation: 1,241 m (4,072 ft)
- Lowest elevation: 840 m (2,760 ft)
- Population (2023): 39
  - Density: 2.4/km^{2} (6.2/sq mi)
- Time zone: UTC+01:00 (CET)
  - Summer (DST): UTC+02:00 (CEST)
- INSEE/Postal code: 63303 /63420
- ^{1} French Land Register data, which excludes lakes, ponds, glaciers > 1 km^{2} (0.386 sq mi or 247 acres) and river estuaries.

Roche-Charles-la-Mayrand (French pronunciation: [ʁɔʃ ʃaʁl la meʁɑ̃]) is a commune in the Puy-de-Dôme department in Auvergne in central France.

== See also ==
- Communes of the Puy-de-Dôme department
