= Louis-Philippe Fiset =

Canadian politician

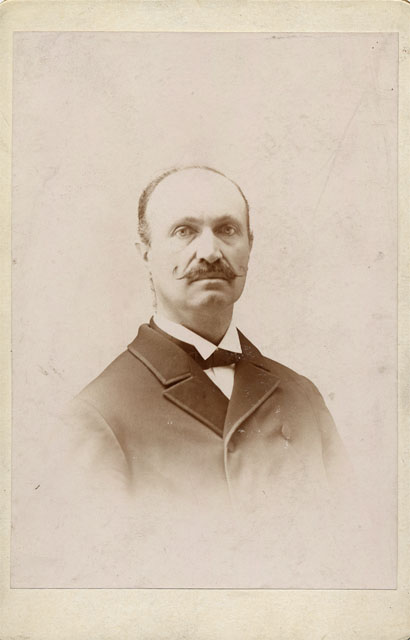
Louis-Philippe Fiset, ~1910

Louis-Philippe Fiset (11 January 1854 – 4 September 1934) was a local physician and politician in the Mauricie area. He served as Member of the Legislative Assembly from 1900 to 1908.

He was born in 1854 in Saint-Cuthbert, Quebec.

== Politics ==
He unsuccessfully ran as a Liberal candidate in the district of Trois-Rivières in 1896, and served as mayor of Saint-Boniface-de-Shawinigan from 1898 to 1900.

In 1900, Fiset became the Liberal Member of the Legislative Assembly for the district of Saint-Maurice. He was re-elected in 1904, but did not run for re-election 1908.

During his tenure, the city of Shawinigan was incorporated.

== After retirement ==
Fiset died in Montreal in 1934. Rue Fiset (Fiset Street) in Saint-Boniface-de-Shawinigan was named to honour him.

National Assembly of Quebec
Preceded by Nérée Le Noblet Duplessis (Conservative)	MLA, District of Saint-Maurice; 1900–1908	Succeeded by Georges-Isidore Delisle (Liberal)
