= Edward Mayrand =

American serial killer and rapist

- Born: Edward M. Mayrand, Jr. 1947; Northampton, Massachusetts, U.S.
- Died: 2011 (aged 63–64); Rhode Island, U.S.
- Conviction: Second degree murder
- Penalty: 35 to 60 years' imprisonment

Details
- Victims: 3
- Span of crimes: 1983–1994
- Country: United States
- States: Massachusetts; New Hampshire; Rhode Island
- Date apprehended: 1994

Edward M. Mayrand Jr. (1947–2011) was an American serial killer and rapist who strangled three women in New England between 1983 and 1994. Convicted of the 1994 murder of Patricia Paquette in Providence, Rhode Island, he died in prison from lung cancer before he could be charged with two other deaths in Massachusetts and New Hampshire, to which he was posthumously linked via DNA.

== Prior criminal history ==
A drifter who often changed residences, Mayrand's criminal record dated back to at least 1975, with convictions of rape, assault and illegal possession of firearms. In one notable case, he met a woman at a bar in Warwick, Rhode Island, and when she accepted a ride from him, he drove her to a remote area. There, he punched and choked the woman with her own scarf before driving her to a cemetery, where he raped her. Miraculously, she managed to escape, running naked through the woods until she reached a house and called for help. For this, Mayrand was arrested and imprisoned until the fall of 1983, when he was released on parole.

== Murders ==
=== Kathleen Daneault ===
Soon after his parole, on November 23, Mayrand met 25-year-old Kathleen Daneault at the Mahaki Restaurant in Gardner, Massachusetts. The two were last seen leaving the premises together. The following day, workers at the nearby S. Bent Furniture Factory found her body on a dirt path not far from the restaurant. She had been strangled with a piece of her own blouse, which had been ripped off. The following month, he was arrested for violating his parole and imprisoned until May 1986, when he was released again.

=== Judith Whitney ===
Following this, Mayrand, on conditions of his parole, moved to a halfway house in Northampton, Massachusetts, where he was required to attend Alcoholics Anonymous meetings. In June 1987, through one such meeting, he met 43-year-old Judith A. Whitney, of Amherst, a Kentucky-born divorcée with three daughters who sold firearms at a sporting center. The two got acquainted rather quickly, and the following month, she told her family that she was going on a camping trip with her new boyfriend in New Hampshire. The two were last seen together at the Valley Green Motel in Keene, with a chambermaid later testifying that she had seen Mayrand driving Whitney's 1980 Ford Mustang, although the couple never checked out and didn't return to collect their belongings.

In August, authorities searched an apartment in Peterborough, New Hampshire, belonging to locals Deardre Gladu and Sylvia Taylor. Surprisingly, they found Mayrand hiding in a closet, and swiftly arrested him, as he had violated his parole by leaving the halfway house back at Massachusetts. When questioned about Judith, Edward gave conflicting statements, claiming to have last seen her in the motel, when she got upset and left because Mayrand was seen dancing and talking to other women. He admitted to giving away Whitney's necklace and watch to Gladu and Taylor, as well as being in possession of Judith's gun and the Ford Mustang for about a week, before he abandoned it in Fitzwilliam. Despite this, authorities determined there wasn't enough evidence to charge him with murder, and instead jailed him for violating his parole. On November 8, a hunter discovered Whitney's skeletal remains buried in a shallow grave off Route 119, in Winchester, New Hampshire. Like Daneault, it appeared that she was strangled with pieces of her own clothing, but in Judith's case, the killer also tied a drawstring from her raincoat around her neck.

=== Patricia Paquette ===
Mayrand was released yet again in October 1988, but the following year was arrested for possessing a weapon, which felons are prohibited from doing. He was jailed for two-and-a-half years in the New Hampshire State Prison for Men in Concord, where he hinted at his two murders to other inmates, but it wasn't enough to charge him. After his release, he moved out of state to a house in Providence, Rhode Island. In 1994, he met 46-year-old Patricia Paquette at a drinking lounge, and the couple were last seen together. On December 21, Paquette's dismembered remains were found stuffed in several plastic garbage bags, in an abandoned building just around the corner where Mayrand was residing. She had been strangled to death prior to the dismemberment.

== Arrest, imprisonment and death ==
Edward Mayrand remained on the run until February 1995, when he was arrested in New Haven, Connecticut. He was extradited back to Rhode Island, where he was convicted of the second-degree murder of Paquette and sentenced to 35–60 years' imprisonment. Daneault's and Whitney's murders remained cold cases until 2010, when the New Hampshire Cold Case Unit, assisted by the Massachusetts State Police and the Worcester District Attorney's Office, announced that they were officially reinvestigating both of them. In June 2011, as they were preparing search warrants to obtain a DNA sample from Mayrand, they learned that he was gravely ill. Seizing the opportunity, they obtained a sample, and in September 2014, they finally managed to link him to the killings. However, by this time, Edward Mayrand couldn't be charged, since he had died from metastatic lung cancer in a Rhode Island prison in 2011.

== See also ==
- List of serial killers in the United States
