= Polydore Beaulac =

Canadian politician (1893–1981)

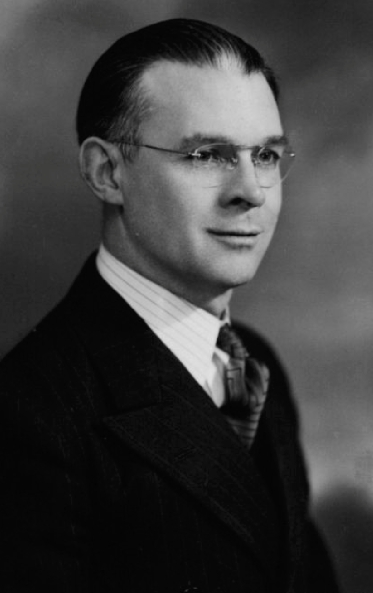

Member of the Legislative Assembly of Quebec for Saint-Maurice
- In office 1939–1944
- Preceded by: Marc Trudel
- Succeeded by: Marc Trudel

Personal details
- Born: July 8, 1893 Chicago, Illinois
- Died: March 10, 1981 (aged 87) Montreal, Quebec

Polydore Beaulac (July 8, 1893 – March 10, 1981) was a politician in the Quebec, Canada. He served as Member of the Legislative Assembly.

He was born on July 8, 1893, in Chicago, Illinois. He was a councilmember in Shawinigan from 1930 to 1932.

Beaulac ran as an Independent Liberal candidate in the district of Saint-Maurice—Laflèche in 1935 and finished second. He then ran as a Liberal candidate to the Legislative Assembly of Quebec in 1936 and lost. In 1939 though, he ran again and defeated Union Nationale incumbent Marc Trudel. He did not run for re-election in 1944.

He died on March 10, 1981, in the Montreal area.
