= Georges-Isidore Delisle =

Canadian politician

Georges-Isidore Delisle (French pronunciation: [ʒɔʁʒ izidɔʁ dəlil]) was a politician in Quebec, Canada. He served as Member of the Legislative Assembly.

== Early life ==
He was born on June 30, 1856, in Sherbrooke, Eastern Townships, Canada East.

== Provincial politics ==
Delisle was elected as a Liberal candidate to the Legislative Assembly of Quebec in 1908, representing the district of Saint-Maurice. He was re-elected in 1912, 1916 and 1919.

== Death ==
He died in office on March 26, 1920.

National Assembly of Quebec
Preceded by Louis-Philippe Fiset (Liberal)	MLA, District of Saint-Maurice; 1908–1920	Succeeded by Léonide-Nestor-Arthur Ricard (Liberal)
