= Séverin Létourneau =

Canadian politician and judge

The Honourable Séverin Létourneau
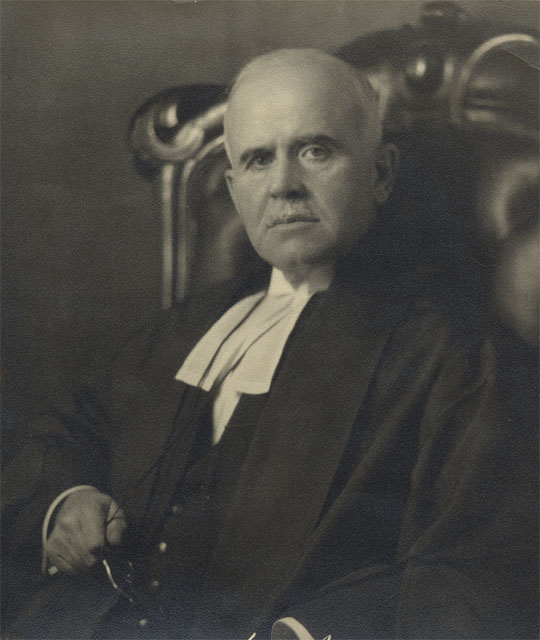

Chief Justice of Quebec
- In office 9 January 1943 – 17 December 1949

Member of the Legislative Council of Quebec for Rigaud
- In office 1919–1922

Member of the Legislative Assembly of Quebec for Montréal-Hochelaga
- In office 1912–1919

Personal details
- Born: 23 May 1871 Saint-Constant, Quebec, Canada
- Died: 17 December 1949 (aged 78) Montreal, Quebec, Canada
- Party: Liberal Party of Quebec

Séverin Létourneau (23 May 1871 – 17 December 1949) was a Canadian politician and judge from Quebec who served as Chief Justice of Quebec between 1943 and 1949.

Létourneau was born in Saint-Constant, Quebec, the son of Hubert Létourneau and of Claire Vadney Lanctôt. He was educated at the École normale Jacques-Cartier and at the Université Laval à Montréal (now Université de Montréal), where he took the LL.B. in 1884. After articling in the chambers of Louis Conrad Pelletier, he was called to the Quebec bar on 9 July 1895. He was appointed King's Counsel on 30 June 1906.

A Liberal, he was President of the Club libéral Saint-Henri between 1908 and 1911, Liberal Party organiser for the district of Montreal between 1911 and 1921, and President of the Fédération des clubs libéraux de la province de Québec in 1914. He was elected to the Legislative Assembly of Quebec for Hochelaga in 1912 and reelected without opposition in 1916. He stood down from the Legislative Assembly in 1919, and represented Rigaud in the Legislative Council of Quebec between 1919 and 1922.

Létourneau was appointed a judge of the Court of King's Bench of Quebec on 25 January 1922 and Chief Justice of Quebec on 9 January 1943. In 1942, he served as Administrator of Quebec in the absence of the Lieutenant Governor of Quebec. He died in office in 1949.

Létourneau married Antonine Lanctôt on 30 June 1896.
