= Luc Trudel =

Canadian politician

MNA for Saint-Maurice
- In office 2012–2014
- Preceded by: Claude Pinard
- Succeeded by: Pierre Giguère

Personal details
- Party: Parti Québécois

Luc Trudel is a Canadian politician. He was a Parti Québécois member of the National Assembly of Quebec for the riding of Saint-Maurice from 2012 to 2014, first elected in the 2012 election.
