= Montréal-Hochelaga =

Coordinates: 45.545°N 73.546°W

Quebec electoral district

Defunct provincial electoral district
- Legislature: National Assembly of Quebec
- District created: 1912
- District abolished: 1923
- First contested: 1912
- Last contested: 1919

Montréal-Hochelaga (French pronunciation: [mɔ̃ʁeal ɔʃlaɡa]) was a former provincial electoral district in the Montreal region of Quebec, Canada that elected members to the Legislative Assembly of Quebec.

It was created for the 1912 election from part of Hochelaga electoral district. Its final election was in 1919. It was redistributed in the 1923 election into the electoral districts of Montreal–Saint-Henri and Montréal-Verdun, with small parts going to Montréal–Saint-Georges and Montréal–Sainte-Anne.

== Members of the Legislative Assembly ==
- Séverin Létourneau, Liberal (1912–1919)
- Joseph-Hercule Bédard, Liberal (1919–1923)
