= Léonide-Nestor-Arthur Ricard =

Canadian politician

Léonide-Nestor-Arthur Ricard was a politician in Quebec, Canada. He served as Member of the Legislative Assembly.

== Early life ==
He was born on July 24, 1882, in Saint-Barnabé-Nord, Mauricie.

== Provincial Politics ==
Ricard was elected as a Liberal candidate to the Legislative Assembly of Quebec in a 1920 by-election, representing the district of Saint-Maurice. He succeeded Georges-Isidore Delisle who had recently died. He was re-elected in 1923.

== Death ==
He died in office on June 20, 1924, in Berthierville.

National Assembly of Quebec
Preceded by Georges-Isidore Delisle (Liberal)	MLA, District of Saint-Maurice; 1920–1924	Succeeded by Alphonse-Edgar Guillemette (Liberal)
