= Yves Duhaime =

Canadian politician (born 1939)

Minister of Finance of Quebec
- In office November 27, 1984 – October 16, 1985
- Premier: René Lévesque; Pierre-Marc Johnson
- Preceded by: Jacques Parizeau
- Succeeded by: Bernard Landry

Minister of Energy and Resources of Quebec
- In office April 30, 1981 – November 27, 1984
- Premier: René Lévesque

Minister of Industry, Commerce and Tourism of Quebec
- In office September 21, 1979 – April 30, 1981
- Premier: René Lévesque

Minister of Tourism, Hunting and Fishing of Quebec
- In office November 26, 1976 – September 21, 1979
- Premier: René Lévesque

Member of the National Assembly of Quebec
- In office November 15, 1976 – December 2, 1985
- Preceded by: Marcel Bérard
- Succeeded by: Yvon Lemire
- Constituency: Saint-Maurice

Personal details
- Born: 27 May 1939 (age 87) Chicoutimi, Quebec, Canada
- Party: Parti Québécois
- Other political affiliations: Bloc Québécois
- Spouse: Lise Racine
- Children: 2
- Education: McGill University; Institut d'Études Politiques de Paris
- Profession: Lawyer

Military service
- Allegiance: Canada
- Branch/service: Canadian Army
- Years of service: 1960s
- Rank: Captain
- Unit: 62nd (Shawinigan) Field Artillery Regiment

Yves Duhaime (born May 27, 1939) is a former politician in Quebec, Canada. He served as Cabinet Member and Member of the National Assembly of Quebec.

== Early life ==
Duhaime was born in Chicoutimi, and grew up in Shawinigan.

In the 1960s, Duhaime was an officer with the 62nd (Shawinigan) Field Artillery Regiment. He reached the rank of Captain and served as Adjutant of the military unit; he also served as president of the Officers' Mess in 1964. He completed officer training at the Royal Artillery School in Picton, Ontario, before commencing his legal career.

He attended Séminaire Sainte-Marie and obtained a law degree from McGill University in Montreal, then pursued studies in international relations at the Institut d'Études Politiques de Paris (Sciences Po). He was admitted to the Barreau du Québec in June 1963 and practised law in the Mauricie region during the 1960s and 1970s.

== Provincial politics ==
Duhaime ran as a Parti Québécois candidate in 1970, 1973 and 1976 in the district of Saint-Maurice. He was elected on his third attempt.

Premier René Lévesque appointed him to the Cabinet. Duhaime served as Minister of Tourism during his first term, with a mandate that included reform of access to hunting and fishing territories in Quebec. In 1978 the government terminated the historic system of private hunting and fishing clubs and created the network of zones d'exploitation contrôlée (ZECs), which opened large areas to the public under non-profit management. Contemporary analyses noted that, prior to the reform, more than 1,200 clubs controlled about 65,000 square kilometres of territory. Duhaime has been described in later commentary as one of the “pères des zecs”.

He was re-elected in 1981; he served as Minister of Energy and Resources from 1981 to 1984 and Minister of Finance from 1984 to 1985. As Energy and Resources minister, he advanced electricity export strategies and represented Quebec in energy files that included export arrangements with New England utilities, such as the 1983 Hydro-Québec agreement with the New England Power Pool, used to support major hydroelectric development. As Finance minister, he presented the provincial budget on April 23, 1985.

He did not run in 1985.

== Federal politics ==
Duhaime was a candidate in the 1997 leadership election for the Bloc Québécois, but finished second behind Gilles Duceppe. In the 1997 federal election he was BQ candidate in the district of Saint-Maurice against the incumbent Member of Parliament and Prime Minister Jean Chrétien. Chrétien won re-election with 47 percent of the vote; Duhaime finished second with 44 percent.

== Later career ==
After leaving provincial politics, Duhaime returned to the private and public sectors. He was appointed to the board of directors of the Bank of Canada in September 1986, served as a consultant in the engineering and industrial sectors, sat on the board of Natrel in 1991 and served as its president and chief executive officer from April 1992 to October 1994; he later joined the board of Le Devoir and became its president in January 2002. He also served as president of Groupe Énergie Inc. from October 2001 to October 9, 2004. He was president of the Conseil pour la souveraineté du Québec in 1995.

== Local politics ==
Yves Duhaime ran for Mayor of Shawinigan in 2009. He finished second with 29% of the vote against organized labour activist Michel Angers (55%) and Ralliement Municipal candidate Claude Villemure (16%).

== Personal life ==
Duhaime is married to Lise Racine; they have two sons.

== See also ==
- 62nd (Shawinigan) Field Artillery Regiment
- Mauricie
- Saint-Maurice Legislators
- Saint-Maurice
- Saint-Maurice Provincial Electoral District
- Shawinigan

National Assembly of Quebec
Preceded by Marcel Bérard (Liberal)	MNA, District of Saint-Maurice; 1976–1985	Succeeded by Yvon Lemire (Liberal)
