= Jean-Marie Richard =

Canadian politician

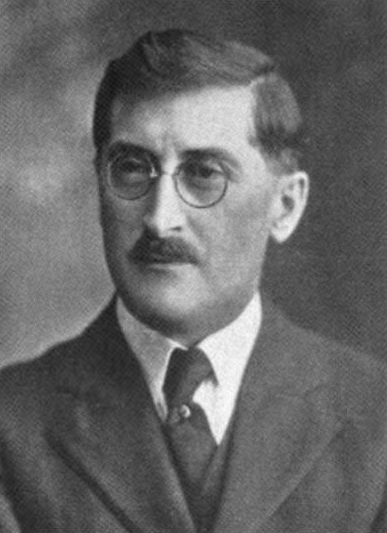

Member of the Legislative Assembly of Quebec
- In office 1921–1927
- Constituency: Verchères

Personal details
- Born: January 15, 1879; Contrecœur, Quebec, Canada
- Died: November 17, 1955 (aged 76); Contrecœur, Quebec, Canada
- Political party: Quebec Liberal
- Spouse: Jeanne Cartier (m. 1907)
- Children: 2
- Occupation: Notary, politician

Jean-Marie Richard (1879–1955) was a Canadian politician. He was the Liberal member of the Legislative Assembly of Quebec for Verchères from 1921 to 1927.

== Biography ==
Jean-Marie Richard was born in Contrecœur, Quebec on January 15, 1879.

He married Jeanne Cartier on June 18, 1907, and they had two children.

He died in Contrecœur on November 17, 1955.
