= Joseph-Ferdinand Daniel =

Canadian politician

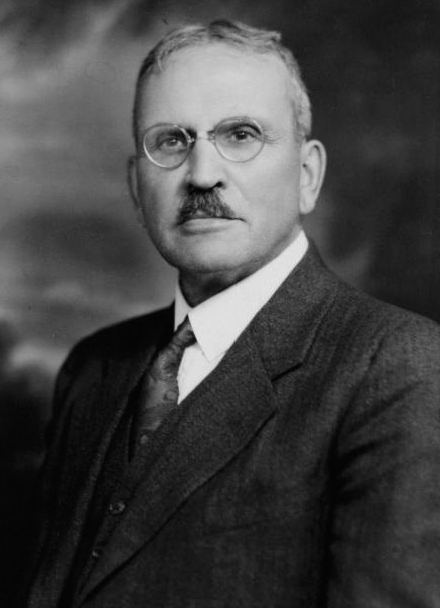

Member of the Legislative Assembly of Quebec for Montcalm
- In office 1917–1929
- Preceded by: Joseph-Alcide Dupuis
- Succeeded by: Joseph-Léonide Perron

Member of the Legislative Council of Quebec for de Lanaudière
- In office 1929–1940
- Preceded by: Gaspard De Serres
- Succeeded by: Félix Messier

Personal details
- Born: 4 November 1869 Saint-Esprit, Quebec
- Died: 1 August 1940 (aged 70) Montreal, Quebec
- Party: Liberal

Joseph-Ferdinand Daniel (4 November 1869 – 1 August 1940) was a Canadian politician.

Born in Saint-Esprit, Quebec, Daniel studied at the Séminaire de Joliette and the Université Laval à Montréal. He became a notary in 1896 and practised in Saint-Esprit. He was acclaimed to the Legislative Assembly of Quebec for Montcalm in a 1917 byelection. A Liberal, he was re-elected in 1919, 1923, and 1927. He was appointed to the Legislative Council of Quebec for the division of Lanaudière in 1929. He died in office in Montreal in 1940. His son, Jean-Gaétan Daniel, was also a politician.
