= Georges Mayrand =

Canadian politician

Member of the Legislative Assembly of Quebec for Montréal-Dorion
- In office 1912–1919
- Preceded by: District was created in 1912
- Succeeded by: Aurèle Lacombe

Personal details
- Born: August 21, 1876 Saint-Charles-de-Grondines, Quebec
- Died: January 20, 1951 (aged 74) Montreal, Quebec
- Party: Liberal

Georges Mayrand (August 21, 1876 – January 20, 1951) was a Canadian politician.

Born in Saint-Charles-de-Grondines, Quebec, Mayrand was elected to the Legislative Assembly of Quebec for Montréal-Dorion in 1912. A Liberal, he was re-elected in 1916 and defeated in 1919.

He died in Montreal in 1951.
