= 1923 Quebec general election =

Canadian provincial election

- February 5, 1923

85 seats in the 16th Legislative Assembly of Quebec 43 seats were needed for a majority
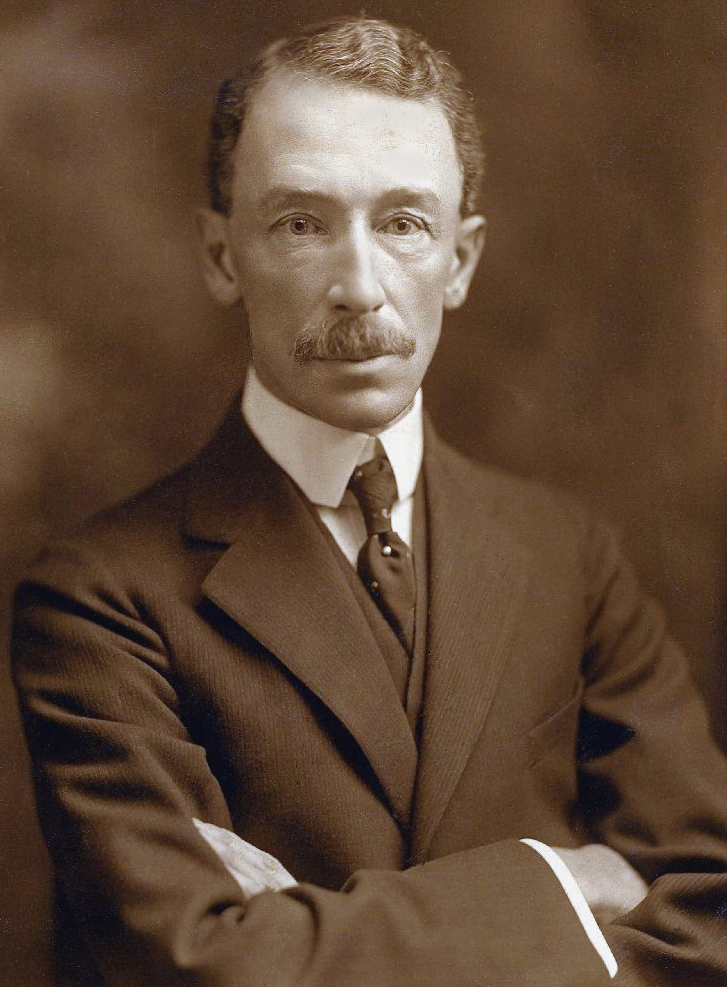

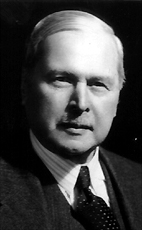
	First party	Second party
Leader	Louis-Alexandre Taschereau	Arthur Sauvé
Party	Liberal	Conservative
Leader since	1920	1915
Leader's seat	Montmorency	Deux-Montagnes
Last election	74 seats, 51.91%	5 seats, 16.96%
Seats won	64	20
Seat change	▼10	▲15
Popular vote	149,730	114,285
Percentage	51.52%	39.32%
Swing	▼0.39pp	▲22.36pp
Premier before election
Louis-Alexandre Taschereau
Liberal
Premier after election
Louis-Alexandre Taschereau
Liberal

The 1923 Quebec general election was held on February 5, 1923, to elect members of the 16th Legislative Assembly of Quebec, Canada. The incumbent Quebec Liberal Party, led by Louis-Alexandre Taschereau, was re-elected, defeating the Quebec Conservative Party, led by Arthur Sauvé.

It was the first of four election victories in a row for Taschereau. However, he had held office since 1920, following the resignation of the previous premier, Lomer Gouin.

== Redistribution of ridings ==
An Act passed prior to the election increased the number of MLAs from 81 to 85 through the following changes:

Abolished ridings	New ridings
Divisions of ridings
Labelle (Note: Protected seat under British North America Act 1867, s. 80. Successor seats had same status.)	Labelle; Papineau
Témiscaming	Abitibi; Témiscaming
Creation of riding from parts of others
	Matapédia (Note: formed from part of Matane)
	Montréal-Mercier (Note: formed from parts of Montréal-Dorion and Montréal-Laurier)
	Montréal-Verdun (Note: formed from part of Jacques-Cartier)
Merger of ridings
Laprairie; Napierville	Napierville-Laprairie
Change of name
Montréal-Hochelaga	Montréal–Saint-Henri

== Results ==
This was the last Quebec election in which a candidate won in multiple ridings. Joseph-Édouard Perrault took both Abitibi and Arthabaska, and he would later resign from Abitibi to allow Hector Authier to be elected in a byelection later that year.

Elections to the Legislative Assembly of Quebec (1923)
Political party	Party leader	MLAs				Votes			
Political party	Party leader	Candidates	1919	1923	±	#	±	%	± (pp)
Government candidates									
█ Liberal	Louis-Alexandre Taschereau	83	74	64	10▼	149,730	82,438▲	51.52	0.39▼
█ Labour	–	3	2	–	2▼	5,554	6,952▼	1.91	7.74▼
Opposition candidates									
█ Conservative	Arthur Sauvé	66	5	20	15▲	114,285	92,295▲	39.32	22.36▲
█ Liberal	–	3	–	1	1▲	3,684	New	1.27	New
█ Independent	–	6	–	–	–	4,931	New	1.70	New
█ Farmer	–	3	–	–	–	3,180	New	1.09	New
█ Labour	–	3	–	–	–	2,439	New	0.84	New
Other candidates									
█ Independent-Liberal	–	10	–	–	–	5,586	16,316▼	1.92	14.96▼
█ Labour	–	1	–	–	–	925	New	0.32	New
█ Independent-Conservative	–	1	–	–	–	335	New	0.11	New
Total		179	81	85		290,649		100%	
Rejected ballots						3,808	2,360▲		
Voter turnout						294,457	163,273▲	62.02	6.91▲
Registered electors (contested ridings only)						474,794	236,742▲		
Candidates returned by acclamation				8	37▼				

Popular vote
PLQ	51.52%
PCQ	39.32%
Others	9.16%

Seats summary
PLQ	75.29%
PCQ	23.53%
Others	1.18%

Eight Liberal MLAs were returned by acclamation:

How nominated	Riding	Member returned
One candidate only	Îles-de-la-Madeleine	Joseph-Édouard Caron
One candidate only	Lotbinière	Joseph-Napoléon Francoeur
One candidate only	Québec-Comté	Aurèle Leclerc
One candidate only	Québec-Est	Louis-Alfred Létourneau
Two candidates, but one withdrew	Bellechasse	Antonin Galipeault
Two candidates, but one withdrew	Gaspé	Gustave Lemieux
Two candidates, but one withdrew	Matapédia	Joseph Dufour
Two candidates, but one withdrew	Saint-Jean	Alexis Bouthillier

== See also ==
- List of Quebec premiers
- Politics of Quebec
- Timeline of Quebec history
- List of Quebec political parties
- 16th Legislative Assembly of Quebec
