= Shawinigan-Sud =

Coordinates: 46°32′0″N 72°45′0″W

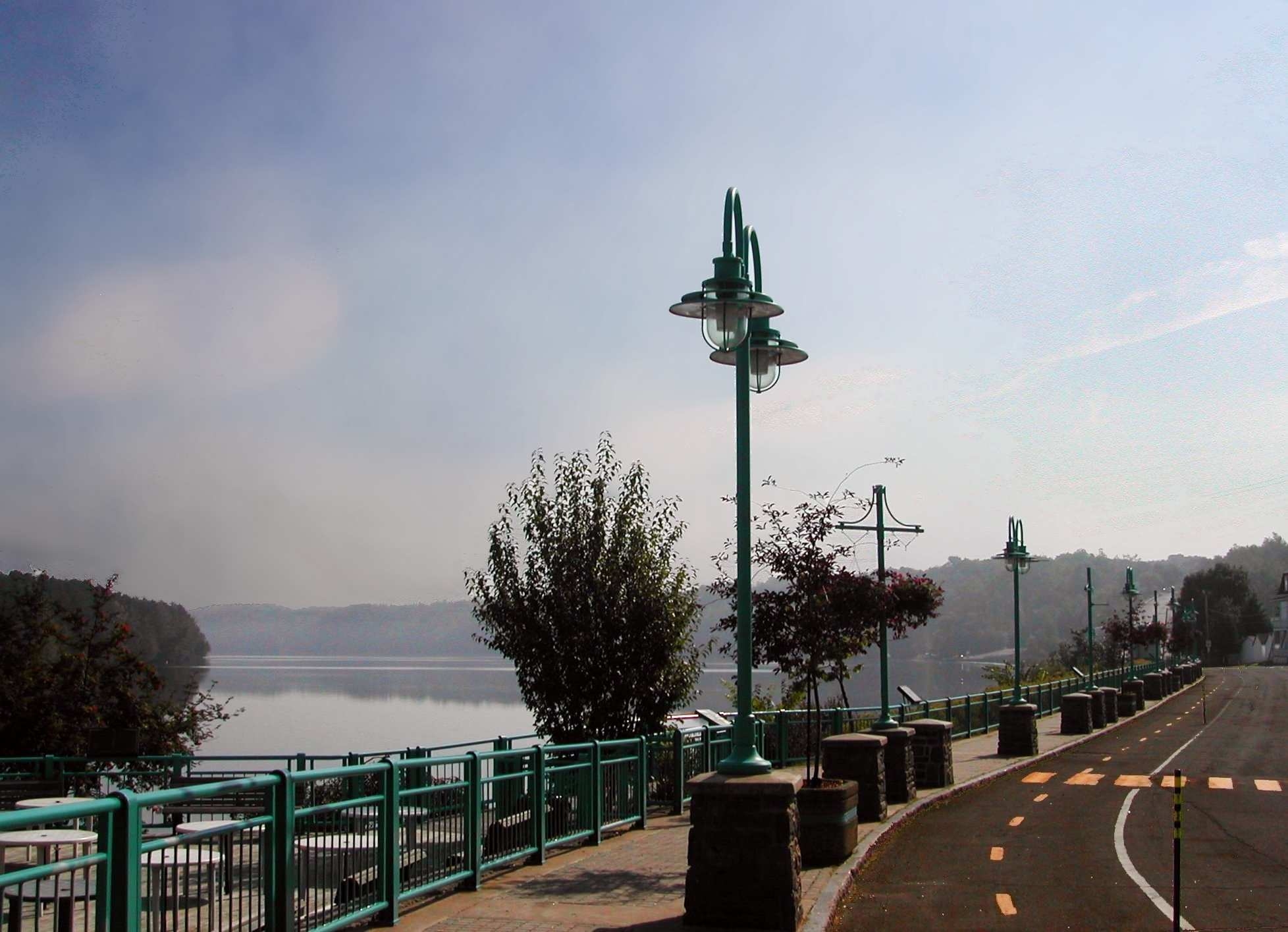

Shawinigan-Sud is a predominantly French-speaking settlement in the Mauricie area in Quebec, Canada, on the Saint-Maurice River. In 1996, its population was 11,804.

== History ==
Shawinigan-Sud was incorporated as a village in 1912 and was called Almaville until 1948. It developed primarily as a residential hub for Shawinigan. Its status was upgraded from village to town in 1961.

Prior to the municipal reorganization in Quebec in 2002, Shawinigan-Sud was a separate municipality in the Le Centre-de-la-Mauricie Regional County Municipality. In January 2002, it was merged into the new City of Shawinigan.

In colloquial language, the older and lower section of Shawinigan-Sud, closer to Saint-Maurice River, is called Almaville en bas. The rest of the community, which is built on higher ground, is known as Almaville en haut.

National Hockey League player Martin Gélinas grew up in Shawinigan-Sud.

== Religion ==
Even though many of them are not church-goers, most residents of Shawinigan-Sud are Catholic. Four Catholic parishes exist on Shawinigan-Sud's territory. Those parishes are:

| Parish | Church Location | Year of Foundation | Number of Parishioners |
| Notre-Dame-de-la-Présentation (Our Lady of the Presentation) | 825, 2^{e} Avenue | 1914 | 738 |
| Sainte-Jeanne-d'Arc (Saint Joan of Arc) | 1050, 5^{e} Avenue | 1923 | 2,750 |
| Saint-Sauveur (Holy Savior) | 615, 123^{e} Rue | 1947 | 5,695 |
| Saint-André (Saint Andrew) | 1795, 14^{e} Avenue | 1952 | 3,375 |

The current church building of Notre-Dame-de-la-Présentation parish was completed in 1924. From 1942 to 1955, the structure was decorated with the artwork of painter Ozias Leduc and his assistant Gabrielle Messier.

Members of the Baptist community attend church at Église Évangélique Baptiste De Shawinigan-Sud, located at 2500, route Lamothe.

A Society of St. Pius X retreat house can be found at 905, Rang St-Mathieu Est. It has been active since 1951.

== Education ==
There are four public schools. All are under the supervision of the Commission scolaire de l'Énergie school board.

| School | Level | Location | Number of Students |
| École secondaire Val-Mauricie | Secondary | 1200, rue Val-Mauricie | 1,372 |
| Saint-André (Saint Andrew) | Elementary | 1350, 120^{e} Rue | 289 |
| Saint-Georges (Saint George) | Elementary | 975, 111^{e} Rue | 175 |
| Saint-Paul (Saint Paul) | Elementary | 750, 125^{e} Rue | 291 |

The École secondaire Val-Mauricie school has also had links with CISV International as it was used for a 4-week camp in the summer of 2004 which had children from Great Britain, Sweden, Germany, Italy, Mexico, Portugal, Brazil, Lebanon, Japan, Usa & Canada.

== Mayors of Shawinigan-Sud ==
From 1912 until 2002, Shawinigan-Sud had its own mayor. The mayors of Shawinigan-Sud were:

| # | Mayor | Taking Office | Leaving |
| 1 | Omer Landry | 1912 | 1913 |
| 2 | Hercule Lambert | 1914 | 1925 |
| 3 | Philippe Veilleux | 1925 | 1927 |
| 4 | Georges Gauthier | 1927 | 1929 |
| 5 | Gédéon Veilleux | 1929 | 1935 |
| 6 | Napoléon Boulanger | 1935 | 1939 |
| 4 | Georges Gauthier | 1939 | 1941 |
| 7 | Omer Leblanc | 1941 | 1946 |
| 8 | Gérard Garceau | 1946 | 1947 |
| 9 | Alcide Raîche | 1947 | 1951 |
| 10 | Charles-Édouard Lambert | 1951 | 1955 |
| 11 | Bruno Sigmen | 1955 | 1957 |
| 12 | Philippe Demers | 1957 | 1962 |
| 11 | Bruno Sigmen | 1962 | 1964 |
| 13 | Louis-Philippe Lacoursière | 1964 | 1970 |
| 14 | Albert Landry | 1970 | 1977 |
| 15 | Gilles Grondin | 1977 | 1985 |
| 15 | Claude Pinard | 1985 | 1989 |
| 16 | Marcel Vézina | 1989 | 1997 |
| 17 | Maurice Héroux | 1997 | 2001 |
