= Joseph Dufour (Quebec MLA) =

Canadian politician

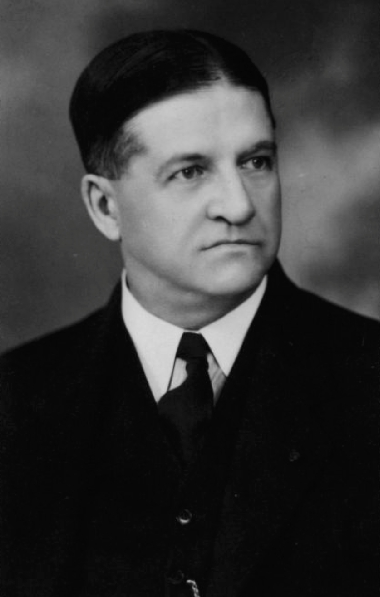

Member of the Legislative Assembly of Quebec for Matane
- In office 1919–1923
- Preceded by: Octave Fortin
- Succeeded by: Joseph-Arthur Bergeron

Member of the Legislative Assembly of Quebec for Matapédia
- In office 1923–1936
- Preceded by: District created
- Succeeded by: Fernand Paradis
- In office 1939–1944
- Preceded by: Fernand Paradis
- Succeeded by: Philippe Cossette

Personal details
- Born: November 28, 1874 Saint-Pascal, Quebec
- Died: November 2, 1956 (aged 81) Saint-Noël, Quebec
- Party: Liberal

Joseph Dufour (November 28, 1874 – November 2, 1956) was a Canadian provincial politician.

Born in Saint-Pascal, Quebec, Dufour was the member of the Legislative Assembly of Quebec for Matane and Matapédia. In 1922, he was made a Commander of the Order of St. Gregory the Great.
