= Walter Reed (Canadian politician) =

Canadian politician

Walter Reed (February 22, 1869 – January 16, 1945) was a construction contractor and political figure in Quebec. He represented L'Assomption in the Legislative Assembly of Quebec from 1908 to 1935 as a Liberal.

He was born in Saint-Clément, Quebec, the son of William Reed and Vitaline Langevin, and was educated in Beauharnois. In 1890, he married Léa Champagne. Reed served on the city council for Maisonneuve from 1901 to 1905 and was mayor from 1905 to 1907. He lived in L'Assomption from 1910 to 1935. He was defeated when he ran for reelection to the Quebec assembly in 1935 and 1936. He died in Montreal at the age of 75 and was buried in L'Assomption.
