= Gustave Lemieux =

Canadian politician (1864–1956)

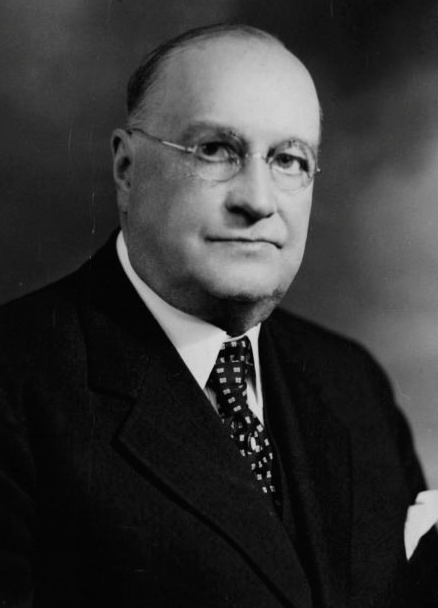

Member of the Legislative Assembly of Quebec for Gaspé
- In office 1912–1931
- Preceded by: Joseph-Léonide Perron
- Succeeded by: District was abolished in 1931

Member of the Legislative Council of Quebec for Montarville
- In office 1932–1956
- Preceded by: Narcisse Pérodeau
- Succeeded by: Émile Lesage

Personal details
- Born: 19 December 1864 Montreal, Canada East
- Died: 19 July 1956 (aged 91) Montreal, Quebec
- Party: Liberal

Gustave Lemieux (19 December 1864 – 19 July 1956) was a Canadian politician.

Born in Montreal, Canada East, Lemieux was acclaimed to the Legislative Assembly of Quebec for Gaspéin 1912. A Liberal, he was re-elected in 1916, 1919, 1923, and 1927. He was appointed to the Legislative Council of Quebec for Montarville in 1932 and served until his death in 1956.

His brothers, Louis-Joseph Lemieux and Rodolphe Lemieux, were both politicians.
