= 1919 Quebec general election =

Canadian provincial election

- June 23, 1919

81 seats in the 15th Legislative Assembly of Quebec 41 seats were needed for a majority
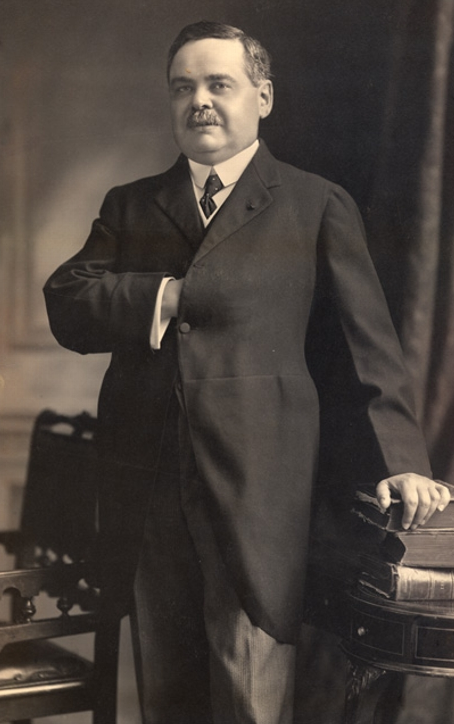

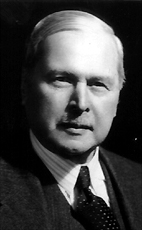
	First party	Second party
Leader	Lomer Gouin	Arthur Sauvé
Party	Liberal	Conservative
Leader since	1905	1915
Leader's seat	Portneuf	Deux-Montagnes
Last election	75 seats, 60.57%	6 seats, 35.09%
Seats won	74	5
Seat change	▼1	▼1
Popular vote	67,292	21,990
Percentage	51.91%	16.96%
Swing	▼8.66pp	▼18.13pp
Premier before election
Lomer Gouin
Liberal
Premier after election
Lomer Gouin
Liberal

The 1919 Quebec general election was held on June 23, 1919, to elect members of the 15th Legislative Assembly of Quebec, Canada. The incumbent Quebec Liberal Party, led by Lomer Gouin, was re-elected, defeating the Quebec Conservative Party, led by Arthur Sauvé.

Gouin, who had held office since 1905, resigned precisely one year after the election to make way for his successor Louis-Alexandre Taschereau. Gouin himself had originally come to power in much the same way, after his predecessor Simon-Napoléon Parent resigned soon after winning his final election.

== Results ==
Summary of 1919 Quebec general election
Party	Party leader	Candidates	Seats			Popular Vote			
Party	Party leader	Candidates	1916	Elected	±	#	±	%	± (pp)
Liberal	Lomer Gouin	79	75	74	1▼	67,292	58,974▼	51.91	8.66▼
Conservative	Arthur Sauvé	20	6	5	1▼	21,990	73,147▼	16.96	18.13▼
Parti ouvrier		7	–	2	2▲	12,506	10,674▲	9.65	8.77▲
Independent-Liberal		22	–	–	–	21,902	14,695▲	16.88	13.42▲
Liberal-Democrat		5	–	–	–	4,399	New	3.38	New
Liberal–Labour		1	–	–	–	1,457	New	1.12	New
Total		134	81			129,636		100%	
Rejected ballots						1,448	1,319▼		
Voter turnout						131,184	80,035▼	55.11	7.44▼
Registered electors (contested ridings only)						238,052	99,644▼		
Candidates returned by acclamation				45	19▲				

Popular vote
PLQ	51.91%
PCQ	16.96%
Others	31.13%

Seats summary
PLQ	91.36%
PCQ	6.17%
Others	2.47%

Resulting composition of the 15th Legislative Assembly of Quebec
Source		Party			
Source		Lib	Con	PO	Total
Seats retained	Incumbents returned	30			30
Seats retained	Open seats held		1		1
Seats retained	Acclamation	43	2		45
Seats changing hands	Incumbents defeated	1	1	1	3
Seats changing hands	Open seats gained		1	1	2
Total		74	5	2	81

== See also ==
- List of Quebec premiers
- Politics of Quebec
- Timeline of Quebec history
- List of Quebec political parties
- 15th Legislative Assembly of Quebec
