= Burrill (disambiguation) =

Burrill is a small village near Bedale in North Yorkshire, England. Burrill may also refer to:

== Places ==
- Burrillville, Rhode Island
- Burrill with Cowling, civil parish in North Yorkshire, England
- Burrill Lake, village in the South Coast region of New South Wales, Australia
- Mount Burrill, mountain on the eastern edge of Malta

== People ==
=== Burrill as given name ===
- Burrill Phillips (1907–1988), American composer, teacher, and pianist
- Burrill Bernard Crohn (1884–1983), American gastroenterologist

=== Burrill as surname ===
- Billie Ann Burrill (1921–2010), American physical education teacher and champion masters swimmer
- Charles L. Burrill (1862–1931), American banker and politician who served as the Treasurer and Receiver-General of Massachusetts
- Edgar White Burrill (1883–1958), American literary critic and lecturer
- Gary Burrill (born 1955), Canadian politician
- George T. Burrill (1810?– 1856), first sheriff of Los Angeles County, California
- Hugh Burrill, Canadian television sports anchor and reporter
- James Burrill, Jr. (1772–1820), Federalist-party United States senator representing the state of Rhode Island
- Mary P. Burrill (1881–1946), early 20th-century African-American playwright and educator
- Thomas Jonathan Burrill (1839–1916), American botanist
- Truman N. Burrill (1832–1896), chief of the Bureau of Engraving in the U.S. Department of the Treasury
- Vivian Burrill (born 1854), politician in Shawinigan, Quebec
- William G. Burrill (1894-1949), American bishop
