= Hugh Macmillan =

Hugh Macmillan may refer to:

- Hugh Macmillan, Baron Macmillan (1873–1952), Scottish advocate, judge, parliamentarian and civil servant
- Hugh Macmillan (minister) (1833–1903), Scottish minister of the Free Church of Scotland

== See also ==
- Hugh McMillan (disambiguation)
