= Arthur Dufresne =

Joseph-Arthur Dufresne (1861-1933) was a local politician in Shawinigan, Quebec. He was the second mayor of Shawinigan. He was born in 1861 in Trois-Rivières, Mauricie and married to Georgiana Larouche, from Blind River, ON Famille directe. He moved to Shawinigan after he was offered a job by the Shawinigan Water & Power Company.

He served as a council member in 1901 and 1902 and became mayor of the city in 1902.

He left Shawinigan and moved back to Trois-Rivières in 1903. He became the owner of two hotels in Trois-Rivières QC. The first one (before the huge fire of June 1908 was on the "rue du Fleuve", the second one on the corner of the "rue des Forges" at "rue Royale". He died in 1933.

== See also ==
- Mayors of Shawinigan
- Mauricie
- Shawinigan, Quebec

Political offices
Preceded by Vivian Burrill	Mayors of Shawinigan; 1902–1902	Succeeded by Beaudry Leman
