= Listed buildings in Burrill with Cowling =

Burrill with Cowling is a civil parish in the county of North Yorkshire, England. It contains ten listed buildings that are recorded in the National Heritage List for England. Of these, one is listed at Grade I, the highest of the three grades, and the others are at Grade II, the lowest grade. The parish contains the villages of Burrill and Cowling and the surrounding countryside. The most important building in the parish is Cowling Hall, which is listed, together with a number of associated structures, and the other listed buildings are houses and a farmhouse.

== Key ==
Grade	Criteria
I	Buildings of exceptional interest, sometimes considered to be internationally important
II	Buildings of national importance and special interest

== Buildings ==
Name and location	Photograph	Date	Notes	Grade
Cowling Hall and Wing; 54.28437°N 1.63663°W		12th century	A house that has been altered and extended through the centuries, and is now two houses. The main block dates from the early 18th century, and is in rendered brick on a plinth, with stone dressings, quoins, and a pantile roof with stone coping to the left and shaped kneelers. There are two storeys and five bays, and a bay to the left under the same roof with three storeys. The middle bay projects and contains a doorway with a rusticated Doric surround, pilasters on plinths, a frieze with triglyphs, and a cornice. Above it is a window with consoles, a frieze, and a triangular pediment. The doorway and windows are flanked by narrow sash windows with double keystones, and the outer bays contain wider sash windows with double keystones. The projecting wing to the left dates partly from the 12th, and partly from the 17th century. It is in stone and has a stone slate roof with stone coping. There are two storeys and six bays. The doorway has moulded jambs and a pointed arch, and above it is an arched cusped window with a transom. The other windows are sashes, some with quoined surrounds, and to the left is a sundial. Inside, there is some exposed timber framing.	I
The Mount; 54.28522°N 1.63816°W	—	12th century	The field is enclosed by a stone wall containing a single-storey building in the northwest corner. In the building is carved and moulded stonework, and above are two semicircular-headed windows. At stages in the wall is evidence of former doorways.	II
Wall in front of Cowling Hall; 54.28435°N 1.63700°W		13th century (possible)	The wall in front of the hall, running along the road, is in stone. It is about 1 metre (3 ft 3 in) high, and has roll-moulded chamfered coping.	II
Wall south of Cowling Hall; 54.28422°N 1.63673°W	—	13th century	The wall is in stone. It contains a doorway with a pointed arch and a hood mould, and to its left is a trefoil-headed window.	II
Manor House; 54.27967°N 1.63306°W	—	1668	The house is in rendered stone with stone dressings, and has a stone slate roof with stone coping and shaped kneelers on the right gable, which contains a datestone. There are two storeys and an L-shaped plan, with a main range of five bays. The doorway has a broad stone surround, most of the windows have chamfered mullions, and the others are sashes.	II
Garden walls, Cowling Hall; 54.28413°N 1.63630°W	—	17th to 18th century	The walls on the north and south sides of the garden are in red brick, and are about 4 metres (13 ft) high and 30 metres (98 ft) long. The north wall contains a doorway.	II
Dovecote, Cowling Hall; 54.28363°N 1.63589°W	—	Mid 18th century	The dovecote to the southeast of the hall is in red brick on a chamfered plinth, with stepped eaves, a square plan and a pyramidal roof. On the west front is a doorway with a chamfered surround and a segmental head, above which is a square opening. Inside are rows of pigeon boxes on brick bands.	II
Low Cowling; 54.28313°N 1.63708°W	—	Mid 18th century	The house is in rendered stone, and has a Welsh slate roof with stone coping on the left. There are two storeys and four bays, the right bay projecting and gabled. The doorway and the windows, which are sashes, have stone lintels.	II
Ivy Cottage; 54.28022°N 1.63331°W	—	Mid to late 18th century	The house is in rendered stone, and has a tile roof with stone coping and shaped kneelers. There are two storeys, two bays, and a single-storey outshut on the right. The doorway is in the centre, and the windows are sashes.	II
High Pond House; 54.28474°N 1.66713°W		Early 19th century	The farmhouse is in rendered stone with a concrete slate roof. There are three storeys and four bays, with a lower two-storey block to the right. The doorway has a fanlight, the windows in the lower two floors are sashes, and in the top floor they are horizontally-sliding sashes.	II
