= Beaudry Leman =

Canadian civil engineer, politician and banker (1878–1951)

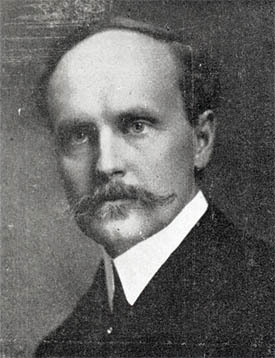
Beaudry Leman in 1922

Beaudry Leman (January 2, 1878 – 1951) was a Canadian civil engineer, politician and banker. He was the third mayor of Shawinigan Falls, Quebec (1902–1908). He was general manager of the Banque d'Hochelaga (1914–1924) and general manager (1924–1933) and president (1934–1947) of the Banque Canadienne Nationale.

== Biography ==
=== Engineering ===
Jean-Baptiste-Beaudry Leman was born in 1878 in Montreal, the son of Joseph Leman (1842–1885), physician, and Polyxène Beaudry (1842–1917). From 1895 to 1899, he studied at université catholique de Lille, where he obtained the title of civil engineer. Back in Montreal in 1899, he studied one year at McGill University and obtained the diploma of engineer. In 1900, he became an engineer with the Shawinigan Water & Power Company. He moved to Shawinigan Falls in 1900. He took part in the installation of the power plant and of the distribution network of the SW&P.

In 1902, Leman was elected mayor of the City of Shawinigan Falls in a close contest, winning only by a single ballot against J.A. Frigon. Leman was reelected as mayor in 1904 and in 1906. In 1906, he left the Shawinigan Water & Power Company and became involved in the construction of the Saint Maurice Valley railroad. In 1907, he left Shawinigan Falls and resigned as mayor, but his resignation became official in 1908.

in 1907, he moved to Montreal, where he was involved in construction works such as canalization and hydroelectric works.

=== Banking ===
On May 12, 1908, Beaudry Leman married Caroline Béique, daughter of Frédéric Liguori Béique, one of the founders of the Banque d'Hochelaga.

In 1912, Leman entered in the service of the Banque d'Hochelaga, initially as superintendent of the bank's branches. In 1914, he was appointed general manager of the bank. In 1924, when the Banque d'Hochelaga and the Banque Nationale merged to form the Banque Canadienne Nationale, Leman became general manager of the merged bank, and he held that position until 1933. In 1933, Leman became vice-president of the Banque Canadienne Nationale, and in 1934 he became the president of the bank, holding that position until 1947. In 1947, he became chairman of the board.

Leman was appointed as a member of several advisory committees by the federal government. He was a member of the advisory committee on the canalisation of the St. Lawrence River. In 1931–1932, he was a member of the Royal Commission to Inquire into Railways and Transportation in Canada. In 1933, he was a member of the Royal Commission on Banking and Currency in Canada, created by the Bennett government. Three of the five members of the commission recommended the creation of the Bank of Canada, although Beaudry Leman was one of the two minority members opposed to that creation.

He was director of many companies, including Shawinigan Water & Power, Quebec Power, Canada Steamship Lines, Fairchild Aircraft, Ogilvie Flour Mills, Delaware & Hudson Railway Corp., Montreal Tramways, Provincial Transport Co., Canadian Airways Ltd, Consolidated Bakeries, and Crédit Foncier Franco Canadien. He was vice-president of Allied War Supplies Ltd.

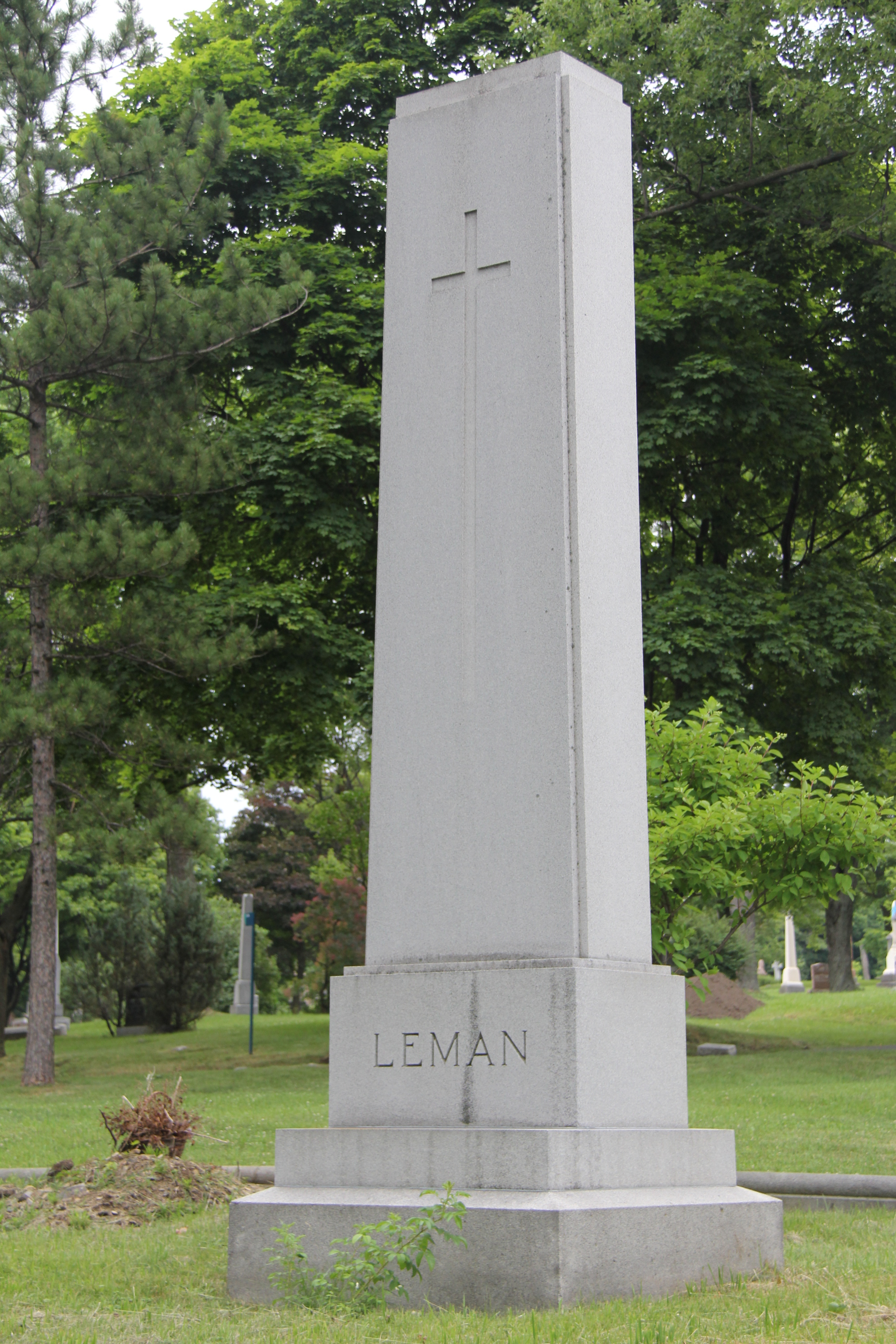
Beaudry Leman's tombstone in Montreal

He died in 1951 and was entombed at the Notre Dame des Neiges Cemetery in Montreal.

Avenue Beaudry-Leman, in the Sainte-Croix neighborhood in Shawinigan, was named to honor him.

The Jean-Baptiste-Beaudry-Leman house, built in 1936, is located in the Outremont neighbourhood in Montreal. It was one of the first international-style houses built in Montreal.

== Brochures ==
Written versions of some of Beaudry Leman's speeches were published as brochures.

- Les institutions de crédit, Bibliothèque de l'Action française, 1920, 15 p.
- Trois chapitres d'histoire monétaire canadienne, 1940, 6 p.
- [Comments on the] Rapport Rowell-Sirois, 1941, 17 p.
- Commentaires sur l'économie de guerre, 1942, 15 p.
- Comments arising from the revision of the Bank Act, 1944, 19 p.
- Hier et demain, Recueil de causeries, Banque canadienne nationale, 1952, 242 p.

== Footnotes ==
Political offices
Preceded by Arthur Dufresne	Mayors of Shawinigan; 1902–1908	Succeeded by Vivian Burrill
