= Cowling, Hambleton =

Village in North Yorkshire, England

Coordinates: 54°16′58″N 1°38′16″W

Cowling
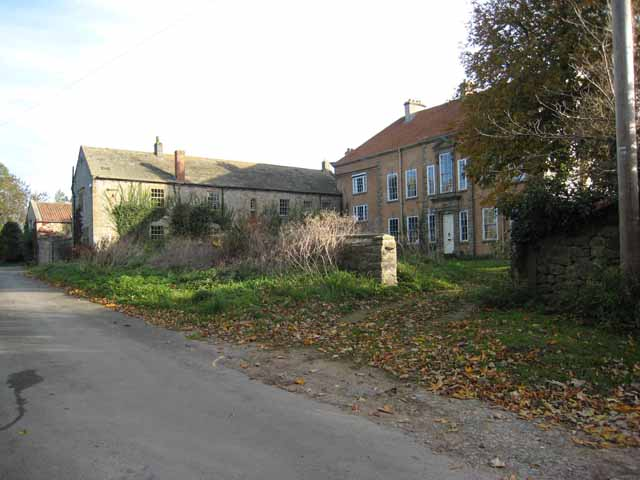
- Cowling Hall

- Location within North Yorkshire
- OS grid reference: SE236876
- Civil parish: Burrill with Cowling
- Unitary authority: North Yorkshire
- Ceremonial county: North Yorkshire
- Region: Yorkshire and the Humber
- Country: England
- Sovereign state: United Kingdom
- Post town: BEDALE
- Postcode district: DL8
- Police: North Yorkshire
- Fire: North Yorkshire
- Ambulance: Yorkshire

Cowling is a small village in North Yorkshire, England. It is in the parish of Burrill with Cowling and 2 miles (3.2 km) west of Bedale. The settlement is mentioned in the Domesday Book as Thornton, but later it was named Colling (a personal name) and then later becoming Cowling. Population statistics are listed within the civil parish of Burrill with Cowling.

== See also ==
- Listed buildings in Burrill with Cowling
