= Edmond Thibaudeau =

Edmond Thibaudeau (1872–1957), was a businessman and a local politician in Shawinigan, Quebec. He was the fifth Mayor of Shawinigan Falls, from 1915 to 1917.

He was born on 20 March 1872 in Saint-Grégoire, Centre-du-Québec. He was the son of Alcide Thibaudeau and Zénaïs Thibaudeau and has Acadian ancestry.

Beginning in 1903, Thibaudeau operated a small private power plant on the Shawinigan River (Petite Rivière Shawinigan) and was therefore competing with the Shawinigan, Water & Power Company (SW&P) for the local distribution of electricity. Thibaudeau's company was bought in 1917 by the SW&P, who operated it until 1932 and then dismantled it.

Thibaudeau is remembered for his flamboyant personality. He earned his nickname, L'Orignal à Thibaudeau (Thibaudeau the Moose), when during two years he regularly rode through the streets of Shawinigan on a moose-drawn carriage.

Thibaudeau was a City Councillor of Shawinigan Falls from 1904 to 1911 and from 1913 to 1915. He successfully ran for Mayor in 1915 against incumbent Joseph-Auguste Frigon.

Under his tenure the first streets (Second, Third, Fourth and Fifth streets) were paved.

Thibaudeau was defeated by Joseph-Auguste Frigon in 1917.

He died in 1957.

== See also ==
- Mayors of Shawinigan
- Mauricie
- Shawinigan, Quebec
- Shawinigan, Water & Power Company

Political offices
Preceded by Auguste Frigon	Mayors of Shawinigan; 1915–1917	Succeeded by Auguste Frigon
