= Tracy Thermal Generating Station =

Thermal power station in Sorel-Tracy, Quebec, Canada

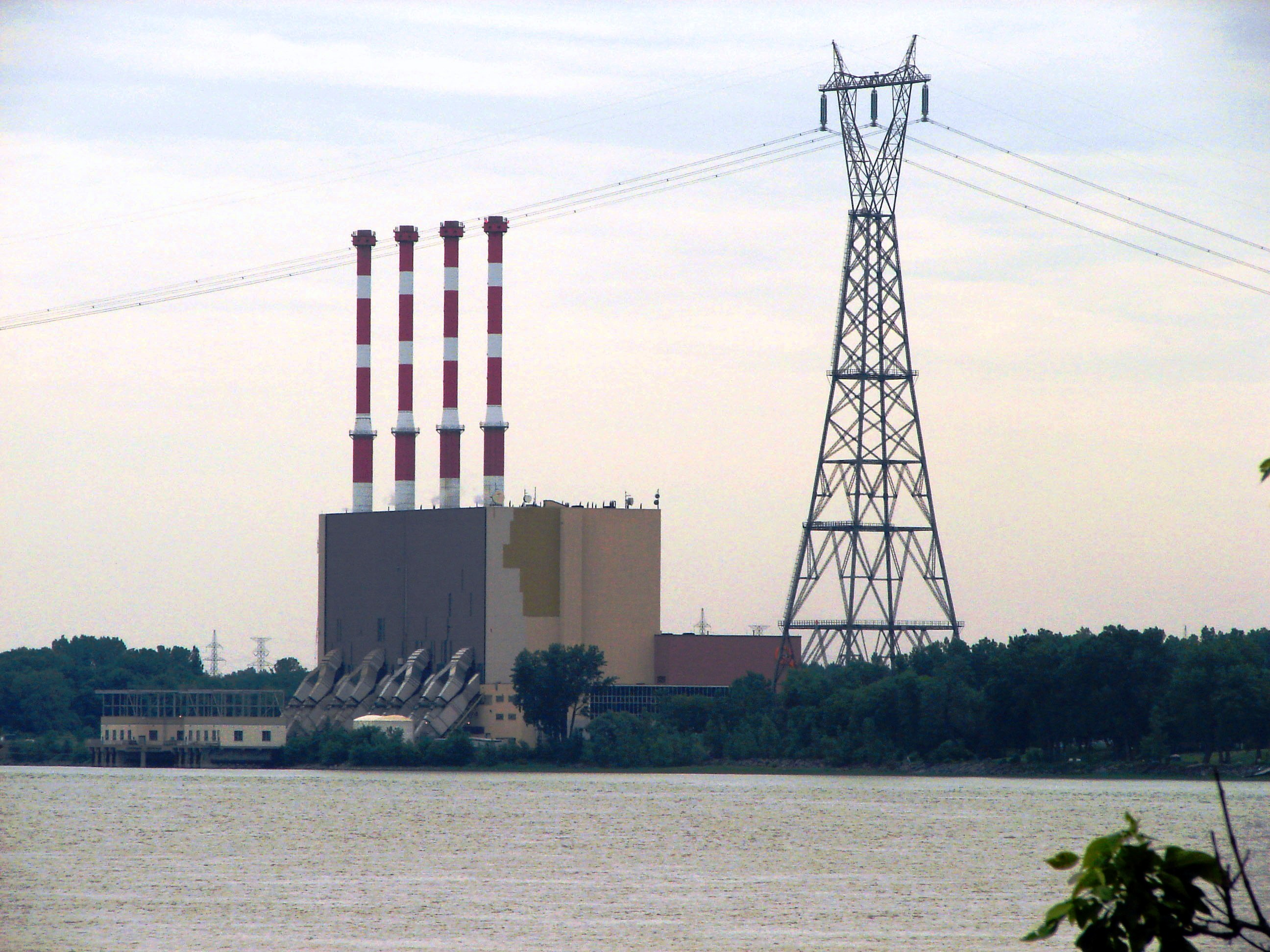
- The Tracy generating station in 2006.
- Official name: Centrale thermique de Tracy
- Country: Canada
- Location: Sorel-Tracy, Quebec
- Coordinates: 45°59′50″N 73°10′20″W
- Status: Decommissioned
- Construction began: March 1962
- Commission date: 1964
- Decommission date: March 1, 2011
- Owner: Hydro-Québec

Thermal power station
- Primary fuel: Heavy fuel oil

Power generation
- Units operational: 4 × 165 MW
- Make and model: Parsons
- Nameplate capacity: 660 MW

External links
- Commons: Related media on Commons

The Tracy Thermal Generating Station is a retired 660-megawatt heavy fuel oil-fueled thermal power station built from 1962 by the Shawinigan Water & Power Company and completed by Hydro-Québec after the buyout of all private electric utilities by the government of Quebec in 1963. Commissioned between 1964 and 1968, the plant is located on the banks of the Saint Lawrence River in the city of Sorel-Tracy, in the Montérégie Region.

Mainly used as a peaker plant, the Tracy facility was usually running during cold spells in the winter. It was sometimes operated year-round to supplement hydroelectric generation during low-water years.

Although it was operated only sporadically, the generating station has been criticized for its contribution to air pollution as it was one of Quebec's major sources of carbon dioxide (CO_{2}), sulfur dioxide (SO_{2}), nitrogen oxides (NO_{x}) and particulates (PM). Some commentators have accused Hydro-Québec of unnecessarily operating the Tracy thermal plant to export electricity by taking advantage of low fuel prices at certain times.

The Tracy Thermal Generating Station was kept as a reserve during the 2010–2011 winter and permanently shut down on March 1, 2011. Its dismantlement has started in 2013.

== Location ==
The power station is located in the former town of Tracy on the south shore of the Saint Lawrence River, 75 km (45 mi) north-east of Montreal, Quebec. Established in 1954, the town is separated from Sorel by the Richelieu River and has a long industrial and shipbuilding history, including the Marine Industries shipyard that has operated there since 1937. Other heavy industries, including foundries and steel mills, have set up shop in town. Tracy merged with Sorel to become the city of Sorel-Tracy in 2000.

The property is located at 12125 Marie-Victorin Road. The plant has been built on a 50.6-hectare (125 acres) lot, crossed by Quebec Route 132 (Marie-Victorin Road) and a Canadian National railroad track 6.5 km (4 mi) upstream from downtown Sorel-Tracy.

== History ==
Quebec utilities were faced with rapid demand growth in the decade that followed the end of World War II, as electricity consumption doubled in the Montreal area served by government-owned Hydro-Québec. The company initiated an ambitious construction program, building the Bersimis-1, Bersimis-2, Carillon and the third phase of the Beauharnois generating stations to keep up. After commissioning the Beaumont generating station in 1958, the Shawinigan Water & Power Company had exhausted most of its potential for the significant expansion of hydropower on the Saint-Maurice River and turned to Hydro-Québec to secure additional supplies. In February 1959, the Crown corporation informed officials at SW&P that it would be unable to supply incremental blocks of firm power because the supply needs of its own retail customers were just barely met.

SW&P then began planning for a 300-megawatt thermal power plant in Tracy to be built at a cost of C$45 million. The plant was designed to increase the company's peaking capacity to supplement its hydroelectric generation on the Saint-Maurice. It was slated to burn residual fuel oil, a by-product of a petrochemical plant to be built in nearby Varennes by a subsidiary, Shawinigan Chemicals Limited.

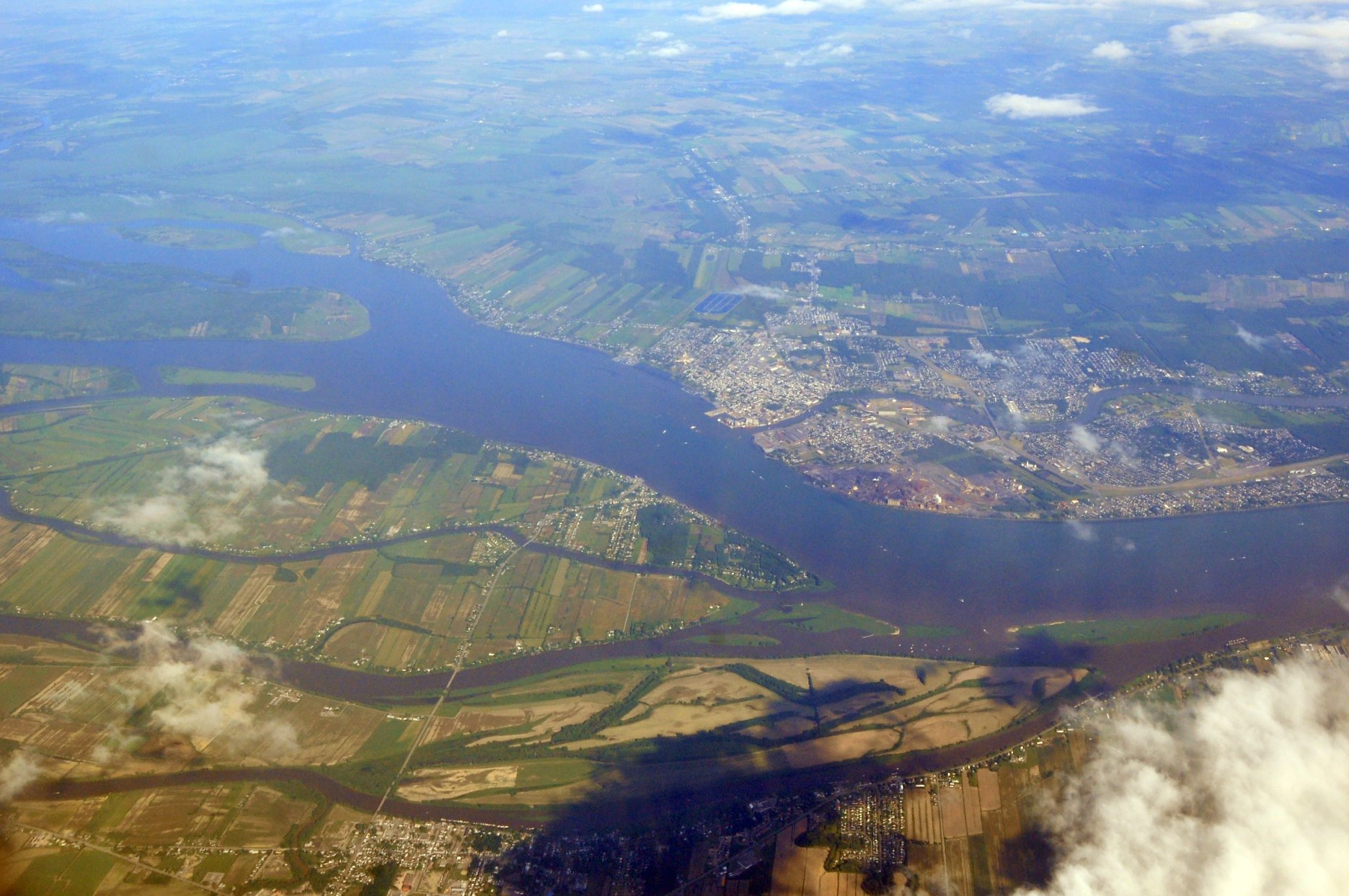
Sorel-Tracy.

Company officials raised the issue in November 1959 with the minister of Hydraulic Resources, Daniel Johnson, whose response was "mostly negative". The Tracy project, and the planned development of a hydroelectric power station on the Upper Saint-Maurice at Rapide des Coeurs, remained dormant for a while as Quebec was a few months away from a provincial election.

The new Premier, Jean Lesage, approved the new plant in May 1961, conditional to a commitment to build both the hydroelectric generating station at Rapide des Coeurs and the petrochemical plant in Varennes. The construction of the generating station and the petrochemical plant were announced on July 31. Work on the first phase of the Tracy plant started in March 1962 with United Engineers and Constructors of Philadelphia as the lead contractor. The work site employed 800 people.

The first two units were completed after Hydro-Québec's hostile takeover of SW&P and every other investor-owned public utility in the province, as part of Quebec's nationalization of electricity policy. Shortly after the 1963 buyout, Hydro ordered a second set of two units, to be built next to the first two, and gave the construction contract to Shawinigan Engineering. Work started in March 1965, and the last unit was delivered in February 1968.

In a booklet published by the public relations branch of Hydro-Québec in August 1965, shortly after the commissioning of the second unit, the utility explains its decision to upgrade the plant by "the urgent need to ensure extra capacity now and the advisability of creating an adequate reserve for future operations", adding that the role of the plant would change over its operating life. Cheaper to build than a hydroelectric power station and located closer to the major load centres, the plant could be used as spare capacity to supply peak-hour energy to the system, supplement hydro production in low-water years, and could come on-line during power outages or act as synchronous condensers, providing reactive power to control the voltage on the grid.

Transition between the former and the new owner during construction hit a few snags. The first two units are separated from the two units ordered by Hydro-Québec by a wall, because SW&P bond holders required the assets of the new subsidiary to remain distinct from those of its new parent company.

== Technical overview ==
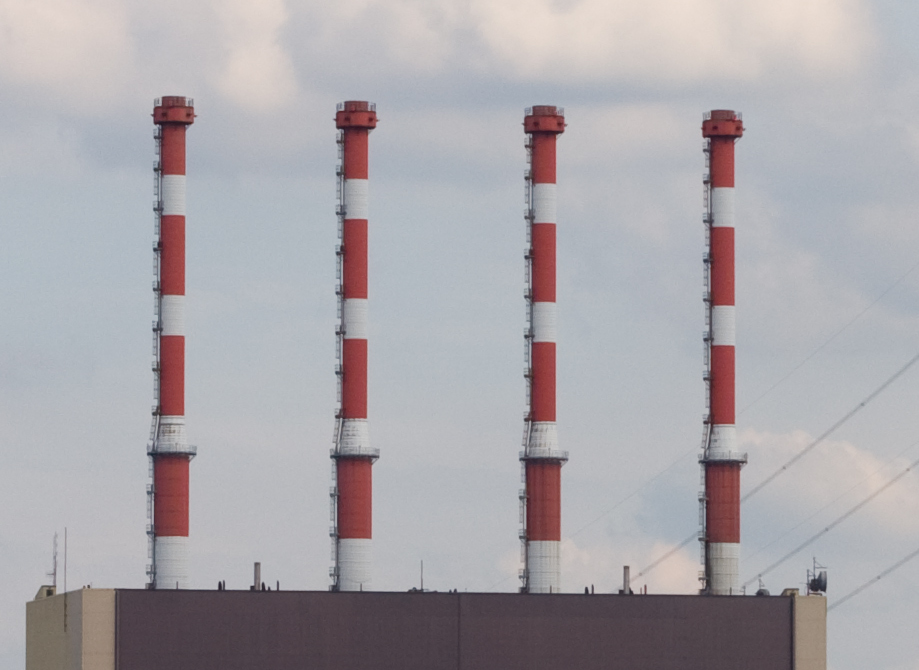
The generating station's four smokestacks.

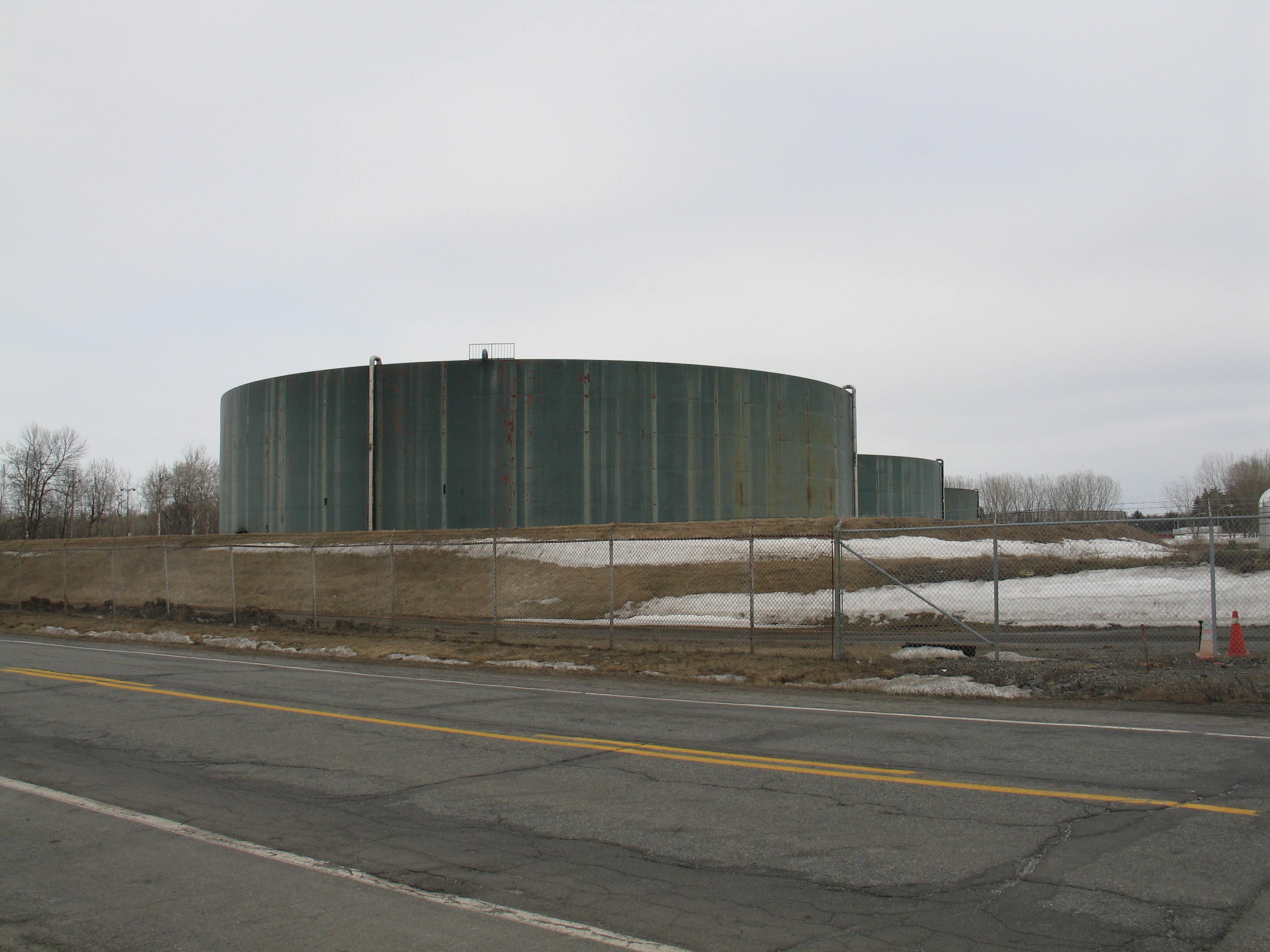
The fuel storage tanks.

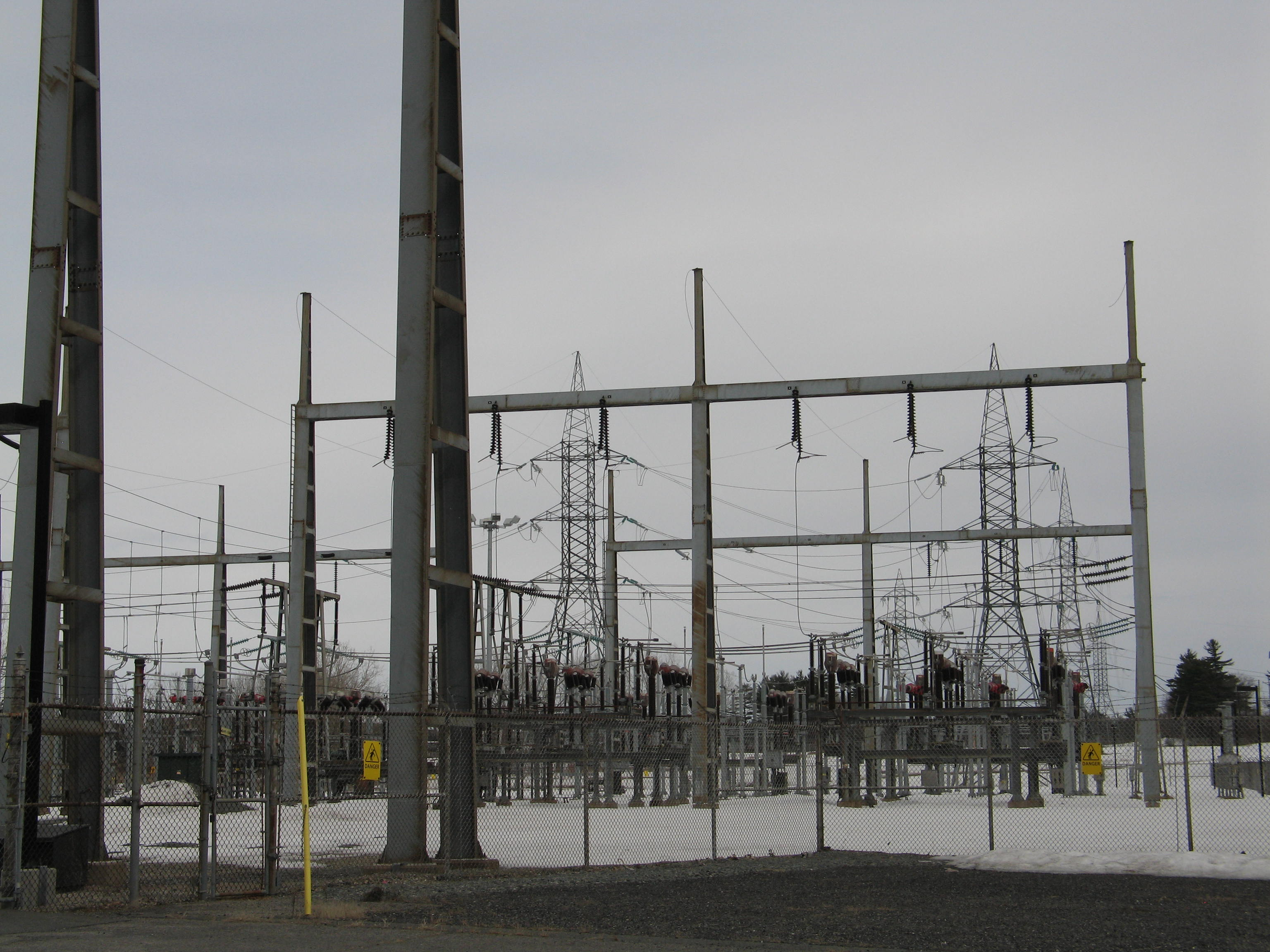
The high voltage terminal station, next to the plant.

Thermal power plants play a marginal role in Hydro-Québec's system, which is dominated by hydropower. In 2009, non-nuclear thermal generation accounted for 4.4% of nameplate capacity but only generated 446 GWh, 0.3% of total energy production. More expensive to run and more polluting than hydroelectric power plants, thermal plants are used to generate power during peak conditions, but most of the company's thermal plants serve remote communities not connected to the main power grid in Nunavik, on the Lower North Shore, in Haute-Mauricie and in the Magdalen Islands.

A thermal power station such as Tracy converts the energy contained in heavy fuel oil into heat, motion, and then into electrical energy. Burning fuel vaporize water and the steam expands to drive a turbine that spins the rotor of an alternator to generate electricity. Condensing water is then reused for another cycle. In the process, water is preheated six times, raising its temperature from 27 °C (80 °F) to 238 °C (460 °F), and goes through a deaerator and an economizer before entering the boiler at a temperature of 340.5 °C (645 °F), close to the boiling point under pressure.

Each boiler is 12 m (40 ft) long and 9 m (30 ft) wide at its base and rises to 55 m (180 ft), the equivalent of a 13-floor building. At the top, a 16 m (50 ft) long steam drum separates water and saturated steam. The boiler is heated by 16 burners, four in each corner, which can be retracted and tilted to control the steam temperature. The steam becomes an ideal gas at 539.4 °C (1,003 °F) and a pressure of 12.75 MPa (1,850 PSI) after being forced into the superheater. The plant boilers have been designed to be converted to coal in the event that it became a cheaper solution. Spaces for storing and handling coal were set aside in the planning phase.

At its rated power, the plant burned 159,000 litres (1,000 barrels) of heavy fuel oil per hour. Ten 200,000-barrel fuel storage tanks are located behind the plant and were supplied with fuel from the Montreal and Lévis refineries by tanker or by rail.

Each unit was designed to "hot" start within 20 or 30 minutes. A cold start can take between three and four hours. It is a delicate operation, since moving parts must be relatively uniformly warmed to prevent damage. The success of this operation involves more than 70 steps and is controlled by a sequence monitoring system to avoid missteps. Cooling off a unit after use required precautions to prevent buckling of the main shaft.

The plant was easily recognizable by its four 137-metre (449 ft) high red-and-white smokestacks. Framed with safety valves, the chimneys were only 82 m (270 ft) tall when the plant opened in the 1960s, but were raised in 1980 in response to environmental considerations. The plant's maximum annual output was limited to 2.6 TWh due to air pollution regulations.

The transmission towers near the plant is part of a 735 kV transmission line crossing the Saint Lawrence River. They are 174.6 m (573 ft) high, making them the tallest in Canada. The power station's terminal substation is linked to the power grid by four 230 kV lines to Boucherville, Varennes, Contrecoeur, Carignan (lines 2320 and 2322) and Sorel-Tracy (lines 2332 and 2336).

== Operation ==
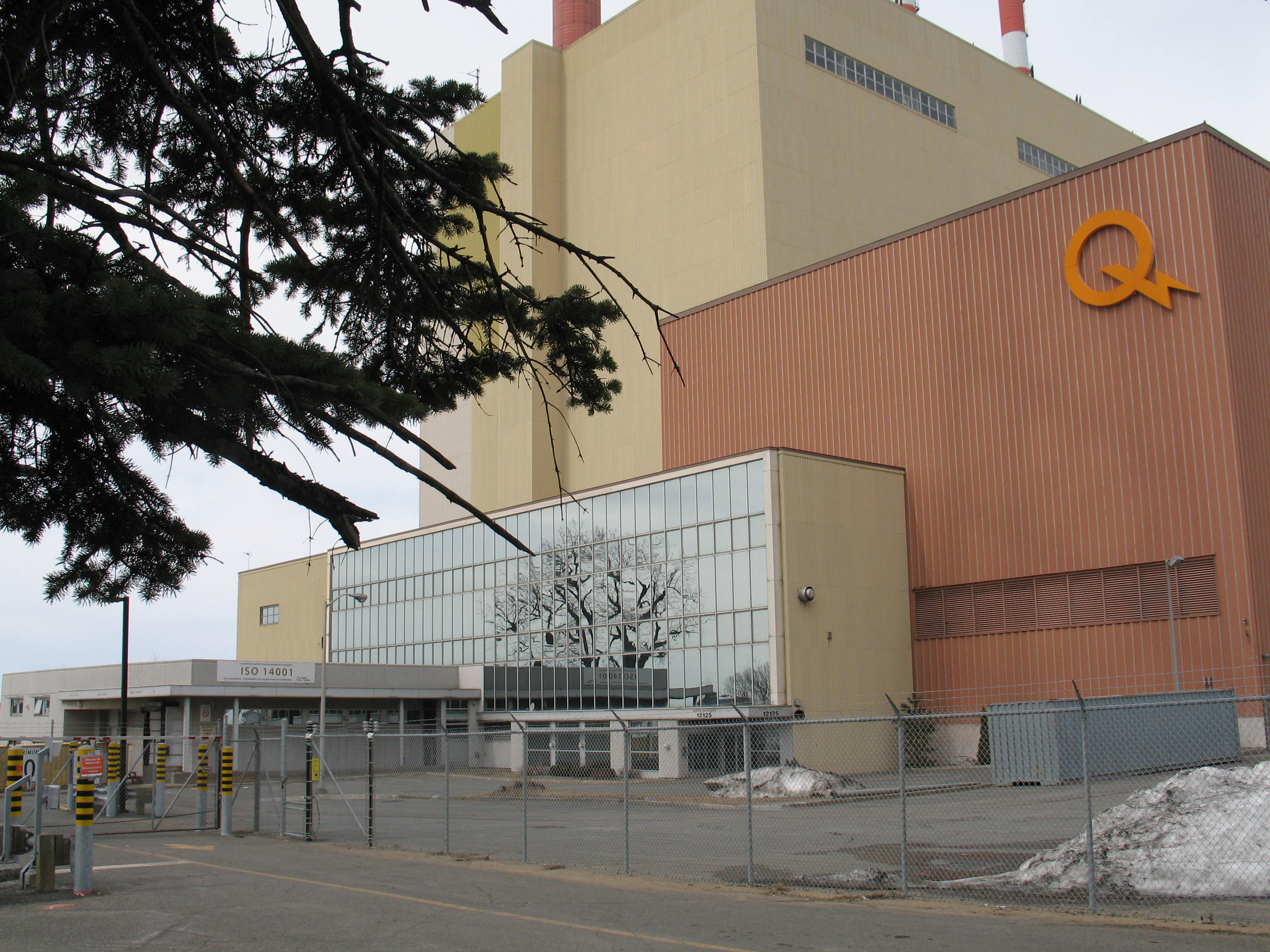
The plant's main gate.

The Tracy Thermal Generating Station was one of four peaking power plants on the Hydro-Québec grid. It was primarily used in winter to boost capacity, as required by the widespread use of electric heating in Quebec. It was also sporadically operated as a base load power plant between 1989 and 1991, in 1998 and in 2003–2004 to mitigate low water conditions in the company's reservoirs.

Since the 1980s, calls for the closure of the plant were heard each time it was run for an extended period. Nearby residents mainly complained about noise and odours from the generating station.

In December 1990, Quebec's Minister of Energy, Lise Bacon, asked Hydro-Québec to consider converting the plant to natural gas to lower sulfur dioxide emissions as well as a cost-saving measure – at the time, heavy fuel oil was sold at $C28/barrel while the equivalent natural gas was selling for C$18.

In 1992, Hydro-Québec announced a C$300 million refurbishment program to upgrade the boilers to burn natural gas or heavy fuel oil by 1995. The plant was seldom used between 1992 and 1997 and the modernization program was scaled down from C$165 to C$130 million. Retiring the plant was considered as a cost-cutting measure in the summer of 1996. Hydro-Québec decided against shutting down the plant but temporarily closed two units. Natural gas conversion was also shelved as it was "not beneficial at the moment".

=== Extended operation periods ===
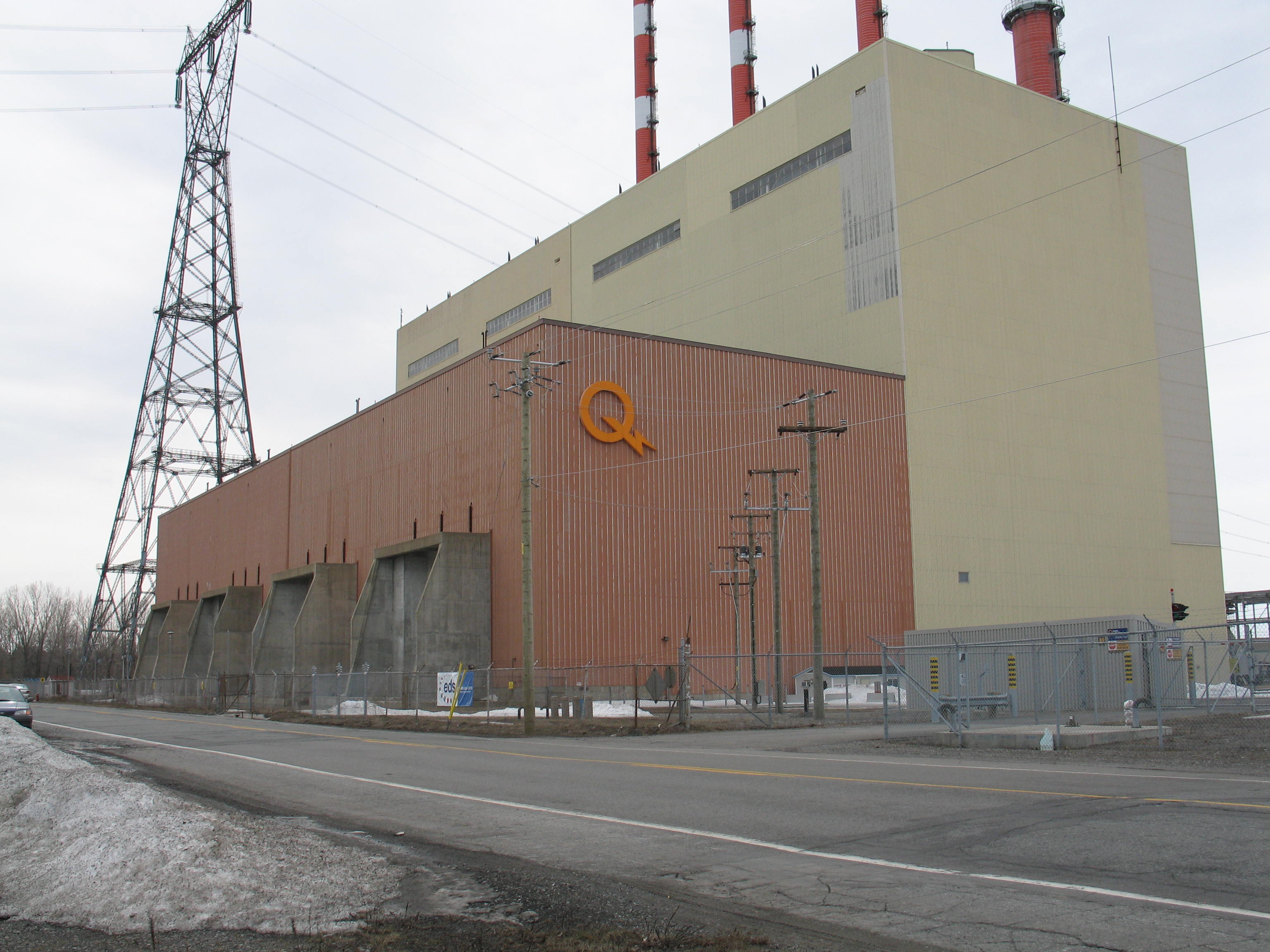
The plant was operated extensively between June 2003 and May 2004 because of a serious precipitation shortfall.

Hydro-Québec restarted the plant during the massive ice storm of January 1998. In July, the utility signed a one-year contract with the Ultramar refinery in Lévis for heavy fuel oil deliveries at $C13 per barrel, a price "never seen before", according to the company's CEO, André Caillé. Despite denials by Hydro-Québec officials, the operation of the Tracy plant was seen by many observers as evidence of low reservoir levels. A few months later, the company was forced to admit levels of its reservoirs were low.

After being idle for two years to complete repairs, the plant was run at capacity for 5 weeks, from June 14 to July 23, 2001, to take advantage of high prices on neighbouring electricity markets and cheap fuel and generated close to 200 GWh. That summer, Hydro-Québec took delivery of 480,000 barrels of heavy oil, and a 270,000-barrel load in August. When operating at full capacity, the plant consumed 20,000 bpd.

The plant's units were put back to service in mid-June 2003 in response to a further decline in reservoir levels after two years of improvement. In October, Le Devoir newspaper reported that three strategic reservoirs (Manic-5, LG-2 and Caniapiscau) reached levels described as "alarming" as of May 2003. With a runoff deficit reaching 23 TWh, the Tracy generating station ran for 11 months out of 12 in 2003. The plant had a record year, generating 1.75 TWh, beating its previous best year in 1990.

The very cold temperatures recorded in mid-January 2004 increased domestic demand to record levels and added to the supply problems, even as the thermal plant was kept running at full capacity. In four days, Hydro-Québec broke its historical peak demand four times, twice on January 15 while Montreal was freezing under −30 °C (−22 °F) weather. On that day, system demand reached 35,818 MW at 7:18 am and climbed to 36,279 MW at 5:30 pm.

The year-round use of the thermal power station fostered a strong discontent among people living nearby, who began registering complaints with the company and their elected officials. During the summer of 2003, a few people's houses and property were soiled with mysterious reddish droplets for which Hydro-Québec paid compensation, recognizing that these droplets could be related to "possible releases from the power plant."

After meeting a delegation of Sorel-Tracy citizens led by mayor Marcel Robert on March 29, 2004, company officials pledged to stop operating the plant past May 31, 2004, and limit its future use to peak periods only. The decision met both Quebec's and regional authorities demands, including the preservation of local jobs.

== Environment ==
The Tracy generating station was the only major thermal power station owned by Hydro-Québec on the main power grid in 2011 – except for three gas turbines in Bécancour, La Citière and Cadillac — and it was the utility's main source of air pollutants for most of its operational life. During the last 30 years of its operational life, the Tracy thermal generating station was faced with increasingly more stringent environmental rules. The Canada-US Agreements on acid rain, new regulations lowering the sulfur content of fuel and greenhouse gas emissions regulations gradually constrained its operational flexibility outside of peak hours.

The power station was operated 4,500 hours in 2003 and emitted 11,316 tonnes of SO_{2} and 6,284 tonnes of NO_{x}, which was above the 5,000-tonne cap for the southern Quebec Pollutant Emission Management Area (PEMA) under the 2000 Ozone Annex of the bilateral Air Quality Agreement. In 2004, the power station released 1.2 megatonnes of CO_{2}, 6,674 tonnes of SO_{2}, and 4,010 tonnes of NO_{x}. That year, the Tracy plant operated for 2,355 hours. Emissions were significantly cut in later years as it ran for 373 hours in 2005, down to only 7 hours in 2010.

The Quebec government climate change action plan increased the costs of keeping the plant open. Starting in 2007, the plant's share of the C$200 million carbon levy for industrial users of fossil fuels was evaluated at C$4.5 million. A new air quality regulation passed in 2011 lowered the NO_{x} cap to 2,100 tonnes per year and required the power station to be equipped with a selective catalytic reduction system, a C$75 million investment according to a 2010 economic assessment prepared by the Quebec Department of Sustainable Development, Environment and Wildlife.

== Retirement and dismantlement ==
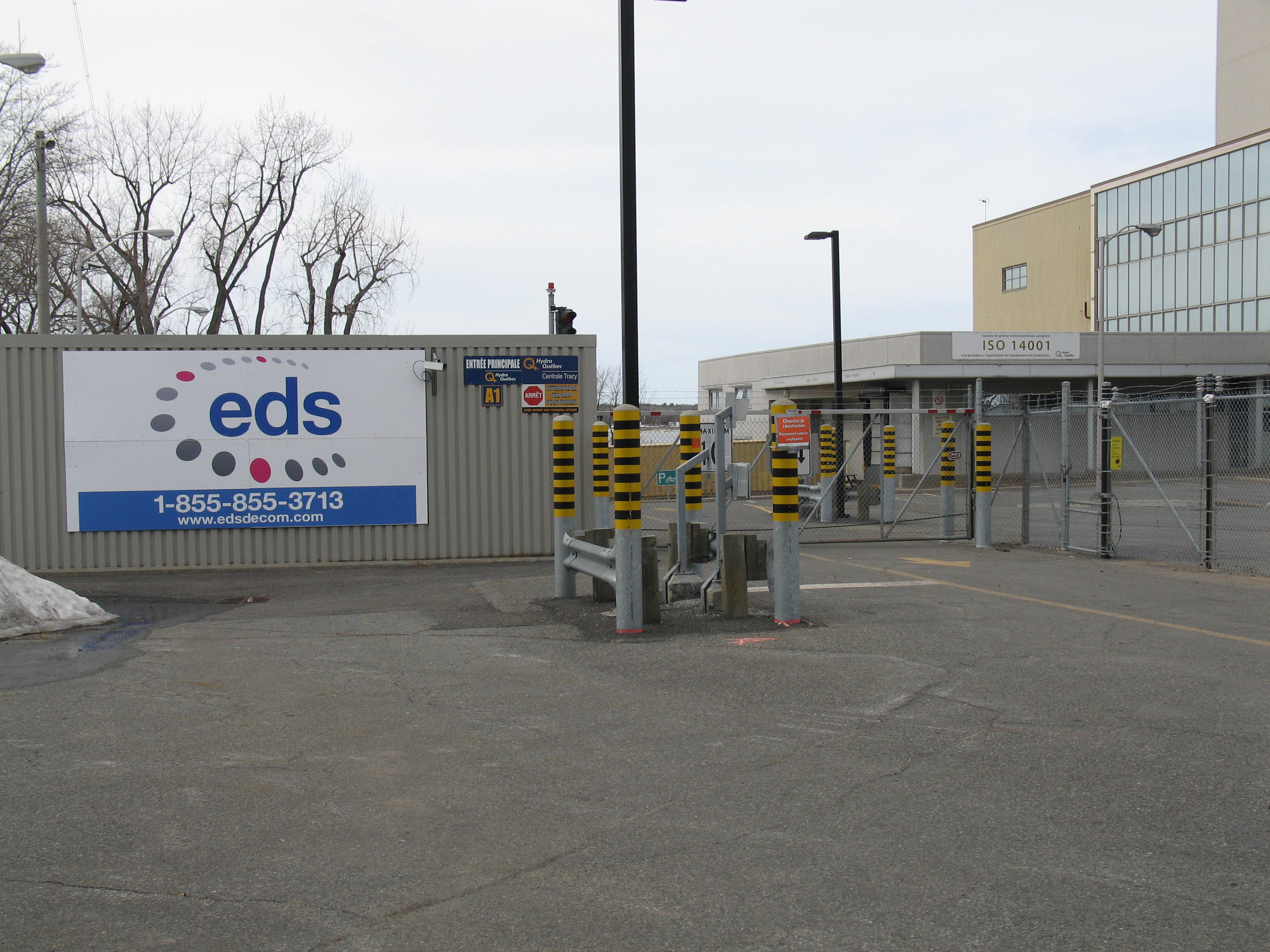
Decommissioning work at the plant has been delayed following the bankruptcy of EDS Canada, in December 2013.

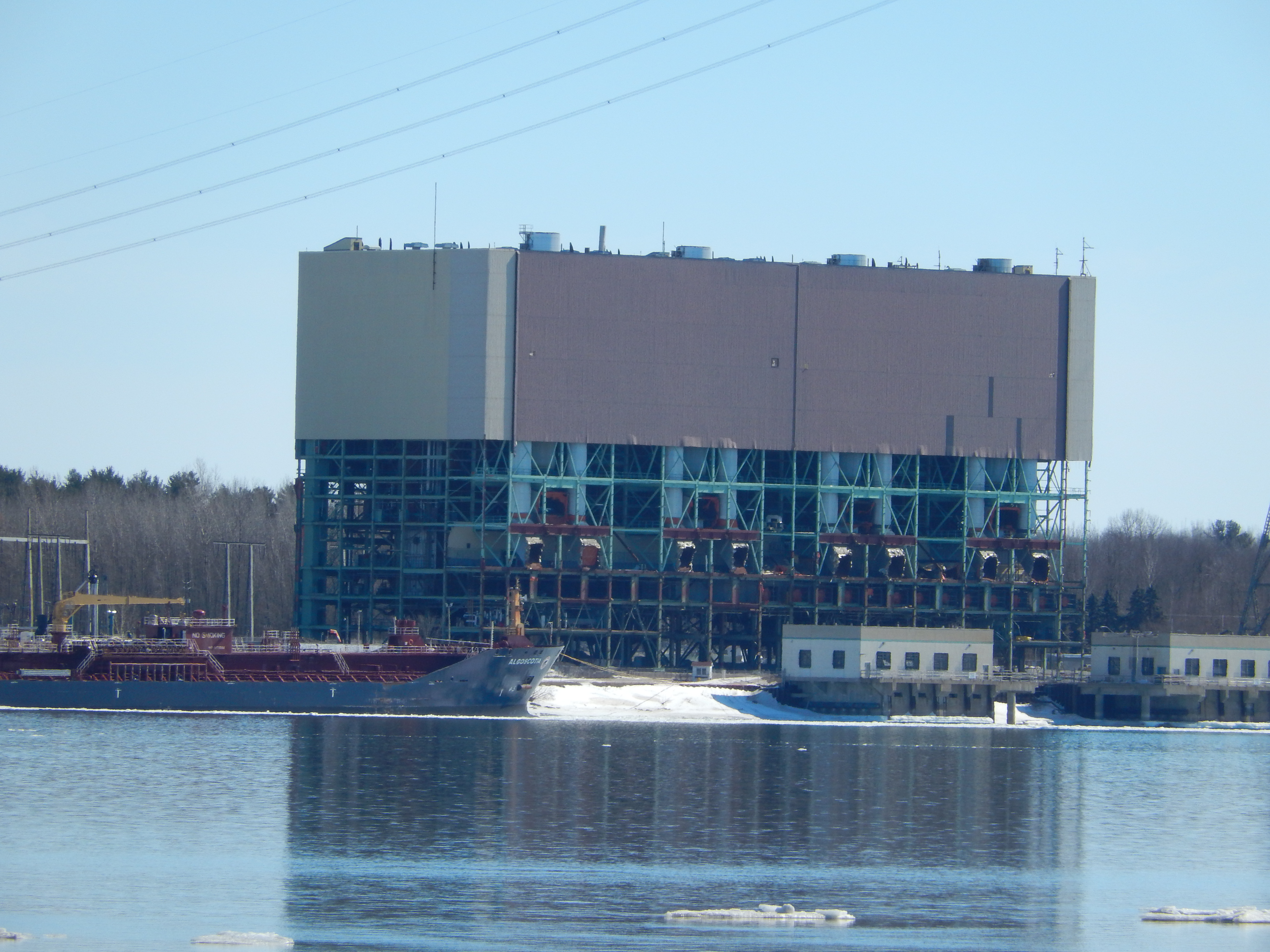
The plant, without its smokestacks, during its dismantlement in March 2015.

With the commissioning of new dams in the James Bay area, the Tracy plant ceased operations prior to the 2010–2011 winter to be kept as a reserve. It was officially retired on March 1, 2011. Dismantlement work is scheduled to begin in January 2013 and will last approximately one year. The C$19 million (£12 million) contract was awarded to US-based firm EDS Decommissioning, a subsidiary of the Silverdell Environmental Group. EDS will be in charge of decommissioning and dismantling the plant, including asbestos removal, tearing down the structures and selling reusable assets. The contractor expects to market "approximately 37,000 tonnes of reusable plant, equipment and metals" for resale.

Future use of the riverfront property owned by Hydro-Québec has not yet been finalized. At the end of 2011, the Société des traversiers du Québec expressed an interest in moving its Sorel ferry terminal at Bassin Kaskiaik to near the power station as a way to increase traffic. As of October 2012, this scenario is among five options evaluated by a consultant retained by the Quebec government.

== See also ==
- List of electrical generating stations in Quebec
- Shawinigan Water & Power Company

== Works cited ==
- Bellavance, Claude (1994). Shawinigan Water and Power (1898–1963) : Formation et déclin d'un groupe industriel au Québec [Shawinigan Water and Power (1898–1963): Formation and decline of an industrial group in Quebec] (in French). Montreal: Boréal. 446 p. ISBN 2-89052-586-4.
- Bolduc, André; Hogue, Clarence; Larouche, Daniel (1989), Hydro-Québec, l'héritage d'un siècle d'électricité (in French) (third ed.), Montreal: Libre-Expression / Forces, 341 p, ISBN 2-89111-388-8 (also available in English, under the title Hydro-Québec After 100 Years of Electricity)
- Government of Québec (May 13, 2010). Règlement sur l'assainissement de l'atmoshpère: Étude d'impact économique [Clean Air Regulation: Economic impact study] (PDF) (in French). Quebec City: Ministère du Développement durable, de l'Environnement et de la Faune. 60 p.
- Hydro-Québec (2010). Sustainability Report 2009 (PDF). Montreal: Hydro-Québec. 44 p. ISBN 978-2-550-58105-5.
- Hydro-Québec (2012). Annual Report 2011 (PDF). Montreal: Hydro-Québec. 116 p. ISBN 978-2-550-63872-8. ISSN 0702-6706.
- Paradis, Paul (1965). Tracy Thermal Generating Station. Montreal: Hydro-Québec. 32 p. OCLC 77448028.
