= Vivian Burrill =

Irish-born Quebecois politician

Vivian Burrill (1854-1937) was a local politician in Shawinigan, Quebec. He was the first mayor of Shawinigan.

He was born in 1854 in Ireland and moved to Canada in 1872.

Burrill sat on the city council from 1901 to 1913 and served as mayor of the city from 1901 to 1902 and from 1908 to 1913.

He was in office when the first public infrastructures were laid out, including the first bridge to link Shawinigan and Shawinigan-Sud and a local plant owned by Northern Aluminum Co. claimed the first production of aluminum in Canadian history.

Burrill moved to nearby Trois-Rivières in 1914 and died in 1937.

Rue Burrill (Burrill Street), where Industrial Park #1 is located, was named to honour him.

== See also ==
- Mayors of Shawinigan
- Mauricie
- Shawinigan, Quebec

Political offices
Preceded by none	Mayors of Shawinigan; 1901–1902	Succeeded by Arthur Dufresne
Preceded by Beaudry Leman	Mayors of Shawinigan; 1908–1913	Succeeded by Joseph-Auguste Frigon
