= Hugh McMillan =

Hugh McMillan may refer to:

- Hugh McMillan (politician) (1839–1895), 19th century Quebec MP
- Hugh McMillan (musician), Canadian rock/folk musician
- Hugh McMillan (poet) (born 1955), Scottish poet and writer

== See also ==
- Hugh Macmillan (disambiguation)
