= Burrill with Cowling =

Civil parish in North Yorkshire, England

Coordinates: 54.279°N 1.630°W

- Location within North Yorkshire
- Population: 104 (2011 census)
- OS grid reference: SE2408887120
- Civil parish: Burrill with Cowling
- Unitary authority: North Yorkshire
- Ceremonial county: North Yorkshire
- Region: Yorkshire and the Humber
- Country: England
- Sovereign state: United Kingdom
- Post town: Bedale
- Postcode district: DL8
- Police: North Yorkshire
- Fire: North Yorkshire
- Ambulance: Yorkshire
- UK Parliament: Thirsk and Malton

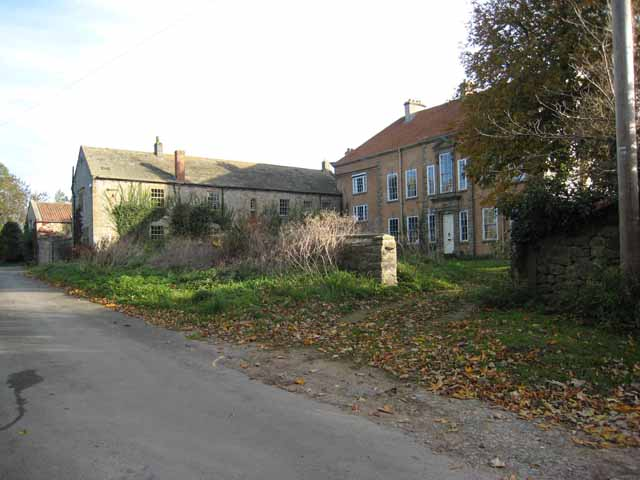
Cowling Hall

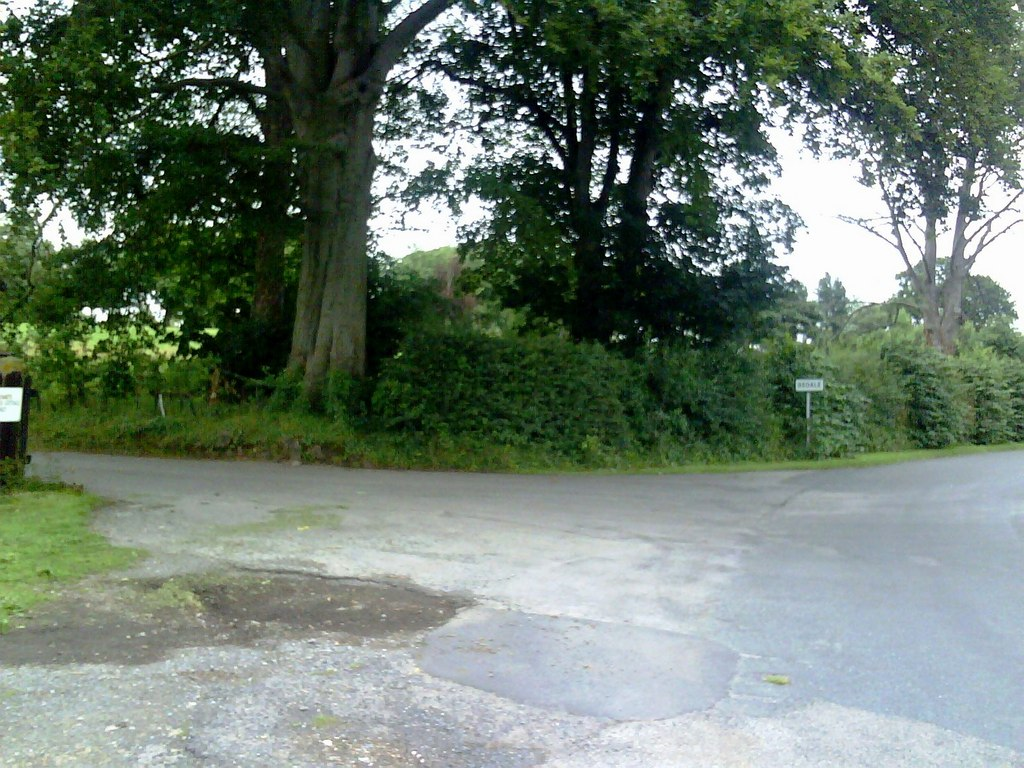
Junction on Burrill Road, North Yorkshire

Burrill with Cowling is a civil parish in the county of North Yorkshire, England, including the villages of Burrill and Cowling. It is only a 5-minute walk between the 2 small villages, which are 1 mile west of Bedale. It is a small parish surrounded by sparsely populated countryside and contains mainly detached and semi-detached houses. The closest city is Ripon 17 miles (27 km) and it is 234 miles from London. Burrill with Cowling is accessible by road from the A1(M) 3.1 miles to the east and the nearest railway station is 15 miles away in Northallerton. From 1974 to 2023 it was part of the Hambleton District, it is now administered by the unitary North Yorkshire Council.

In 1870/72 John Marius Wilson described Burrill with Cowling as:

"A township in Bedale parish, N. R. Yorkshire; 1¾ mile SW of Bedale. It has a post office, of the name of Burrell, under Bedale. Acres, 463. Real property, £1,415. Pop., 111. Houses, 25."

== Demographics ==
According to the 2011 census Burrill with Cowling is a small parish with a population of 104 and only 50 households. The average age of the population is 47.6. Most of the inhabitants are of working age, with the highest percentage (33.7%) being in the 45–59 age range. The second-biggest age group is 60+, with 32 people (30.1%), mirroring the ageing population in the country. The smallest age group was 15- to 19-year-olds with only 3 people. Although the population has fluctuated slightly there has been little change since 1881, when the population was 100.

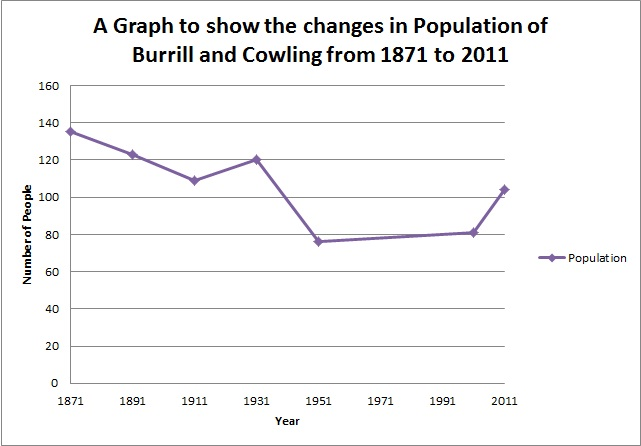
Population time series 1871–2011

== Economy and industry ==
In the 1800s Burrill with Cowling's main employment was agriculture, with 25 inhabitants working in farming in 1881. Agriculture is still the main employer, with 16.1% of all industry (10 people employed in this sector) and manufacturing being the second-largest employer with 8 people, whilst the two smallest sectors are 'Financial and Insurance Activities' and 'Information and Communication', both with 1.6% of the total number of employed. As of 2011 there were 84 people of working age with 60 of these being economically active, 2 students and 14 retired.

== Listed buildings ==
Burrill with Cowling contains a handful of listed buildings; Ivy Cottage (Grade II listed on 22 August 1966), Manor House (Grade II listed on 5 May 1952) and most notably Cowling Hall. Cowling Hall is a Grade I listed building (22 August 1966) on Cowling Lane, Burrill, DL8 1RR. The Hall is currently owned by the village and is run by a group of volunteers whilst being entirely self-funded, having opened on 1 December 2012 to be used for classes, youth clubs and social groups. It was in 1985 that the land the Hall now stands on was purchased with the aim of building 'The Cowling Liberal Club and Institute'. It contained a reading room and library and was used for political and social gatherings. It has gone through many changes – mainly housing the 'Cowling Women's' Liberal Association'. In 1939 membership of the club was declining therefore to keep the Hall open it was offered to the Cowling Parish Council as a gift and was opened as the Cowling Village Institute, but since 1971 it has been renamed Cowling Village Hall.

== Housing ==
In 2011 there were 50 households in Burrill with Cowling (the highest since records began in 1901), 64% in detached and in 30% semi-detached homes. The average number of people per household is 2.1 and the average number of rooms per house is 7.3 (bedrooms 3.4). The average house price in Hambleton is £237,659 (with the average detached house selling for £306,397), only about £1,000 below the national average for the UK but still approximately £80,000 more than the region it lies in – Yorks and Humber - where the average is £157,157.

== Geography and climate ==
Burrill with Cowling is in the North of England in the county North Yorkshire and is located between two national parks – Yorkshire Dales National Park and North York Moors National Park. It is 32.2 miles from Middlesbrough and 41 miles from York (41 miles). Land in the North East slopes west to east therefore rivers flow eastwards, mainly from sources in the Pennines which are part of the Yorkshire Dales National Park. The average temperature for Burrill with Cowling is approximately 9.7 °C (31.1 °F, slightly lower than the UK average of 10.4 °C (51 °F).

Climate data for Burrill with Cowling, England (Yearly Average)
Month	Jan	Feb	Mar	Apr	May	Jun	Jul	Aug	Sep	Oct	Nov	Dec	Year
Mean daily maximum °F (°C)	44.24 (6.80)	45.68 (7.60)	50.9 (10.5)	55.58 (13.10)	60.98 (16.10)	65.66 (18.70)	68.72 (20.40)	68.54 (20.30)	64.76 (18.20)	57.02 (13.90)	49.46 (9.70)	43.16 (6.20)	56.23 (13.46)
Mean daily minimum °F (°C)	35.96 (2.20)	35.24 (1.80)	36.5 (2.5)	38.84 (3.80)	44.06 (6.70)	49.46 (9.70)	52.7 (11.5)	52.52 (11.40)	49.82 (9.90)	44.6 (7.0)	39.74 (4.30)	34.52 (1.40)	42.83 (6.02)
Source: "Climatological Information for Burrill with Cowling, England",
