= Royal Commission on Banking and Currency =

- Also known as: Macmillan Commission
- Commissioners: Hugh Macmillan, Baron Macmillan (Chair); Charles Stewart Addis; William Thomas White; John Edward Brownlee; Beaudry Leman
- Inquiry period: 31 July 1933 – 1933
- Authorized: Order in Council P.C. 1562

The Royal Commission on Banking and Currency (also known as the Macmillan Commission) was a 1933 Canadian royal commission tasked with reviewing the Canadian government's involvement in monetary policy. Chaired by Scottish jurist Hugh Macmillan, it also included Bank of England director Sir Charles Addis, former Canadian Finance Minister William Thomas White, Banque Canadienne de Montreal general manager Beaudry Leman, and Premier of Alberta John Edward Brownlee. The Order in Council creating the commission was issued July 31, 1933, and the first meeting was held in Ottawa August 8. Meetings across the country followed until the commission completed its hearings in Ottawa on September 15.

The commission's two major recommendations were the establishment of a Canadian central bank (passed by a 3–2 margin with White and Leman in opposition) and the establishment of an inquiry "to investigate the existing organizations for the provision of rural credit with a view to the preparation of a scheme for the consideration of Parliament" (passed unanimously).
