= Burrill =

Village in North Yorkshire, England

Coordinates: 54.279800°N 1.632700°W

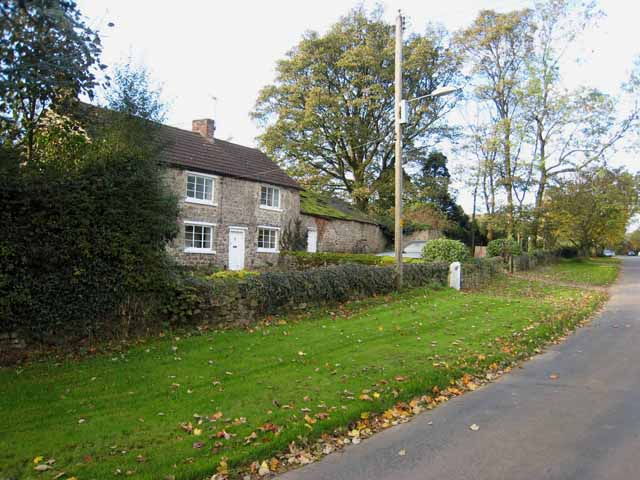
- Cottage at Burrill

- Location within North Yorkshire
- OS grid reference: SE240872
- Civil parish: Burrill with Cowling
- Unitary authority: North Yorkshire
- Ceremonial county: North Yorkshire
- Region: Yorkshire and the Humber
- Country: England
- Sovereign state: United Kingdom
- Post town: Bedale
- Postcode district: DL8
- Police: North Yorkshire
- Fire: North Yorkshire
- Ambulance: Yorkshire
- UK Parliament: Thirsk and Malton

Burrill is a small village in near to Bedale in North Yorkshire, England. It is in the parish of Burrill with Cowling and 1 mile (1.6 km) west of Bedale.

== See also ==
- Listed buildings in Burrill with Cowling
