= Hugh Macmillan (minister) =

Christian minister and author

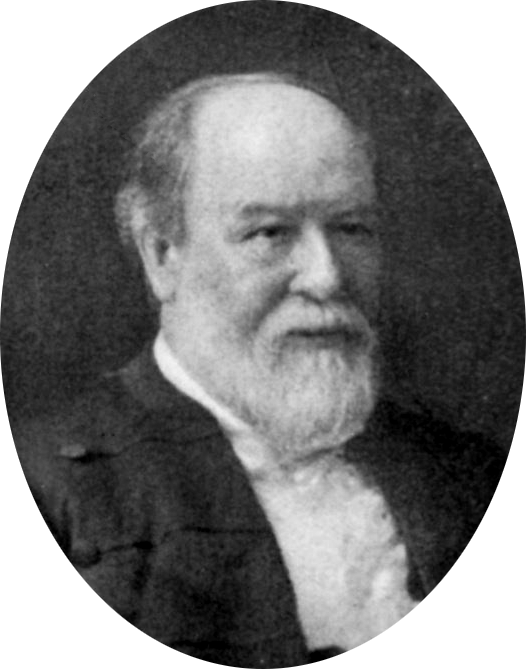
- Hugh Macmillan of Greenock

Personal details
- Born: 17 September 1833
- Died: 24 May 1903 (aged 69)

Hugh Macmillan FRSE FSA (1833–1903) was a Scottish minister of the Free Church of Scotland who served as their Moderator of the General Assembly in 1897. He was a prolific author on theological subjects and the relationship between God and Nature. His most popular book Bible Teachings in Nature ran to 15 editions in both UK and USA and translated into several languages.

== Life ==
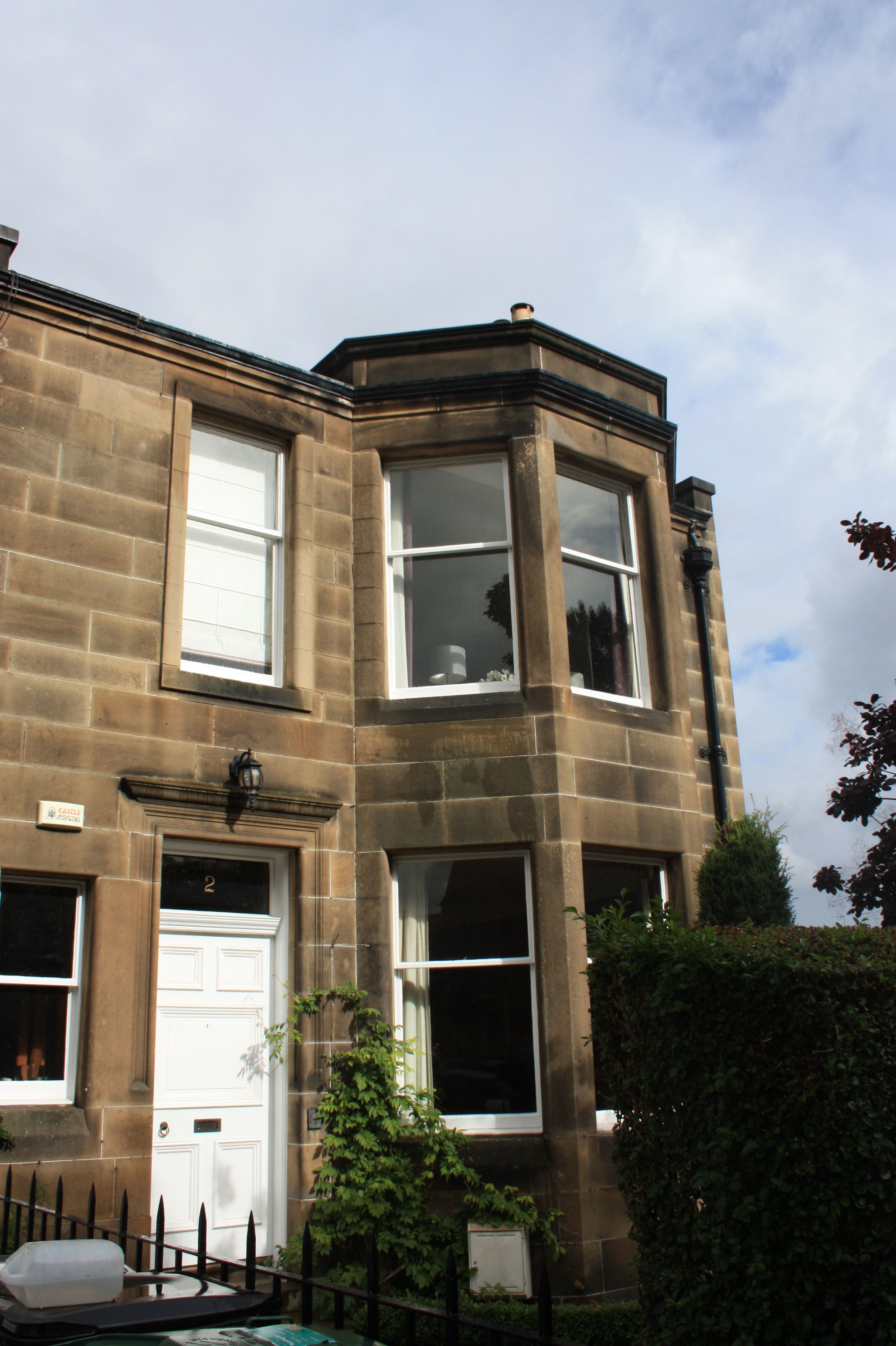
2 Murrayfield Road, Edinburgh

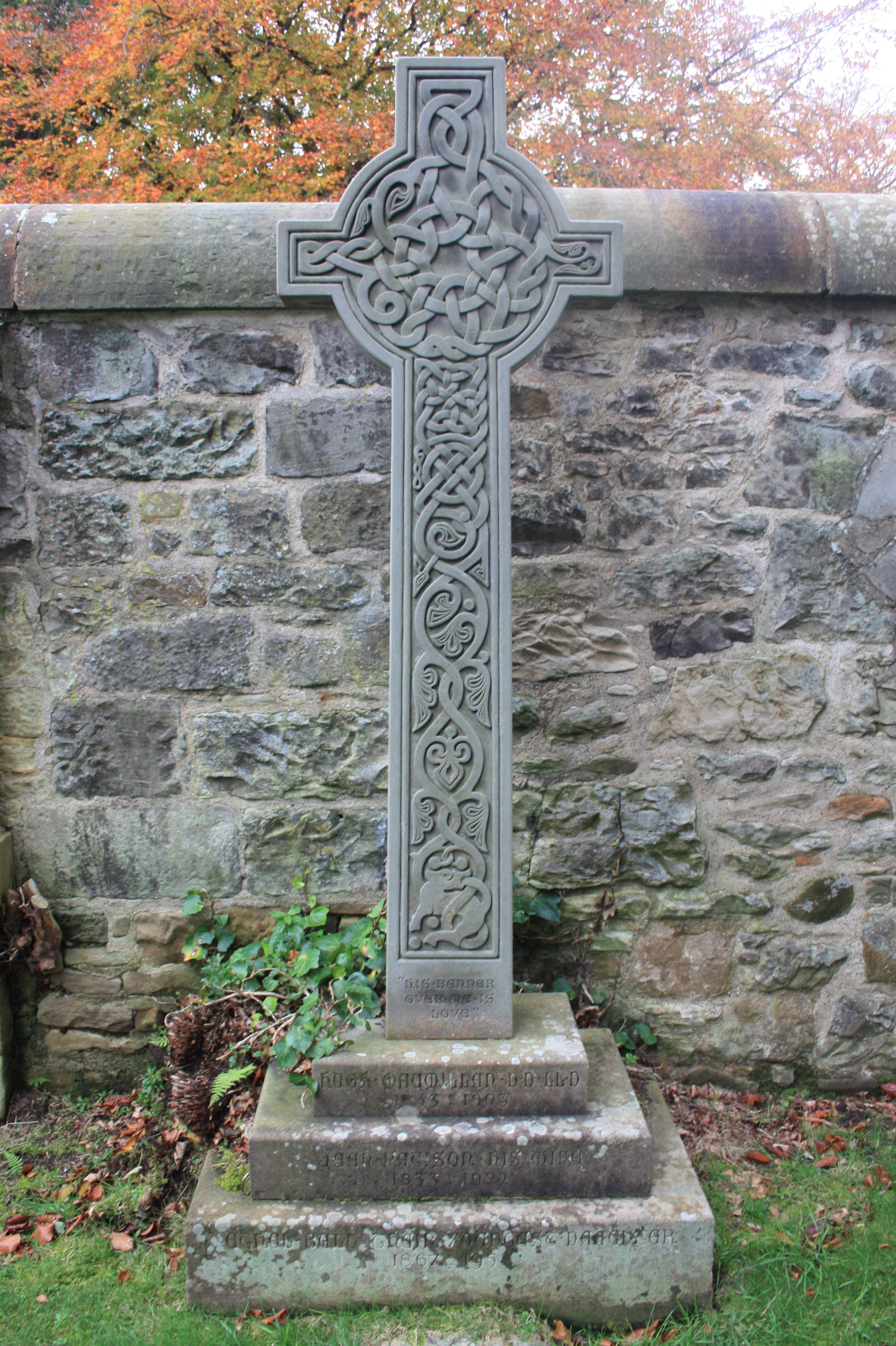
The grave of Rev Hugh Macmillan, Dean Cemetery, Edinburgh

He was born on 17 September 1833 in Aberfeldy the eldest of nine children of Margaret (née Macfarlane) and Alexander Macmillan, a merchant. He attended school in Aberfeldy then Hill Street Academy in Edinburgh. He began an arts degree then medicine at the University of Edinburgh, dropping out when he decided instead to train for the Free Church of Scotland, which had been created in 1843. He trained at New College, Edinburgh.

He was licensed to preach in January 1857 and began his ministry at the Free Church in Breadalbane. In 1859 he moved to Kirkmichael Church in Perthshire. In 1864 he moved to the Free Church of St Peter in Glasgow, a far larger charge. In 1878 he moved again to the Free Church in Greenock.

In 1871 the University of St Andrews awarded him an honorary doctorate (LLD) for his writing. In 1872 he was elected a Fellow of the Royal Society of Edinburgh, his proposer being John Hutton Balfour. The University of Edinburgh awarded him an honorary doctorate (DD) in 1879 and the University of Glasgow gave a second DD in 1883 and made a Fellow of the Scottish Society of Antiquaries in the same year.

In 1886 he delivered the Thomson Lecture at the Free Church College in Aberdeen. In 1894 he delivered the Cunningham Lecture at New College, Edinburgh. In 1897 he gave the Gunning Lecture at the University of Edinburgh. In the same year he was elected Moderator of the General Assembly to the Free Church of Scotland, the highest accolade in his church. He was invited to the Diamond Jubilee celebrations of Queen Victoria in London in this capacity. The Queen is said to have greatly admired his books. He was succeeded in his role as Moderator by Rev Alexander Whyte.

He lived his final years of ministry at 70 Union Street in Greenock. In 1892 he jointly founded the Clan MacMillan Society and served as its Chief 1892 to 1896. He retired in 1901. He died at home, 2 Murrayfield Road in West Edinburgh on 24 May 1903 and is buried in Dean Cemetery. The grave lies in the first northern extension, on its southern wall, backing onto the original cemetery.

== Family ==
In 1859 he married Jane Pattison (1833–1922), second daughter of William Pattison of Williamfield. Their children included Hugh, who later became Baron Macmillan, a law lord, and five daughters.

== Publications ==
- Footnotes from the Pages of Nature (1861)
- Bible Teachings in Nature (1867)
- Holidays on High Lands in Search of Alpine Plants (1869)
- The Ministry of Nature (1871)
- The Garden and the City (1872)
- Sun Glints in the Wilderness (1872)
- First Forms of Vegetation (1874)
- Our Lord’s Three Raisings from the Dead (1876)
- The Sabbath of the Fields (1876)
- Two Worlds are Ours (1880)
- The Marriage in Cana of Galilee (1882)
- The True Vine (1883)
- The Riviera (1885)
- The Olive Leaf (1886)
- Roman Mosaics, or Studies in Rome (1888)
- The Gate Beautiful (1891)
- My Comfort in Sorrow (1891)
- The Mystery of Grace (1893)
- The Daisies of Nazareth (1894)
- The Clock of Nature (1896)
- The Spring of Day (1898)
- Gleanings in Holy Fields (1899)
- The Corn of Heaven (1901)
- The Highland Tay from Tyndrum to Dunkeld (1901)
- The Christmas Rose (1901)
- The Poetry of Plants (1902)
- George Frederick Watts RA (1903- posthumously)
- The Touch of God (1903- posthumously)
- Rothiemurchus (1907- posthumously)
- The Isles and the Gospel (1907- posthumously)
