= Joseph-Auguste Frigon =

Canadian politician (1870–1944)

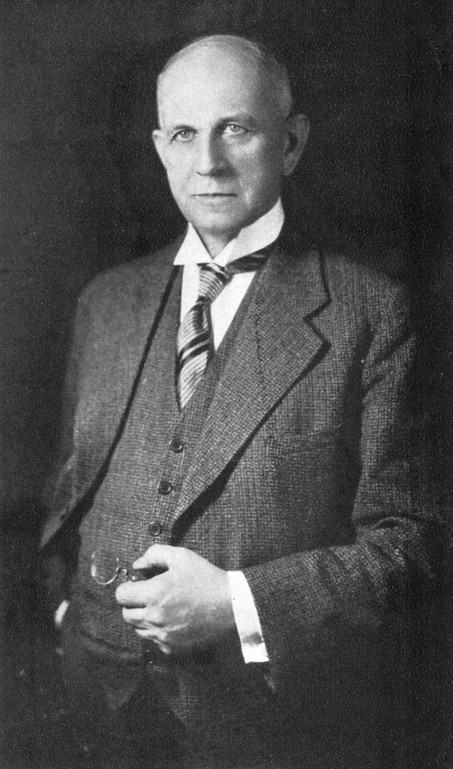
J. Auguste Frigon as M.P.P. for Saint-Maurice

Joseph-Auguste Frigon (7 February 1870 – 14 February 1944) was a local entrepreneur and politician in the Mauricie area. He served as the fourth Mayor of Shawinigan, Quebec and as Member of the Legislative Assembly.

== Early life ==
He was born in 1870 in Saint-Prosper, Mauricie, Quebec.

== Municipal Politics ==
Frigon was Mayor of Saint-Narcisse, Quebec from 1896 to 1899.

He moved to Shawinigan in the early 1900s for business reasons and ran for Mayor of that city against Beaudry Leman in 1902 but lost the election by a single ballot.

Frigon ran again in 1913 and won. He was defeated by Edmond Thibaudeau in 1915, but was re-elected in 1917.

== Provincial Politics ==
In 1927, Frigon became the Liberal Member of the Legislative Assembly for the district of Saint-Maurice. He was re-elected in 1931, but was defeated by Marc Trudel in 1935.

== Federal Politics ==
Frigon also unsuccessfully ran as an Independent Liberal candidate in the federal district of Saint-Maurice—Laflèche in 1940. Incumbent Joseph-Alphida Crête was re-elected.

== After Retirement ==
Frigon died in Shawinigan in 1944.

== Legacy ==
Rue Frigon (Frigon Street) in Shawinigan was named to honour him.

== See also ==
- Mayors of Shawinigan
- Mauricie
- Saint-Maurice Legislators
- Saint-Maurice Provincial Electoral District
- Shawinigan, Quebec

Political offices
Preceded by Vivian Burill	Mayors of Shawinigan; 1913–1915	Succeeded by Edmond Thibaudeau
Preceded by Edmond Thibaudeau	Mayors of Shawinigan; 1917–1918	Succeeded by Napoléon Désaulniers
National Assembly of Quebec
Preceded by Alphonse-Edgar Guillemette (Liberal)	MLA, District of Saint-Maurice; 1927–1935	Succeeded by Marc Trudel (ALN)
