= Cowling Hall =

Historic building in Cowling, North Yorkshire, England

Coordinates: 54°17′04″N 1°38′12″W

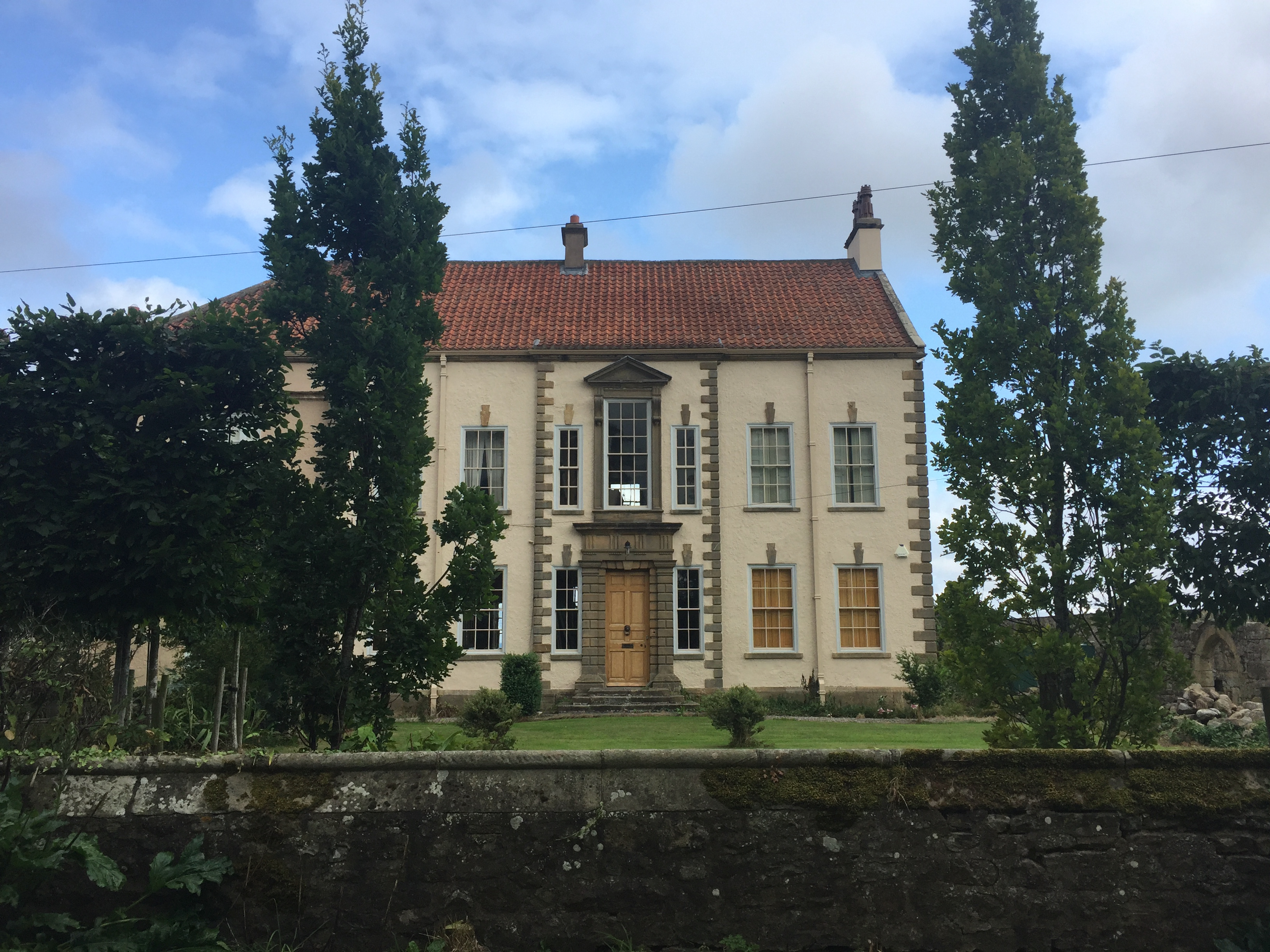
Cowling Hall 2018 West Side

Cowling Hall is a historic building in Cowling, a village near Bedale in North Yorkshire, in England.

== History ==
The oldest part of the building was probably constructed as a peel tower in the 12th century. It was extended around 1450 to form a manor house, with the old section as one of two wings. The old wing was altered in the 17th century. The great hall and one of the wings were demolished in 1700, and replaced by a rectangular house in the Queen Anne style. At the time, the house was owned by Henry Raper.

In the 17th-century, Cowling Hall belonged to the Jackson family. The 1625 will of Dame Honor Procter, daughter of Ralph Green (died 1599), a court musician who played the sackbut for Elizabeth I, gives some idea of life at Cowling. She lived at Cowling after her daughter Deborah married Thomas Jackson. She was interesting in medicine and distilling, owning a "stillytorie for roses", a bezoar stone, and a piece of so-called unicorn horn. Her clothes included a riding cloak, safeguard, hood, and mittens. She owned a book of Mr Smith's sermons. The pewter was marked with her and her husband's arms. For music, she had a pair of virginals and a chest of viols. She owned paintings of Will Sommers, Philip II, Elizabeth I, and Jane Shore. She bequeathed individual links from her gold chain to various family members. Bequests of clothing include a "pair of French bodies of taffeta".

During World War II, the property was used to house Canadian air personnel based at RAF Leeming. After the war, it had a variety of private owners, most notably Gresham Clacy, who cut a large peace symbol in the lawn as a protest against the noise caused by Royal Air Force aircraft. At some point, it was divided into two properties. The entire building was Grade I listed in 1966. In the 1980s it was acquired and restored by the architectural historian Ivan Hall.

== Architectural description ==
The main block is built of rendered brick on a plinth, with stone dressings, quoins, and a pantile roof with stone coping to the left and shaped kneelers. There are two storeys and five bays, and a bay to the left under the same roof with three storeys. The middle bay projects and contains a doorway with a rusticated Doric surround, pilasters on plinths, a frieze with triglyphs, and a cornice. Above it is a window with consoles, a frieze, and a triangular pediment. The doorway and windows are flanked by narrow sash windows with double keystones, and the outer bays contain wider sash windows with double keystones. The projecting wing to the left is built of stone and has a stone slate roof with stone coping. There are two storeys and six bays. The doorway has moulded jambs and a pointed arch, and above it is an arched cusped window with a transom. The other windows are sashes, some with quoined surrounds, and to the left is a sundial. Inside, there is some exposed timber framing and some 17th-century panelling in the south bedroom, as well as roof bosses in the wing, depicting a rose and the head of James I of Great Britain. The hall has some 18th-century panelling and two early staircases.

== See also ==
- Grade I listed buildings in North Yorkshire (district)
- Listed buildings in Burrill with Cowling
