= Shawinigan Water & Power Company =

Former hydroelectric companies in Canada, now part of Hydro-Québec

- Founded: 15 January 1898
- Defunct: 1963
- Fate: Acquired by Hydro-Québec
- Headquarters: 600 boulevard René-Lévesque, Montreal, Quebec

Established in 1898, the Shawinigan Water & Power Company was one of the dominant, privately owned hydroelectric companies in Canada until 1963, when it became a part of Hydro-Québec.

== History ==
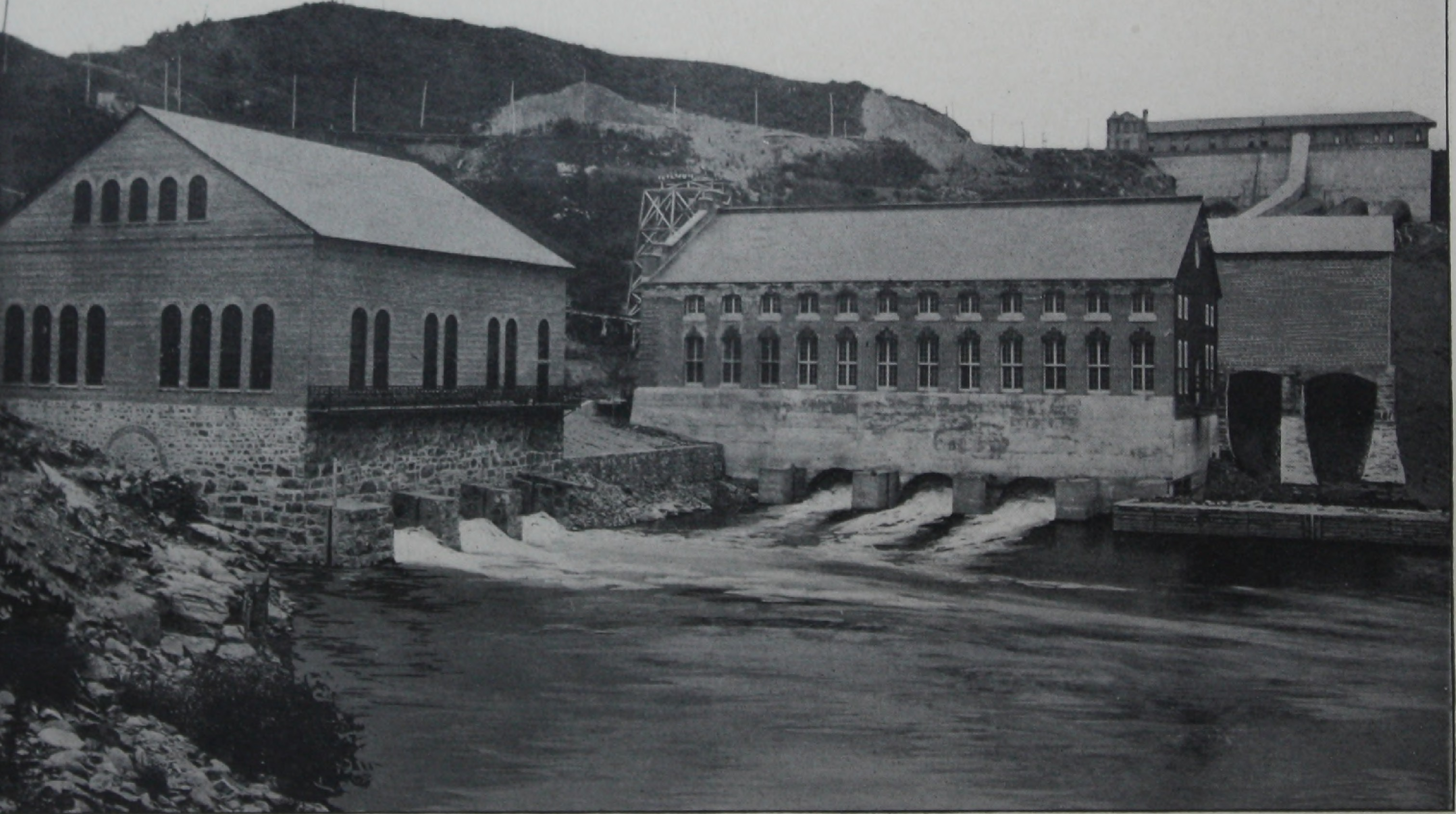

Shawinigan Water & Power Company was founded on January 15, 1898, by American businessman John Edward Aldred (who was the president) and John Joyce, and then joined by Andrew Frederick Gault, H. H. Melville, Thomas McDougall, and Louis-Joseph Forget. The company was named for where it was based: Shawinigan, Quebec.

== Power assets ==
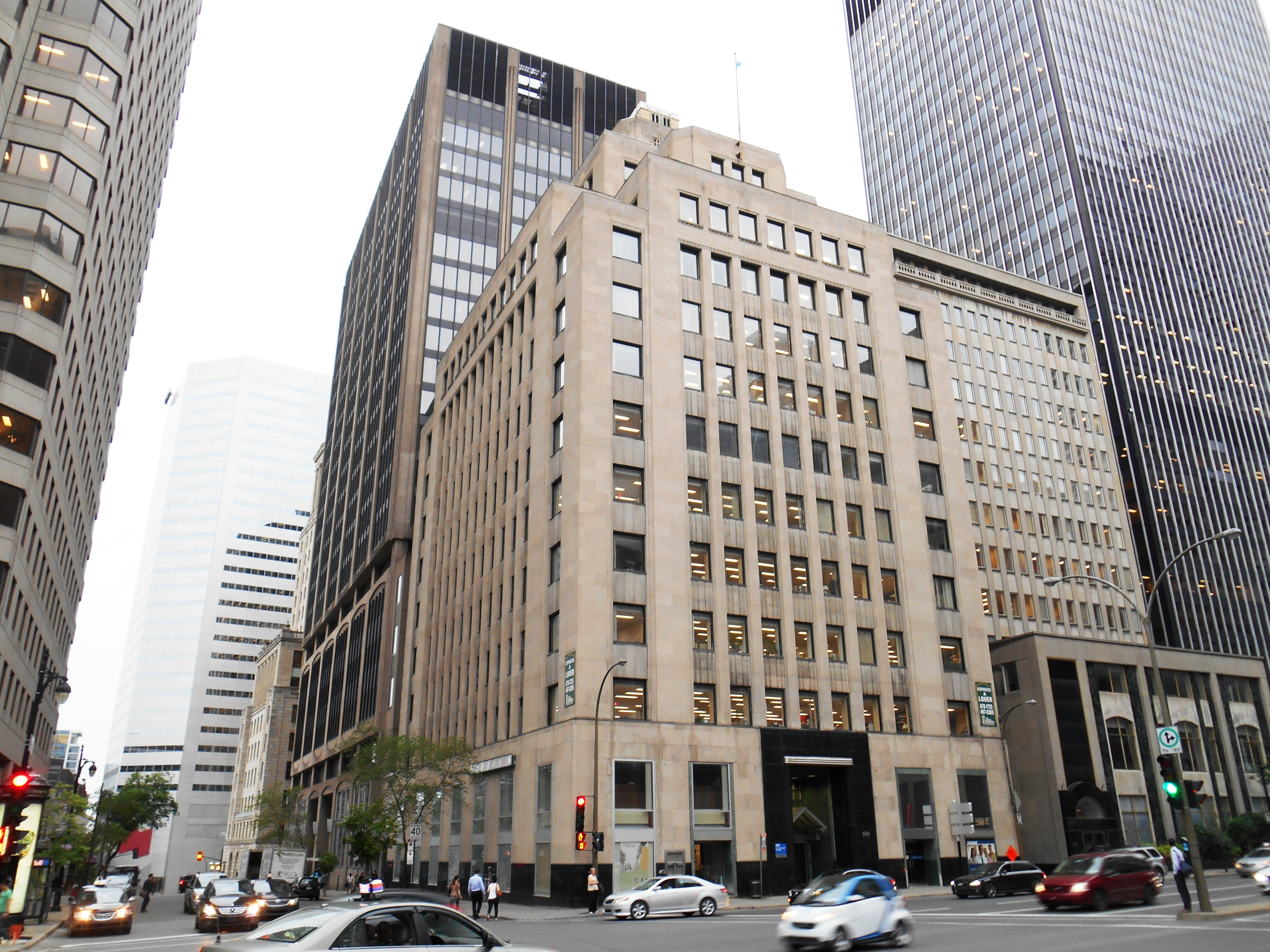
The company's 1946 headquarters at 600 René-Lévesque in Montreal, designed by Archibald & Illsley with A. Leslie Perry.

The company established various power station over the history of the company. Six power plants were built along the Saint-Maurice River in the 1920s

- Shawinigan 1 7.5MW (c. 1901) – built at what is now Shawinigan Falls. Shawinigan-1 ceased production in the early 1950s.
- Shawinigan 2 200MW (1911–1929)
- Shawinigan 3 194MW (1946–1948)
- La Gabelle 129MW (1924–1931)
- Rapide-Blanc 204MW (c. 1930)
- La Trenche 302MW (c. 1950)
- Beaumont 270MW (1958–1959)

In 1956 the company had total generating capacity at 1284 MW from the six active power stations.

Shawinigan Water & Power also generated power from two subsidiaries:

- Quebec Power Company – 31.1MW from six stations near Quebec City
- Southern Canada Power Company Limited – 43.4 MW from five stations on St. Francis River and other tributaries in the Eastern Townships

== Clients ==
- Shawinigan Carbide
- Belgo Pulp and Paper Mills

== See also ==
- History of Hydro-Québec
- Edmond Thibaudeau
- List of hydroelectric stations in Quebec
- Gouin Reservoir
- Saint-Maurice River
- Tracy Thermal Generating Station
