= Hugh Macmillan, Baron Macmillan =

British judge (1873–1952)

The Right Honourable The Lord Macmillan GCVO, PC
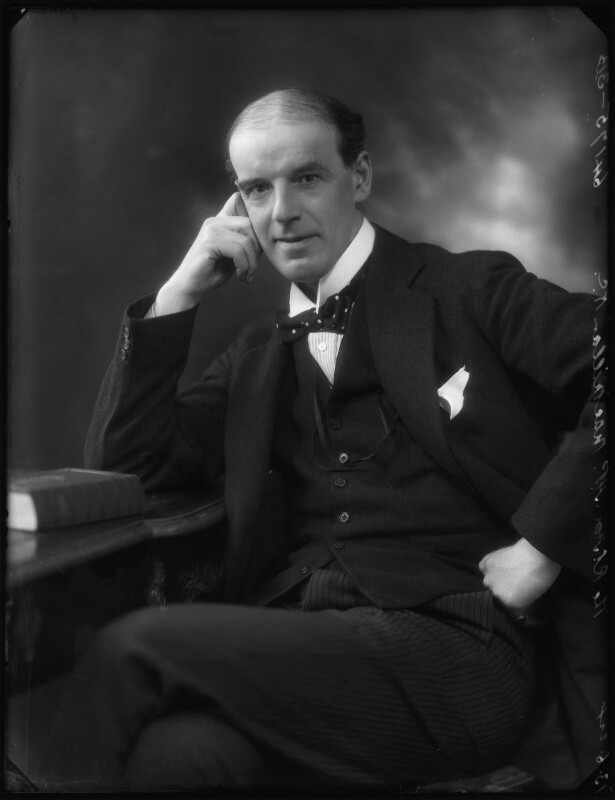
- Macmillan in 1924

Lord of Appeal in Ordinary

Minister of Information
- In office 1939–1940

Lord Advocate
- In office 1924–1924

Hugh Pattison Macmillan, Baron Macmillan, GCVO, PC (20 February 1873 – 5 September 1952) was a Scottish advocate, judge, parliamentarian and civil servant.

== Life ==
He was born in Glasgow, the son of the Rev Hugh Macmillan DD FRSE (1833-1903) and Jane Patison (1833-1922). His father was minister of St Peter's Free Church in Glasgow. The family moved to 70 Union Street in Greenock in 1878.

Hugh was educated at Collegiate School, Greenock from 1878, then studied at the University of Edinburgh (M.A. 1st class honours in philosophy, 1893 Bruce of Grangehill and Falkland Scholarship) and the University of Glasgow (LLB). He was indentured for three years to the firm Cowan, Fraser and Clapperton while he studied the Law, in which he distinguished himself by winning the Cunningham Scholarship for Conveyancing in the year 1896. He was admitted to the Faculty of Advocates in 1897 with a public defence of an assigned Thesis De diversis regulis juris antiqui, and later became King's Counsel in 1912. For a time he wrote articles on conveyancing for Green's Encyclopedia of Scots Law, and was Editor of the quarterly Juridical Review between 1900 and 1907.

During the First World War Macmillan served as assistant director of Intelligence for the Ministry of Information.

Macmillan suffered an illness, and surgery thereon, in 1917, at which time he decided to cease his nascent political career (then in abeyance for the duration of the Great War). In October 1922, he was asked by Bonar Law to become the Solicitor-General for Scotland, which he declined because of his political stripe.

In 1923 he was elected a Fellow of the Royal Society of Edinburgh. His proposers were Edward Theodore Salvesen (Lord Salvesen), William Archer Tait, Robert Blyth Greig and Sir Edmund Taylor Whittaker. He resigned from the Society in 1931.

When the Labour government of Ramsay MacDonald was elected in 1924 – the first time the Labour Party had taken power – it had no KCs in Scotland amongst its parliamentary representation. Macdonald therefore turned to Macmillan, whose reputation at the Bar was considerable, to take the job of Lord Advocate, even though he was a Conservative. He served as Lord Advocate from February to November 1924, and was sworn of the Privy Council on 16 April that year.

Macmillan was standing counsel for a vast array of clients, that included the Dominion of Canada from 1928, and for the Commonwealth of Australia from 1929. He chaired in 1924 the Royal Commission on Lunacy and Mental Health, in 1929 the Committee on Finance and Industry, and in 1932 the Committee on Income Tax Codification.

On 3 February 1930, he was appointed to replace Lord Sumner as a Lord of Appeal in Ordinary, and was simultaneously created a life peer as Baron Macmillan of Aberfeldy in the County of Perth, one of few men to have been appointed a judge in the House of Lords straight from the Bar. Macmillan sat as a Law Lord until 1947 except for a brief period at the outbreak of Second World War when he was Minister of Information. However he came in for much criticism in this role and was soon replaced. The Ministry of Information was located in the Senate House, University of London, and the Macmillan Hall there is named after him.

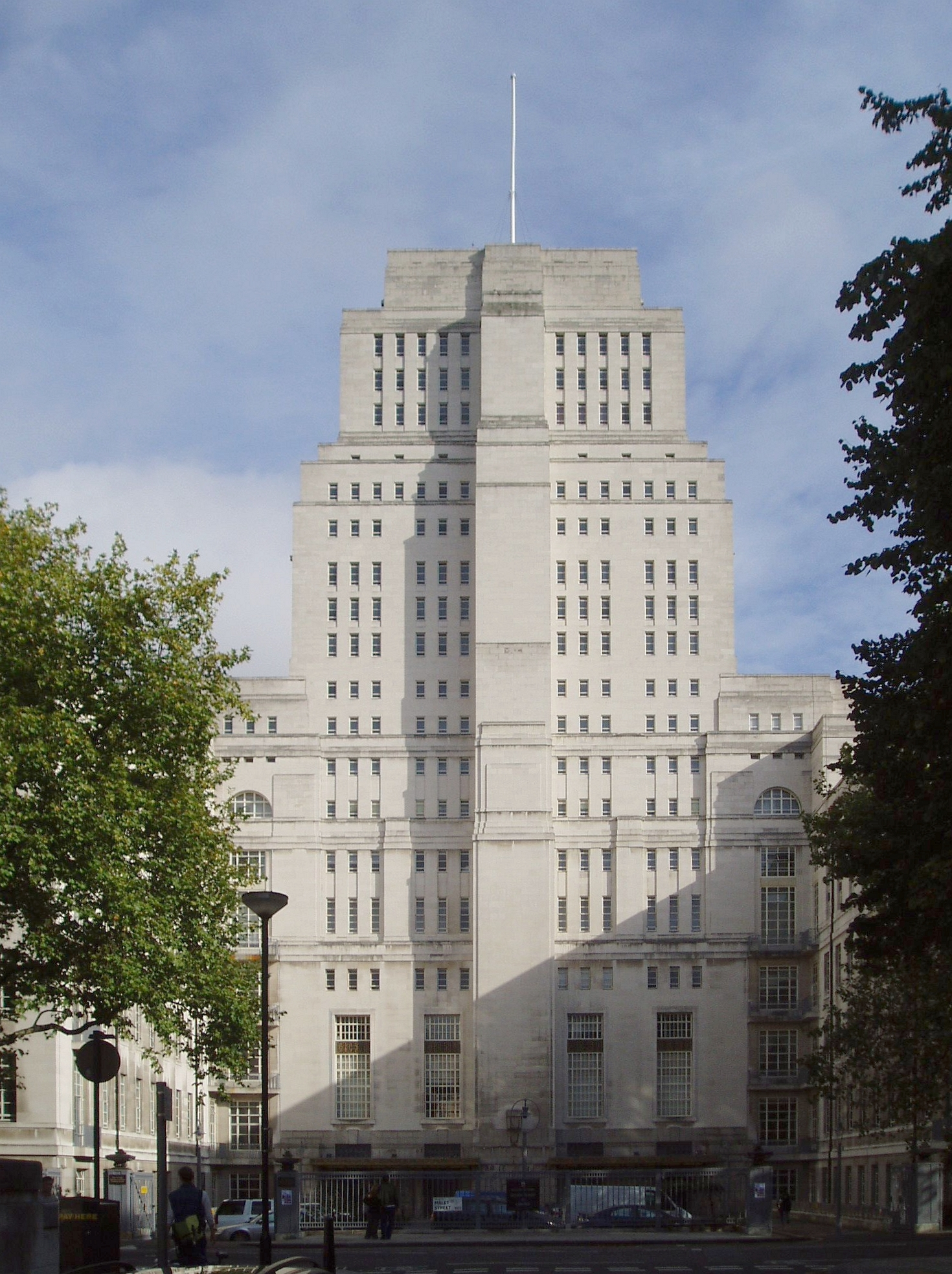
Senate House, home to the University of London's administration offices and library, is the result of a commission to Charles Holden by the Court chaired by Macmillan.

Macmillan produced some 152 judgments in the House of Lords, and some 77 in the Judicial Committee of the Privy Council.

He held a number of chairmanships, including the Committee on Finance and Industry in 1929–31, the Canadian Royal Commission on Banking and Currency in 1933, the Pilgrim Trust from 1935 to 1952, the Political Honours Committee from 1935 to 1952, the Court of the University of London from 1929 to 1943, and the BBC Advisory Council from 1936 to 1946. He was a member of the Wytham Abbey Trust, founded by Colonel Raymond ffennell. He was elected Trustee of the British Museum, and was in 1934 principal proponent and founder of the Stair Society, which was designed "to encourage the study and advance the knowledge of the history of Scots Law by the publication of original documents and by the reprinting and editing of works of sufficient rarity or importance."

Macmillan led, over the course of a decade to 7 August 1925, the effort to create the National Library of Scotland; the Committee which he chaired was noticed by Alexander Grant, head of McVitie and Price biscuit makers, who donated the bulk of the endowment This happy event culminated with the passage at Westminster of the National Library of Scotland Act 1925 (15 & 16 Geo. 5. c. 73).

He provided the 1934 Rede Lecture at Cambridge, the 1934 Maudsley Lecture, the 1935 Henry Sidgwick Memorial Lecture, and in 1936 a Broadcast National Lecture. These were bound as Law and Other Things. He was appointed in 1941 to the Professorship of Law at the Royal Academy of Arts, and was chosen an Honorary Member by the American Academy of Arts and Sciences. In 1948 he became an Honorary Fellow of the Royal Institute of British Architects. He delivered the Andrew Lang Memorial Lecture, and the Commemorative Oration at the University of Glasgow's 500th anniversary in 1951.

He was appointed a Privy Counsellor in 1924 and was awarded the GCVO in 1937. He would earn the distinction of LLD from his two alma matres, Edinburgh on 17 July 1924., again in 1931 at the University of London, and again in 1932 at the University of St. Andrews. In North America, he was awarded LLDs from McGill University, Queen's University at Kingston, Dalhousie University and Columbia University, and a DCL from Case Western Reserve University, as well as being inducted into the Order of the Coif.

He was unanimously elected 13 May 1924 the first Honorary Bencher of Inner Temple. He was elected honorary member of the Institution of Civil Engineers, of the Smeatonian Society of Civil Engineers, and of the Institution of Municipal and County Engineers.

== Family ==
He married his childhood sweetheart, Elizabeth Katherine Grace Marshall, on 27 July 1901.

== Publications ==
His autobiography, A Man of Law's Tale, was published in 1952.

== Cases and Bills noted ==
=== A Man of Law's Tale ===
- Corporation of the City of Glasgow v Stirling County Council et al. (1914): G desired to impound river waters in Loch Voil
- Williamson(?) et al. v Corporation of Aberdeen (1910): A desired to divert the River Avon for public use
- City of Glasgow v County Council of Lanark et al. (May–July 1912): G desired to extinguish L
- Falkirk v County Council of Stirling (1911): F desired to encroach on S
- Falkirk v County Council of Stirling (1912): F desired to encroach on S
- Corporation of Dundee v Burgh of Broughty Ferry (1913): D desired to encroach on B
- Corporation of Edinburgh v burgh of Leith (1920): E desired to encroach on L
- Corporation of Greenock v Ports of Glasgow and Gourock (1927): G desired to incorporate GG
- Sandwich Port and Haven Bill (1925)
- River Ouse Drainage Bill (1927)
- Bill for the reconstitution of Albert Hall
- Lochaber Water Power Bill (1921)
- Road Transport Act 1928
- Mortensen v Peters, 1906, 8F(JC)93; 5Adam121: international and territorial waters
- R v Brown, 1907SC(J)67, 5Adam312: B contested lunacy
- Coats v Brown, 1909 SC(J)29, 6Adam19
- Parker v Lord Advocate [1904] AC364, 6F(HL)37
- Colquhoun v FPW 1908 SC(HL)10
- Boyd&Forrest v GSWRC 1912 SC(HL)93, 1915 SC(H)20, 1918 SC(HL)14
- Lord Advocate v Zetland 1920 SC(HL)1
- Young v Kinloch 1911 SC(HL)1
- Wishart v Gibson 1914 SC(HL)53
- Canada v Newfoundland 1927
- 1930 AC 537
- Donoghue v Stevenson 1932 AC 562
- Fibrosa Spolka Akcyjna v Fairbairn Lawson Combe Barbour Ltd 1942 AC 32
- Bank of Portugal v Waterlow & Sons 1932 AC452
- Joyce v DPP 1946 AC347

== Legacy ==
The Lord Macmillan Papers are housed at the British Library. The papers can be accessed through the British Library catalogue.

== References and Bibliography ==
- A.H.B. Constable and H.P. Macmillan, A Treatise on Provisional Orders applicable to Scotland, Edinburgh, 1900
- H.P. Macmillan, A Man of Law's Tale, London: MacMillan and Co., 1952
- H.P. Macmillan, Law and other things
- L. G. Pine, The New Extinct Peerage 1884-1971: Containing Extinct, Abeyant, Dormant and Suspended Peerages With Genealogies and Arms (London, U.K.: Heraldry Today, 1972).

Legal offices
Preceded by William Watson	Lord Advocate; 1924	Succeeded by William Watson
Political offices
New office	Minister of Information; 1939–1940	Succeeded by Sir John Reith
