= Edward Goff Penny (MP) =

Canadian politician

Member of the Canadian Parliament for St. Lawrence
- In office 1896–1900
- Preceded by: new district
- Succeeded by: Robert Bickerdike

Personal details
- Born: 4 September 1858 Montreal, Canada East
- Died: 1 October 1935 (aged 77)
- Party: Liberal
- Occupation: Lawyer

Edward Goff Penny (4 September 1858 – 1 October 1935) was a Canadian politician. He was elected as a Member of Parliament in 1896 for the riding of St. Lawrence. He served until 1900 and did not run for re-election.

1896 Canadian federal election: St. Lawrence
Party	Candidate	Votes
Liberal	Edward Goff Penny	3,632
Conservative	R. W. Smith	2,915
