= Charles Ernest Gault =

Canadian politician

Member of the Legislative Assembly of Quebec for Montréal division no. 5
- In office 1907–1912
- Preceded by: Christopher Benfield Carter
- Succeeded by: None, district abolished

Member of the Legislative Assembly of Quebec for Montréal–Saint-Georges
- In office 1912–1936
- Preceded by: None, district created
- Succeeded by: Gilbert Layton

Personal details
- Born: September 19, 1861 Montreal, Quebec
- Died: December 25, 1946 (aged 85) Montreal, Quebec
- Party: Conservative

Charles Ernest Gault (September 19, 1861 – December 25, 1946) was a politician in Quebec, Canada.

He was born in Montreal, Canada East, and educated at the High School of Montreal.

He was first elected to the Legislative Assembly of Quebec in a 1907 by-election in Montréal division no. 5, and was re-elected in 1908. He was elected in Montréal–Saint-Georges in 1912, 1916, 1919, 1923, 1927, 1931, and 1935. He lost in 1936 and retired from politics.

He served as Conservative leader of the Opposition in the Legislative Assembly of Quebec from 1931 to 1932, after Conservative leader Camillien Houde lost the 1931 Quebec election and also failed to win a seat.

On November 7, 1932, the Conservative caucus chose Maurice Duplessis to be leader of the Opposition, replacing Gault. Duplessis was formally elected Conservative Party leader on October 4, 1933. On December 12, 1933, Gault was expelled from the Conservative caucus and sat as an independent. He was re-elected in the 1935 election as a Conservative, but in his unsuccessful election bid in 1936 he ran as an independent Conservative candidate and lost to Gilbert Layton of the Union Nationale, which had been formed from the merger of the now-defunct Conservative Party of Quebec and the short-lived Action libérale nationale.

== See also ==
- Politics of Quebec
- Quebec general elections
- List of Quebec leaders of the Opposition
- Timeline of Quebec history

Political offices
Preceded by Camillien Houde (Conservative)	Leader of the Opposition in Quebec; 1931–1932	Succeeded by Maurice Duplessis (Conservative)
