= Matthew Hutchinson =

Canadian politician

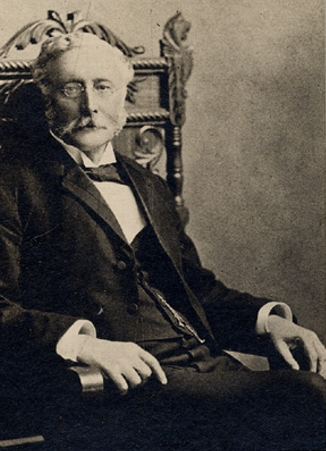

Member of the Legislative Assembly of Quebec for Montréal division no. 5
- In office 1900–1904
- Preceded by: Robert Bickerdike
- Succeeded by: Christopher Benfield Carter

Personal details
- Born: October 20, 1843 Musquodoboit, Nova Scotia
- Died: January 22, 1926 (aged 82) Westmount, Quebec
- Party: Quebec Liberal Party

Matthew Hutchinson (October 20, 1843 – January 22, 1926) was a Canadian lawyer, politician, and judge.

Born in Musquodoboit, Nova Scotia the son of William Scott Hutchinson and Sarah Marthe Archibald, Hutchinson studied at the London Grammar School in London, Ontario before attending McGill University. He was called to the Quebec Bar in 1874 and was created a Queen's Counsel in 1899.

A practicing lawyer he joined the faculty of McGill University in 1877 where he was a professor. From 1891 to 1893, he was Mayor of Westmount, Quebec. He was acclaimed to the Legislative Assembly of Quebec in 1900 for the riding of Montréal division no. 5. A Liberal, he did not run in 1904. He was appointed to the Quebec Superior Court in 1904.

He died in Westmount in 1926 and was buried in the Mount Royal Cemetery.
