= Maurice Duplessis =

Premier of Quebec from 1936 to 1939 and 1944 to 1959

The Honourable Maurice Duplessis QC
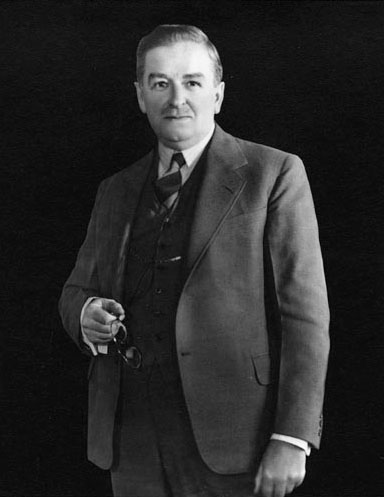
- Duplessis in 1947

16th Premier of Quebec
- In office August 30, 1944 – September 7, 1959
- Monarchs: George VI; Elizabeth II
- Lieutenant Governor: Eugène Fiset; Gaspard Fauteux; Onésime Gagnon
- Preceded by: Adélard Godbout
- Succeeded by: Paul Sauvé
- In office August 26, 1936 – November 8, 1939
- Monarchs: Edward VIII; George VI
- Lieutenant Governor: Ésioff-Léon Patenaude
- Preceded by: Adélard Godbout
- Succeeded by: Adélard Godbout
Cabinet portfolios
Attorney General of Quebec
In office August 30, 1944 – September 7, 1959
Premier	Himself
Preceded by	Léon Casgrain
Succeeded by	Antoine Rivard
In office August 26, 1936 – November 8, 1939
Premier	Himself
Preceded by	Charles-Auguste Bertrand
Succeeded by	Wilfrid Girouard
Minister of Roads of Quebec
In office July 7, 1938 – November 30, 1938
Premier	Himself
Preceded by	François Leduc
Succeeded by	Anatole Carignan
Minister of Lands and Forests of Quebec
In office February 23, 1937 – July 27, 1938
Premier	Himself
Preceded by	Oscar Drouin
Succeeded by	John Samuel Bourque
Legislative and party leadership positions
Leader of the Opposition of Quebec
In office November 8, 1939 – August 30, 1944
Preceded by	Télesphore-Damien Bouchard
Succeeded by	Adélard Godbout
In office November 7, 1932 – August 26, 1936
Preceded by	Charles Ernest Gault
Succeeded by	Télesphore-Damien Bouchard
Leader of Union Nationale
In office June 20, 1936 – September 7, 1959
Preceded by	First leader
Succeeded by	Paul Sauvé
Leader of the Conservative Party of Quebec
In office October 4, 1933 – June 20, 1936
Preceded by	Charles Ernest Gault (acting)
Succeeded by	Position abolished

Member of the Legislative Assembly for Trois-Rivières
- In office May 16, 1927 – September 7, 1959
- Preceded by: Louis-Philippe Mercier
- Succeeded by: Yves Gabias

70th President of the Bar of Quebec, Bar of Trois-Rivières
- In office 1937–1938
- Preceded by: Lucien Moraud
- Succeeded by: Paul Lacoste

Personal details
- Born: Maurice Le Noblet Duplessis (Note: Baptized Joseph Maurice Stanislas Le Noblet Duplessis); April 20, 1890 Trois-Rivières, Quebec, Canada
- Died: September 7, 1959 (aged 69) Schefferville, Quebec, Canada
- Resting place: Saint-Louis Cemetery, Trois-Rivières
- Party: Union Nationale
- Other political affiliations: Conservative Party of Quebec (pre-1936)
- Parent: Nérée Duplessis (father)
- Education: Université Laval de Montréal
- Profession: Lawyer
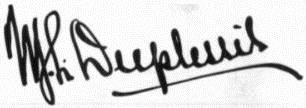
- Signature

Maurice Le Noblet Duplessis (French pronunciation: [mɔʁis lə nɔblɛ dyplɛsi]; April 20, 1890 – September 7, 1959), popularly known as "Le Chef" ([lə ʃɛf], "The Boss"), (Note: Sometimes rendered in French as "Cheuf" to reflect the particularities of pronunciation of Quebec French; see also cheuf on French Wiktionary) was a Canadian lawyer and politician who served as the 16th premier of Quebec. A conservative, nationalist, populist, anti-communist, anti-unionist, and fervent Catholic, Duplessis and his party, the Union Nationale, dominated provincial politics from the 1920s to the 1950s. With a total of 18 years and 82 days in office, he remains the longest-serving premier in Quebec history.

Son of Nérée Duplessis, a lawyer who served as a Conservative member of the Legislative Assembly (MLA), Maurice studied law in Montreal and became a member of the Bar of Quebec in 1913. He then returned to his home town of Trois-Rivières, where he founded a successful legal consultancy. Duplessis narrowly lost his first campaign for the Trois-Rivières seat in the 1923 election, but managed to get elected in 1927 as a Conservative MLA. His rhetorical skills helped him become the leader of the Official Opposition in the Legislative Assembly in 1933 in the place of Camillien Houde. As opposition leader, he agreed to a coalition with Paul Gouin's Action libérale nationale (ALN), which they called the Union Nationale. It lost in 1935 but gained a majority the following year as Gouin retired from politics and Duplessis took over the leadership, thus breaking almost 40 years of uninterrupted rule by the Quebec Liberal Party. In addition to his premiership duties, Duplessis served as attorney general and briefly held other ministerial posts as well.

The first three years in government were difficult for Duplessis as the government struggled to respond to the ongoing hardships of the Great Depression. That term saw the introduction of several key welfare policies (such as the universal minimum wage and old-age pensions), but the effort to strengthen his rule by calling a snap election in 1939 failed as his campaigning on the issue of World War II backfired and his government left the economy in a poor state. However, the Conscription Crisis of 1944 propelled him back to power in that year's election. Duplessis then served as premier until his death.

As was the general trend of the time, he presided over a period of robust economic growth due to the rising demand in resources, which the province used to develop Côte-Nord and rural areas. Duplessis was a strong proponent of economic liberalism and implemented pro-business policies by keeping taxes low, refraining from regulation and adopting pro-employer labour policies, in particular by cracking down on trade unions. He usually met the federal government's initiatives with strong resistance due to his convictions on provincial autonomy. In the social domain, Duplessis maintained and protected the traditional role of the Catholic Church in Quebec's society, notably in healthcare and education. He was ruthless to the perceived enemies of the Church or of the Catholic nature of the province, such as Jehovah's Witnesses, whom he harassed using his government's apparatus. Communists were persecuted under the Padlock Law, which Duplessis authored in 1937.

Duplessis's legacy remains controversial more than 60 years after his death. Compared to the Anglophones, the French Canadians remained worse off in the province where they constituted a majority just as his government was courting Anglophone and out-of-province businessmen to invest. This clientelist relationship with the business spheres often morphed into outright corruption. Duplessis's authoritarian inclinations, his all-powerful electoral machine, staunch conservatism and nationalism, a cozy relationship with the Catholic Church, the mistreatment of Duplessis Orphans and the apparent backwardness of his model of development were also subject of criticism. His critics label his tenure as the Grande Noirceur ('Great Darkness'), a term popularized during the Quiet Revolution in the 1960s. Since the 1990s, academics have revisited Duplessism and concluded that the assessment of his rule requires nuance and, in some cases, have advocated outright rejection of the pejorative label.

== Biography ==
=== Early life ===
==== Family ====
Maurice Le Noblet Duplessis was born on April 20, 1890, in Trois-Rivières to a religious family that was quite wealthy. He was the second child and only son of Nérée Le Noblet Duplessis, a Conservative member of the Legislative Assembly of Quebec (MLA) for Saint-Maurice. Maurice's father, who came from a family of peasants residing in nearby Yamachiche, was a kind but busy man and spent little time with the family, which was typical at the time. Two of Nérée's sisters married politicians who would also sit in the Legislative Assembly. Maurice's mother was Berthe Genest, who had Scottish and Irish origins on her maternal side. The family of the future premier was well-disposed to Anglophones; Duplessis would even joke that he was "one of them".

At the end of the 19th century, the Duplessis family of Trois-Rivières was active in the political and religious life of the region, and the members of the family could often be found among conservative and ultramontanist sympathizers, with whom they would often debate current political events. Some of the influential figures of the time, including Louis-Olivier Taillon, Edmund James Flynn, Joseph-Mathias Tellier, Louis-Philippe Pelletier and Thomas Chapais, could be found there. Moreover, Maurice's father, a deeply pious person, maintained close relations with Louis-François Richer Laflèche, the bishop of the Diocese of Trois-Rivières, where he worked as legal counsel. The bishop supported his electoral bid for the Saint-Maurice seat in 1886, which Nérée won. Maurice was born during his father's reelection campaign, who chose to name his son for the electoral district he was the MLA for. The newborn boy was then baptized by Laflèche himself.

Close relatives of Maurice Duplessis

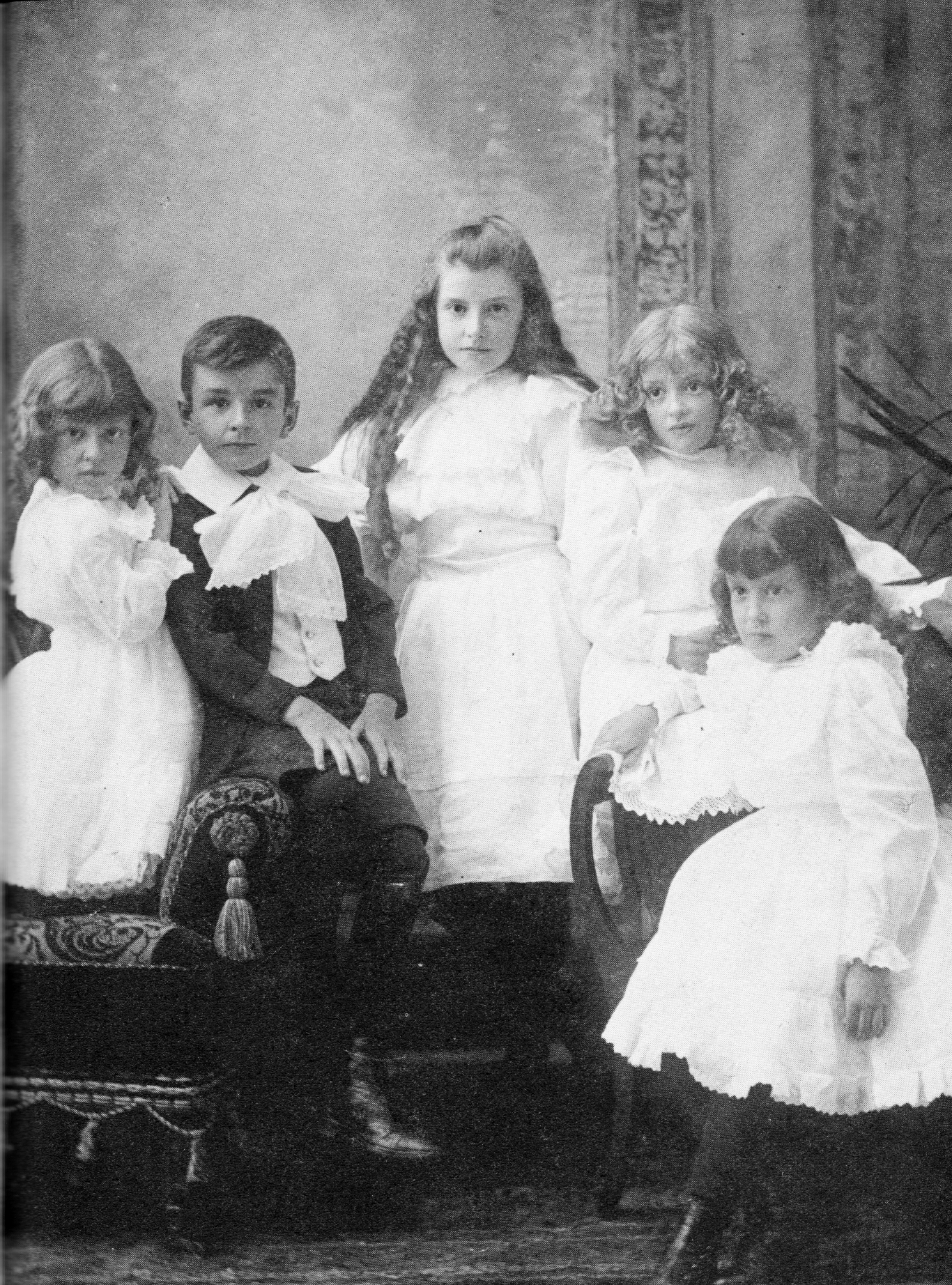
Maurice Duplessis with his sisters, Marguerite, Jeanne, Étiennette and Joséphine-Gabrielle, 1897

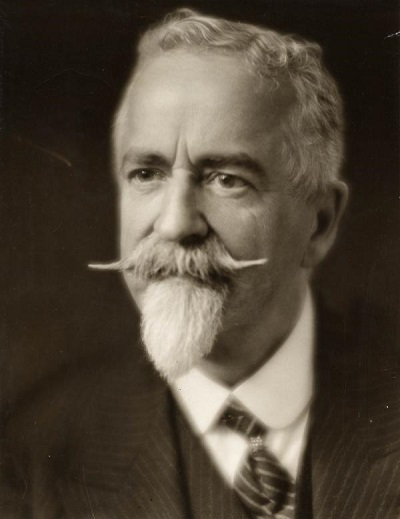
Samuel Genest, president of the Association canadienne-française d'éducation de l'Ontario (1932–33), a Franco-Ontarian advocacy organization, uncle of Maurice Duplessis

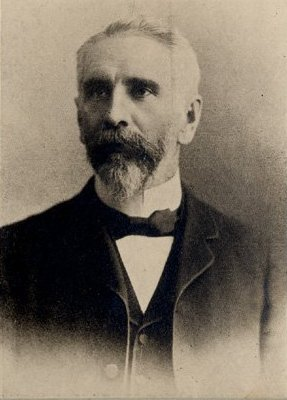
Richard-Stanislas Cooke, mayor of Trois-Rivières (1896–98), Liberal MLA for Trois-Rivières, uncle of Maurice Duplessis

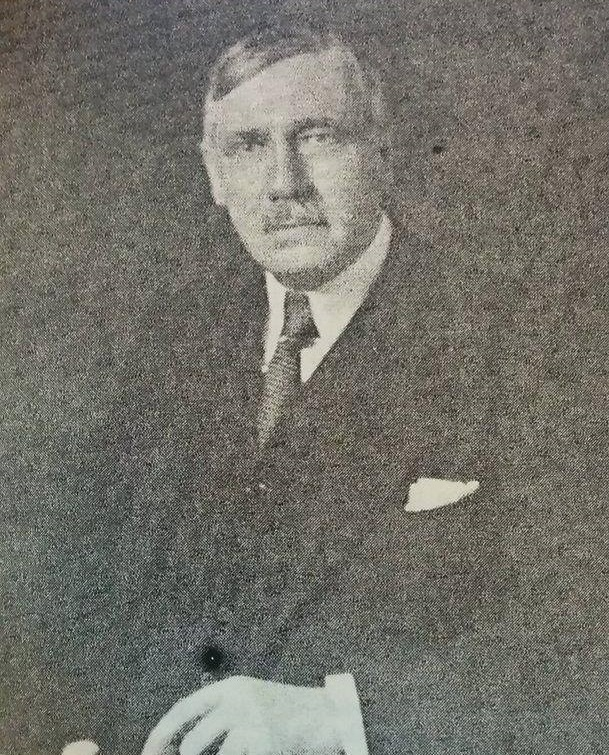
William-Pierre Grant, Liberal MLA for Champlain, uncle of Maurice Duplessis

Ancestry of Maurice Duplessis

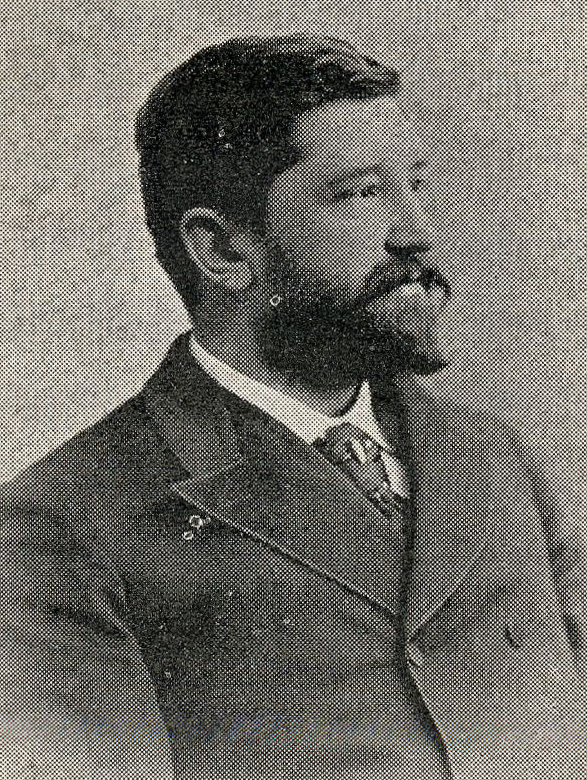
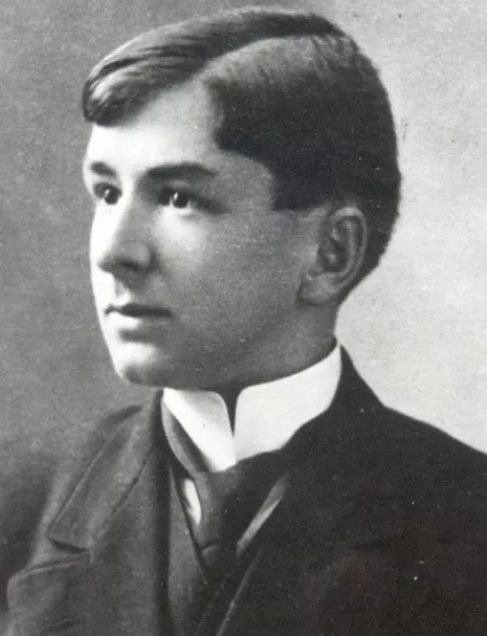
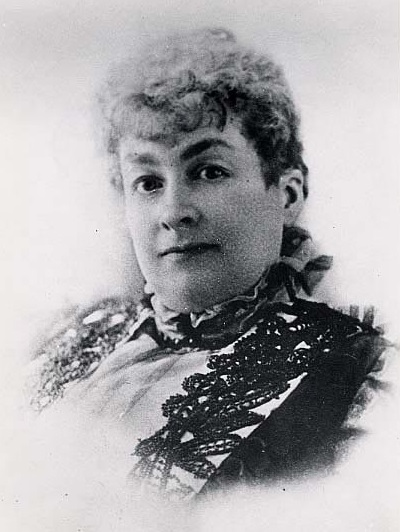
Joseph Le Noblet Duplessis Sr. (1795–1865), oldest of 6 children of Isidore Le Noblet Duplessis
Joseph Le Noblet Duplessis Jr. (1820–1896), second oldest of 7 children of Joseph Duplessis Sr.
Marie-Rose Caron (1797–1866)
Nérée Le Noblet Duplessis (1855–1926), second oldest of 4 children of Joseph Duplessis Jr.; lawyer for the Diocese of Trois-Rivières, Conservative MLA for Saint-Maurice (1886–1900), later mayor of Trois-Rivières (1904–05) and judge of the Superior Court of Quebec
Marie-Louise Descoteaux-Lefebvre (1826–c. 1900)
Maurice Le Noblet Duplessis (1890–1959), photographed 1907
Laurent-Ubald Genest, greffier (clerk) of Trois-Rivières
Berthe Genest (1861–1921) (Note: Her full name was Marie Catherine Camille Berthe Genest.)
John MacCallum (1795–1864), police mayor
Emma MacCallum (Note: Her full name was Marie Esther Charlotte Emma MacCallum) of Montreal
Flavie Raymond (1804–1877)

==== Studies ====
In 1898, Duplessis left his home city to study at the Collège Notre-Dame in Montreal, which was run by the Congregation of Holy Cross. There he met André Bessette (better known as Brother André), then porter of the college. He came to like young Duplessis and handed him over the task of finding students whom the rector wished to see. (Note: In the 1950s, when Duplessis was premier of Quebec, he was among the foremost people lobbying for the canonization of Brother André) The relationship was so close that it was then that Duplessis developed the cult of Saint Joseph, which he carried for the rest of his life and which sometimes would influence his political choices. (Note: For instance, Duplessis would always schedule his most important political events on Wednesdays due to the fact that in French Canada, Saint Joseph's day was observed every week on that day. Duplessis would also go to the Cathedral-Basilica of Notre-Dame de Québec on Wednesdays to pray to Saint Joseph.) The future premier was a bright student, excelling in French, history, Latin and philosophy; at the same time, he was known to be playful and sometimes mischievous (a "scamp", as Conrad Black suggests), which would often lead Duplessis into trouble.

In 1902, Duplessis moved to the Séminaire de Trois-Rivières in order to pursue his study in a classical college. Maurice continued to excel in other subjects, including history, theology, Latin and Greek, which helped him become the best student in his year. In particular, he sharpened his rhetorical skills while attending the debate club at the college's Saint Thomas Aquinas Society. Maurice would, as Conrad Black wrote, "enjoy, almost wallow in, extravagant but thin treatises on the founders of French Canada", where he would show his attachment to and admiration of his roots, the rural lifestyle and the Catholic faith. He was especially fond of Louis Hébert, one of the first colonizers of the New France and a pioneer of farming in the area. (Note: Here is an example of Duplessis's speech praising the Catholic heritage of French Canada: "How beautiful and meritorious was the act that had as its objective the establishment of Catholicism on unexplored shores in the bosom of barbarous nations plunged in the tenebrous thickets of idolatry! Ah! The sea! Ladies and gentlemen, it was not always a gentle expanse of limpid water in which the luminous rays of a resplendent sun were brightly reflected; these were not always undulating waves of symmetrical aspect on which a fragile and primitive vessel was maintained in buoyant tranquility. One required audacity to launch himself in a light caravelle on this pelagic immensity. [...] In light of all his glorious acts, tell me that Louis Hebert wasn't a great Christian, tell me that he wasn't a devoted and impassioned lover of the fleur-de-lys flag." Duplessis further praised Hébert and his advocacy of the rural way of life: "Louis Hébert understood that with the honest and good fortune of health of soul and of body, life in the fields brings real happiness. This intelligent man had understood that agriculture is the most solid foundation of a nascent colony. In our days, unhappily, the imitators of Louis Hébert, the lawyers, notaries, apothecaries, who transform themselves into cultivators, have become very rare, and the countryside witnesses the departure from their homesteads of legions of young men strong and vigorous, who leave to encumber the offices of great cities.")

Duplessis's interest for politics appeared at a very young age. As early as at the age of ten, Maurice expressed strong interest in the electoral statistics of Quebec, and later in his adolescence, he was already engaging in political meetings and was speaking with the voters. The future premier was preparing for public life by working for a political organization of Joseph-Arthur Barrette, a Conservative serving as member of Parliament for Berthier. Duplessis understood from that experience that he preferred the practical aspects of politics rather than the theory.

When finishing school, Maurice Duplessis was thinking of either further engaging in public life or becoming a priest in the Catholic Church. Even though the clerical career was typical of the young people like Duplessis and it would give him influence, Maurice ultimately rejected the priesthood as he thought that this job bore too many constraints. He would later confide to his secretary that "sacerdocy [was] too much for me." He was not interested in becoming a businessman, either, because at that time English Canadians had much better conditions for pursuing that path. Thus, in autumn of 1910, he enrolled in the faculty of law at the Université Laval in Montreal, which is now a separate university called Université de Montréal. Finishing law school was then a standard way to get into politics. In parallel to his studies, he trained in the offices of Rodolphe Monty et Alfred Duranleau, two nationalist conservatives and friends of Duplessis's family, where Maurice was referred to by his father.

While studying, he was noted for his liveliness, sharp responses and socializing. Duplessis, sitting in the opposition, was a local star within the model parliament organized by the university. Outside his field of studies and political engagement, he followed professional baseball standings and occasionally went to opera, but that was where his hobbies ended.

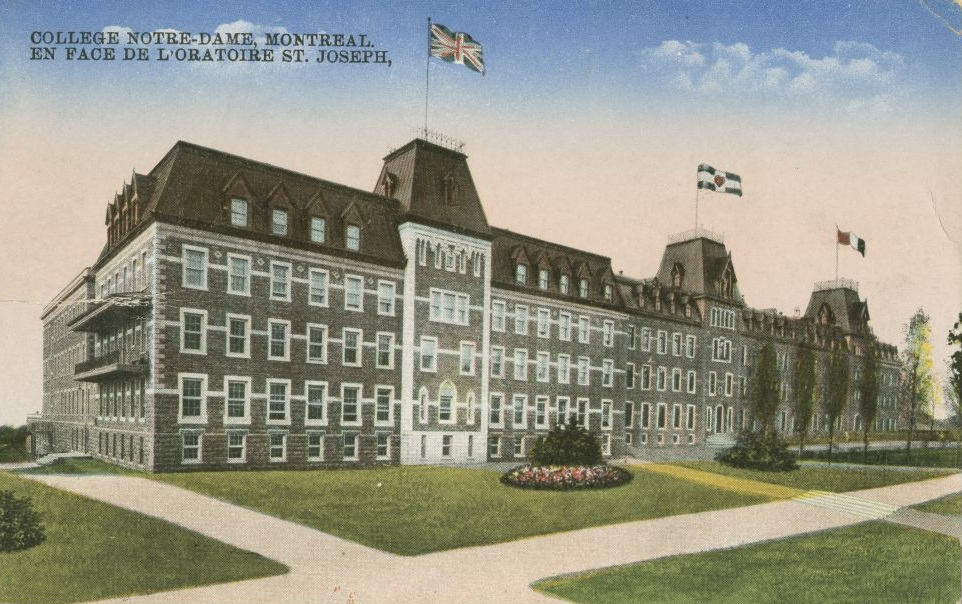
A postcard showing the Collège Notre-Dame in Montreal, c. 1910

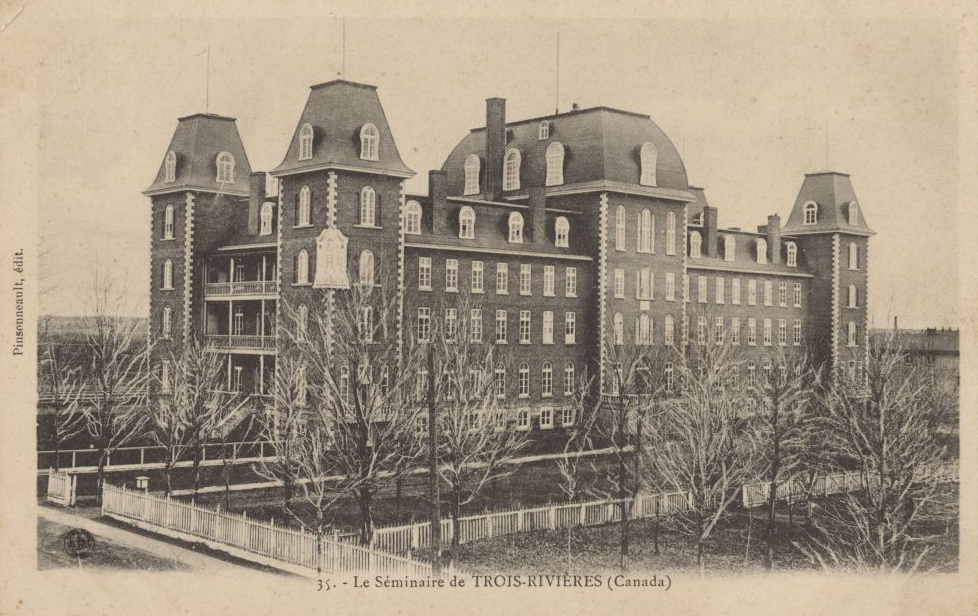
The Séminaire de Trois-Rivières, photographed sometime between 1903 and 1914

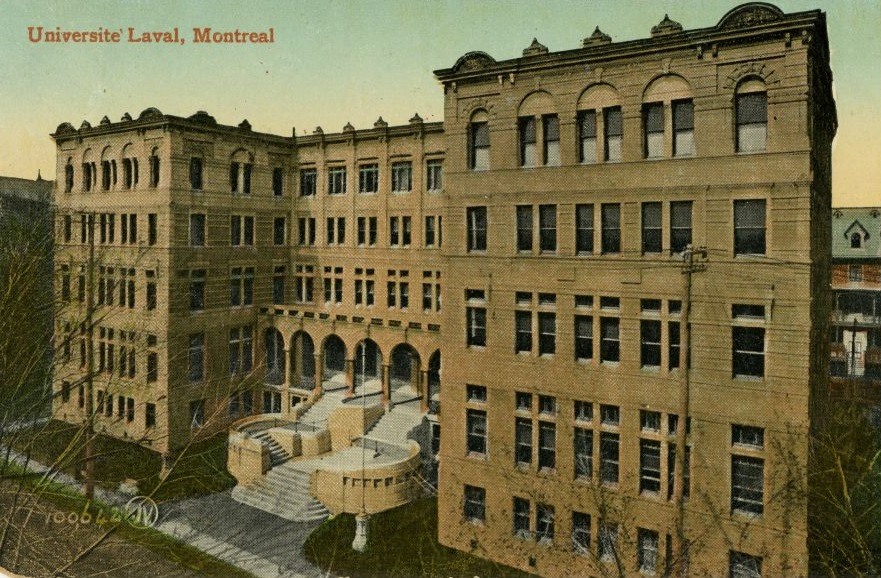
A postcard showing the Université Laval Montreal branch, now known as the Université de Montréal, 1911

=== Entry into politics ===
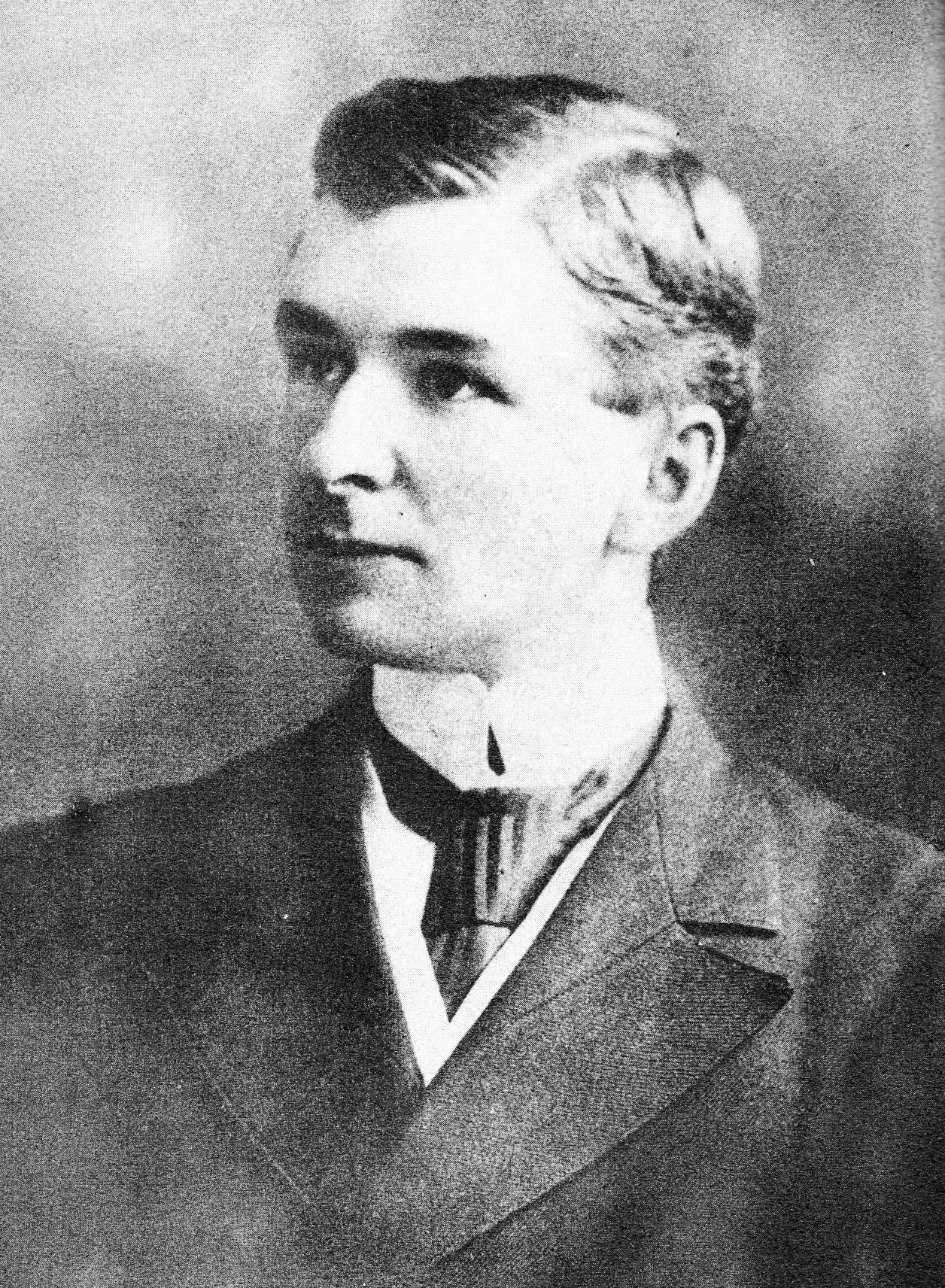
Maurice Duplessis in 1911, as a law student

==== Law practice ====
After three years of studies, Duplessis was admitted to the Bar of Quebec in September 1913. (Note: The biographical notice of Maurice Duplessis on the webpage of the National Assembly of Quebec gives the date of September 4. Conrad Black suggests it happened on September 14.) Maurice returned to his home town to practice law at the Bar of Trois-Rivières, whose member he would stay until his death. He first worked together with his father, but this was cut short as on June 15, 1914, Nérée was nominated as judge of the Superior Court of Quebec. The future Premier then opened his own consultancy, Duplessis, Langlois & Lamothe, Avocats et Procureurs, on Hart Street, behind his parents' house. Langlois was an old friend of his from the Séminaire who became husband of Duplessis's sister, Gabrielle. Together with another lawyer from Trois-Rivières, Léon Lamothe, they formed a partnership which lasted well into the 1930s. Duplessis did not serve in the Canadian Armed Forces during World War I as he was exempt from conscription.

Practicing civil law more than criminal law, Duplessis developed a large client base among the ordinary people, who were attracted due to his arguments in court that often proved persuasive. He was quickly recognized as a sociable and competent lawyer who approached his cases carefully, and thus became a popular figure in the town. The young lawyer engaged in various activities of his area, notably directing of a local baseball team, and became a fixture in high-end taverns of his town. His professional success, briefly interrupted by the death of his mother in 1921, let him buy a personal Winton on a loan (to great dismay of his father). Duplessis suspended his law career in early 1934 amid mounting duties in the Legislative Assembly, though he would still be mentioned as a member of the bar.

==== First electoral successes ====
Despite a promising start to his legal career, Duplessis did not lose sight from his political ambitions. He made his first attempt to get to the Legislative Assembly of Quebec in 1923 as a Conservative, seeking to oust the incumbent Liberal MLA, Louis-Philippe Mercier, from his Trois-Rivières seat. The campaign was a heated one. Mercier benefited from a well-organized political structure in the area directed by his mentor, Jacques Bureau, who at the time served as a member of Parliament for Three Rivers and St. Maurice and the federal minister of customs and excise. (Note: Étiennette Duplessis, sister of Maurice, would marry Édouard Bureau, Jacques's son, in the April following the election) Maurice counted on the solidarity of his fellow lawyers, the good reputation among his clients as well as his father's acquaintances' support (notably Louis-Olivier Taillon). Some of them made speeches in Duplessis's favour. His campaign focused on the criticism of what Duplessis alleged was Premier Louis-Alexandre Taschereau's contempt towards provincial autonomy and municipal rights as well as of the mismanagement of the judiciary. Despite a rather close race, Maurice lost to the incumbent, 1,328 to 1,612 votes. Duplessis at the time did not expect to win the riding anyway, but hoped that his good initial showing would make him a viable candidate as the opposition leader in the region.

Four years later, Duplessis attempted a second run to the Legislative Assembly, campaigning among working- and middle-class families by paying personal visits to them. His resolve to get to the provincial parliament increased even further after his father died in 1926. At election time, Duplessis flipped the seat for the first time in 27 years, winning 2,622 to Mercier's 2,496 votes. This happened even as the Conservatives only captured 9 out of 85 seats. In his victory speech, Duplessis reportedly declared that "[here] stands before you a future Premier of Quebec".

At the time when Duplessis was elected, the Legislative Assembly was only in session for two months in a year, which allowed Duplessis to spend more time in his electoral district. Duplessis became immediately active on the parliament floor once the parliament convened on January 10, 1928. In his maiden speech on January 19, the Legislative Assembly freshman decried the overemphasis on industrial development, as opposed to rural and small-business interests and called to stop increasing taxes and to respect the religious nature of Sundays. He also proposed to make an inventory of the forest industry (it was suspected at the time that the resources were being overexploited) and to reorganize the provincial police. The first speech left Premier Taschereau impressed, who allegedly remarked that "this young man [...] [would] go far". Duplessis's rhetorical skills and the knowledge of the law on the books made him a rising star in the opposition. When Arthur Sauvé left the leadership of the Conservatives, it was suggested that Duplessis could take the steers of the battered party, but Duplessis refused as he was not ready yet. Camillien Houde, Mayor of Montreal, was nominated instead, but he often had to leave the parliament sessions because of his other demanding job. Therefore, Duplessis, whom the Conservative caucus already saw as a safe alternative to Houde should the leader's policies fail, was able to informally lead the caucus in Houde's absence.

Arthur Sauvé, in his resignation speech, asked his successor "to reestablish order in our ravaged ranks". Even though the new leader liked Duplessis, the future premier did not trust Houde's organizational capabilities, finding him "a verbose, blustering [and] impetuous man". He also said to his party colleague, Antonio Barrette, who would briefly serve as Premier in 1960: "You're going to see Houde get to the top of the mountain and then be over the hill". Conrad Black characterized his relationship with Houde, together with his political views, in the following way:

Maurice Duplessis was in many ways fundamentally conservative; he mistrusted the flamboyant and doubted the improbable. Family counted with him. So did a man's sense of process. Camillien Houde he considered an unmethodical multiple-bankrupt without background of family or profession, untried at everything except tubthumping; an extraordinary personality and an original character, but impulsive, self-indulgent, and superficial. He did not think that this endomorphic gadfly would prove a match for the crafty, magisterial, and thorough M. Taschereau.

Later events seemed to confirm Duplessis's intuition. In the 1931 election, the Conservatives were again resoundingly defeated, winning only 11 seats out of 90 despite the fact that the Conservatives got a markedly larger share of votes provincially. Houde lost his own riding; Duplessis got reelected with a razor-thin margin of 41 votes (3,812 votes versus 3,771 for Liberal Louis-Philippe Bigué). Upon learning the results, Taschereau declared that "this outcome [meant] the end of Houdism".

Quebec politics of 1920s and 1930s

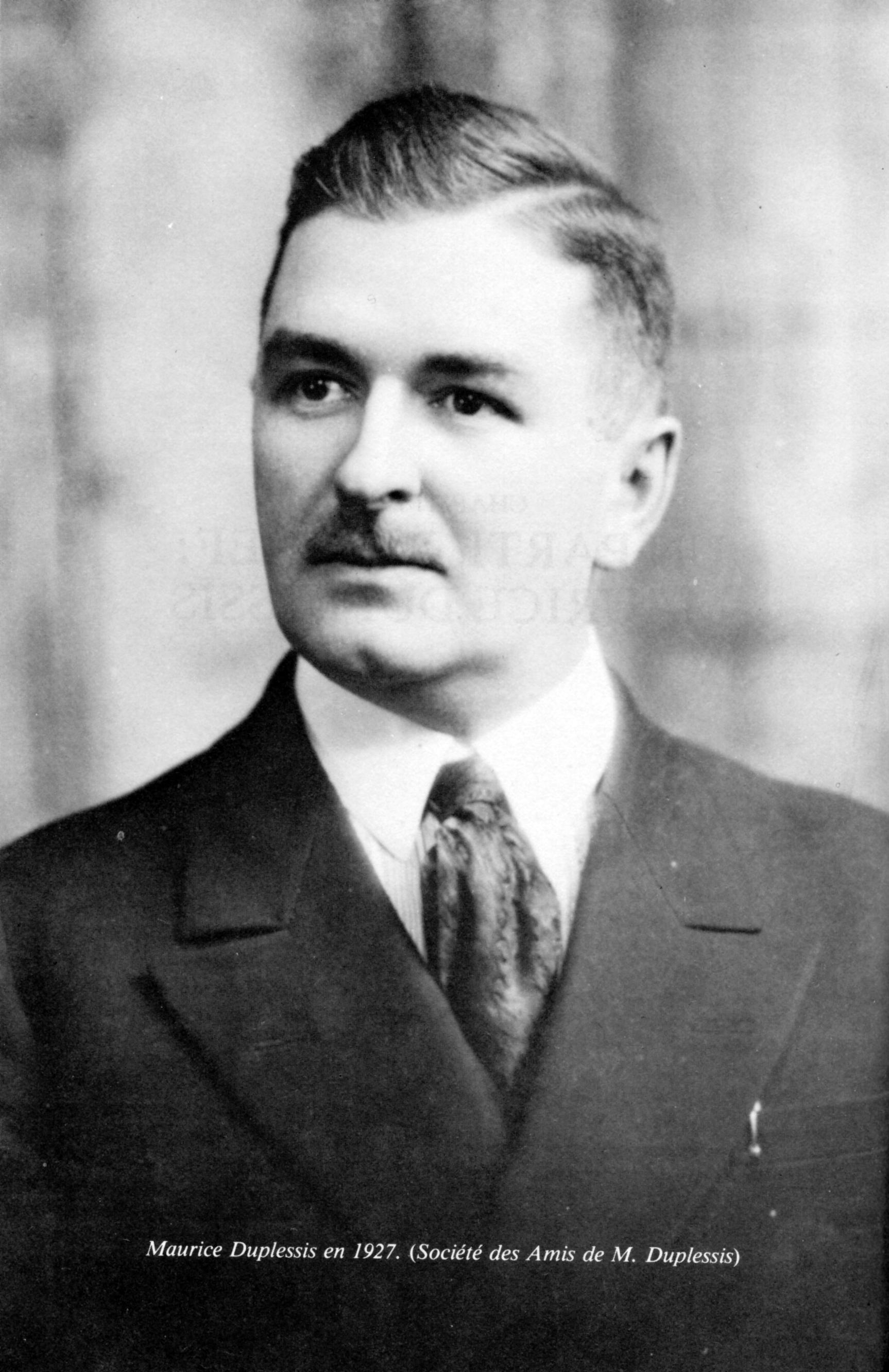
Maurice Duplessis in 1927, the year of his first successful election

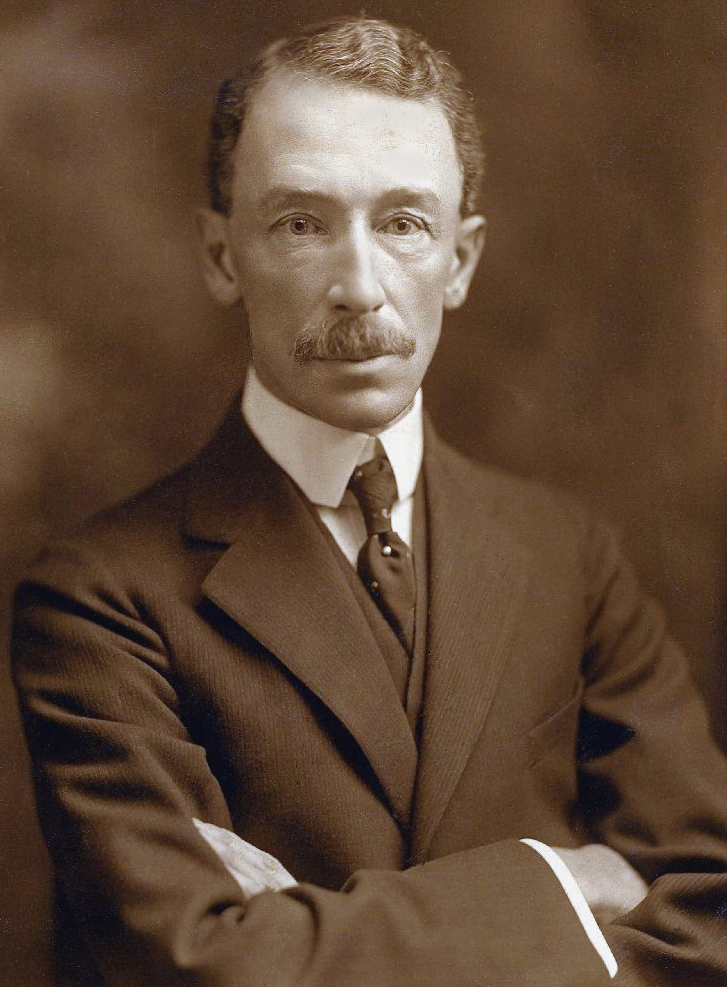
Louis-Alexandre Taschereau, MLA for Montmorency, leader of the Quebec Liberal Party and premier of Quebec in 1920–1936

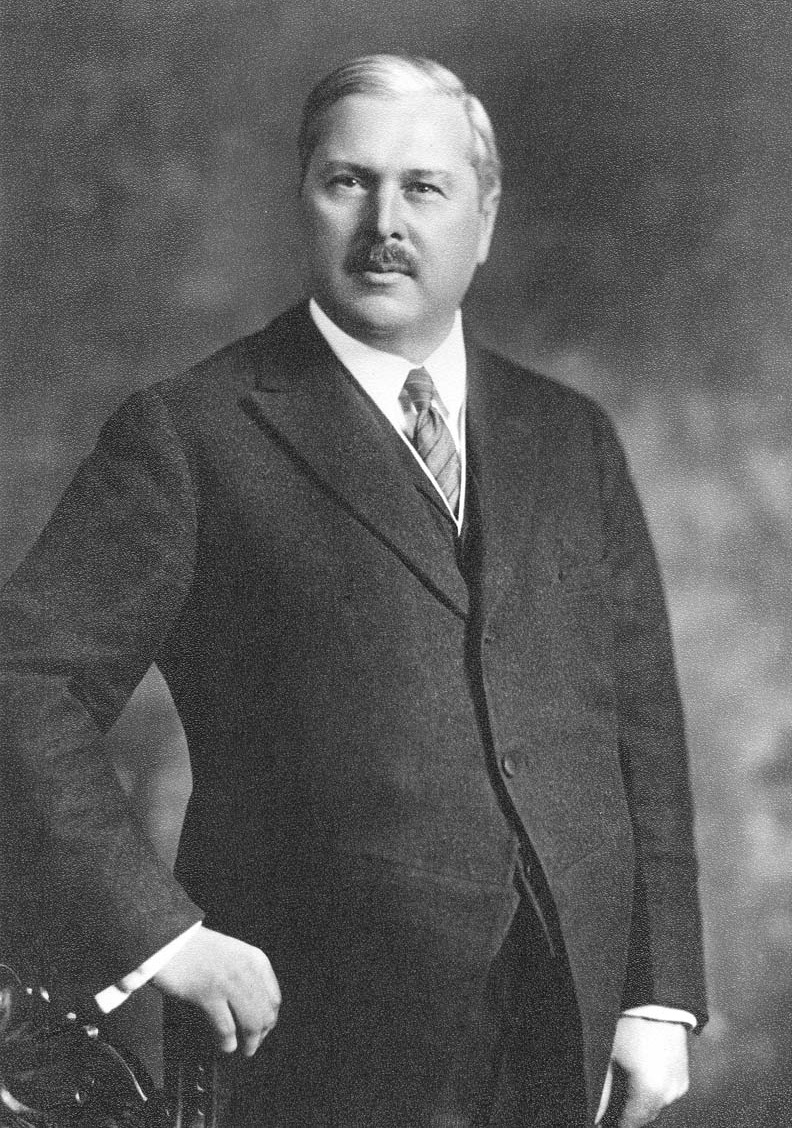
Arthur Sauvé, MLA for Deux-Montagnes, leader of the Conservative Party of Quebec in 1916–1929 and father of Paul Sauvé, who would replace Duplessis as premier of Quebec after his death in 1959

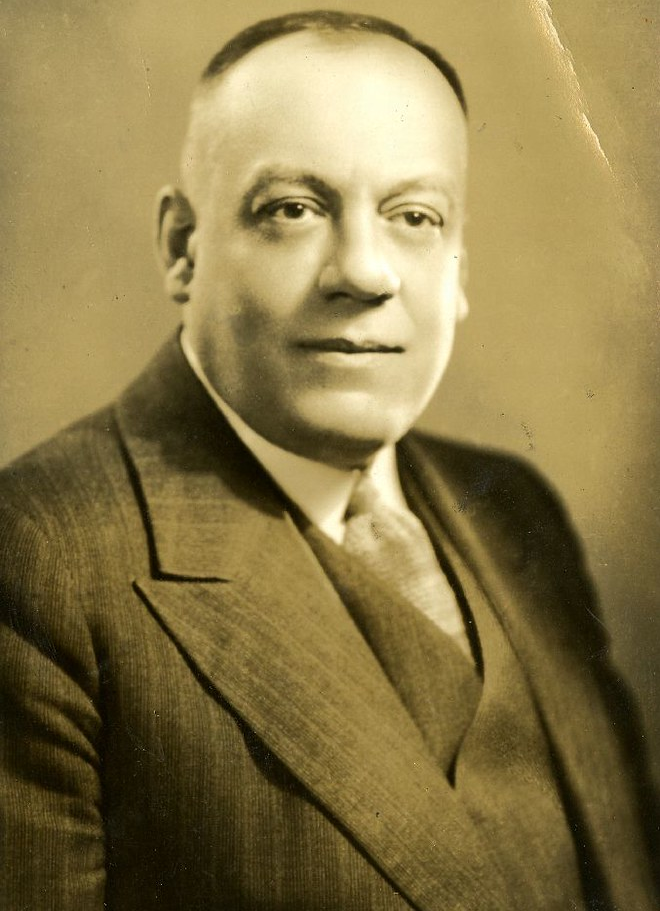
Camillien Houde, the penultimate leader of the Conservative Party of Quebec in 1929–1931, MLA for Montréal–Sainte-Marie and mayor of Montreal

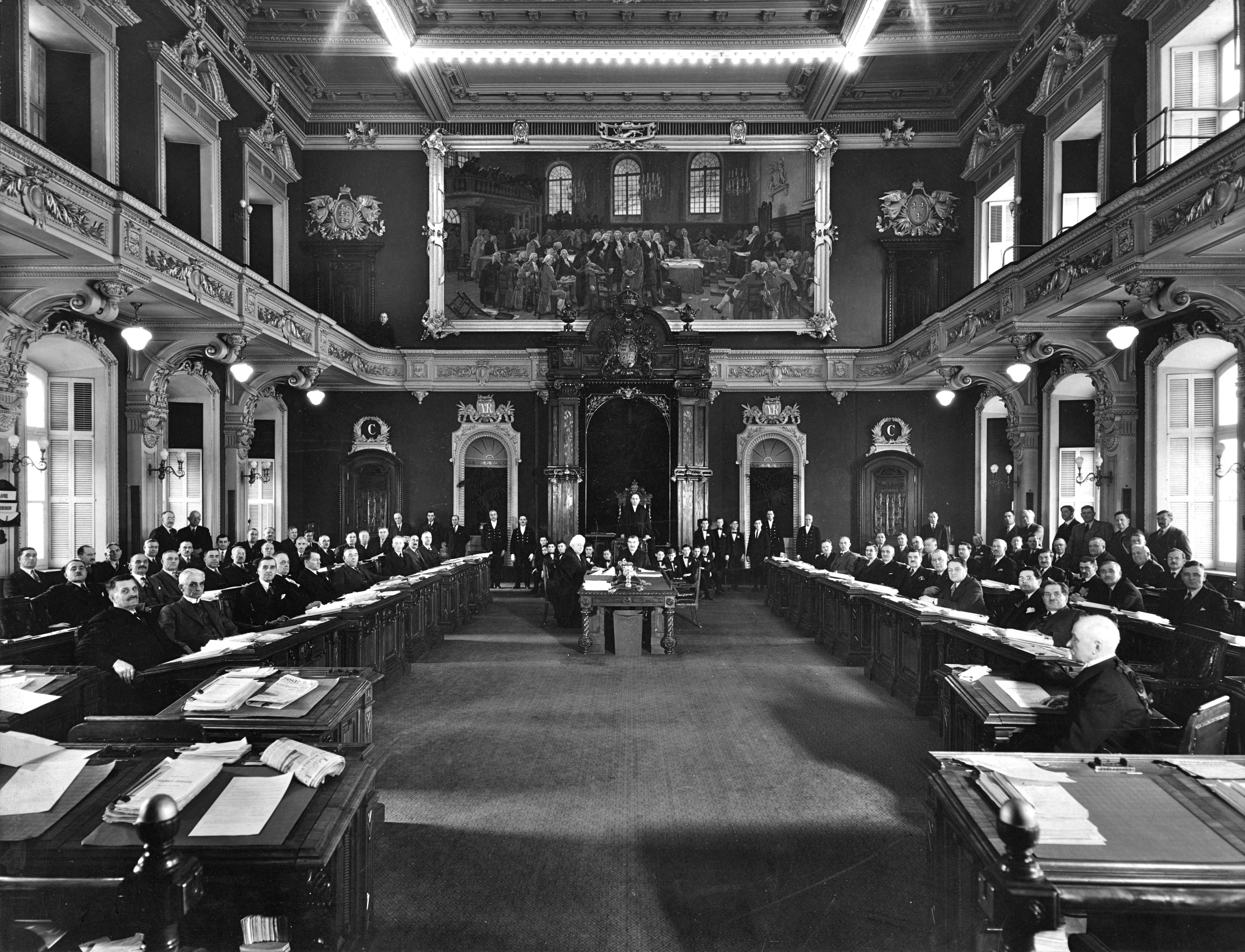
A Legislative Assembly session in the Blue Room on April 5, 1933. Duplessis, elected from the oldest continuous provincial riding in Quebec, is seated in the third position from the background in the first row, directly opposite Taschereau.

=== Rise to power ===
==== Leader of the Official Opposition ====
The 1931 election saw the Conservatives' internal strife, already present in Sauvé years, intensify. The party members could not even agree to a common strategy of dealing with the results of the election. Houde wanted to challenge 63 electoral results in the province, but Duplessis was against this idea because of his thin margin. The plan was frustrated by the government because a change in electoral law made the recounts too expensive. The Conservatives increasingly grew fed up with Houde's performance, and since he was no longer an MLA, lost his Montreal mayorship election in April 1932 and had trouble maintaining his newspaper, he had little real power in the caucus. Therefore, when in an effort to appease the Anglophone community, Houde unexpectedly designated an ageing Charles Ernest Gault, his ally and long-time MLA from Montréal–Saint-Georges, as the new leader of the parliamentary caucus, the party overrode the decision. Thus, on November 7, Duplessis became leader of the opposition. This choice was formally confirmed during a party congress in Sherbrooke on October 4–5, 1933, when Duplessis got 332 votes of the delegates (including from 7 out of 10 MLAs and all but one federal minister from Quebec) to 214 cast for a more moderate Onésime Gagnon, an MLA from Dorchester. During the convention, Duplessis gained most support from young members advocating for provincial autonomy; federal and Anglophone Conservatives as well as supporters for Houde tended to vote for his opponent. The choice was well received by the high clergy and Henry George Carroll, the Lieutenant Governor of Quebec, but Houde was bitter at his ouster and would only reconcile with him after World War II.

The governing Liberals also had problems of their own. Quebec was in the midst of the Great Depression, which left Canada's economy declining. The Liberal Party, which had been in power for more than 35 years, was suffering from internal tensions, too, but also from the laissez-faire economic policies that proved inadequate for the crisis. Conrad Black additionally attributed the party's woes to its inflexibility and population's weariness of the government that had been in power for too long (by the 1935 election, Taschereau had been ruling the province for 15 years). Duplessis repeatedly questioned the government on its failure to make a turnaround. He pointed to the overcapitalization of companies and to the general chaos in the province's industry and resource exploitation. Duplessis further alleged unjust treatment of municipalities, lack of respect for traditions and unnecessary confrontations with the federal government. The leader of the opposition also decried the government's policy of prioritizing big business interests instead of developing rural areas. Some of the Liberal MLAs eventually became disillusioned with Taschereau and created a new party, the Action libérale nationale (ALN).

==== Coalition with the Action libérale nationale ====
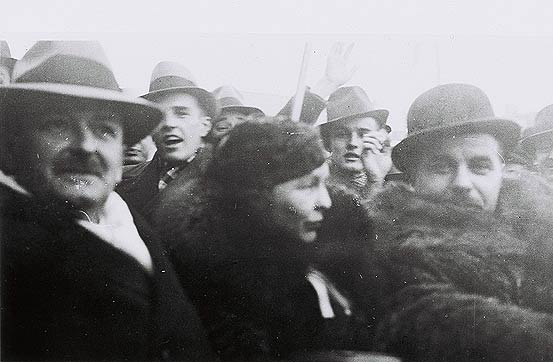
Paul Gouin (right) and Maurice Duplessis (left) on a political rally of the Conservative–ALN coalition, November 1935

The new party, which in particular despised the big business's interests in the province, consisted of nationalist and progressive MLAs led by Paul Gouin and included some other figures, such as Philippe Hamel, Joseph-Ernest Grégoire and Oscar Drouin. The members of the new political force drew heavily from the Programme de restauration sociale, a social policy document drafted by the Catholic clergy in 1933. It advocated corporatism as an alternative for capitalism and communism and sought to improve the position of French Canadians in the province by expanding the social welfare net, breaking (and, if needed, nationalizing) business trusts and revitalizing rural areas. In particular, the party was critical of the energy trusts and advocated for bringing the hydroelectricity companies under state control.

Initially, Maurice Duplessis was skeptical of the third political force, saying that "two [parties] are enough: one good and one bad". He was then preparing for the upcoming 1935 election, starting a tour across the province more than a year before the voters were to go to the ballots. To a large extent, Duplessis's arguments during the campaign mirrored those of the ALN even if Duplessis tried to assure that the Conservatives were less extreme and that "honest" capital would remain untouched in the province. Still, Duplessis remained distrustful of the ALN members, seeing them as unreliable men who would join the Liberals after the election and ruin his dream of heading the government himself. For that reason, he resisted all efforts to sign a coalition agreement with them, but was forced to yield on November 7, 1935. Several factors played a role. In October, the Liberals had an impressive showing in that year's federal election, and Taschereau called a snap provincial election in November to capitalize on this victory. Vote splitting issues in the first-past-the-post system also contributed to the overwhelming support for a coalition among party members and donors. Under the agreement, the Conservatives ran on the ALN's platform, joined a coalition called the Union Nationale and ceded two-thirds of ridings to the breakaway Liberals. The coalition narrowly failed to displace the Liberals from power, gaining 42 out of 90 seats (of which 16 were Conservative), but it managed to severely reduce the governing majority. Duplessis got safely reelected with a margin of 14 percentage points (1,202 votes).

==== Ascendancy of the Union Nationale ====
Le catéchisme des électeurs (The Voters' Catechism) was a question-and-answer booklet issued by the Union Nationale (in this case, the second edition in 1936) that presented the party's agenda while bashing the Liberals for corruption.

Maurice Duplessis continued his offensive in spring 1936, when he succeeded in having the parliamentary public accounts committee start an inquiry into the management of public funds by the Taschereau government. Numerous irregularities were uncovered as various Liberal government officials acknowledged having used the public money inappropriately. For example, Antoine Taschereau, premier's brother and accountant of the Quebec Legislature, was forced to resign when he admitted having pocketed interest from the government's bank deposits. The fact that the newspapers reported on all the smallest details of the inquiry made the committee job a political goldmine for Duplessis. Taschereau resigned amid the corruption scandals on June 11, 1936, and handed over the premiership to Adélard Godbout, who was forced to call an election on August 17.

The political situation during that year changed dramatically. Even though Duplessis entered the election as a junior coalition partner, his charisma, rhetorical skills and grilling of the Liberal officials has earned him support from most of ALN deputies, which could not be said of Gouin. On the organizational level, the Conservatives succeeded in capturing the Union Nationale brand for them. Moreover, the corruption inquiry severely weakened the governing party, which gave Duplessis a chance to single-handedly win the premiership. Therefore, on June 17, Duplessis announced his refusal to renew the coalition agreement even though the election writs had already been issued. Despite Gouin trying to campaign independently of Duplessis, 35 out of 42 Union Nationale coalition MLAs at a caucus meeting in Sherbrooke backed Duplessis's takeover of the coalition, and most of ALN's members joined the newly created Union Nationale party. Eventually, Gouin announced his "temporary" retirement from politics, which confirmed Duplessis's leadership. When the voters came to the polls, they delivered a landslide victory for the Union Nationale, handing it 76 out of 90 seats and ending the Liberal rule over Quebec that lasted for 39 years.

=== First term (1936–1939) ===
Duplessis immediately embarked on fulfilling some of the electoral promises. Among the programs that are credited with the longevity of the Union Nationale is the creation of the Farm Credit Bureau, which sent low-interest loans to rural areas and which proved popular with what would be the electoral base of his party. However, Duplessis emphatically refused to nationalize the producers of electricity and largely continued the economical policies of his predecessor. This provoked an exodus of former ALN members but it did not threaten Duplessis's majority.

Duplessis first rose to the highest office in the province in a difficult time, as the Great Depression ravaged through the province, leaving hundreds of thousands of people unemployed. Increased expenditures on social programs and lack of growth in the 1930s caused a severe budgetary crisis, as debt nearly doubled within his three years in office. The federal government started intervening in the province's finances to stabilize them, but Duplessis resisted these attempts as he thought they violated the principle of the provincial autonomy.

The Quebec government started handing out old-age pensions and approved workplace accident protections in its first year in office. Public works projects, such as the completion of the Montreal Botanical Garden, were also initiated. It was during this term that the legislation first recognized the right to a minimum salary for everyone (the "fair wage" standard, as it was known back then, previously applied to women only), but this law saw several problems in its implementation due to lack of uniformity and reluctance of trade unions to embrace it. In line with the Church's teaching, Duplessis launched a program of assistance to needy mothers (but not unwed, divorced or separated women), as well as to the blind and the orphaned. This cabinet saw the first Ministry of Health in Quebec, and it also financed the new Institute of Microbiology and Hygiene of Montreal, a research facility similar to Paris's Pasteur Institute.

The themes that unite both the pre-war and the post-war administration were anti-unionism and anti-communism. Duplessis introduced and had the Legislative Assembly pass the so-called Padlock Law. It granted Duplessis, in his capacity as Attorney General, the right to prosecute those arranging for, distributing or promoting communist materials and propaganda and lock down their properties. Due to the law's vagueness, it often was arbitrarily used against anyone considered an enemy of the administration, such as trade unions. Another law granted Duplessis's government the right to unilaterally amend any contract between the trade union and the employer, and yet another regulation banned closed shops and union shops.

On September 1, 1939, Germany invaded Poland in what is commonly recognized as the beginning of World War II. Duplessis decided to seize that opportunity and announced a snap election to cement his grip on power by rallying the population around the fears of conscription (which French Canadians overwhelmingly opposed in World War I). However, his gamble failed as the Liberals, whom he accused of wanting to send French Canadians to the frontline, declared their opposition to the plan. As the Union Nationale was also seen as unable to implement a coherent set of policies and it disappointed voters with the lack of reforms, the party's representation shrank to 15 out of 86 seats.

=== Return to the Official Opposition ===
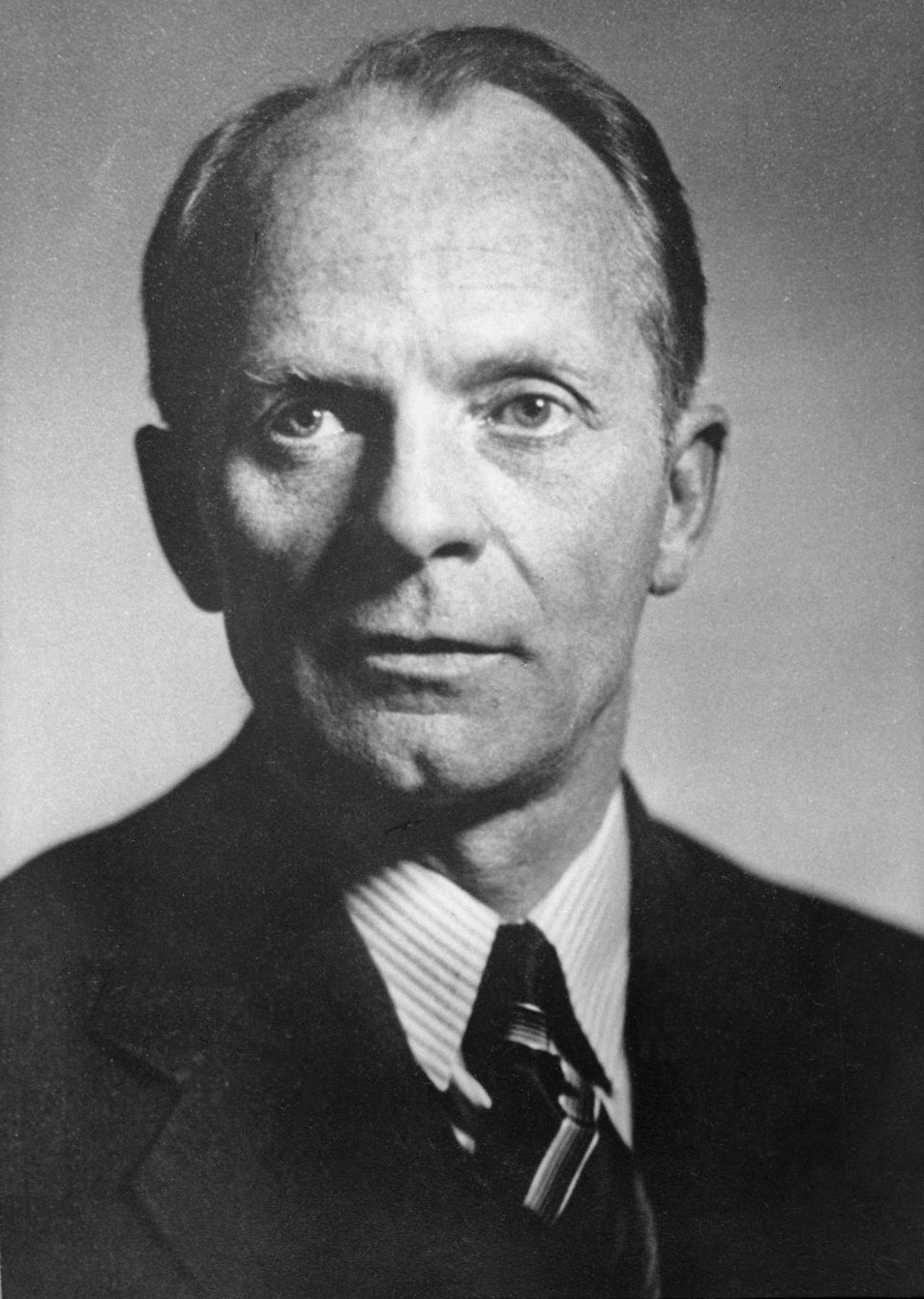
Adélard Godbout, leader of the Quebec Liberal Party 1936–1949, Premier of Quebec 1939–1944

The defeat of the Union Nationale meant that Duplessis's leadership was in danger. Some of his fellow MLAs were mad at his starting the election in an unfortunate moment, and the party was at the brink of implosion. Joseph-Damase Bégin called to convene a caucus meeting to consider changing the leader, with Onésime Gagnon and Hormisdas Langlais as possible contenders, but Duplessis successfully quashed the effort. Another challenge to his leadership came in 1942, when Duplessis was criticised for his alcoholic tendencies, as he would sometimes participate in parliamentary debates while completely drunk. That challenge was rebuffed as well as after his surgery on strangulated hernia in 1942, the leader of opposition decided to quit drinking altogether on his doctor's advice.

The Liberals introduced some progressive policies during their five years in power. In 1940, the Godbout administration granted women suffrage in provincial elections, which they already had on the federal level since 1917. Duplessis had previously considered the issue several times, but, unlike some of his colleagues, largely avoided discussing it and generally either abstained on the legislation or opposed it by voting "nay" or by trying to block the bill in committee. The 1940 vote was no different. Duplessis and most of his caucus voted "nay" (Note: Three people from his caucus: Gagnon, Langlais from the Legislative Assembly and Martin Fisher in the Legislative Council, broke ranks) as the leader of the Union Nationale aired concerns about an increase in government expenditures and electoral fraud that he connected to women's suffrage. He also accused Godbout of hypocrisy, as the Liberal leader previously opposed similar bills seven times.

Another landmark policy of the Liberals, the introduction of compulsory schooling from age six to fourteen in 1943, was prompted by a report noting high dropout rates after four years of formal schooling. As with the women's suffrage, the Union Nationale opposed the bill (only Camille Pouliot voted with the Liberals) and later on would not enforce its provisions during Duplessis's fifteen years in power. Finally, in 1944, Godbout created Hydro-Québec from the nationalization of Montreal Light, Heat & Power and its subsidiary Beauharnois Power, but Duplessis again opposed the initiative, saying that its timing just before the 1944 election suggested that it was a political campaign trick. He further disagreed with the details of its implementation – in his opinion, the takeover should have been made by Montreal rather than the provincial government. He also did not want to allocate taxpayer money to the nationalization and believed that negotiating prices between the government and the electricity companies was a better way to decrease them than assuming state ownership.

==== 1944 election ====
Just as with the 1935 elections, a third political force wanted to enter Quebec politics: the anti-conscriptionist Bloc populaire. It was a brainchild of such figures as Lionel Groulx and Georges Pelletier, the editor-in-chief of Le Devoir, and centered around André Laurendeau and Maxime Raymond, who were instrumental in what was effectively the defeat of the 1942 conscription plebiscite. A nationalist formation, it supported the nationalization of hydroelectricity and argued for more autonomy for Quebec; at the same time it drew inspirations from Catholic social teaching, corporatism and syndicalism. The party thus sought to compete for nationalist and anti-war votes with the Union Nationale, but at the same time advertising itself as a reform party to get Liberal votes.

Duplessis based his campaign on portraying the religious minorities, the federal government and the trade unions as threatening the province's interests, autonomy, traditions and identity. He also attacked Godbout's reforms as threatening the Church and the Catholic faith (Cardinal Villeneuve indeed disapproved of the legislation). During the campaign, Duplessis floated a false anti-Semitic conspiracy theory that asserted that the federal government, ruled by the Liberals, and the Quebec Liberals struck a secret deal with the so-called "International Zionist Brotherhood" to settle 100,000 Holocaust refugees in Quebec in exchange for campaign contributions. While Max Beer argues that this story did not influence the election result very much, the public and the press was enthusiastic about a leader who would not let any refugees arrive in Quebec. The business community, in its turn, was assured by his pledge to pursue development driven by private investments and opposition to state takeovers of companies. In the 1944 election, the Union Nationale received just over 38% of votes – the smallest share of votes in any election during his leadership – and finished behind the Liberals in the popular vote count. Still, Duplessis was able to form the government as vote splitting between the Bloc populaire and Godbout's party let the Union Nationale win 48 out of 91 seats.

=== Second to fifth terms (1944–1959) ===
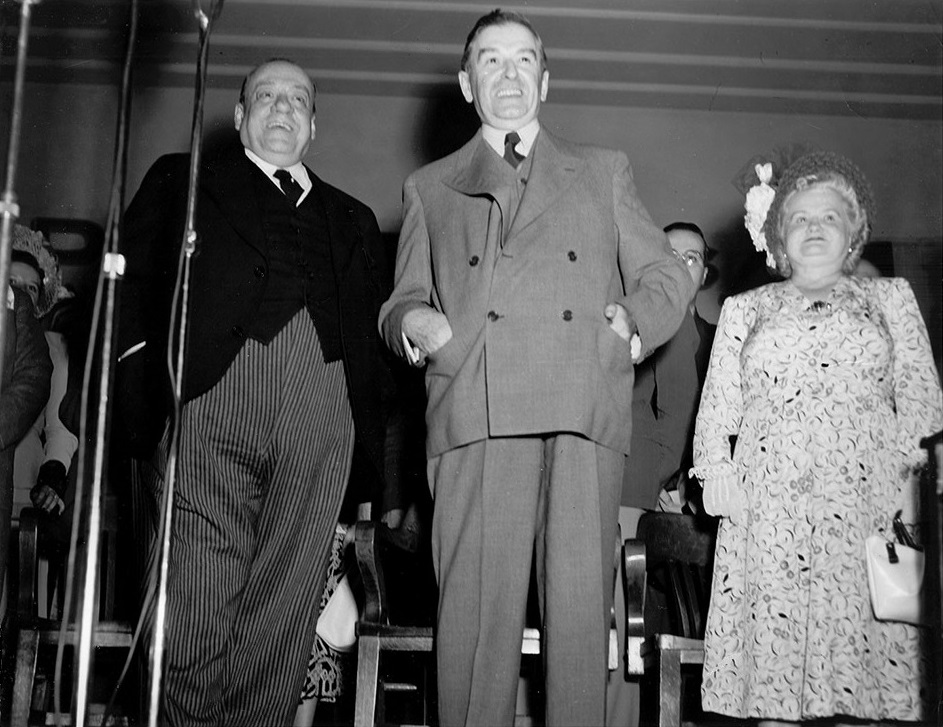
Public reconciliation of Camillien Houde (left) and Maurice Duplessis (centre) during a political assembly at Montreal's Saint-Jacques market in July 1948. Houde had previously come to good terms with Duplessis in 1944, when the long-time mayor of Montreal was arrested for resisting conscription.

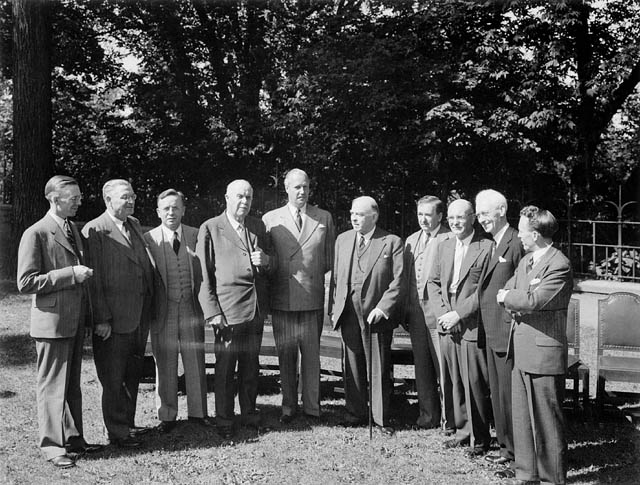
Duplessis (4th to the right) at the Dominion-Provincial Conference on Reconstruction, 1945 or 1946

Even though the majority of the Union Nationale seemed tenuous to his Liberal opponents, it eventually led to 15 years of uninterrupted rule over the province. This was common in post-war Canada as the incumbent governments were able to take credit for the strong economic performance and were often reelected on this basis. Several other factors specific to Quebec also helped in the longevity of his rule. The first was his personal charisma, which was so strong that the figure of Duplessis mattered much more than the party he represented. Another reason was his media-savvy team of talented campaign managers led by Joseph-Damase Bégin, his minister of colonization. The fact that the party secured a steady source of income from kickbacks from business entities helped implement the lavish campaign styles that the managers proposed. Threats to withdraw funds if the riding did not support the Union Nationale's candidate, malapportionment in favour of rural areas, which were the party's stronghold, and support from the high clergy further cemented the long reign of Duplessis.

The reign itself had some authoritarian tendencies. Even though the Legislative Assembly deliberated with all the usual organs, Duplessis was the de facto rulemaker in parliament. "Le Chef" enforced party discipline very strictly and, with very few exceptions, decision autonomy in the cabinet or in the Legislative Assembly was nonexistent. Duplessis, in his capacity as Attorney General, enforced censorship of creations deemed immoral, whether by statutory authorization or simply at his will. Media outlets suspected of sympathizing with the communists would be closed down and the property confiscated by virtue of the Padlock Act. As for newspapers, they would be ordered not to report on the Union Nationale's wrongdoings for fear of retribution from Duplessis. In order to appeal to the Catholic majority, Duplessis also engaged in a fight against Jehovah's Witnesses, whom he equated to Communists and the Nazis, though he ultimately lost court cases connected to them in the Supreme Court of Canada, notably Roncarelli v Duplessis.

Duplessis's rule was socially conservative. The regime generally enjoyed strong support from the high echelons of the Catholic Church, though lower-tier priests did not necessarily endorse him. The Church played an outsized influence in the lives of Quebeckers since it provided most healthcare and education services, something that would only change after 1960. A very able speaker who resorted to populism when necessary, he emphasized the importance of the preservation of what he believed were French Canadian values: the Catholic faith, the local traditions and the French language. In order to preserve them, he argued, Quebec had to defend its provincial autonomy from the encroachment of the federal government. It was usually done by means of refusing to participate in federal-provincial programs, which at that time mostly consisted of new welfare policies, but also through asserting its power to taxation, which Duplessis successfully did in 1955.

The post-war economic expansion defined the economic development of Quebec under Duplessis. Full employment stayed in the province for over a decade and average wages rose slightly faster than in the rest of Canada. GDP growth was fairly strong and was in a large degree as a result of a large stream of investment and general improvements in efficiency. The way Duplessis solicited the investments was consistent with economic liberalism. Quebec refused state intervention in resource extraction itself and thus relied heavily on out-of-province (English Canadian or American) capital to develop its rich natural resources. Duplessis attracted the money by using a combination of low taxes, low regulation and pro-employer labour policies. Trade unions in particular were a target of Duplessis's interventions. Duplessis had a consistent position of disincentivizing collective bargaining by passing unfavourable regulations for organized labour, which at the time was unique in Canada. When strike action did occur, the police were immediately deployed to break it (as was the case in Asbestos in 1949).

Quebec's management of the budget was fiscally conservative. The budget was balanced and provincial debt was decreasing. Even though the size of the budget increased substantially, "Le Chef" derided most attempts at welfare state in Quebec as "Anglo-Saxon and Protestant socialism"; instead, he called for charity to fill in the gaps. Ironically, by the end of Duplessis's rule, it was the federal government which footed most of the welfare bill in Quebec. The main investments of the era were the construction of hospitals and schools across the province, the increase of electricity supply via Hydro-Québec and development in rural areas (particularly through the Rural Electrification Office). Despite these investments, rural areas remained much poorer and less developed than urban areas, so Duplessis oversaw an exodus of rural population towards Montreal. Additionally, the situation of majority French Canadians still remained worse than that of the Anglophone minority. The reason was that the Anglophones dominated the business world of Montreal, the financial centre of Canada at the time, took most of the top jobs available and had substantial autonomy within the province.

=== Death, funeral and the end of the dominance of the Union Nationale ===
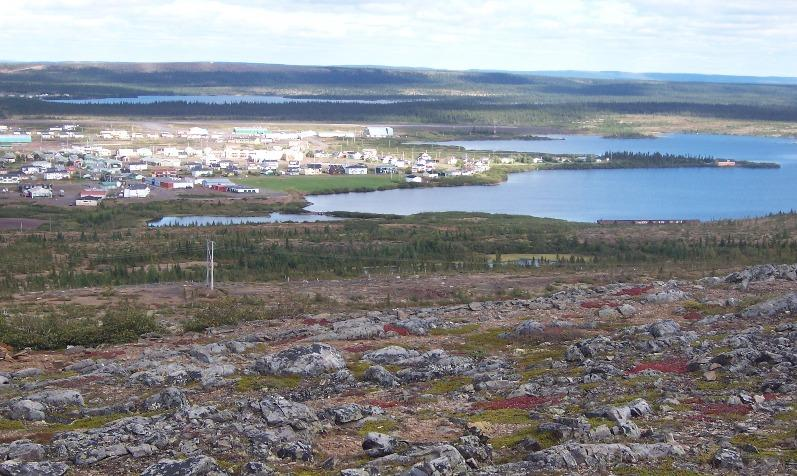
Schefferville as seen from the iron mine, September 2007

Duplessis suffered from numerous health problems throughout his life. He underwent two surgeries for a strangulated hernia in 1930 and 1942, which each ended in several-month-long stays in the hospital due to complications or other diseases slowing down his recovery. Duplessis was also hospitalized for a shorter period in 1929 for injuries he had sustained in a car accident. Duplessis had also been a heavy drinker, but on the advice of his doctor, pressure from his party and Adélard Godbout's suggestion that this "weakness was going to ruin [Duplessis]", became a teetotaller after his second surgery. Also in 1942, doctors diagnosed Duplessis with diabetes, which particularly caused trouble in the last years of his life.

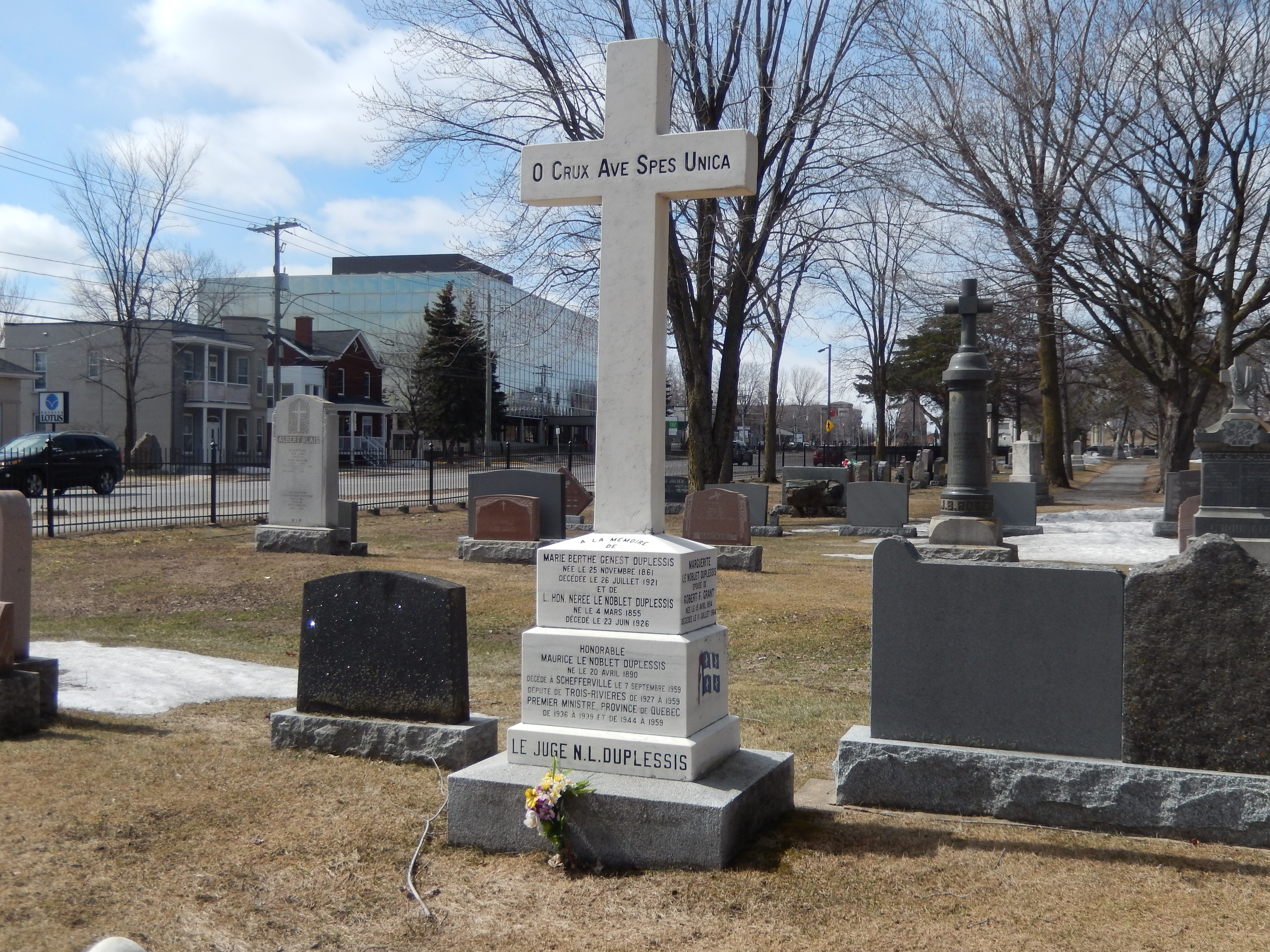
A memorial cross on the Duplessis family grave on the Saint Louis Cemetery of Trois-Rivières. The flag of Quebec, adopted by Duplessis's order in council in 1948, can be seen to the right.

By the end of 1958, in the middle of his fourth term, Duplessis's health started to deteriorate significantly and he struggled to keep on with the prior habits of his premiership. Doctors warned him that he was overstretching himself and needed some rest, but "Le Chef" went on with his duties. Sometime before September 2, 1959, Duplessis accepted an invitation from Quebec Iron, a subsidiary of the Iron Ore Company of Canada, to travel to Schefferville to see its mines. The flight to Sept-Îles and then the mining town was uneventful, but at about lunch time on September 3, while staying in the company's guesthouse, Duplessis suffered a bleeding stroke, which paralyzed his right leg and arm and sent him into a barely conscious state; three more strokes occurred by September 4. After balancing on the verge of life for two more days, Duplessis died on September 7 at 12:01 AM EDT.

External media

Audio
- Remembering "Le Chef" Duplessis – a eulogy by Prime Minister John Diefenbaker, September 1959

Video
- Les funérailles de Duplessis, video about the funeral of the Premier, Radio-Canada, September 10, 1959
- La revue de l'année 1959, video reviewing the most important events of 1959, Radio-Canada, January 1, 1960

The body was placed in a coffin covered by the flag of Quebec, which he had introduced by an Order in Council in 1948. The coffin arrived to Quebec City by plane at 6:10 am. Duplessis's body was then embalmed and laid in state in the building of the Legislative Assembly. About 100,000 people arrived to pay homage for the late premier until September 10, when the body was transported to his hometown of Trois-Rivières. The funeral service in the Assumption Cathedral of that city, officiated by Cardinal Paul-Émile Léger, Archbishop of Montreal, and Archbishop Maurice Roy of Quebec, was attended by eleven members of the federal cabinet, including Prime Minister John Diefenbaker, all of the provincial cabinet and the Lieutenant Governor of Quebec, three fellow premiers, nine bishops and archbishops and other high officials. Another 50,000 people paid respects to Duplessis in his hometown, after which he was buried alongside his parents.

On the evening of September 10, 1959, the caucus of the Union Nationale proposed to the Lieutenant Governor that Paul Sauvé be sworn in as premier, which he was on the morning of the following day. The time of his rule is widely known as that of "désormais" (from now on) and seen as a break from his predecessor. That said, despite the several reforms that have been implemented in the short "100 days", as the period is also known, Sauvé stressed his loyalty to the legacy of Duplessis and portrayed his rule as the continuation of what Duplessis was doing. Antonio Barrette, who succeeded Sauvé after the latter's death in January 1960, also continued the same policies. However, the frequent changes of power threw the Union Nationale into disarray just before the planned election in June, which Jean Lesage's Liberals won. This defeat of the Union Nationale started the Quiet Revolution.

=== Private life ===
Duplessis was a lifelong bachelor and had no children. In fact, "Le Chef" would tell people that he had no family and that his only responsibility was the welfare of his province, to which he said he belonged. For most of his political life, Duplessis lived alone in Château Frontenac. Conrad Black suggests that during World War I Duplessis courted Augustine Delisle, a daughter of a prosperous coal trader, but his family disapproved of a connection that would unite them with a family of merchants. This upset him and it was probably then that he decided never to marry anyone. Duplessis still remained close to his sisters as well as their husbands. He also became a godfather to a daughter of Antonio Talbot, the minister of roads in his post-war government.

In his later life, his relationships with other women were quite idiosyncratic. He believed that he had to behave in a strictly aristocratic and gentlemanly manner towards them but his convictions did not prevent him from making risqué comments about women in their presence. In general, Duplessis would more and more feel as if he were part of aristocracy and behave and dress accordingly even though he had no blood relation with it. Conrad Black suggests that hypospadias could also have affected his relationships with women.

Despite a populist image "Le Chef" created in public and rumours that persisted even after his death, his hobbies included opera and literature. He enjoyed historical or political books the most, but he also read classical French or English-language authors, such as Rudyard Kipling, Tennyson and Shakespeare. (Note: For the contents of his library and suggestions about the typical books he read, see) Later in his life, Duplessis developed a taste for paintings and started collecting them. At his death, his sister Jeanne-L. Balcer-Duplessis inherited the works of art, which she donated to the provincial government in exchange for the cancellation of the inheritance tax. Most of the paintings, including those by Clarence Gagnon, Cornelius Krieghoff, J. M. W. Turner, Auguste Renoir, Charles Jacque, Cornelis Springer and Johan Jongkind, are stored in the National Museum of Fine Arts of Quebec. On the other hand, his love of sport was not unequivocal. In fact, Duplessis had not practised any in his life, except for croquet. However, he was a fan of the Montreal Canadiens and was also an avid supporter of the New York Yankees.

== Historical debate ==
Duplessis is recognized as one of the most colourful, if controversial, people in Canadian politics. His figure already polarized the political landscape of Quebec during his life, and it continued to do so well after his death. Even today, few politicians dare to emphasize the continuity of their policies with those of Duplessis for fear of being ridiculed as the rule of Duplessis generally has negative connotations in Quebec society. Opinions about him are so strong that being compared to Duplessis may be considered an insult. This was already the case shortly after the Union Nationale's downfall in 1960, when Léon Dion urged the province to reject its heritage and undergo a revolution. The new generation of adults which emerged in the 1980s, who did not have appreciable contact with either Duplessis or the events of the 1960s, associated Duplessis with negative phenomena much more than the positive ones.

=== Duplessis as the incarnation of the Grande Noirceur ===
External media

Audio
- Battle of the historians, a discussion on the legacy of Maurice Duplessis between Conrad Black and Léandre Bergeron, CBC, 1974 (22m 44s)
- CBC interviews Montrealers about the news that René Lévesque wants to place a monument to Duplessis, together with an interview of a journalist of Le Soleil, 1977
- CBC interviews inhabitants of Trois-Rivières about Duplessis, 1974

Video
- Re-evaluating Duplessis, a CBC report, 1999 (2m 51s)
- Radio-Canada interviews with several political opponents of Duplessis

Intellectual circles were not kind to Duplessis, even during his life. Pierre Trudeau would write in Cité Libre that Duplessis did not tax enough on the provincial level and this enabled the federal government's invasion of provincial autonomy and deprived Quebeckers of the needed social services. In Le Devoir, André Laurendeau penned an editorial, La théorie du roi nègre (The Theory of the Negro King). It posited that foreign capital allowed Duplessis to stay in power so that he could officially allow to ruthlessly exploit the province of Quebec. The role of Duplessis was along the lines of the "Negro Kings", the local chieftains whom the British allowed some control over their area but who had to recognize the supremacy of their overlords.

Criticism of "Le Chef" intensified following his death. Shortly before the 1960 elections, Pierre Laporte published the first biography after Duplessis's death, which portrayed him as an intelligent but ruthless politician who would stay in power through corruption and repression of political opponents. Leslie Roberts' book outright called Duplessis a "Latin-American dictator" who would cater to the simplistic desires of French Canadians but failed to lift them from the state of inferiority with respect to the Anglophones. The Quiet Revolution was viewed as an enlightened response to the politics embodied by Duplessis, to the degree that the Duplessis era is associated with the label Grande Noirceur (Great Darkness).

Interpretations behind the label and even the dates of the beginning of this "shameful" period vary, but generally revolve around the criticism of defending a regressive model of society, blocking progress and leaving patronage and corruption entrenched. In defending the label, Jacques Godbout described the period of Duplessis as that of "perverse control of sexuality, contempt for the industry, art, economy and rejection of the scientific thought" and said that in intellectual circles, the Grande Noirceur was also a period of grand silence (great silence) and of grande peur (great fear). Among other supporters of this interpretation were trade unionist Madeleine Parent, who was imprisoned for her advocacy in 1955 and ultimately acquitted of the charge of "seditious conspiracy"; Gérard Pelletier, also a union organizer, who described Duplessis's views as those of a "19th-century rural notary"; and Jacques Hébert. Yves Vaillancourt, who analyzed the period from the perspective of administration of welfare, stated that social justice was in disrepair and that the government of Duplessis was at fault for causing this problem. The Grande Noirceur view is also present in some English-language scholarly books that describe that era.

=== Challenging the Grande Noirceur label ===
In the 1970s, despite an overwhelmingly negative coverage of "Le Chef", two biographies cast him in a very positive light. Robert Rumilly, who defended Duplessis's policies throughout his life, including by writing propaganda pieces on the Union Nationale's behalf, penned a biography of Duplessis published in 1973. Conrad Black's biography, published in 1977, just like Rumilly's, received substantial criticism from the historians of the time. (Note: For a contemporary example of such criticism, see Durocher, René (1977). "L'histoire partisane: Maurice Duplessis et son temps vus par Robert Rumilly et Conrad Black". Revue d'histoire de l'Amérique française (in French). 31 (3): 407–426. doi:10.7202/303636ar. ISSN 0035-2357.) However, with time, the 1977 biography became more and more accepted. Today, the books are either considered reliable even if they are biased and have some methodological issues, or, alternatively, flawed but usable, particularly given that no historian wrote a similar biography after them. In short, Rumilly praised his devotion to the Catholic Church and defended his fight against "subversive" organizations, such as trade unions. Black, on the other hand, believed that Duplessis was an able politician who managed to modernize the province even while defending traditional values; the latter then further clarified that in his view, the Québécois owe their prosperity to Duplessis as he used the money saved from underpaying teachers and nurses to make infrastructural investments.

The next wave of change came with the researchers of the 1980s and the 1990s, who challenged the then dominant idea of Duplessism as something awful and to be avoided, which was how historians who personally witnessed the Quiet Revolution often viewed it. The movement did not want to revise history as in rewriting the facts about that period, but rather changing the perspectives on it, giving different interpretations and assigning different weights to the events. This started with the publication of the synthesis of the history of Quebec by Linteau et al. (named Quebec Since 1930 in the English edition). It emphasized that Quebec, in fact, was developing in line with the rest of North America and the West in general; issues specific to Quebec, like the dominant influence of Catholic Church, were not as important as previously assumed or reported. In 1994, Bourque et al. published another book that argued that, contrary to common belief, the Duplessis government was actually liberal in its outlook as it embraced economic progress and modern capitalism and did not oppose liberal democracy, all while pushing back against the welfare state and staying within traditional values of Quebec. This interpretation was challenged by numerous historians, who variously argued that the regime was conservative if not illiberal in its nature. Among those who changed their opinion of the regime in the course of the years was Léon Dion, who wrote in 1993 that the assessment of the period as the Grande Noirceur (as he and like-minded scholars proposed in the 1960s) was unreasonably harsh and his policies on the economy, such as the development of Northern Quebec, were reasonable or at least justifiable. He also argued that the blame for the regime's regressiveness should be also laid on the Catholic Church and on society, which wanted order and security and thus tolerated oppression. Dion also tends to agree on the validity of Duplessis's defence of provincial autonomy, in line with other historians, such as Yves Vaillancourt and Xavier Gélinas.

In today's historiography of Quebec (at least since the 1990s), most scholars express the opinion that the notion of Grande Noirceur was a myth invented by those who embraced or spearheaded the Quiet Revolution in the 1960s. Alexandre Dumas writes that the notion of the Quiet Revolution can only live with the "anti-hero" Duplessis and the association with the Great Darkness. Michel Sarra-Bournet and Gérard Bouchard suggested that the portrayal of Duplessis's era as a Great Darkness unique to Quebec may be unjustified as contemporary governments of Ontario, Manitoba and New Zealand shared many characteristics with Duplessis's rule, such as resistance to the welfare state, anti-communism, corruption scandals and the focus on rural development. A similar opinion was expressed by Jocelyn Létourneau. Yet other historians emphasize in their opinions that the "rupture" between the Quiet Revolution and Duplessis is not present in every aspect of Quebec's life, is generally exaggerated or even artificially created, or else that it should be better thought of as a transitionary period. Some authors go as far as rejecting the label altogether as a "gross caricature", framing this period as that of the "Great Catch-Up", in comparison to the "Quiet Decline" that followed the death of "Le Chef", or even, as in the case with Éric Bedard, merging the periods of Duplessis and that of the Quiet Revolution into a single "Quiet Reconquest".

=== Attempts at comparison ===
The ideology of Duplessis and the Union Nationale between 1936 and 1959 was subject to numerous studies, and several comparisons have been proposed. A 1984 paper by George Steven Swan found many similarities between the policies of Duplessis and those of Huey Long, a left-populist American politician from Louisiana, and of Juan Perón of Argentina, in particular as they related to authoritarian practices. Léon Dion, in some similarity to Leslie Roberts, argued that his rule could be compared to that of Latin American dictators, though occasional comparisons to fascism, in his opinion, were wrong. Frédéric Boily dismissed that reasoning as simplistic, because it implied that Duplessis was a populist along the lines of Perón and Brazil's Getúlio Vargas. Instead, he argues that Duplessis was not truly populist but simply made good use of populist rhetoric. Jean-Philippe Warren wrote that his style of governance could be compared to a type of regime called "authoritarian democracy". However, Gilles Bourque opined that the comparison is inaccurate as the rule of Duplessis bears little similarity to the regime of Vladimir Putin in Russia, which would also be an "authoritarian democracy" under Warren's definition. Catherine Frost saw many similarities between Duplessis and Éamon de Valera in comparing the nationalism in Ireland and that of Quebec. Greame Orr and Ron Levy found that Duplessis's and Queensland Premier Joh Bjelke-Petersen's regimes have so much in common that they suggest that Bjelke-Petersen might have studied Duplessis's politics before implementing his policies in that Australian state. They noted the heavy-handed approach both used for trade unions and communists, their strong anti-federalist rhetoric (even if Duplessis stopped short of advocating separatism) and extensive malapportionment that they conclude was gratuitous. With respect to Duplessis's staunch anti-communism, his policies were also likened to those of US Senator Joseph McCarthy.

In the context of Quebec, some historians compared Mario Dumont, with his Action démocratique du Québec (ADQ), to Duplessis. Among the suggested similarities were the party's program mirroring that of the Union Nationale, ADQ's emphasis on provincial autonomy and the (rather successful) usage of populist rhetoric at times when the electorate was tired of the prior state of politics. Dumont himself said he was flattered by the comparison, though he also suggested that he preferred Jean Lesage references. More recently, the current premier of Quebec, François Legault, has been compared to Duplessis, and his Coalition Avenir Québec party to the Union Nationale. In fact, in 2014, Legault underlined that his party bore resemblance to the Union Nationale, though he assured voters they would not be returning to the grande noirceur. When CAQ won a majority of seats, Legault participated in a heated parliamentary debate defending Duplessis's legacy. In this incident from 2021, the co-leader of the left-wing Québec solidaire party, Gabriel Nadeau-Dubois, meant to demean the leader of the CAQ by comparing him to Duplessis and accused Legault of excluding those Quebec residents who opposed Bill 21 from the definition of who is Québécois and of assuming the role of "the father of the Quebec nation". The premier retorted that while, in his opinion, Duplessis had many faults, he defended Quebec, unlike the "woke" Nadeau-Dubois.

== Commemoration ==
=== In culture and collective memory of the Québécois ===
Immediately after the death of Duplessis, provincial politicians took pains to preserve the memory of "Le Chef". A provincial riding was created in 1960 from parts of Saguenay (now René-Lévesque) electoral district. The following year, Boulevard Champigny, a major thoroughfare in Quebec City, was renamed after Duplessis, and is now alternatively known as Autoroute 540. Boulevard Maurice-Duplessis in the northeastern part of the Island of Montreal was named that way in 1967. The government was also interested in building a monument, but it did not go according to plan. In December 1959, Paul Sauvé passed a law in the Quebec Legislature that envisaged building a monument to Maurice Duplessis and placing it somewhere in the city of Quebec. This was unusual at the time as before 1980, it was the government (via the Ministry of Public Works) that decided on the decorations next to the Parliament Building, and also since Honoré Mercier was the only provincial politician with a statue in front of the Legislative Assembly. By summer 1961, Joseph-Émile Brunet, who had already sculpted a bust of Duplessis, made the monument ready, but the government of Jean Lesage ordered to hide it. When journalists inquired about the statue, the government asserted that this was an effort to avoid political tensions. Therefore, the first statue of Le Chef was unveiled in 1964 in Trois-Rivières by the Société des amis de Maurice L. Duplessis, a private organization dedicated to the preservation of Duplessis's heritage. The Society was then commemorating the fifth anniversary of his death. (Note: The Society also maintains a recreation of Duplessis's work cabinet in the nearby Boucher-De Niverville Mansion. In addition to that, this organization holds the private collections and archives of Duplessis, but access to them is restricted. As of 2018, they are stored in the building of the Séminaire de Trois-Rivières, where Duplessis was a student.)

Government commemoration of Duplessis lost steam as the Quiet Revolution progressed and the general populace evolved a negative view of the Duplessis's reign. By the time Jean-Jacques Bertrand, also of the Union Nationale, became premier in 1968, even the party's supporters relegated Duplessis to the subconscious. "Le Chef" came again under the spotlight in the 1970s, with numerous books about his rule for academic and general public circulation alike (including the two biographies by Rumilly and Black). A very successful play called Charbonneau et le Chef by John Thomas McDonough, describing the Asbestos strike, appeared in Quebec City's theatres in 1971. Denys Arcand treated him extensively in his early film career: in 1972, he directed Québec: Duplessis et après for the National Film Board of Canada, and, six years later, he was a screenwriter for the TV series Duplessis, which was released on the screens of Radio-Canada. Both proved quite sympathetic to "Le Chef" and minimized the supposed rupture between Duplessis and the events that happened after his death. In 1974, Parks Canada designated Duplessis as a Person of National Historic Significance. Three years later, and 18 years after the Legislative Assembly decreed so, Premier René Lévesque retrieved Brunet's monument from storage and unveiled it next to the Parliament Building. Lévesque's Parti Québécois held this event to attract Union Nationale supporters. The preparation copies of the monument are stored in the Museum of Fine Arts of Quebec.

Landmarks associated with, or named after, Maurice Duplessis

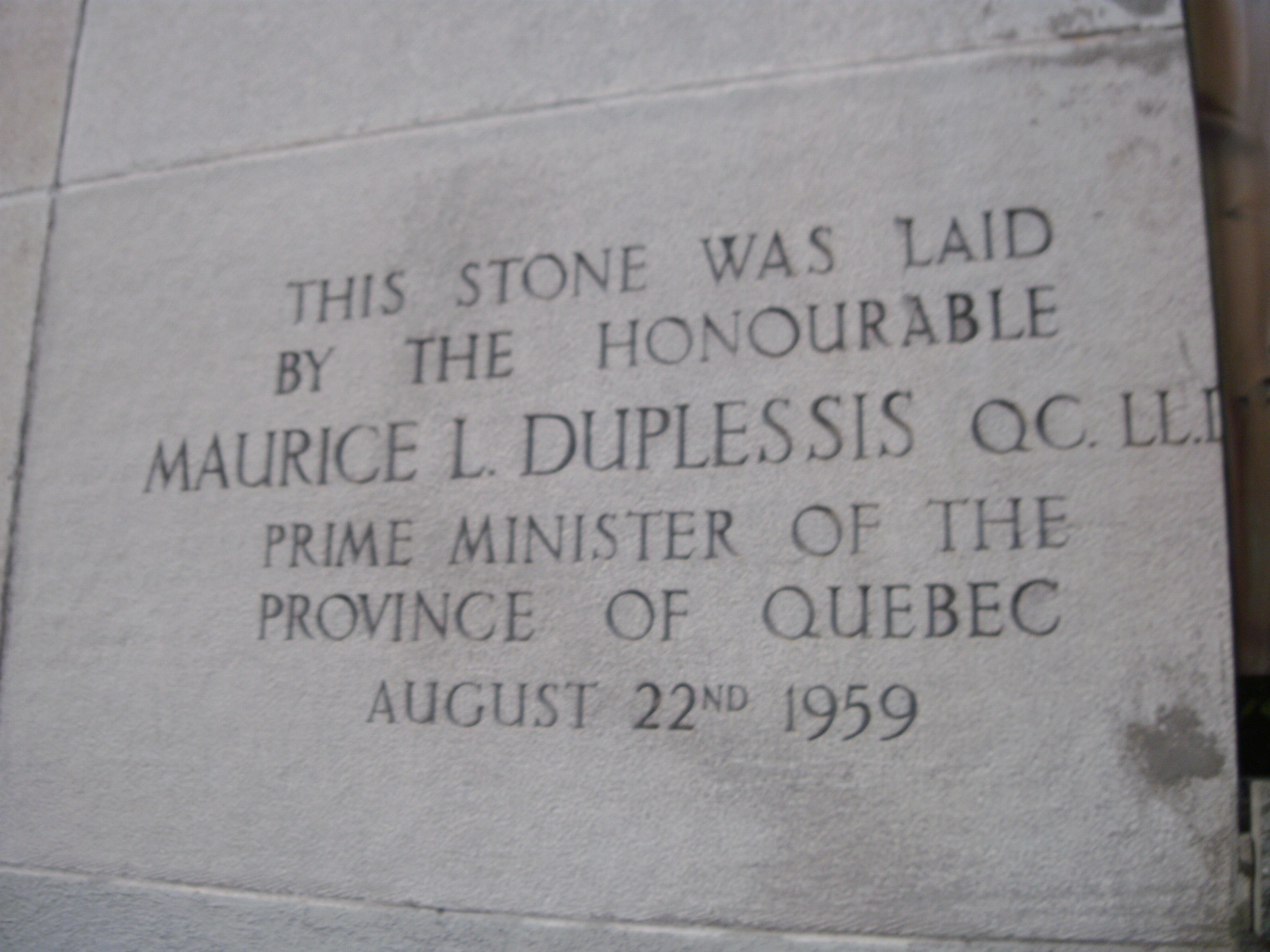
A stone laid by Maurice Duplessis during the inauguration of the Queen Elizabeth II Hospital in Montreal, August 1959

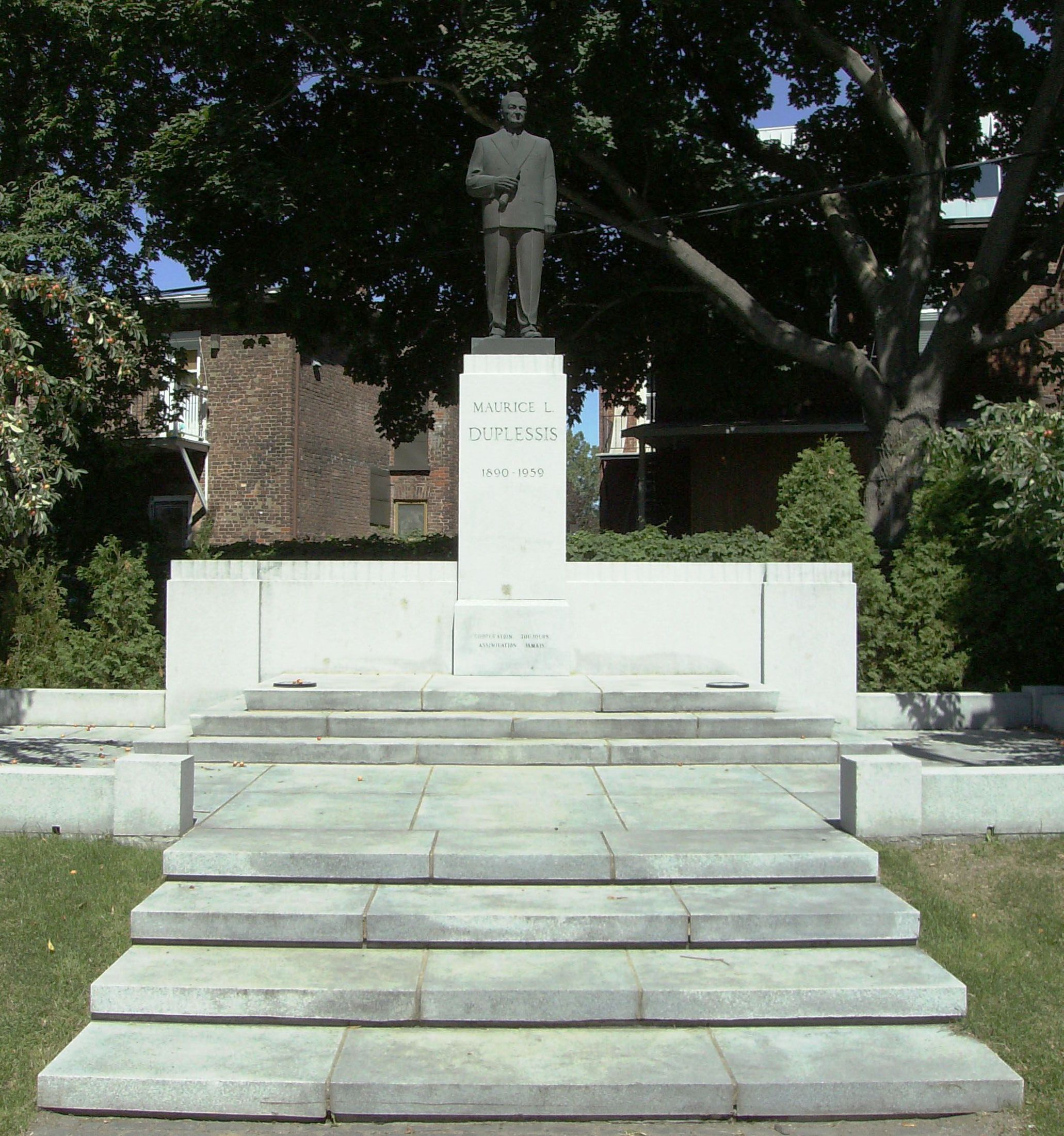
Statue of Maurice Duplessis in Trois-Rivières (1964). The French on the bottom of the pedestal says "Cooperation always – assimilation never!".

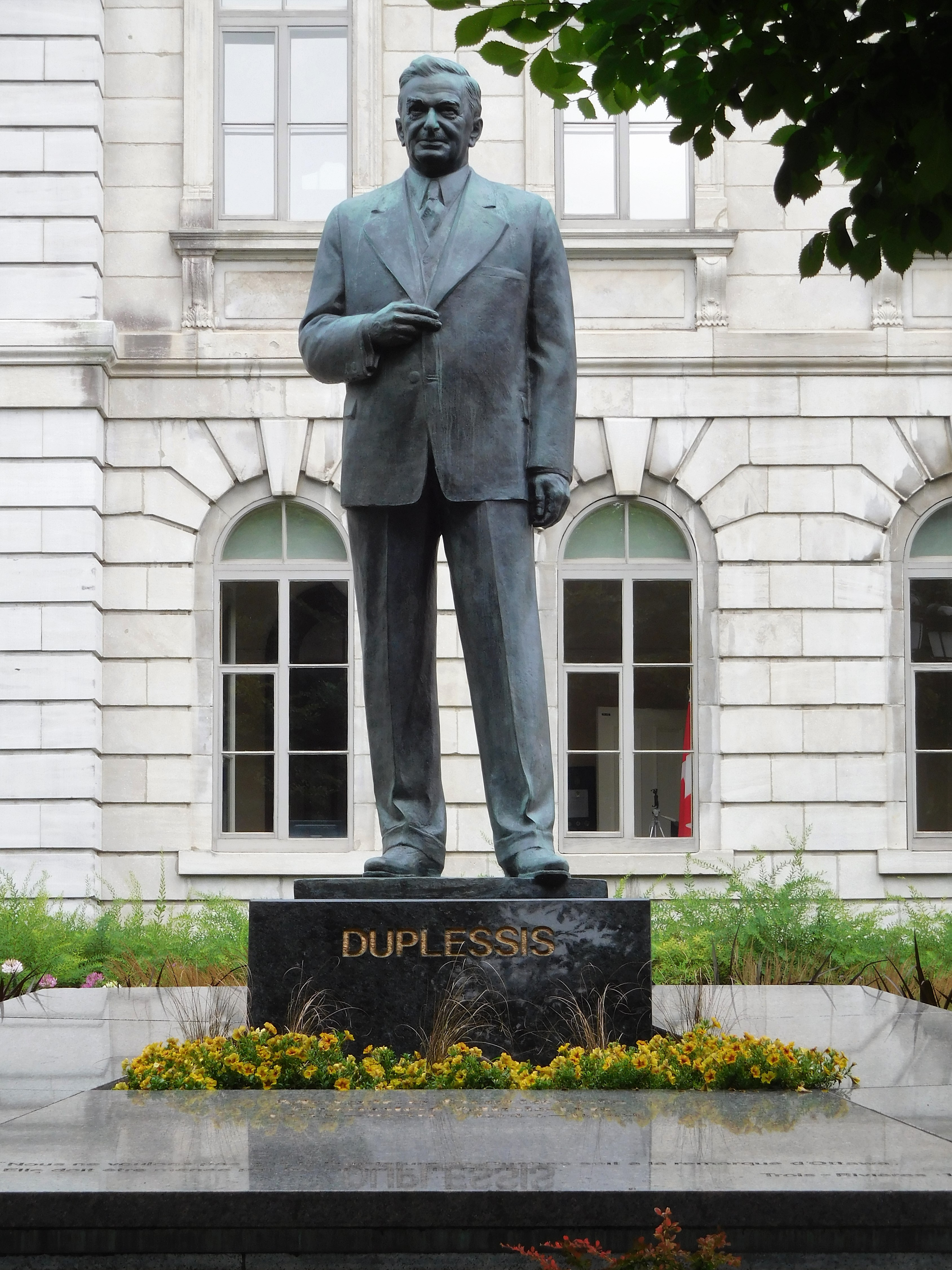
Statue of Maurice Duplessis next to the National Assembly building (1977)

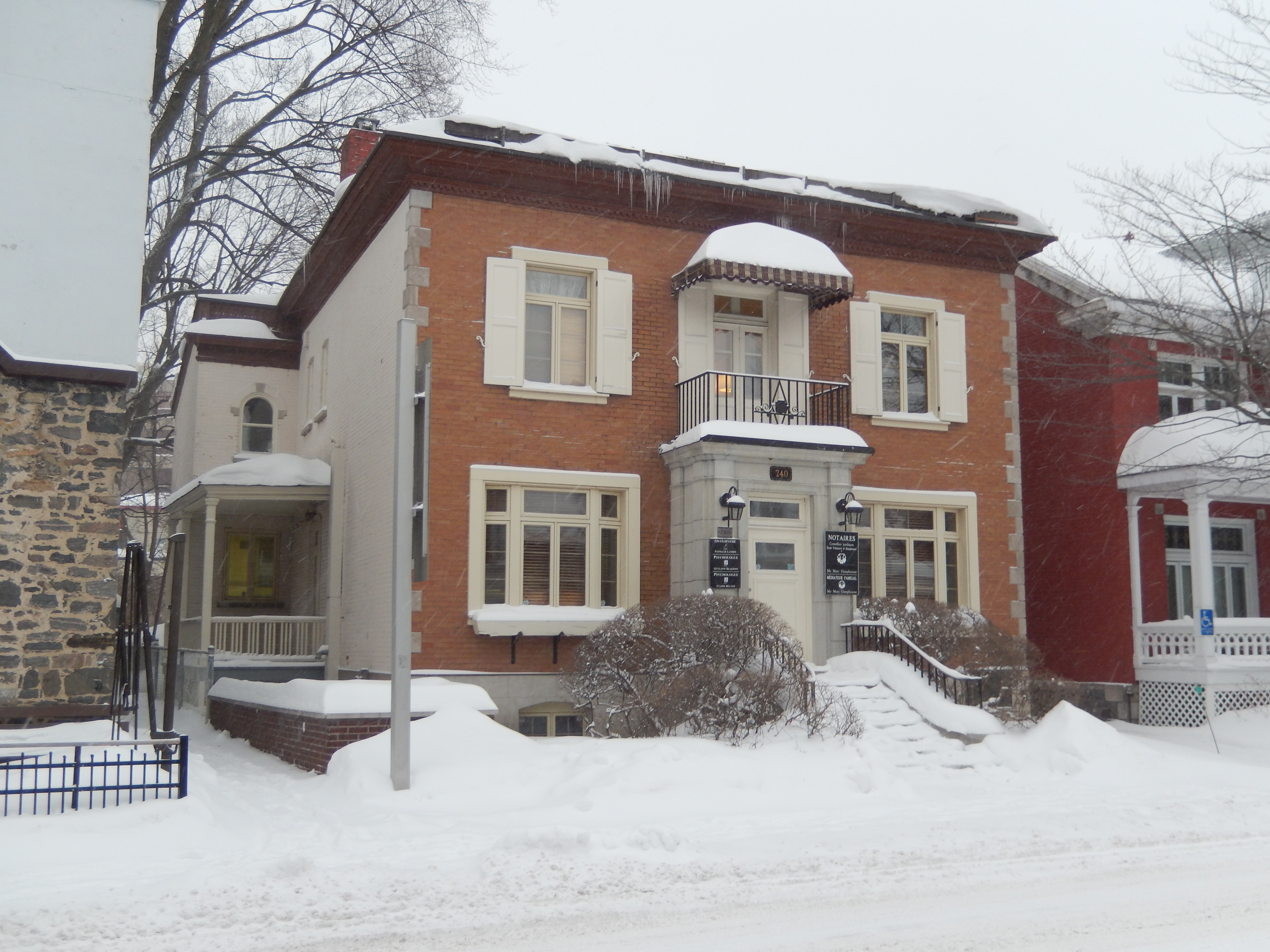
A building that belonged to Maurice Duplessis, at 240 Bonaventure Street in Trois-Rivières. His law office was located in the basement.

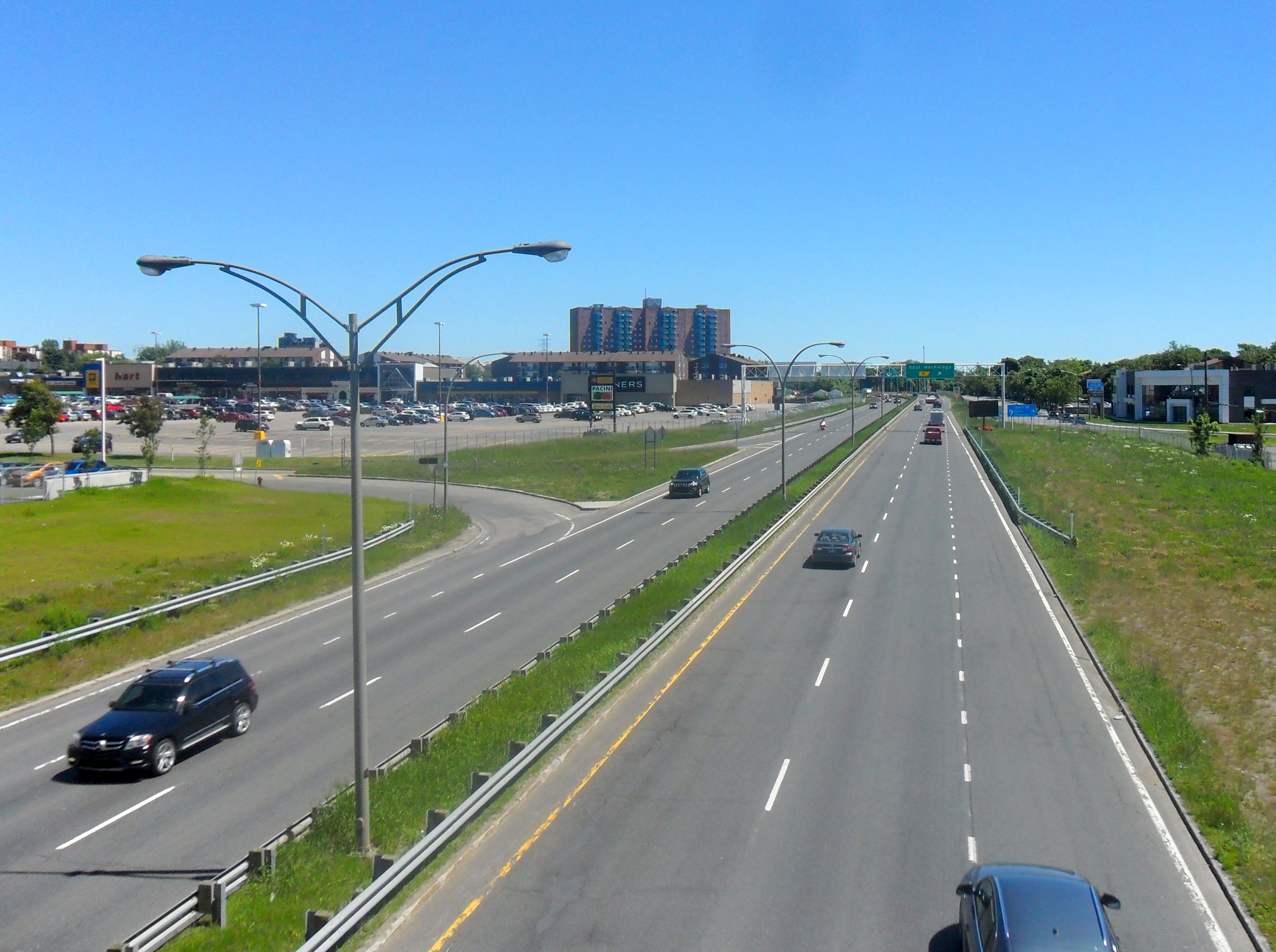
Autoroute 540 (alternatively Autoroute Maurice-Duplessis) in Quebec City

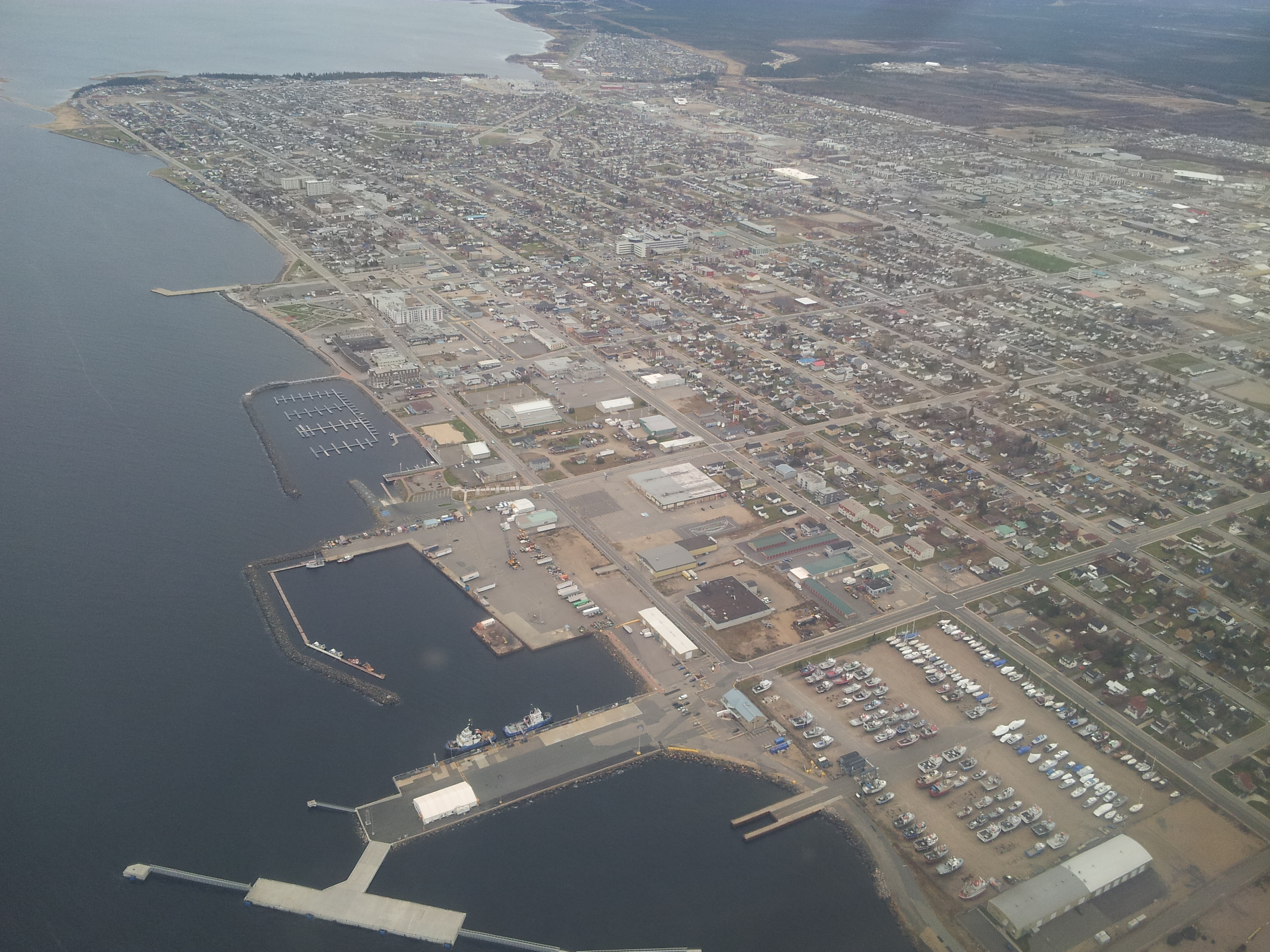
Sept-Îles is the largest city within the provincial riding of Duplessis, located in the Côte-Nord region of Quebec.

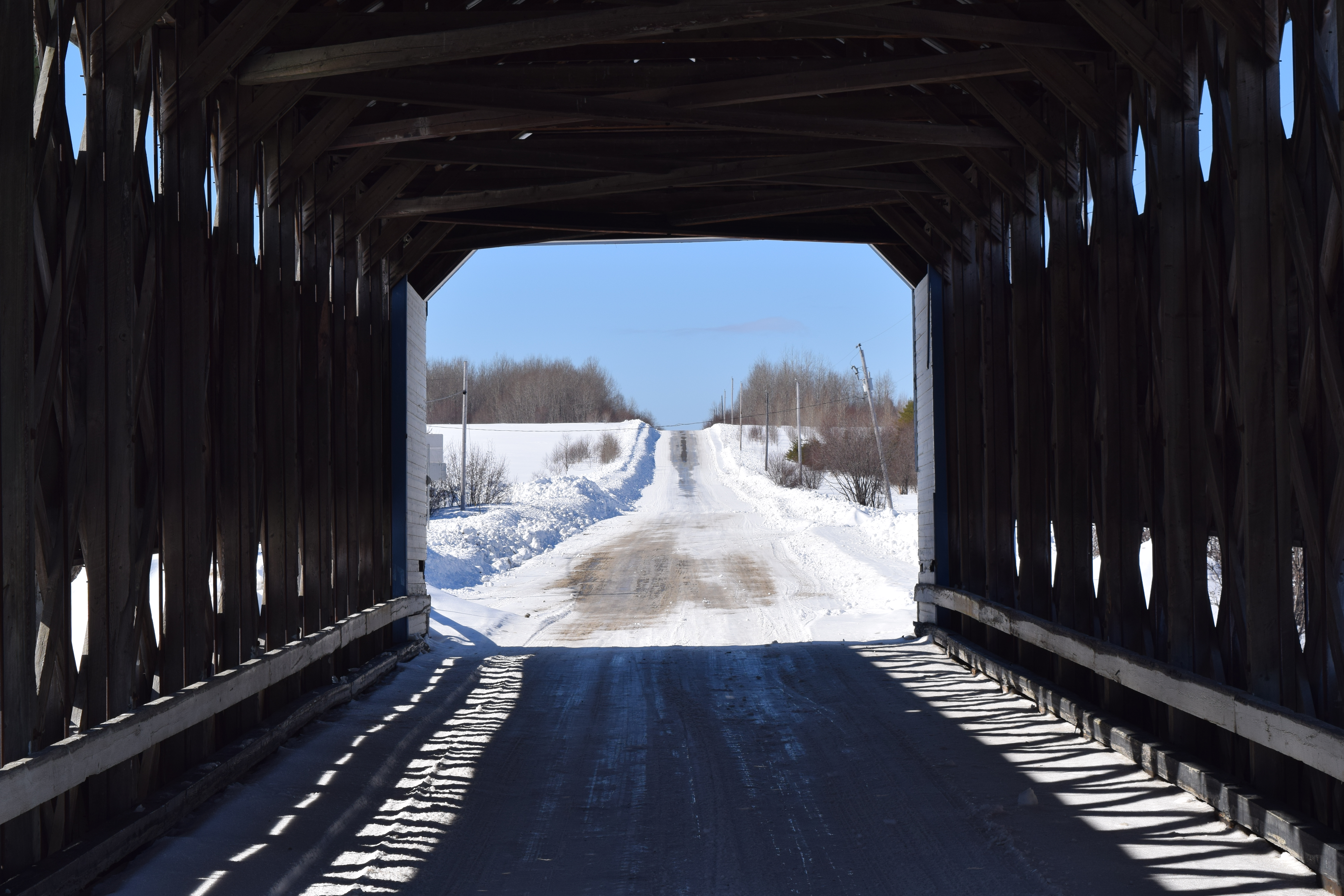
The interior part of Maurice Duplessis Bridge, located near Villebois, Quebec. Apart from this, several streets, parks and other objects across the province are named in his honour.

The Grande Noirceur beer label

In the 1980s, the negative coverage of Duplessis in the arts still continued. Among these works was a collection of feminist articles by Andrée Yanacopoulo, Au nom du père, du fils et de Duplessis, and a TV series called Asbestos. Michel Tremblay's Le gars de Québec (1985), set in 1952, draws inspiration from Gogol's The Government Inspector and has rather critical references to the era. In the words of Pierre Berthelot, a simple mention of his name was enough to create his invisible yet oppressive presence that made characters stuck in their hardships and which treated them to government agents' abuses. Quebec did not become interested in Duplessis's heritage in the 1980s despite the otherwise favourable climate for conservative politicians. The Union Nationale, then under the stewardship of Roch La Salle, distanced itself from the heritage of Maurice Duplessis and lost all seats in the 1981 election. After that, the party maintained a nominal presence in provincial politics before being finally disbanded in 1989. The 1990s proved even worse for his memory as a documentary in 1997, Les Orphelins de Duplessis, made the abuses committed against the Duplessis Orphans known to a wide public and further entrenched the image of Duplessis's era as that of the Great Darkness.

In the 21st century, with the exception of some non-scholarly authors like Martin Lemay, a former Parti Québécois member of the National Assembly, the negative image of the era persisted. The student protests of 2012, often known as "Maple Spring", were a manifestation of that trend. Gabriel Nadeau-Dubois, then one of the leaders of the protests, suggested that the government's Bill 78, which aimed to suppress protests, was a return to the times of Duplessis. Participants in the demonstrations also painted a graffiti saying, in rough translation: "Come back Duplessis, you've left your pigs!", in protest against the use of riot police. A microbrewery called Dieu du Ciel! of Saint-Jérôme produces a variety of dark beer called Grande Noirceur with suggestive imagery – a caricature appearance of "Le Chef" manipulating the assembled population with strings (as if they were puppets), with church towers behind him.

=== Honorary titles ===
Duplessis held some top positions in relation to his law career. On December 30, 1931, he received the title of King's Counsel due to his achievements in the field of law. In addition to that, he was elected President (bâtonnier) of the Bar of Quebec and President of the Bar of Trois-Rivières for the 1937–1938 term, which, in addition to conferring prestige to the Premier, gave him some influence over the internal order of the bar. Several universities granted him honorary degrees, including Université Laval (three times: apart from a law degree in 1937 and forestry sciences in 1955, a general honorary doctorate was granted in 1952), McGill University (law, 1948), Université de Montréal (law, 1953), Université de Sherbrooke (law, 1956), as well as from Bishop's University and the University of Caen in France.

Maurice Duplessis also received several decorations. In 1948, Argentine President Juan Perón gave Duplessis the highest decoration, the Grand Cross of the Order of the Liberator General San Martín, which provoked a minor diplomatic incident as the government of Canada had advised foreign emissaries not to give any such distinctions to its citizens. Other awards that "Le Chef" received include a golden star of the Ordre national du mérite agricole (1946), a provincial order for people who contributed to the development of agriculture, and the induction in the Commonwealth's Order of Saint John.

== Notes ==
Party political offices
Preceded by Camillien Houde	Leader of the Quebec Conservative Party; 1933–1936*	Succeeded by none
Preceded by none	Leader of the Union Nationale; 1935*–1959	Succeeded by Paul Sauvé
Political offices
Preceded by Charles Ernest Gault (Conservative)	Leader of the Opposition in Quebec; 1932–1936	Succeeded by T.-D. Bouchard (Liberal)
Preceded by T.-D. Bouchard (Liberal)	Leader of the Opposition in Quebec	Succeeded by Adélard Godbout (Liberal)
