= St. Lawrence (electoral district) =

Former federal electoral district in Quebec, Canada

Quebec electoral district

Defunct federal electoral district
- Legislature: House of Commons
- District created: 1892
- District abolished: 1914
- First contested: 1896
- Last contested: 1911

St. Lawrence (French: Saint-Laurent) was a federal electoral district in Quebec, Canada, that was represented in the House of Commons of Canada from 1892 to 1917.

This riding was created in 1892 from parts of Montreal West and Montreal East ridings. It consisted of St. Louis and St. Lawrence wards in the city of Montreal. It was abolished in 1914 when it was redistributed into St. Lawrence—St. George and George-Étienne Cartier ridings.

== Members of Parliament ==
This riding elected the following members of Parliament:

Parliament	Years	Member	Party
St. Lawrence; Riding created from Montreal West and Montreal East
8th	1896–1900	Edward Goff Penny	Liberal
9th	1900–1904	Robert Bickerdike	Liberal
10th	1904–1908	Robert Bickerdike	Liberal
11th	1908–1911	Robert Bickerdike	Liberal
12th	1911–1917	Robert Bickerdike	Liberal
Riding dissolved into St. Lawrence—St. George and George-Étienne Cartier

== Election results ==
1896 Canadian federal election
Party	Candidate	Votes
Liberal	Edward Goff Penny	3,632
Conservative	R. W. Smith	2,915

1900 Canadian federal election
Party	Candidate	Votes
Liberal	Robert Bickerdike	3,439
Conservative	Henry Archer Ekers	2,457

1904 Canadian federal election
Party	Candidate	Votes
Liberal	Robert Bickerdike	3,282
Conservative	C. Lane	2,632

1908 Canadian federal election
Party	Candidate	Votes
Liberal	Robert Bickerdike	3,576
Conservative	Henry A. Ekers	2,721
Independent	Albert St-Martin	186

1911 Canadian federal election
Party	Candidate	Votes
Liberal	Robert Bickerdike	4,469
Conservative	George Franklin Johnston	3,421
Socialist	William Ulric Cotton	359

== See also ==
- List of Canadian electoral districts
- Historical federal electoral districts of Canada
