= Robert Bickerdike =

Canadian politician (1843–1928)

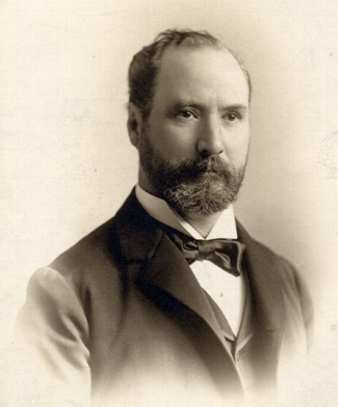

Member of the Canadian Parliament for St. Lawrence
- In office 1900–1917
- Preceded by: Edward Goff Penny
- Succeeded by: District was abolished in 1917

Member of the Legislative Assembly of Quebec for Montréal division no. 5
- In office 1897–1900
- Preceded by: John Smythe Hall
- Succeeded by: Matthew Hutchinson

Personal details
- Born: 17 August 1843 Kingston, Canada West
- Died: 28 December 1928 (aged 85) Lachine, Quebec
- Resting place: Mount Royal Cemetery

Robert Bickerdike (17 August 1843 – 28 December 1928) was a Canadian live stock shipping and insurance agent and politician.

Born in Kingston, Canada West the son of Thomas Bickerdike, of Yorkshire, England, and Agnes Cowan, Bickerdike spent most of his life in Quebec after his father moved to Beauharnois County to farm. After acquiring an elementary education at the country school of the district, Bickerdike helped his father for some time on his farm, but at the age of seventeen moved to Montreal, shortly after arriving taking his first position away from home, that of a butcher's boy.

Ten years after he arrived in Montreal he entered into the pork packing trade for himself. He sat for several years in the St. Henri town council. In 1876 he entered the export business, then practically a new industry, and for the twenty years succeeding was one of the largest cattle exporters in Canada. He organized the Dominion Abattoir and Stock Yards Company, the Dominion Live Stock Assurance Company and the Standard Light and Power Company. He had for a number of years represented the Marine Department of the Western Assurance Company. For many years Bickerdike had been a director of the Bank of Hochelaga, and for the fifteen years was its vice-president. He was for many years a member of the Council of the Montreal Board of Trade, and in 1896 was elected president. He was a life governor of the Montreal General Hospital.

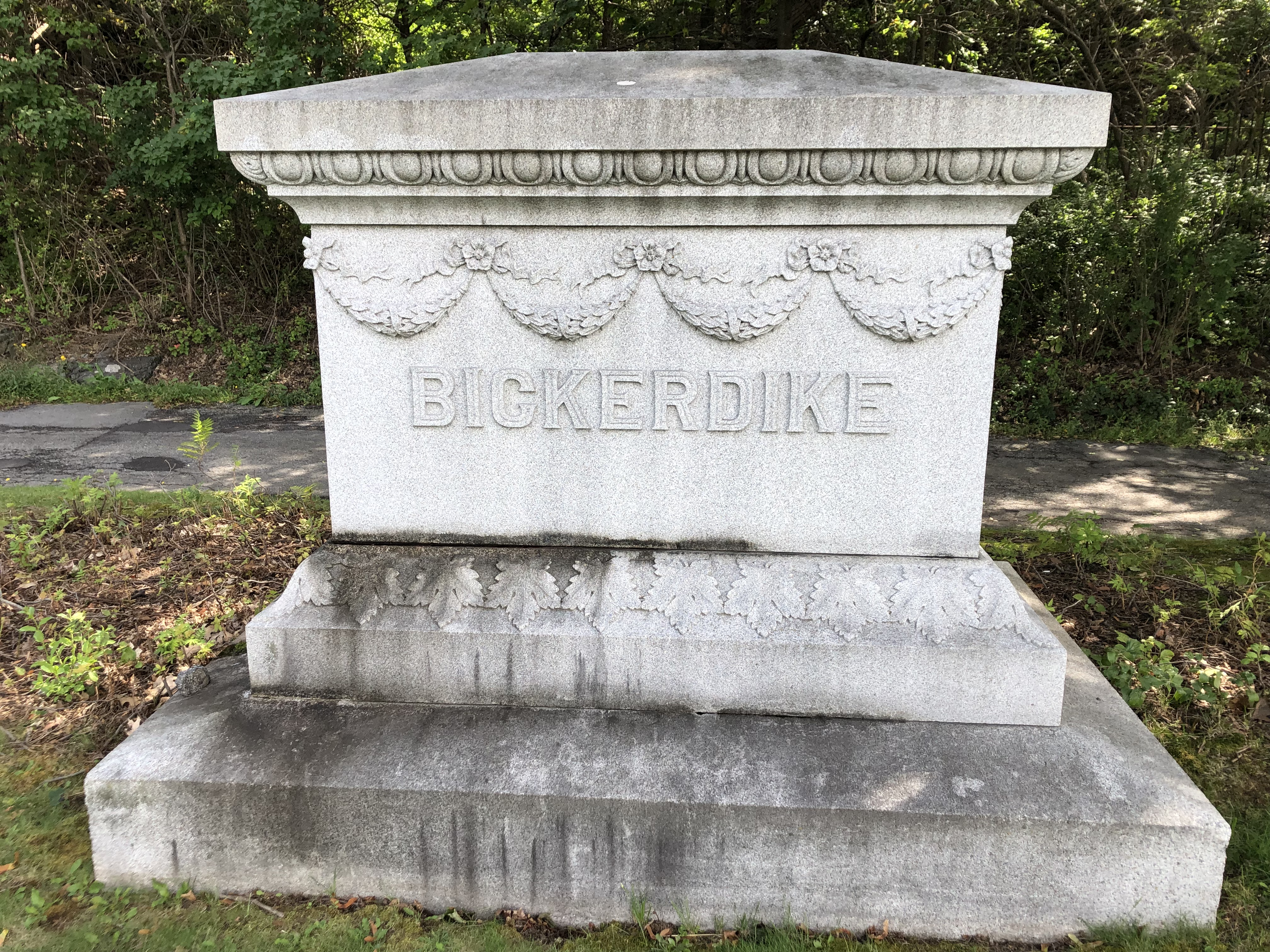
Bickerdike's funeral monument in Mount Royal Cemetery.

In 1897, he was elected as the Liberal candidate in the Montréal division no. 5 electoral district in the Legislative Assembly of Quebec. In the federal general election of 1900 he resigned his seat in the Quebec Legislature and was elected to represent St. Lawrence riding in the House of Commons of Canada. He was re-elected in 1904, 1908, and 1911.

1900 Canadian federal election: St. Lawrence
Party	Candidate	Votes
Liberal	Robert Bickerdike	3,439
Conservative	Henry Archer Ekers	2,457

1904 Canadian federal election: St. Lawrence
Party	Candidate	Votes
Liberal	Robert Bickerdike	3,282
Conservative	C. Lane	2,632

1908 Canadian federal election: St. Lawrence
Party	Candidate	Votes
Liberal	Robert Bickerdike	3,576
Conservative	Henry A. Ekers	2,721
Independent	Albert St-Martin	186

1911 Canadian federal election: St. Lawrence
Party	Candidate	Votes
Liberal	Robert Bickerdike	4,469
Conservative	George Franklin Johnston	3,421
Socialist	William Ulric Cotton	359
