= Armand Lavergne =

Canadian politician (1880–1935)

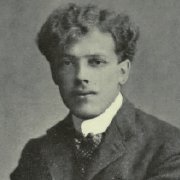

Member of the Canadian Parliament for Montmagny
- In office 1904–1908
- Preceded by: Pierre-Raymond-Léonard Martineau
- Succeeded by: Cyrias Roy
- In office 1930–1935
- Preceded by: Léo Kemner Laflamme
- Succeeded by: The electoral district was abolished in 1933.

Member of the Legislative Assembly of Quebec for Montmagny
- In office 1908–1916
- Preceded by: Joseph Alfred Ernest Roy
- Succeeded by: Joseph Elzéar Masson

Personal details
- Born: Armand Renaud Lavergne; February 21, 1880 Arthabaska, Quebec
- Died: March 5, 1935 (aged 55) Ottawa, Ontario
- Party: Liberal (until 1907); Conservative (1925–1935)
- Other political affiliations: Ligue nationaliste canadienne (1903–1916)
- Spouse: Georgette Roy
- Parent(s): Joseph Lavergne; Émilie Barthe
- Relatives: Louis Lavergne (uncle)

Armand Renaud Lavergne, KC or La Vergne (February 21, 1880 – March 5, 1935) was a Quebec lawyer, journalist and political figure. He represented Montmagny in the House of Commons of Canada as a Liberal member from 1904 to 1908 and as a Conservative member from 1930 to 1935. He represented Montmagny in the Legislative Assembly of Quebec as a Nationalist member from 1908 to 1916. His surname is given as "La Vergne" by some authoritative sources, including his National Assembly of Quebec biographical page, although these same sources spell his father's name as "Lavergne".

He was born in Arthabaska, Quebec in 1880, the son of Joseph Lavergne and Émilie Barthe, who was the daughter of Joseph-Guillaume Barthe. Lavergne studied at the Collège Sacré-Coeur at Arthabaska, the Séminaire de Québec, the University of Ottawa and Université Laval; he later studied in Paris. He articled in law, was called to the bar in 1903 and set up practice at Quebec City and then Montmagny. In 1903, he helped found the Ligue nationaliste canadienne. Lavergne directed Le Courrier at Montmagny and also contributed to Le Nationaliste, edited by Olivar Asselin, and Le Devoir, edited by Henri Bourassa.

He was elected to the House of Commons in a 1904 by-election and reelected in the general election later that year. He was expelled from the Liberal Party by Sir Wilfrid Laurier in 1907 and he resigned from his seat the following year to run for Ligue nationaliste canadienne in the 1908 Quebec election. He was elected to the legislative assembly along with Henri Bourassa and re-elected in the 1912 Quebec election; Lavergne served as the party's only member from 1912 until leaving office in the 1916 election.

In 1910, he was instrumental in achieving passage of what came to be known as the "Loi Lavergne", the first language legislation in Quebec, which required the use of French alongside English in tickets, documents, bills and contracts issued by transportation and public utility companies.

In 1904, he had married Georgette, the daughter of Philippe-Honoré Roy, a member of the Quebec assembly. He was named King's Counsel in 1918. He ran unsuccessfully as an independent candidate for a seat in the House of Commons in 1917 and 1921 before joining the federal Conservatives in 1925. He was deputy speaker and chairman of committees from 1930 to 1935. Lavergne also served as lieutenant-colonel in the militia.

Lavergne opposed the use of conscription during the First World War, was an ardent defender of French language rights outside of Quebec and lobbied for more French-Canadian participation in the federal civil service.

In 1935, he published an autobiography, Trente ans de vie nationale.

Lavergne died in office at Ottawa in 1935 and was buried in Arthabaska, Quebec (today part of Victoriaville).

== Parentage ==
Though never firmly proven, there is a substantial amount of conjecture that Armand Lavergne was the illegitimate son of Prime Minister Sir Wilfrid Laurier. It was widely speculated that his mother, Émilie, had a long-standing extramarital affair with Laurier, her husband's law practice partner. Photographs of a young Armand bear a facial resemblance to Laurier, which was remarked on at the time.

== In popular culture ==
Marcello Di Fruscia portrays Lavergne in episode 15 of season 13 "The Trial of Terrence Meyers" (February 10, 2020) of the Canadian television period detective series Murdoch Mysteries.

== Archives ==
There is an Armand Lavergne family fonds at Library and Archives Canada. Archival reference number is R6172. There is also an Armand Lavergne fonds at Bibliothèque et Archives nationales du Québec.

== Electoral record ==
By-election on 16 February 1904
Party	Candidate	Votes
Liberal	Armand Lavergne	1,251
Conservative	Maurice Rousseau	971

1904 Canadian federal election: Montmagny
Party	Candidate	Votes
Liberal	Armand Lavergne	1,222
Conservative	Henry E. Price	1,164

1917 Canadian federal election: Montmagny
Party	Candidate	Votes
Opposition (Laurier Liberals)	Aimé-Miville Déchêne	2,394
Independent	Armand Lavergne	1,343
Government (Unionist)	Joseph-George Blais	36

1925 Canadian federal election: Montmagny
Party	Candidate	Votes
Liberal	Léo Kemner Laflamme	4,070
Conservative	Armand Lavergne	3,189

1926 Canadian federal election: Montmagny
Party	Candidate	Votes
Liberal	Léo Kemner Laflamme	3,985
Conservative	Armand Lavergne	3,646

1930 Canadian federal election: Montmagny
Party	Candidate	Votes
Conservative	Armand Lavergne	3,857
Liberal	Léo Kemner Laflamme	3,653
Source: lop.parl.ca
