= Dechene =

Dechene may refer to:

- Aimé-Miville Déchêne (1881-1944), Canadian lawyer and politician
- Alphonse-Arthur Miville Déchêne (1848-1902), Canadian politician
- François-Gilbert Miville Dechêne (1859-1902), Canadian lawyer and politician
- Joseph Miville Dechene (1879-1962), Canadian politician
- Julie Miville-Dechêne (born 1959), Canadian senator
- Lucien Dechene (born 1925), Canadian hockey player
- Dechene, Edmonton, Alberta, Canada
