= Honoré Julien Jean-Baptiste Chouinard =

Canadian politician

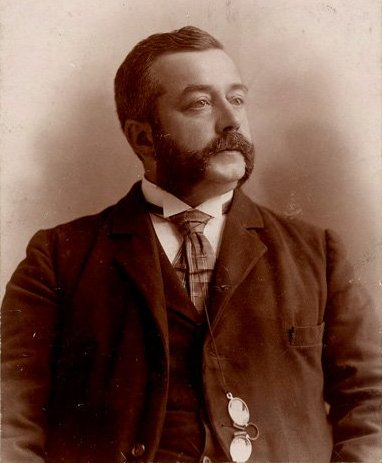

Member of the Canadian Parliament for Dorchester
- In office 1888–1891
- Preceded by: Henri-Jules Juchereau Duchesnay
- Succeeded by: Cyrille Émile Vaillancourt

Personal details
- Born: June 18, 1850 Quebec City, Canada East
- Died: November 27, 1928 (aged 78) Quebec City, Quebec

Honoré Julien Jean-Baptiste Chouinard, CMG (June 18, 1850 – November 27, 1928) was a lawyer, railroad company executive and political figure in Quebec. He represented Dorchester in the House of Commons of Canada from 1888 to 1891 as a Nationalist Conservative member.

He was born in Quebec City, the son of Honoré-Julien Chouinard and Marie Elisabeth Célina Pelletier. Chouinard was educated at the Collège Sainte-Anne, the Séminaire de Québec and the Université Laval. He was called to the Quebec bar in 1873. In 1884, he married Marie Louise Isabelle Juchereau Duchesnay, the daughter of seigneur Elzéar-Henri Juchereau Duchesnay. He served as a member of the council for Quebec City. Chouinard was one of the founders of the newspaper La Justice. He was vice-president of the Quebec and Lac Saint-Jean Railway. Chouinard was also president of Le Club Cartier de Québec, the Quebec Geographical Society, L'Institut Canadien de Québec and La Societé Saint-Jean-Baptiste de Québec. He ran unsuccessfully in the federal riding of L'Islet in 1882. Chouinard was elected to the House of Commons in an 1888 by-election held after the death of his brother-in-law Henri-Jules Juchereau Duchesnay.

He served as clerk for the city of Quebec from 1890 to 1927. Chouinard published a number of works including Histoire de la Societé Saint-Jean-Baptiste de Québec. He was one of the first to advocate a major celebration for the tricentennial of Quebec City in 1908 and the establishment of a park on the Plains of Abraham. He was appointed Companion of the Order of St Michael and St George in 1908 as the Secretary to the National Battlefields Commission, Quebec.

He died at Quebec City at the age of 78.
