= Fafard =

Fafard is a surname of French origin. Notable people with this name include:

- Adine Fafard-Drolet (1876–1963), Canadian singer and founder of a conservatory
- Fernand Fafard (1882–1955), member of the Canadian House of Commons
- Joe Fafard (1942–2019), Canadian sculptor
- Joel Fafard (born 1968), Canadian guitarist
- Patrick Fafard (born 1960), Canadian university professor
