= Jules Fournier =

Canadian writer and newspaper owner

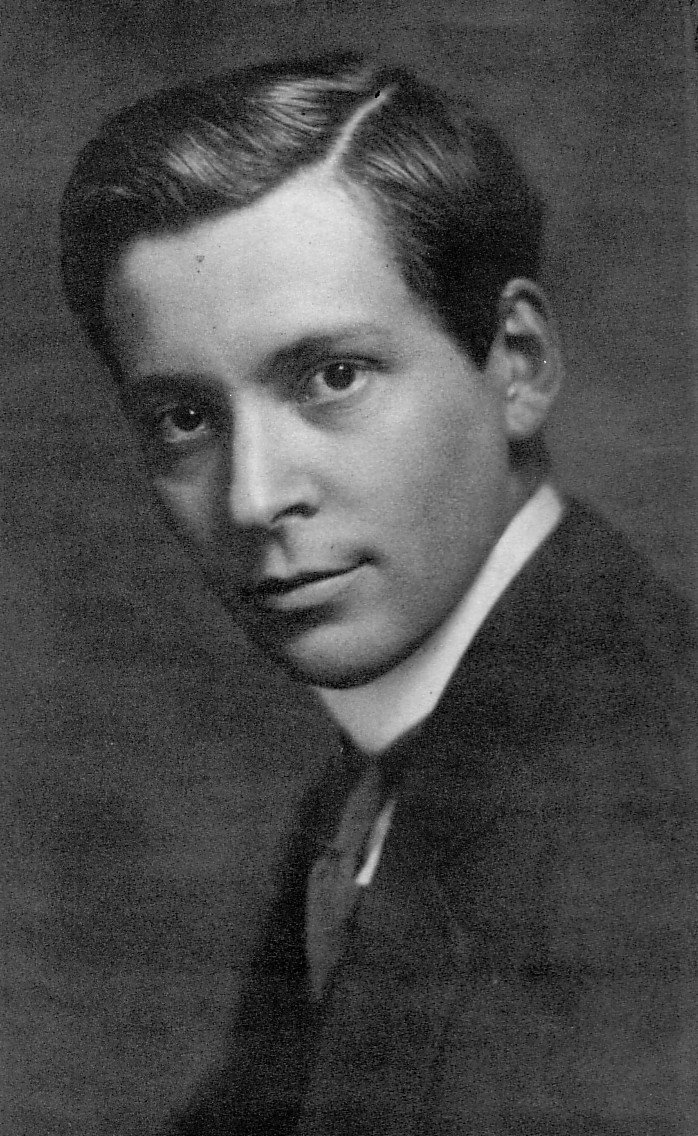
- Jules Fournier, circa 1910
- Born: August 23, 1884; Coteau-du-Lac, Quebec, Canada
- Died: April 16, 1918 (aged 33); Ottawa, Ontario, Canada
- Resting place: Notre Dame des Neiges Cemetery
- Occupations: writer, newspaper owner

Jules Fournier (August 23, 1884 - April 16, 1918) was a Canadian writer and newspaper owner.

== Biography ==
Jules Fournier was born on August 23, 1884, to parents Isaïe Fournier and Marie Durocher in Coteau-du-Lac, Quebec. His family was not wealthy, and Fournier attended a local parish school, where he was taught basic Latin. In 1897, Fournier entered the second form at Collège de Valleyfield in Salaberry-de-Valleyfield. He was an exceptional student, and was described by one of his teachers as advanced beyond his fellow students and the majority of his instructors. Following a verbal encounter with his school principal, Fournier was expelled from Collège de Valleyfield in December 1902.

In 1903, Fournier joined the La Presse newspaper in Montreal, where he met the prominent Quebec nationalist Olivar Asselin. In 1904, Fournier moved to the Le Canada newspaper. In his position there, he travelled around New England investigating the lifestyles and affairs of Franco-Americans. In 1906, Fournier was made a political reporter at Le Canada, but began writing for Asselin's Le Nationaliste publication under the name Pierre Beaudry the same year. Fournier became Le Nationaliste's editor in 1908.

Between 1907 and 1909, Fournier ran into legal trouble on several occasions as a result of his provocative journalism. In 1907, Quebec government Minister Adélard Turgeon took him to court, as did the then-future Premier of Quebec Louis-Alexandre Taschereau in 1909. Also in 1909, Fournier criticised the decisions being made by Quebec courts (calling them a "prostitution of justice"), as well as described three former politicians as "erstwhile thugs". Attorney General Lomer Gouin proceeded to charge Fournier with contempt of court. The judge in his case was none other than one of the men Fournier had disparaged, Judge François Langelier. Langelier sentenced Fournier to three months in prison, although he only served seventeen days. During this time, Fournier wrote a book, Souvenirs de prison, about his experiences in prison and the unsanitary conditions there.

In 1910, Fournier worked at Le Devoir for three months before travelling to France as a correspondent for La Patrie. Fournier formed his own weekly newspaper L’Action in April 1911, featuring contributions by his friend Asselin as well as Arthur Beauchesne, a parliamentary expert and National Historic Person of Canada, several writers and many poets. The paper was sued twice during its existence - once by the editor of Fournier's former employer, La Patrie, and once by the Mayor of Montreal for calling him a 'big thief', the latter of which Fournier won. These lawsuits during the paper's infancy led Fournier to joke that the paper should have been called L’Action pour libelle ("libel lawsuit"). After a three-month stint on the Montreal municipal council in 1916, Fournier's paper closed down on 29 April of that year.

In 1917, Fournier began work as a translator for the Senate of Canada. However, in April 1918, Fournier developed an early case of the Spanish flu and died on April 16 in Ottawa, Ontario. He was 33 years of age, and was quoted by his wife as saying that he was "too young" to die. He was entombed at the Notre Dame des Neiges Cemetery in Montreal.
