= Vaillancourt =

Vaillancourt (Valencourt) is a surname of French origin, most commonly found in the province of Quebec, Canada.

== Brief family history ==
Spelling variations of the name include: Vaillant, Vailant, Vailland, Vailand, Le Vailland, Levailland, LeVaillant, Le Vaillant, Levaillant, Vaillancourt, Vaincourt, and Valencourt.

The Vaillancourt name originates from the Northern French regions of Lorraine and Normandy. Ancestors of the family were seated at Gulis, and were important members of the aristocracy of the region.

The origin of the Vaillancourt name can be traced back to the early 13th century in Normandy, France. In 1220, an abbey was built on land belonging to Guillaume D'Abberville on his property at Thum. The abbey was given the name "de Villencourt" in reference to the court of Count William of Ponthieu, held there from 1105 to 1126 A.D. In 1195, D'Abberville married Alice of France, the daughter of Louis VII, King of France. The new marriage gave his court considerable clout; however D'Abberville died within a year of the founding of the abbey. His heirs would eventually produce two kings of England: Edward I and Edward II. The seat of the abbey was moved in 1662 to Abbeville, the capital of Ponthieu, for greater safety during the French Wars of Religion.

The name is Anglicized as Smart. Robert Vaillancourt of Normandy, France, settled in Île d'Orléans, Quebec in 1666. He is thought to be one of the first with the family name to settle in the New World. Louis-Marie Valiant, another settler of North America, was part of an early wave of French settlers that arrived in Louisiana in 1714.

== Motto ==
Je ne change point, which translates into English as: "I don't change my mind."

== Notable Vaillancourts ==
- Brian Vaillancourt American Chef and Seafood Expert. Born 1971
- Annette M. Vaillancourt, Ph.D., American Author
- Armand Vaillancourt, a Québécois sculptor, painter and performance artist
- Audrey Vaillancourt, Canadian biathlete
- Chris G. Vaillancourt, Canadian artist and poet
- Claude Vaillancourt, Canadian lawyer, judge and politician
- Cory Vaillancout, American author
- Cyrille Vaillancourt, Canadian businessman and politician
- Cyrille Émile Vaillancourt, Canadian physician and politician
- Dorothy Jean Vaillancourt, Tasmanian woman identified 59 years after remains found on California cliff
- Gilles Vaillancourt, mayor of the city of Laval, Quebec, Canada in 1989
- Henri Vaillancourt, subject of John McPhee's "The Survival of the Bark Canoe"
- Judith Vaillancourt, co-founder and designer of Vaillancourt Folk Art
- Michel Vaillancourt, Canadian show jumper
- Pamela R. Vaillancourt, American food scientist and IFT Fellow
- Paul Vaillancourt, Ontario's Strongest Man champion in 2009-11 & 2016
- Robert D. Vaillancourt, American oceanographer and educator
- Sarah Vaillancourt, Canadian Olympics women's ice hockey player
- Steve Vaillancourt (1951-2017), American politician
- Dale Vaillancourt, Co founder and owner of Divine Swine Catering, Lakeville, Minnesota
