= Léo Kemner Laflamme =

Canadian politician (1893–1989)

Member of Parliament for Montmagny
- In office October 1925 – July 1930
- Preceded by: Aimé-Miville Déchene
- Succeeded by: Armand Lavergne

Member of Parliament for Montmagny—L'Islet
- In office March 1940 – April 1945
- Preceded by: Joseph-Fernand Fafard
- Succeeded by: Jean Lesage

Personal details
- Born: Joseph-Léo Kemner Laflamme; 30 August 1893 Fitchburg, Massachusetts, United States
- Died: 10 August 1989 (aged 95)
- Party: Liberal
- Spouse(s): Béatrice Grégoire m. 22 May 1922
- Profession: lawyer

Joseph-Léo Kemner Laflamme, KC (30 August 1893 – 10 August 1989) was a Canadian politician and a Liberal member of the House of Commons of Canada. He was born in Fitchburg, Massachusetts, United States, the son of Edmund K. Laflamme and Célina Blais.

Laflamme moved to Canada in 1898 and was educated at Commercial College in Montmagny, the Quebec Seminary and at Université Laval where he attained a Bachelor of Arts. He was appointed King's Counsel in 1930 and was a Crown attorney in 1935 and 1940. Laflamme also partially owned the Levis newspaper La Laurentienne.

He was first elected to Parliament at the Montmagny riding in the 1925 general election then re-elected there in 1926. Laflamme was defeated by Armand Lavergne of the Conservative Party in the 1930 election. After riding boundaries were changed in 1933, Laflamme returned to Parliament with an election victory at the Montmagny—L'Islet riding in 1940. After serving a final term, Laflamme did not seek another federal term in the 1945 election.

== Electoral record ==
1925 Canadian federal election: Montmagny
| Party | Candidate | Votes |
|---|---|---|
| Liberal | Léo Kemner Laflamme | 4,070 |
| Conservative | Armand Lavergne | 3,189 |

1926 Canadian federal election: Montmagny
| Party | Candidate | Votes |
|---|---|---|
| Liberal | Léo Kemner Laflamme | 3,985 |
| Conservative | Armand Lavergne | 3,646 |

1930 Canadian federal election: Montmagny
| Party | Candidate | Votes |
|---|---|---|
| Conservative | Armand Lavergne | 3,857 |
| Liberal | Léo Kemner Laflamme | 3,653 |
Source: lop.parl.ca
