= Robert Perron =

Canadian politician (1915–1982)

Member of Parliament for Dorchester
- In office August 1953 – June 1957

Personal details
- Born: 18 August 1915 Sainte-Justine, Quebec, Canada
- Died: 11 October 1982 (aged 67) Sainte-Foy, Quebec
- Party: Progressive Conservative
- Spouse(s): Marie-Paule Chouinard (m. 28 October 1944)
- Profession: Lawyer

Robert Perron (18 August 1915 – 11 October 1982) was a Progressive Conservative party member of the House of Commons of Canada and a lawyer.

He was educated at Sainte-Anne-de-la-Pocatiere College, then at Université Laval where he graduated with a Bachelor of Civil Law (LL.L) degree. Perron was appointed Queen's Counsel on 19 October 1955.

He was first elected to Parliament at the Dorchester riding in the 1953 general election. He served only one term, the 22nd Canadian Parliament, then was defeated by Joseph-Armand Landry of the Liberal party in the 1957 election. Perron made another attempt to win back the Dorchester riding in 1963, but was unsuccessful in unseating Social Credit incumbent Pierre-André Boutin. Perron was also unsuccessful when he campaigned at the Quebec East riding in the 1965 election.
