= David Ovide L'Espérance =

Canadian politician (1864–1941)

The Hon. David Ovide L'Espérance

Member of the Canadian Parliament for Montmagny
- In office 1911–1917
- Preceded by: Cyrias Roy
- Succeeded by: Joseph Bruno Aimé Miville Déchêne

Senator for Gulf, Quebec
- In office 1917–1941
- Appointed by: Robert Borden
- Preceded by: Jean-Baptiste Romuald Fiset
- Succeeded by: Joseph Arthur Lesage

Personal details
- Born: January 6, 1864 Montmagny, Canada East
- Died: August 31, 1941 (aged 77)
- Party: Conservative

David Ovide L'Espérance (January 6, 1864 – August 31, 1941) was a manufacturer and political figure in Quebec. He represented Montmagny in the House of Commons of Canada from 1911 to 1916 as a Conservative. L'Espérance sat for Gulf division in the Senate of Canada from 1917 to 1941.

He was born in Montmagny, Canada East, the son of Edouard L'Espérance. In 1888, he married Clara Dionne. L'Espérance was president of the Grande Allée Apartments Company, L'Évenement Publishing Company, the Amable Bélanger Manufacturing Company, the General Car and Machinery Works in Montmagny and the Quebec Exposition Board. L'Espérance was also chairman of the Harbour Commission of Quebec. He was an unsuccessful candidate for a seat in the House of Commons in 1908. L'Espérance resigned his seat in the House of Commons in 1916 upon his appointment to the Senate. He died in office at the age of 77.

== Electoral record ==
1908 Canadian federal election: Montmagny
Party	Candidate	Votes
Liberal	Cyrias Roy	1,388
Conservative	David Ovide L'Espérance	1,230

1911 Canadian federal election: Montmagny
Party	Candidate	Votes
Conservative	David Ovide L'Espérance	1,653
Liberal	Henri Sévérin Béland	1,328
