= L'Islet =

L'Islet may refer to:

- L'Islet, Quebec, a municipality
- L'Islet Regional County Municipality, an administrative unit in Quebec
- L'Islet (federal electoral district), a former federal electoral district in Quebec
- L'Islet (provincial electoral district), a former provincial electoral district in Quebec
- L'Islet, site of Elizabeth Castle, Jersey
