= Léonard Tremblay =

Canadian politician (1896–1968)

The Hon. Léonard Tremblay

Member of the Canadian Parliament for Dorchester
- In office October 14, 1935 – June 11, 1953
- Preceded by: Onésime Gagnon
- Succeeded by: Robert Perron

Senator for Lauzon, Quebec
- In office June 12, 1953 – September 2, 1965
- Appointed by: Louis St. Laurent
- Preceded by: Eugène Paquet
- Succeeded by: Jean-Paul Deschatelets

Personal details
- Born: Léonard-David Sweezey Tremblay; 16 April 1896 Chicoutimi, Quebec, Canada
- Died: 19 September 1968 (aged 72)
- Party: Liberal
- Spouse(s): Beatrice Cote m. 17 May 1920
- Profession: journalist, public servant

Léonard-David Sweezey Tremblay (16 April 1896 – 19 September 1968) was a Liberal party member of the House of Commons of Canada. He was born in Chicoutimi, Quebec and became a journalist and public servant by career.

Tremblay was educated at Lauzon College and served in both World War I and World War II. He was first elected to Parliament at the Dorchester riding in the 1935 general election then re-elected there in 1940, 1945 and 1949. The margin of victory of the 1949 election was particularly small, as Progressive Conservative candidate Gérard Corriveau trailed by 221 votes.

At the end of the 21st Canadian Parliament in June 1953, Tremblay was appointed to the Senate under the Lauzon division and remained in the Senate until September 1965.
