= Ernest Roy =

Ernest Roy may refer to:

- Joseph Alfred Ernest Roy (1871–1928), Quebec lawyer, journalist, judge and political figure
- Ernest G. Roy (born 1896), British film producer
