= Jean-Thomas Taschereau =

Jean-Thomas Taschereau may refer to:

- Jean-Thomas Taschereau (1778–1832), Canadian politician and judge
- Jean-Thomas Taschereau (judge) (1814–1893), Canadian jurist, his son
