= Montmagny (federal electoral district) =

Former federal electoral district in Quebec, Canada

Quebec electoral district

Defunct federal electoral district
- Legislature: House of Commons
- District created: 1867
- District abolished: 1933
- First contested: 1867
- Last contested: 1930

Montmagny (French pronunciation: [mɔ̃maɲi]) was a federal electoral district in Quebec, Canada, that was represented in the House of Commons of Canada from 1867 to 1935.

This riding was created by the British North America Act, 1867. It consisted initially of the County of Montmagny. In 1882, the northeastern part of the Township of Armagh in the County of Bellechasse, and the northeastern part of the township of Mailloux, were transferred from Bellechasse to Montmagny. In 1924, it was redefined to consist of the County of Montmagny and the Ile-aux-Grues and adjoining islands.

It was abolished in 1933 when it was redistributed into the Bellechasse and Montmagny—L'Islet electoral districts.

== Members of Parliament ==
This riding elected the following members of Parliament:

Parliament	Years	Member	Party
Montmagny
1st	1867–1872	Joseph-Octave Beaubien	Conservative
2nd	1872–1874	Henri-Thomas Taschereau	Liberal
3rd	1874–1878	Henri-Thomas Taschereau	Liberal
4th	1878–1882	Auguste Charles Philippe Robert Landry	Conservative
5th	1882–1887	Auguste Charles Philippe Robert Landry	Conservative
6th	1887–1891	Philippe-Auguste Choquette	Liberal
7th	1891–1896	Philippe-Auguste Choquette	Liberal
8th	1896–1898	Philippe-Auguste Choquette	Liberal
8th	1898–1900	Pierre-Raymond-Léonard Martineau	Liberal
9th	1900–1903	Pierre-Raymond-Léonard Martineau	Liberal
9th	1904–1904	Armand Lavergne	Liberal
10th	1904–1908	Armand Lavergne	Liberal
11th	1908–1911	Cyrias Roy	Liberal
12th	1911–1917	David Ovide L'Espérance	Conservative
13th	1917–1921	Aimé-Miville Déchêne	Opposition (Laurier Liberals)
14th	1921–1925	Aimé-Miville Déchêne	Liberal
15th	1925–1926	Léo Kemner Laflamme	Liberal
16th	1926–1930	Léo Kemner Laflamme	Liberal
17th	1930–1935	Armand Lavergne	Conservative
Riding dissolved into Bellechasse and Montmagny—L'Islet

== Election results ==
1867 Canadian federal election
Party	Candidate	Votes
Conservative	Joseph-Octave Beaubien	acclaimed
Source: Canadian Elections Database

1872 Canadian federal election
Party	Candidate	Votes
Liberal	Henri-Thomas Taschereau	675
Conservative	Joseph-Octave Beaubien	594
Source: Canadian Elections Database

1874 Canadian federal election
Party	Candidate	Votes
Liberal	Henri-Thomas Taschereau	acclaimed
Source: lop.parl.ca

1878 Canadian federal election
Party	Candidate	Votes
Conservative	Auguste Charles Philippe Robert Landry	784
Liberal	Onésiphore Carbonneau	746

1882 Canadian federal election
Party	Candidate	Votes
Conservative	Auguste Charles Philippe Robert Landry	815
Liberal	Philippe-Auguste Choquette	695

1887 Canadian federal election
Party	Candidate	Votes
Liberal	Philippe-Auguste Choquette	1,071
Conservative	Auguste Charles Philippe Robert Landry	878

1891 Canadian federal election
Party	Candidate	Votes
Liberal	Philippe-Auguste Choquette	1,172
Conservative	E. P. Bender	739

1896 Canadian federal election
Party	Candidate	Votes
Liberal	Philippe-Auguste Choquette	1,143
Conservative	E. P. Bender	901

By-election on 14 December 1898
Party	Candidate	Votes
Liberal	Pierre-Raymond-Léonard Martineau	1,019
Conservative	A. Blouin	489

1900 Canadian federal election
Party	Candidate	Votes
Liberal	Pierre-Raymond-Léonard Martineau	1,186
Conservative	Alphonse Bernier	973

By-election on 16 February 1904
Party	Candidate	Votes
Liberal	Armand Lavergne	1,251
Conservative	Maurice Rousseau	971

1904 Canadian federal election
Party	Candidate	Votes
Liberal	Armand Lavergne	1,222
Conservative	Henry E. Price	1,164

1908 Canadian federal election
Party	Candidate	Votes
Liberal	Cyrias Roy	1,388
Conservative	David Ovide L'Espérance	1,230

1911 Canadian federal election
Party	Candidate	Votes
Conservative	David Ovide L'Espérance	1,653
Liberal	Henri Sévérin Béland	1,328

1917 Canadian federal election
Party	Candidate	Votes
Opposition (Laurier Liberals)	Aimé-Miville Déchêne	2,394
Independent	Armand Lavergne	1,343
Government (Unionist)	Joseph-George Blais	36

1921 Canadian federal election
Party	Candidate	Votes
Liberal	Aimé-Miville Déchêne	5,103
Independent	Télesphore Coulombe	1,332

1925 Canadian federal election
Party	Candidate	Votes
Liberal	Léo Kemner Laflamme	4,070
Conservative	Armand Lavergne	3,189

1926 Canadian federal election
Party	Candidate	Votes
Liberal	Léo Kemner Laflamme	3,985
Conservative	Armand Lavergne	3,646

1930 Canadian federal election
Party	Candidate	Votes
Conservative	Armand Lavergne	3,857
Liberal	Léo Kemner Laflamme	3,653
Source: lop.parl.ca

== See also ==
- List of Canadian electoral districts
- Historical federal electoral districts of Canada
