= Jean-Baptiste Morin (politician) =

Canadian politician (1840–1911)

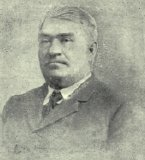

Member of the Canadian Parliament for Dorchester
- In office 1896–1908
- Preceded by: Cyrille-Émile Vaillancourt
- Succeeded by: Joseph Alfred Ernest Roy

Personal details
- Born: September 22, 1840 Sainte-Hénédine, Lower Canada
- Died: February 20, 1911 (aged 70)
- Party: Conservative

Jean-Baptiste Morin (September 22, 1840 – February 20, 1911) was a Canadian politician.

Born in Sainte-Hénédine, Dorchester County, Lower Canada, Morin moved to the United States in 1856 and lived there for thirty-two years. Returning to Quebec, he was Warden of the County of Dorchester and President of the School Commissioners in Sainte-Hénédine. He was a J.P. and was elected Mayor of Sainte-Hénédine in 1889. He was first elected to the House of Commons of Canada for the electoral district of Dorchester in the general elections of 1896. A Conservative, he was re-elected in 1900 and 1904.
