= Lavergne Law =

Early language law in Quebec, Canada

The La Vergne Law (or Lavergne Law) of 1910, formally known as the Loi amendant le Code civil concernant les contrats faits avec les compagnies de services d'utilité publique (1910, Geo. V, c. 40), was an act of the Parliament of Quebec which made the use of both English and French mandatory on tickets, documents, bills and contracts issued by transportation and public utility companies. Prior to this, these were customarily in English only.

The law's primary sponsor was Armand La Vergne (or Lavergne), a legislator representing the Ligue nationaliste canadienne. The law came into effect on January 1, 1911.

Although the scope of the legislation was very limited, it is remembered today as the first example of French-language rights legislation in Quebec.

== Text ==
The English version of the law reads as follows:

Article 1

The following articles are added after article 1682b of the Civil Code as enacted by the act 5 Edward VII, chapter 28, section 1:

"1682c. The following shall be printed in French and in English : passenger tickets, baggage-checks, way-bills, bills of lading, printed telegraph forms, and contract forms, made, furnished or delivered by a railway, navigation, telegraph, telephone transportation, express or electric power company, as well as all notices or regulations posted up in its stations, carriages, boats, offices, factories or workshops."

"1682d. Every contravention, by a railway, navigation, telegraph, telephone, transportation, express or electric power company, doing business in this Province, of any of the provisions of the foregoing article shall be punished by a fine not exceeding twenty dollars, without, prejudice to recourse for damages."

Article 2

This act shall come into force on the first day of January, 1911.

== See also ==
- Language policy
