= Dorchester (federal electoral district) =

Former federal electoral district in Quebec, Canada

Coordinates: 46.75°N 70.66°W

Quebec electoral district

Defunct federal electoral district
- Legislature: House of Commons
- District created: 1867
- District abolished: 1966
- First contested: 1867
- Last contested: 1965
- Communities: Saint-Prosper-de-Dorchester

Dorchester was a federal electoral district in Quebec, Canada, that was represented in the House of Commons of Canada from 1867 to 1968.

It was created by the British North America Act, 1867, which preserved the existing electoral districts in Lower Canada at the time. In 1966, it was redistributed into the Beauce, Bellechasse and Lévis electoral districts.

== Members of Parliament ==
This riding elected the following members of Parliament:

| Parliament | Years | Member | Party |
|---|---|---|---|
Dorchester
| 1st | 1867–1872 | Hector-Louis Langevin | Conservative |
| 2nd | 1872–1874 | Hector-Louis Langevin | Conservative |
| 3rd | 1874–1875 | François Fortunat Rouleau | Liberal–Conservative |
| 3rd | 1875–1878 | François Fortunat Rouleau | Liberal–Conservative |
| 4th | 1878–1882 | François Fortunat Rouleau | Liberal–Conservative |
| 5th | 1882–1887 | Charles Alexander Lesage | Conservative |
| 6th | 1887–1887 | Henri-Jules Juchereau Duchesnay | Nationalist Conservative |
| 6th | 1888–1891 | Honoré Julien Jean-Baptiste Chouinard | Conservative |
| 7th | 1891–1896 | Cyrille Émile Vaillancourt | Nationalist |
| 8th | 1896–1900 | Jean-Baptiste Morin | Conservative |
| 9th | 1900–1904 | Jean-Baptiste Morin | Conservative |
| 10th | 1904–1908 | Jean-Baptiste Morin | Conservative |
| 11th | 1908–1911 | Joseph Alfred Ernest Roy | Liberal |
| 12th | 1911–1917 | Albert Sévigny | Conservative |
| 12th | 1917–1917 | Albert Sévigny | Conservative |
| 13th | 1917–1921 | Lucien Cannon | Opposition (Laurier Liberals) |
| 14th | 1921–1925 | Lucien Cannon | Liberal |
| 15th | 1925–1926 | Lucien Cannon | Liberal |
| 16th | 1926–1926 | Lucien Cannon | Liberal |
| 16th | 1926–1930 | Lucien Cannon | Liberal |
| 17th | 1930–1935 | Onésime Gagnon | Conservative |
| 18th | 1935–1940 | Léonard Tremblay | Liberal |
| 19th | 1940–1945 | Léonard Tremblay | Liberal |
| 20th | 1945–1949 | Léonard Tremblay | Liberal |
| 21st | 1949–1953 | Léonard Tremblay | Liberal |
| 22nd | 1953–1957 | Robert Perron | Progressive Conservative |
| 23rd | 1957–1958 | Joseph-Armand Landry | Liberal |
| 24th | 1958–1962 | Noël Drouin | Progressive Conservative |
| 25th | 1962–1963 | Pierre-André Boutin | Social Credit |
| 26th | 1963–1963 | Pierre-André Boutin | Social Credit |
| 26th | 1963–1965 | Pierre-André Boutin | Ralliement créditiste |
| 27th | 1965–1968 | Gustave Côté | Liberal |
Riding dissolved into Beauce, Bellechasse and Lévis

== Election results ==
1867 Canadian federal election
| Party | Candidate | Votes |
|---|---|---|
| Conservative | Hector Langevin | acclaimed |
Source: Canadian Elections Database

1872 Canadian federal election
| Party | Candidate | Votes |
|---|---|---|
| Conservative | Hector-Louis Langevin | 1,044 |
| Unknown | E.H. Marceau | 724 |
Source: Canadian Elections Database

1874 Canadian federal election
| Party | Candidate | Votes |
|---|---|---|
| Liberal–Conservative | François Fortunat Rouleau | 895 |
| Unknown | E.H. Marceau | 874 |
Source: Canadian Elections Database

By-election on 14 December 1875 Rouleau unseated on petition, 8 July 1875
| Party | Candidate | Votes |
| Liberal–Conservative | François Fortunat Rouleau | 1,086 |
| Unknown | Alfred Morrisset | 620 |

1878 Canadian federal election
| Party | Candidate | Votes |
|---|---|---|
| Liberal–Conservative | François Fortunat Rouleau | 1,081 |
| Unknown | H. Marceau | 362 |

1882 Canadian federal election
| Party | Candidate | Votes |
|---|---|---|
| Conservative | Charles Alexander Lesage | acclaimed |

1887 Canadian federal election
| Party | Candidate | Votes |
|---|---|---|
| Nationalist Conservative | Henri Jules Juchereau Duchesnay | 1,565 |
| Conservative | Charles Alexander Lesage | 1,089 |

By-election on 7 January 1888 Duchesnay's death, 6 July 1887
| Party | Candidate | Votes |
| Conservative | Honoré Julien Jean-Baptiste Chouinard | acclaimed |

1891 Canadian federal election
| Party | Candidate | Votes |
|---|---|---|
| Nationaliste | Cyrille Émile Vaillancourt | acclaimed |

1896 Canadian federal election
| Party | Candidate | Votes |
|---|---|---|
| Conservative | Jean-Baptiste Morin | 1,480 |
| Nationaliste | C.E. Vaillancourt | 1,150 |

1900 Canadian federal election
| Party | Candidate | Votes |
|---|---|---|
| Conservative | Jean-Baptiste Morin | 1,691 |
| Liberal | J.S. Ouellet | 1,322 |
| Independent | F.X. Guay | 90 |
| Unknown | F.F. Rouleau | 27 |

1904 Canadian federal election
| Party | Candidate | Votes |
|---|---|---|
| Conservative | Jean-Baptiste Morin | 1,773 |
| Parti nationaliste | C.E. Vaillancourt | 1,429 |

1908 Canadian federal election
| Party | Candidate | Votes |
|---|---|---|
| Liberal | Ernest Roy | 2,084 |
| Conservative | Edmund James Flynn | 1,921 |

1911 Canadian federal election
| Party | Candidate | Votes |
|---|---|---|
| Conservative | Albert Sévigny | 2,506 |
| Liberal | Ernest Roy | 2,164 |

By-election on 27 January 1917 Sévigny appointed Minister of Inland Revenue, 8 January 1917
| Party | Candidate | Votes |
| Conservative | Albert Sévigny | 2,719 |
| Liberal | Lucien Cannon | 2,445 |

1917 Canadian federal election
| Party | Candidate | Votes |
|---|---|---|
| Opposition (Laurier Liberals) | Lucien Cannon | 4,228 |
| Government (Unionist) | Albert Sévigny | 497 |

1921 Canadian federal election
| Party | Candidate | Votes |
|---|---|---|
| Liberal | Lucien Cannon | 5,744 |
| Conservative | Philomon Vallière | 2,703 |

1925 Canadian federal election
| Party | Candidate | Votes |
|---|---|---|
| Liberal | Lucien Cannon | 5,167 |
| Conservative | Louis Joseph Gauthier | 3,666 |

1926 Canadian federal election
| Party | Candidate | Votes |
|---|---|---|
| Liberal | Lucien Cannon | 5,627 |
| Conservative | Robert Coté | 3,640 |

By-election on 2 November 1926 Cannon's acceptance of an office of emolument under the Crown, 5 October 1926
| Party | Candidate | Votes |
| Liberal | Lucien Cannon | acclaimed |

1930 Canadian federal election
| Party | Candidate | Votes |
|---|---|---|
| Conservative | Onésime Gagnon | 5,771 |
| Liberal | Lucien Cannon | 5,433 |
Source: lop.parl.ca

1935 Canadian federal election
| Party | Candidate | Votes |
|---|---|---|
| Liberal | Léonard-David Tremblay | 5,186 |
| Conservative | Onésime Gagnon | 5,098 |
| Unknown | J.-Adalbert Guay | 154 |

1940 Canadian federal election
| Party | Candidate | Votes |
|---|---|---|
| Liberal | Léonard-David Tremblay | 5,573 |
| Independent | Emmett O'Farrel | 4,721 |

1945 Canadian federal election
| Party | Candidate | Votes |
|---|---|---|
| Liberal | Léonard-David Tremblay | 5,149 |
| Independent | Emile Boiteau | 4,291 |
| Social Credit | Joseph-Ernest Grégoire | 1,843 |

1949 Canadian federal election
| Party | Candidate | Votes |
|---|---|---|
| Liberal | Léonard-David Tremblay | 6,983 |
| Progressive Conservative | Gérard Corriveau | 6,762 |
| Union des électeurs | Louis-Philippe Bouchard | 1,020 |

1953 Canadian federal election
| Party | Candidate | Votes |
|---|---|---|
| Progressive Conservative | Robert Perron | 7,762 |
| Liberal | Joseph-Armand Landry | 7,656 |

1957 Canadian federal election
| Party | Candidate | Votes |
|---|---|---|
| Liberal | Joseph-Armand Landry | 8,054 |
| Progressive Conservative | Robert Perron | 7,702 |

1958 Canadian federal election
| Party | Candidate | Votes |
|---|---|---|
| Progressive Conservative | Noël Drouin | 8,766 |
| Liberal | Joseph-Armand Landry | 7,111 |

1962 Canadian federal election
| Party | Candidate | Votes |
|---|---|---|
| Social Credit | Pierre-André Boutin | 7,701 |
| Liberal | Francis O'Farrell | 3,939 |
| Progressive Conservative | Noël Drouin | 3,582 |

1963 Canadian federal election
| Party | Candidate | Votes |
|---|---|---|
| Social Credit | Pierre-André Boutin | 5,830 |
| Liberal | Francis O'Farrell | 4,801 |
| Progressive Conservative | Robert Perron | 3,597 |

1965 Canadian federal election: Dorchester
| Party | Candidate | Votes |
|---|---|---|
| Liberal | Gustave Côté | 4,602 |
| Progressive Conservative | Albert Rioux | 3,802 |
| Ralliement créditiste | Pierre-André Boutin | 3,786 |
| New Democratic | Henri Lessard | 494 |

== See also ==
- List of Canadian electoral districts
- Historical federal electoral districts of Canada
