= Philippe-Auguste Choquette =

Canadian politician (1854–1948)

The Honourable Philippe-Auguste Choquette
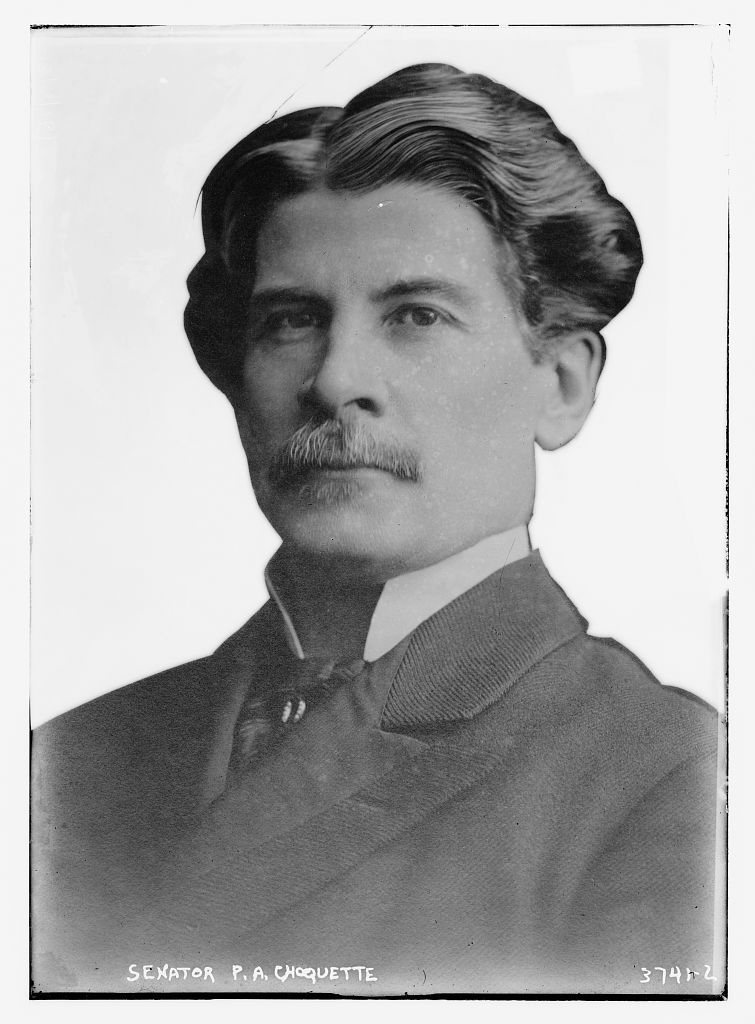

Member of the Canadian Parliament for Montmagny
- In office 1887–1898
- Preceded by: Auguste Charles Philippe Robert Landry
- Succeeded by: Pierre-Raymond-Léonard Martineau

Canadian Senator from Grandville
- In office 1904–1919
- Appointed by: Wilfrid Laurier
- Preceded by: Charles Alphonse Pantaléon Pelletier
- Succeeded by: Thomas Chapais

Personal details
- Born: 6 January 1854 Belœil, Canada East
- Died: 20 December 1948 (aged 94)
- Party: Liberal
- Children: Fernand Choquette

Philippe-Auguste Choquette (French pronunciation: [filip oɡyst ʃɔkɛt]; 6 January 1854 – 20 December 1948) was a Canadian Member of Parliament and Senator.

== Biography ==
He was born on 6 January 1854, in Beloeil, Canada East to Joseph Choquette and Thaïs Audet. He studied at Université Laval and was admitted to the Quebec Bar in 1880 and to the King's Council in 1890.

After running unsuccessfully in the 1882 election, he was elected as a Liberal in the riding of Montmagny in the 1887 election. He was re-elected in 1891 and 1896. From 1898 until 1904, he was a Judge in the Quebec Superior Court, Arthabaska District. In 1904, he was appointed to the Senate representing the Senatorial division of Grandville, Quebec. He resigned in 1919. He also served as President of Quebec Bulldogs hockey club for several years, winning the Stanley Cup in 1912, and 1913.

He died on 20 December 1948.

== Legacy ==
He is the father of Fernand Choquette, a Quebec MNA and judge of the Quebec Court of Appeal and Auguste Choquette.

== Electoral record ==
1882 Canadian federal election: Montmagny
Party	Candidate	Votes
Conservative	Auguste Charles Philippe Robert Landry	815
Liberal	Philippe-Auguste Choquette	695

1887 Canadian federal election: Montmagny
Party	Candidate	Votes
Liberal	Philippe-Auguste Choquette	1,071
Conservative	Auguste Charles Philippe Robert Landry	878

1891 Canadian federal election: Montmagny
Party	Candidate	Votes
Liberal	Philippe-Auguste Choquette	1,172
Conservative	E. P. Bender	739

1896 Canadian federal election: Montmagny
Party	Candidate	Votes
Liberal	Philippe-Auguste Choquette	1,143
Conservative	E. P. Bender	901
