= Onésiphore Carbonneau =

Canadian politician (1852–1932)

Member of the Canadian Parliament for L'Islet
- In office 1902–1904
- Preceded by: Alphonse-Arthur Miville Déchêne
- Succeeded by: Eugène Paquet

Personal details
- Born: June 17, 1852 Berthier-en-Bas, Canada East
- Died: February 25, 1932 (aged 79)
- Party: Liberal

Onésiphore Carbonneau (June 17, 1852 – February 25, 1932) was a Canadian merchant and political figure in Quebec. He represented L'Islet in the House of Commons of Canada from 1902 to 1904 as a Liberal.

He was born in Berthier-en-Bas, Canada East, the son of J.O. Carbonneau and Soulange Dion, and was educated there. In 1874, he married Adele Turgeon. Carbonneau ran unsuccessfully for the Montmagny seat in the House of Commons in 1878. He was first elected to the House of Commons in a 1902 by-election held after Alphonse Arthur Miville Déchêne was named to the Canadian senate. He was defeated when he ran for reelection in 1904.

== Electoral record ==
1878 Canadian federal election: Montmagny
Party	Candidate	Votes
Conservative	Auguste Charles Philippe Robert Landry	784
Liberal	Onésiphore Carbonneau	746

By-election on 15 January 1902
Party	Candidate	Votes
Liberal	Onésiphore Carbonneau	953
Conservative	Jos. Ed. Caron	932

1904 Canadian federal election: L'Islet
Party	Candidate	Votes
Conservative	Eugène Paquet	1,195
Liberal	Onésiphore Carbonneau	1,038
