= Henri-Thomas Taschereau =

Canadian politician

Sir Henri-Thomas Taschereau
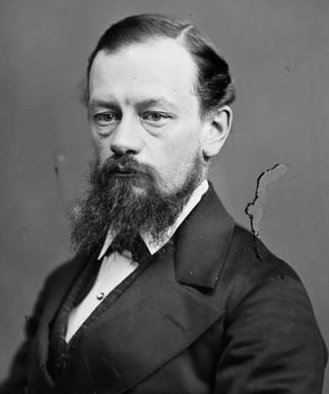

Member of the Canadian Parliament for Montmagny
- In office 1872–1878
- Preceded by: Joseph-Octave Beaubien
- Succeeded by: Auguste Charles Philippe Robert Landry

Personal details
- Born: October 6, 1841 Quebec City, Canada East
- Died: October 11, 1909 (aged 68) Montmorency, France
- Party: Liberal

Sir Henri-Thomas Taschereau (October 6, 1841 – October 11, 1909) was a lawyer, politician and judge in Quebec, Canada.

The son of Jean-Thomas Taschereau, Taschereau received his basic education at the Petit Séminaire de Québec from 1851 to 1859. He then entered Université Laval where he received a law degree in 1862 and was called to the bar of Lower Canada in 1863.

After passing the Bar of Quebec, he practised law in Quebec and soon built a large practice. He also pursued an interest in politics and began publishing a short-lived newspaper. Various forays into public life followed and in 1872 was elected to the House of Commons of Canada.

By age 37 his reputation earned him an appointment to the Quebec Superior Court and he served there until 1901 sitting as judge in many important trials. From 1901 to 1907, he headed up two royal commissions for the federal government of Canada.

In 1907, his legal stature was recognized with his appointment as chief justice of Quebec. In 1908, Edward VII knighted him. His death in 1909 left a legacy of writings on the law as part of the records in the courts and commissions where he served.

1872 Canadian federal election: Montmagny
Party	Candidate	Votes
Liberal	Henri-Thomas Taschereau	675
Conservative	Joseph-Octave Beaubien	594
Source: Canadian Elections Database

1874 Canadian federal election: Montmagny
Party	Candidate	Votes
Liberal	Henri-Thomas Taschereau	acclaimed
Source: lop.parl.ca
