= Onésime Gagnon =

Canadian politician (1888–1961)

The Honourable Onésime Gagnon PC
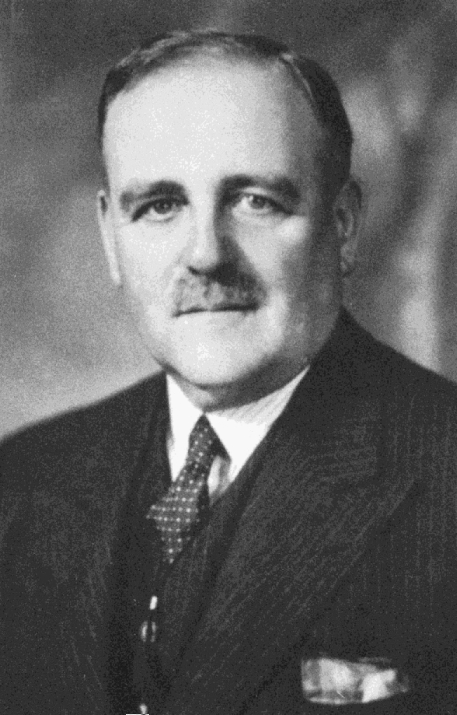

20th Lieutenant Governor of Quebec
- In office February 14, 1958 – September 30, 1961
- Monarch: Elizabeth II
- Governors General: Vincent Massey; Georges Vanier
- Premier: Maurice Duplessis; Paul Sauvé; Antonio Barrette; Jean Lesage
- Preceded by: Gaspard Fauteux
- Succeeded by: Paul Comtois

Member of the Legislative Assembly of Quebec for Matane
- In office August 17, 1936 – February 14, 1958
- Preceded by: Joseph-Arthur Bergeron
- Succeeded by: Benoît Gaboury

Member of the Canadian Parliament for Dorchester
- In office July 28, 1930 – October 14, 1935
- Preceded by: Lucien Cannon
- Succeeded by: Léonard Tremblay

Personal details
- Born: October 23, 1888 Saint-Léon-de-Standon, Quebec
- Died: September 30, 1961 (aged 72) Bois-de-Coulonge, Sillery, Quebec
- Party: Federal: Conservative; Provincial: Union nationale
- Cabinet: Federal: Minister Without Portfolio (1935); Provincial: Minister of Mines, Game and Fisheries (1936); Minister of Mines and Fisheries (1936–1939); Provincial Treasurer (1944–1958)

Onésime Gagnon PC (French pronunciation: [ɔnezim ɡaɲɔ̃]; October 23, 1888 – September 30, 1961) was a Canadian politician who served as the 20th Lieutenant Governor of Québec.

== Background ==
He was born in Saint-Léon-de-Standon, Quebec, on October 23, 1888, and was the son of Onésime Gagnon and Julie Morin. He was a Rhodes scholar and was called to the Quebec Bar in 1912. From 1942 to 1958, he was a Professor in the Faculty of Law at Université Laval.

== Member of Parliament ==
In 1930, he was elected to the House of Commons of Canada for the riding of Dorchester. A Conservative, he was re-elected in 1935. In 1935, he was a Minister without Portfolio in the cabinet of R. B. Bennett.

== Provincial politics ==
Gagnon was a leadership candidate at the Conservative Party of Quebec convention, held in Sherbrooke on October 4 and 5, 1933. He was defeated by Maurice Duplessis with 28% of the delegates.

In 1936, he was elected to the Legislative Assembly of Quebec and became the Union Nationale Member for the riding of Matane. He was appointed Minister in the Cabinet of Maurice Duplessis, serving as Minister of Fisheries from 1936 to 1939 and as Treasurer from 1944 to 1958.

He was re-elected in 1939, 1944, 1948, 1952, and 1956.

== Lieutenant governor ==
He resigned in 1958 to accept the office of Lieutenant-Governor of Quebec and served until his death.

== Death ==
Gagnon died on September 30, 1961.
