= Auguste Charles Philippe Robert Landry =

Canadian politician (1846–1919)

The Honourable Philippe Landry
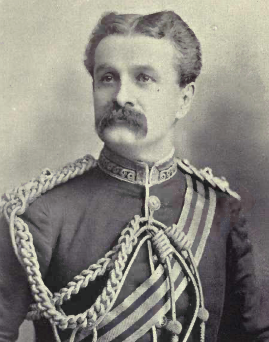

Senator for Stadacona, Quebec
- In office 23 February 1892 – 20 December 1919
- Appointed by: John Joseph Caldwell Abbott
- Preceded by: Pierre Baillargeon
- Succeeded by: Lorne Campbell Webster

Member of the Canadian Parliament for Montmagny
- In office 17 September 1878 – 22 February 1887
- Preceded by: Henri-Thomas Taschereau
- Succeeded by: Philippe-Auguste Choquette

Member of the Legislative Assembly of Quebec for Montmagny
- In office 1875–1876
- Preceded by: François Langelier
- Succeeded by: Louis-Napoléon Fortin

Personal details
- Born: 15 January 1846 Quebec City, Canada East
- Died: 12 December 1919 (aged 73) Quebec City, Quebec, Canada
- Party: Conservative
- Portfolio: Speaker of the Senate (23 October 1911 – 2 June 1916)

Auguste Charles Philippe Robert Landry (15 January 1846 – 20 December 1919) was a Canadian parliamentarian who served as Speaker of the Senate of Canada from 1911 to 1916.

== Biography ==
Landry was born Charles-Philippe-Auguste-Robert Landry in Quebec City, the son of Jean-Étienne Landry and Caroline-Eulalie Lelièvre, and educated at the Séminaire de Québec and at the Ste-Anne's Agricultural College, where he won awards for his work in agricultural science.

He wrote a number of pamphlets and articles on the scientific theory and practice of agriculture, was himself a successful farmer, and served for a period as president of the Agricultural Society of Quebec.

Landry was married twice: first to Marie-Anne-Antoinette-Wilhelmine Couture in 1868, and later to Amélie Dionne, the widow of Édouard Taschereau and daughter of Élisée Dionne, who was a member of the Quebec Legislative Council, in 1908.A son was Brigadier-General Joseph Philippe Landry, CMG, VD.

Landry also pursued a military career and rose to the position of Lieutenant Colonel of the 61st Regiment of Montmagny on 9 January 1885. He commanded the 10th Infantry Brigade during the Fenian Raids and was awarded a medal for his conduct. He served as aide de camp to Lord Stanley of Preston and Lord Aberdeen, was colonel of the 61st Regiment in 1903 and was the regiment's Honorary Colonel in 1909.

He won a seat in the Quebec Legislative Assembly in 1875, but the election was overturned a year later. He served as president of the Conservative Party Association of Quebec for several years and was first elected to the House of Commons of Canada in 1878 as a Conservative representing Montmagny, Quebec. He was re-elected in the 1882 election but was defeated in 1887.

In Parliament, Landry introduced several bills to abolish the Supreme Court of Canada and the Exchequer Court, taking up the cause of Joseph Keeler after his death.

In 1892, he was summoned to the Senate of Canada on the advice of Prime Minister John Joseph Caldwell Abbott and sat as a Conservative. He also served as Mayor of Limoilou in 1899.

After the 1911 federal election brought the Conservatives into power after a fifteen-year absence, the new prime minister, Robert Laird Borden, appointed Landry to be Speaker of the Senate.

Landry was a prolific author and editor who wrote a number of books on matters of public policy in addition to his writings on agriculture. He was particularly concerned with the rights of French Canadians living outside of Quebec, particularly Franco-Manitobans and Franco-Ontarians and their rights in regards to the Manitoba Schools Question and a similar debate on publicly funded francophone schools in Ontario.

His interests in these questions made him a controversial figure as Speaker when the Senate was considering the issue of francophone schools in Ontario in the wake of the provincial Conservative government's passage of Regulation 17, which restricted French-language instruction. Landry felt passionately about the issue and accepted a position as President of the Franco-Ontarian Association d'éducation while he was Speaker. Many of Landry's rulings were challenged on the floor of the Senate, with several being put to a vote in a departure from the normal practice of accepting a Speaker's ruling as final. In the face of his diminished authority over the upper house and the fact that many of his rulings were being overturned, he absented himself from the Chair for several days, which resulted in calls for the government to dismiss him if he did not resume the Chair. Upon his return, he explained that he had absented himself due to the opposition by several government members to his rulings and the lack of support he enjoyed. Landry continued as Speaker for a further year before resigning. He remained a Senator until his death three years later in Quebec City and devoted much of his time to writing and campaigning on the issue of French-language rights in Ontario.

== Electoral record ==
1878 Canadian federal election: Montmagny
Party	Candidate	Votes
Conservative	Auguste Charles Philippe Robert Landry	784
Liberal	Onésiphore Carbonneau	746

1882 Canadian federal election: Montmagny
Party	Candidate	Votes
Conservative	Auguste Charles Philippe Robert Landry	815
Liberal	Philippe-Auguste Choquette	695

1887 Canadian federal election: Montmagny
Party	Candidate	Votes
Liberal	Philippe-Auguste Choquette	1,071
Conservative	Auguste Charles Philippe Robert Landry	878

== Archives ==
There is a Philippe Landry fonds at Library and Archives Canada.
