= Eugène Paquet =

Canadian politician

The Hon. Eugène Paquet

Senator for Lauzon, Quebec
- In office 1935–1951
- Appointed by: R. B. Bennett
- Preceded by: Henri Sévérin Béland
- Succeeded by: Léonard Tremblay

Member of the Canadian Parliament for L'Islet
- In office 1904–1917
- Preceded by: Onésiphore Carbonneau
- Succeeded by: Fernand Fafard

Personal details
- Born: 23 October 1867 St-Agapit, Quebec, Canada
- Died: 8 May 1951 (aged 83)
- Party: Conservative

Eugène Paquet, PC (23 October 1867 – 8 May 1951) was a Canadian parliamentarian.

Paquet was born in St-Agapit, Quebec, and prior to entering politics studied medicine and practised as a physician. A Conservative, he was first elected to the House of Commons of Canada as Member of Parliament for the Quebec electoral district of L'Islet in the Canadian federal election of 1904, a seat he was to successfully defend in 1908 and 1911. However, he was defeated in the elections of 1921 and 1926. In recognition of his service to the party, he was appointed to the Canadian Senate on 14 August 1935 on the recommendation of Richard Bennett. He represented the senatorial division of Lauzon, Quebec until his death.

1904 Canadian federal election: L'Islet
| Party | Candidate | Votes |
|---|---|---|
| Conservative | Eugène Paquet | 1,195 |
| Liberal | Onésiphore Carbonneau | 1,038 |

1908 Canadian federal election: L'Islet
| Party | Candidate | Votes |
|---|---|---|
| Conservative | Eugène Paquet | 1,349 |
| Liberal | Jean-Baptiste-Thomas Caron | 1,184 |

1911 Canadian federal election: L'Islet
| Party | Candidate | Votes |
|---|---|---|
| Conservative | Eugène Paquet | 1,578 |
| Liberal | Armand Bourgault | 1,144 |

Political offices
| Preceded by Raymond Ducharme Morand (acting) | Minister presiding over the Department of Health; 1926 | Succeeded by James Horace King |
