= Pierre-Raymond-Léonard Martineau =

Canadian politician (1857–1903)

The Hon. Pierre-Raymond-Léonard Martineau

Member of the Canadian Parliament for Montmagny
- In office 14 December 1898 – 31 August 1903
- Preceded by: Philippe-Auguste Choquette
- Succeeded by: Armand Lavergne

Personal details
- Born: February 8, 1857 Montmagny, Canada East
- Died: August 31, 1903 (aged 46) Ottawa
- Party: Liberal

Pierre-Raymond-Léonard Martineau (French pronunciation: [pjɛʁ ʁɛmɔ̃ leɔnaʁ maʁtino]; February 8, 1857 – August 31, 1903) was a lawyer, prothonotary and political figure in Quebec. He represented Montmagny in the House of Commons of Canada from 1898 to 1903 as a Liberal.

He was born in Montmagny, Canada East, the son of Louis Martineau and Adélaide Letellier. Martineau was admitted to the bar in 1882 and set up practice in Montmagny. He was prothonotary for Montmagny district from 1888 to 1896. Martineau was first elected to the House of Commons in an 1898 by-election held after Philippe-Auguste Choquette was named a judge. He died in office in Ottawa at the age of 46.

By-election on 14 December 1898
Party	Candidate	Votes
Liberal	Pierre-Raymond-Léonard Martineau	1,019
Conservative	A. Blouin	489

1900 Canadian federal election: Montmagny
Party	Candidate	Votes
Liberal	Pierre-Raymond-Léonard Martineau	1,186
Conservative	Alphonse Bernier	973
