= Montmagny (provincial electoral district) =

Quebec electoral district

Defunct provincial electoral district
- Legislature: National Assembly of Quebec
- District created: 1867
- District abolished: 1972
- First contested: 1867
- Last contested: 1970

Montmagny (French pronunciation: [mɔ̃maɲi]) was a provincial electoral district in the Chaudière-Appalaches region of Quebec, Canada that elected members to the National Assembly of Quebec.

It was created for the 1867 election (and an electoral district of that name existed earlier in the Legislative Assembly of the Province of Canada). Its final election was in 1970. It disappeared in the 1973 election and its successor electoral district was Montmagny-L'Islet.

== Members of the Legislative Assembly / National Assembly ==
- Louis-Henri Blais, Liberal (1867–1871)
- Télesphore Fournier, Liberal (1871–1873)
- François Langelier, Liberal (1873–1875)
- Auguste-Charles-Philippe Landry, Conservative Party (1875–1876)
- Louis-Napoléon Fortin, Liberal (1876–1883)
- Nazaire Bernatchez, Liberal (1883–1897)
- Joseph-Couillard Lislois, Liberal (1897–1900)
- Ernest Roy, Liberal (1900–1908)
- Armand Renaud Lavergne, Ligue nationaliste canadienne (1908–1916)
- Joseph Elzéar Masson, Liberal (1916–1919)
- Charles-Abraham Paquet, Liberal (1919–1935)
- Joseph-Ernest Grégoire, Action liberale nationale – Union Nationale (1935–1939)
- Fernand Choquette, Liberal (1939–1948)
- Antoine Rivard, Union Nationale (1948–1960)
- Laurent Lizotte, Liberal (1960–1962)
- Jean-Paul Cloutier, Union Nationale (1962–1973)
