= Louis-Napoléon Fortin =

Canadian politician (1850–1892)

Member of the Legislative Assembly of Quebec for Montmagny
- In office 1876–1883
- Preceded by: Auguste Charles Philippe Robert Landry
- Succeeded by: Nazaire Bernatchez

Personal details
- Born: August 8, 1850 Cap-Saint-Ignace, Canada East
- Died: March 31, 1892 (aged 41) Cap-Saint-Ignace, Quebec
- Party: Liberal (1876-1879); Conservative (1879-1883)
- Relations: Jean-Baptiste Fortin, grandfather

Louis-Napoléon Fortin (August 8, 1850 – March 31, 1892) was a physician and political figure in Quebec. He represented Montmagny in the Legislative Assembly of Quebec from 1876 to 1883 as a Liberal and then Conservative member.

He was born in Cap-Saint-Ignace, the son of Louis Fortin and Marguerite Bernier. Fortin was the grandson of Jean-Baptiste Fortin. He was educated at the Collège de Sainte-Anne-de-la-Pocatière and the Université Laval. He qualified to practise in 1874 and set up his practice at Cap-Saint-Ignace. Fortier was first elected to the Quebec assembly in an 1876 by-election held after the election of Auguste-Charles-Philippe Landry was overturned. In 1879, he joined the Conservative caucus with three other members, leading to the defeat of the Liberal government. His election in 1881 was overturned after a decision by the Quebec Superior Court in 1883. Fortin was mayor of Cap-Saint-Ignace from 1881 to 1883. In 1881, he married Marie-Sophie-Laurette Larue. He was named a colonization inspector but was dismissed from that post in 1887. Fortin died at Cap-Saint-Ignace at the age of 41.
