= François Fortunat Rouleau =

Canadian politician

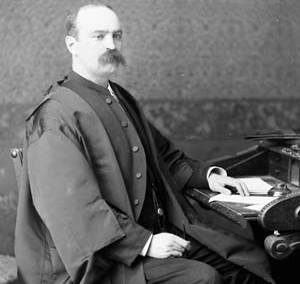
François Fortunat Rouleau Source: Library and Archives Canada

François Fortunat Rouleau (4 July 1849 – 16 December 1907) was a lawyer and political figure in Quebec. He represented Dorchester in the House of Commons of Canada from 1874 to 1882 as a Liberal-Conservative member.

He was born in Sainte-Claire, Canada East, the son of François Rouleau and Luce Labonté, was educated at the Laval Normal School and the Université Laval, and was called to the Quebec bar in 1870. Rouleau practised law in Quebec City. In 1878, he married J.J. Alphonsine Peachy. His election in 1874 was overturned after an appeal but he won the subsequent by-election in 1875. Rouleau served as clerk assistant of the House of Commons from 1882 to 1897. He was an unsuccessful candidate for a seat in the House of Commons in 1900. Rouleau died in Sainte-Claire at the age of 58.

== Elections ==
1874 Canadian federal election: Dorchester
Party	Candidate	Votes
Liberal–Conservative	François Fortunat Rouleau	895
Unknown	E.H. Marceau	874
Source: Canadian Elections Database

By-election on 14 December 1875 Rouleau unseated on petition, 8 July 1875
Party	Candidate	Votes
Liberal–Conservative	François Fortunat Rouleau	1,086
Unknown	Alfred Morrisset	620

1878 Canadian federal election: Dorchester
Party	Candidate	Votes
Liberal–Conservative	François Fortunat Rouleau	1,081
Unknown	H. Marceau	362
