= Fernand Choquette =

Canadian politician (1895–1975)

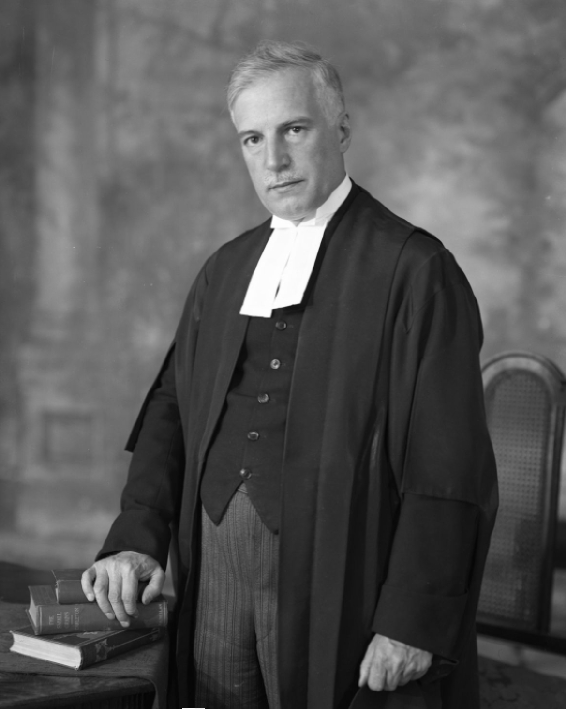

Member of the Legislative Assembly of Quebec for Montmagny
- In office 1939–1948
- Preceded by: Joseph-Ernest Grégoire
- Succeeded by: Antoine Rivard

Personal details
- Born: October 27, 1895 Montmagny, Quebec
- Died: January 17, 1975 (aged 79) Quebec City, Quebec
- Party: Liberal
- Relations: Philippe-Auguste Choquette, father
- Children: Auguste Choquette

Fernand Choquette, CC (French pronunciation: [fɛʁnɑ̃ ʃɔkɛt]; October 27, 1895 – January 17, 1975) was a Canadian Quebec MNA and judge of the Quebec Court of Appeal from 1956 until 1970. He also worked as a lawyer for over 10 years and a teacher for over 20 years.

Born in Montmagny, Quebec, the son of Philippe-Auguste Choquette and Marie Bender, he received a B.A. in 1915 and an LL.B in 1918 from Université Laval. He married Marguerite Vallerand in 1922.

Defeated in the 1935 and 1936 provincial elections, Choquette served two terms as a member of the Quebec Liberal Party from 1939 to 1948 for the riding of Montmagny (now part of Montmagny-L'Islet).

In 1972 he was made a Companion of the Order of Canada "for his contribution to the advancement of law".
