= Noël Drouin =

Canadian politician

Member of Parliament for Dorchester
- In office March 1958 – June 1962
- Preceded by: J.-Armand Landry
- Succeeded by: Pierre-André Boutin

Personal details
- Born: 7 July 1912 Saint-Maxime, Quebec, Canada
- Died: 5 October 2001 (aged 89) Saint-Isidore, Chaudière-Appalaches, Quebec, Canada
- Party: Progressive Conservative
- Profession: manufacturer

Noël Drouin (7 July 1912 – 5 October 2001) was a Progressive Conservative party member of the House of Commons of Canada. Born in Saint-Maxime, Quebec, he was a manufacturer by career, and also served as mayor of Saint-Maxime.

He was first elected at the Dorchester riding in the 1958 general election. After serving his only federal term, the 24th Canadian Parliament, he was defeated in the 1962 election by Pierre-André Boutin of the Social Credit party.
