= Nazaire Bernatchez =

Canadian politician

Member of the Legislative Assembly of Quebec for Montmagny
- In office 1883–1897
- Preceded by: Louis-Napoléon Fortin
- Succeeded by: Joseph-Couillard Lislois

Personal details
- Born: February 13, 1838 Montmagny, Lower Canada
- Died: August 29, 1906 (aged 68) Quebec City, Quebec
- Party: Liberal

Nazaire Bernatchez (February 13, 1838 – August 29, 1906) was a farmer, merchant and political figure in Quebec. He represented Montmagny in the Legislative Assembly of Quebec from 1886 to 1897 as a Liberal.

== Life ==
He was born in Saint-Thomas-de-la-Pointe-à-la-Caille, Lower Canada, the son of Jean-Baptiste Bernatchez and Marie Talbot dit Gervais, and was educated in Montmagny. In 1859, he married Henriette Couillard Després. Bernatchez was postmaster at Montmagny and was mayor of Saint-Thomas-de-la-Pointe-à-la-Caille and warden for Montmagny County from 1877 to 1883. He also operated a shipping company linking Montmagny and Quebec City. Bernatchez was defeated in 1881 by Louis-Napoléon Fortin, but he was declared elected by the Quebec Superior Court in 1883. He was reelected in 1886, 1890 and 1892, but was defeated by Joseph-Couillard Lislois when he ran for reelection in 1897. Bernatchez served as governor for the prison at Quebec City from 1897 until his death in Quebec City in 1906. He was buried in Montmagny.
