= Pierre-André Boutin =

Canadian politician and teacher

Member of the Canadian Parliament for Dorchester
- In office 1962–1965
- Preceded by: Noël Drouin
- Succeeded by: Gustave Côté

Personal details
- Born: December 2, 1934 Sainte-Marguerite, Québec, Canada
- Died: November 19, 2021 (aged 86) Levis, Quebec, Canada
- Party: Social Credit Party
- Occupation: teacher

Pierre-André Boutin (December 2, 1934 – November 19, 2021) was a Canadian politician and teacher. Born in Sainte-Marguerite, Québec, he was elected to the House of Commons of Canada in 1962 as a Member of the Social Credit Party to represent the riding of Dorchester. He was re-elected in 1963, then defeated in 1965. He died on November 19, 2021 at the age of 86.
