= Pierre Baillargeon (politician) =

Canadian politician

The Hon. Pierre Baillargeon
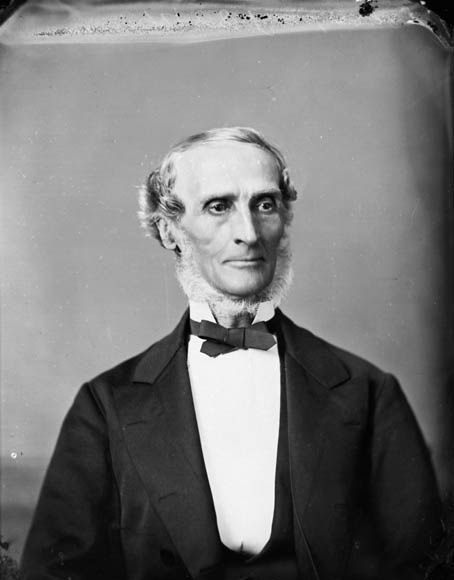

Senator for Stadacona, Quebec
- In office 1874–1891
- Appointed by: Alexander Mackenzie
- Preceded by: Pierre-Joseph-Olivier Chauveau
- Succeeded by: Auguste Charles Philippe Robert Landry

Personal details
- Born: November 8, 1812 Île-aux-Grues, Lower Canada
- Died: December 15, 1891 (aged 79)
- Party: Liberal

Pierre Baillargeon (November 8, 1812 – December 15, 1891) was a physician and political figure in Quebec. He sat for Stadacona division in the Senate of Canada from 1874 to 1891.

He was born in Île-aux-Grues, Lower Canada, the son of François Baillargeon and Marie-Louise Langlois dit Saint-Jean, and was educated at the Collège de Nicolet. Baillargeon received an MD from Harvard University. He was a member of the Boston Medical Society and a visiting physician at the Quebec General Hospital in Quebec City. In 1842, he married Geneviève, the daughter of Joseph Painchaud. Baillargeon died in office at the age of 79.

His brother Charles-François Baillargeon was archbishop of Quebec.
