= Joseph Arthur Lesage =

Canadian politician

The Hon. Joseph Arthur Lesage

Senator for Gulf, Quebec
- In office 3 March 1944 – 9 March 1950
- Appointed by: William Lyon Mackenzie King
- Preceded by: David Ovide L'Espérance
- Succeeded by: Charles Gavan Power

Personal details
- Born: Joseph Arthur Lesage; 7 June 1881 Louiseville, Quebec
- Died: 9 March 1950 (aged 68) Sillery, Quebec
- Party: Liberal
- Spouse: Emma Lachapelle
- Profession: insurance broker

Joseph Arthur Lesage (7 June 1881 – 9 March 1950) was a Liberal party member of the Senate of Canada. He was born in Louiseville, Quebec and became an insurance broker. He was the uncle of Jean Lesage.

The son of Hercule Lesage and Émilie Caron, he was educated at Louiseville College and the Laval Normal School. He married Emma Lachapelle in 1911. Lesage served as an alderman for Quebec City from 1918 to 1926. He was president of Lesage Proteau Ltd. and Les publications Cartier, Ltée and vice-president of Yellow Taxi Ltd.

He was appointed to the Senate for the Gulf, Quebec division on 3 March 1944 following nomination by Prime Minister William Lyon Mackenzie King. Lesage remained in that role until his death on 9 March 1950.
