= Charles Alexander Lesage =

Canadian politician

Charles Alexandre Lesage (February 25, 1843 – May 15, 1893) was a physician and political figure in Quebec. He represented Dorchester in the House of Commons of Canada as a Conservative member from 1882 to 1887.

He was born in St-Grégoire-le-Grand (later part of Bécancour), Canada East, the son of F. Lesage, and was educated at the Université Laval. In 1867, he married Eleanor Vezina. Lesage was defeated by Henri Jules Juchereau Duchesnay when he ran for reelection in 1887.

== Electoral record ==
1882 Canadian federal election: Dorchester
Party	Candidate	Votes
Conservative	Charles Alexander Lesage	acclaimed

1887 Canadian federal election: Dorchester
Party	Candidate	Votes
Nationalist Conservative	Henri Jules Juchereau Duchesnay	1,565
Conservative	Charles Alexander Lesage	1,089
