= Louis-Henri Blais =

Canadian politician

Member of the Legislative Assembly of Quebec for Montmagny
- In office 1867–1871
- Succeeded by: Télesphore Fournier

Personal details
- Born: June 9, 1827 Montmagny, Lower Canada
- Died: August 21, 1899 (aged 72) Montmagny, Quebec
- Party: Liberal

Louis-Henri Blais (June 9, 1827 – August 21, 1899) was a prominent lawyer and political figure in Quebec. He served as the representative for Montmagny in the Legislative Assembly of Quebec from 1867 to 1871 as a Liberal.

Born in Montmagny, Lower Canada, Blais was the son of Louis Blais and Marie-Madeleine Noël. Blais received his education at the Collège de Sainte-Anne-de-la-Pocatière, was admitted to the Quebec bar in 1851, and subsequently established his legal practice in Montmagny. He served as president of the Agricultural Society for Montmagny County. Blais was married twice: first to Marie-Anne-Herméline Fournier in 1849, and then to Eugénie Blais in 1872. In 1863, Blais made an unsuccessful bid to represent Montmagny in the legislative assembly for the Province of Canada. Blais died in Montmagny at the age of 72.
