= Joseph-Octave Beaubien =

Canadian politician (1824–1877)

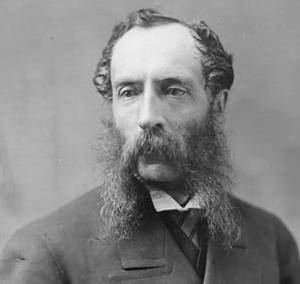

Member of the Canadian Parliament for Montmagny
- In office 1867–1872
- Succeeded by: Henri-Thomas Taschereau

Member of the Legislative Council of Quebec for De la Durantaye
- In office November 2, 1867 – 1877
- Succeeded by: Édouard Rémillard

Member of the Legislative Assembly of the Province of Canada for Montmagny
- In office 1858–1866
- Preceded by: Louis-Napoléon Casault
- Succeeded by: Replaced with the Canadian House of Commons

Personal details
- Born: March 22, 1824 Nicolet, Lower Canada
- Died: November 7, 1877 (aged 53) Montmagny, Quebec
- Party: Conservative

Joseph-Octave Beaubien (March 22, 1824 – November 7, 1877) was a Quebec medical doctor and political figure. He represented Montmagny in the 1st Canadian Parliament as a Conservative member.

He was born in Nicolet in Lower Canada in 1824, studied at the college there and then studied English in Rochester, New York. He returned and studied medicine, becoming a doctor in 1847 and settled at Montmagny. He was elected to represent Montmagny in the Legislative Assembly of the Province of Canada in 1857, 1861 and 1863; he was reelected after Confederation. He served in the cabinet as Commissioner of Crown Lands. He was also named to the Legislative Council of Quebec for La Durantaye division in 1867 and served until his death. He operated large farms at Montmagny and Cap-Saint-Ignace. Beaubien served as lieutenant-colonel in the local militia. He was also a director for the Canadian Pacific Railway.

He died in Montmagny in 1877.

He was the nephew of Pierre Beaubien, who had also been a member in the Legislative Assembly from Canada East. His daughter, Caroline-Alix, married Jules-Joseph-Taschereau Frémont, who later became a member of the House of Commons.

== Electoral record ==
1867 Canadian federal election: Montmagny
Party	Candidate	Votes
Conservative	Joseph-Octave Beaubien	acclaimed
Source: Canadian Elections Database

1872 Canadian federal election: Montmagny
Party	Candidate	Votes
Liberal	Henri-Thomas Taschereau	675
Conservative	Joseph-Octave Beaubien	594
Source: Canadian Elections Database
