= Joseph-Couillard Lislois =

Canadian politician

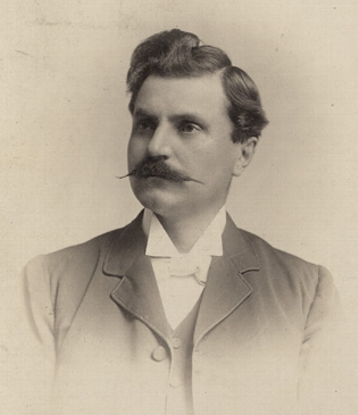

Member of the Legislative Assembly of Quebec for Montmagny
- In office 1897–1900
- Preceded by: Nazaire Bernatchez
- Succeeded by: Joseph Alfred Ernest Roy

Personal details
- Born: January 8, 1856 Montmagny, Canada East
- Died: February 4, 1935 (aged 79) Montmagny, Quebec
- Party: Liberal

Joseph-Couillard Lislois (January 8, 1856 – February 4, 1935) was a Canadian politician in the province of Quebec.

Born in Montmagny, Canada East, the son of Charles-Couillard Lislois and Geneviève Nicol, Lislois was mayor of Montmagny from 1890 to 1896 and again from 1898 to 1901. He was elected to the Legislative Assembly of Quebec for Montmagny in 1897. He did not run in 1900 and was defeated in the 1908 election.
