= Henri-Jules Juchereau Duchesnay =

Canadian politician (1845–1887)

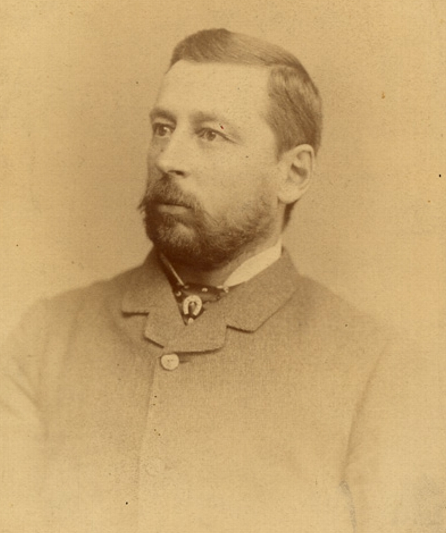

Member of the Canadian Parliament for Dorchester
- In office April 13, 1887 – July 6, 1887
- Preceded by: Charles Alexander Lesage
- Succeeded by: Honoré Julien Jean-Baptiste Chouinard

Personal details
- Born: July 6, 1845 Sainte-Marie-de-la-Nouvelle-Beauce (Sainte-Marie), Canada East
- Died: July 6, 1887 (aged 42) Sainte-Marie, Quebec
- Party: Nationalist Conservative
- Relations: Elzéar-Henri Juchereau Duchesnay, father
- Education: St. IIves tion =

Henri-Jules Juchereau Duchesnay (July 6, 1845 – July 6, 1887) was a lawyer, farmer and political figure in Quebec. He represented Dorchester in the House of Commons of Canada in 1887 as a Nationalist Conservative member.

He was born in Sainte-Marie-de-la-Nouvelle-Beauce, Canada East, the son of seigneur Elzéar-Henri Juchereau Duchesnay and Élisabeth-Suzanne Taschereau, who was the daughter of Jean-Thomas Taschereau. He was educated at the Petit Séminaire de Québec, the Université Laval and McGill University. Juchereau Duchesnay was called to the Lower Canada bar in 1866 and first practised in Quebec City, later moving back to Sainte-Marie. In 1869, he married Caroline Têtu. He was named a lieutenant-colonel in the militia and also served as stipendiary magistrate for Beauce County, inspector of mines in the Beauce region, mayor of Sainte-Marie-de-Beauce and warden for Beauce County. In 1882, he established a local creamery, which had what are believed to be the first centrifugal cream separators installed in North America. In 1885, "Juchereau" Duchesnay spoke against the execution of Louis Riel. After being elected in the 1887 federal election, he died in office at Sainte-Marie later that same year of typhoid fever at the age of 42.

He was succeeded in the House of Commons by his brother-in-law Honoré Julien Jean-Baptiste Chouinard.
