= Coteau-du-Lac =

- City
- Coteau-du-Lac in 2026

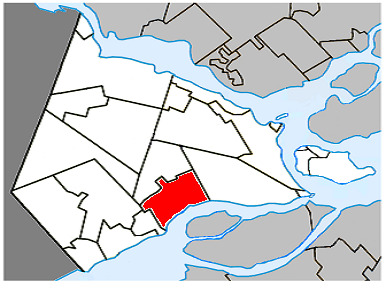
- Location within Vaudreuil-Soulanges RCM

- Location in southern Quebec
- Coordinates: 45°18′N 74°11′W
- Country: Canada
- Province: Quebec
- Region: Montérégie
- RCM: Vaudreuil-Soulanges
- Constituted: 6 February 1982

Government
  - Mayor: Andrée Brosseau
  - Federal riding: Beauharnois—Salaberry—Soulanges—Huntingdon
  - Prov. riding: Soulanges

Area
  - Total: 57.20 km^{2} (22.09 sq mi)
  - Land: 46.87 km^{2} (18.10 sq mi)

Population (2021)
  - Total: 7,473
  - Density: 159.4/km^{2} (413/sq mi)
  - Pop 2016-2021: ▲6.1%
  - Dwellings: 3,025
- Time zone: UTC−5 (EST)
  - Summer (DST): UTC−4 (EDT)
- Postal code(s): J0P
- Area codes: 450 and 579
- Highways A-20: R-201; R-338
- Website: www.coteau-du-lac.com

Coteau-du-Lac (French pronunciation: [kɔto dy lak]) is a small city in southwestern Quebec, Canada. It is on the north shore of the St. Lawrence River in the Vaudreuil-Soulanges Regional County Municipality, about 50 km southwest of Montréal.

The name of the town comes from the French word coteau which means "slope" and from its location on the north shore of Lake Saint Francis. The National Historic Site of Canada of the Coteau-du-Lac canal is the location of the first canal lock system in North America. The city has an industrial park.

The population was 7,473 at the 2021 Canadian Census.

== History ==
The place was mentioned in 1687 by the Marquis de Denonville. His record stated that "Costeau du Lac is a place where one stopped on the way to the Rapides d'en Haut", referring to a small hillside (French: coteau) on the north side of the St. Lawrence River near the mouth of Lake Saint Francis (French: lac Saint-François).

In 1779, the Coteau-du-Lac canal was constructed to bypass the numerous rapids between Lake Saint-Louis and Lake Saint-Francis. Two years later, a military detachment was stationed there. In 1789, its post office opened under the name Coteau-du-Lac.

During the War of 1812, a fort was built to protect the canal. In 1832, the Parish of Saint-Ignace was created. The following year, the parish was civilly established under the name "Saint Ignace du Côteau du Lac". In 1845, it was formed into a municipality, but abolished in 1847. In 1855, it was reestablished as the Parish Municipality of Saint-Ignace-du-Côteau-du-Lac.

In 1907, the Village Municipality of Côteau-du-Lac was formed out of Saint-Ignace-du-Côteau-du-Lac (orthography was later changed to "Coteau" without circumflex). These two entities merged again on 6 February 1982, to form the Municipality of Coteau-du-Lac, which changed statutes in 2007 to become a city.

In mid-2013, around 120 people were temporarily evacuated, and two people died after an explosion in the local fireworks factory.

In early April 2023, 3,672 people lost electric power for up to several days as the result of a massive power outage caused by an extended period of freezing rain in the region.

== Demographics ==
Historical census populations – Coteau-du-Lac, Quebec
| Year | Pop. | ±% |
|---|---|---|
| 1986 | 3,547 | — |
| 1991 | 4,193 | +18.2% |
| 1996 | 4,960 | +18.3% |
| 2001 | 5,573 | +12.4% |
| 2006 | 6,346 | +13.9% |
| 2011 | 6,842 | +7.8% |
| 2016 | 7,044 | +3.0% |
| 2021 | 7,473 | +6.1% |
Source: Statistics Canada

In the 2021 Census of Population conducted by Statistics Canada, Coteau-du-Lac had a population of 7,473 living in 2,928 of its 3,025 total private dwellings, a change of 6.1% from its 2016 population of 7,044. With a land area of 46.87 km^{2} (18.10 sq mi), it had a population density of 159.4/km^{2} (413.0/sq mi) in 2021.

Canada census – Coteau-du-Lac community profile

| | 2021 | 2016 | 2011 |
| Population | 7,473 (+6.1% from 2016) | 7,044 (3.0% from 2011) | 6,842 (+7.8% from 2006) |
| Land area | 46.87 km^{2} (18.10 sq mi) | 46.89 km^{2} (18.10 sq mi) | 47.06 km^{2} (18.17 sq mi) |
| Population density | 159.4/km^{2} (413/sq mi) | 150.2/km^{2} (389/sq mi) | 145.4/km^{2} (377/sq mi) |
| Median age | 44.0 (M: 43.6, F: 44.4) | 41.6 (M: 41.3, F: 41.8) | 39.0 (M: 39.0, F: 38.9) |
| Private dwellings | 3,025 (total) 2,928 (occupied) | 2,743 (total) | 2,631 (total) |
| Median household income | $91,000 | $80,268 | $71,517 |

References: 2021 2016 2011

Canada Census Mother Tongue – Coteau-du-Lac, Quebec
| Census | Total | French | | | English | | | French & English | | | Other | | |
| Year | Responses | Count | Trend | Pop % | Count | Trend | Pop % | Count | Trend | Pop % | Count | Trend | Pop % |
| 2021 | 7,285 | 6,545 | ▲0.8% | 89.8% | 365 | ▲15.9% | 5.0% | 120 | ▲60.0% | 1.6% | 215 | ▲72.0% | 3.0% |
| 2016 | 7,015 | 6,495 | ▲2.3% | 92.6% | 315 | ▲31.3% | 4.5% | 75 | ▲36.4% | 1.1% | 125 | ▲60.0% | 1.8% |
| 2011 | 6,720 | 6,350 | ▲6.5% | 94.5% | 240 | ▲71.4% | 3.6% | 55 | ▲22.2% | 0.8% | 75 | ▼16.7% | 1.1% |
| 2006 | 6,235 | 5,960 | ▲14.2% | 95.6% | 140 | ▼17.6% | 2.3% | 45 | ▲28.6% | 0.7% | 90 | ▲200.0% | 1.4% |
| 2001 | 5,455 | 5,220 | ▲11.2% | 95.7% | 170 | ▲28.6% | 3.1% | 35 | 0.0% | 0.6% | 30 | 0.0% | 0.6% |
| 1996 | 4,895 | 4,695 | n/a | 95.9% | 135 | n/a | 2.8% | 35 | n/a | 0.7% | 30 | n/a | 0.6% |
Note: Percentages may not equal 100% due to multiple responses and rounding.

== Government ==
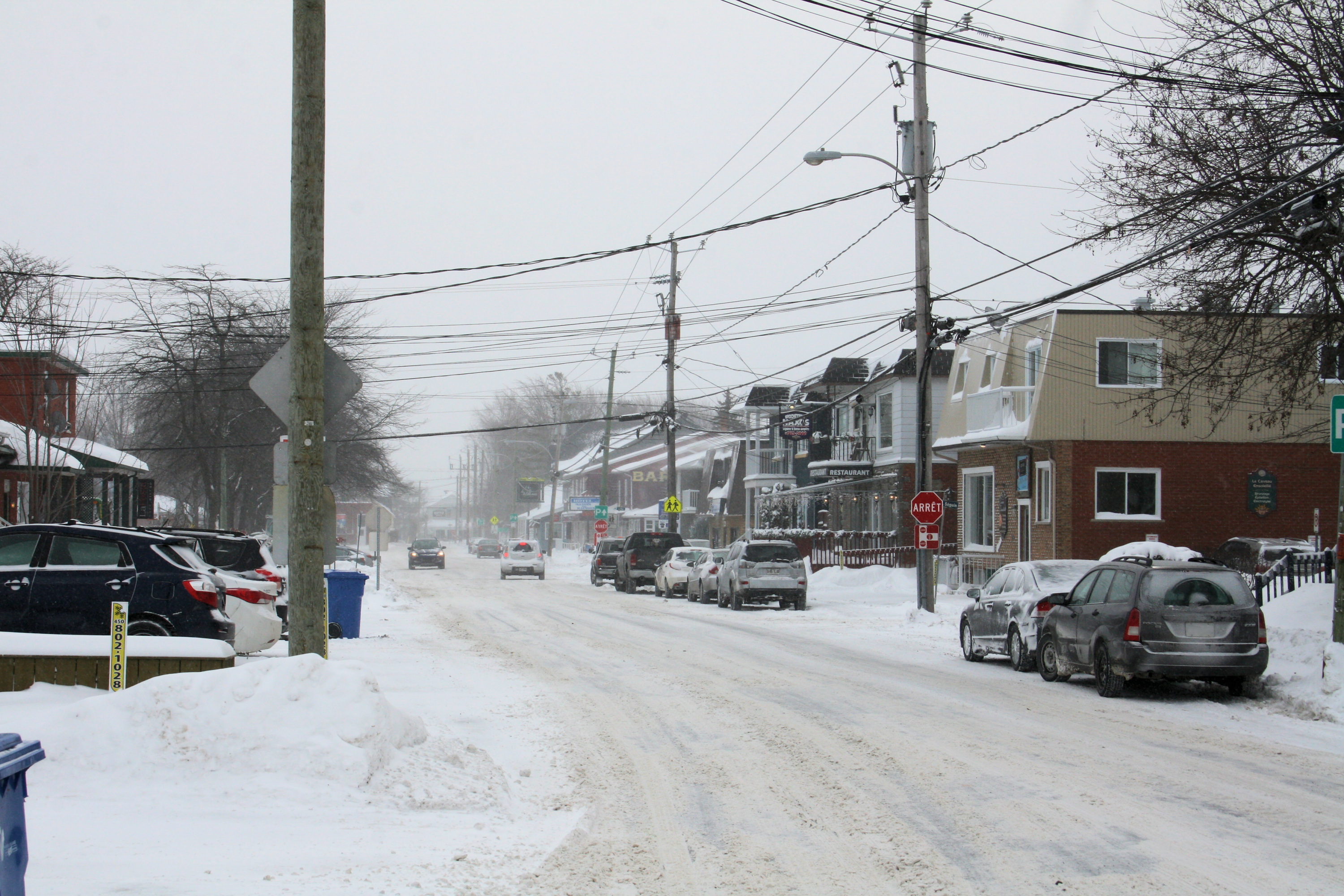
Coteau-du-Lac in winter

List of former mayors (since formation of current municipality):

- Joseph Henri Paul Fernand Desforges (1982–1989)
- Pierre Chevrier (1989–1996)
- Robert Sauvé (1996–2013)
- Guy Jasmin (2013–2017)
- Andrée Brosseau (2017–present)

== Education ==
Commission Scolaire des Trois-Lacs operates Francophone schools.

- École de Coteau-du-Lac (pavillons Académie-Wilson, de l'Éclusière, and Saint-Ignace)

Lester B. Pearson School Board operates Anglophone schools.

- Evergreen Elementary and Forest Hill Elementary (Junior Campus and Senior campus) in Saint-Lazare or Soulanges Elementary School in Saint-Télesphore

== Notable people ==
- Jules Fournier (1884–1918) was a Canadian writer and newspaper owner

== See also ==
- List of cities in Quebec
