= Adine Fafard-Drolet =

Canadian opera singer

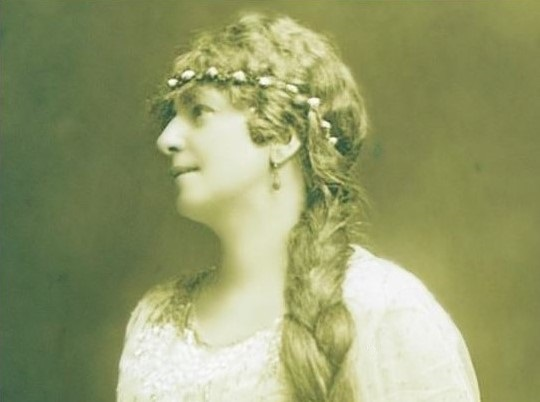
Adine Fafard-Drolet, c. 1910

Adine Fafard-Drolet (May 3, 1876 – January 31, 1963) was a Canadian soprano and the founder of a music school, the Conservatory of Quebec, that lasted from 1910 to 1939.

== Life ==
She was born Marie-Claire-Adine Fafard in L'Islet, about 40 miles east of Quebec City, Canada. Her parents were Louis-Auguste Fafard (who died in a collision in 1897) and Alphonsine Couillard Dupuis. She had six siblings, among whom her brother Fernand would become a member of the House of Commons of Canada. Her musical ability emerged early, and she received her first formal training in music in 1893, winning prizes the following year and again in 1896.

In 1903, she married Elzéar N. P. Drolet, a notary. Following her marriage, she used the name Madame E. Drolet for professional appearances until Elzéar's death in 1905. Their son Yvan was born a few months later and died as an infant. After Elzéar's death, Adine adopted Fafard-Drolet as her surname.

She died in Lac-Etchemin, Quebec.

== Musical career ==
By 1903, Fafard-Drolet, a dramatic soprano, was appearing regularly around L'Islet and Quebec City. In 1907 she went to Europe for two years of further training, studying in London at the Royal College of Music and in Paris with the baritone Jean-Baptiste Faure. She gave several concerts in Europe and in one of these sang for King Alfonso XIII of Spain. She auditioned for the composer Jules Massenet and was offered a leading role in his unfinished opera Don Quichotte; however, she declined because of her plan to return to Canada and found a conservatory.

Fafard-Drolet returned to Canada in 1909 and gave a series of concerts around Quebec City and L'Islet. In 1910 or 1911, with advice from the organist Ernest Gagnon, she founded a music school, the Conservatoire de Québec (Conservatory of Quebec, referred to informally as the Fafard-Drolet Conservatory). Fafard-Drolet taught there according to what was known as the Marchesi method. The training was free thanks to an annual subsidy from the then-Premier of Quebec, Lomer Gouin, and the course of study was designed to last three years. Students were taught music theory, music history, voice, phonetics, piano, violin, cello, and harmonium; later Gregorian chant was added to the list.

The conservatory moved within Quebec City at least six times before closing its doors in 1939 at the onset of World War II.

In the early 1920s, Fafard-Drolet also taught singing in secondary schools.

In 1928, she was awarded a silver medal by the Lieutenant-Governor of Quebec, Narcisse Pérodeau, for her founding of and work with the conservatory.

== Honors ==
The city of Quebec has put up a plaque in her honor at 25 Rue Mont-Carmel, where she lived from 1921 to 1923. In addition, Rue Adine Fafard (Adine Fafard Street) in Quebec City is named for her.

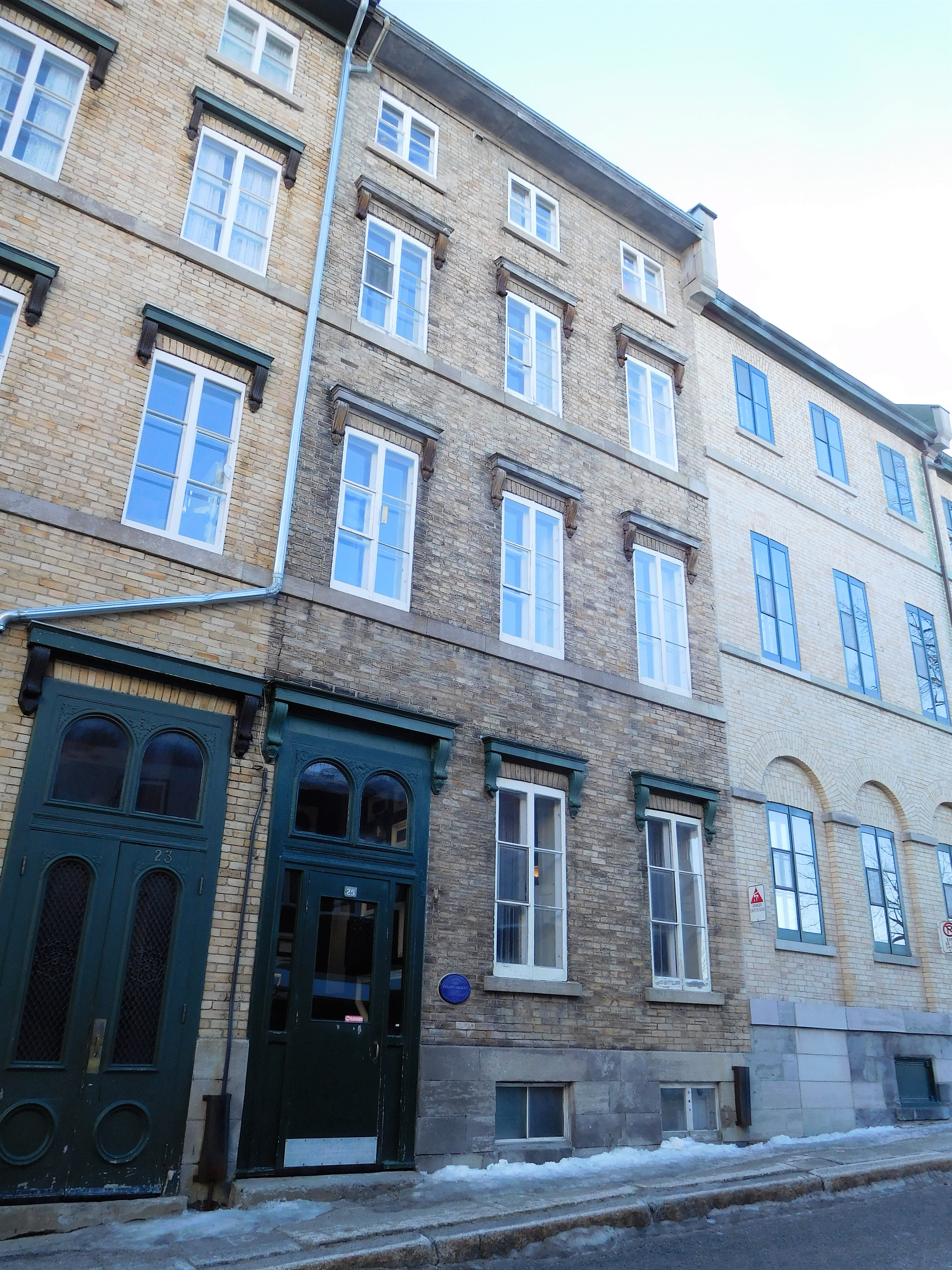
25, rue Mont-Carmel

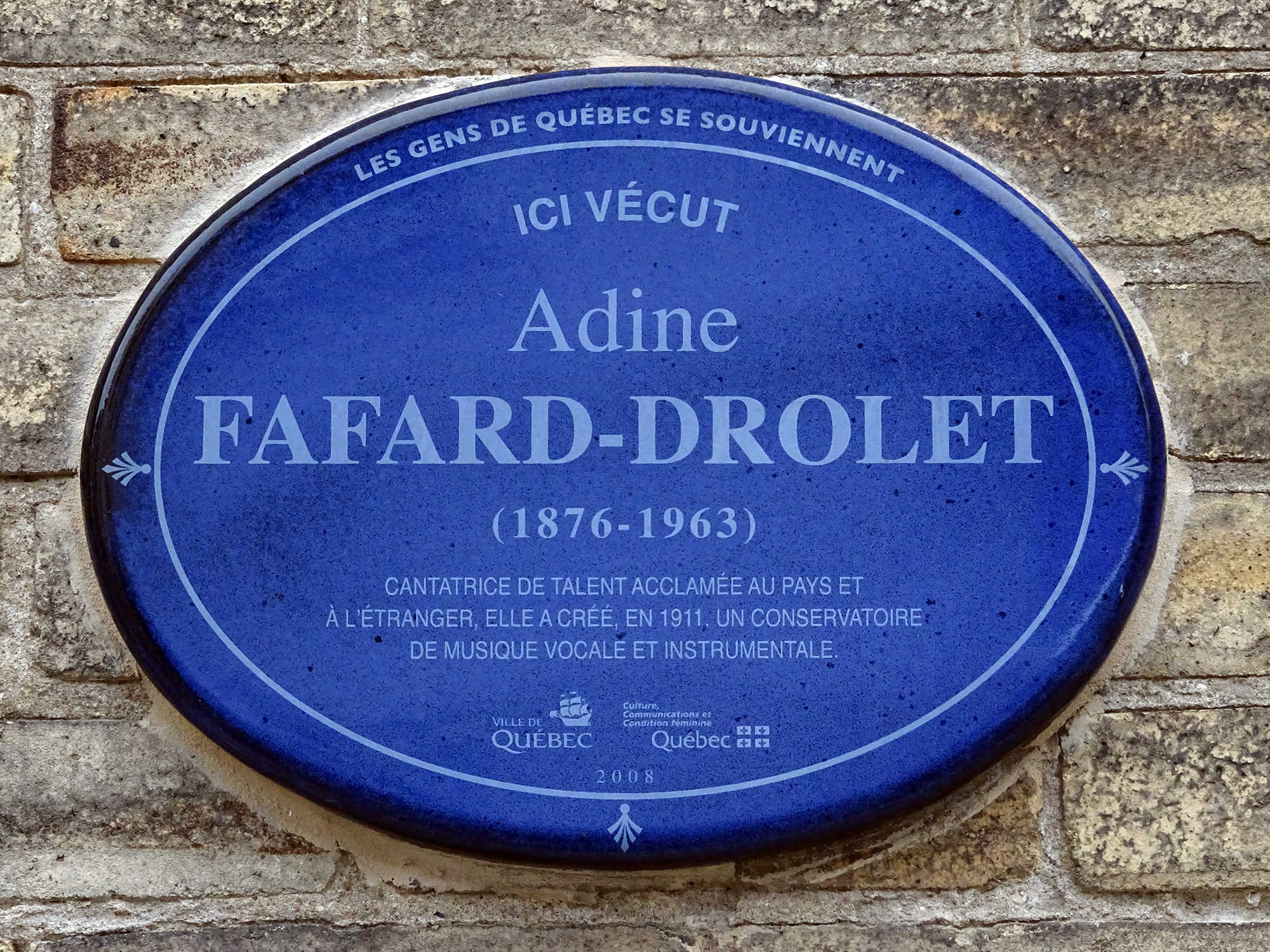
Plaque
