= Ligue nationaliste canadienne =

The Ligue nationaliste canadienne, also known as the Ligue nationaliste (Nationalist League), was a nationalist and anti-imperialist organization in Quebec, Canada, during the early 20th century. Founded by Henri Bourassa and journalist Olivar Asselin, the newspaper Le Nationaliste was its official organ until 1910, when Bourassa founded Le Devoir which became the Ligue's mouthpiece.

The party was created on 1 March 1903 to counter what was perceived to be the evils of imperialism and to instill a pan-Canadian nationalist spirit in the Francophone population. The League opposed political dependence on either Britain or the United States, supporting instead Canadian autonomy within the British Empire.

In the 1908 Quebec election, the Ligue won three seats in the Quebec Legislative Assembly; Bourassa won in two seats (Montreal Division #2 and Saint-Hyacinthe) and chose to sit for the latter, and Armand Lavergne was elected in Montmagny. Bourassa did not run for re-election in 1912 Quebec election; Lavergne served as the party's only member until leaving office in the 1916 election.

== See also ==
- Quebec nationalism
- Politics of Quebec
- History of Quebec
- Timeline of Quebec history
