= Jean-Thomas Taschereau (judge) =

Judge of the Supreme Court of Canada (1814–1893)

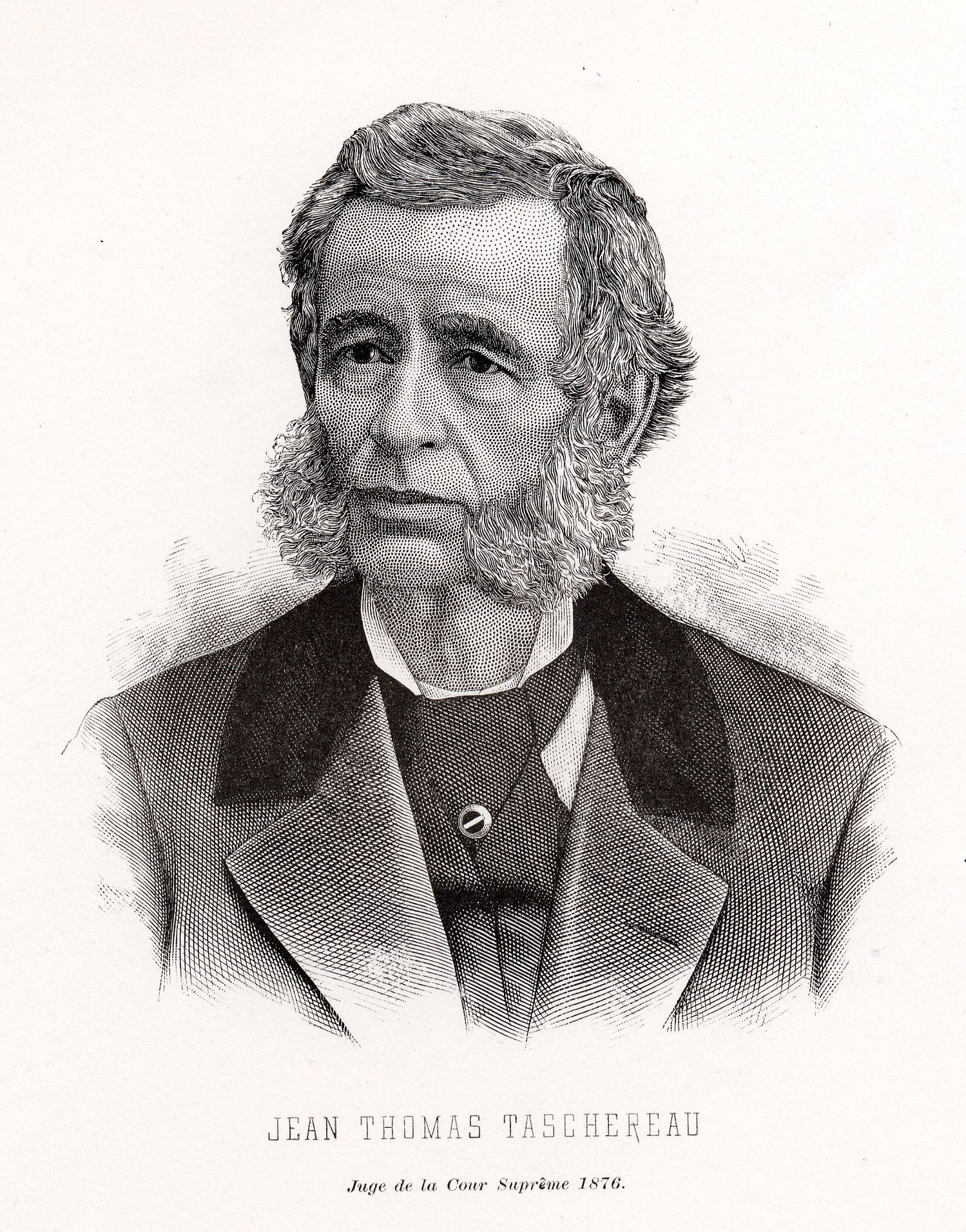

Puisne Justice of the Supreme Court of Canada
- In office September 30, 1875 – October 6, 1878
- Nominated by: Alexander Mackenzie
- Preceded by: None (new position)
- Succeeded by: Henri Elzéar Taschereau

Personal details
- Born: December 12, 1814 Quebec City, Lower Canada
- Died: November 9, 1893 (aged 78) Quebec City, Quebec
- Relations: Elzéar-Alexandre Taschereau (brother)
- Children: Louis-Alexandre Taschereau, Henri-Thomas Taschereau
- Parent: Jean-Thomas Taschereau

Jean-Thomas Taschereau (French pronunciation: [ʒɑ̃ tɔma taʃʁo]; December 12, 1814 – November 9, 1893) was a Canadian lawyer and judge.

== Biography ==
Taschereau was born in Quebec City, Lower Canada (now Quebec), the son of Jean-Thomas Taschereau and Marie Panet. His father was a judge of the Court of King's Bench of Quebec, and his mother was the daughter of Jean-Antoine Panet, the first Speaker of the Legislative Assembly of Lower Canada. His younger brother Elzéar-Alexandre Taschereau was the first Canadian Cardinal of the Roman Catholic Church and served as Archbishop of Quebec from 1871 until his death in 1898. His great-uncle Bernard-Claude Panet also served as Archbishop of Quebec (1825–1833).

Taschereau was called to the bar in 1836. He studied law in Paris and upon his return to Quebec City where he practised for 18 years. He also taught at Université Laval from 1855 to 1857. In 1865, he was appointed a judge of the Quebec Superior Court, and in 1873, was appointed to the Court of Queen's Bench of Quebec. On September 30, 1875, he was appointed to the Supreme Court of Canada. Taschereau was offered the position by the Mackenzie government with the expectation he would decline the offer because he would not want to move to Ottawa. The offer was also political maneuvering as Taschereau was a Conservative. On October 6, 1878, he retired from the court.

He was the father of Louis-Alexandre Taschereau, a Liberal Premier of the Canadian province of Quebec from 1920 to 1936 and Sir Henri-Thomas Taschereau, Chief Justice of Quebec 1907-1909
