= Gustave Côté =

Canadian politician

- Official 1966 portrait

Member of Parliament for Dorchester
- In office November 1965 – 1968

Personal details
- Born: 17 October 1913 Sainte-Claire, Quebec
- Died: 13 April 2001 (aged 87)
- Party: Liberal
- Profession: engineer, industrial designer, industrialist

Gustave Côté (17 October 1913 – 13 April 2001) was a Liberal party member of the House of Commons of Canada. He was born in Sainte-Claire, Quebec and became an engineer, industrial designer and industrialist by career.

He was elected at the Dorchester riding in the 1965 general election. After completing his only term, the 27th Canadian Parliament, Côté left Parliament and did not seek another term in federal office.
