= Joseph-Armand Landry =

Canadian politician (1918–1985)

J. Armand Landry

Member of Parliament for Dorchester
- In office June 1957 – March 1958

Personal details
- Born: Joseph-Armand Landry; 14 December 1918 Magdalen Islands, Quebec
- Died: 23 March 1985 (aged 66) Ste-Foy, Quebec
- Party: Liberal
- Profession: accountant, insurance broker, manager

Joseph-Armand Landry (14 December 1918 – 23 March 1985) was a Liberal party member of the House of Commons of Canada. He was an accountant, insurance broker and manager by career.

Landry attempted to win the Dorchester federal riding in the 1953 election but was unsuccessful. He won Dorchester in the 1957 election and served one term, the 23rd Canadian Parliament. He was defeated by Noël Drouin of the Progressive Conservative party in 1957. Landry made one further unsuccessful attempt at winning back Dorchester in 1958.
