= Alphonse-Arthur Miville Déchêne =

Canadian politician

The Hon. Alphonse Arthur Miville Déchêne
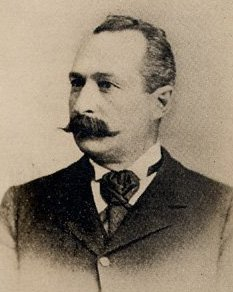

Senator for De la Durantaye, Quebec
- In office May 13, 1901 – May 1, 1902
- Appointed by: Wilfrid Laurier
- Preceded by: John Jones Ross
- Succeeded by: Jules Tessier

Member of the Canadian Parliament for L'Islet
- In office 1896–1901
- Preceded by: Joseph Israël Tarte
- Succeeded by: Onésiphore Carbonneau

Personal details
- Born: April 17, 1848 L'Islet, Canada East
- Died: May 1, 1902 (aged 54)
- Party: Liberal

Alphonse-Arthur Miville Déchêne (April 17, 1848 – May 1, 1902) was a Canadian lumber merchant and political figure in Quebec. He represented L'Islet in the House of Commons of Canada as a Liberal member from 1896 to 1901 and sat for De la Durantaye division in the Senate of Canada from 1901 to 1902.

He was born in L'Islet, Canada East, the son of Alfred Miville, dit Dechêne, and was educated at the Collège Sainte-Anne. In 1891, he married Aurore Ouillet. He served as mayor of Saint-Pamphile. Déchêne died in office at the age of 54.

His son Joseph Bruno Aimé Miville Déchêne also served in the House of Commons. His brother François-Gilbert Miville Dechêne represented L'Islet in the Legislative Assembly of Quebec.

1896 Canadian federal election: L'Islet
Party	Candidate	Votes
Liberal	Alphonse-Arthur Miville Déchêne	1,038
Conservative	A. Dionne	1,032

1900 Canadian federal election: L'Islet
Party	Candidate	Votes
Liberal	Alphonse-Arthur Miville Déchêne	1,111
Conservative	Jos. Ed. Caron	1,011
