= Joseph-Fernand Fafard =

Canadian politician

The Hon. J. Fernand Fafard

Senator for De la Durantaye, Quebec
- In office 29 January 1940 – 14 May 1955
- Appointed by: William Lyon Mackenzie King
- Preceded by: Émile Fortin
- Succeeded by: Jean-François Pouliot

Member of Parliament for L'Islet
- In office December 1917 – October 1935
- Preceded by: Eugène Paquet
- Succeeded by: riding dissolved

Member of Parliament for Montmagny—L'Islet
- In office December 1935 – January 1940
- Preceded by: riding created
- Succeeded by: Léo Kemner Laflamme

Personal details
- Born: 25 August 1882 L'Islet, Quebec
- Died: 14 May 1955 (aged 72) Quebec City, Quebec
- Party: Laurier Liberals; Liberal
- Spouse(s): 1) Héva Girard m. 5 February 1912 d. 1935; 2) A. Paquet
- Relations: Adine Fafard-Drolet (sister)
- Occupation: land surveyor

Joseph-Fernand Fafard (25 August 1882 – 14 May 1955) was a Laurier Liberal and a Liberal party member of the House of Commons of Canada. He was born in L'Islet, Quebec and became a land surveyor.

Fafard attended L'Islet College and Collège de Lévis. In 1901, he studied how to survey lands in Alberta and Saskatchewan for his probationary course and in 1905 earned his diploma. He was the first to conduct a land survey of the Abitibi region and also became vice-president of the Quebec Land Surveyors Association.

Fafard was first elected to Parliament under the Laurier Liberals party banner at the L'Islet riding in the 1917 general election. He was re-elected under the Liberal Party there in 1921, 1925, 1926 and 1930. With riding boundary changes, Fafard was re-elected for the Liberals in 1935 at the Montmagny—L'Islet riding.

In 1940, after completing his term in the 18th Canadian Parliament, Fafard was appointed to the Senate for the De la Durantaye, Quebec division. He continued in that role until his death on 14 May 1955 in Quebec City following an unidentified brief illness.

1917 Canadian federal election: L'Islet
Party	Candidate	Votes
Opposition (Laurier Liberals)	Joseph-Fernand Fafard	acclaimed

1921 Canadian federal election: L'Islet
Party	Candidate	Votes
Liberal	Joseph-Fernand Fafard	3,720
Conservative	Eugène Paquet	2,132

1925 Canadian federal election: L'Islet
Party	Candidate	Votes
Liberal	Joseph-Fernand Fafard	3,516
Conservative	Joseph-Adhémar Gagnon	2,436

1930 Canadian federal election: L'Islet
Party	Candidate	Votes
Liberal	Joseph-Fernand Fafard	3,558
Conservative	Louis-Joseph Gauthier	3,165
Source: lop.parl.ca
