= Cyrias Roy =

Canadian politician (1864–1919)

Georges-Cyrias Roy (August 6, 1864 – June 27, 1919) was a lawyer and political figure in Quebec. He represented Montmagny in the House of Commons of Canada from 1908 to 1911 as a Liberal.

He was born in St-François de la Rivière-du-Sud, the son of Georges Roy and Henriette Corriveau. Roy was admitted to the Quebec bar in 1887 and practised in Montmagny. In 1899, he was named prothonotary for Montmagny district, sharing this title with Amédée Beaubien until 1904; he resigned this position in 1908 to run for a seat in the House of Commons. In 1912, he became prothonotary again, this time with Cléophas Leclerc. Roy died in Montmagny at the age of 54.

Roy also served as mayor of Montmagny in 1896 and 1897.

== Electoral record ==
1908 Canadian federal election: Montmagny
Party	Candidate	Votes
Liberal	Cyrias Roy	1,388
Conservative	David Ovide L'Espérance	1,230
