= Lucien Dechene =

Canadian ice hockey player (born 1925)

- Born: August 17, 1925 Quebec City, Quebec, Canada
- Height: 5 ft 10 in (178 cm)
- Weight: 200 lb (91 kg; 14 st 4 lb)
- Position: Goaltender
- Shot: Left
- Played for: New Westminster Royals; Vancouver Canucks; Brandon Regals; Saskatoon Quakers; Calgary Stampeders; Quebec Aces
- Playing career: 1945–1961

Lucien Dechene (born August 17, 1925) is a Canadian retired professional hockey player who played 798 games in the Western Hockey League with the New Westminster Royals, Vancouver Canucks, Brandon Regals, Saskatoon Quakers, and Calgary Stampeders. He also played one season with the Quebec Aces in the American Hockey League. He was named the WHL's Outstanding Goaltender five times, and was twice awarded the league's George Leader Cup as its most outstanding player.
