= Joseph Alfred Ernest Roy =

Canadian politician

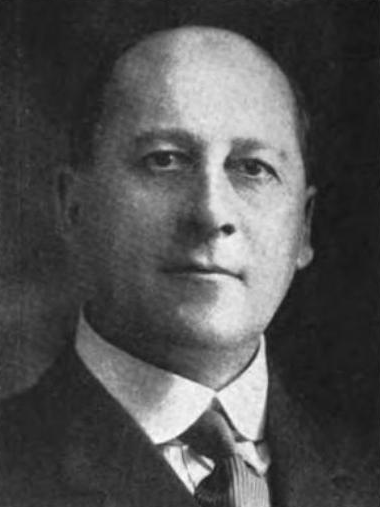

Member of the Canadian Parliament for Dorchester
- In office 1908–1911
- Preceded by: Jean-Baptiste Morin
- Succeeded by: Albert Sévigny

Member of the Legislative Assembly of Quebec for Montmagny
- In office 1900–1908
- Preceded by: Joseph-Couillard Lislois
- Succeeded by: Armand Lavergne

Personal details
- Born: October 3, 1871 Saint-Vallier, Quebec
- Died: August 17, 1928 (aged 56) Saint-Michel, Quebec
- Party: Liberal

Joseph Alfred Ernest Roy (October 3, 1871 – August 17, 1928) was a Quebec lawyer, journalist, judge and political figure. He represented Montmagny in the Legislative Assembly of Quebec from 1900 to 1908, and Dorchester in the House of Commons of Canada as a Liberal member from 1908 to 1911. His name also appears as Ernest Roy.

== Biography ==
Roy was born in Saint-Vallier, Quebec in 1871, the son of small landowner Nazaire Roy, and studied at the Séminaire de Québec and the Université Laval. He articled with Adélard Turgeon and also later served as his legal secretary. He was called to the bar in 1898 and set up practice at Quebec City, specializing in criminal law. In 1897, he had married Marie-Malvina Godbout. Roy was editor for the Courrier de Montmagny from 1900 to 1904. He was named King's Counsel in 1910. Roy was a member of the Quebec city council from 1914 to 1916. He served as whip for the federal Liberal party from 1909 to 1911. In 1924, he was named to the Quebec Superior Court.

He died at Saint-Michel in 1928.
