= 1891 Canadian federal election =

- March 5, 1891

215 seats in the House of Commons 108 seats needed for a majority
- Turnout: 64.4% (▼5.7 pp)

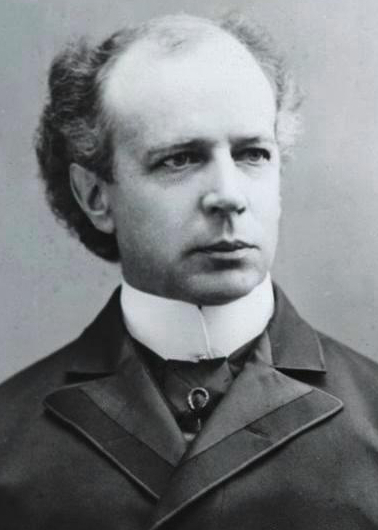
	First party	Second party
Leader	John A. Macdonald	Wilfrid Laurier
Party	Conservative	Liberal
Leader since	July 1, 1867	June 2, 1887
Leader's seat	Kingston	Quebec East (Note: Laurier also ran in Richmond—Wolfe, where he was defeated.)
Last election	122 seats, 47.4%	80 seats, 43.1%
Seats won	117	90
Seat change	▼5	▲10
Popular vote	376,518	350,512
Percentage	48.6% (Note: Popular vote is combination of Conservative and Liberal-Conservative tallies.)	45.2%
Swing	▲1.2 pp	▲2.1 pp
- 1891 Canadian electoral map

- The Canadian parliament after the 1891 election
Prime Minister before election
John A. Macdonald
Conservative
Prime Minister after election
John A. Macdonald
Conservative

The 1891 Canadian federal election was held on March 5, 1891, to elect members of the House of Commons of Canada of the 7th Parliament of Canada. It was won by the Conservative Party of Prime Minister Sir John A. Macdonald.

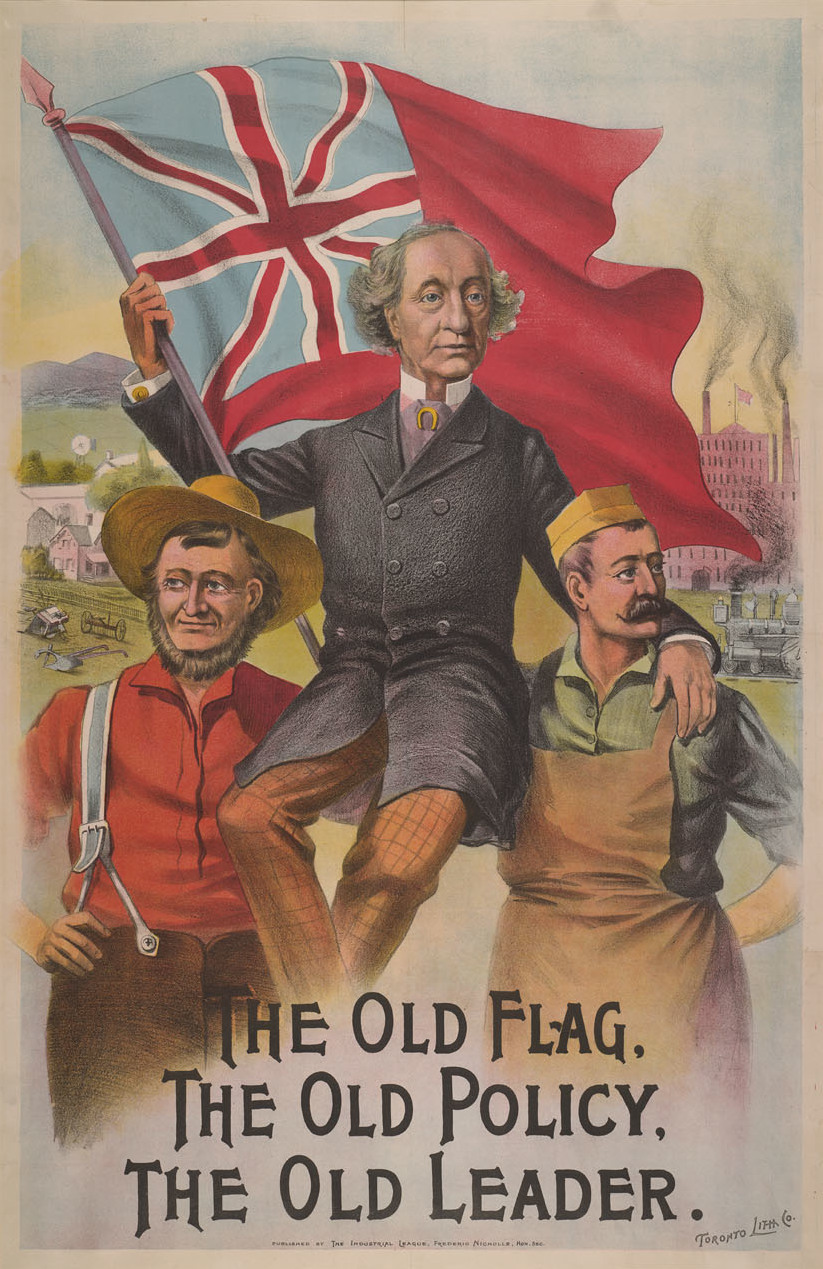
An election poster in support of the Conservative party from 1891.

The main issue of the 1891 campaign was Macdonald's National Policy, a policy of protective tariffs. The Liberals supported reciprocity (free trade) with the United States. Canadian voters would return to the issue of free trade 20 years later in the 1911 federal election.

Macdonald led a Conservative campaign emphasizing stability, and retained the Conservatives' majority in the House of Commons. It was a close election and he campaigned hard. Macdonald died a few months after the election, which led to his succession by four different Conservative Prime Ministers until the 1896 election.

It was Wilfrid Laurier's first election as leader of the Liberals. Although he lost the election, he increased the Liberals' support. He returned in 1896 to win a solid majority, despite losing the popular vote.

The Nationalist Party won a seat in Quebec. Dorchester riding elected Cyrille-Émile Vaillancourt.

== National results ==

Party	Party leader	# of candidates	Seats			Popular vote		
Party	Party leader	# of candidates	1887	Elected	Change	#	%	Change
Conservative	John A. Macdonald	187	87	97	+11.5%	332,961	42.96%	+2.80pp
Liberal-Conservative	John A. Macdonald	25	24	20	-16.7%	43,557	5.62%	-1.64pp
Liberal	Wilfrid Laurier	194	79	90	+13.9%	350,512	45.22%	+2.09pp
Independent Conservative		4	3	3	-	15,045	1.94%	+0.38pp
Independent		4	3	2	-66.7%	6,357	0.82%	-0.42pp
Nationalist		1	1	1	-	-^{1}	0.00%	-0.66pp
Independent Liberal		2	5	1	-80%	5,573	0.72%	-1.45pp
Nationalist Conservative		1	2	1	-50%	1,271	0.16%	-0.32pp
Unknown		14	1	-	-100%	16,890	2.18%	-1.15pp
Equal Rights		2	*	-	*	2,455	0.32%	*
Progressive		2	*	-	*	468	0.06%	*
Total		436	205	215	+4.9%	775,089	100%	
Sources: http://www.elections.ca -- History of Federal Ridings since 1867

Notes:

* Party did not nominate candidates in the previous election.

^{1} One Nationalist candidate was elected by acclamation.

Acclamations:

The following Members of Parliament were elected by acclamation;

- British Columbia: 1 Conservative, 1 Liberal-Conservative
- Manitoba: 1 Conservative
- Ontario: 1 Conservative
- Quebec: 1 Conservative, 2 Liberal, 1 Nationalist

== Results by province ==
Party name		BC	NWT	MB	ON	QC	NB	NS	PE	Total
Conservative	Seats:	5	4	1	39	24	10	12	2	97
Conservative	Popular vote (%):	71.6	81.0	12.6	42.2	45.4	48.9	41.9	48.5	43.0
Liberal-Conservative	Seats:	1		3	7	3	2	4		20
Liberal-Conservative	Vote (%):			40.5	5.3	3.0	3.7	10.8		5.6
Liberal	Seats:	-	-	1	44	33	4	5	3	90
Liberal	Vote (%):	28.4	19.0	46.9	49.1	45.9	41.3	43.6	41.0	45.2
Independent Conservative	Seats:				1	2				3
Independent Conservative	Vote (%):				1.3	5.9				1.9
Independent	Seats:				1	1	-			2
Independent	Vote (%):				0.7	1.2	3.2			0.8
Nationalist	Seats:					1				1
Nationalist	Vote (%):					-				-
Independent Liberal	Seats:						-		1	1
Independent Liberal	Vote (%):						2.9		10.5	0.7
Nationalist Conservative	Seats:					1				1
Nationalist Conservative	Vote (%):					0.7				0.2
Total seats		6	4	5	92	65	16	21	6	215
Parties that won no seats:
Unknown	Vote (%):				2.0	3.8		3.1		2.2
Equal Rights	Vote (%):				0.7					0.3
Progressive	Vote (%):							0.5		0.1

== See also ==
- List of Canadian federal general elections
- List of political parties in Canada
- 7th Canadian Parliament
