= Le Nationaliste =

- Founder(s): Olivar Asselin, Henri Bourassa, and others
- Founded: 1904
- Ceased publication: 1922
- Political alignment: Ligue nationaliste
- Language: French

Le Nationaliste was a weekly newspaper (published on Sundays) and an organ of the Ligue nationaliste, an anti-imperialist and nationalist movement in Quebec, Canada.

The paper was founded by journalist Olivar Asselin, journalist and politician Henri Bourassa and others. Although Bourassa owned shares in the newspaper, he refrained from becoming active in its administration and, fearing his byline would imply his tacit approval of all its positions, quickly stopped contributing articles to it. The first issue was published on March 6, 1904, and Asselin assumed the presidency of the newspaper until 1908. It was an important part of the political debates in Quebec until the foundation in 1910 of Bourassa's Le Devoir newspaper, to which Asselin contributed for two months before tendering his resignation. In September 1922, Le Nationaliste merged with Le Devoir to become the later's Saturday edition, titled Le Nationaliste et le Devoir.

== See also ==
- List of Quebec historical newspapers
- List of Quebec media
- Quebec nationalism
- History of Quebec
- List of newspapers in Canada
