= L'Islet (federal electoral district) =

Former federal electoral district in Quebec, Canada

Coordinates: 47°5′0″N 70°19′30″W

Quebec electoral district

Defunct federal electoral district
- Legislature: House of Commons
- District created: 1867
- District abolished: 1933
- First contested: 1867
- Last contested: 1930

L'Islet (French pronunciation: [lilɛ]) was a federal electoral district in Quebec, Canada, that was represented in the House of Commons of Canada from 1867 to 1935.

It was created by the British North America Act, 1867 and consisted of the County of L'Islet. It was amalgamated into the Kamouraska and Montmagny—L'Islet electoral districts in 1933.

== Members of Parliament ==
This riding elected the following members of Parliament:

Parliament	Years	Member	Party
L'Islet
1st	1867–1869	Barthélemy Pouliot	Conservative
1st	1869–1872	Barthélemy Pouliot	Conservative
2nd	1872–1874	Philippe Baby Casgrain	Liberal
3rd	1874–1878	Philippe Baby Casgrain	Liberal
4th	1878–1882	Philippe Baby Casgrain	Liberal
5th	1882–1887	Philippe Baby Casgrain	Liberal
6th	1887–1891	Philippe Baby Casgrain	Liberal
7th	1891–1892	Louis-Georges Desjardins	Conservative
7th	1893–1896	Joseph-Israël Tarte	Independent
8th	1896–1900	Alphonse-Arthur Miville Déchêne	Liberal
9th	1900–1901	Alphonse-Arthur Miville Déchêne	Liberal
9th	1902–1904	Onésiphore Carbonneau	Liberal
10th	1904–1908	Eugène Paquet	Conservative
11th	1908–1911	Eugène Paquet	Conservative
12th	1911–1917	Eugène Paquet	Conservative
13th	1917–1921	Joseph-Fernand Fafard	Opposition (Laurier Liberals)
14th	1921–1925	Joseph-Fernand Fafard	Liberal
15th	1925–1926	Joseph-Fernand Fafard	Liberal
16th	1926–1930	Joseph-Fernand Fafard	Liberal
17th	1930–1935	Joseph-Fernand Fafard	Liberal
Riding dissolved into Kamouraska and Montmagny—L'Islet

== Election results ==
1867 Canadian federal election
Party	Candidate	Votes	Elected
Conservative	Barthélemy Pouliot	464	✓
Unknown	Louis-Bonaventure Caron	40	
Source: Canadian Elections Database

By-election: On Mr. Pouliot being unseated on petition

By-election on 14 July 1869
Party	Candidate	Votes
Conservative	Barthélemy Pouliot	697
Unknown	Louis-Bonaventure Caron	460

1872 Canadian federal election
Party	Candidate	Votes
Liberal	Philippe Baby Casgrain	646
Conservative	Barthélemy Pouliot	599
Source: Canadian Elections Database

By-election: On Mr. Desjardin's resignation, 30 September 1892

By-election on 5 January 1893
Party	Candidate	Votes
Independent	Joseph-Israël Tarte	acclaimed

1896 Canadian federal election
Party	Candidate	Votes
Liberal	Alphonse-Arthur Miville Déchêne	1,038
Conservative	A. Dionne	1,032

1900 Canadian federal election
Party	Candidate	Votes
Liberal	Alphonse-Arthur Miville Déchêne	1,111
Conservative	Jos. Ed. Caron	1,011

By-election: On Mr. Déchêne being called to the Senate, 13 May 1901

By-election on 15 January 1902
Party	Candidate	Votes
Liberal	Onésiphore Carbonneau	953
Conservative	Jos. Ed. Caron	932

1904 Canadian federal election
Party	Candidate	Votes
Conservative	Eugène Paquet	1,195
Liberal	Onésiphore Carbonneau	1,038

1908 Canadian federal election
Party	Candidate	Votes
Conservative	Eugène Paquet	1,349
Liberal	Jean-Baptiste-Thomas Caron	1,184

1911 Canadian federal election
Party	Candidate	Votes
Conservative	Eugène Paquet	1,578
Liberal	Armand Bourgault	1,144

1917 Canadian federal election
Party	Candidate	Votes
Opposition (Laurier Liberals)	Joseph-Fernand Fafard	acclaimed

1921 Canadian federal election
Party	Candidate	Votes
Liberal	Joseph-Fernand Fafard	3,720
Conservative	Eugène Paquet	2,132

1925 Canadian federal election
Party	Candidate	Votes
Liberal	Joseph-Fernand Fafard	3,516
Conservative	Joseph-Adhémar Gagnon	2,436

1926 Canadian federal election
Party	Candidate	Votes
Liberal	Joseph-Fernand Fafard	3,619
Conservative	Joseph-Adhémar Gagnon	2,795

== See also ==
- List of Canadian electoral districts
- Historical federal electoral districts of Canada
