= Olivar Asselin =

Canadian writer and journalist (1874–1937)

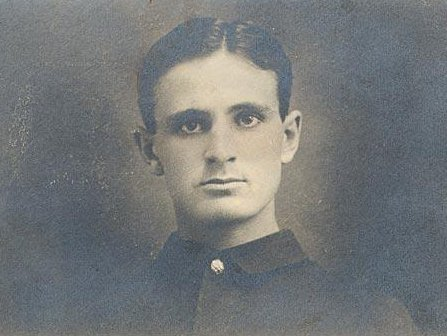
- Asselin in 1899
- Born: November 8, 1874; Saint-Hilarion, Quebec
- Died: April 18, 1937 (aged 62); Montreal, Quebec
- Resting place: Notre Dame des Neiges Cemetery
- Occupations: journalist, editor, author, civil servant, military officer, courtier, newspaper owner

Olivar Asselin (November 8, 1874 – April 18, 1937) was a writer and journalist in Quebec, Canada. He was a prominent nationalist, pamphleteer, and polemist.

== Biography ==
Asselin was born in Saint-Hilarion, Charlevoix, Quebec. His name is a combination of the French first name "Olivier" and the last name of the Latin American independence leader Simón Bolívar.

He did his primary education in a school in Sainte-Flavie, near Rimouski, and his secondary education at the Séminaire de Rimouski.

For financial reasons, his family emigrated to the United States in 1891. After a while working at the cotton mills there, he worked for numerous newspapers in what was then called the "French Canadian" community. He was first journalist for Le Protecteur Canadien of Fall River, in 1894. A year later, he was editor of Le National of Lowell, Massachusetts (notorious as an emigration target for Quebecers of the day) and Le Jean-Baptiste of Pawtucket, Rhode Island. From 1896 to 1898, he was editorial secretary at La Tribune of Woonsocket.

He volunteered late enough in 1898 during the Spanish–American War not to be deployed to a combat zone. Then, he was demobilized in 1899, when he moved to Montreal and contributed to various papers, including Les Débats.

On August 3, 1902, he married Alice Le Bouthillier.

From 1901 to 1903, he was secretary to Minister of Colonization Lomer Gouin. He stood as a nationalist candidate in Terrebonne during the 1904 election and then in Saint-James during the 1911 election.

In 1907, after a session of the Legislative Assembly of Quebec had ended, he came down from the press gallery to confront Louis-Alexandre Taschereau, Minister of The Public Works, and future Premier of Quebec, on the Assembly floor. He was upset over an allegation that the minister supposedly made about him during the session, which implicated him in an affair over a false telegram. Asselin told him it was false, but Taschereau refused to admit that he had made such an allegation. Asselin slapped him in the face, earning him a stay in jail. The imprisonment was notably criticized by Henri Bourassa.

From 1902 to 1910, he worked closely with Bourassa and collaborated with him in the founding of Le Devoir in 1910. He was President of the Saint-Jean-Baptiste Society of Montreal from 1913 to 1914. A nationalist militant, he set up the Ligue nationaliste in March 1903 and launched the newspaper Le Nationaliste a year later. It is during that time that he defended the settlers' right to cut trees and provided information to the Colonization Commission in 1904. In 1905, he began a campaign in favour of public compulsory education, which would become law only under Premier Adélard Godbout in the 1940s.

The November 26, 1915, Sir Sam Hughes, Minister of Militia and Defence, offered Asselin the honorary rank of colonel, which entailed raising a battalion for the Canadian Expeditionary Force. Asselin recruited men to form the 163rd (Canadien-Francais) Battalion, CEF, known as the "Poils-aux-pattes," made up of French-Canadian volunteers, and placed them under the command of Captain Henri Desrosiers, accepting instead the rank of Major.

After training in Bermuda, the 163rd Battalion made its way to England, disembarking in December 1916, where the battalion was quickly dismantled and used to reinforce other depleted sections. Transferred to the 22nd Battalion, CEF, Asselin participated in the Battle of Vimy Ridge and the Battle of Acheville. However, he was later removed from the front after contracting trench fever. From 25 October 1918 to the rest of the war, Major Asselin was posted to the 87th Battalion (Canadian Grenadier Guards). On 3 January 1919 he was assigned special duty with The Prime minister of Canada's Office.

Alternately speaker and military attaché, Asselin found himself as a member of the Canadian Delegation at the Paris Peace Conference of 1918, which led to the Treaty of Versailles and the conclusion of World War I.

Asselin received the Légion d'honneur from France in 1920.

In 1930, he became the editor-in-chief of Le Canada and founded, five years later, his own newspapers, L'Ordre and La Renaissance.

Asselin died in 1937 in Montreal at the age of 62. He was entombed at the Notre Dame des Neiges Cemetery in Montreal.

== See also ==
- List of presidents of the Saint-Jean-Baptiste Society of Montreal
- Quebec nationalism

== Related reading ==
- Hélène Pelletier-Baillargeon. "Asselin, Olivar", in Dictionary of Canadian Biography Online, University of Toronto and Université Laval, 2000
- Olivar Asselin, A Quebec view of Canadian nationalism: an essay by a dyed-in-the-wool French-Canadian on the best means of ensuring the greatness of the Canadian fatherland, 1909, 23,4 x 15,6 x 0,5 cm — Reprints from the collection of the University of Michigan Library: Book on Demand

In French

- Olivar Asselin, Liberté de pensée (préf. Robert Lahaise), Montréal: Typo, 1997, 160 p; ISBN 978-2-8929-5136-3
- Claude-Henri Grignon, Olivar Asselin, le pamphlétaire maudit (dir. Pierre Grignon; préf. Victor-Lévy Beaulieu), Trois-Pistoles: Éditions Trois-Pistoles, 2007, 342 p; ISBN 978-2-8958-3166-2
- Hélène Pelletier-Baillargeon, Olivar Asselin et son temps,
  - [Vol 1] Le militant, Montréal: Fides, 1996, 780 p (with an index); ISBN 978-2-7621-1889-6
  - [Vol 2] Le volontaire, Montréal: Fides, 2001, 328 p (with an index); ISBN 978-2-7621-2129-2
  - [Vol 3] Le maître, Montréal: Fides, 2010, 416 p (with an index); ISBN 978-2-7621-3026-3
- Denis Labarre, Olivar Asselin, Montréal: Lidec, collection « Célébrités canadiennes », 1991, 53 p, 22 cm; ISBN 2-7608-7028-6
- Marcel-Aimé Gagnon,
  - [Vol 1] La vie orageuse d'Olivar Asselin, Montréal: Les Éditions de l'Homme, 1962, 302 p
  - [Vol 2] La vie orageuse d'Olivar Asselin: 1914–1937 (préf. Lionel Groulx), Montréal: Les Éditions de l'Homme, 1962
- Marcel-Aimé Gagnon, Olivar Asselin toujours vivant (préf. Willie Chevalier), Montréal: Presses de l'Université du Québec, 1974, 215 p; ISBN 0-7770-0114-4
- Hermas Bastien, Olivar Asselin, Montréal: B. Valiquette, 1938, 220 p
- Joseph Gauvreau, Olivar Asselin, précurseur d'Action française, le plus grand de nos journalistes, 1875–1937, s.n., 1937, 46 p
