= Aimé-Miville Déchêne =

Canadian politician

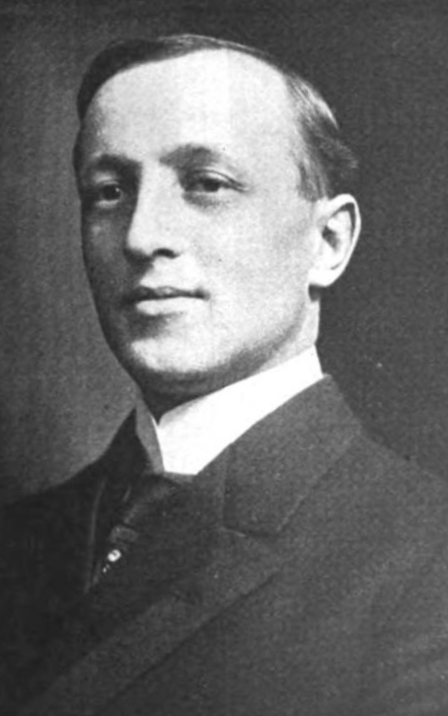

Member of the House of Commons of Canada
- In office 1917–1925
- Constituency: Montmagny

Personal details
- Born: Joseph Bruno Aimé Miville Déchêne; November 8, 1881; Sainte-Louise, Quebec
- Died: January 18, 1944 (aged 62); Quebec City, Quebec
- Political party: Liberal
- Spouse: Bernadette Bernier
- Education: Séminaire de Québec; Université Laval
- Occupation: Lawyer, politician

Joseph Bruno Aimé Miville Déchêne, KC (November 8, 1881 – January 18, 1944) was a lawyer and political figure in Quebec. He represented Montmagny in the House of Commons of Canada from 1917 to 1925 as a Liberal.

== Biography ==
He was born in Sainte-Louise, Quebec on November 8, 1881, the son of Alphonse Arthur Miville Déchêne and Aurore Ouellet. He was educated at the Séminaire de Québec and the Université Laval. Déchêne married Bernadette Bernier. He was called to the Quebec bar in 1906. In 1918, he was named King's Counsel. Déchêne was seigneur of Sainte-Anne de la Pocatière. He served as crown prosecutor for Montmagny district. In 1935, he was named Director of the Parliamentary Post Office. He died in Quebec City at the age of 62.

His uncle François-Gilbert Miville Dechêne served in the Quebec assembly.

== Electoral record ==
1917 Canadian federal election: Montmagny
Party	Candidate	Votes
Opposition (Laurier Liberals)	Aimé-Miville Déchêne	2,394
Independent	Armand Lavergne	1,343
Government (Unionist)	Joseph-George Blais	36

1921 Canadian federal election: Montmagny
Party	Candidate	Votes
Liberal	Aimé-Miville Déchêne	5,103
Independent	Télesphore Coulombe	1,332
