= Cyrille Émile Vaillancourt =

Canadian politician

Cyrille-Émile Vaillancourt (March 20, 1848 – June 7, 1912) was a physician and political figure in Quebec. He represented Dorchester in the House of Commons of Canada from 1891 to 1896 as a Nationalist member.

He was born in Saint-Roch, Canada East. In 1872, he married Marie-Louise Larochelle. He set up practice at Saint-Anselme in 1873 and later served as mayor and then registrar for Dorchester County. Vaillancourt ran unsuccessfully for reelection to the House of Commons in 1896 and 1904.

His son Cyrille later served in the Canadian senate.
