= List of members of the Legislative Council of Quebec =

The Legislative Council of Quebec was the unelected upper house of the Quebec legislature. It was abolished effective December 31, 1968.

The Council was composed of 24 members, appointed by the Lieutenant Governor upon recommendation of the Premier. Each councillor nominally represented a portion of the Province of Quebec called a division. Members were appointed for life; in 1963 the rule was changed to retire members at age 75, but this did not apply to already-appointed members, and in the event remained entirely theoretical since the Council was abolished before it could be applied to anyone.

During its existence, all members of the Legislative Council belonged to either the Quebec Liberal Party, the Conservative Party of Quebec, or the Union Nationale.

When it was dissolved the standings were: Union Nationale – 15, Liberal – 9.

== Members ==
=== Alma ===
- Jean-Louis Beaudry 1867–1886 Conservative
- Sévère Rivard 1886–1888 Conservative
- Louis Tourville 1888–1896 Liberal
- Trefflé Berthiaume 1896–1915 Conservative
- Médéric Martin 1919–1946 Liberal
- Joseph-Olier Renaud 1946–1968 Union Nationale

=== Bedford ===
- Thomas Wood 1867–1898 Conservative
- John Charles James Sarsfield McCorkill 1898–1903 Liberal
- Ernest de Varennes 1904–1919 Liberal
- Joseph-Jean-Baptiste Gosselin 1919–1929 Liberal
- Jacob Nicol 1929–1958 Liberal
- Joseph-Oscar Gilbert 1960–1968 Union Nationale

=== De la Durantaye ===
- Joseph-Octave Beaubien 1867–1877 Conservative
- Édouard Rémillard 1878–1887 Liberal
- Pierre Garneau 1887–1904 Liberal
- Édouard Burroughs Garneau 1904–1911 Liberal
- Georges-Élie Amyot 1912–1930 Liberal
- Alfred-Valère Roy 1930–1942 Liberal
- Cyrille Vaillancourt 1943–1944 Liberal
- Charles Delagrave 1944–1952 Liberal
- Joseph Boulanger 1952–1963 Union Nationale
- George O'Reilly 1964–1968 Liberal

=== De Lanaudière ===
- Pierre-Eustache Dostaler 1867–1884 Conservative
- Louis-François-Rodrigue Masson 1884 Conservative
- Vincent-Paul Lavallée 1885–1888 Conservative
- Louis Sylvestre 1890–1905 Liberal
- Jules Allard 1905–1910 Liberal
- Louis-Philippe Bérard 1912–1914 Liberal
- Jules Allard 1916–1919 Liberal
- Clément Robillard 1919–1926 Liberal
- Gaspard De Serres 1928 Liberal
- Joseph-Ferdinand Daniel 1929–1940 Liberal
- Félix Messier 1942–1968 Liberal

=== De la Vallière ===
- Jean-Baptiste-Georges Proulx 1867–1884 Liberal
- François-Xavier-Ovide Méthot 1884–1908 Conservative
- Adélard Turgeon 1909–1930 Liberal
- Joseph-Charles-Ernest Ouellet 1930–1952 Liberal
- Patrice Tardif 1952–1968 Union Nationale

=== De Lorimier ===
- Charles-Séraphin Rodier 1867–1876 Conservative
- Joseph-Gaspard Laviolette 1876–1897 Conservative
- Jean Girouard 1897–1936 Conservative
- Alphonse Raymond 1936–1958 Union Nationale
- John Pozer Rowat 1958–1968 Union Nationale

=== De Salaberry ===
- Henry Starnes 1867–1896 Conservative
- Jean-Damien Rolland 1896–1912 Conservative
- Achille Bergevin 1913–1914 Liberal
- Alphonse Racine 1915–1918 Liberal
- Lomer Gouin 1920–1921 Liberal
- Raoul-Ovide Grothé 1927–1968 Liberal

=== Grandville ===
- Élisée Dionne 1867–1892 Conservative
- Thomas-Philippe Pelletier 1892–1913 Conservative
- John Hall Kelly 1914–1939 Liberal
- François-Philippe Brais 1940–1968 Liberal

=== Gulf ===
- John Le Boutillier 1867–1872 Conservative
- Thomas Savage 1873–1887 Conservative
- David Alexander Ross 1887–1897 Liberal
- Richard Turner 1897–1917 Liberal
- Frank Carrel 1918–1940 Liberal
- Jules-André Brillant 1942–1968 Liberal

=== Inkerman ===
- George Bryson 1867–1887 Conservative
- George Bryson 1887–1937 Liberal
- Charles Allan Smart 1937 Conservative
- Martin Beattie Fisher 1939–1941 Union Nationale
- Robert R. Ness 1942–1960 Liberal
- George Carlyle Marler 1960–1968 Liberal

=== Kennebec ===
- Isidore Thibaudeau 1867–1874 Liberal
- Louis Richard 1874–1876 Conservative
- Joseph Gaudet 1877–1882 Conservative
- Elzéar Gérin 1882–1887 Conservative
- Édouard-Louis Pacaud 1887–1889 Liberal
- Napoléon-Charles Cormier 1889–1915 Liberal
- François-Théodore Savoie 1915–1921 Liberal
- Paul Tourigny 1921–1926 Liberal
- Joseph-Édouard Caron 1927–1929 Liberal
- Élisée Thériault 1929–1958 Liberal
- Ernest Benoît 1959–1968 Union Nationale

=== La Salle ===
- Louis Panet 1867–1884 Conservative
- Praxède Larue 1885–1896 Conservative
- Vildebon-Winceslas Larue 1896–1906 Conservative
- Charles-Eugène Dubord 1907–1917 Liberal
- Philippe-Jacques Paradis 1917–1927 Liberal
- Louis Alfred Letourneau 1927–1938 Liberal
- Jean Mercier 1939 Union Nationale
- Pierre Bertrand 1939–1948 Union Nationale
- Joseph-Théophile Larochelle 1948–1954 Union Nationale
- Alfred-Albert Bouchard 1954–1968 Union Nationale

=== Lauzon ===
- Alexandre-René Chaussegros de Léry 1867–1880 Conservative
- George Couture 1881–1887 Conservative
- Louis-Philippe Pelletier 1888 Conservative
- Louis-Napoléon Larochelle 1888–1890 Conservative
- Nicodème Audet 1892–1905 Conservative
- Blaise-Ferdinand Letellier 1905–1910 Liberal
- Eugène Roberge 1912–1935 Liberal
- Émile Moreau 1935–1959 Liberal
- Gérald Martineau 1959–1968 Union Nationale

=== Mille-Isles ===
- Félix-Hyacinthe Lemaire 1867–1879 Conservative
- Jean-Baptiste Lefebvre de Villemure 1880–1882 Conservative
- Alexandre Lacoste 1882–1883 Conservative
- Charles Champagne 1883–1888 Conservative
- David Marsil 1888–1899 Liberal
- François-Xavier Mathieu 1900–1908 Liberal
- Hector Champagne 1908–1941 Liberal
- Francis Lawrence Connors 1942–1964 Liberal
- Lionel Bertrand 1964–1968 Liberal

=== Montarville ===
- Charles-Eugène Boucher de Boucherville 1867–1915 Conservative
- Joseph-Léonide Perron 1916–1929 Liberal
- Narcisse Pérodeau 1929–1932 Liberal
- Gustave Lemieux 1932–1956 Liberal
- Émile Lesage 1956–1963 Union Nationale
- Arthur Dupré 1963–1968 Liberal

=== Repentigny ===
- Louis Archambeault 1867–1888 Conservative
- Horace Archambeault 1888–1908 Liberal
- Achille Bergevin 1910–1913 Liberal
- Georges-Aimé Simard 1913–1921 Liberal
- Georges-Aimé Simard 1923–1953 Liberal
- Édouard Masson 1953–1967 Union Nationale
- Marcel Faribault 1967–1968 Union Nationale

=== Rigaud ===
- Eustache Prud'homme 1867–1888 Conservative
- Wilfrid Prévost 1888–1898 Liberal
- Joseph Lanctôt 1898–1914 Liberal
- Joseph-Adolphe Chauret 1915–1918 Liberal
- Séverin Létourneau 1919–1922 Liberal
- Édouard Ouellette 1923–1931 Liberal
- Victor Marchand 1932–1960 Liberal
- Jean Raymond 1960–1968 Union Nationale

=== Rougemont ===
- John Fraser de Berry 1867–1876 Conservative
- Pierre Boucher de la Bruère 1877–1895 Conservative
- Gédéon Ouimet 1895–1905 Conservative
- François Gosselin 1906–1909 Liberal
- Ernest Choquette 1910–1941 Liberal
- Wilfrid Bovey 1942–1956 Liberal
- Joseph-Henri-Albiny Paquette 1958–1967 Union Nationale
- Jean-Guy Cardinal 1967–1968 Union Nationale

=== Shawinigan ===
- John Jones Ross 1867–1901 Conservative
- Némèse Garneau 1901–1937 Liberal
- Jean-Louis Baribeau 1938–1968 Union Nationale

=== Stadacona ===
- Thomas McGreevy 1867–1874 Conservative
- John Sharples, Sr. 1874–1876 Conservative
- John Hearn 1877–1892 Conservative
- John Roche 1892–1893 Conservative
- John Sharples, Jr. 1893–1913 Conservative
- John Charles Kaine 1915–1923 Liberal
- William Gerard Power 1923–1934 Liberal
- Hector Laferté 1934–1968 Liberal

=== Saurel ===
- David Morrison Armstrong 1867–1873 Conservative
- Pierre-Euclide Roy 1873–1882 Conservative
- Joseph-Adolphe Dorion 1882–1897 Conservative
- Narcisse Pérodeau 1897–1924 Liberal
- Pamphile-Réal Du Tremblay 1925–1955 Liberal
- Jean Barrette 1955–1968 Union Nationale

=== The Laurentides ===
- Jean-Élie Gingras 1867–1887 Conservative
- Guillaume Bresse 1887–1892 Liberal
- Thomas Chapais 1892–1946 Conservative
- Gérald Martineau 1946–1959 Union Nationale
- Antonio Auger 1959–1968 Union Nationale

=== Victoria ===
- James Ferrier 1867–1888 Conservative
- Hugh Mackay 1888 Liberal
- James Kewley Ward 1888–1910 Liberal
- George Robert Smith 1911–1922 Liberal
- Henry Miles 1923–1932 Liberal
- Gordon Wallace Scott 1932–1940 Liberal
- George Gordon Hyde 1942–1946 Liberal
- George Buchanan Foster 1946–1968 Union Nationale

=== Wellington ===
- Edward Hale 1867–1875 Conservative
- William Hoste Webb 1875–1887 Conservative
- Francis Edward Gilman 1887–1917 Liberal
- William Frederick Vilas 1917–1930 Liberal
- Gordon Wallace Scott 1930–1931 Liberal
- William Stephen Bullock 1931–1936 Liberal
- Louis-Arthur Giroux 1937–1945 Union Nationale
- Édouard Asselin 1946–1968 Union Nationale
