= Chaussegros de Léry =

Chaussegros de Léry may refer to:

== People ==
- Alexandre-René Chaussegros de Léry, Canadian seigneur and politician (1818-1880)
- Charles-Étienne Chaussegros de Léry, Canadian politician (1774-1842)
- François Joseph d'Estienne de Chaussegros de Léry, French brigadier general (1754-1824).
- Gaspard-Joseph Chaussegros de Léry, Canadian politician (1721-1797).
- Gaspard-Joseph Chaussegros de Léry (military engineer), French military engineer (1682-1756).
- Louis-René Chaussegros de Léry, Canadian seigneur and politician (1762-1832)

== Geography ==
- Édifice Chaussegros-de-Léry, Montreal, Quebec, Canada
