= Chapais =

Chapais can refer to:

- Jean-Charles Chapais (1811–1885), a Canadian Conservative politician, and considered a Father of Canadian Confederation
- Thomas Chapais (1858–1946), a French Canadian author, editor, historian, journalist, professor, and politician
- Chapais, Quebec, a municipality in Canada
- Chapais (crater), a crater on Mars
