= Armand Joseph =

Armand Joseph may refer to:

- Armand Joseph (1788–?), Franciscan friar and producer of the earliest known dot distribution map
- Armand Louis Joseph de Fitte de Soucy (1796–1862), French general and governor of Martinique
- Armand Joseph Dubernad, (1741–1799), French merchant
- Armand Joseph Bruat (1796–1855), French admiral
- Armand-Joseph Guffroy (1742–1801), French lawyer and revolutionary
- Armand Joseph Overnay (1798–1869), French Chansoinner
- Armand Joseph Jurion or "Jef" (born 1937), Belgian footballer

== See also ==
- Joseph Armand (1820–1903), Canadian politician
- Joseph-Armand Nadeau (1928–1963), Canadian politician
