= Georges-Élie Amyot =

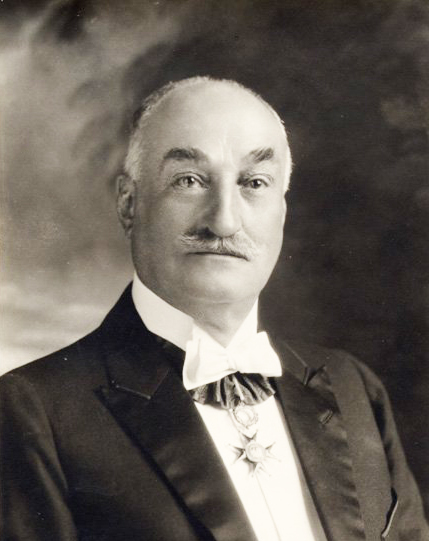

Member of the Legislative Council of Quebec for de La Durantaye
- In office 1912–1930
- Preceded by: Édouard Burroughs Garneau
- Succeeded by: Alfred-Valère Roy
- Parliamentary group: Liberal

Personal details
- Born: January 28, 1856 Saint-Augustin-de-Desmaures, Canada East
- Died: March 28, 1930 (aged 74) Palm Beach, Florida, United States
- Resting place: Notre-Dame de Belmont cemetery

Georges-Élie Amyot (January 28, 1856 – March 28, 1930) was a French Canadian businessman and politician, and founder of Dominion Corset. He was worth $8 million in 1930, at the time of his death.

== Early life ==
Amyot was born on January 28, 1856, to parents Dominique Amyotin and Louise Nolin in Saint-Augustin-de-Desmaures, where he lived and worked on a farm until he was 10 years old. In 1866, his family moved to Sainte-Catherine, where he would live and attend school (being taught English by Irish priests) until he was 14 years of age. In 1870, Amyot moved to Quebec City and was apprenticed to a saddler, Louis Girard. Eventually, Amyot joined into a partnership with Louis Tanguay. In 1874, Amyot moved to New Haven, Connecticut, to live with his brother, Bernard, subsequently moving to Springfield, Massachusetts, in search of better business opportunities. Three years later, in 1877, Amyot returned to Quebec, and in Montreal was employed as a clerk in wrought iron and boot/shoe businesses. After two years in Montreal, Amyot moved back to Quebec City and was employed by his cousins Joseph and George-Élie Amyot, who were in the business of importing novelty goods. Amyot founded his own store in 1885, but was quickly bankrupted, in large part through the work of Isidore Thibaudeau. Amyot would eventually pay back his creditors in 1894.

== Dominion Corset ==
In mid October 1886, Léon Dyonnet and Amyot went into the corset making business, under the name Dyonnet et Amyot (Léon's wife, Hélène Goullioud ran a corset factory). The agreement stipulated that "Each contributed $2,000 in capital, was entitled to half the profits, and could withdraw $800 a year for his personal expenses" and Dyonnet was to teach Amyot "all the manufacturing details and secrets and let him benefit from the experience he had gained in the said production process.” In 1888, the company employed about 60 people. One year later, in late March 1889, Dyonnet left for Brazil, and Amyot renamed the company Dominion Corset. Amyot would become the sole owner of Dominion in 1897, after two of his sisters (Odile and Mary-Louise) joined but subsequently left the company. The company grew rapidly, with sales more than quintupling over an eight-year period (from $21,000 in 1887 to $58,000 in 1891 and $130,000 in 1895.) Dominion Corset expanded in the Saint-Roch ward, eventually buying the factory of Guillaume Bresse. Amyot began to expand into other related industries, starting a paper box company in 1904, and a steel rod company in 1916. In 1910, the company had a value of $500,000. However, the factory was destroyed by a fire in 1911, leading to losses of 250,000. Amyot rebuilt, and sales soared to 1.6 million in 1918, and 2.6 million in 1919. In 1924, Amyot handed over his company to his son, Adjutor.

== Other business activities ==
In 1895, Amyot opened a brewery, presumably to ensure his financial well-being in the event Dominion Corset failed. Along with a partner, Pierre-Joseph Côté, the brewery was founded in the Saint-Sauveur ward. Eventually, Côté left, and was replaced by Michel Gauvin. The company (then known as Amyot et Gauvin) "produced and distributed Fox Head beers, both ale and porter." In 1909, Amyot was the sole owner of the company, and he sold it to National Breweries Limited for $226,500. He invested large amounts of money in real estate, as well as buying 700,000 dollars of Victory Loan subscriptions. Amyot also invested "in numerous railway, shipping, and mining companies."

== Politics ==
In 1887, Amyot did his first work in politics, as a Liberal Party organizer and fundraiser. He was active in the debate over Canadian–American Reciprocity, as well as being a member of the Canadian Manufactures Association, and president of the Quebec Chamber of Commerce in 1906 and 1907. When a by-election was called to fill the seat vacated by Charles Fitzpatrick, Amyot was the nominee, however he was defeated. In 1911, Lomer Gouin appointed Amyot legislative councillor for La Durantaye. In 1922, he was chosen to save the Banque Nationale from bankruptcy. The bank was near bankrupt as its largest client, Machine Agricole Nationale Limitée was in large financial trouble. Amyot was appointed president of the bank, and in the end it was merged with Banque d'Hochelaga, with Amyot as vice president of the new bank.

== Personal life ==
Amyot married Joséphine Tanguay in 1885. He had six children.

== Death ==
He died on March 28, 1930, in Palm Beach, Florida. He is buried in Notre-Dame de Belmont cemetery. Senator Frédéric Liguori Béique said:

Underneath a somewhat stern appearance, Monsieur Amyot had a heart of gold, and few people know the number and magnitude of the donations of all kind which he made. He owed the great fortune he had accumulated only to his energy, loyalty, business sense and excellent judgement.

— Frédéric Liguori Béique,
