= Francis O'Farrell =

Member of the National Assembly of Quebec for Dorchester
- In office 1964–1966
- Preceded by: Joseph-Armand Nadeau
- Succeeded by: Paul-Henri Picard

Personal details
- Born: 8 October 1919 Saint-Malachie, Quebec
- Died: 31 August 1992 (aged 72) Sainte-Foy, Quebec City, Quebec
- Party: Quebec Liberal Party

Francis O'Farrell (8 October 1919 – 31 August 1992) was a Quebec politician who served as a member of the National Assembly of Quebec from 1964 to 1966.

== Education ==
O'Farrell attended Université Laval and Saint Michael's College.

== Political career ==
Francis O'Farrell was the Liberal Party of Canada candidate for Dorchester in the 1962 and 1963 Canadian federal elections.

== See also ==
- 27th Quebec Legislature
