= Alfred Morisset =

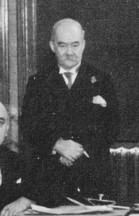
- Alfred Morisset in 1939

Member of the National Assembly of Quebec for Dorchester
- In office 1904–1913
- Preceded by: Louis-Philippe Pelletier
- Succeeded by: Lucien Cannon

Personal details
- Born: July 4, 1874 Sainte-Hénédine
- Died: November 29, 1952 (aged 78) Quebec City
- Party: Quebec Liberal Party
- Education: Laval University

Alfred Morisset (July 4, 1874 – November 29, 1952) was a Quebec physician, politician, and civil servant. He was a member of the National Assembly of Quebec from 1904 to 1913. He served as Clerk of the Executive Council of Quebec from 1913 to 1952.

== Biography ==
Alfred Morisset was the son of Alfred Morisset, a physician, and Aglaé Dion. He studied at the Séminaire de Québec and at Université Laval in Quebec City. He became a physician in 1896 and practiced medicine in Sainte-Hénédine for 17 years. He married Fabiola Vézina on October 8, 1901 in Quebec.

=== MNA ===
In the 1904 Quebec general election, he was the Liberal Party candidate and was elected unopposed as the member of the Legislative Assembly of Quebec for the electoral district of Dorchester. He was re-elected in the 1908 general election, defeating the Conservative Party candidate, former Member of the Legislative Assembly Louis-Philippe Pelletier, who was attempting a comeback. He was re-elected in the 1912 general election, defeating the Conservative Party candidate, Gustave Hamel. He served as Chief whip of the Liberal Party in 1912 and 1913.

=== Clerk of the Executive Council ===
Alfred Morisset is appointed clerk of the Executive Council of Quebec on May 16, 1913, and he held this position until his death in 1952, retaining this post for almost forty years, both in the governments of the Union Nationale and in those of the Liberal Party.

He was a member of the Quebec Geographical Commission from 1923 to 1935.

He is buried in the Notre-Dame-de-Belmont cemetery on December 3, 1952.

== Legacy ==
Morisset Township, located in the municipality of Baie-James, is named in his memory.

== Personal life ==
He is the father of the writer Madeleine des Rivières.
