= Paul-Henri Picard =

Member of the National Assembly of Quebec for Dorchester
- In office 1966–1970
- Preceded by: Francis O'Farrell
- Succeeded by: Florian Guay

Personal details
- Born: 22 January 1923 Saint-Malachie, Quebec
- Died: 29 December 2002 (aged 79) Lac-Etchemin, Quebec
- Party: Union Nationale

Paul-Henri Picard (22 January 1923 – 29 December 2002) was a Quebec politician who served as a member of the National Assembly of Quebec from 1966 to 1970.
