= 1886 Quebec general election =

Canadian provincial election

- October 14, 1886

65 seats in the 6th Legislative Assembly of Quebec 33 seats were needed for a majority
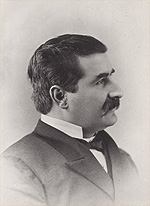

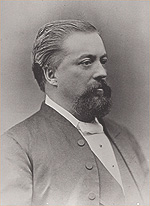
	First party	Second party
Leader	Honoré Mercier	John Jones Ross
Party	Liberal	Conservative
Leader since	1883	1884
Leader's seat	Bonaventure	Councillor for Shawinigan
Last election	15 seats, 38.97%	49 seats, 50.38%
Seats won	33	26
Seat change	▲18	▼23
Popular vote	58,389	68,141
Percentage	39.54%	46.19%
Swing	▲0.57pp	▼4.19pp
Premier before election
John Jones Ross
Conservative
Premier after election
John Jones Ross (Note: Following the election, John Jones Ross continued in office despite his party's minority of elected members. He resigned as party leader on January 25, 1887 in favour of Louis-Olivier Taillon, who was defeated in the legislature on January 27. Honoré Mercier was sworn in as premier on January 29.)
Conservative

The 1886 Quebec general election on October 14, 1886, to elect members of the 6th Legislative Assembly for the Province of Quebec, Canada. The Parti National, a broad coalition formed and led by Honoré Mercier, that included the Parti libéral du Québec and nationalist defectors from the Conservative party. The Parti national got a large boost when Liberals and dissident Conservatives rallied in reaction to the hanging of Louis Riel in 1885, for which the federal Conservatives were held responsible by Quebec voters. The nationalists won a majority of seats against the Parti conservateur du Québec, led by John Jones Ross. A handful of Conservative dissidents remained independent of both parties.

The turnout was 63.96%.

Despite the electoral loss, the Conservative government did not resign; it hung on until the opening of the legislative session in January, hoping that the dissidents might return to the party in the meantime. Finally, on January 25, 1887, recognizing his inability to rally a majority, Ross resigned the party leadership in favour of Louis-Olivier Taillon. Taillon was unable to obtain the confidence of the legislature on its opening day, January 27, 1887, thus was obliged to tender his government's resignation to the lieutenant governor. Mercier became premier on January 29.

== Results ==
Party	Party Leader	# of candidates	Seats			Popular Vote		
Party	Party Leader	# of candidates	1881	Elected	% Change	#	%	% Change
Liberal	Honoré Mercier		15	33	+120%	58 389	39.54%	+0.6%
Conservative	John Jones Ross		49	26	-46.9%	68 141	46.19%	-4.2%
Independent Conservative			1	3	+200%	20 994	14.23%	+3.2%
Parti national	Honoré Mercier		-	3	-	20 994	14.23%	+3.2%
Other			-	-	-	20 994	14.23%	+3.2%
Total			65	65	-		100%	

Popular vote
PCQ	46.19%
PLQ	39.54%
Others	14.23%

Seats summary
PLQ	50.77%
PCQ	40.00%
Others	9.23%

== See also ==
- List of Quebec premiers
- Politics of Quebec
- Timeline of Quebec history
- List of Quebec political parties
- 6th Legislative Assembly of Quebec
