= Couillard (surname) =

Couillard is a French surname. Notable people with the surname include:

- Philippe Couillard (b. 1957), Quebec politician and provincial premier
- Antoine-Gaspard Couillard (1789–1847), Lower Canada seigneur and politician
- Joseph Louis Eugène Couillard, Canadian diplomat
- Julie Couillard, former girlfriend, and source of controversy and scandal for Canadian federal minister Maxime Bernier
