= William Bulloch =

William Bulloch may refer to:

- William Bellinger Bulloch (1777–1852), American politician
- William Bulloch (bacteriologist) (1868–1941), British bacteriologist
- William Ross Bulloch (1884–1954), Canadian politician in the Legislative Assembly of Quebec
