= Jean-Baptiste Bédard (carpenter) =

Jean-Baptiste Bédard (May 18, 1761 – January 7, 1818) was a master carpenter and surveyor in Lower Canada. He was a brother of Thomas-Laurent Bédard.

Bédard was a prolific surveyor during the years that he pursued this career, evidently without the normal formal training. His largest customer was Gaspard-Joseph Chaussegros de Léry for whom he completed 116 survey reports in 1791.

It was as a master carpenter that Jean-Baptiste was most recognized in his lifetime. He devised two models of wooden bridges which were approved by the House of Assembly for exclusive use in Lower Canada by an act in April 1807. Over a period of 14 years their bridges were built according to Bédard's plans.

Beyond bridges, Bédard was a recognized master carpenter with involvement in many public, private and religious architectural projects.
