= Florian Guay =

Canadian politician

Florian Guay was a politician in Quebec, Canada and a Member of the National Assembly of Quebec (MNA).

== Background ==
He was born in Saint-Léon-de-Standon, Quebec on November 23, 1941. Prior to running for office, he was a Social Credit activist and managed a furniture store.

== Provincial politics ==
Guay ran as a candidate of the Ralliement créditiste in the 1970 provincial election and won, becoming the Member of the National Assembly for the district of Dorchester.

During his term of office, the party was plagued by internal divisions. While three MNAs remained loyal to Leader Camil Samson, Guay and the rest of the caucus withdrew their support and appointed Armand Bois as temporary leader, until a leadership convention could determine a new leader.

Eventually, the Samson faction re-joined the party and Yvon Dupuis was chosen as leader. Nonetheless, Guay was defeated and finished third in the district of Beauce-Nord in 1973.

== Town politics ==
Guay was City Councillor from 1974 to 1975 and Mayor from 1975 to 1979 in Saint-Léon-de-Standon.

== Retirement ==
After leaving office, he worked as a building contractor.

== See also ==
- History of Quebec

== Footnotes ==
National Assembly of Quebec
| Preceded by Paul-Henri Picard (Union Nationale) | MNA for Dorchester; 1970–1973 | Succeeded by District abolished in 1972 |
