= Antoine-Gaspard Couillard =

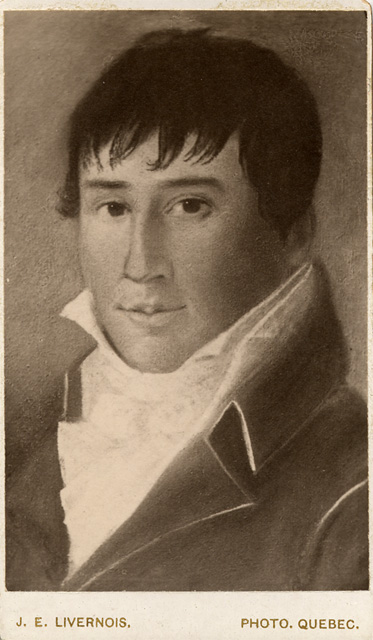
Antoine-Gaspard Couillard-Desprès, ~1820

Antoine-Gaspard Couillard (February 16, 1789 – June 12, 1847) was a seigneur, medical doctor and political figure in Lower Canada.

He was born at Saint-Thomas in Montmagny in 1789, the son of seigneur Jean-Baptiste Couillard and Marie-Angélique Chaussegros de Léry, the

daughter of Gaspard-Joseph Chaussegros de Léry. Couillard studied at the Petit Séminaire de Québec. He articled in law with Alexandre-André-Victor Chaussegros de Léry, but then decided to become a doctor, studying with Samuel Holmes and René-Joseph Kimber. He completed his studies at the University of Pennsylvania and then returned to Lower Canada in 1811 and was authorized to practice medicine. He set up practice at Quebec City and Saint-Thomas. He also served as a surgeon for the militia during the War of 1812. He inherited part of the seigneury of Rivière-du-Sud after his father's death and acquired other parts, becoming the principal owner. Couillard was a member of the Literary and Historical Society of Quebec. He was a justice of the peace and was named to the Legislative Council of Lower Canada in 1832. He was named registrar for Saint-Thomas district in 1842 and for L'Islet County in 1844.

He died at Montmagny in 1847.

His daughter Catherine Charlotte-Éliza married Alexandre-René Chaussegros de Léry, who later served in the Canadian Senate.
