= Adolphe-Philippe Caron =

Canadian politician

The Honourable Sir Adolphe-Philippe Caron PC KCMG
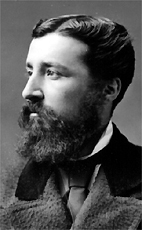
- Caron in 1873

Member of the Canadian Parliament for Quebec County
- In office 1867–1891
- Preceded by: Pierre-Joseph-Olivier Chauveau
- Succeeded by: Jules-Joseph-Taschereau Frémont

Member of the Canadian Parliament for Rimouski
- In office 1891–1896
- Preceded by: Jean-Baptiste Romuald Fiset
- Succeeded by: Jean-Baptiste Romuald Fiset

Member of the Canadian Parliament for Three Rivers and St. Maurice
- In office 1896–1900
- Preceded by: District established in 1892
- Succeeded by: Jacques Bureau

Personal details
- Born: Joseph-Philippe-René-Adolphe Caron; 24 December 1843 Quebec City, Canada, British Empire
- Died: 20 April 1908 (aged 64) Montreal, Quebec, Canada
- Party: Conservative
- Parent: Rene-Edouard Caron

Sir Joseph-Philippe-René-Adolphe Caron, PC KCMG (24 December 1843 – 20 April 1908) was a Canadian lawyer and politician. He is now best remembered as the Minister of Militia and Defence in the government of Sir John A. Macdonald and his role during the North-West Rebellion of 1885.

He was born in Quebec City in 1843, the son of René-Édouard Caron, and studied at the Petit Séminaire de Québec and McGill College. He was called to the bar in 1865 and entered practice with a law firm in Quebec City, later becoming a partner. A Conservative party member, Caron was elected six times to the House of Commons of Canada, first winning election in a by-election in 1873, where he won a seat as a Member of Parliament representing the electoral district of Quebec County. He was re-elected in 1874, 1878, 1880, 1882 and 1887. In the 1891 election, he was elected as the MP for Rimouski, and in 1896 as the MP for Three Rivers and St. Maurice. From 1892 to 1896, he served as Postmaster General of Canada.

After Caron left politics in 1900, he returned to practising law. He died at Montreal in 1908 after having been ill for several months.

There are Adolphe-Philippe Caron fonds at Library and Archives Canada and Bibliothèque et Archives nationales du Québec.

== Electoral history ==
By-election on 28 March 1873
Party	Candidate	Votes
Conservative	Adolphe-Philippe Caron	acclaimed

1874 Canadian federal election: Quebec County
Party	Candidate	Votes
Conservative	Adolphe-Philippe Caron	acclaimed
Source: lop.parl.ca

1878 Canadian federal election: Quebec County
Party	Candidate	Votes
Conservative	Adolphe-Philippe Caron	1,702
Unknown	J. Thibodeau	1,073

By-election: On Mr. Caron being appointed Minister of Militia and Defence, 8 November 1880

By-election on 20 November 1880
Party	Candidate	Votes
Conservative	Adolphe-Philippe Caron	acclaimed

1882 Canadian federal election: Quebec County
Party	Candidate	Votes
Conservative	Adolphe-Philippe Caron	1,438
Unknown	J. E. Bédard	869

1887 Canadian federal election: Quebec County
Party	Candidate	Votes
Conservative	Adolphe-Philippe Caron	1,451
Liberal	Jos. Martin	1,192
