= Némèse Garneau =

Canadian politician

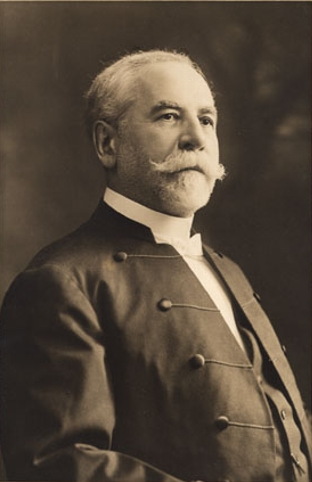

Legislative Councilor for Division of Shawinigan
- In office 1901–1937
- Preceded by: John Jones Ross
- Succeeded by: Jean-Louis Baribeau

MLA for Québec-Comté
- In office 1897–1901
- Preceded by: Charles Fitzpatrick
- Succeeded by: Cyril Fraser Délage

Personal details
- Born: November 15, 1847 Sainte-Anne-de-la-Pérade, Lower Canada
- Died: November 16, 1937 (aged 90) Quebec City, Quebec
- Party: Liberal

Némèse Garneau (November 15, 1847 – November 16, 1937) was a Canadian politician in the province of Quebec.

Born in Sainte-Anne-de-la-Pérade, Lower Canada, the son of Jean-Baptiste Garneau and Nathalie Rinfret dit Malouin, Garneau was the owner of a dry goods business. He was president of the General Live Stock Breeders' Association and a member of the executive committee of the Dairy Men's Association from 1896 to 1905. He was also president of the Chicoutimi Pulp Company and a director of the Quebec Bridge & Railway Company.

He was elected to the Legislative Assembly of Quebec for the electoral district of Québec-Comté in the 1897 election. A Liberal, he was re-elected by acclamation in the 1900 election. He was appointed to the Legislative Council of Quebec in 1901 for the Shawinigan division. He was briefly the Minister of Agriculture in the cabinet of Simon-Napoléon Parent in March 1905. He served until his death in 1937.

He was made a Commander of the Order of St. Gregory the Great in 1916.
