= Joseph-Damase Bégin =

Canadian politician

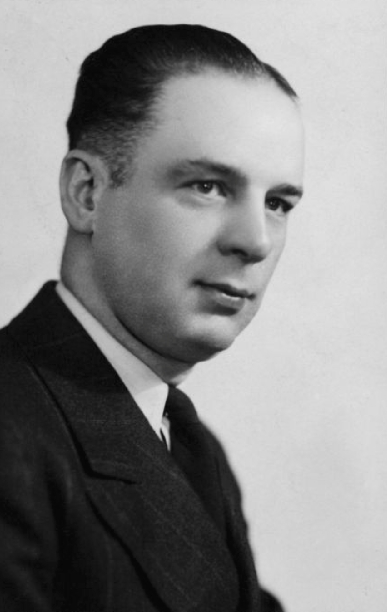

Member of the Legislative Assembly of Quebec for Dorchester
- In office 1935–1962
- Preceded by: Joseph-Charles-Ernest Ouellet
- Succeeded by: Joseph-Armand Nadeau

Personal details
- Born: August 6, 1900 Sainte-Germaine-du-Lac-Etchemin, Quebec
- Died: July 4, 1977 (aged 76) Sainte-Foy, Quebec
- Party: Action libérale nationale Union Nationale

Joseph-Damase Bégin, also known as Jos-D. Bégin, was a Canadian politician and an eight-term Member of the Legislative Assembly of Quebec.

== Background ==
He was born on August 6, 1900, in Sainte-Germaine-du-Lac-Etchemin, Quebec, and was a car dealer.

== Member of the legislature ==
Bégin first won a seat to the Legislative Assembly of Quebec as an Action libérale nationale candidate in 1935 in the district of Dorchester.

His party merged with the Conservative Party of Quebec to form the Union Nationale. Bégin won re-election in 1936, 1939, 1944, 1948, 1952, 1956 and, with a substantially reduced margin, in 1960.

== Cabinet Member ==
From 1940 to 1960, Bégin served as his party's campaign manager. He was appointed to Premier Maurice Duplessis's Cabinet in 1944. He did not run for re-election in 1962.

== Death ==
He died on July 4, 1977.
