= Quebec County (federal electoral district) =

Former federal electoral district in Quebec, Canada

Coordinates: 46.82°N 71.21°W

Quebec electoral district

Defunct federal electoral district
- Legislature: House of Commons
- District created: 1867
- District abolished: 1924
- First contested: 1867
- Last contested: 1921

Quebec County (French: Comté de Québec) was a federal electoral district in Quebec, Canada, that was represented in the House of Commons of Canada from 1867 to 1925.

It was created by The British North America Act, 1867 which preserved existing ridings in Lower Canada. It was abolished in 1924 when it was merged into Québec—Montmorency riding.

== Members of Parliament ==
This riding elected the following members of Parliament:

Parliament	Years	Member	Party
Quebec County
1st	1867–1872	Pierre-Joseph-Olivier Chauveau	Conservative
2nd	1872–1873	Pierre-Joseph-Olivier Chauveau	Conservative
2nd	1873–1874	Adolphe-Philippe Caron	Conservative
3rd	1874–1878	Adolphe-Philippe Caron	Conservative
4th	1878–1880	Adolphe-Philippe Caron	Conservative
4th	1880–1882	Adolphe-Philippe Caron	Conservative
5th	1882–1887	Adolphe-Philippe Caron	Conservative
6th	1887–1891	Adolphe-Philippe Caron	Conservative
7th	1891–1896	Jules-Joseph-Taschereau Frémont	Liberal
8th	1896–1896	Charles Fitzpatrick	Liberal
8th	1896–1900	Charles Fitzpatrick	Liberal
9th	1900–1904	Charles Fitzpatrick	Liberal
10th	1904–1906	Charles Fitzpatrick	Liberal
10th	1906–1908	Lorenzo Robitaille	Independent Liberal
11th	1908–1911	Joseph-Pierre Turcotte	Liberal
12th	1911–1911	Louis-Philippe Pelletier	Conservative
12th	1911–1914	Louis-Philippe Pelletier	Conservative
12th	1914–1917	Thomas Chase-Casgrain	Conservative
13th	1917–1921	Henri-Edgar Lavigueur	Opposition (Laurier Liberals)
14th	1921–1925	Henri-Edgar Lavigueur	Liberal
Riding dissolved into Québec—Montmorency

== Election results ==
1867 Canadian federal election
Party	Candidate	Votes
Conservative	Pierre-Joseph-Olivier Chauveau	acclaimed
Source: Canadian Elections Database

1872 Canadian federal election
Party	Candidate	Votes
Conservative	Pierre-Joseph-Olivier Chauveau	1,415
Unknown	M. Hearn	316
Source: Canadian Elections Database

By-election: On Mr. Chauveau being called to the Senate, 20 February 1873

By-election on 28 March 1873
Party	Candidate	Votes
Conservative	Adolphe-Philippe Caron	acclaimed

1874 Canadian federal election
Party	Candidate	Votes
Conservative	Adolphe-Philippe Caron	acclaimed
Source: lop.parl.ca

1878 Canadian federal election
Party	Candidate	Votes
Conservative	Adolphe-Philippe Caron	1,702
Unknown	J. Thibodeau	1,073

By-election: On Mr. Caron being appointed Minister of Militia and Defence, 8 November 1880

By-election on 20 November 1880
Party	Candidate	Votes
Conservative	Adolphe-Philippe Caron	acclaimed

1882 Canadian federal election
Party	Candidate	Votes
Conservative	Adolphe-Philippe Caron	1,438
Unknown	J. E. Bédard	869

1887 Canadian federal election
Party	Candidate	Votes
Conservative	Adolphe-Philippe Caron	1,451
Liberal	Jos. Martin	1,192

1891 Canadian federal election
Party	Candidate	Votes
Liberal	Jules-Joseph-Taschereau Frémont	1,692
Conservative	Edmund James Flynn	1,352

1896 Canadian federal election
Party	Candidate	Votes
Liberal	Charles Fitzpatrick	1,982
Liberal	Jules-Joseph-Taschereau Frémont	1,058

By-election: On Mr. Fitzpatrick being appointed Solicitor General, 11 July 1896

By-election on 30 July 1896
Party	Candidate	Votes
Liberal	Charles Fitzpatrick	acclaimed

1900 Canadian federal election
Party	Candidate	Votes
Liberal	Charles Fitzpatrick	2,201
Conservative	L. A. Beaubien	911

1904 Canadian federal election
Party	Candidate	Votes
Liberal	Charles Fitzpatrick	2,445
Conservative	J. P. H. Pageot	271

By-election: On Mr. Fitzpatrick being appointed Chief Justice of Canada, 4 June 1906

By-election on 23 October 1906
Party	Candidate	Votes
Independent Liberal	Lorenzo Robitaille	2,087
Liberal	G. E. Amyot	1,699

1908 Canadian federal election
Party	Candidate	Votes
Liberal	Joseph-Pierre Turcotte	2,139
Independent Liberal	Lorenzo Robitaille	1,993
Independent Liberal	Alfred Martineau	38

1911 Canadian federal election
Party	Candidate	Votes
Conservative	Louis-Philippe Pelletier	2,295
Liberal	Jean-Baptiste Caouette	2,247

By-election: On Mr. Pelletier being appointed Postmaster General, 10 October 1911

By-election on 27 October 1911
Party	Candidate	Votes
Conservative	Louis-Philippe Pelletier	acclaimed

By-election: On Mr. Pelletier's resignation, 20 October 1914

By-election on 7 November 1914
Party	Candidate	Votes
Conservative	Thomas Chase-Casgrain	acclaimed

1921 Canadian federal election
Party	Candidate	Votes
Liberal	Henri-Edgar Lavigueur	6,843
Independent	Armand Lavergne	4,547

1917 Canadian federal election
Party	Candidate	Votes
Opposition (Laurier Liberals)	Henri-Edgar Lavigueur	4,799
Government (Unionist)	Joseph-Édouard Barnard	546

== See also ==
- List of Canadian electoral districts
- Historical federal electoral districts of Canada
