= Joseph-Pierre Turcotte =

Canadian politician

Joseph-Pierre Turcotte (May 21, 1857 – January 6, 1939) was a lawyer, journalist and political figure in Quebec. He represented Quebec County in the House of Commons of Canada from 1908 to 1911 as a Liberal.

He was born in Saint-Jean, Île d'Orléans, Canada East, the son of François-Xavier Turcotte and Élisabeth Rousseau. Turcotte was admitted to the Quebec bar in 1881 and practised in Quebec City. He was an unsuccessful candidate for a seat in the Quebec assembly in 1886 and 1896. He contributed to a number of publications including the Petit Journal, the Revue de Québec and the Électeur. In 1910, he was named King's Counsel.

== Electoral record ==
1908 Canadian federal election: Quebec County
| Party | Candidate | Votes |
|---|---|---|
| Liberal | Joseph-Pierre Turcotte | 2,139 |
| Independent Liberal | Lorenzo Robitaille | 1,993 |
| Independent Liberal | Alfred Martineau | 38 |

1911 Canadian federal election: Quebec County
| Party | Candidate | Votes |
|---|---|---|
| Conservative | Louis-Philippe Pelletier | 2,295 |
| Liberal | Jean-Baptiste Caouette | 2,247 |

By-election: On Mr. Pelletier being appointed Postmaster General, 10 October 1911

By-election on 27 October 1911
| Party | Candidate | Votes |
| Conservative | Louis-Philippe Pelletier | acclaimed |
