= Dorchester (provincial electoral district) =

Coordinates: 46.75°N 70.66°W

Quebec electoral district

Defunct provincial electoral district
- Legislature: National Assembly of Quebec
- District created: 1867
- District abolished: 1972
- First contested: 1867
- Last contested: 1970
- Communities: Saint-Prosper-de-Dorchester

Dorchester was a provincial electoral district in the Chaudière-Appalaches region of the province of Quebec, Canada.

It was created for the 1867 election (and an electoral district of that name existed earlier in the Legislative Assembly of the Province of Canada and the Legislative Assembly of Lower Canada). Its final election was in 1970. It disappeared in the 1973 election and its successor electoral districts were Bellechasse, Beauce-Nord, and Beauce-Sud.

== Members of the Legislative Assembly / National Assembly ==
- Hector-Louis Langevin, Conservative Party (1867–1871)
- Louis-Napoléon Larochelle, Conservative Party (1871–1878)
- Nicodème Audet, Conservative Party (1878–1886)
- Louis-Napoléon Larochelle, Conservative Party – Nationalist (1886–1888)
- Louis-Philippe Pelletier, Nationalist Conservative – Conservative Party (1888–1904)
- Alfred Morisset, Liberal (1904–1913)
- Lucien Cannon, Liberal (1913–1917)
- Joseph-Charles-Ernest Ouellet, Liberal (1917–1935)
- Joseph-Damase Bégin, Action liberale nationale – Union Nationale (1935–1962)
- Joseph-Armand Nadeau, Union Nationale (1962–1963)
- Francis O'Farrell, Liberal (1964–1966)
- Paul-Henri Picard, Union Nationale (1966–1970)
- Florian Guay, Ralliement créditiste du Québec (1970–1973)
