= John Jones Ross =

Premier of Quebec from 1884 to 1887

The Honourable John Jones Ross PC
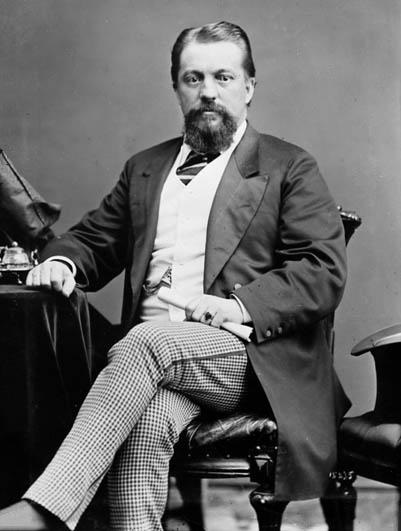

7th Premier of Quebec
- In office January 23, 1884 – January 25, 1887
- Monarch: Victoria
- Lieutenant Governor: Théodore Robitaille; Louis-Rodrigue Masson
- Preceded by: Joseph-Alfred Mousseau
- Succeeded by: Louis-Olivier Taillon

Senator for De la Durantaye, Quebec
- In office April 12, 1887 – May 4, 1901
- Preceded by: Jean-Charles Chapais
- Succeeded by: Alphonse Arthur Miville Déchêne

Member of the Canadian Parliament for Champlain
- In office September 20, 1867 – January 22, 1874
- Preceded by: New position
- Succeeded by: Hippolyte Montplaisir

Member of the Legislative Council of Quebec for Shawinigan
- In office November 2, 1867 – May 4, 1901
- Appointed by: Narcisse-Fortunat Belleau
- Preceded by: New position
- Succeeded by: Némèse Garneau

MLA for Champlain
- In office September 1, 1867 – November 2, 1867
- Preceded by: New position
- Succeeded by: Jean-Charles Chapais

Member of the Legislative Assembly of the Province of Canada for Champlain
- In office 1861–1867
- Preceded by: Joseph-Édouard Turcotte
- Succeeded by: Position abolished

Personal details
- Born: August 16, 1831 Quebec City, Lower Canada
- Died: May 4, 1901 (aged 69) Sainte-Anne-de-la-Pérade (La Pérade), Quebec, Canada
- Party: Conservative
- Spouse: Arline Lanouette (m. 1854)
- Occupation: Physician; militia officer
- Cabinet: Canada: Minister Without Portfolio (1896); Quebec: Commissioner of Railways (1881–1882); Commissioner of Agriculture and Public Works (1884–1887)
- Portfolio: Canada: Speaker of the Senate (1891–1896); Quebec: President of the Legislative Council (1873–1874 & 1876–1878 & 1879–1881)

John Jones Ross PC (August 16, 1831 – May 4, 1901) was a Canadian politician. Ross served as the seventh premier of Quebec and later as a member of the Senate of Canada.

== Personal life ==
Ross was born in Quebec City, Canada. He was the son of a Scots-Quebecer merchant, George McIntosh Ross, and his French-Canadian wife Sophie-Éloïse Gouin.

== Political career ==
=== Province of Canada Assembly ===
Ross belonged to the Parti bleu and was elected to the Legislative Assembly of the Province of Canada for the district of Champlain in 1861. He was re-elected in 1863 and served until 1867.

=== Provincial politics ===
Ross was elected to the newly established Legislative Assembly of Quebec for the district of Champlain in 1867, but resigned only a few months later to become a Conservative Member of the Legislative Council of Quebec for Shawinigan. From 1873 to 1874, 1876 to 1878 and 1879 to 1882, Ross served as Speaker of the Legislative Council, of whom he remained a member until his death in 1901.

He was Minister without Portfolio from 1876 to 1878 and from 1879 to 1881, as well as the seventh Premier of Quebec from January 23, 1884, to January 25, 1887,

=== Federal politics ===
Ross successfully ran as a Conservative candidate for the district of Champlain in the 1867 and 1872 federal elections, but did not run for re-election in 1874.

He was appointed to the Senate of Canada for the Division of La Durantaye in 1887 and served as Speaker of that institution from 1891 to 1896.

Ross also was Minister without Portfolio in the federal Cabinet for a couple of months in 1896.

=== Elections as party leader ===
He lost the 1886 provincial election as Leader of the Conservative Party of Quebec but remained in power in a minority government until he resigned on January 25, 1887. He died in 1901 in Quebec City.

== See also ==
- Politics of Quebec
- List of Quebec general elections
- Timeline of Quebec history
