= Thomas-Laurent Bédard =

- Born: February 3, 1747; Charlesbourg, Canada
- Died: May 27, 1795 (aged 48); Quebec City, Lower Canada

Thomas-Laurent Bédard (February 3, 1747 – May 27, 1795) was a priest, educator and the superior of the Séminaire of Quebec. He was a brother of Jean-Baptiste Bédard.
