= Lorenzo Robitaille =

Canadian politician

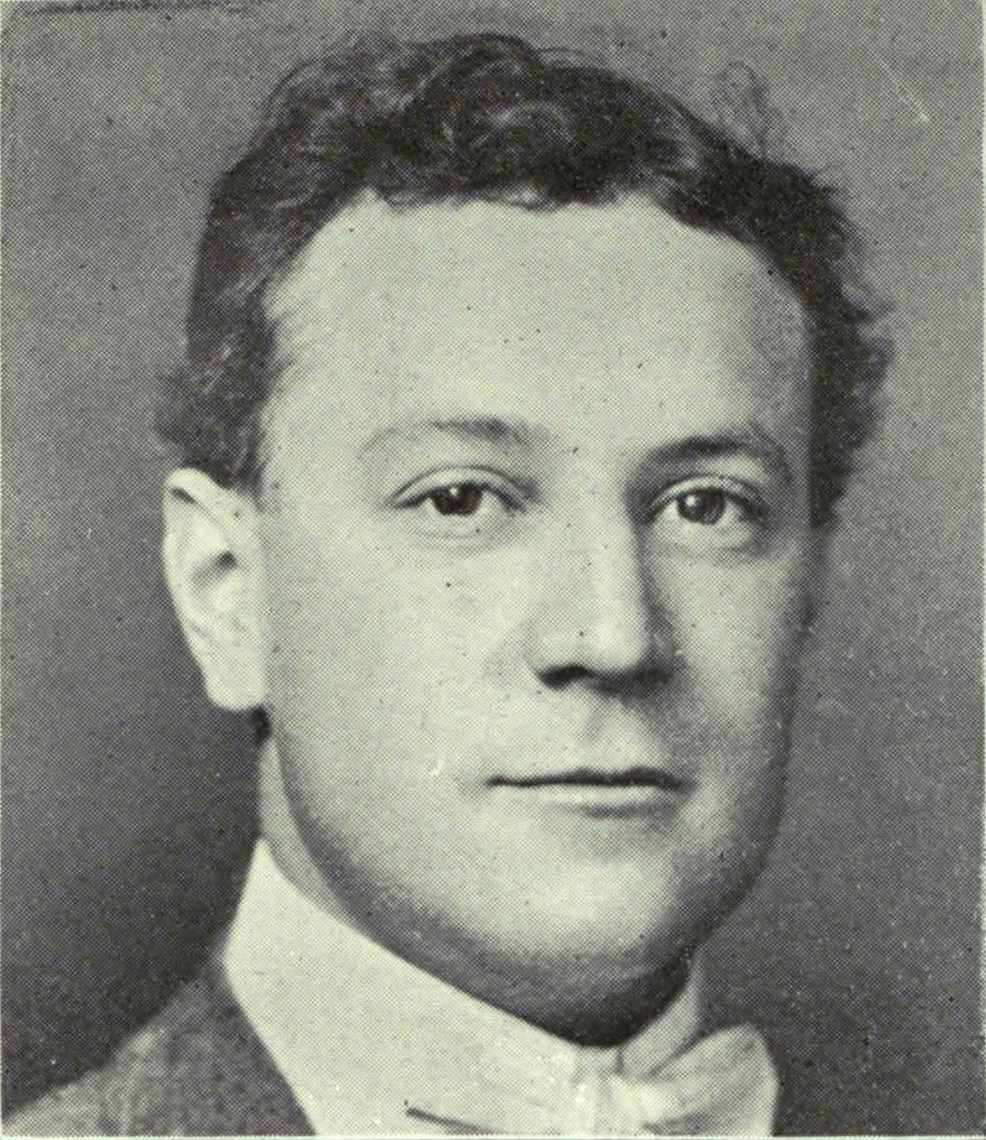

Member of the Canadian Parliament for Quebec County
- In office 1906–1908
- Preceded by: Charles Fitzpatrick
- Succeeded by: Joseph-Pierre Turcotte

Personal details
- Born: May 27, 1882 Quebec City, Quebec
- Died: August 14, 1952 (aged 70) Montreal, Quebec
- Party: Independent Liberal

Lorenzo Robitaille (May 27, 1882 – August 14, 1952) was a Canadian politician.

Born in Beauport, Quebec, the son of Alfred and Elizabeth (née Lynotte) Robitaille, he was educated at the Mount St. Louis College at Montreal. He was in partnership with his father in the distillery business at Quebec and Beauport and owner of a Sugar and Vegetable preserve faction at St. Johns, Quebec. He was chosen Secretary of the Manufacturers Association of the Province of Quebec. He was elected to the House of Commons of Canada for the riding of Quebec County in a 1906 by-election caused by the appointment of Charles Fitzpatrick as Chief Justice of Canada. An Independent Liberal, Robitaille defeated the official Liberal candidate but went on to be defeated in the 1908 election.

== Electoral history ==
By-election on 23 October 1906
Party	Candidate	Votes
Independent Liberal	Lorenzo Robitaille	2,087
Liberal	G. E. Amyot	1,699

1908 Canadian federal election: Quebec County
Party	Candidate	Votes
Liberal	Joseph-Pierre Turcotte	2,139
Independent Liberal	Lorenzo Robitaille	1,993
Independent Liberal	Alfred Martineau	38
