= Jules-Joseph-Taschereau Frémont =

Canadian politician

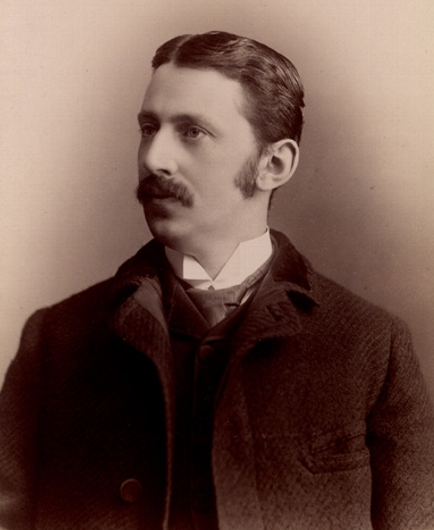

22nd Mayor of Quebec City
- In office 1 March 1890 – 2 April 1894
- Preceded by: François Langelier
- Succeeded by: Simon-Napoléon Parent

Member of Parliament for Quebec County
- In office April 1891 – June 1896
- Preceded by: Adolphe-Philippe Caron
- Succeeded by: Charles Fitzpatrick

Personal details
- Born: 20 December 1855 Quebec City
- Died: 28 March 1902 (aged 46) Quebec City
- Party: Liberal
- Spouse: Caroline-Alix Beaubien
- Profession: author, lawyer, professor

Jules-Joseph-Taschereau Frémont (20 December 1855 – 28 March 1902) was a Canadian politician, author, lawyer and professor. He was a Liberal member of the House of Commons of Canada and a mayor of Quebec City.

== Biography ==
Frémont was born in Quebec City, Canada East, the son of doctor Charles-Jacques Frémont and Marie-Cécile Panet. He was educated at the Collège Sainte-Marie, at St. Francis Xavier's College in New York City and the Université Laval and was called to the Quebec bar in 1878. He later became a professor of civil law at the Université Laval.

He was elected to Parliament at the Quebec County riding in the 1891 general election. After serving his term in the 7th Parliament, Frémont was defeated in the 1896 federal election by Charles Fitzpatrick, also of the Liberal party.

The inaugural Quebec Winter Carnival in 1894 occurred on Frémont's watch as Quebec City mayor.

In 1891, Frémont married Caroline-Alix, the daughter of Joseph-Octave Beaubien, a member of the 1st Canadian Parliament.

Frémont died at Quebec City at the age of 46 after a long illness.

== Publications ==
- Le divorce et la séparation de corps
- Compendium of the Dominion Laws of Canada

== Electoral record ==
1891 Canadian federal election: Quebec County
Party	Candidate	Votes
Liberal	Jules-Joseph-Taschereau Frémont	1,692
Conservative	Edmund James Flynn	1,352

1896 Canadian federal election: Quebec County
Party	Candidate	Votes
Liberal	Charles Fitzpatrick	1,982
Liberal	Jules-Joseph-Taschereau Frémont	1,058
