= Arthur Buies =

Canadian journalist (1840–1901)

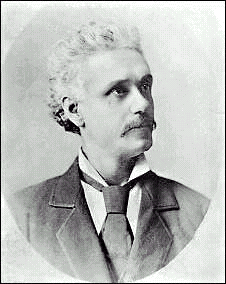
- Buies circa 1860
- Born: January 24, 1840; Côte-des-Neiges, Montreal
- Died: January 26, 1901 (aged 61); Quebec City, Quebec
- Burial place: Notre-Dame-de-Belmont
- Citizenship: Canada
- Notable work: La Lanterne
- Spouse: Marie-Mila Catellier (m. 1887)
- Children: 5

Signature
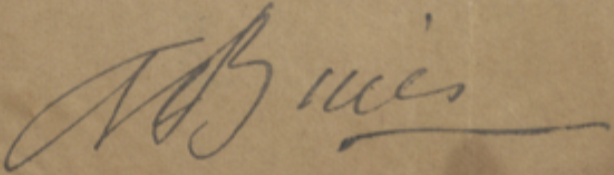

Arthur Buies (baptized Joseph-Marie-Arthur; January 24, 1840 – January 26, 1901) was a Canadian journalist and essayist from Quebec. A member of the Royal Canadian Institute, he severely opposed the Canadian Confederation in 1867.

== Biography ==
Arthur Buies was born on January 24, 1840, in Côte-des-Neiges, Montreal. He was the son of William Buie, a Scottish banker, and Marie-Antoinette-Léocadie d'Estimauville, who was from Old French nobility. Buies was the second child overall.

His father was living in New York at the time of Buies' birth. Afterwards in 1841, his parents moved to Guyana, where his father held his position as the postmaster. He and his sister, Victoire, were left with their great-aunts.

Buies attended the Collège de Sainte-Anne-de-la-Pocatière from 1849 to 1854, the Séminaire de Nicolet from 1854 to 1855 and the Petit Séminaire de Québec from 1855 to 1856. In 1860, he gave Latin and English lessons in Palaiseau, France. That same year, Buies joined Garibaldi’s army in Sicily.

== Career ==
In 1862, he moved to Montreal, where he became a member of the Royal Canadian Institute. Buies severely opposed the Canadian Confederation in 1867. In 1868, he published La Lanterne, a satirical newspaper. It ran until 1869. Buies later settled in Quebec City and continued to write about the economic, social, and cultural development of Canada under France. In 1879, he met Antoine Labelle, where they promoted colonization in the Laurentians.

== Personal life and death ==
Buies married Marie-Mila Catellier on August 8, 1887, in Notre-Dame Basilica. They would have five children, two of whom died in infancy. Buies died on January 26, 1901, after suffering from an illness he had gotten prior. He was 61. He was buried in the Notre-Dame de Belmont in Sainte-Foy, Quebec City.
