= Thomas-Philippe Pelletier =

Canadian politician

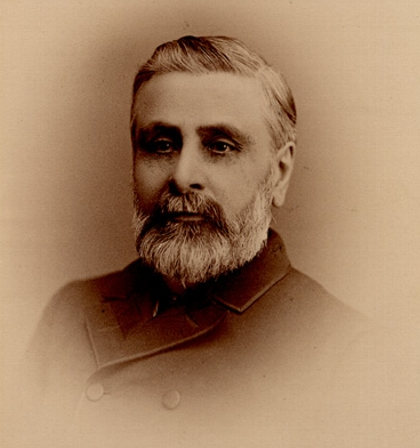

Member of the Legislative Council of Quebec for Grandville
- In office 1892–1913
- Preceded by: Élisée Dionne
- Succeeded by: John Hall Kelly

Personal details
- Born: 22 December 1823 Sainte-Anne-de-la-Pocatière, Lower Canada
- Died: 28 April 1913 (aged 89) Trois-Pistoles, Quebec
- Party: Conservative
- Children: Louis-Philippe Pelletier

Thomas-Philippe Pelletier (22 December 1823 – 28 April 1913) was a Canadian merchant and politician.

== Biography ==
Born in Sainte-Anne-de-la-Pocatière, Lower Canada, the son of Germain Pelletier and Marie Marthe Pelletier, he was educated at the Collège de Sainte-Anne-de-la-Pocatière and then became a school teacher. He later opened a general merchandise business in Trois-Pistoles where he was the postmaster for fifty-three years. In 1892, he was appointed to the Legislative Council of Quebec for the division of Grandville. A Conservative, he served until his death in 1913.

He married Caroline Casault, the daughter of Louis-Napoléon Casault in 1854. He was the father of Louis-Philippe Pelletier.
