= George Couture =

Member of the Legislative Council of Quebec for Lauzon
- In office 1881–1887
- Appointed by: Joseph-Adolphe Chapleau
- Preceded by: Alexandre-René Chaussegros de Léry
- Succeeded by: Louis-Philippe Pelletier

Personal details
- Born: June 4, 1824 Saint-Joseph (now in Lauzon), Lower Canada
- Died: November 4, 1887 (aged 63) Lévis, Quebec
- Party: Conservative

George Couture (June 4, 1824 – November 4, 1887) was a Canadian merchant and politician.

Born in Saint-Joseph (now in Lauzon), Lower Canada, Couture was elected to the Lévis municipal council in 1865. He was mayor from 1870 to 1881. Couture was appointed to the Legislative Council of Quebec for Lauzon in 1881. A Conservative, he served until his death in 1887.

In 1884 he was made a Knight of the Order of the Holy Sepulchre.
