= William Ross Bulloch =

Canadian politician (1884–1954)

Member of the Legislative Assembly of Quebec for Westmount
- In office 1936–1939
- Preceded by: Charles Allan Smart
- Succeeded by: District was abolished in 1939

Personal details
- Born: June 7, 1884 Dunoon, Scotland
- Died: June 19, 1954 (aged 70) Montreal, Quebec
- Party: Union Nationale

William Ross Bulloch (June 7, 1884 – June 19, 1954) was a Canadian politician. He was a Member of the Legislative Assembly of Quebec.

== Background ==
He was born in Dunoon, Scotland, on June 7, 1884.

== Member of the legislature ==
Bulloch was elected to Quebec's legislative assembly in the provincial riding of Westmount in the 1936 election and sat with the Union Nationale caucus. He lost re-election as a Conservative in the district of Montréal-Notre-Dame-de-Grâce in the 1939 election.

== City Councillor ==
He served as a city councillor in Montreal from 1944 until his death.

== Death ==
Bulloch died on June 19, 1954, in Montreal.
