= Cimetière Notre-Dame-de-Belmont =

Roman Catholic cemetery in Quebec, Canada

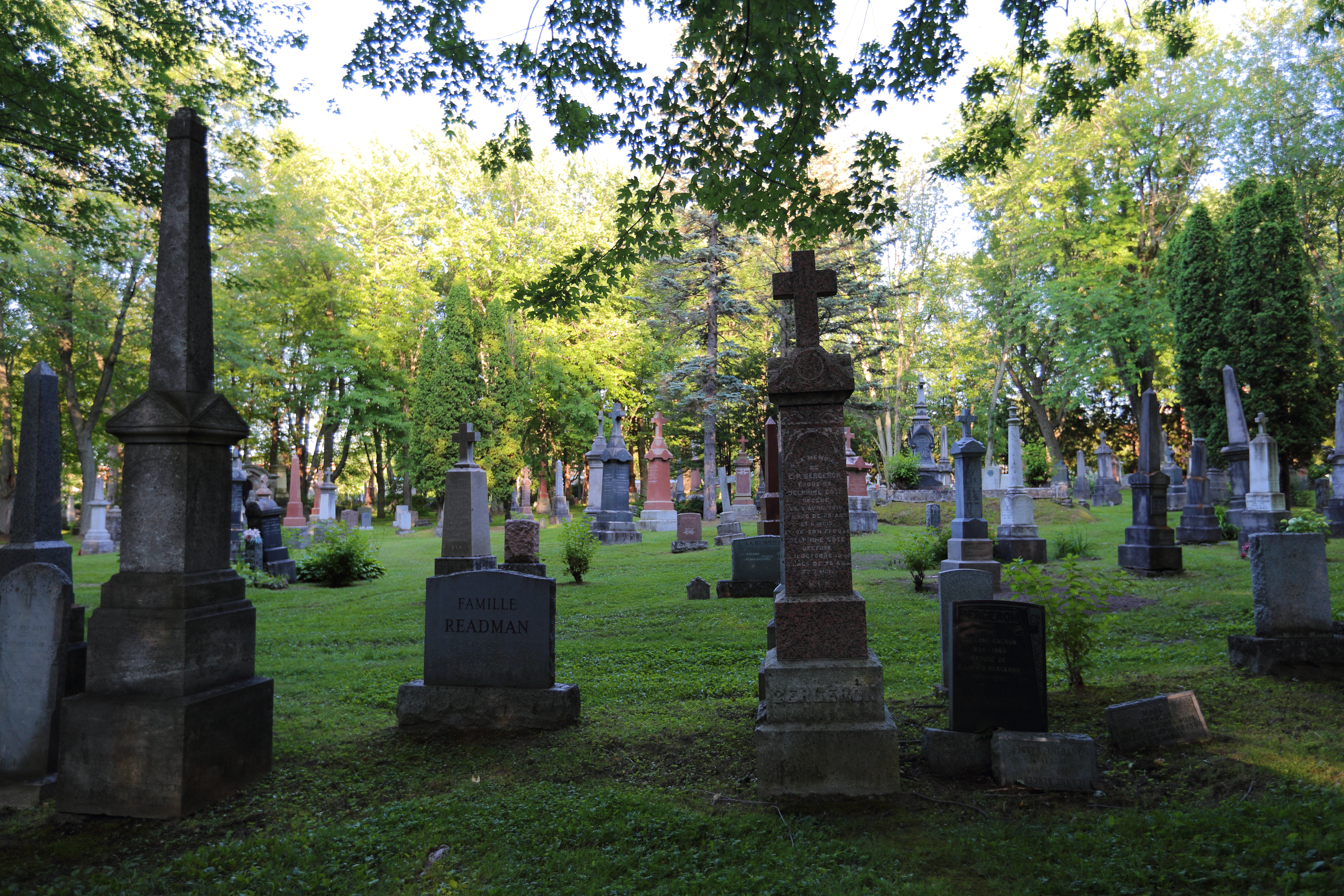
- Cimetière Notre-Dame-de-Belmont, July 2017
- Interactive map of Cimetière Notre-Dame-de-Belmont

Details
- Established: 1859
- Location: 701, avenue Nérée-Tremblay; Quebec City, Quebec; G1N 4R8
- Coordinates: 46°47′26″N 71°16′31″W
- Type: Roman Catholic
- Website: Official website (in French)

The Cimetière Notre-Dame-de-Belmont (French pronunciation: [simtjɛʁ nɔtʁə dam də bɛlmɔ̃]; English: Belmont Cemetery) is a historic garden cemetery located in Quebec City, Quebec, Canada. The Roman Catholic cemetery was built between 1857 and 1859. Its architect, Charles Baillargé, took inspiration from the noted garden cemetery of Green-Wood, in Brooklyn, New York State, United States. The cemetery was blessed on July 10, 1859, and Belmont Cemetery's first burial took place two days later.

The war graves section is maintained by the Commonwealth War Graves Commission.

Undeveloped sections remain next to Quebec Autoroute 440. On the grounds is Coopérative funéraire des Deux Rives – Centre du Plateau.

The cemetery is now surround by residential homes and Parc Centre de glisse Myrand.

== Notable interments ==
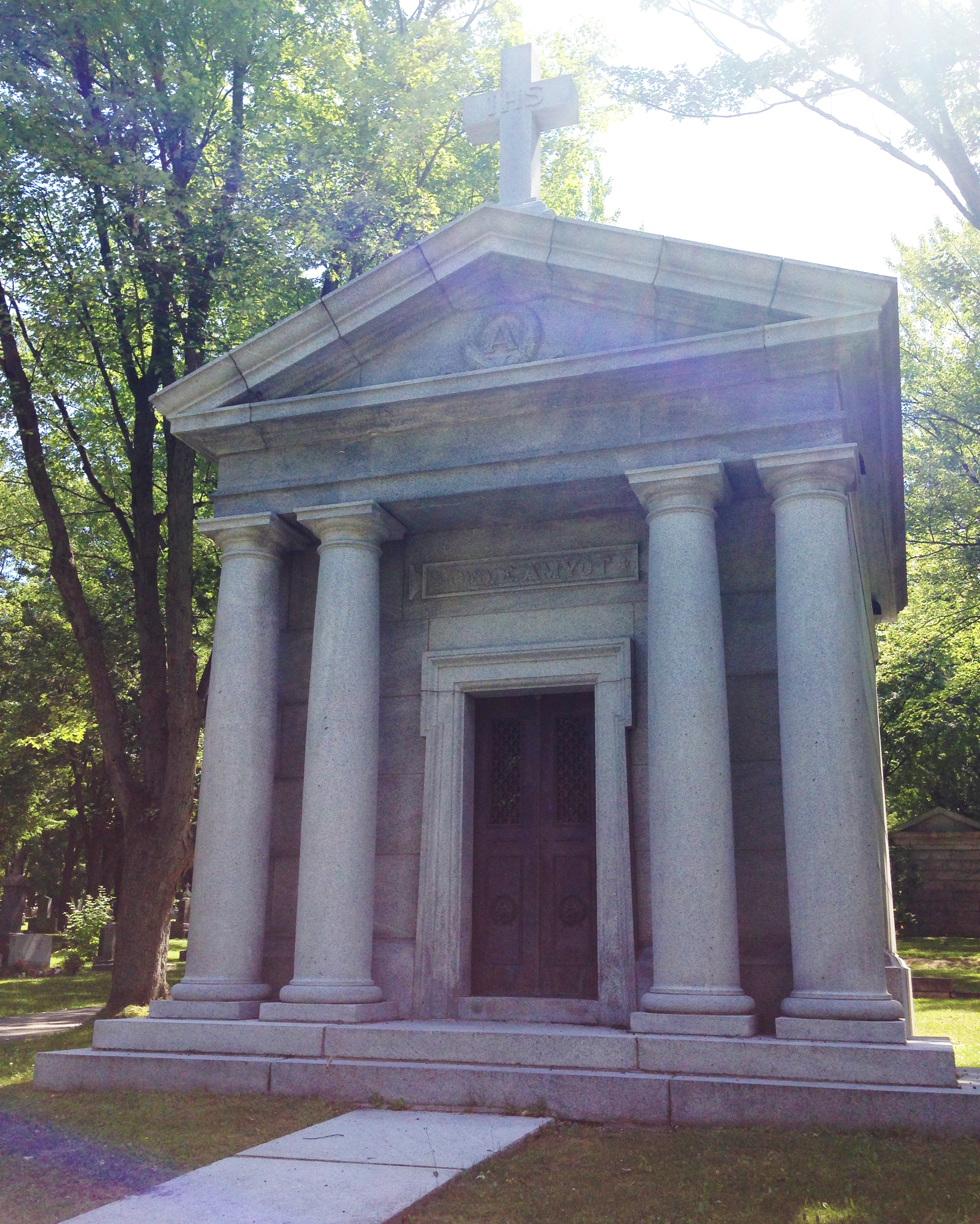
The mausoleum of Georges-Élie Amyot

- Jean Victor Allard (1913–1996): first French-speaking Chief of Defense Staff
- Georges-Élie Amyot (1856–1930): politician, businessman
- Valmore Bienvenue (1894–1952): American-born jurist, politician
- Arthur Buies (1840–1901): journalist, scholar
- René-Édouard Caron (1800–1876)
- Eugène Chinic (1818–1889): entrepreneur, bank founder, statesman
- Julien Chouinard (1929–1987): lawyer, justice of the Supreme Court of Canada
- Antoine Dessane (1826–1873): French-born composer
- Joseph Marmette Sr. (1813–1896) Father of Joseph Marmette Jr.
- Edmund James Flynn (1847–1927): Premier of Québec
- Ernest Gagnon (1834–1915): organist, historian, composer
- Édouard Burroughs Garneau (1859–1911) : politician
- François-Xavier Garneau (1809–1866): historian
- Jean Lesage (1912–1980): lawyer, Premier of Québec
- Félix-Gabriel Marchand (1832–1900): Premier of Québec
- Georges Parent (1879–1942): lawyer, statesman
- Yves Pratte (1925–1988): lawyer, Justice of the Supreme Court of Canada
- Louis-Alexandre Taschereau (1867–1952): lawyer, Premier of Québec
- Ulric-Joseph Tessier (1817–1892): statesman
- Robert Taschereau (1896–1970): lawyer, Chief Justice of Canada
- Joseph Vézina (1849–1924): orchestra conductor, composer

== War graves ==
The cemetery contains the war graves of 27 Commonwealth service personnel, 4 from World War I and 23 from World War II, which are headstoned. In addition another 13 whose graves could no longer be marked or maintained are alternatively commemorated on The Quebec Memorial at the National Field of Honour, Pointe-Claire.

There is a group of 28 gravestones of members of the Royal 22nd Regiment who died between 1929 and 1960 in the Notre Dame de Belmont Cemetery in Quebec City, Quebec. Four gravestones, dated 1929, 1935, 1938, 1938 feature a crown, beaver and regimental motto. Seven gravestones, dated 1939, 1941, 1941, 1942, 1942, 1942, 1947 feature the Maple Leaf and Canadian Forces cross. Seven gravestones feature the Canadian Forces cross dated 1954, 1954, 1955, 1955, 1955, 1954, 1960.
