= Édouard Burroughs Garneau =

Canadian politician

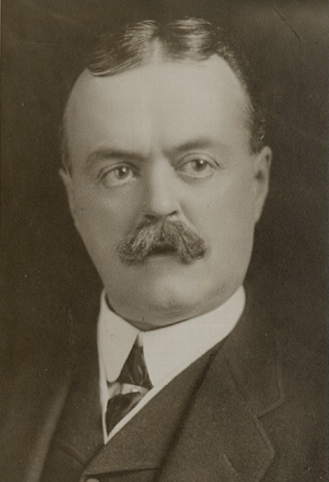

Member of the Legislative Council of Quebec for de La Durantaye
- In office 1904–1911
- Preceded by: Pierre Garneau
- Succeeded by: Georges-Élie Amyot

Personal details
- Born: 18 January 1859 Quebec City, Canada East
- Died: 18 August 1911 (aged 52) Quebec City, Quebec
- Resting place: Cimetière Notre-Dame-de-Belmont
- Party: Liberal
- Relations: Pierre Garneau, father

Édouard Burroughs Garneau (18 January 1859 – 18 August 1911) was a Canadian politician.

Born in Quebec City, Canada East, the son of Pierre Garneau, Garneau was appointed to the Legislative Council of Quebec for de La Durantaye in 1904. A Liberal, he served until his death in 1911. Hi was the brother of Sir Georges Garneau, mayor of Quebec city.
