= Nicodème Audet =

Canadian politician

Member of the Legislative Council of Quebec for Lauzon
- In office 1892–1905
- Preceded by: Louis-Napoléon Larochelle
- Succeeded by: Blaise-Ferdinand Letellier

Member of the Legislative Assembly of Quebec for Dorchester
- In office 1878–1886
- Preceded by: Louis-Napoléon Larochelle
- Succeeded by: Louis-Napoléon Larochelle

Personal details
- Born: September 14, 1822 Saint-Gervais, Lower Canada
- Died: April 19, 1905 (aged 82) Saint-Anselme, Quebec
- Party: Conservative

Nicodème Audet (September 14, 1822 – April 19, 1905) was a merchant and political figure in Quebec. He represented Dorchester in the Legislative Assembly of Quebec from 1878 to 1886 as a Conservative. His name also appears as Nicodème Audet, dit Lapointe.

He was born in Saint-Gervais, Lower Canada, the son of Augustin Audet dit Lapointe and Marie Dallaire, and was educated in Saint-Anselme. He set up business in Saint-Anselme. He married Marie-Célina Turgeon in 1856. In 1892, Audet was named to the Legislative Council of Quebec for Lauzon division. He died in office in Saint-Anselme at the age of 82.
