= Blaise-Ferdinand Letellier =

Canadian politician

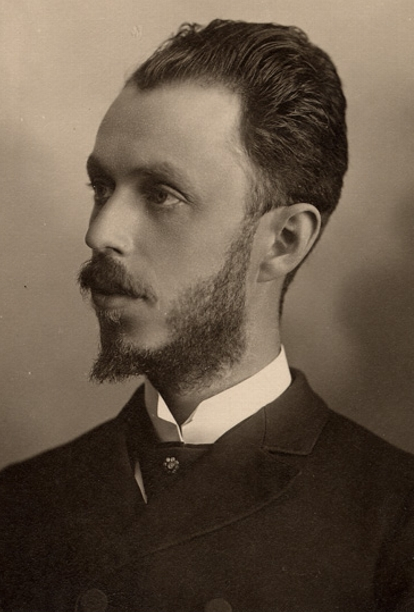

Member of the Legislative Council of Quebec for Lauzon
- In office 1905–1910
- Preceded by: Nicodème Audet
- Succeeded by: Eugène Roberge

Personal details
- Born: June 22, 1862 Lévis, Canada East
- Died: December 15, 1930 (aged 68) Montreal, Quebec
- Party: Liberal

Blaise-Ferdinand Letellier, KC (June 22, 1862 – December 15, 1930) was a Canadian lawyer, politician, and judge.

Born in Lévis, Canada East, the son of Blaise Letellier and Émérentienne Lacombe. Letellier was educated at the Séminaire de Québec and Université Laval. He was called to the Quebec Bar in 1886 and was created a King's Counsel in 1903. He practised law in Quebec City. He was a defeated candidate for the Legislative Assembly of Quebec in the riding of Dorchester in 1900 and in Beauce in a 1902 by-election. He was appointed to the Legislative Council of Quebec for the division of Lauzon in 1905. A Liberal, he resigned in 1910 when he was appointed a judge.

He died in Montreal in 1930.
