= Joseph-Armand Nadeau =

Member of the National Assembly of Quebec for Dorchester
- In office 14 November 1962 – 20 October 1963
- Preceded by: Joseph-Damase Bégin
- Succeeded by: Francis O'Farrell

Personal details
- Born: 21 November 1928 Sainte-Rose-de-Watford, Quebec
- Died: 20 October 1963 (aged 34) Sainte-Rose-de-Watford, Quebec
- Party: Union Nationale

Joseph-Armand Nadeau (21 November 1928 – 20 October 1963) was a Quebec politician who served as a member of the National Assembly of Quebec from 1962 to 1963.

== Political career ==
Nadeau was elected in the 1962 Quebec general election but died in office one year later.

== family ==
He was married to Aline Jolin Nadeau (1937–2025).
