= Charles Allan Smart =

Canadian politician

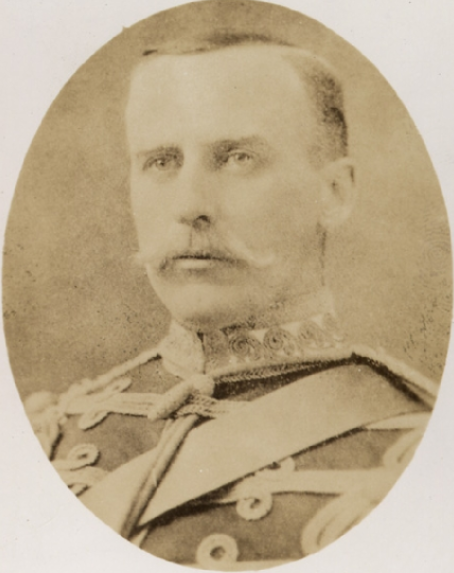

Member of the Legislative Assembly of Quebec for Westmount
- In office 1912–1936
- Preceded by: District created in 1912
- Succeeded by: William Ross Bulloch

Member of the Legislative Council of Quebec for Inkerman
- In office May 18, 1937 – June 4, 1937
- Preceded by: George Bryson, Jr.
- Succeeded by: Martin Fisher

Personal details
- Born: March 23, 1868 Montreal, Quebec
- Died: June 4, 1937 (aged 69) Westmount, Quebec
- Party: Conservative

Military service
- Branch/service: Canadian Militia
- Years of service: 1898-1919
- Rank: Brigadier General
- Unit: 6th Duke of Connaught's Royal Canadian Hussars
- Commands: 13th Scottish Light Dragoons; Eastern Townships Cavalry Brigade; 2nd Canadian Mounted Rifles Brigade; 15th Canadian Brigade
- Battles/wars: First World War

Charles Allan Smart CMG (March 23, 1868 – June 4, 1937) was a Canadian politician and a seven-term Member of the Legislative Assembly of Quebec.

== Early life ==
He was born in Montreal, Quebec, on March 23, 1868. The son of Robert Smart, a shoemaker, originally from Aberdeen, and his wife Margaret Clark, from Arbroath, he was educated at the High School of Montreal. In 1881, he left school and became a clerk for with Alexander Buntin and Co., a stationery firm. In 1884, he moved to Tellier, Rothwell and Co., oil dealers, where he stayed for seven years.

== City Councillor ==
Smart was a city councillor in Westmount in 1910.

== Member of the legislature/military career ==
He successfully ran as a Conservative candidate in the provincial district of Westmount in the 1912 election. He was re-elected in the 1916, 1919, 1923, 1927, 1931 and 1935 elections. He did not run for re-election in 1936.

== Legislative Councillor ==
Smart was appointed to the Legislative Council of Quebec in 1936, but the institution did not resume its activities until after he died.

== Death ==
He died on June 4, 1937.
