= Louis-Napoléon Larochelle =

Canadian politician

Louis-Napoléon LaRochelle
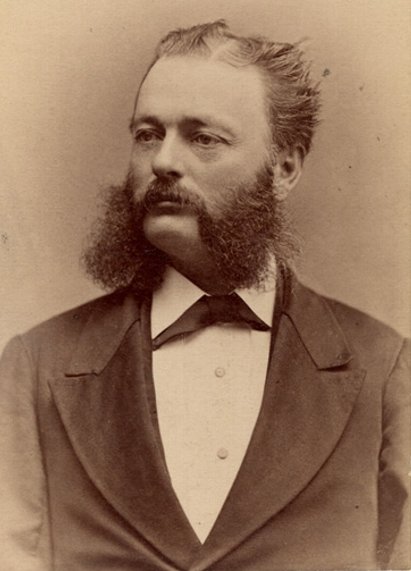

Member of the Legislative Assembly of Quebec for Dorchester
- In office 1871–1878
- Preceded by: Hector-Louis Langevin
- Succeeded by: Nicodème Audet
- In office 1886–1888
- Preceded by: Nicodème Audet
- Succeeded by: Louis-Philippe Pelletier

Member of the Legislative Council of Quebec for Lauzon
- In office 1888–1890
- Preceded by: Louis-Philippe Pelletier
- Succeeded by: Nicodème Audet

Personal details
- Born: November 14, 1834 Saint-Anselme, Lower Canada
- Died: October 27, 1890 (aged 55) Saint-Anselme, Quebec

Louis-Napoléon LaRochelle (November 14, 1834 – October 27, 1890) was a manufacturer, railway contractor and political figure in Quebec. He represented Dorchester in the Legislative Assembly of Quebec from 1871 to 1878 and from 1886 to 1888 as a Conservative.

He was born in Saint-Anselme, Lower Canada, the son of Siméon Gautron, dit Larochelle and Sophie Pomerleau. LaRochelle was educated at the Petit Séminaire de Québec. He took over the operation of his father's businesses when his father died in 1859. In 1876, he married Georgiana Plants. He served on the board of directors for the Levis and Kennebec Railway with Joseph-Godric Blanchet, Hector-Louis Langevin and Christian Pozer; he was later involved in a bitter and public dispute with Charles Armstrong Scott about who was to blame for the railway's financial failure. He was mayor of Saint-Anselme from 1870 to 1878 and from 1881 to 1889 and warden for Dorchester County from 1881 to 1886. He was defeated by Hector-Louis Langevin when he first ran for election to the Quebec assembly in 1867 but was successful in 1871. LaRochelle did not run in 1875 but lost to Nicodème Audet in 1881. Larochelle was elected again in 1886 but resigned his seat in 1888 to sit for Lauzon division in the Legislative Council of Quebec. He died in office at Saint-Anselme at the age of 55.
