= Jean-Charles Chapais =

Canadian Father of Confederation (1811–1885)

The Honourable Jean-Charles Chapais PC
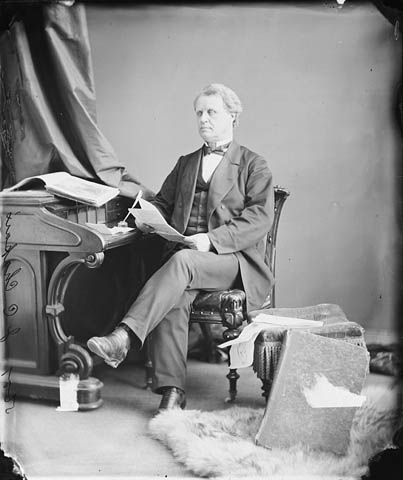
- Jean-Charles Chapais as Receiver-General, in 1870

Senator for De la Durantaye, Quebec
- In office January 30, 1868 – July 17, 1885
- Appointed by: John A. Macdonald
- Preceded by: Joseph-Noël Bossé
- Succeeded by: John Jones Ross

Member of the Legislative Assembly of Quebec for Champlain
- In office 1867–1871
- Preceded by: John Jones Ross
- Succeeded by: François-Xavier-Anselme Trudel

Personal details
- Born: December 2, 1811 Rivière-Ouelle, Lower Canada
- Died: July 17, 1885 (aged 73) Ottawa, Ontario
- Party: Conservative
- Other political affiliations: Conservative Party of Quebec (historical)
- Children: Thomas Chapais
- Cabinet: Minister of Agriculture (1867-1869); Receiver General (1869-1873)

Jean-Charles Chapais, PC (French pronunciation: [ʒɑ̃ ʃaʁl ʃapɛ]; December 2, 1811 – July 17, 1885) was a Canadian Conservative politician, and considered a Father of Canadian Confederation for his participation in the Quebec Conference to determine the form of Canada's government.

Chapais was born in Rivière-Ouelle, a small town in Kamouraska, Quebec, and was educated in Nicolet.

Following his success as a farmer and merchant, in 1845 he became the first mayor of Saint-Denis-de-la-Bouteillerie, the town he had lived in from 1833. The following year, he married Georgina Dionne; they had six children together.

== Political career ==
At the prompting of his father-in-law, Chapais entered regional politics. In 1851, he was elected for the first time to the Legislative Assembly of the Province of Canada; he was eventually to serve a total of five terms representing Kamouraska. A "bleu", he was a supporter of Augustin-Norbert Morin, Étienne-Paschal Taché and George-Étienne Cartier. He worked to abolish the system of seigneurial tenure in Quebec and reform agricultural legislation.

Following the Charlottetown Conference in September 1864, Chapais attended the Quebec Conference to negotiate on behalf of Canada East for provincial governments to have greater power in the Canadian federal system.

Chapais was Commissioner of Public Works in the Great Coalition of 1864–1867, and is credited with establishing the Intercolonial Railway and expanding the Grand Trunk Railway. In 1867 the British North America Act was passed, creating the Dominion of Canada, and Chapais became the first Minister of Agriculture. At this time, he also switched to representing Champlain in the Quebec legislature, due to a scandal over electoral irregularities in Kamouraska. On 30 January 1868, Jean-Charles Chapais entered the Senate of Canada, and sat in the body until his death.

As Minister, Chapais was in charge of more than simply agriculture: the department was also responsible for the import and export of animals, immigration, the census, patent administration and trademarks, public health, manufacturing, and the arts. After less than three years, he was replaced by Christopher Dunkin, which he greatly resented. His new position of Receiver General for Canada was significantly less prestigious and powerful, requiring little more than making and accepting payments on behalf of the government. (Today, the portfolio has passed to the Minister of Public Works.) Chapais resigned in 1873, saying that he wanted to spend more time with his family and business. He is buried in Saint-Denis-De La Bouteillerie, Quebec.

Chapais' house in Saint-Denis-De La Bouteillerie was designated a National Historic Site of Canada in 1962.

== Sources ==
- "Biography of Jean-Charles Chapais". Dictionnaire des parlementaires du Québec de 1792 à nos jours (in French). National Assembly of Quebec.
- Désilets, Andrée (1982). "Chapais, Jean-Charles". In Halpenny, Francess G. (ed.). Dictionary of Canadian Biography. Vol. XI (1881–1890) (online ed.). University of Toronto Press.
- The Hon. Jean-Charles Chapais, P.C., Senator – Parliament of Canada biography
- Biography Libraries and Collections Canada
- Biography from the Ministry of Agriculture

Political offices
Preceded by Edward Kenny	Receiver General; 1869-11-16 – 1873-01-29	Succeeded by Théodore Robitaille
