= Robert R. Ness =

Canadian politician

Member of the Legislative Council of Quebec for Inkerman
- In office January 14, 1942 – September 23, 1960
- Appointed by: Adélard Godbout
- Preceded by: Martin Fisher
- Succeeded by: George Carlyle Marler

Personal details
- Born: January 29, 1872 Howick, Quebec
- Died: October 21, 1960 (aged 88) Howick, Quebec
- Party: Liberal

Robert R. Ness (January 29, 1872 – October 21, 1960) was a Canadian politician and a breeder, importer and exporter of Ayrshire cattle.

Born in Howick, Quebec, Ness was Canada's largest importer and exporter of purebred cattle. In 1909, he was president of the Canadian Ayrshire Breeders Association. From 1923 to 1935, he was the Director of the Royal Agricultural Winter Fair.

He was appointed to the Legislative Council of Quebec for Inkerman on January 14, 1942. A Liberal, he was removed from office on September 23, 1960 due to absenteeism. In 1962, he was inducted into the Canadian Agricultural Hall of Fame.

He died in Howick in 1960.
