= Louis-Philippe Pelletier =

Canadian politician

The Honourable Louis-Philippe Pelletier PC
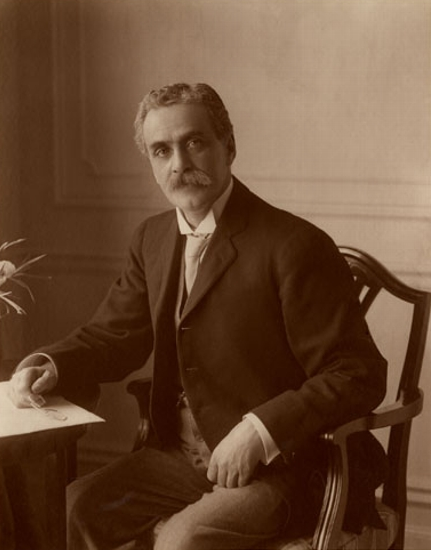

Member of the Canadian Parliament for Quebec County
- In office 1911–1914
- Preceded by: Joseph Pierre Turcotte
- Succeeded by: Thomas Chase Casgrain

Member of the Legislative Assembly of Quebec for Dorchester
- In office 1888–1904
- Preceded by: Louis-Napoléon Larochelle
- Succeeded by: Alfred Morisset

Member of the Legislative Council of Quebec for Lauzon
- In office 11 May 1888 – 22 October 1888
- Preceded by: George Couture
- Succeeded by: Louis-Napoléon Larochelle

Personal details
- Born: 1 February 1857 Trois-Pistoles, Lower Canada
- Died: 8 February 1921 (aged 64) Quebec City, Quebec, Canada
- Party: Conservative
- Other political affiliations: Conservative Party of Quebec
- Cabinet: Postmaster General (1911-1914); Attorney General (1896-1897); Provincial Secretary (1891-1896)

Louis-Philippe Pelletier, PC (1 February 1857 – 8 February 1921) was a Canadian politician, lawyer, journalist, newspaper owner, professor, and judge.

== Biography ==
=== Early life and family ===
Louis-Philippe Pelletier was born in Trois-Pistoles, Lower Canada, the son of Thomas-Philippe Pelletier and Caroline Casault, the sister of Louis-Napoléon Casault. He is the nephew of Canadian Chief Justice Louis-Jacques Casault.

Pelletier received his preliminary education at the Collège de Sainte-Anne-de-la-Pocatière at the age of 11. He then graduated Université Laval with a Bachelor of Arts in 1876, where he received the Prince of Wales gold medal at the same year. In 1877, he received a law degree in Laval and graduated with LL.L. He was awarded by The Marquess of Lorne with a gold medal in 1880.

=== Career in politics ===
He articled with Auguste-Réal Angers and was called to the Quebec Bar in 17 July 1880. After being defeated in the 1908 federal election, he was elected to the House of Commons of Canada for the riding of Quebec County in the 1911 election. A Conservative, he was the Postmaster General from 1911 to 1914. He resigned in October 1914 and was appointed a Superior Court judge for the district of Montreal. In August 1915 he was appointed to the Quebec Court of King’s Bench.

Prior to his entry to federal politics, Pelletier was also a member of the Legislative Assembly of Quebec after being elected in Dorchester as a Conservative in 1888 and retained his seat until 1904 when he did not seek another re-election. He attempted a return in 1908 but was defeated.
