= Ernest Ouellet =

Canadian politician

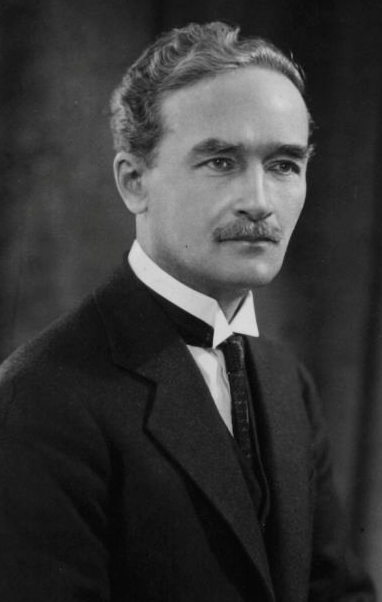

Member of the Legislative Council of Quebec for La Vallière
- In office 1930–1952
- Preceded by: Adélard Turgeon
- Succeeded by: Patrice Tardif

Member of the Legislative Assembly of Quebec for Dorchester
- In office 1917–1930
- Preceded by: Lucien Cannon
- Succeeded by: Joseph-Damase Bégin

Personal details
- Born: December 23, 1882 Sainte-Germaine-du-Lac-Etchemin, Quebec
- Died: January 4, 1952 (aged 69) Sainte-Germaine-du-Lac-Etchemin, Quebec
- Party: Liberal
- Spouse: Marie Ferland

Joseph-Charles-Ernest Ouellet (December 23, 1882 – January 4, 1952) was a farmer and political figure in Quebec. He represented Dorchester in the Legislative Assembly of Quebec from 1917 to 1930 as a Liberal.

He was born in Sainte-Germaine-du-Lac-Etchemin, Quebec, the son of Joseph-Sifroid Ouellet and Marie Laflamme. In 1905, he married Marie Ferland.

He was elected to the Legislative Assembly in a by-election on December 15, 1917. He was re-elected in 1919, 1923 and 1927. In 1929 he became a minister without portfolio in the cabinet of Louis-Alexandre Taschereau.

Ouellet resigned his seat in the Quebec assembly after he was named to the Legislative Council of Quebec for La Vallière division on November 27, 1930. He died in office in Sainte-Germaine-du-Lac-Etchemin and was buried in the local cemetery.

He was mayor of Sainte-Germaine-du-Lac-Etchemin from November 1933 to December 1935.
