= Charles-Étienne Chaussegros de Léry =

Charles-Étienne Chaussegros de Léry (September 30, 1774 – February 17, 1842) was a seigneur and political figure in Lower Canada.

He was born in the town of Quebec in 1774, the son of seigneur Gaspard-Joseph Chaussegros de Léry and Louise Martel de Brouague, the daughter of François Martel de Brouague. He apprenticed in law with Michel-Amable Berthelot Dartigny but then was hired as clerk assistant and assistant of the translator for the Legislative Council. In 1797, he became the translator for the council. He was named justice of the peace and also served as commissioner for various projects. He had inherited part of his father's seigneuries after his father's death in 1797 and acquired much of the remainder. In 1799, Chaussegros de Léry married Josephte, the daughter of judge John Fraser, a member of the Legislative Council. He served as deputy quartermaster general and deputy adjutant general in the militia during the War of 1812, becoming quartermaster general and then colonel for the militia of the town of Quebec.

He was named to the Executive Council in 1826 and to the Special Council that governed Lower Canada after the Lower Canada Rebellion in 1838.

He died at Quebec City in 1842.

His son Alexandre-René later served as member of the Canadian Senate and his son Charles-Joseph became mayor of Saint-François-de-la-Beauce and warden for Beauce County.
