= Martin Fisher =

Canadian politician

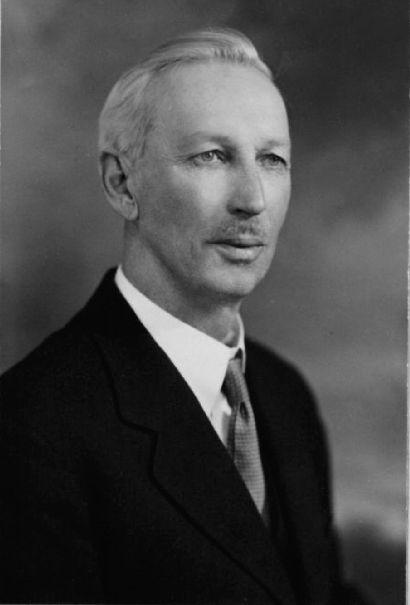

Member of the Legislative Assembly of Quebec for Huntingdon
- In office 1930–1939
- Preceded by: Andrew Philps
- Succeeded by: James Walker Ross

Member of the Legislative Council of Quebec for Inkerman
- In office 1939–1941
- Preceded by: Charles Allan Smart
- Succeeded by: Robert Ness

Personal details
- Born: Martin Beattie Fisher; January 2, 1881 Hemmingford, Quebec, Canada
- Died: December 17, 1941 (aged 60) Hemmingford, Quebec, Canada
- Party: Union Nationale

Martin Beattie Fisher (January 2, 1881 – December 17, 1941) was a Canadian politician. He was a Member of the provincial legislature in Quebec.

== Background ==
He was born in Hemmingford, Montérégie on January 2, 1881.

== Member of the legislature ==
He successfully ran as a Conservative candidate and won a by-election in 1930 in the district of Huntingdon. Fisher was re-elected in 1931, and 1935 and was re-elected as a Union Nationale candidate in 1936.

== Cabinet Member ==
He was appointed to the Cabinet in 1936 and served as Treasurer.

== Legislative Councillor ==
Not long before the 1939 election, Fisher was appointed to the Legislative Council of Quebec by Premier of Quebec Maurice Duplessis and served in that function until his death. He represented the division of Inkerman.

== Death ==
He died on December 17, 1941.
