= Charles Fitzpatrick =

20th-century Chief Justice of Canada and Lieutenant Governor of Quebec

The Right Honourable Sir Charles Fitzpatrick PC GCMG
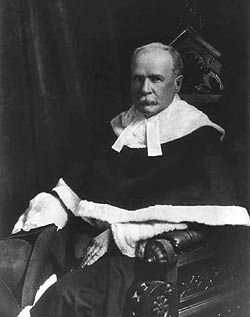

5th Chief Justice of Canada
- In office June 4, 1906 – October 21, 1918
- Nominated by: Wilfrid Laurier
- Preceded by: Henri Elzéar Taschereau
- Succeeded by: Louis Henry Davies

12th Lieutenant Governor of Quebec
- In office October 23, 1918 – October 31, 1923
- Monarch: George V
- Governors General: The Duke of Devonshire; The Lord Byng of Vimy
- Premier: Lomer Gouin; Louis-Alexandre Taschereau
- Preceded by: Pierre-Évariste Leblanc
- Succeeded by: Louis-Philippe Brodeur

MP for Quebec County
- In office August 19, 1896 – June 3, 1906
- Preceded by: Jules Joseph Taschereau Frémont
- Succeeded by: Lorenzo Robitaille

Minister of Justice and Attorney General of Canada
- In office February 11, 1902 – June 3, 1906
- Preceded by: David Mills
- Succeeded by: Allen Bristol Aylesworth

Solicitor General of Canada
- In office July 13, 1896 – February 9, 1902
- Preceded by: Charles Hibbert Tupper
- Succeeded by: Henry George Carroll

MLA for Québec-Comté
- In office June 17, 1890 – June 11, 1896
- Preceded by: Thomas Chase-Casgrain
- Succeeded by: Némèse Garneau

Personal details
- Born: December 19, 1851 Quebec City, Canada East
- Died: June 17, 1942 (aged 90) Quebec City, Quebec
- Resting place: Cimetière Saint-Michel de Sillery
- Party: Quebec Liberal Party (1890–1896); Liberal Party of Canada (1896–1906)

Sir Charles Fitzpatrick, GCMG PC (December 19, 1851 – June 17, 1942) was a Canadian lawyer and politician who served as Minister of Justice of Canada, as Chief Justice of Canada and then as Lieutenant Governor of Quebec.

== Early life ==
Charles Fitzpatrick was born on December 19, 1851, in Quebec City, Canada East, the son of John Fitzpatrick, a lumber merchant, and Mary Connolly. He was educated at Collège de Sainte-Anne-de-la-Pocatière, and later Laval University, where he earned a Bachelor of Arts degree in 1873 and a Bachelor of Laws degree in 1876, graduating with the Dufferin Silver Medal. Called to the Quebec bar that same year, Fitzpatrick established his practice in Quebec City, partnering with Simon-Napoleon Parent, Louis-Alexandre Taschereau and Lawrence Arthur Cannon; eventually founded the law firm of Fitzpatrick & Taschereau.

Throughout his legal career, Fitzpatrick worked as both Crown counsel and defence lawyer, representing several high-profile clients. In 1885, he served as chief counsel for Louis Riel during his trial for leading the North-West Rebellion. Riel was convicted and sentenced to death. Fitzpatrick later represented Thomas McGreevy, who was expelled from the House of Commons for corruption in 1891 and subsequently convicted of defrauding the government, serving a one-year prison term. In 1893, Fitzpatrick defended former Quebec premier Honoré Mercier, who had been dismissed by Lieutenant Governor Auguste-Réal Angers following allegations of public fund misappropriation; Mercier was ultimately acquitted later that year. Fitzpatrick also taught criminal law at Laval University.

== Political life ==
Fitzpatrick entered provincial politics in 1890, winning election to the Quebec Legislative Assembly for Québec-Comté as a member of the Quebec Liberal Party. He declined an offer to serve as Attorney General in the Charles Boucher de Boucherville cabinet in 1891. Acclaimed in the 1892 provincial election, he resigned from the legislature in June 1896 to pursue a career in federal politics.

In recognition of his growing reputation at the bar, Fitzpatrick was appointed Queen's Counsel in 1893. He was a delegate to the National Convention of the Irish in 1896, and that same year was admitted to the Bar of the Province of Ontario. From 1897 to 1899, he served as bâtonnier of both the Bar of Quebec and the Bar of the Province of Quebec. In 1896, he also published The Schools of Manitoba: Question of the Day under a pseudonym.

In the 1896 federal election, Fitzpatrick was elected to the House of Commons for Quebec County as a Liberal, securing 65 percent of the vote. He was re-elected with strong majorities in 1900 and 1904. Prime Minister Wilfrid Laurier appointed him Solicitor General of Canada in 1896, a position he held until 1902. At this time, Solicitor General was not a cabinet level role. In this capacity, Fitzpatrick supported several reforms to strengthen the Supreme Court of Canada. He was receptive to Chief Justice Samuel Henry Strong's request for additional funding to enable attendance at sittings of the Judicial Committee of the Privy Council, and he elevated the status of the Registrar of the Supreme Court to that of a deputy head within the federal civil service.

Laurier subsequently appointed Fitzpatrick Minister of Justice in 1902, serving until 1906. As Minister, he participated in the negotiations that led to the creation of the provinces of Alberta and Saskatchewan in 1905, representing the federal government in those discussions.

== Chief Justice of the Supreme Court of Canada ==
On June 4, 1906, Prime Minister Wilfrid Laurier appointed Fitzpatrick the 5th Chief Justice of Canada after the retirement of Henri Elzéar Taschereau on May 2, 1906. Personally, Fitzpatrick sought a role on the Supreme Court as early as 1904, but Prime Minister Laurier opposed his appointment, noting his importance to his Cabinet. With his appointment to Chief Justice, Fitzpatrick became the only person appointed directly to the role since the first Chief Justice William Buell Richards, and the only person appointed to the role appointed without any prior judicial experience.

Fitzpatrick and the Court took a narrow view of civil liberties. In Quong Wing v The King, the Court upheld a Saskatchewan law prohibiting white women from working for Chinese-Canadian men. In upholding the law, Fitzpatrick considered it similar to any other employment legislation, intended to "safeguard the bodily health, but also the morals of Canadian workers." (Note: Quong Wing v The King, 1914 CanLII 608, (1914) 49 SCR 440, Supreme Court (Canada))

Snell and Vaughan note that the retirement of Chief Justice Samuel Henry Strong in 1902 led to an improvement in the inter-personal relationships of the Court. Several of the Justices made efforts to create a cooperative atmosphere at the Court. Chief Justice Fitzpatrick's efforts were a main catalyst for this improvement. He secured a knighthood for the senior Puisne Justice Girouard. When conflicts did arise, justices were cooperative and the issues did not linger.

As Chief Justice, the Court made several changes to improve efficiency and administration for French language appeals. In 1907, to increase efficiency of the Court, the rules of the Court restricted the number of counsel that could be heard by each side of a case to two, and a maximum time of three hours for arguments. In 1908, a French stenographer was appointed to the Court staff. Additionally, Fitzpatrick made more frequent use of judicial conferences than his predecessors, and was known to consult Court staff members including his secretary and the Court Registrar on his draft decisions.

Fitzpatrick continued to participate in politics on the bench, giving private political advice to active politicians. Fitzpatrick lobbied the government to appoint Judge Cannon of Quebec to the Court upon the death of Justice Robert Sedgewick. Fitzpatrick had a personal debt to Prime Minister Wilfrid Laurier of $5,000. Fitzpatrick did not only provide political advice to the Liberal government, but also recommended Senate appointments, legislation and provided political advice on issues in Quebec to the Borden government. Snell and Vaughn note that Fitzpatrick acted as Prime Minister Borden's personal agent to the Quebec Conservative Party.

Fitzpatrick was appointed to the Imperial Privy Council in 1908, permitting him to sit as a member of the Judicial Committee of the Privy Council. His appointment was delayed as there was a maximum of two appointments, and former Chief Justice of Canada Samuel Henry Strong refused to resign despite no longer attending sessions. In 1909, Fitzpatrick was appointed as a British member of the Permanent Court of Arbitration in the Hague. He enjoyed the appointment and made a considerable effort to be reappointed in 1913. Fitzpatrick heard nine appeals as a member of the Privy Council, but did not write any reported opinions. Fitzpatrick lobbied Lord Haldane to deny leave to appeal from provincial superior courts directly. At the time, a litigant could appeal to the Supreme Court or the Privy Council, which was a common occurrence. Lord Haldane subsequently implemented a stricter regime for hearing appeals directly from provincial superior courts.

Fitzpatrick's time on the Privy Council included a scandal. In 1918, John Wesley Edwards, and later William Folger Nickle, raised concerns in Parliament about Fitzpatrick's use of a $2,500 allowance to cover travel costs to England, despite not attending any sittings. Edwards accused Fitzpatrick of "deliberately stealing from the treasury of the country and putting the money in...[his] own pockets" Fitzpatrick and Prime Minister Robert Borden responded that there was no legal issue and that Fitzpatrick had acted in good faith. When Edwards revived the issue the following year, Fitzpatrick, by then Lieutenant Governor of Quebec, returned the allowance.

On October 21, 1918, Chief Justice Fitzpatrick unexpectedly resigned at the age of 66, citing his declining health. However, historians Snell and Vaughn note that Fitzpatrick lost interest in judicial work and was more interested in political issues, including growing alienation of French-Canadians following the Conscription Crisis. Prior to his resignation, Fitzpatrick wrote Prime Minister Robert Borden and Justice Minister Charles Doherty seeking the appointment as the Lieutenant Governor of Quebec, which was granted on October 23, 1918. Prime Minister Robert Borden appointed Louis Henry Davies of Prince Edward Island as Fitzpatrick's successor.

== Lieutenant Governor of Quebec ==
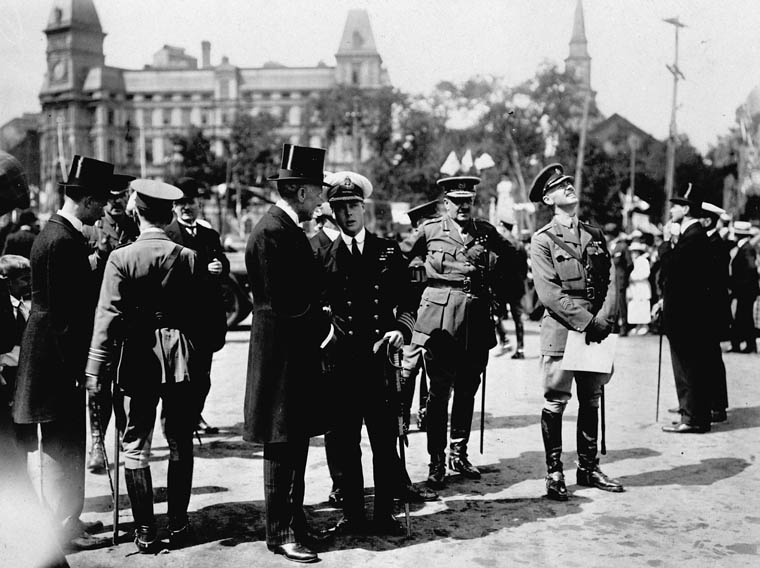
Fitzpatrick speaking with the Prince of Wales during his 1919 tour of Canada.

Fitzpatrick served as the 12th Lieutenant Governor of Quebec since Confederation until October 31, 1923.

Partway through his term as Lieutenant Governor, his wife's nephew (Louis-Alexandre Taschereau) became the Premier of Quebec.

== Personal life ==
On May 20, 1879, Fitzpatrick married Marie-Elmire-Corinne Caron. She was the daughter of René-Édouard Caron, 2nd Lieutenant Governor of Quebec, and his wife Marie-Joséphine De Blois.

Following tradition, Fitzpatrick as the Chief Justice was knighted in 1907. However, Fitzpatrick argued that a knight bachelorhood was insufficient and threatened to reject the appointment, so he was awarded the Order of St Michael and St George.

Fitzpatrick died on June 17, 1942, at the age of 90 years and 6 months. He is interred in Sillery, at Saint-Michel Cemetery (cimetière Saint-Michel de Sillery).

== Electoral record ==
1896 Canadian federal election: Quebec County
Party	Candidate	Votes
Liberal	Charles Fitzpatrick	1,982
Liberal	Jules-Joseph-Taschereau Frémont	1,058

By-election: On Mr. Fitzpatrick being appointed Solicitor General, 11 July 1896

By-election on 30 July 1896
Party	Candidate	Votes
Liberal	Charles Fitzpatrick	acclaimed

1900 Canadian federal election: Quebec County
Party	Candidate	Votes
Liberal	Charles Fitzpatrick	2,201
Conservative	L. A. Beaubien	911

1904 Canadian federal election: Quebec County
Party	Candidate	Votes
Liberal	Charles Fitzpatrick	2,445
Conservative	J. P. H. Pageot	271

== Archives ==
There is a Charles Fitzpatrick fonds at Library and Archives Canada.
