= Gérald Martineau =

Canadian politician

Member of the Legislative Council of Quebec for des Laurentides
- In office 1946–1959
- Preceded by: Thomas Chapais
- Succeeded by: Antonio Auger

Member of the Legislative Council of Quebec for Lauzon
- In office 1959–1968
- Preceded by: Émile Moreau
- Succeeded by: Abolished in 1968.

Personal details
- Born: July 31, 1902 Quebec City, Quebec
- Died: May 18, 1968 (aged 65) Sainte-Foy, Quebec
- Party: Union Nationale

Gérald Martineau (July 31, 1902 – May 18, 1968) was a political boss in Quebec, Canada.

== Background ==
He was born on July 31, 1902, in Quebec City and was a business person.

== Political career ==
From the 1944 provincial election to the 1960 election, Martineau was the treasurer of the Union Nationale.

He was appointed to the Legislative Council of Quebec in 1946, representing the division of Les Laurentides until 1959 and the division of Lauzon from 1959 to 1967.

Martineau appeared before the Salvas Commission of Inquiry and was convicted on eight counts of fraud in 1967.

== Death ==
He died on May 18, 1968.
