= Thomas Chapais =

Canadian politician

The Honourable Sir Thomas Chapais FRSC
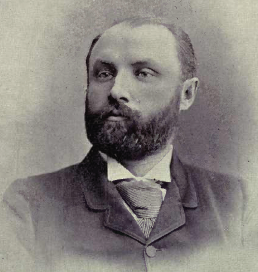
- Chapais in the 1890s

Canadian Senator from Grandville
- In office December 31, 1919 – July 15, 1946
- Appointed by: Robert Borden
- Preceded by: Philippe-Auguste Choquette
- Succeeded by: Paul Henri Bouffard

Member of the Legislative Council of Quebec for Les Laurentides
- In office March 18, 1892 – July 15, 1946
- Preceded by: Guillaume Bresse
- Succeeded by: Gérald Martineau

Personal details
- Born: Joseph Amable Thomas Chapais; March 23, 1858 Saint-Denis, Canada East
- Died: July 15, 1946 (aged 88) Saint-Denis, Quebec, Canada
- Party: Federal: Conservative; Provincial: Conservative
- Spouse: Henriette-Georgina Dionne
- Relations: Jean-Charles Chapais, father
- Cabinet: Provincial: Minister Without Portfolio (1893-1896 & 1936–1939 & 1944–1946); Commissioner of Colonization and Mines (1897)
- Portfolio: Provincial: Government Leader in the Legislative Council (1893–1894 & 1936–1939 & 1944–1946); President of the Legislative Council (1895–1897)

Sir Joseph Amable Thomas Chapais, FRSC (French pronunciation: [ʒozɛf amabl tɔma ʃapɛ]; March 23, 1858 – July 15, 1946) was a French Canadian author, editor, historian, journalist, professor, and politician.

== Life and career ==
Born in Saint-Denis, Quebec (then Canada East), the son of Jean-Charles Chapais, a Father of Canadian Confederation, and Henriette-Georgina Dionne, he received a bachelor's degree in 1876 from Université Laval and was called to the Bar of Quebec in 1879.

From 1879 to 1884, he was the principal secretary to the Lieutenant Governor of Quebec, Théodore Robitaille. Turning to journalism, he became the editor-in-chief of the daily newspaper, Le Courrier du Canada in 1884 and from 1890 to 1901 was the owner. From 1907 to 1934, he was a professor of history at Université Laval.

In 1891, he ran unsuccessfully as a Conservative for the House of Commons of Canada in the riding of Kamouraska. He was appointed to the Legislative Council of Quebec in 1892 representing Laurentides. From 1893 to 1894, he was the Leader of the Government. In 1893, he was appointed Minister without Portfolio in the cabinet of Louis-Olivier Taillon. From 1895 to 1897, he was the speaker of the legislative council. From 1896 to 1897, he was the president of the executive council in the cabinet of Edmund James Flynn and was a Cabinet Minister. In 1917, he refused a seat in the Senate but was summoned to the Senate in 1919. A Conservative, he represented the senatorial division of Grandville, Quebec and served until his death in 1946.

From 1936 to 1939 and again from 1944 to 1946, he was the leader of the government in the legislative council. From 1936 to 1938, he was a minister without portfolio in the cabinet of Maurice Duplessis. He was appointed again in 1944.

In 1912, he was made a fellow of the Royal Society of Canada and was its president from 1923 to 1924. From 1925 to 1926, he was the president of the Canadian Historical Association.

== Honours ==
He received the Royal Society of Canada's J. B. Tyrrell Historical Medal in 1928. In 1930, he was a member of the Canadian delegation to the League of Nations. In 1935, he was made a Knight Bachelor by George V.

Parc Thomas-Chapais in Montreal is named in his honour.

Chapais, Quebec is named for him.

== Published works ==
- Congrégations enseignantes et le brevet de capacité (1893)
- Discours et conférences (1895)
- le Serment du roi (1901)
- Jean Talon, intendant de la Nouvelle-France (1904)
- Mélanges de polémique et d'études religieuses, politiques et littéraires (1905)
- le Marquis de Montcalm (1911)
- Mélanges (1915)
- Cours d'histoire du Canada, 1760–1867 (1919)

== See also ==
- Université Laval

Professional and academic associations
Preceded by J. Playfair McMurrich	President of the Royal Society of Canada; 1923–1924	Succeeded by John C. McLennan
