= Alexandre-René Chaussegros de Léry =

Canadian politician

The Hon. Alexandre-René Chaussegros de Léry
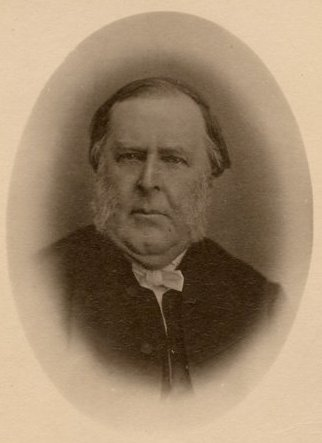

Senator for Lauzon, Quebec
- In office 1871–1876
- Appointed by: John A. Macdonald
- Preceded by: Elzéar-Henri Juchereau Duchesnay
- Succeeded by: Christian Pozer

Member of the Legislative Council of Quebec for Lauzon
- In office 1867–1880
- Succeeded by: George Couture

Personal details
- Born: March 26, 1818 Quebec City, Lower Canada
- Died: December 19, 1880 (aged 62) Quebec City, Quebec
- Party: Conservative
- Relations: Charles-Étienne Chaussegros de Léry, father

Alexandre-René Chaussegros de Léry (March 26, 1818 – December 19, 1880) was a Quebec seigneur, lawyer and political figure. He was a Conservative member of the Senate of Canada for Lauzon division from 1871 to 1876 and also represented the same division in the Legislative Council of Quebec from 1867 to 1880.

He was born at Quebec City in 1818, the son of seigneur Charles-Étienne Chaussegros de Léry, and studied at the Petit Séminaire of Quebec. He articled in law with Louis de Gonzague Baillairgé and was admitted to the bar in 1842. In 1844, he married Catherine Charlotte-Éliza, the daughter of seigneur Antoine-Gaspard Couillard. He inherited the seigneuries of Rigaud-Vaudreuil and Sainte-Barbe-de-la-Famine and also owned property at Quebec City and Saint-François-de-la-Beauce (now Beauceville, Quebec). After gold was discovered on his property, he set up the De Léry Gold Mining Company. He also took part in the founding of the Compagnie de Chemin de fer à Lisses de Lévis à Kennebec (later the Quebec Central Railway) and served as president.

He was named to the legislative council in 1867 and to the Senate in 1871, but resigned his seat in the Senate in 1876. He continued to be a member of the legislative council until his death in 1880 at Quebec. He was buried at Saint-François-de-la-Beauce.

His son William-Henri-Brouage later served as mayor of Saint-François-de-la-Beauce. His daughter Catherine-Louise-Josephte became the second wife of Richard Alleyn, a member of the Quebec legislative assembly. His brother Charles-Joseph was the mayor of Saint-François-de-la-Beauce and also served as warden for Beauce County.
