= Saint-Malachie =

- Parish municipality
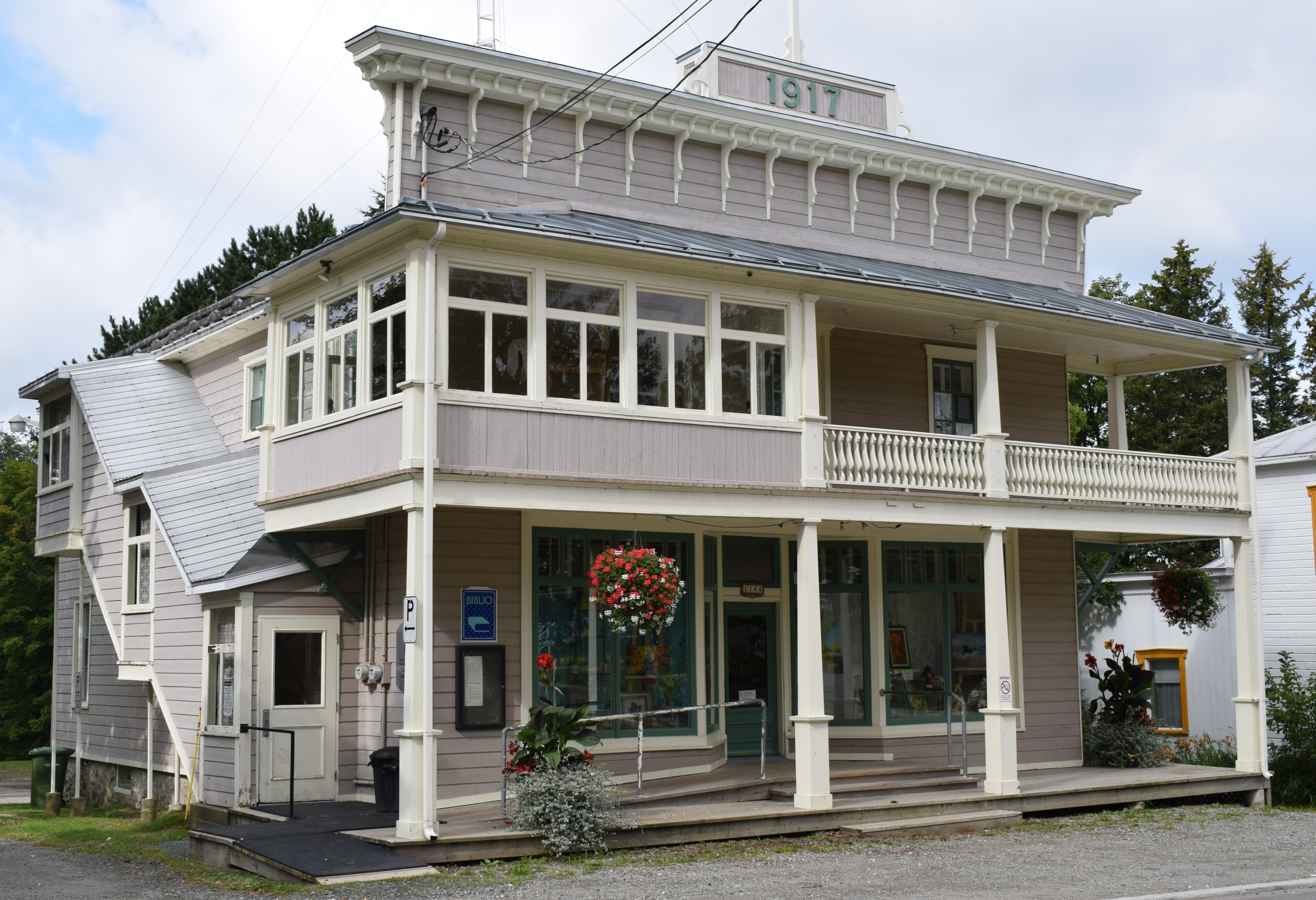
- J.-A. Kirouac municipal library

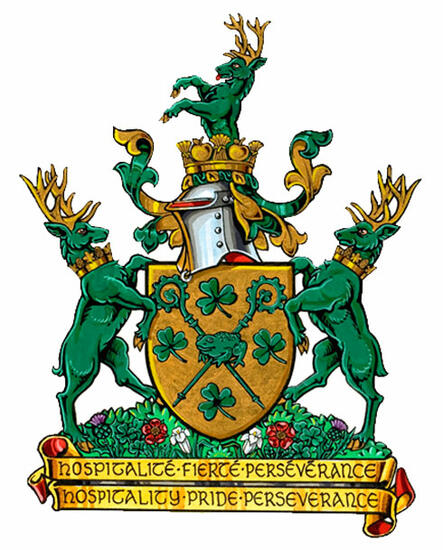
- Coat of arms
- Motto: Hospitality • Pride • Perseverance
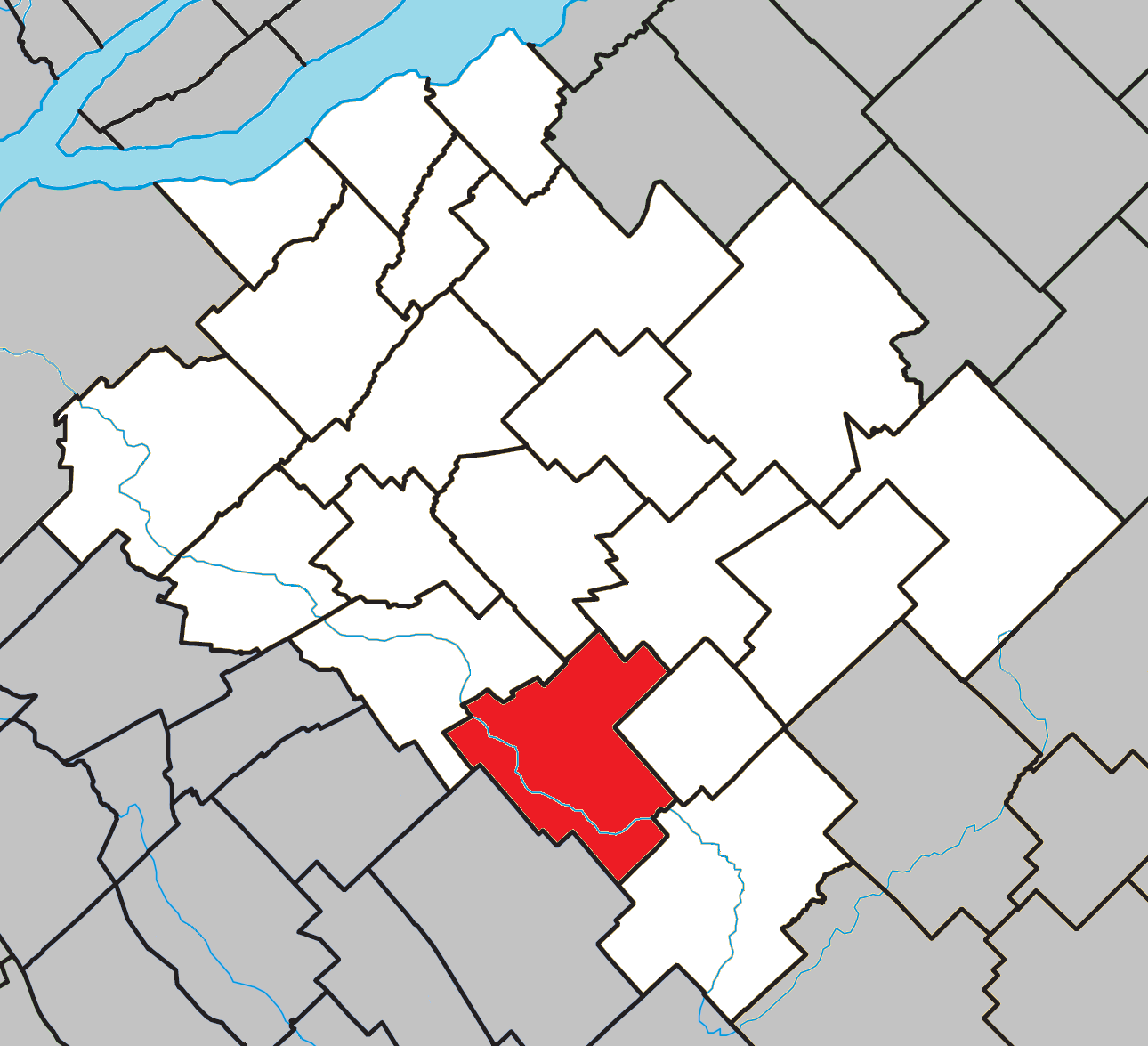
- Location within Bellechasse RCM.

- Location in province of Quebec.
- Coordinates: 46°32′N 70°46′W
- Country: Canada
- Province: Quebec
- Region: Chaudière-Appalaches
- RCM: Bellechasse
- Constituted: June 1, 1874

Government
  - Mayor: Bryan Dionne
  - Fed. riding: Bellechasse—Les Etchemins—Lévis
  - Prov. riding: Bellechasse

Area
  - Total: 103.20 km^{2} (39.85 sq mi)
  - Land: 100.61 km^{2} (38.85 sq mi)

Population (2011)
  - Total: 1,489
  - Density: 14.8/km^{2} (38/sq mi)
  - Pop 2006-2011: ▲5.8%
  - Dwellings: 800
- Time zone: UTC−5 (EST)
  - Summer (DST): UTC−4 (EDT)
- Postal code(s): G0R 3N0
- Area codes: 418 and 581
- Highways: R-216; R-277
- Website: www.st-malachie.qc.ca

Saint-Malachie (French pronunciation: [sɛ̃ malaʃi]) is a village located in the Bellechasse Regional County Municipality, in the Chaudière-Appalaches administrative region of Quebec, Canada. Situated along the Etchemin River in the Appalachian foothills, it was historically settled by Irish and Scottish immigrants in the early 19th century.

== History ==
After the War of 1812, lands in eastern Frampton Township along the Etchemin River were granted to several British soldiers. Many of these lands were later acquired by Gilbert Henderson (1785–1876), who became the area's principal landowner. The first settlers came mainly from County Armagh in Northern Ireland.

Saint Malachy (Máel Máedóc Ua Morgair) was a 12th-century Irish bishop who became Archbishop of Armagh; the connection to Armagh is why the name was chosen. The parish municipality was officially established in 1874, and would later give its name to the municipality of Saint-Malachie-de-Frampton before adopting its current name in 1948.

The 1873 toad infestation became a notable event in local history and is believed to have inspired the name La Crapaudière, derived from the French word crapaud ("toad"). The mountain, which formerly operated as a ski centre, is now a popular destination for hikers and cyclists.

Henderson Manor, a historical landmark, is located along the Etchemin River at the south end of the village.

=== Coat of arms ===
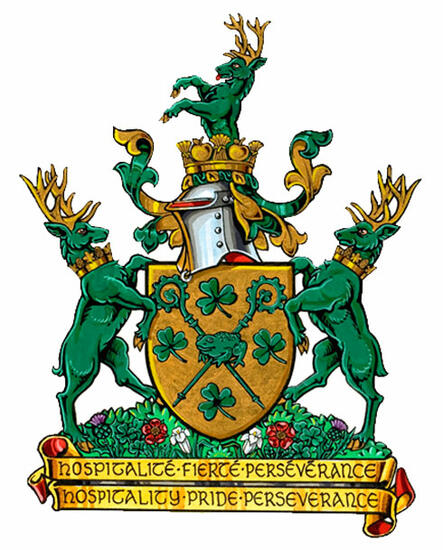
Saint-Malachie coat of arms

Yellow represents agriculture, Saint-Malachie's dominant industry; namely, the farming of poultry, dairy, beef, and pork products. Two croziers symbolize the municipality's namesake, Saint Malachy, a 12th-century Archbishop of Armagh. A toad, centered, calls back to the great infestation of 1873. Three white-tailed deer, which are omnipresent in the municipality's landscape, stand on a grassy mound set with lilies, roses, shamrocks, and thistles, wearing coronets adorned with maple leaves and fir cones. The thistles are a nod to the region's early Scottish landowners, while the shamrocks represent the Irish migrants who settled in the 19th century, whose legacy has left a lasting imprint on the local culture.

== Geography ==
Saint-Malachie is bordered by the South Etchemin River and Tough Creek. In season, it is a popular location for hunting and fishing, especially for speckled trout.

Saint-Malachie is also home to Mont Kinsella, a mountain peak which provides a panoramic view of the village.

The 27.3-kilometer footpath offers a scenic trail throughout Saint-Malachie. It runs along the forested areas and is equipped with resting areas in places where nature can be easily admired. The footpath is outfitted with informative plaques on local animal species and natural vegetation. Circulation is closed during the winter season and reopened in the spring.

=== Climate ===
Saint-Malachie has a humid continental climate with no dry season and a temperate summer (Dfb) according to the Köppen-Geiger classification. Over the year, the average temperature is 4.6 °C and precipitation averages 1030.6mm. Precipitation varies by 42.8mm between the driest and wettest months. The year-round temperature range is 30.2 °C.

The hottest temperature recorded in Saint-Malachie was 34 °C, on September 9, 2002, and the coldest was -38 °C, on January 16, 2009.

=== Geology ===
The bedrock consists mainly of northeast-trending, tightly folded and closely faulted sedimentary and volcanic formations of Cambro-Ordovician age.

== Demographics ==
In the 2021 Census of Population conducted by Statistics Canada, Saint-Malachie had a population of 1,667 living in 699 of its 812 total private dwellings, a 9.9% increase from its 2016 population of 1,517. With an area of 101.07 km^{2} (39.02 sq mi), population density in 2021 was of 16.5/km^{2} (42.7/sq mi).

== Community ==
In 2009, the non-profit Portage rehabilitation center for youth dealing with substance abuse issues was established in Saint-Malachie. The French-language residential program caters to adolescents and young adults aged 14 to 21.

=== Organisations ===
- Cultural committee, which organises the annual Festival Celtes et Cie, public market, and workshops; other committees oversee beautification and liturgy
- Cercle de Fermières de St-Malachie, local chapter of the Cercles de Fermières du Québec (CFQ)
- Chevaliers de Colomb de St-Malachie, local chapter of the Knights of Columbus
- Club de la FADOQ, national seniors' organisation
- Saint-Patrick Society, dedicated to preserving the village's Irish heritage and culture and organising annual St. Patrick's Day celebrations
- Parents-Secours, non-profit community organisation promoting the safety and protection of children and seniors
- IDEE St-Malachie, promotes industrial development and employment within the municipality
- L'Arche Le Printemps, offers a respite and accommodation service for people with intellectual disabilities

== Festival Celtes et Cie ==
The Festival Celtes et Cie is a three-day event held in the village every August celebrating the region's Celtic cultural heritage. Its musical programming notably features a mix of Irish, Scottish, and Québécois traditional genres.

== Notable people ==
- Major Joseph Phydime Lionel Gosselin (1911–1951), veteran of World War II and the Korean War
- Miville Couture (1916–1968), actor and radio host with Radio-Canada
- Francis O'Farrell (1919–1992), member of the National Assembly for the Liberal Party from 1964 to 1966 in Dorchester
- Paul-Henri Picard (1923–2002), member of the National Assembly for the Union nationale from 1966 to 1970 in Dorchester
- Glenn O'Farrell, C.M. (1958–), lawyer, broadcaster, and member of the Order of Canada
