= Guillaume Bresse =

Canadian politician

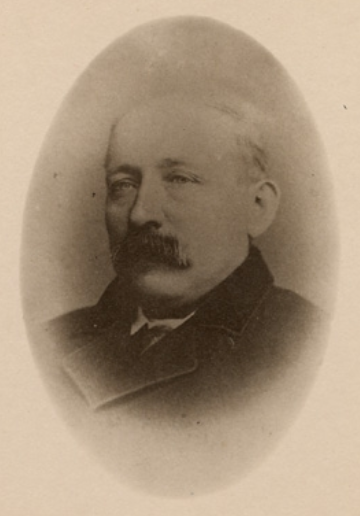

Member of the Legislative Council of Quebec for des Laurentides
- In office 1887–1892
- Preceded by: Jean-Élie Gingras
- Succeeded by: Thomas Chapais

Personal details
- Born: February 2, 1833 Saint-Mathias, Lower Canada
- Died: January 30, 1892 (aged 58) New York City, New York
- Party: Quebec Liberal Party

Guillaume Bresse (February 2, 1833 – January 30, 1892) was a Canadian shoe manufacturer and politician.

== Early life ==
Guillaume Bresse was born on February 2, 1833, at Saint-Mathias, Lower Canada to father Charles Bresse, a farmer, and mother Marie Rocheleau. The Bresse family constituted the two parents, Guillaume, two brothers, and three sisters. Guillaume attended primary school in the parish of St. Athanasius before leaving to work as a factory worker in Montreal. It is believed that Bresse learned of the shoemaking trade whilst living in Massachusetts after emigrating there with large numbers of other Canadians. In 1863, Bresse had lived in Quebec City for three years and started a shoe repair shop, Côté and Bresse, with two workmates from Massachusetts. In 1866, the Côté-Bresse partnership split up, and Bresse set up his own business elsewhere in Quebec City. After moving twice more, he spent $11,304 on a brick and stone factory which was to house his mechanized shoe manufacturing operation. His $165,000 per year revenue aided him in riding out the economic depression of the 1870s, and by 1889 Bresse controlled between $300,000 and $400,000 worth of assets.

== Roaring success ==
Bresse's success allowed him to use his wealth to support other non-competitive companies, and as such, loans from Guillaume Bresse were not uncommon during the 1880s. The construction of a $12,000 leather dressing factory in Quebec City was made possible by Bresse's financing. He was also involved in many philanthropic endeavours. The St. Roch and St. Anthony Hospice libraries were financed by the shoe manufacturer. During the 1880s, Bresse even joined a syndicate which bought a section of railway from the provincial government and sold it to the Canadian Pacific Railway Company, earning substantial profits.

Guillaume Bresse also made forays into the world of politics. From 1876 to 1878, he served as an alderman on the municipal council of Quebec City, and in December 1887 was appointed to the Legislative Council of Quebec, due to his connections with Premier Honoré Mercier.

When Bresse died from yellow fever in 1892, his assets totaled $262,275.
