= Gaspard-Joseph Chaussegros de Léry (1721–1797) =

Canadian politician (1721–1797)

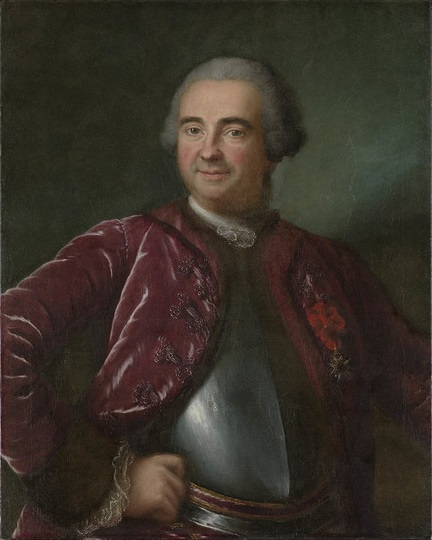
- Portrait of Gaspard-Joseph Chaussegros de Léry
- Born: July 20, 1721; Quebec, New France
- Died: December 11, 1797 (aged 76); Quebec, Lower Canada
- Occupations: military engineer and political figure in Lower Canada
- Children: Charles-Étienne Chaussegros de Léry

Gaspard-Joseph Chaussegros de Léry (July 20, 1721 – December 11, 1797), his first name was also sometimes written Joseph-Gaspard. He was a military engineer and a political figure in Lower Canada, who also worked as an engineer, architect, and urban planner in Quebec. One of his most significant contributions to Quebec City was his creation of the fortified wall of the Upper Town, which he developed in 1716 and supervised the construction of in 1745.

During the Seven Years' War he proved himself to be an outstanding officer and was one of only a few colonial officers held in high esteem by the Marquis de Montcalm.

In recognition of his military service, in 1759 he was made a Chevalier (Knight) of the Order of Saint Louis. In 1763, after the British Conquest of New France, he and his wife, Louise Martel de Brouage, were the first French Canadian couple to be presented to the English Court, drawing the compliment from King George III that if all Canadian ladies resembled Mme de Léry, then he had "indeed made a conquest".

== Early life ==
Born in Quebec City in 1721, Chaussegros was the son of Gaspard-Joseph Chaussegros de Léry and his wife Marie-Renée, daughter of Captain René Legardeur de Beauvais (1660–1742), holder of the Grand Cross of the Order of Saint-Louis. His father served as an engineer for the French in Quebec.

== Military life in New France ==
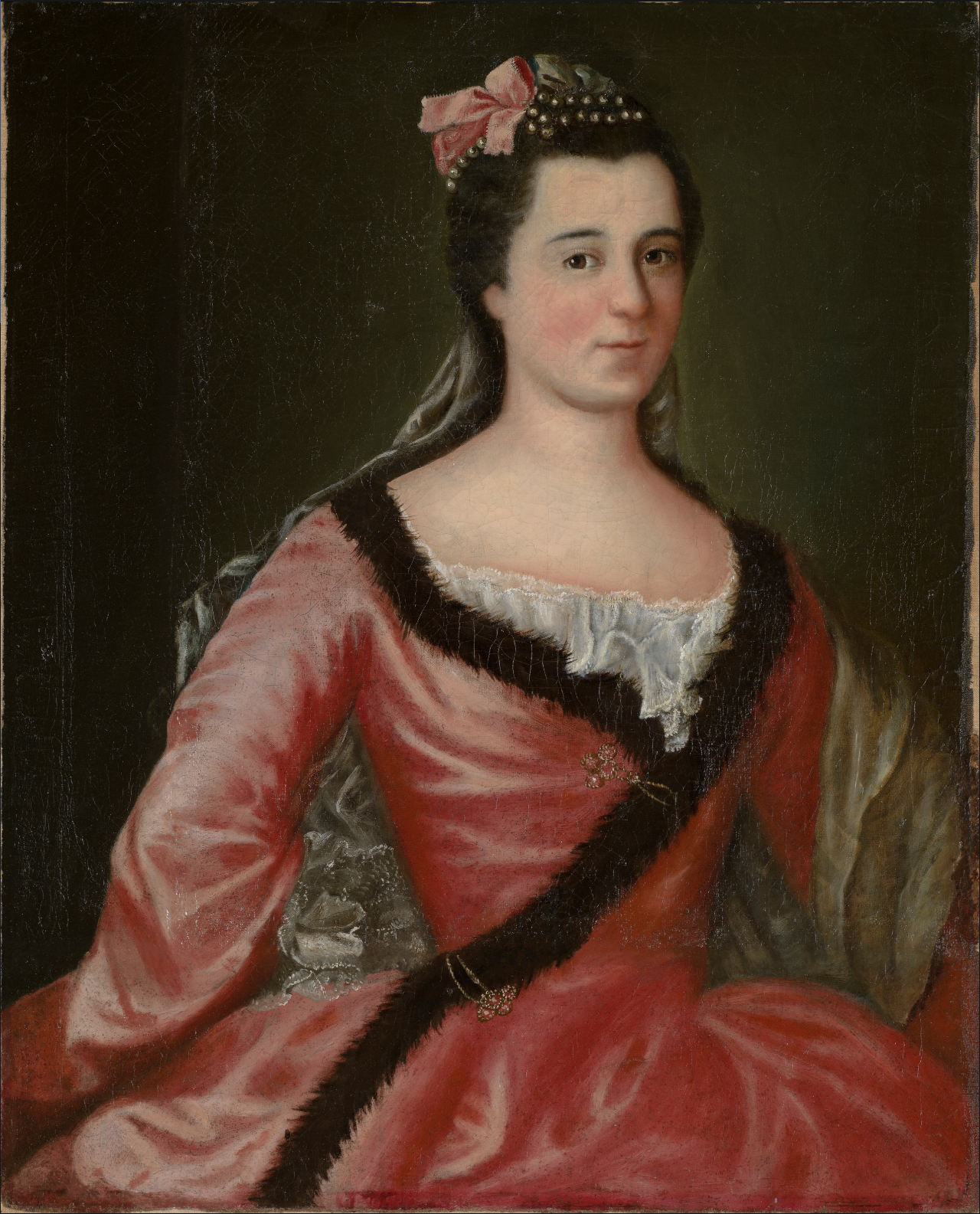
Mme de Léry

He joined the Troupes de la Marine in 1733 and became an assistant engineer in 1739. Chaussegros took part in raids against the British in New England, helped maintain French fortifications in New France and was in charge of the construction of Fort Saint-Jean. In 1753, he married Louise, the daughter of François Martel de Brouague, commandant of the Coast of Labrador. He took part in Louis-Joseph de Montcalm's capture of Fort Oswego in 1756 and, in 1757, was promoted to captain for his success at the Battle of Fort Bull. He was wounded at the Battle of the Plains of Abraham and sent back to France in 1761. His campaign journals are held by a government library in Quebec, and are important historic resources. In France he had become the seigneur of Léry after his father's death.

At some point, Chaussegros de Léry produced a finished copy of a map of the west. The original work had been made by Christopher Dufrost de La Jemeraye, a nephew of Pierre Gaultier de Varennes et de La Vérendrye.

== Civil life in the Province of Quebec ==
Chaussegros de Léry was not given any opportunities by the French. He returned to Quebec in 1764 by way of England. There he was named chief road commissioner by Governor Guy Carleton in 1768, and also served on the Legislative Council and Executive Council of Quebec. In 1792, he was named to the Legislative Council of Lower Canada. He sold the seigneury of Léry in 1766 but later he acquired the seigneuries of Perthuis, Rigaud-Vaudreuil, Gentilly, Le Gardeur and Sainte-Barbe.

He died at Quebec in 1797.

== Honours ==
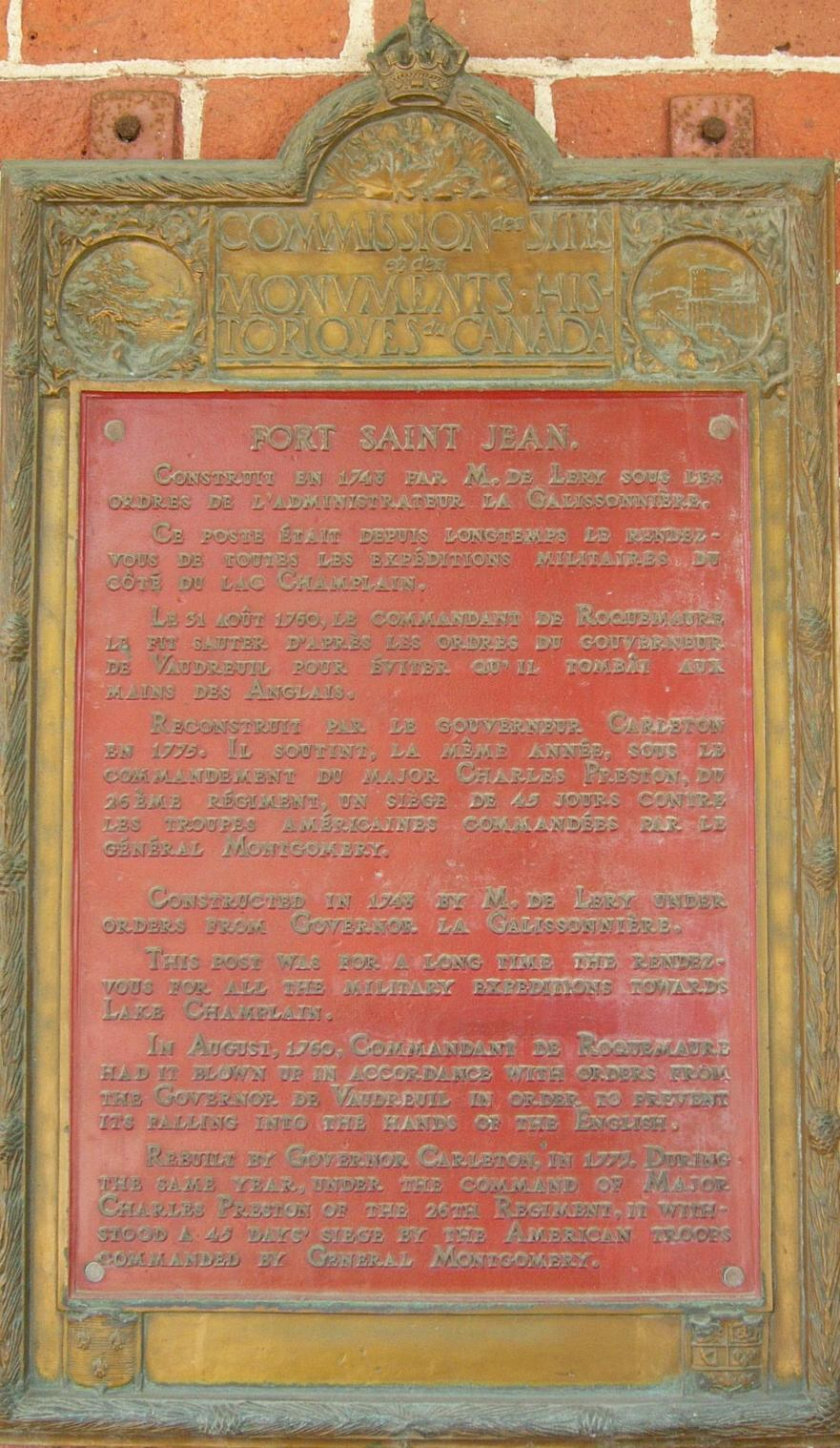
Fort Saint-Jean plaque

- A Fort Saint-Jean plaque erected by Historic Sites and Monuments Board of Canada in 1926 at the Royal Military College Saint-Jean mentions de Léry. "Constructed in 1748 by M. de Léry under orders from Governor la Galissonnière. For a long time, this post was a rendezvous for all the military expeditions towards Lake Champlain..."
- The DeLery Building at the Royal Military College Saint-Jean was named in his honour.
- Eight of his campaign journals from the French and Indian War are held by Laval University in Quebec.
- The portage across Marblehead Peninsula between Sandusky Bay and Lake Erie is named DeLery Portage because of his documentation of it in his 1754 journal.

== See also ==
- Jean-Baptiste Bédard (carpenter)
