= 2025 Quebec City municipal election =

Municipal election in Quebec, Canada

- November 2, 2025

21 seats in the Quebec City Council 11 seats needed for a majority
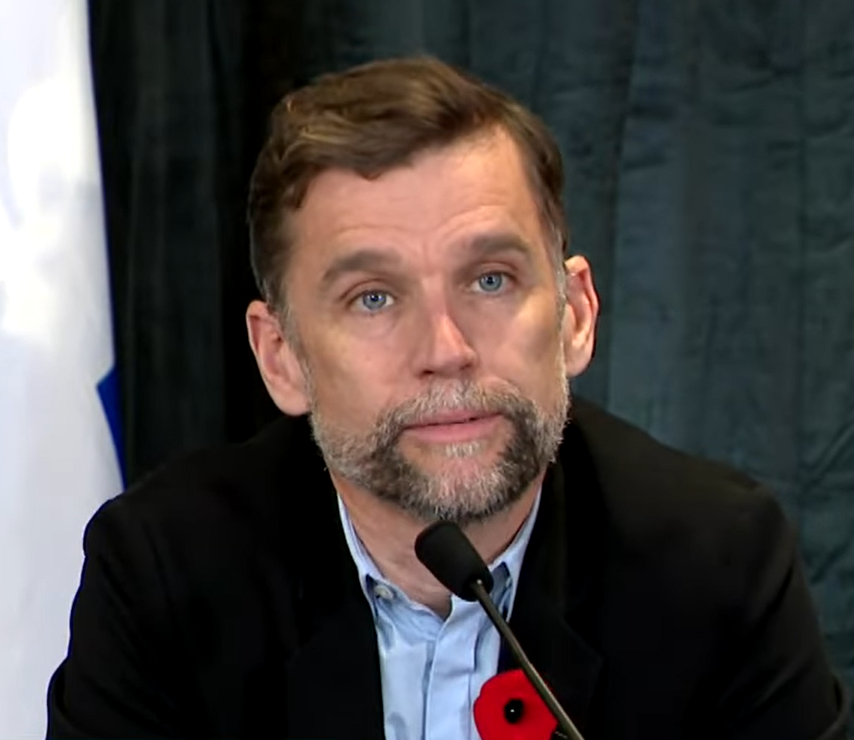

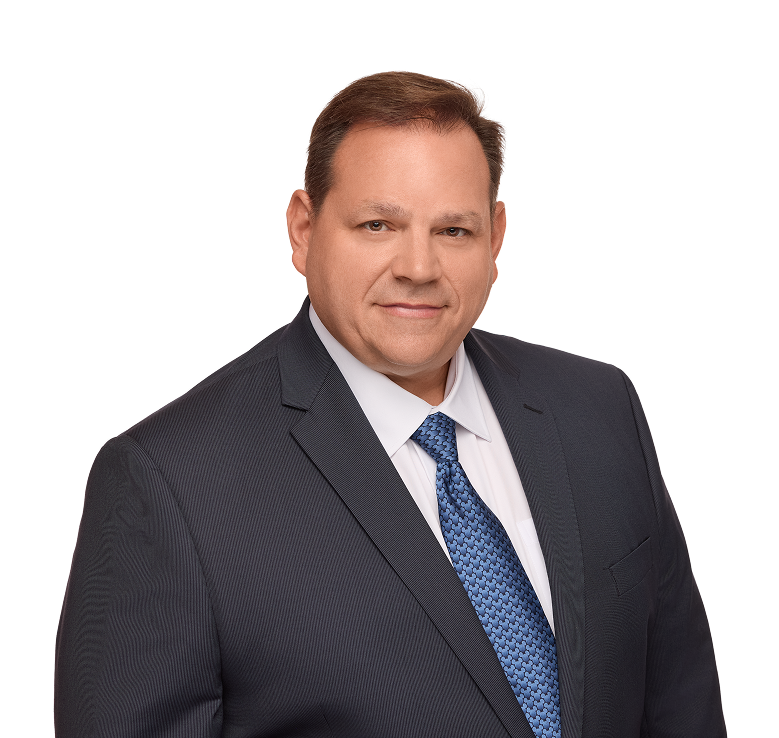

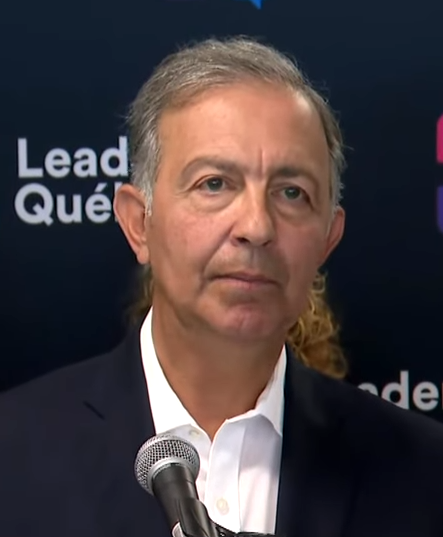

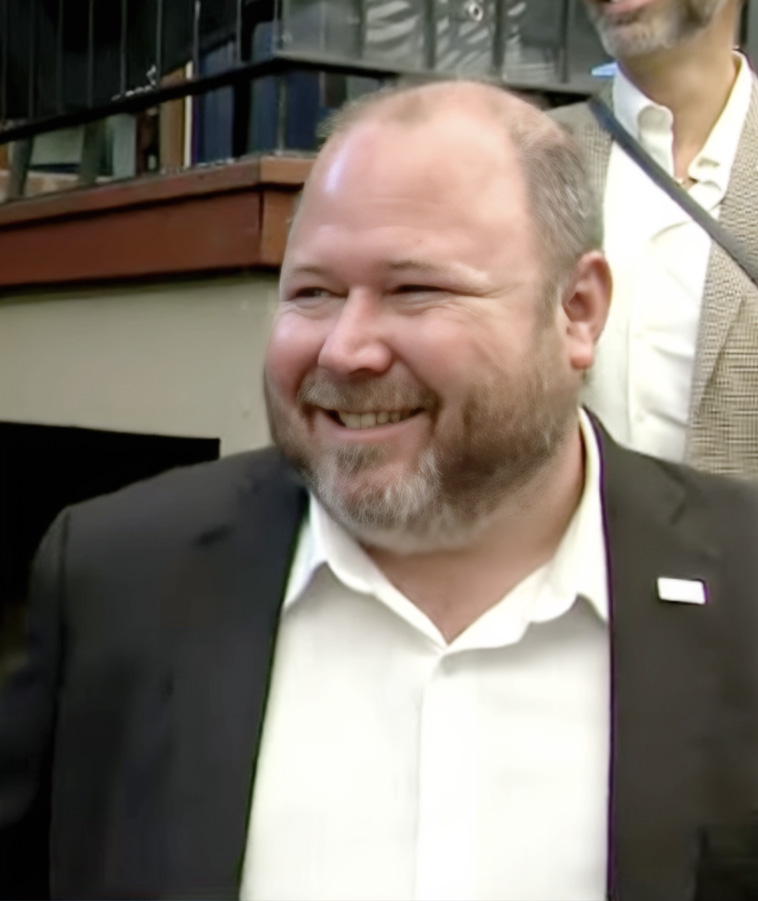
	First party	Second party
Leader	Bruno Marchand	Stéphane Lachance
Party	Québec forte et fière	Respect citoyens
Leader's seat	Vanier-Duberger	Val-Bélair
Last election	7	New Party
Seats before	11	1
Seats won	18	3
Seat change	▲7	▲2
Popular vote	104,646	48,844
Percentage	49.40%	23.06%
	Third party	Fourth party
Leader	Sam Hamad	Claude Villeneuve
Party	Leadership Québec	Québec d'abord
Leader's seat	Mayor	Maizerets-Lairet
Last election	New Party	10
Seats before	3	5
Seats won	0	0
Seat change	▼3	▼5
Popular vote	29,125	15,842
Percentage	13.75%	7.48%
- Council results
Mayor before election
Bruno Marchand
Elected mayor
Bruno Marchand

Municipal elections were held in Quebec City on November 2, 2025, the same day as elections in Montreal and other municipalities in the province.

== Background ==
Political changes in the city council seats between the beginning (above) and end (below) of the current council term

In the 2021 elections, mayoral candidates Bruno Marchand and Marie-Josée Savard were neck-and-neck, separated by only 739 votes. Although Marchand was elected mayor, his party Québec forte et fière only had a minority of seats on the city council. Four of the ten members of Marchand's first executive committee came from other parties.

During the 2021-2025 city council term, several changes took place with the city council seats. Nine members of the 21 seat council changed parties during the term. More specifically, Marchand's Québec forte et fière went from 6 to 11 councillors and became the majority party in the council following the additions of David Weiser, Steve Verret, and Claude Lavoie in 2022, with Bianca Dussault and Jean-François Gosselin joining the next year. These seat gains were at the expense of Québec d'abord (formerly Équipe Marie-Josée Savard), who went from 10 to 5 councillors, and Équipe Priorité Québec (formerly Québec 21) who went from 4 to 2 councillors, before completely disappearing in August 2025.

A new party, Leadership Québec was founded in April 2025. It entered the council only a few months before the elections thanks to the addition of two councillors originally elected under Québec d'abord. Leadership Québec absorbed what remained of Équipe Priorité Québec on August 13.

=== Councillors who changed parties ===
Between the 2021 and 2025 elections, several councillors changed parties:

Québec d'abord → Québec forte et fière

- Claude Lavoie (Saint-Rodrigue)
- Steeve Verret (Lac-Saint-Charles–Saint-Émile)
- David Weiser (Le Plateau)

Québec d'abord → Leadership Québec

- Louis Martin (Cap-Rouge–Laurentien)
- Isabelle Roy (Robert-Giffard)

Québec 21 → Indépendant → Québec forte et fière

- Bianca Dussault (Val-Bélair)
- Jean-François Gosselin (Sainte-Thérèse-de-Lisieux)

Québec 21 → Indépendant → Équipe priorité Québec → Leadership Québec

- Stevens Mélançon (Chute-Montmorency–Seigneurial)

Québec 21 → Équipe priorité Québec → Indépendant

- Éric Ralph Mercier (Les Monts)

=== Mayoral candidates ===
On January 12, 2024, incumbent mayor Bruno Marchand (Québec forte et fière) announced he would seek a second term in office. Council opposition leader Claude Villeneuve (Québec d'abord) announced his candidacy for mayor on January 22, 2025. On March 10, Stéphane Lachance, former provincial candidate for the Parti conservateur du Québec, became leader of Respect Citoyens, a party founded in 2023. After several months of speculation, Sam Hamad, former Member of the National Assembly for Louis-Hébert from 2003 to 2017, officially announced his candidacy on April 6 under the banner of Leadership Québec. Incumbent councillor for Limoilou and leader of Transition Québec Jackie Smith followed with her own announcement on May 10. Finally on June 11, former councillor Anne Guérette announced she would also be running for mayor. Two independent candidates with low media visibility also announced their candidacy: Claudine Martineau and Yves Laberge, the latter a sociologist opposed to the tramway project and the third link between Quebec and Levis.

=== Campaign ===
In June 2025, a poll revealed that 78% of the population was either very or somewhat interested in the election campaign. Six political parties would be participating in this election, half of which were new. All the parties presented candidates in all council districts, with the exception of Parti du monde which was only running in the mayoral seat. In addition to the independent candidates, the election campaign began with 8 candidates for mayor and 115 candidates for city council. Of that, 50 were women and 73 were men. One candidate in Montcalm—Saint-Sacrement withdrew from the race on October 7, denouncing a "toxic climate" on the campaign trail.

The first debate came on October 2 between Bruno Marchand and Sam Hamad on BLVD 102.1. This formula of "duels" between candidates was repeated by different media in the following days. A debate between the six party-affiliated candidates was organized by the Quebec City Chamber of Commerce at La salle Jean-Paul-Tardif on 7 October. A debate between five candidates was broadcast on Noovo on October 14.

== Mayoral election ==
2025 Quebec City municipal election
Party	Candidate	Votes	%
Québec forte et fière	Bruno Marchand	104,989	49.42
Respect citoyens	Stéphane Lachance	48,949	23.04
Leadership Québec	Sam Hamad	29,224	13.76
Québec d'abord	Claude Villeneuve	15,885	7.48
Transition Québec	Jackie Smith	8,759	4.12
Parti du monde	Anne Guérette	3,570	1.68
Independent	Claudine Martineau	545	0.26
Independent	Yves Laberge	512	0.24

== City council elections ==
=== La Cité-Limoilou ===
District	Candidates						Incumbent
District	Québec forte et fière	Québec d'abord	Leadership Québec	Transition Québec	Respect citoyens	Independent	Incumbent
Cap-aux-Diamants	Mélissa Coulombe-Leduc; 4,561 (57.91%)	Guy Boivin; 381 (4.84%)	Vicky Lépine; 626 (7.95%)	Micha Horswill; 1,744 (22.14%)	Arnaud Larue; 564 (7.16%)		Mélissa Coulombe-Leduc
Montcalm–Saint-Sacrement	Catherine Vallières-Roland; 7,005 (71.95%)	Félix Bouffard; 707 (7.26%)		Sandrine Hélie; 911 (9.36%)	Gabriel Richard-Brunet; 897 (9.21%)	Jean-François Arcand; 216 (2.22%)	Catherine Vallières-Roland
Saint-Roch–Saint-Sauveur	Elainie Lepage; 3,688 (43.74%)	Quentin Maridat; 530 (6.29%)	Pascale Houle; 572 (6.78%)	Marjorie Champagne; 2,173 (25.77%)	Mélanie Leroux; 1,109 (13.15%)	Patrick Kerr; 105 (1.25%)	Pierre-Luc Lachance
Saint-Roch–Saint-Sauveur	Elainie Lepage; 3,688 (43.74%)	Quentin Maridat; 530 (6.29%)	Pascale Houle; 572 (6.78%)	Marjorie Champagne; 2,173 (25.77%)	Mélanie Leroux; 1,109 (13.15%)	Napoleon Woo; 254 (3.01%)	Pierre-Luc Lachance
Limoilou	Raymond Poirier; 3,107 (43.15%)	Sébastien Morier; 409 (5.68%)	Véronique Thiboutot; 506 (7.03%)	Esperance Mfisimana; Co-candidate for Jackie Smith; 2,068 (28.72%)	Hippolyte Doua; 754 (10.47%)	Julien Cardinal; 356 (4.94%)	Jackie Smith
Maizerets–Lairet	Marylou Boulianne; 2,472 (40.06%)	Hélène Guillemette; Co-candidate for Claude Villeneuve; 1,062 (17.21%)	Eric Duguay; 584 (9.47%)	Martial Van Neste; 925 (14.99%)	Kevin Caron; 1,044 (16.92%)	Simon Tardif; 83 (1.35%)	Claude Villeneuve

=== Les Rivières ===
District	Candidates					Incumbent
District	Québec forte et fière	Québec d'abord	Leadership Québec	Transition Québec	Respect citoyens	Incumbent
Vanier–Duberger	Clément Bourdeau; Co-candidate for Bruno Marchand; 4,064 (41.72%)	Rosie-Anne Roussel Vallières; 1,065 (10.93%)	Hugo Langlois; 2,144 (22.01%)	Francis Fontaine; 351 (3.60%)	Eric Thiboutot; 2,116 (21.72%)	Alicia Despins
Neufchâtel–Lebourgneuf	Maxime Elmaleh; 5,106 (44.94%)	Alexandre Laforge; 1,326 (11.67%)	Emilie Robitaille; 1,962 (17.27%)	Lény Painchaud; 217 (1.91%)	Anik Lalancette; 2,750 (24.21%)	Patricia Boudreault-Bruyère
Les Saules–Les Méandres	Catherine Deschamps; 4,371 (43.52%)	Véronique Dallaire; 1,445 (14.39%)	Patrick Paquet; 1,567 (15.60%)	Pierre-Luc Faucher; 285 (2.84%)	Isabelle Dufour; 2,375 (23.65%)	Véronique Dallaire

=== Sainte-Foy–Sillery–Cap-Rouge ===
District	Candidates						Incumbent
District	Québec forte et fière	Québec d'abord	Leadership Québec	Transition Québec	Respect citoyens	Parti du monde	Incumbent
Saint-Louis–Sillery	Marianne White; 8,208 (68.12%)	André-Pier Bérubé; 723 (6.00%)	Jean-Stéphane Bernard; 1,539 (12.77%)	Raffaël Gilbert; 514 (4.27%)	François Labrecque; 1,066 (8.85%)		Maude Mercier Larouche
Le Plateau	Gabriel Dusablon; 4,990 (61.17%)	Moustapha Faye; 470 (5.76%)	Catherine Gagné; 1,208 (14.81%)	Félix L'Heureux-Bilodeau; 549 (6.73%)	Eugénie Tossea Epse Labonté; 940 (11.52%)		David Weiser
La Pointe-de-Sainte-Foy	Jean-Luc Lavoie; 6,767 (66.61%)	Fabio Tétu; 433 (4.26%)	Robert Fournier; 1,114 (10.97%)	Marie-Ève Martel; 524 (5.16%)	Éric Guay; 1,321 (13.00%)		Anne Corriveau
Cap-Rouge–Laurentien	Yannick Fauteux; 6,635 (52.81%)	Ana-Rose Paradis; 635 (5.05%)	Louis Martin; 2,418 (19.25%)	Andrée-Anne Tremblay; 372 (2.96%)	Philippe Moussette; 2,100 (16.72%)	Frédéric Imbeault; Co-candidate for Anne Guérette; 403 (3.21%)	Louis Martin

=== Charlesbourg ===
District	Candidates					Incumbent
District	Québec forte et fière	Québec d'abord	Leadership Québec	Transition Québec	Respect citoyens	Incumbent
Saint-Rodrigue	Claude Lavoie; 3,862 (43.18%)	David Audet; 1,009 (11.28%)	François Beaulé; 1,474 (16.48%)	Olivia Lavoie; 456 (5.10%)	Manès Webster; 2,143 (23.96%)	Claude Lavoie
Louis-XIV	Marie-Pierre Boucher; 5,965 (47.58%)	Pier-Luc St-Pierre Fortin; 1,116 (8.90%)	Donald Gagnon; 1,837 (14.65%)	Charles Lamont; 374 (2.98%)	Marie-Jo Bégin-Létourneau; 3,245 (25.88%)	Marie-Pierre Boucher
Les Monts	Raphaël Lebailly; 4,270 (35.45%)	Vincent Tremblay; 1,192 (9.90%)	Valérie Savard; 1,992 (16.54%)	Samuel Moisan-Domm; 488 (4.05%)	Éric Ralph Mercier; 4,102 (34.06%)	Éric Ralph Mercier

=== Beauport ===
District	Candidates						Incumbent
District	Québec forte et fière	Québec d'abord	Leadership Québec	Transition Québec	Respect citoyens	Independent	Incumbent
Sainte-Thérèse-de-Lisieux	Manouchka Blanchet; 3,441 (32.70%)	Doni Berberi; 781 (7.42%)	Justine Savard; 1,827 (17.36%)	Pier-Yves Champagne; 287 (2.73%)	Mélanie Sauvé; 4,079 (38.76%)	Patrice Fortin; 108 (1.03%)	Jean-François Gosselin
La Chute-Montmorency–Seigneurial	Elisa Verreault; 3,665 (33.37%)	Marie-Eve Leblond; 991 (9.02%)	Stevens Mélançon; 3,488 (31.76%)	Pedro-Natanaël Bordon-Richard; 262 (2.39%)	Joey Aubé; 2,427 (22.10%)	Mario Desjardins Pelchat; 83 (0.76%)	Stevens Mélançon
La Chute-Montmorency–Seigneurial	Elisa Verreault; 3,665 (33.37%)	Marie-Eve Leblond; 991 (9.02%)	Stevens Mélançon; 3,488 (31.76%)	Pedro-Natanaël Bordon-Richard; 262 (2.39%)	Joey Aubé; 2,427 (22.10%)	Dominic Tremblay; 67 (0.61%)	Stevens Mélançon
Robert-Giffard	Éric Courtemanche Baril; 3,975 (39.30%)	Sébastien Bouchard-Théberge; 899 (8.89%)	Isabelle Roy; 2,210 (21.85%)	Camille Lambert-Deubelbeiss; 501 (4.95%)	Benoit Bourdeau; 2,530 (25.01%)		Isabelle Roy

=== La Haute-Saint-Charles ===
District	Candidates						Incumbent
District	Québec forte et fière	Québec d'abord	Leadership Québec	Transition Québec	Respect citoyens	Independent	Incumbent
Lac-Saint-Charles–Saint-Émile	Konan Emma Amehoum; 2,621 (23.39%)	Sophie Gosselin; 1,532 (13.67%)	Jean Gagnon; 1,996 (17.82%)	Carl Gignac; 256 (2.28%)	Marc Roussin; 4,376 (39.06%)	Sophie Verret; 423 (3.78%)	Steeve Verret
Loretteville–Les Châtels	Marie-Josée Asselin; 5,280 (47.56%)	Sylvie Lefrançois; 729 (6.57%)	Jean Côté; 1,778 (16.02%)	Catherine Proulx; 332 (2.99%)	Anne-Laurence Harvey; 2,982 (26.86%)		Marie-Josée Asselin
Val-Bélair	Bianca Dussault; 3,04 (31.04%)	Kim Boyd; 576 (5.85%)	Mégy Gagné; 1,566 (15.91%)	Sarah Lesage; 217 (2.21%)	Pascal Morneau; Co-candidate for Stéphane Lachance; 4,427 (44.99%)		Bianca Dussault

== See also ==
- Quebec City Council
