= Québec d'abord =

Municipal political party in Quebec City

Québec d'abord (previously known as Équipe Labeaume) is a municipal political party in Quebec City.

Founded by Régis Labeaume, it was registered with Elections Quebec June 5, 2008. During the 2021 Quebec City municipal election, under a new leader, the party took the name Équipe Marie-Josée Savard. With the results of the 2021 election, the party became the official opposition and again changed its leadership. On February 21, 2022, the party changed its name to Québec d'abord.

== History ==
Régis Labeaume was elected Mayor of Quebec City the first time as an independent candidate during the 2007 municipal by-elections with 59% of the vote. Upon his arrival to the Quebec City Council, he formed an executive council with municipal councillors who were favourable to him. These alliances became a political party on June 5, 2008. During the 2009 Quebec municipal elections, Équipe Labeaume had 25 councillors elected out of a possible 27 seats, making it the only party sitting on the Council. During the 2013 and 2017 elections, new parties reduced the vote and seat share for the party. By June 2021, the party held 14 seats of a possible 21 on the council.

As the 2021 Quebec City municipal elections approached, Régis Labeaume announced that he was retiring from public life. On May 12, 2021, he endorsed Marie-Josée Savard, a member of his party and vice-president of the executive committee.. On May 20, 2021, Elections Québec officially registered the name change of the party from "Équipe Labeaume" to "Équipe Marie-Josée Savard".,. The party's headquarters remained at 840 rue Raoul-Jobin. All the municipal councillors for the party participated in the announcement for the change. Nevertheless, several councillors for the party took the opportunity to also leave political life, allowing for a renewal of the team. In the election, the party won the largest number of seats in the council (10 out of a possible 21), but leader Marie-Josée Savard was not elected mayor. New councillor Claude Villeneuve, former advisor to Premier Pauline Marois, was designated by his colleagues to succeed Savard on November 10, 2021. The party changed its name to better reflect the results of the election and identity, renaming itself "Québec d'abord" on February 21, 2022.

Weakened by the move from government to opposition, the party lost three councillors over the span of six months following the 2021 election. Steeve Verret, for Lac-Saint-Charles-Saint-Émile, left the party to sit as an independent less than ten days after the election, followed by David Weiser and Claude Lavoie in the spring. These moves changed the balance of power in the City Council, causing the ruling Québec forte et fière and the second opposition party Québec 21 to have a majority of seats in the council.

== Party leaders ==
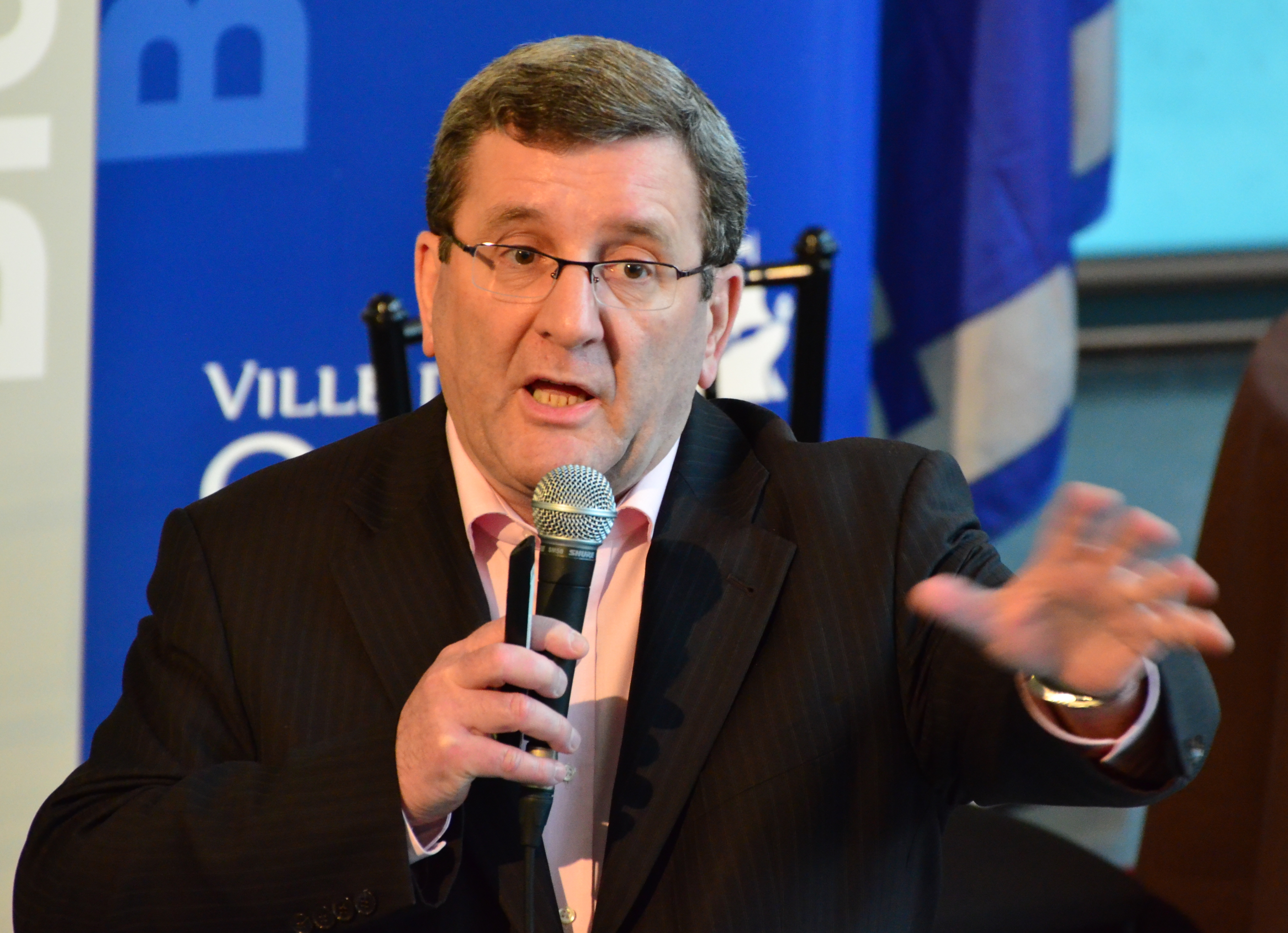
Régis Labeaume in 2011.

Party leaders
Name	Term start	Term completed
Régis Labeaume	June 5, 2008	May 12, 2021
Marie-Josée Savard	May 12, 2021	November 10, 2021
Claude Villeneuve	November 10, 2021	Present

== Election results ==
Résultats électoraux
Election	Leader	Mayor	Councillors	Slogan
2007 Municipal Elections	Régis Labeaume		0 / 37	L'action. La ville. L'avenir. Labeaume.
2009 Quebec municipal elections	Régis Labeaume		25 / 27	Équipe Labeaume
2013 Quebec municipal elections	Régis Labeaume		18 / 21	Pour une ville fière et forte
2017 Quebec municipal elections	Régis Labeaume		17 / 21	Réussir notre ville ensemble
2021 Quebec City municipal election	Marie-Josée Savard		10 / 21	Une ville à partager
2025 Quebec City municipal election	Claude Villeneuve		0 / 21	Près de vous
