= 2021 Quebec City municipal election =

Québec City municipal election

- November 7, 2021

22 seats in the Quebec City Council 12 seats needed for a majority
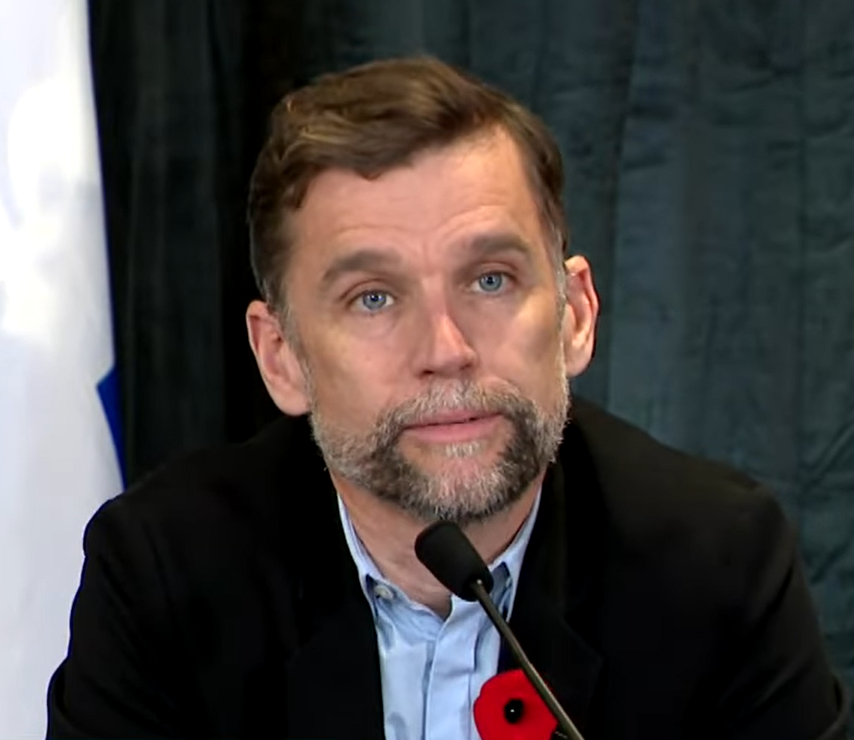

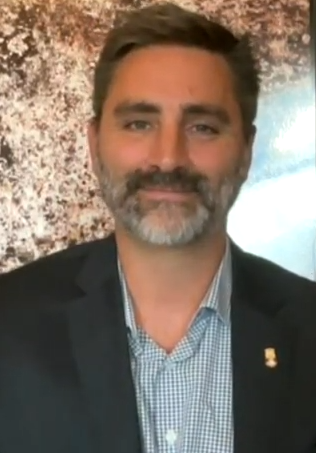
	First party	Second party
		EMJS
Leader	Bruno Marchand	Marie-Josée Savard
Party	Québec forte et fière	Équipe Marie-Josée Savard
Leader's seat	Montcalm-Saint-Sacrement	Mayor (lost)
Last election	New party	18 seats (as Équipe Labeaume)
Seats won	7	10
Seat change	▲7	▼8
Popular vote	59,580	58,746
Percentage	32.22%	31.86%
	Third party	Fourth party
		TQ
Leader	Jean-François Gosselin	Jackie Smith
Party	Québec 21 - Équipe JF Gosselin	Transition Quebec
Leader's seat	Sainte-Thérèse-de-Lisieux	Limoilou
Last election	2 seats	New party
Seats won	4	1
Seat change	▲2	▲1
Popular vote	45,477	12,306
Percentage	24.67%	6.67%
- Council results by district
Mayor before election
Régis Labeaume
Elected mayor
Bruno Marchand

Municipal elections were held in Quebec City on November 7, 2021, the same day as elections in Montreal and other municipalities in the province.

== Background ==
The election took place as Quebec, Canada and the world continued to manage the COVID-19 pandemic in Quebec. Outgoing mayor Régis Labeaume, announced he was not running for another term, making it the first time since 2007 that a new mayor was to be elected in the city.

== Candidates ==
The primary candidates included Jackie Smith (leader of Transition Québec), Marie-Josée Savard (who had the support of Labeaume), Jean-François Gosselin former Action démocratique du Québec MNA and leader of Québec 21, Jean Rousseau, leader of Démocratie Québec and Bruno Marchand, former director of the United Way of Canada in the Capitale-Nationale, Chaudière-Appalaches and Bas-Saint-Laurent regions.

Mayoral Candidates
Candidate	Profession	Party	Running mate
Marie-Josée Savard	Businesswoman	EMJS	–
Jean-François Gosselin	Businessman	Q21	–
Jean Rousseau	Chemist	DQ	David Johnson
Jackie Smith	Business analyst	TQ	Madeleine Cloutier
Bruno Marchand	Social worker	QFF	–

Candidates by party
Party	Candidates		Total
Party	Mayor	Municipal councillors	Total
Équipe Marie-Josée Savard	1	-	-
Québec 21	1	–	-
Démocratie Québec	1	–	-
Transition Québec	1	7	7
Québec forte et fière	1	-	-
Independent	–	–	-
Total	-	-	-

== Political parties ==
=== Québec 21 ===
Slogan : Pour un vote historique / Pour participer au changement (English: For a historical vote / To participate in change)

=== Démocratie Québec ===
Slogan : Ensemble, c'est mieux (English: Better together)

A year before the election, on October 3, 2020, Jean Rousseau, the party's only member on the City Council, was named the party's leader by acclamation.

=== Transition Québec ===
Slogan : Changeons de cap (English: Let's change course)

The party Option Capitale-Nationale appeared in previous municipal elections as the municipal wing of Option nationale, a progressive sovereigntist party. Following Option Nationale's merger with Québec Solidaire, Option Capitale-Nationale changed its name to "Transition Québec" in May 2020. Like its provincial counterparts, Transition Québec focuses on issues of environmental sustainability, Left-wing solidarity, and feminism. Since June 19, 2019, the party has been led by Jacquelyn Smith, who ran in the previous election in the Limoilou district as a member of Démocratie Québec.

=== Québec Forte et Fière ===
Slogan : Pour une ville forte et fière (English: For a city strong and proud)

On February 15, 2021, a new political party joined the election. Bruno Marchand, former director of the United Way of Canada in the Capitale-Nationale, Chaudière-Appalaches and Bas-Saint-Laurent regions, was named as party leader. The party supported the Quebec City tramway project of Mayor Labeaume's administration, but withheld judgement on a possible third line between Québec City and Lévis until it was officially announced by the government. Portraying themselves as centrist, the party hopes to establish "positive and benevolent leadership".

== Results ==
=== Mayor ===
2021 Quebec City municipal election
Party	Candidate	Votes	%
Québec forte et fière	Bruno Marchand	59,580	32.32
Équipe Marie-Josée Savard	Marie-Josée Savard	58,746	31.86
Québec 21	Jean-François Gosselin	45,477	24.67
Transition Québec	Jackie Smith	12,306	6.67
Démocratie Québec	Jean Rousseau	7,204	3.91
Alliance citoyenne	Alain Giasson	398	0.22
Independent	Lucie Perreault	374	0.20
Independent	Patrice Fortin	277	0.15

=== City Council ===
Party	Candidates	Votes	%	+/-	Seats	+/-
Équipe Marie-Josée Savard	21	57 857	31,53	15,71	10	7
Québec forte et fière	21	55 501	30,24	Nv.	6	6
Québec 21	21	45 761	24,94	5,32	4	2
Transition Québec	21	14 342	7,81	5,71	1	1
Démocratie Québec	20	8 060	4,39	11,74	0	1
Alliance citoyenne de Québec	4	257	0,14	0,51	0	
Indépendants	6	1 743	0,95	-	0	1
Valid votes		183 521	98,76			
Invalid Votes		2 312	1,24			
Total		185 833	100	-	21	
Abstention		225 416	54,81			
Inscrits / participation		411 249	45,19			

=== City Council Districts ===
==== La Cité-Limoilou ====
District 1 – Cap-aux-Diamants
Party	Candidate	Vote	%
Québec forte et fière	Mélissa Coulombe-Leduc	2,272	30.20
Transition Québec	Alexia Oman	1,507	20.03
Démocratie Québec	Jean Rousseau (X)	1,503	19.98
Équipe Marie-Josée Savard	Boufeldja Benabdallah	1,425	18.94
Québec 21	Cynthia Laflamme	816	10.85

District 2 – Montcalm–Saint-Sacrement
Party	Candidate	Vote	%
Québec forte et fière	Catherine Vallières-Roland	3,736	43.06
Équipe Marie-Josée Savard	Maxime Gravel-Renaud	2,362	27.22
Transition Québec	Michel Houle	1,041	12.00
Québec 21	Jean-Pierre Du Sault	919	10.59
Démocratie Québec	Katia Garon	619	7.13

District 3 – Saint-Roch–Saint-Sauveur
Party	Candidate	Vote	%
Québec forte et fière	Pierre-Luc Lachance (X)	2,536	34.62
Équipe Marie-Josée Savard	Paul-Christian Nolin	1,630	22.25
Transition Québec	Élisabeth Germain	1,430	19.52
Québec 21	Marie-Josée Proteau	918	12.53
Démocratie Québec	Mbaï-Hadji Mbaïrewaye	525	7.17
Independent	Alexandra Tremblay	245	3.34
Alliance citoyenne	Nicolas Bouffard-Savoie	41	0.56

District 4 – Limoilou
Party	Candidate	Vote	%
Transition Québec	Jackie Smith	2,665	38.49
Équipe Marie-Josée Savard	Suzanne Verreault (X)	1,746	22.22
Québec forte et fière	Florent Tanlet	1,361	19.66
Québec 21	Stéphane Gignac	954	13.78
Démocratie Québec	Simon Levasseur	197	2.85

District 5 – Maizerets-Lairet
Party	Candidate	Vote	%
Équipe Marie-Josée Savard	Claude Villeneuve	1,870	32.00
Transition Québec	Hamed Sandra Adam	1,338	22.90
Québec forte et fière	Charlotte Vachon	1,228	21.01
Québec 21	Marie-Claude Lavoie	1,076	18.41
Démocratie Québec	Omar Berri	199	3.41
Alliance citoyenne	Daniel Lachance	78	1.33
Independent	Dalila Elhak	55	0.94

==== Les Rivières ====
District 6 – Vanier-Duberger
Party	Candidate	Vote	%
Équipe Marie-Josée Savard	Alicia Despins (X)	3,158	41.27
Québec 21	Shirley Burns	2,103	27.48
Québec forte et fière	Jessica Flautre-Aubry	1,852	24.20
Transition Québec	Salem Billard	309	4.04
Démocratie Québec	Jason Noble	230	3.01

District 7 – Neufchâtel-Lebourgneuf
Party	Candidate	Vote	%
Équipe Marie-Josée Savard	Patricia Boudreault-Bruyère	3,490	34.57
Québec 21	Patrick Paquet (X)	3,126	30.97
Québec forte et fière	Sophie Gingras	2,900	28.73
Démocratie Québec	Mario Albert	301	2.98
Transition Québec	Laurance Marquis-Gendron	278	2.75

District 8 – Saules–Les Méandres
Party	Candidate	Vote	%
Équipe Marie-Josée Savard	Véronique Dallaire	31,97	40.52
Québec forte et fière	Christine Marinelli	2,141	27.14
Québec 21	Gabriel Hardy	2,041	25.87
Transition Québec	Alexandra Larouche	260	3.30
Démocratie Québec	Simon Domingue	250	3.17

==== Sainte-Foy–Sillery–Cap-Rouge ====
District 9 – Saint-Louis–Sillery
Party	Candidate	Vote	%
Québec forte et fière	Maude Mercier Larouche	4,216	39.05
Équipe Marie-Josée Savard	Émilie Villeneuve (X)	3,376	31.27
Québec 21	Claude Duplessis	1,350	12.50
Transition Québec	Louis-Charles Beaudoin-Lacroix	965	8.94
Démocratie Québec	Huguette Lépine	820	7.59
Alliance citoyenne	Serge Laberge	70	0.65

District 10 – Plateau
Party	Candidate	Vote	%
Équipe Marie-Josée Savard	David Weiser	2,839	38.25
Québec forte et fière	Sophia Laababsi	2,146	28.91
Québec 21	Serge Simard	1,416	19.08
Transition Québec	Anne-Marie Thivierge	887	11.95
Independent	Ali Dahan	134	1.81

District 11 – Pointe-de-Sainte-Foy
Party	Candidate	Vote	%
Équipe Marie-Josée Savard	Anne Corrieveau (X)	3,854	39.83
Québec forte et fière	Jean-Luc Lavoie	3,477	35.93
Québec 21	Jean Arsenault	1,531	15.82
Transition Québec	Charles Lamont	401	4.14
Démocratie Québec	Pierre Martin	329	3.40
Independent	Moussa Sangaré	85	0.88

District 12 – Cap-Rouge–Laurentien
Party	Candidate	Vote	%
Équipe Marie-Josée Savard	Louis Martin	3,875	34.18
Québec forte et fière	Jérôme Couture	3,774	33.29
Québec 21	Éric Lessard	2,336	20.60
Transition Québec	Andrée-Anne Côté-Jinchereau	599	5.28
Démocratie Québec	Jean Éric Fiorito	413	3.64
Independent	Philippe Moussette	341	3.01

==== Charlesbourg ====
District 13 – Saint-Rodrigue
Party	Candidate	Vote	%
Équipe Marie-Josée Savard	Claude Lavoie	2,564	33.74
Québec forte et fière	Charles Pagé	2,343	30.83
Québec 21	Brigitte Bois	1,867	24.57
Démocratie Québec	Anabelle Beaudoin	460	6.05
Transition Québec	Geneviève Le Houx	366	4.82

District 14 – Louis-XIV
Party	Candidate	Vote	%
Québec forte et fière	Marie-Pierre Boucher	3,728	34.28
Équipe Marie-Josée Savard	Archy-Donald Beaudry	3,435	31.59
Québec 21	Vincent Bégin	2,891	26.58
Transition Québec	Sébastien Tremblay	434	3.99
Démocratie Québec	Pierre Nadeau	387	3.56

District 15 – Monts
Party	Candidate	Vote	%
Québec 21	Eric Ralph Mercier	3,288	34.63
Équipe Marie-Josée Savard	Marie-Pier Dorion	2,838	29.89
Québec forte et fière	Catherine Morissette	2,764	29.11
Transition Québec	Samuel Moisan-Domm	326	3.43
Démocratie Québec	Bernard Martineau	278	2.93

==== Beauport ====
District 16 – Sainte-Thérèse-de-Lisieux
Party	Candidate	Vote	%
Québec 21	Jean-François Gosselin	3,521	38.62
Québec forte et fière	Marie France Trudel	2,954	32.40
Équipe Marie-Josée Savard	Luc Ferland	2,258	24.76
Démocratie Québec	Guy Boivin	203	2.23
Transition Québec	Pier-Yves Champagne	182	2.00

District 17 – Chute-Montmorency–Seigneurial
Party	Candidate	Vote	%
Québec 21	Stevens Mélançon (X)	4,624	46.02
Équipe Marie-Josée Savard	Benoit Jobin	2,621	26.08
Québec forte et fière	Éric Courtemanche Baril	2,271	22.60
Transition Québec	Pedro-Natanaël Bordón-Richard	282	2.81
Démocratie Québec	Nancy Legault	250	2.49

District 18 – Robert-Giffard
Party	Candidate	Vote	%
Équipe Marie-Josée Savard	Isabelle Roy	3,410	37.79
Québec 21	Marie Moreau	2,489	27.58
Québec forte et fière	Maxime Dion	2,227	24.68
Démocratie Québec	Lyne Girard	473	5.24
Transition Québec	Camille Lambert-Deubelbeiss	425	4.71

==== La Haute-Saint-Charles ====
District 19 – Lac-Saint-Charles–Saint-Émile
Party	Candidate	Vote	%
Équipe Marie-Josée Savard	Steeve Verret (X)	3,218	36.35
Québec 21	Marc Roussin	3,058	34.54
Québec forte et fière	Ludovic Lorrin	2,182	24.64
Démocratie Québec	Alexandre Ménard	227	2.56
Transition Québec	Carl Gignac	169	1.91

District 20 – Loretteville–Les Châtels
Party	Candidate	Vote	%
Québec forte et fière	Marie-Josée Asselin	3,231	34.56
Équipe Marie-Josée Savard	Émilie Robitaille	2,532	27.08
Québec 21	Roxanne Lavallée	2,227	23.82
Independent	Robert Martel	883	9.44
Transition Québec	Claudiane Laroche	252	2.70
Démocratie Québec	Eric Lapointe	224	2.40

District 21 – Val-Bélair
Party	Candidate	Vote	%
Québec 21	Bianca Dussault	3,209	40.37
Équipe Marie-Josée Savard	Richard Harvey	2,196	27.63
Québec forte et fière	Manon Robitaille	2,084	26.22
Transition Québec	Sarah Lesage	212	2.67
Démocratie Québec	Luc Paquin	178	2.24
Alliance citoyenne	René Hudon	69	0.87

== See also ==
- Quebec City Council
