= 2013 Quebec City municipal election =

← 2009	November 3, 2013	2017 →

21 seats in Quebec City Council
- Turnout: 54.9%
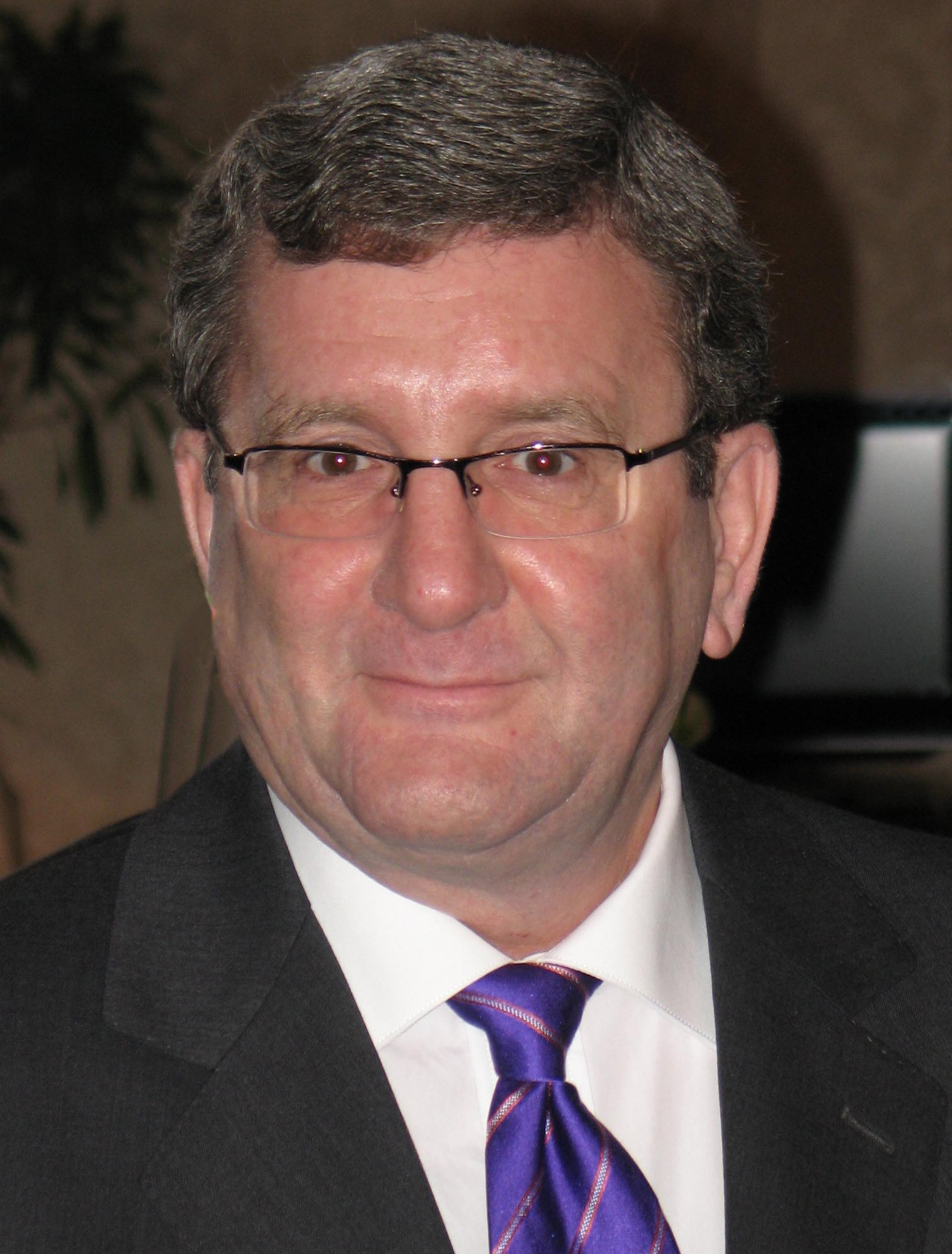

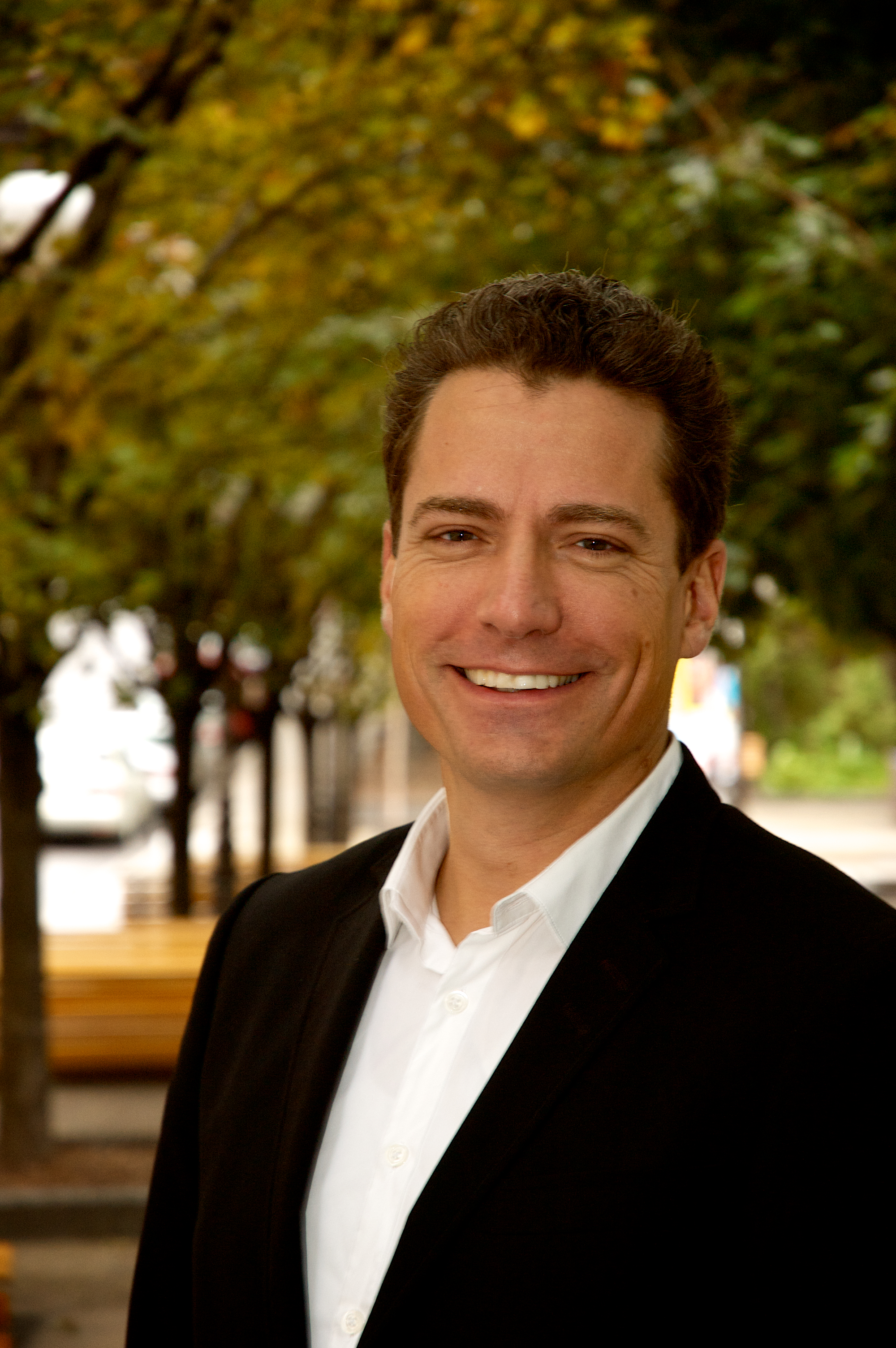
	First party	Second party
Leader	Régis Labeaume	David Lemelin
Party	Équipe Labeaume	Démocratie Québec
Leader since	2007	2013
Leader's seat	Mayor	Lost election in Cap-Rouge-Laurentien
Seats before	22 / 27	4 / 27
Seats won	18 / 21	3 / 21
Popular vote	161,216	52,293
Percentage	74.07%	24.03%
Mayor before election
Régis Labeaume
Équipe Labeaume
Elected mayor
Régis Labeaume
Équipe Labeaume

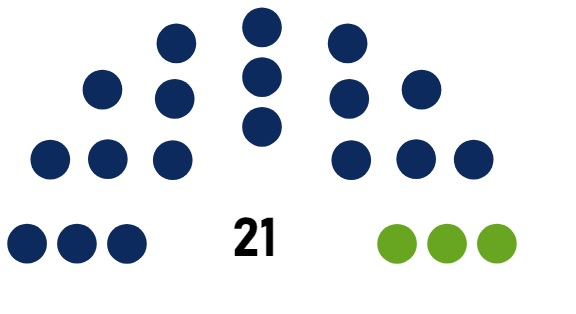
Conseil municipal

The 2013 Quebec City municipal election took place on November 3, 2013, to elect a mayor and city councillors in Quebec City, Quebec, Canada. The election is in conjunction with 2013 Quebec municipal elections to be held across the province on the same date.

Quebec City Council voted to reduce the number of councillors from 27 to 21 in time for the 2013 municipal election.

== Results ==
=== Mayor ===
Party	Mayoral candidate	Vote	%
Équipe Labeaume	Régis Labeaume (X)	161,216	74.07
Démocratie Québec	David Lemelin	52,293	24.03
Independent	Claude Gagnon	2,058	0.95
Independent	Denis Haché	1,077	0.49
Independent	Armand Paré	999	0.46
Total valid votes		217,643	100

=== City councillors ===
==== La Cité-Limoilou ====
City Councillor for District 1, Cap-aux-Diamants
Party	Candidate	Vote	%
Démocratie Québec	Anne Guérette (X)	4,619	55.01
Équipe Labeaume	Frédéric Poitras	3,778	44.99

City Councillor for District 2, Montcalm-Saint-Sacrement
Party	Candidate	Vote	%
Démocratie Québec	Yvon Bussières (X)	5,280	58.10
Équipe Labeaume	Sébastien Chamberland	3,808	41.90

City Councillor for District 3, Saint-Roch-Saint-Sauveur
Party	Candidate	Vote	%
Équipe Labeaume	Chantal Gilbert (X)	4,871	61.54
Démocratie Québec	Jean-Yves Roy	3,044	38.46

City Councillor for District 4, Limoilou
Party	Candidate	Vote	%
Équipe Labeaume	Suzanne Verreault (X)	4,871	63.53
Démocratie Québec	Frédéric Chrétien	2,731	33.28
Independent	Maïsa Mpembe Ntunga	261	3.18

City Councillor for District 5, Maizerets-Lairet
Party	Candidate	Vote	%
Équipe Labeaume	Geneviève Hamelin (X)	4,891	68.40
Démocratie Québec	Ginette Picard-Lavoie (X)	2,260	31.60

==== Les Rivières ====
City Councillor for District 6, Vanier
Party	Candidate	Vote	%
Équipe Labeaume	Natacha Jean	5,807	75.97
Démocratie Québec	Denis L'Anglais	1,837	24.03

City Councillor for District 7, Neufchâtel-Lebourgneuf
Party	Candidate	Vote	%
Équipe Labeaume	Jonatan Julien	9,539	72.47
Démocratie Québec	Patrick Paquet (X)	3,623	27.53

City Councillor for District 8, Duberger-Les Saules
Party	Candidate	Vote	%
Équipe Labeaume	Dominique Tanguay	6,769	70.50
Démocratie Québec	Michel Légaré	2,524	26.29
Independent	Guillaume Labonté-Côté	309	3.22

==== Sainte-Foy–Sillery–Cap-Rouge ====
City Councillor for District 9, Saint-Louis-Sillery
Party	Candidate	Vote	%
Démocratie Québec	Paul Shoiry	7,081	60.55
Équipe Labeaume	Robert Dinan	4,614	39.45

City Councillor for District 10, Le Plateau
Party	Candidate	Vote	%
Équipe Labeaume	Rémy Normand	5,917	68.22
Démocratie Québec	Abdoul Echraf	2,757	31.78

City Councillor for District 11, La Pointe-de-Sainte-Foy
Party	Candidate	Vote	%
Équipe Labeaume	Anne Corriveau	6,836	59.78
Démocratie Québec	Johanne Elsener	4,230	36.99
Independent	Martine Gagné	369	3.23

City Councillor for District 12, Cap-Rouge-Laurentien
Party	Candidate	Vote	%
Équipe Labeaume	Laurent Proulx	7,237	53.08
Démocratie Québec	Conrad Verret*; *Co-candidate for David Lemelin	3,695	27.10
Independent	Jean Guilbault (X)	2,186	16.03
Independent	Philippe Moussette	419	3.07
Independent	Wellie Denoncourt	97	0.71

==== Charlesbourg ====
City Councillor for District 13, Saint-Rodrigue
Party	Candidate	Vote	%
Équipe Labeaume	Vincent Dufresne (X)	6,886	74.40
Démocratie Québec	Pascale Guelle	2,369	25.6

City Councillor for District 14, Louis-XIV
Party	Candidate	Vote	%
Équipe Labeaume	Michelle Morin-Doyle (X)	9,221	71.03
Démocratie Québec	Marie France Painchaud	3,306	25.47
Independent	Marc-Antoine Turmel	455	3.50

City Councillor for District 15, Les Monts
Party	Candidate	Vote	%
Équipe Labeaume	Patrick Voyer	8,555	71.13
Démocratie Québec	Jean-Louis Duchesne	2,544	21.15
Independent	Jacques Marchand	493	4.10
Independent	Brigitte Letarte	436	3.62

==== Beauport ====
City Councillor for District 16, Sainte-Thérèse-de-Lisieux
Party	Candidate	Vote	%
Équipe Labeaume	Marie France Trudel (X)	8,128	74.91
Démocratie Québec	Claudie Emond	2,250	20.74
Alliance de Québec	Daniel Beaulieu	282	2.60
Independent	Patrice Fortin	190	1.75

City Councillor for District 17, La Chute-Montmorency-Seigneurial
Party	Candidate	Vote	%
Équipe Labeaume	Julie Lemieux (X)	8,942	76.66
Démocratie Québec	Frédéric de Beaumont	2,380	20.40
Alliance de Québec	Mario Hurens	343	2.94

City Councillor for District 18, Robert-Giffard
Party	Candidate	Vote	%
Équipe Labeaume	Jérémie Ernould	7,545	69.60
Démocratie Québec	Benoît Gingras	2,401	22.15
Independent	Denis Bérubé	565	5.21
Alliance de Québec	Chantal Bouchard	330	3.04

==== La Haute-Saint-Charles ====
City Councillor for District 19, Lac-Saint-Charles-Saint-Émile
Party	Candidate	Vote	%
Équipe Labeaume	Steeve Verret (X)	Acclaimed	

City Councillor for District 20, Loretteville-Les Châtels
Party	Candidate	Vote	%
Équipe Labeaume	Raymond Dion (X)	9,221	64.56
Démocratie Québec	Robert Martel	3,855	31.48
Independent	Richard Legendre	485	3.96

City Councillor for District 21, Val-Bélair
Party	Candidate	Vote	%
Équipe Labeaume	Sylvain Légaré (X)	7,367	71.78
Démocratie Québec	Michel Carrier	2,897	28.22
