= Équipe Priorité Québec =

Équipe Priorité Québec was a municipal political party in Quebec City registered with the Directeur général des élections du Québec from June 8, 2017 to August 2025. From its foundation in 2017 until December 5, 2022, the party was known as Québec 21.

== History ==
=== Origins ===
The party's roots come from the debate (which originally began in 2014) around the construction of a new highway between Quebec and Lévis and opposition to the modernization of public transportation in the Quebec City region. As the 2017 Quebec municipal elections approached, some voters came out against the bus rapid transit project proposed by Mayor Régis Labeaume. Frédérick « Fred » Têtu, a Right-wing climate-skeptic and philosophy teacher, ferociously critiqued initiatives aimed at encouraging modes of transportation other than by car. Têtu found an audience on radio station CHOI Radio X, where his ideas resonated with listeners. Québec 21 (a reference to the 21 municipal electoral districts) was registered with Elections Québec on June 8, 2017. To lead the party, Têtu approached Jean-François Gosselin, former Action démocratique du Québec MNA in 2007. Têtu, for his part, resigned after a short interview in which, accused of being drunk, he said "fuck voting rights".

During the 2017 campaign, Gosselin clearly affirmed the party's opposition to public transportation project of the other parties. However, he took a less clear tone on some subjects, stating that he deferred to the scientific consensus on climate change. Additionally, Gosselin ran on a fiscal conservative platform, criticising tax increases on local merchants. In the election, the party was elected to two seats in Beauport, previously held by Équipe Labeaume.

Stevens Mélançon was elected in the district of Chute-Montmorency-Seigneurial. In the race for mayor, Jean-François Gosselin got second place with 27.6% of the vote, behind Régis Labeaume (55.3%). Gosselin was able to get a seat in the Quebec City Council when Nancy Piuze, gave him her seat in Sainte-Thérèse-de-Lisieux.

=== Opposition in City Hall ===
After another opposition party, Démocratie Québec, did not elect a councillor, Québec 21 was designated the official opposition in the city council. When Mayor Régis Labeaume announced a project to build a tramway for 2026, the party weakened its policy against public transit. Gosselin even proposed a subway rapid transit system, a system that would have provided greater capacity but would be more expensive. Gosselin mentioned that he wanted to improve the reputation of the parties ideas and policies. The party maintained its strong support for the Québec-Lévis Highway. During the 2018 municipal by-election on December 9, the party successfully elected its candidate Patrick Paquet in Neufchâtel-Lebourgneuf, leading to the party have three councillors in the council.

Despite its success, an internal conflict between Gosselin and the internal administration of the party escalated in February 2019. Gosselin criticized "ethically questionable expenses" by party leadership, while party leadership tried to hold a vote of confidence on Gosselin's leadership at an extraordinary general meeting in April 2018. Six members of the party executive, including president Serge Marcotte and general-director Nancy Piuze, resigned on April 3, 2019.

=== 2021 elections ===
The party changed its logo in February 2020.

In May 2021, Gosselin announced that for the 2021 Quebec City municipal election, Patrick Paquet would run in Neufchâtel-Lebourgneuf and Stevens Mélançon in Chute-Montmorency-Seigneurial.

Éric R. Mercier joined the party as a candidate just before the election. Gosselin again ran for Mayor of Quebec, coming in third place after four years as leader of the opposition. Following this defeat, Gosselin resigned. His running mate, Manouchka Blanchet, who won her district in Sainte-Thérèse-de-Lisieux by more than 550 votes, gave her seat to him.

Bianca Dusseault was elected for the first time during the 2021 elections in the district of Val-Bélair.

Eric R. Mercier, elected in the district of Monts à Charlesbourg, became the interim leader of the party. Mercier promised to evolve the party, collaborate with new mayor Bruno Marchand, but that he would watch his administration closely.

By the end of November 2021, Québec 21 lost one of its members, as Stevens Mélançon left the party and chose to sit in the council as an independent. This left Mercier, Gosselin, and Bianca Dussault as the party's representatives in the council.

=== Name change to Équipe Priorité Québec ===
In August 2022, interim leader Eric Mercier announced that former councillor Patrick Paquet would be hired by the party to serve as a special advisor to the councillors. Unhappy with several decisions, Gosselin and Dussault left the party to sit as independents, leaving Mercier as the party's only member in the council.

The party underwent major changes in November 2022. Mercier stepped down in his role as interim leader, giving it to Patrick Paquet. Additionally, the party announced the return of Stevens Mélançon as a member. Wishing to bring in a new direction and image, the party announced that it was going to change its name and logo.

On December 5, 2022, the party was renamed Équipe Priorité Québec.

== Leadership ==
- June 19, 2017 – November 7, 2021: Jean-François Gosselin
- November 11, 2021 – November 8, 2022: Éric R. Mercier
- November 8, 2022 – March 25, 2025 Patrick Paquet (interim),
- March 25, 2025 - August 13, 2025 : Stevens Mélançon

== Election results ==
Election results
| Election | Leader | Mayor | Councillors | Place | Slogan |
|---|---|---|---|---|---|
| 2017 Quebec municipal elections | Jean-François Gosselin | | 2 / 21 | 2nd | Le choix du changement |
| December 9, 2018 municipal by-election | Jean-François Gosselin | | 3 / 21 | 1st | |
| 2021 Quebec City municipal election | Jean-François Gosselin | | 4 / 21 | 3rd | Pour participer au changement |

== Logos ==
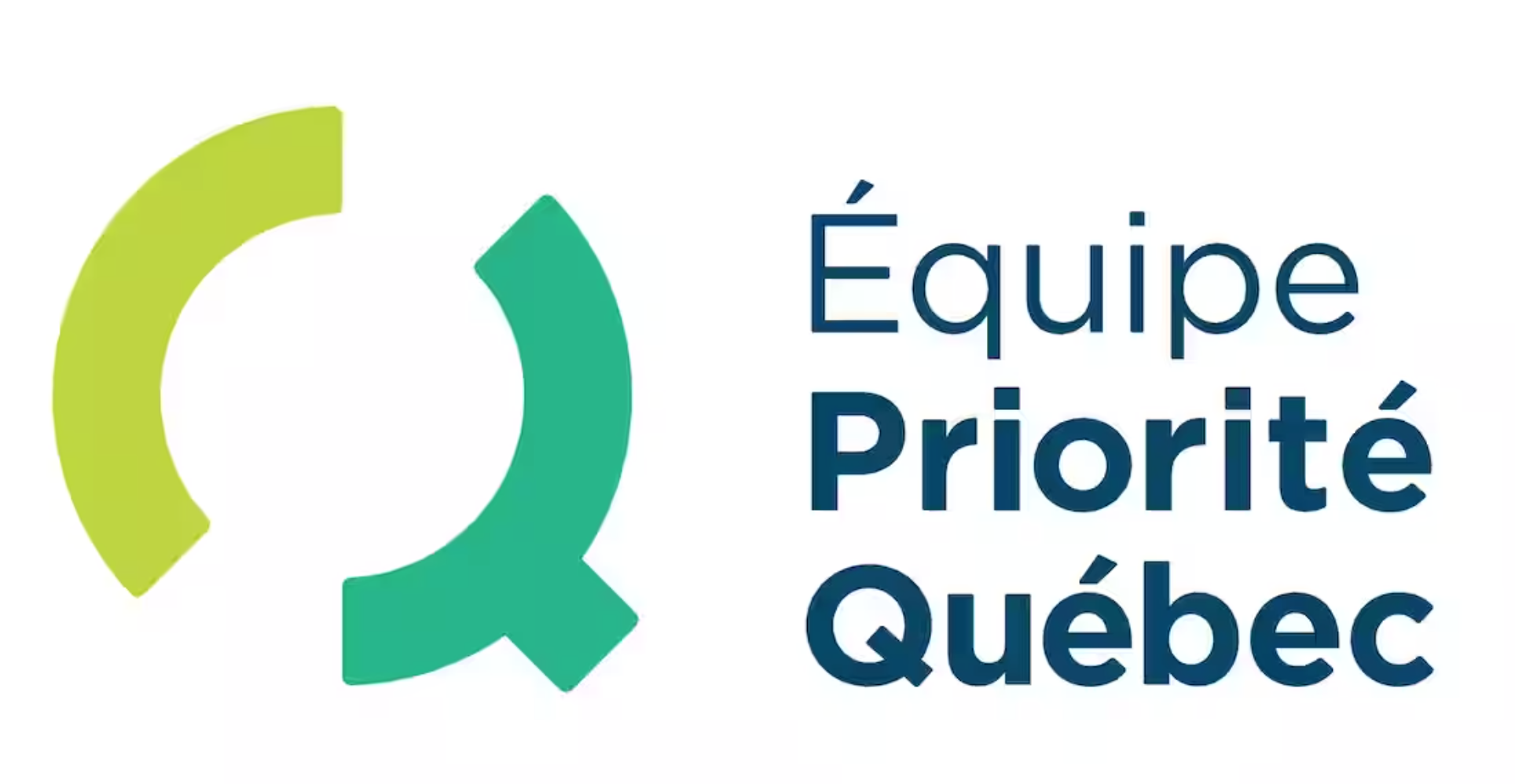
Logo since December 2022
