= Télesphore Simard =

Télesphore Simard may refer to:

- Télesphore Simard (Témiscamingue politician) (1863–1924), member of Legislative Assembly of Quebec in Témiscamingue riding
- Télesphore Simard (Quebec City politician) (1878–1955), mayor of Quebec City
