= Transition Quebec =

Canadian municipal political party

- Leader: Camille Lambert-Deubelbeiss
- Founded: 18 June 2017
- Split from: Option nationale
- Ideology: Progressivism; Green politics Quebec sovereigntism

Transition Québec is a municipal political party in Quebec City. The party, originally founded in June 2017 as Option Capitale-Nationale, took on its current name in 2020. During the 2021 Quebec City municipal elections, the party earned one seat in the Quebec City Council, when their then leader Jackie Smith was elected in Limoilou. Following a defeat in 2025, Jackie Smith resigned her role as party leader and Camille Lambert-Deubelbeiss was named as interim leader. A race for the leadership is planned for early 2027.

== History ==
In 2017, members of the provincial political party Option nationale from the Capitale-Nationale region decided to form a new municipal political party in Québec City. The party's leader, Nicolas Lavigne-Lefebvre, ran for mayor of Quebec City in the 2017 mayoral election and began planning for the municipal elections in November 2017 under the name Option Capitale-Nationale. The party's founders wanted to give the city a mayor who was progressive, environmentalist, and indépendantiste. The party was officially launched on June 18, 2017 and on August 13, 2017 the party nominated three candidates for city council. A few days later, the party registered with the directeur général des élections du Québec.

During the 2017 Quebec municipal elections, Option Capitale-Nationale fielded candidates in 20 of the region's 21 districts, 17 men and three women. Of those candidates, one had to suspend their campaign a month before the election. With 1.42% of the vote, Lavigne-Lefebvre finished fourth in the mayoral race. The party's candidates for council obtained between 0.78% and 5.86% in their districts, averaging 2.10% of the vote region-wide.

== Name change and restructure ==
In 2019, the party named a new leader, Jackie Smith, a candidate who had come in second place in Limoilou under Démocratie Québec. In the desire to rebuild the party after the fusion of Option nationale and Québec solidaire the party renamed itself Transition Quebec and restructured the party on February 3, 2020. On September 16, 2021, the party unveiled its slogan for the campaign: « Changeons de cap »

== 2021 elections ==
During the 2021 Quebec City municipal election, the party nominated candidates in all the municipal districts, with Smith running for mayor. With 6.56% of the votes in the city, the Smith came in fourth place in the mayoral race. Smith was elected city councillor for the district of Limoilou under the banner of her running mate Madeleine Cloutier, who finished first with 38.36% of the vote. Overall, the party's candidates did better than under the name Option Capitale-Nationale in 2017, receiving a higher vote percentage in 20 of the 21 districts and coming in second place in two districts (Maizeret-Lairet et Cap-aux-Diamants). Overall, the party received 7.81% of the vote.

The party's strongest performance was in the downtown centre of Quebec City, especially in the districts of Saint-Roch-Saint-Sauveur (19,52 %), Limoilou (38.36%, where leader Jackie Smith won her seat with running mate Madeleine Cloutier), Cap-aux-Diamants (20,16 %) et de Maizeret-Lairet (22.96%). During the municipal debate on October 7, 2021, party leader Jackie Smith received social media attention by shedding light to a climate skeptic candidate for Québec 21.

== Ideology ==
The party focuses primarily on combatting climate change on a municipal level, as well as support for policies like:

- Social justice;
- Fiscal environmentalism and a circular economy;
- Local democracy and a sovereign Quebec;
- Promotion of interculturalism as a model for integration;
- Modern urban planning, universality of municipal services and human scaled development

Members of Transition Québec are also known for their opposition to a third crossing of the Saint Lawrence River between Levis and Quebec City, and the Projet Laurentia.
