= Andrée Boucher =

Canadian politician (1937–2007)

Andrée P. Boucher
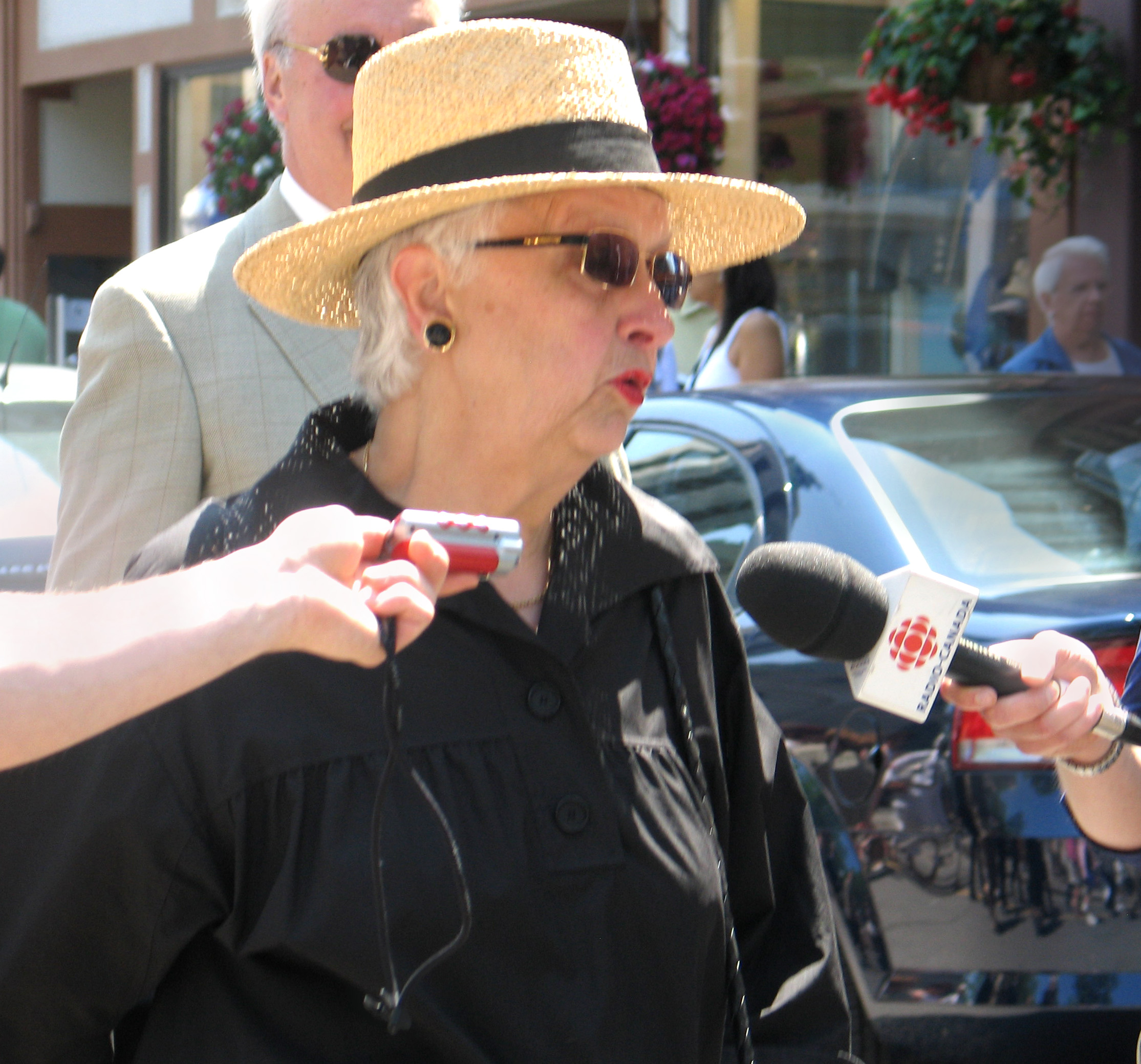

39th Mayor of Quebec City
- In office November 19, 2005 – August 24, 2007
- Preceded by: Jean-Paul L'Allier
- Succeeded by: Jacques Joli-Cœur (interim)

Personal details
- Born: January 31, 1937 Sainte-Foy, Quebec, Canada
- Died: August 24, 2007 (aged 70) Quebec City, Quebec, Canada
- Party: Independent
- Spouse: Marc Boucher

Andrée Plamondon Boucher (French pronunciation: [ɑ̃dʁe buʃe]; January 31, 1937 – August 24, 2007) was a Canadian politician from the province of Quebec. She was the mayor of Quebec City from November 19, 2005, until her death. Previously, she had been the mayor of the city of Sainte-Foy, formerly a suburb of Quebec City, from 1985 until 2001, when the cities of Sainte-Foy and Quebec were merged. She was the first woman to become leader of a municipal political party in the province of Quebec.

== Biography ==
Born Andrée Plamondon, she attended the Université Laval and obtained a bachelor's degree in education and was a teacher for several years.

She entered municipal politics in the municipality of Sainte-Foy, in 1968, often in the role of extra-parliamentary critic of mayor Bernardin Morin. She became leader of the Action Sainte-Foy municipal political party and was elected city councillor in 1984. She was elected mayor of Sainte-Foy in 1985 and served until 2002, when Sainte-Foy and other suburbs were merged with Quebec City. From 1995 to 1999, she was vice-president of the Union des Municipalités du Québec, an association of mayors from various cities across the province.

In 2001, Boucher was the Action civique de Québec party candidate for mayor of the newly amalgamated Quebec City. She was defeated by Jean-Paul L'Allier, the incumbent mayor and a former provincial MNA and cabinet minister. Boucher fought the merger of Quebec City and its suburbs during that campaign.

During her political and media careers Boucher opposed several high-profile events and developments proposed for Quebec City, including the Rendez-vous '87 ice hockey tournament between the Soviet Union and players of the National Hockey League, the building of a new ice hockey arena for the National Hockey League's Quebec Nordiques, which subsequently became the Colorado Avalanche in 1995, and the 2002 Winter Olympics bid, which were eventually held in Salt Lake City, Utah.

After a brief stint as a radio host, Boucher attempted a political comeback by running as an independent candidate for mayor of Quebec City in 2005. She did not post any campaign signs or present any platform, running her campaign on a budget of CA$5,000. Despite this, she was elected on November 6, 2005. She was sworn into office on November 19, becoming the first female mayor in Quebec City's history. During her tenure as mayor, she planned multiple projects and events related to the 400th anniversary of the city's foundation by Samuel de Champlain in 1608.

== Death ==
Boucher died in the early afternoon on August 24, 2007, while at home. At 12:11 pm, a call was issued to the Sainte-Foy–Sillery police station by the mayor's husband, Marc Boucher, requiring emergency assistance for his wife, whom he had found lying motionless on her bed. Boucher's death was confirmed at Laval hospital. The cause of death was a heart attack attributed to ischemia that caused Boucher to lose oxygen from her cardiac muscle. She was succeeded as mayor by councillor Jacques Joli-Coeur until a special election selected Régis Labeaume in December.
