= William Hossak =

Canadian politician

Mayor William M. Hossak
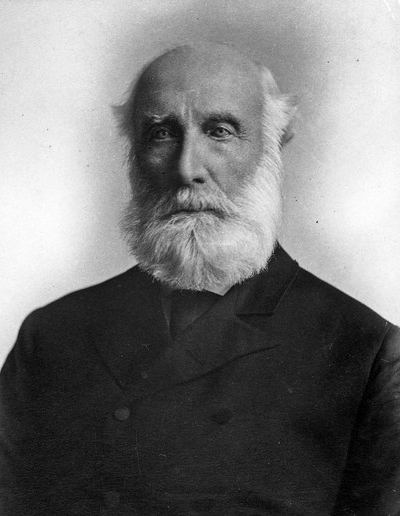

Mayor of Quebec City
- In office 12 November 1869 – 7 January 1870
- Preceded by: John Lemesurier
- Succeeded by: Adolphe Guillet dit Tourangeau

Member of Quebec City Council for St. Louis Ward
- In office 1861–1869

Personal details
- Born: 12 January 1814 Quebec City, Quebec
- Died: 1896 (age c. 82)
- Spouse: Helen Peebles (m. 1868)

William M. Hossak (12 January 1814 – 1896) was a Canadian politician, serving as mayor of Quebec City from November 1869 to January 1870.

Hossak worked at his father's grocery business until establishing his own business, a leather tannery. That enterprise was destroyed in the massive Quebec City fire of 1845 after which Hossak returned to selling groceries.

After retiring from business and travelling through Europe and Egypt, Hossak returned to Quebec City and became a city councillor in the St Louis ward for eight years until his appointment as the city's mayor in November 1869. However, Hossak was unable to legally maintain the mayor's chair because of his residency outside the city and therefore left office within two months.

In 1888, Hossak continued to contribute to public life as Chair of the Protestant Board of School Commissioners, the vice-president of the Literary and Historical Society and the president of the Quebec City Mission. He was a member of the city's Chalmers Church serving as treasurer in the late 1880s.
