= Union des Municipalités du Québec =

The Union des Municipalités du Québec (English: Union of Quebec Municipalities) is an organization representing municipalities in the Canadian province of Quebec. The UMQ's website indicates that it has existed since 1919, representing municipalities of all sizes in all regions of the province.

In 2010, Quebec City mayor Régis Labeaume announced that he was pulling his city out of the organization. The UMQ responded with a letter criticizing his decision.
