= Joseph-Octave Samson =

Canadian politician

Mayor Joseph-Octave Samson
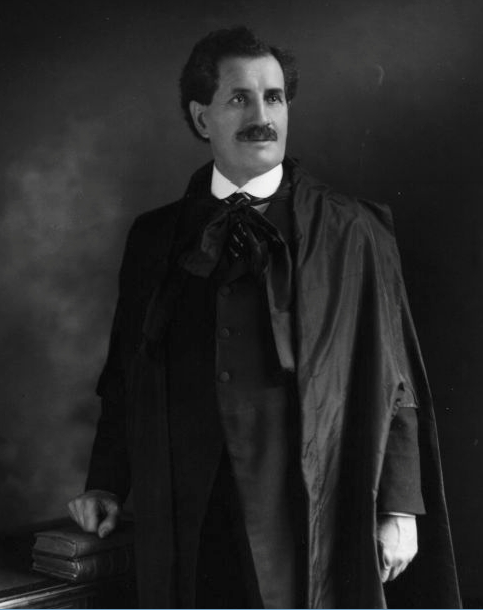

28th Mayor of Quebec City
- In office 1 March 1920 – 1 March 1926
- Preceded by: Henri-Edgar Lavigueur
- Succeeded by: Valmont Martin

Member of Legislative Assembly of Quebec, Québec-Centre
- In office 1927–1935
- Preceded by: Pierre-Vincent Faucher
- Succeeded by: Philippe Hamel

Personal details
- Born: 9 January 1862 Saint-Isidore-de-Dorchester, Canada East
- Died: 10 December 1945 (aged 83) Quebec City, Quebec, Canada
- Spouse: Fébronie Émond (m. 26 January 1885)
- Profession: businessperson

Joseph-Octave Samson (9 January 1862 – 10 December 1945) was a Canadian politician, serving as Mayor of Quebec City from March 1920 to March 1926.

After working with business interests, including his joint founding of the Samson & Filion Hardware company in 1887, Samson became a Quebec City councillor at the Saint-Pierre ward from 1904 to 1906 and again from 1908 to 1910. Samson was elected mayor of Quebec City on 16 February 1920. During his term as mayor, provincial premier Louis-Alexandre Taschereau accused Samson of faulty city administration.

After leaving his post as mayor, he was elected to the Legislative Assembly of Quebec as a Liberal member for the Québec-Centre riding in 1927. He was re-elected to a second term in 1931 but defeated in the 1935 election. His son, Wilfrid Samson, also became a municipal and provincial politician.
