= Joseph-Oscar Auger =

Canadian politician

Mayor Joseph-Oscar Auger
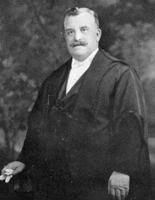
- J.-Oscar Auger

31st Mayor of Quebec City
- In office 1 March 1928 – 1 March 1930
- Preceded by: Télesphore Simard
- Succeeded by: Henri-Edgar Lavigueur

Personal details
- Born: 14 August 1873 Quebec City, Quebec, Canada
- Died: 19 April 1942 (age 68) Quebec City, Quebec, Canada
- Spouse: Maud Dancase
- Profession: Businessman

Joseph-Oscar Auger (1873–1942) was a Canadian politician, serving as Mayor of Quebec City from 1928 to 1930.

Auger won the 20 February 1928 city election over incumbent mayor Télesphore Simard by a 7046 to 4752 vote.
