= Valmont Martin =

Canadian politician

Mayor Valmont Martin
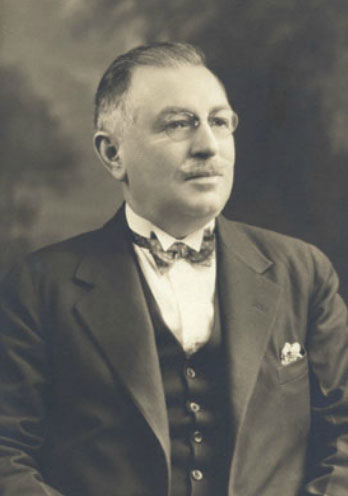
- Valmont Martin

29th Mayor of Quebec City
- In office 1 March 1926 – 7 December 1927
- Preceded by: Joseph Samson
- Succeeded by: Télesphore Simard

Personal details
- Born: 19 May 1875 Carleton, Quebec
- Died: 24 February 1935 (age 59) Québec, Quebec
- Spouse: Eugénie Brunet
- Profession: Physician

Valmont Martin (May 19, 1875, in Carleton – February 24, 1935, in Quebec City) was a Canadian physician and politician, serving as mayor of Quebec City from March 1, 1926 to December 7, 1927.

== Biography ==
Valmont Martin was the son of Henri-Josué Martin and Amélia-Jeanne Verge. He studied at the Séminaire de Rimouski. He was a medical doctor, a graduate of Université Laval. Beginning in 1899, he practiced medicine during 32 years in the Saint-Roch neighbourhood in the town of Québec. He married Eugénie Brunet.

He was an alderman (échevin) in the Jacques-Cartier ward of Québec from February 26, 1912, until 1917, and an alderman in the Saint-Roch ward from 1917 until March 1, 1924.

Martin was candidate for the office of mayor in the 1924 election but he was defeated by incumbent mayor Joseph Samson, who was in office since 1920. In the February 15, 1926, election, Martin was again a candidate against Samson and this time Martin was elected mayor, by a narrow margin. Soon after taking office, Martin contracted an unspecified illness and was bed-ridden for several months. Then, he became disenchanted by disagreements between the members of the city council and by the financial difficulties of the city due to insufficient revenues. His two-year term of office was due to end in March 1928, but in the autumn of 1927 Valmont resigned and, on November 29, 1927, the city council appointed him as the director of the municipal Hygiene service and of the Hôpital civique. (Officially, he left office as mayor on December 7, 1927, after the nomination of his successor). He was succeeded by Télesphore Simard, who was chosen by the city council for completing the remaining months of the mayoral term of office.

In 1929, Martin became an associate professor at université Laval. In 1931, he became head physician of the Société d'hospitalisation.

Avenue Valmont-Martin in Québec is named after him since 1959 (it was named "avenue Martin" from 1959 until 2006 and was renamed "avenue Valmont-Martin" in 2006).
