= Jacques Joli-Cœur =

Canadian mayor

Jacques Joli-Cœur CQ

40th Mayor of Quebec City
- In office August 24, 2007 – December 8, 2007
- Preceded by: Andrée Boucher
- Succeeded by: Régis Labeaume

City Councillor for district of Samuel-de-Champlain (La Cité-Limoilou)
- In office 2001–2009
- Succeeded by: district abolished (replaced by new district of Vieux-Québec-Montcalm)

Personal details
- Born: 1940 (age 85–86)
- Party: Renouveau municipal de Québec

Jacques Joli-Cœur, CQ (born 1940) is a politician from the Renouveau municipal de Québec in Quebec, Canada. A city councillor and deputy mayor, he was the interim mayor of Quebec City following the death of Andrée Boucher on August 24, 2007.

Prior his involvement in municipal politics, he was a top civil servant in the provincial government, where he served as provincial director of protocol between 1979 and 1984 and as an assistant deputy minister for several departments between 1994 and 2001.

Elected as councillor for district of Samuel-de-Champlain in the borough of La Cité-Limoilou in 2001, he lost in the new district of Vieux-Québec-Montcalm to Anne Guérette in 2009.

In 2012, he was made a Knight of the National Order of Quebec.
