= Henri-Edgar Lavigueur =

Canadian politician

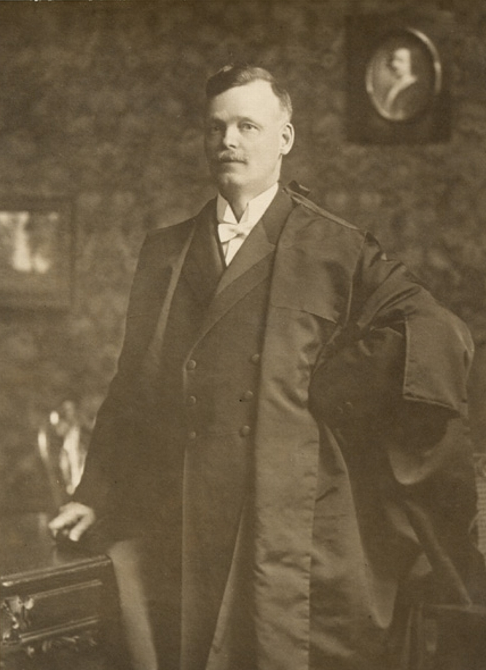

Alderman, Saint-Jean-Baptiste ward, Quebec City
- In office 1906–1916

27th Mayor of Quebec City
- In office 1 March 1916 – 20 February 1920
- Preceded by: Olivier-Napoléon Drouin
- Succeeded by: Joseph-Octave Samson

Member of Parliament for Quebec County
- In office December 1917 – October 1925

Member of Parliament for Québec—Montmorency
- In office October 1925 – July 1930

32nd Mayor of Quebec City
- In office 26 February 1930 – 26 January 1934
- Preceded by: Joseph-Oscar Auger
- Succeeded by: Joseph-Ernest Grégoire

Personal details
- Born: 16 February 1867 Quebec City, Quebec, Canada
- Died: 29 October 1943 (aged 76)
- Party: Liberal
- Profession: merchant

Henri-Edgar Lavigueur (16 February 1867 – 29 October 1943) was a Liberal party member of the House of Commons of Canada and served as alderman and Mayor of Quebec City where he was born. His grandmother, Marguerite, was the daughter of General Sir Howard Douglas, 3rd Bt, Governor of New Brunswick.

Lavigueur was a merchant by career, a co-founder of the Lavigueur and Hutchison company which sold sewing machines and musical instruments.

In 1906, Lavigueur was elected an alderman for the Saint-Jean-Baptiste ward, in Quebec City. In 1916, he became the city's Mayor and remained in that position until 1920.

Lavigueur entered national politics in 1917 federal election with his election to Parliament at the Quebec County riding as a Laurier Liberal. He was re-elected there in the 1921 election with his party membership becoming the traditional Liberal party designation. In the 1925, 1926 and 1930 elections, he was re-elected at the Québec—Montmorency riding.

Having left federal politics at the end of his term in the 16th Canadian Parliament, Lavigueur already returned for further terms as Quebec City's mayor. He remained mayor until 1934, during which he chaired the centennial of the city's 1833 constitution.

== Electoral record ==
1921 Canadian federal election: Quebec County
| Party | Candidate | Votes |
|---|---|---|
| Liberal | Henri-Edgar Lavigueur | 6,843 |
| Independent | Armand Lavergne | 4,547 |

1917 Canadian federal election: Quebec County
| Party | Candidate | Votes |
|---|---|---|
| Opposition (Laurier Liberals) | Henri-Edgar Lavigueur | 4,799 |
| Government (Unionist) | Joseph-Édouard Barnard | 546 |
