= Georges Tanguay =

Canadian politician

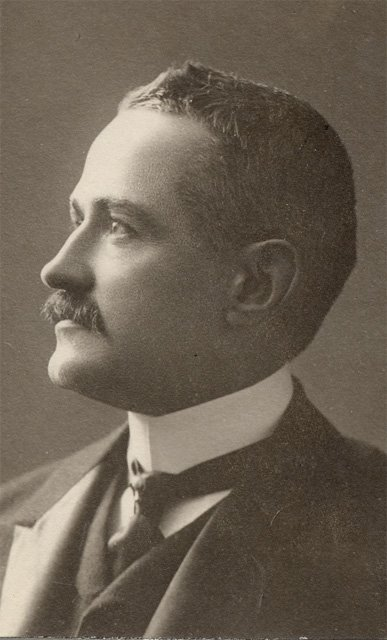

Legislative Assembly of Quebec member for Lac-Saint-Jean
- In office 1900–1904

24th Mayor of Quebec City
- In office 12 January 1906 – 1 March 1906
- Preceded by: Simon-Napoléon Parent
- Succeeded by: Jean-Georges Garneau

Personal details
- Born: 2 June 1856 Quebec City, Canada East
- Died: 21 September 1913 (aged 57) Quebec City, Quebec

Georges Tanguay (2 June 1856 – 21 September 1913) was a Canadian politician.

Born in Quebec City, Canada East, the son of Georges Tanguay and Adeline Mathieu, Tanguay was elected without opposition to the Legislative Assembly of Quebec for the electoral district of Lac-Saint-Jean in 1900. A Liberal, he was re-elected in 1904 and did not run in 1908. He was briefly mayor of Quebec City from 12 January to 1 March 1906.
