= John Lemesurier =

Canadian politician

Mayor John Lemesurier
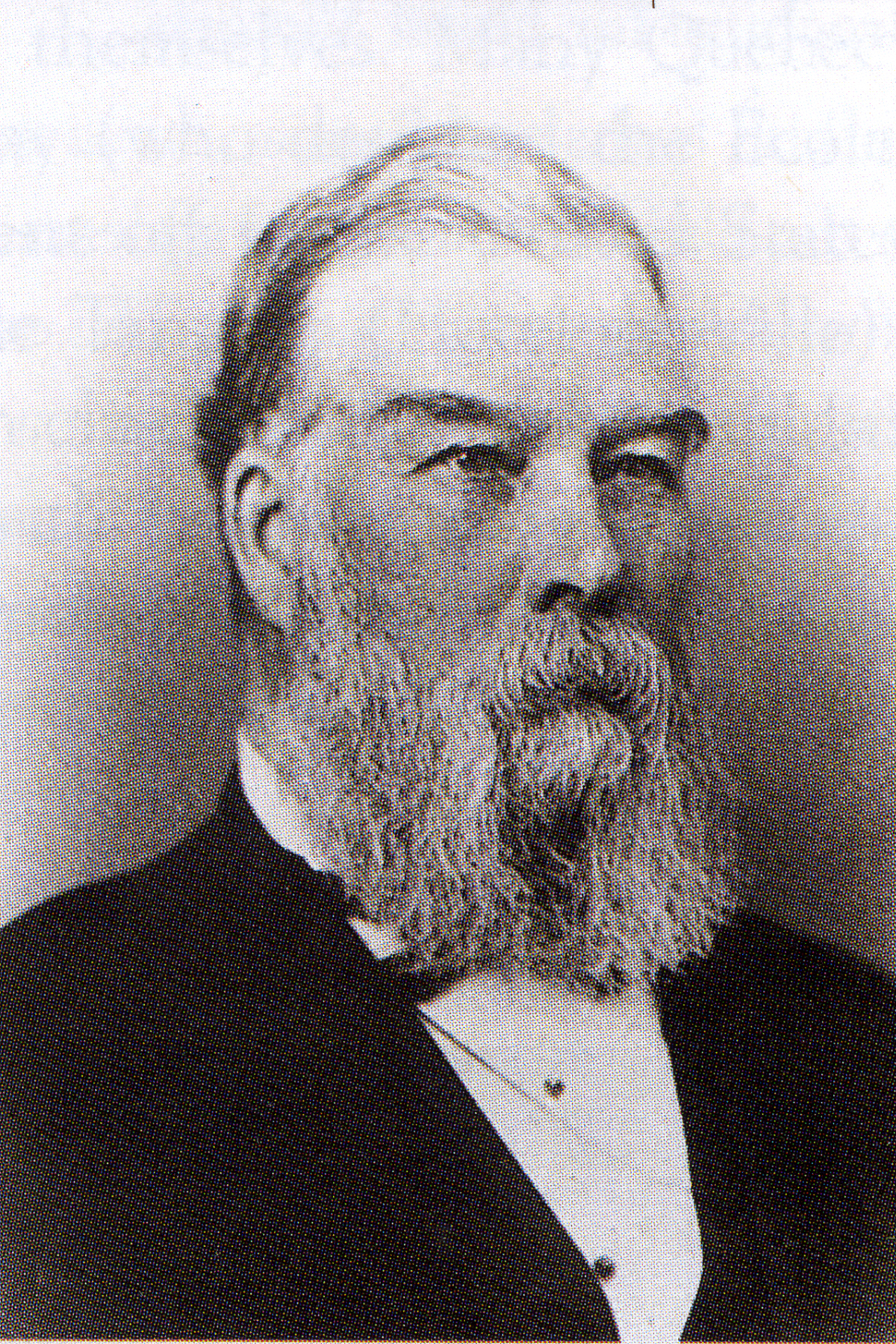

Mayor of Quebec City
- In office 10 January 1868 – 12 November 1869
- Preceded by: Joseph-Édouard Cauchon
- Succeeded by: William Hossak

Personal details
- Born: January 28, 1826 Gaspé, Lower Canada
- Died: June 26, 1891 (aged 65) Saint-Roch, Quebec City, Canada
- Resting place: Mount Hermon Cemetery, Sillery, Quebec City

John Lemesurier (or Le Mesurier or LeMesurier) (28 January 1826 — 26 June 1891) was a Canadian politician, serving as Mayor of Quebec City from January 1868 to November 1869.

== Biography ==
John Lemesurier was the son of Mary Thompson and Charles Lemesurier, the latter whom was born on Jersey, and served in the Royal Navy under the British Vice Admiral, Lord Horatio Nelson, for nine years and was present at the famed engagement at Trafalgar, where Lord Nelson lost his life at age 47.

John Lemesurier was born on January 28, 1826, in Gaspé, and in 1847, sailed on board the schooner "Antelope" for Quebec City. It was wrecked coming up the Saint Lawrence River. He returned to Gaspé and embarked on the "Mary;" he was then wrecked a second time. It is reported that, enduring great hardship and privation, Lemesurier and crew members walked over the snow and ice to Sault-au-Cochon. He stayed there with two crew members and worked for the Price family. The remaining crew members headed for Quebec City.

The following spring, Lemesurier crossed to the south shore and made his way on foot to Quebec, then returned to the fishery business in Gaspé. Young Lemesurier set out a third time for Quebec City. The schooner took 21 days, but this time he made it to his destination. His first job was with a Mr. Withall who became vice president of the Quebec Bank. In the second year a trifling increase was made to his small salary. Finally, Withall sold his business to Lemesurier, who made a success of it. Next he started an oakum manufactory, probably to help a brother, but it did not prosper.

From January 1861 to January 1868, he was a member of the Quebec City Council, and in December 1867, was elected mayor with the support of the working class, defeating the incumbent, Joseph Cauchon, who later became governor of Manitoba. Following Lemesurier's first term, the people of Quebec re-elected him by acclamation. During the first year of his mayoralty, John Lemesurier, delivered the welcome address to H. R. H. Prince Arthur and dined with him at a dinner given by Sir Narcisse Belleau at the Stadacona Club. While Lemesurier retained office as chief magistrate, a labor riot broke out. He was ordered to read the Riot Act, but this he refused to do. Instead, he courageously went amidst the rioters and, by diplomatic persuasion, induced them to disperse. Because armed troops had been ordered up, Lemesurier's cool headed daring probably saved bloodshed. He left politics in 1869, to take care of his tobacco venture that was in financial distress.

Mr. Lemesurier was actively engaged in Liberal party politics, and in October 1877, was asked to introduce Wilfrid Laurier to a meeting that took place in his store. In his introduction, he is reported to have "made a very able speech against the corrupt government to which Mr. Laurier was opposing his energy and talents," and "spoke in felicitous terms of the great reforms made by the reform parties all over the world, and said that if the just measures of reformers had been carried out, we would not have discontent or disaffection anywhere."

John Lemesurier married Marie Sylvain of Quebec, a French Canadian Catholic who was 12-years his senior, and they had five children. In 1870, he opened a brewery and tannery, but not satisfied with the results, he gave them up and, in 1873, went into tobacco manufacturing, taking his sons William and Henry as partners. This enterprise became one of the largest of its type in the province.

In addition, Lemesurier became owner of fairly extensive real estate holdings. A biographer, writing in a flowery 19th-century style, gives John Lemesurier very high marks for his accomplishments in Quebec City, saying, "Possibly, in Quebec City, there is no man stands higher 'rated' amongst the banking community, with whom he has always done business, than John Lemesurier." His tobacco company, Lemesurier and Sons, was found to be worth around $10,000 around 1890, which was then appreciable.

After a year-long illness and at the age of 65-years-old, John Lemesurier died on June 26, 1891, at his residence on rue Saint-François Est in the Saint-Roch neighbourhood of Quebec City. He is buried next to his wife, Marie, in Mount Hermon Cemetery, located in Quebec City's Sillery neighbourhood.
