= Louis-Édouard Glackmeyer =

Canadian politician and musician

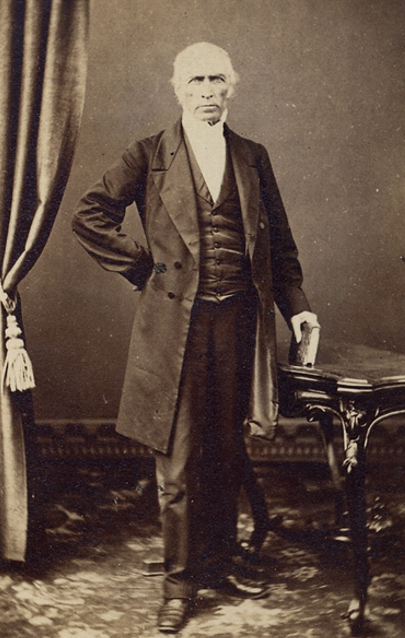
- Born: December 7, 1793; Quebec City, Lower Canada
- Died: February 9, 1881 (aged 87); Quebec City, Quebec
- Education: Petit Séminaire de Québec
- Occupations: notary, law clerk
- Spouse: Marie-Henriette Lagueux
- Father: Frédéric-Henri Glackmeyer
- Relatives: Étienne-Claude Lagueux, father-in-law

Member of Quebec City Council for Saint-Charles
- In office 1833–1845

Member of Quebec City Council for Saint-Pierre
- In office 1854–1856

Louis-Édouard Glackmeyer (December 7, 1793 – February 9, 1881) was a Canadian notary, flautist, and municipal councilor.

Glackmeyer was a member of the Quebec City Council from 1833 to 1845 (St. Charles Ward) and from 1854 to 1856 (St. Pierre Ward).

Glackmeyer was also an accomplished flautist.

== Personal ==
He was a son of Frederick Glackmeyer, a German-born music educator, and MarieAnne O'Neil.
