= George Garneau =

Canadian politician

Sir Jean-Georges Garneau
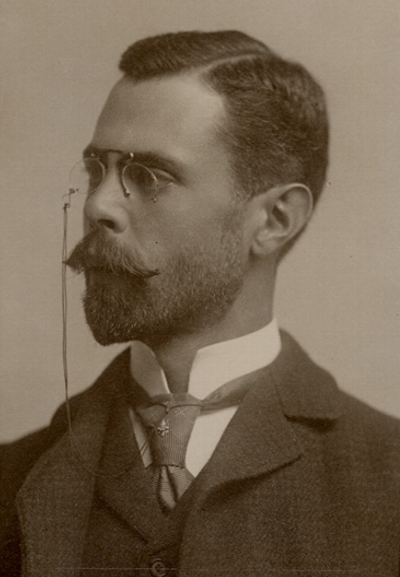

25th Mayor of Quebec City
- In office 1 March 1906 – 1 March 1910
- Preceded by: Georges Tanguay
- Succeeded by: Olivier-Napoléon Drouin

Personal details
- Born: 19 November 1864
- Died: 5 February 1944 (aged 79) Quebec City, Canada East
- Profession: railroad engineer, professor

Sir Jean-Georges Garneau (19 November 1864 – 5 February 1944) was a Canadian politician, the mayor of Quebec City from 1906 to 1910.

Sir Georges Garneau was a railroad engineer involved in the construction of track between Lac Saint-Jean and Quebec City. In 1904, he became an analytical chemistry professor at Université Laval, before becoming Quebec City's mayor in 1906. From 1908 to 1939, he served as the first president of the National Battlefields Commission, which manages the Plains of Abraham site in Quebec City.
