= Olivier-Napoléon Drouin =

Canadian politician

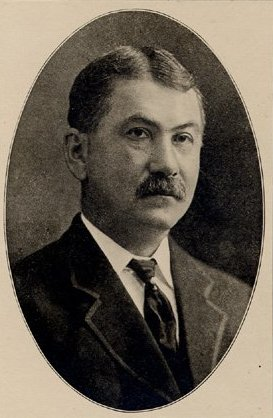

Alderman of Quebec City, Saint-Roch ward
- In office 1896–1910

26th Mayor of Quebec City
- In office 1 March 1910 – 1 March 1916
- Preceded by: Jean-Georges Garneau
- Succeeded by: Henri-Edgar Lavigueur

Personal details
- Profession: tobacco producer

Olivier-Napoléon Drouin (1862–1934) was a Canadian politician, the mayor of Quebec City from 1910 to 1916. He also initiated the Rock City Tobacco company with his brothers Alexis and Edmond.

After representing Quebec City's Saint-Roch ward as alderman since 1896, Drouin won the 1910 mayoralty contest with a 1328 vote margin over his opponent, federal politician Philippe-Auguste Choquette. Drouin won re-election to successive terms in office in 1912 and 1914. During his terms as mayor, he oversaw the annexation of the communities of Belvedère, Limoilou and Saint-Malo to Quebec City.

After leaving the mayor's posting in 1916, Drouin chaired the Commission des chemins du Québec (Commission of routes of Quebec) between 1917 and 1922.
