= Bruno Marchand =

Mayor of Quebec City since 2021

His Worship Bruno Marchand
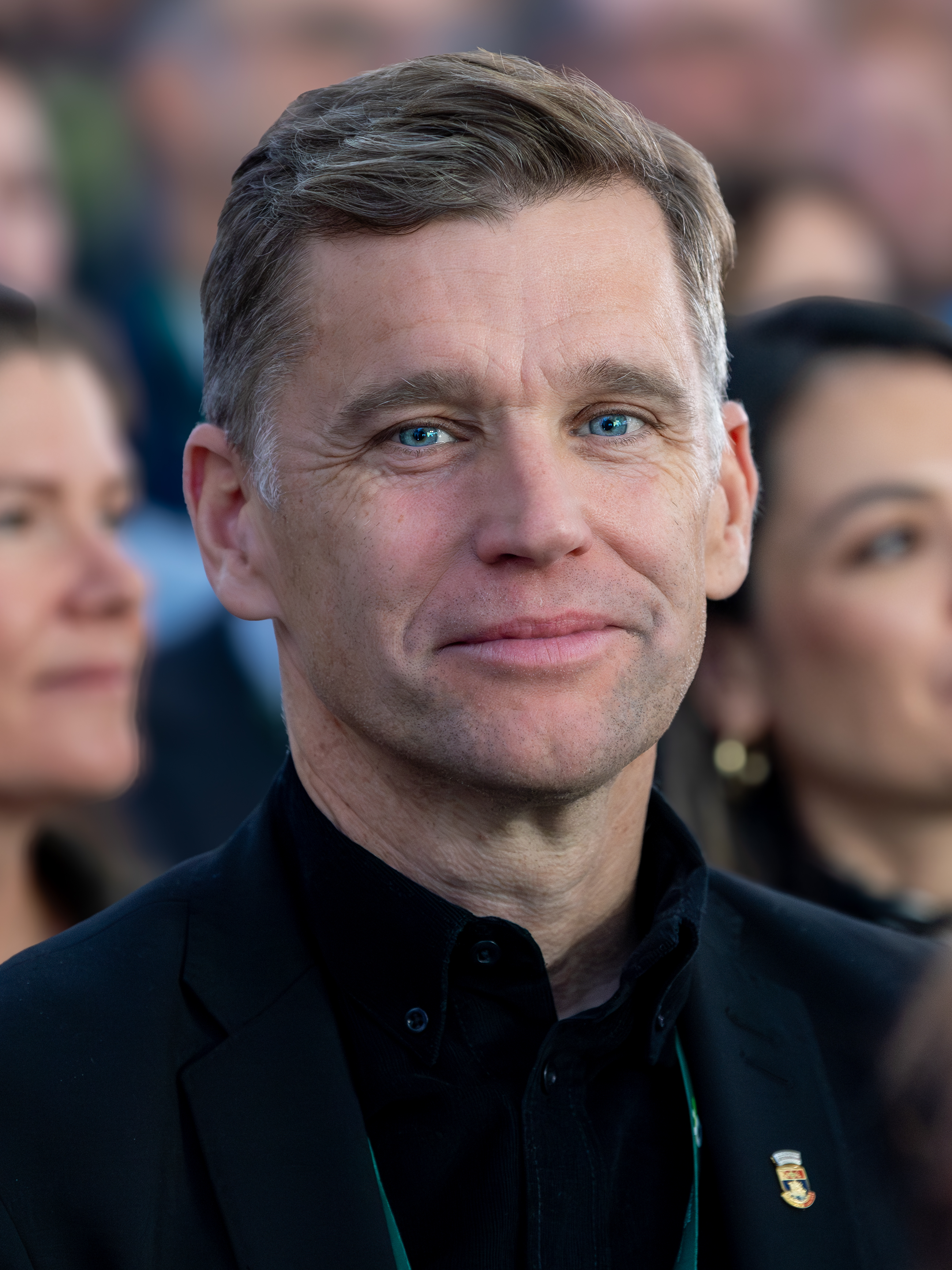
- Marchand in 2025

Mayor of Quebec City
- Incumbent
- Assumed office November 14, 2021
- Preceded by: Regis Labeaume

Personal details
- Born: May 22, 1972 (age 54) Quebec City, Quebec, Canada
- Party: Québec forte et fière
- Education: Université Laval

Bruno Marchand ([bʁyno maʁʃɑ̃]; born May 22, 1972) is a Canadian politician who currently serves as mayor of Quebec City, succeeding Régis Labeaume in the 2021 Quebec City municipal election.

== Biography ==
Marchand was born in Quebec City and grew up in the Lairet neighbourhood of La Cité-Limoilou. He received a degree in philosophy from Université Laval in 1995 and a certification in social work from Cégep de Sainte-Foy in 1998.

Following graduation, Marchand served as coordinator of student life at Cégep de Sainte-Foy from 1999 to 2008. From 2008 to 2014, Marchand worked for the Quebec Association for the Prevention of Suicide. In 2014, Marchand became Director of Centraide Québec Chaudière-Appalaches et Bas-Saint-Laurent, a position he held until March 2021. Prior to his role as president, Marchand had served on the board of directors for the organization for ten years.

=== Political career ===
In November 2020, a Léger-Le Journal de Québec poll mentioned Marchand as a possible candidate for Mayor of Quebec, receiving 1% support among potential voters. In February 2021, the rumours of his candidacy became more serious. On March 23, 2021, Marchand left his position at Centraide Québec-Bas-Saint-Laurent.

Two days later, Marchand registered a new political party with Élections Québec. The party, named Québec forte et fière, had Marchand as its leader. On April 15, 2021, Marchand announced his candidacy for mayor of Quebec in a press conference at a community centre in Limoilou.

Elections were held in Quebec City on November 7, 2021. As polls closed on election night, around 8:30pm, local television networks declared Marie-Josée Savard the victor, with a 14% lead over Marchand. Following this announcement, Savard made a victory speech to her supporters and the press. Around 10:00 p.m., TVA reversed its prediction of Savard's victory due to a reduced vote margin between her and Marchand. By 10:40pm, Marchand took the lead in votes and eventually won the election by 834 votes. Due to the surprise win by Marchand, Savard's campaign considered a recount, but conceded defeat the next day.

On November 14, 2021, Marchand was sworn in as the 38th Mayor of Quebec in the presence of all the city councillors at the Quebec City Armory. He is the first mayor since Lucien Borne in 1938, to come from downtown Quebec City.

== Personal life ==
Marchand lives in Sainte-Foy with his partner and two children. His parents died in 2007 and 2013 respectively.
