= Renouveau municipal de Québec =

Political party in the city of Québec, Quebec, Canada

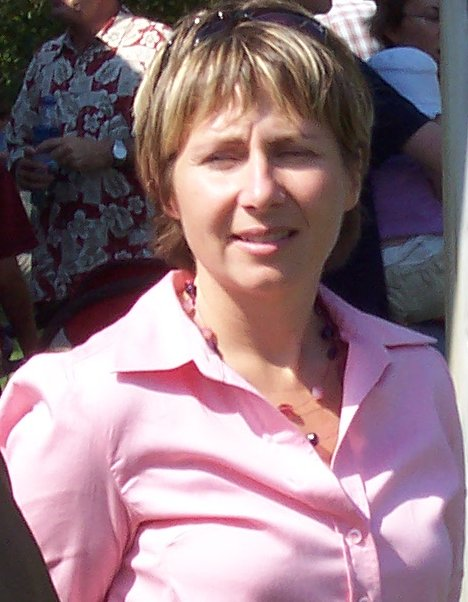
Ann Bourget, the party's last councillor.

The Renouveau municipal de Québec (Municipal renewal of Québec) was a political party in the city of Québec, Quebec, Canada that contested municipal elections. It was created on February 26, 2001, after the amalgamation of Quebec City and surrounding suburban municipalities. In 2007, the party held 24 of the 37 seats on the City Council. Its last leader was councillor Ann Bourget (the former Leader of Opposition from November 2005 to August 2007). Québec's former mayor, Jacques Joli-Coeur, was also from the Renouveau municipal de Québec.
