= Télesphore Simard (Quebec City politician) =

Canadian businessman and politician

Mayor Télesphore Simard
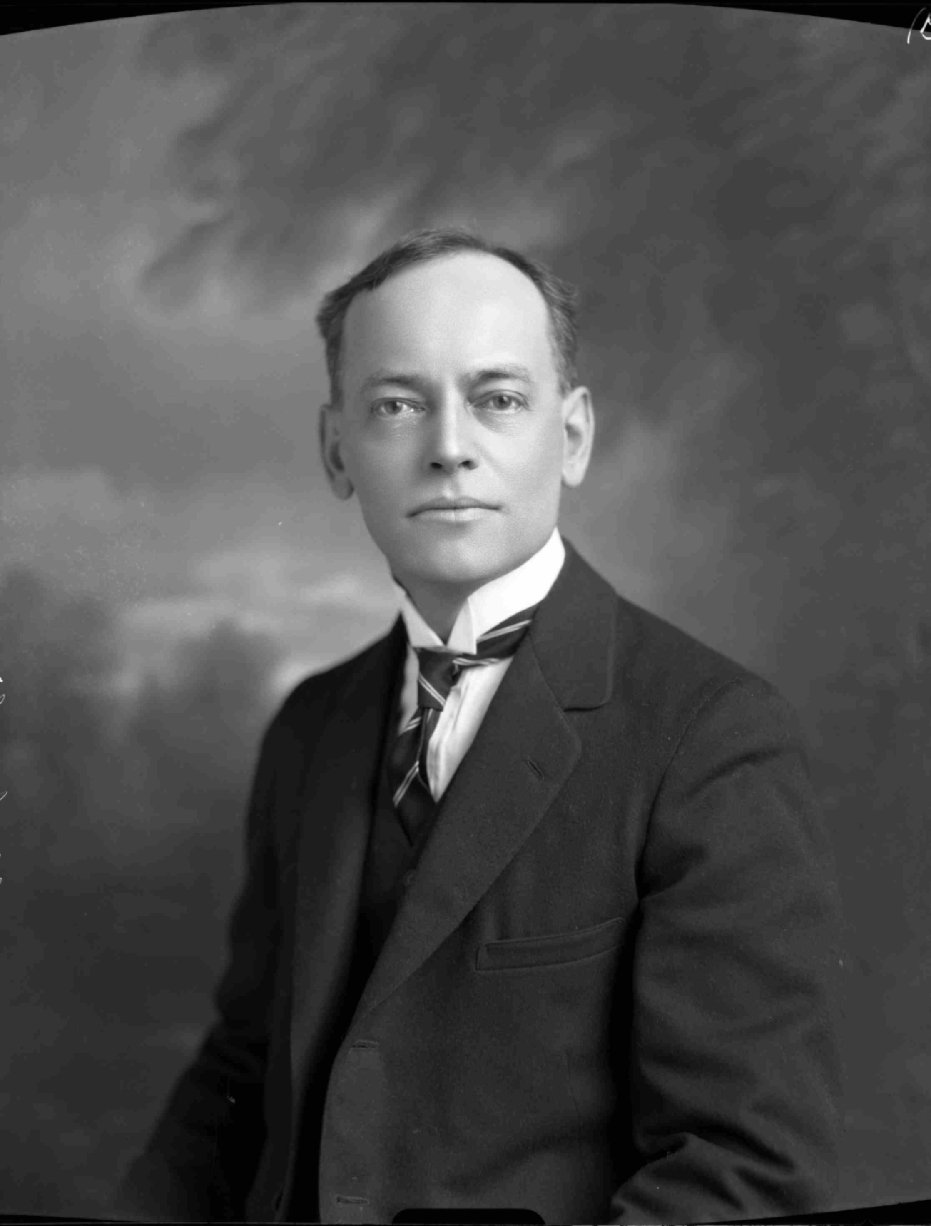
- Télesphore Simard

30th Mayor of Quebec City
- In office 7 December 1927 – 1 March 1928
- Preceded by: Valmont Martin
- Succeeded by: Joseph-Oscar Auger

Personal details
- Born: 9 November 1878 Saint-Joachim, Quebec
- Died: 10 May 1955 (age 76) Québec, Quebec
- Spouse(s): Rosalie Déchène (1899); Marie-Jeanne Forgues (1916)
- Profession: Businessman

Télesphore Simard (1878–1955) was a Canadian businessman and politician, serving as mayor of Quebec City from December 1927 to March 1928.

== Biography ==
He was the son of Louis Simard and Isabelle Brown. He studied at académie commerciale. After working in different stores, he opened in 1911 his own business, Simard et Carmichaël. He prospered and later bought the Syndicat de Lévis and several other stores in the clothing business.

He was elected without opposition to the charge of alderman (échevin) in the Saint-Roch ward of Québec in the 1924 election and again in the 1926 election. After the resignation of mayor Valmont Martin, Simard became mayor when the city council chose him on 6 December 1927, to complete the mayoral term of office ending 1 March 1928. During his short administration, the city adopted bylaws for borrowing substantial sums of money to finance public works, including modifications to the aqueduct and drainage system, building an annex to the Hôpital civique and building a bridge on the river Lairet.

Simard was defeated by Oscar Auger in the 20 February 1928 city election by a 7046 to 4752 vote.

After his term as mayor, Simard's family grew to at least 24 children by 1931. He was married at least twice.
