= List of mayors of Quebec City =

The Mayor of Quebec City (French: Maire de Québec) has been the highest elected official of the Quebec City government since the incorporation of the city in 1832.

== List ==
The following is a list of the mayors of Quebec City, Quebec, Canada.

Name		From	To	Duration	Political party
1	Elzéar Bédard	May 1, 1833	March 31, 1834	10 months and 30 days	N/A
2	René-Édouard Caron	March 31, 1834	April 9, 1836	2 years and 9 days	N/A
	René-Édouard Caron	August 15, 1840	February 9, 1846	5 years and 179 days	N/A
3	George O'Kill Stuart	February 9, 1846	February 11, 1850	4 years and 2 days	N/A
4	Narcisse-Fortunat Belleau	February 11, 1850	February 14, 1853	3 years and 3 days	N/A
5	Ulric-Joseph Tessier	February 14, 1853	February 13, 1854	364 days	N/A
6	Charles Joseph Alleyn	February 13, 1854	February 12, 1855	364 days	N/A
7	Joseph Morrin	February 12, 1855	January 22, 1856	323 days	N/A
8	Olivier Robitaille	January 22, 1856	January 19, 1857	363 days	N/A
9	Joseph Morrin (second term)	January 19, 1857	January 18, 1858	364 days	N/A
10	Sir Hector-Louis Langevin	January 19, 1858	January 22, 1861	3 years and 3 days	N/A
11	Thomas Pope	January 22, 1861	January 29, 1863	2 years and 7 days	N/A
12	Adolphe Guillet dit Tourangeau	July 3, 1863	January 12, 1866	2 years and 6 months and 9 days	N/A
13	Joseph-Édouard Cauchon	January 12, 1866	January 10, 1868	1 year and 11 months and 29 days	N/A
14	John Lemesurier	January 10, 1868	November 12, 1869	1 year and 10 months and 2 days	N/A
15	William Hossak	November 12, 1869	January 7, 1870	1 month and 25 days	N/A
16	Adolphe Guillet dit Tourangeau (second term)	January 10, 1870	May 2, 1870	3 months and 23 days	N/A
17	Pierre Garneau	May 2, 1870	May 4, 1874	4 years and 2 days	N/A
18	Owen Murphy	May 4, 1874	May 6, 1878	4 years and 2 days	N/A
19	Robert Chambers	May 4, 1878	May 3, 1880	1 year and 11 months and 30 days	N/A
20	Jean-Docile Brousseau	May 3, 1880	May 1, 1882	1 year and 11 months and 29 days	N/A
21	Sir François-Charles-Stanislas Langelier	May 1, 1882	March 1, 1890	7 years and 10 months	N/A
22	Jules-Joseph-Taschereau Frémont	March 1, 1890	April 2, 1894	4 years and 1 month and 1 day	N/A
23	Simon-Napoléon Parent	April 2, 1894	January 12, 1906	11 years and 9 months and 10 days	N/A
24	Georges Tanguay	January 12, 1906	March 1, 1906	1 month and 20 days	N/A
25	Sir Jean-Georges Garneau	March 1, 1906	March 1, 1910	4 years	N/A
26	Olivier-Napoléon Drouin	March 1, 1910	March 1, 1916	6 years	N/A
27	Henri-Edgar Lavigueur	March 1, 1916	February 20, 1920	3 years and 11 months and 19 days	N/A
28	Joseph-Octave Samson	March 1, 1920	March 1, 1926	6 years	N/A
29	Valmont Martin	March 1, 1926	December 7, 1927	1 year and 9 months and 6 days	N/A
30	Télesphore Simard	December 7, 1927	March 1, 1928	2 months and 25 days	N/A
31	Joseph-Oscar Auger	March 1, 1928	March 1, 1930	2 years	N/A
32	Henri-Edgar Lavigueur (second term)	February 26, 1930	January 26, 1934	3 years and 11 months	N/A
33	Joseph-Ernest Grégoire	March 1, 1934	March 1, 1938	4 years	N/A
34	Lucien-Hubert Borne	March 1, 1938	November 17, 1953	15 years and 8 months and 16 days	N/A
35	Wilfrid Hamel	December 15, 1953	December 1, 1965	11 years and 11 months and 17 days	N/A
36	Gilles Lamontagne	December 1, 1965	December 1, 1977	12 years	P.C.
37	Jean Pelletier	December 1, 1977	November 5, 1989	11 years and 11 months and 4 days	P.C.
38	Jean-Paul L'Allier	November 5, 1989	November 19, 2005	16 years, 1 month and 26 days	R.P. (until 2001); R.M.Q. (after 2001)
39	Andrée Boucher	November 19, 2005	August 24, 2007	1 year, 9 months and 18 days	Ind.
40	Jacques Joli-Cœur	August 24, 2007	December 8, 2007	3 months and 14 days	R.M.Q.
41	Régis Labeaume	December 8, 2007	November 14, 2021	13 years, 11 months, 6 days	Ind. (2007–2009); L'Équipe Labeaume (2009–2021)
42	Bruno Marchand	November 14, 2021			Q.F.F

== Facts ==
- The first woman mayor of Quebec City was elected in 2005, 180 years after the creation of the city.
- Mayor Jean-Paul L'Allier has been the longest-serving mayor in the city's history, serving more than 16 years.
- The city was administered by a justice of the peace from 1836 to 1840.
- Party politics was introduced to city politics in the 1960s by Gilles Lamontagne's Progrès civique de Québec.

== Legend ==
N/A : Non applicable

P.C. : Progrès civique de Québec

Q.F.F : Québec forte et fière

R.P. : Rassemblement populaire

Ind. : Independent

R.M.Q. : Renouveau municipal de Québec

== See also ==
- Quebec City Council
