= Président-directeur général (France) =

Corporate executive position

In France, Quebec, and New Brunswick, the président-directeur général (PDG) is the highest ranking officer in a société anonyme (SA) operating under a single-tier board of directors, i.e., without a supervisory board. The président-directeur général combines the functions of chairman of the board of directors and chief executive officer (general director, or DG) within the company. The title is usually back-translated as simply "President" in English-speaking sources; French, unlike English, does not distinguish between the terms "chairman" and "president," translating both as "président." More direct translations would be "President and CEO", "Chairman and CEO", or "President and Chairman".

The PDG carries out their duties under the control of the assemblée générale (general assembly), which is composed of the board of directors and the shareholders.

These functions are sometimes performed by two separate individuals, often by one person in smaller companies. This combination of functions allows the PDG to have the widest powers:

- As directeur général, the PDG is responsible for the operational management of the company;
- As chair of the board, the PDG oversees the establishment of major directions in the direction of the company.

The PDG has the power to bind the company vis-à-vis third parties in the interest of the company and within the limit of the company's charter.

According to a study by the firm Proxinvest, published in 2018, 57.5% of CAC 40 companies are headed by a PDG, against only 10% of companies in the STOXX Europe 600 index. It is therefore a uniquely French executive management style.

== History ==
In France, the creation of the position of PDG dates to the Vichy Regime, who reformed the law of 1867 on the operation of sociétés anonymes by reinforcing the personal responsibility of the chairman of the board of directors (law of September 18, 1940) and especially by creating the function of président-directeur général, who assumes authority in the company by mixing the control functions of the president and the functions of general management, replacing the former chair of the board with a generally honorific role (Laws of November 16, 1940 and March 4, 1943). The PDG must be a physical person and is declared a "commerçant" - "trader" and therefore financially liable under the law of November 1940.

== Appointment and dismissal of the président-directeur général ==
The PDG is appointed and dismissed by the board of directors, he or she can be dismissed "ad nutum" - that is to say at any time and without cause.

Nevertheless, jurisprudence sometimes grants compensation for the benefit of the unduly dismissed PDG.

The "ad nutum" dismissal prerogative recognized by the board of directors is sometimes mitigated by a so-called "golden parachute" clause included in the contract concluded between the company and its PDG, providing for automatic compensation in case of dismissal.

== Legal texts ==
Since the passage of the Nouvelle régulation économique (NRE) - New Economic Regulation - Act of 2001, the Commercial Code distinguishes two functions (which can be exercised by one person):

- The directeur général (art. L. 225-56 I):
  le directeur général est investi des pouvoirs les plus étendus pour agir en toute circonstance au nom de la société. Il exerce ces pouvoirs dans la limite de l'objet social et sous réserve de ceux que la loi attribue expressément aux assemblées d'actionnaires et au conseil d'administration - the director-general is vested with the broadest powers to act in all circumstances on behalf of the corporation. He or she exercises these powers within the limits of the corporate purpose and subject to those which the law expressly grants to shareholders' meetings and to the board of directors;
- The président of the board of directors (art. L. 225-51):
  le président du conseil d'administration représente le conseil d'administration. Il organise et dirige les travaux de celui-ci, dont il rend compte à l'assemblée générale. Il veille au bon fonctionnement des organes de la société et s'assure, en particulier, que les administrateurs sont en mesure de remplir leur mission - the chair (or président) of the board of directors represents the board of directors. He or she organizes and directs the work of the latter, which he or she reports to the general assembly. He or she ensures the proper functioning of the corporate bodies and ensures, in particular, that the directors are able to fulfill their mission;

Article 225-56 II specifies that:

en accord avec le directeur général, le conseil d'administration détermine l'étendue et la durée des pouvoirs conférés aux directeurs généraux délégués - in agreement with the director-general, the board of directors determines the scope and duration of the powers granted to the deputy directors-general.

== See also ==
- Chief executive officer
- Directeur général
