= Jean-François Gosselin =

Canadian politician (born 1975)

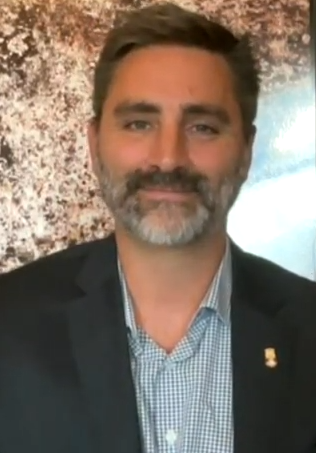
- Jean-François Gosselin, 2023

MNA for Jean-Lesage
- In office April 25, 2007 – November 5, 2008
- Preceded by: Michel Després
- Succeeded by: André Drolet

Personal details
- Born: April 17, 1975 (age 51) Quebec City, Quebec
- Party: Action démocratique du Québec

Jean-François Gosselin (born April 17, 1975 in Quebec City, Quebec) is a politician from Quebec, Canada. He was an Action démocratique du Québec Member of the National Assembly for the electoral district of Jean-Lesage from 2007 to 2008. He was the leader of the opposition on Quebec City Council from 2017 to 2021, and sat on council until 2025.

He graduated from the Rensselaer Polytechnic Institute in Troy, New York in 1999 where he obtained a bachelor and a master's degree in business administration. He then worked for sales and business development as well as in development and partnership strategies for 4 years including with Eastman Kodak. He was the manager of the Quebec City soccer league and was also a professional hockey player for the Shreveport Mudbugs of the Western Professional Hockey League in 1999. In the community, he worked for the Quebec Fondation for cystic fibrosis and made promotion tours in the United States for promoting French in community organization and schools.

Gosselin was first elected in the 2007 election with 40% of the vote. Liberal incumbent and cabinet member Michel Després finished second with 29% of the vote. Gosselin took office on April 12, 2007. He was defeated in the 2008 election.

Gosselin was a candidate for the Quebec Liberal Party in the 2012 election.
