= United Way of Canada =

Canadian nonprofit organization

United Way Centraide Canada
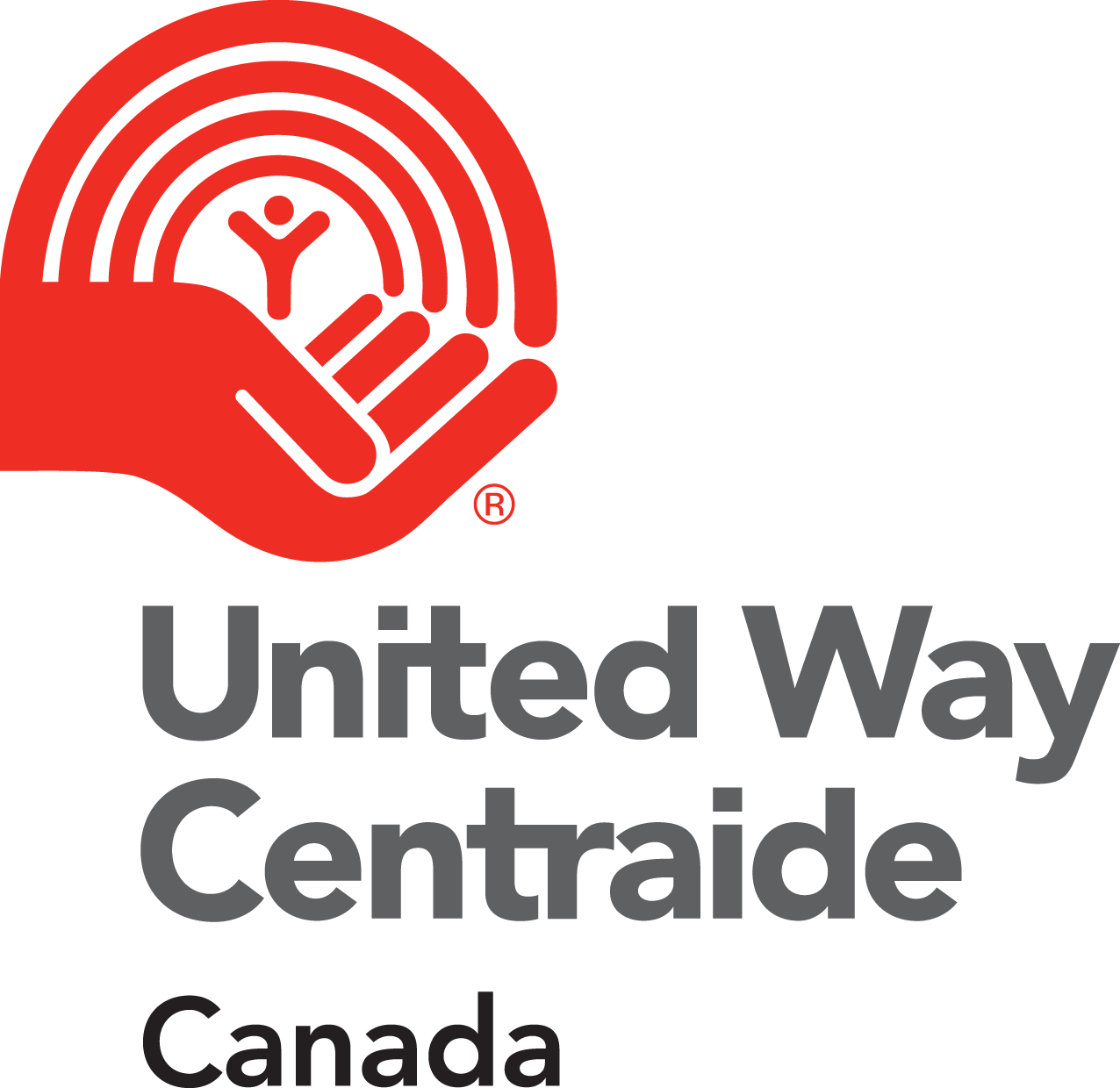
- Formation: 1917; 109 years ago
- Type: Nonprofit
- Headquarters: 116 Albert Street, Suite 900 Ottawa, Ontario K1P 5G3
- Region served: Canada
- President/CEO: Dan Clement
- Main organ: National Board of Directors
- Website: www.unitedway.ca

United Way Centraide Canada (French: Centraide United Way Canada) is the national organization for the autonomous, volunteer-based United Ways and Centraides across Canada.

The United Way Movement in Canada is a federated network of local United Way offices serving more than 5,000 communities across Canada, each registered as its own nonprofit organization and governed by an independent volunteer-led local Board of Directors. Each United Way works locally to raise funds and invest in improving lives in its community.

In French, both in Quebec and across Canada, the organization is known as Centraide. The organization often uses the United Way and Centraide names together, recognizing the bilingual nature of the country's culture and people.

United Way Centraide Canada is the national office and has a distinct role to provide leadership, guidance and support to local United Ways across the country. Together, local United Ways and United Way Centraide Canada form the United Way Movement.

== National office ==
The National Office, which was founded in 1939, is located in Ottawa, Ontario. As the national organization, United Way Centraide Canada represents local United Ways and Centraides within Canada's voluntary sector, internationally and provides services such as leadership training and education opportunities. The national organization convenes local United Ways and Centraides on a biennial basis at its annual conference, for the purposes of professional development training, the sharing of best practices and learning from leading thinkers.

== History ==
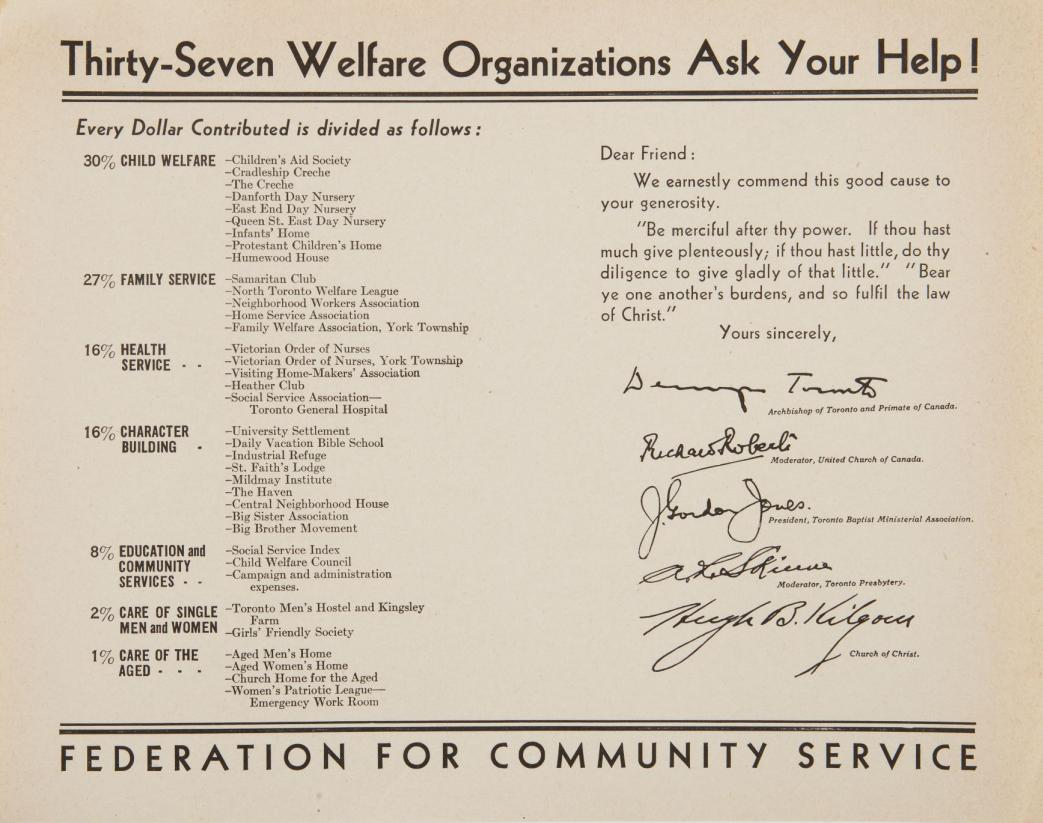
A broadside published in the 1930s by the Federation for Community Service in Toronto, showing how donations are distributed to member agencies

The United Way Centraide movement began in 1917, when charities in Montreal and Toronto started community collectives inspired by similar activities in the United States. In particular, various clergy in Denver were trying to raise money individually to support their community, but started working together in 1887 when they realized that they could have a greater impact if they worked together to raise and distribute funds. This approach began to be adopted in Canada during the turmoil of the First World War period.

Other collectives were initiated in other parts of the country over time, under a variety of names – including Red Feather (or Plume Rouge in French), Community Chest, Fédération des oeuvres de charité and the United Appeal. It was not until the 1970s that these organizations took the name of United Way and Centraide (in 1973 and 1975 respectively).

During the COVID-19 pandemic in Canada, the federal government distributed money through United Ways to help people at risk.

How United Ways in Canada allocate their funds has been discussed in an academic journal.

== See also ==
- Homelessness in Canada
- Poverty in Canada
- United Way of America
