= Régis Labeaume =

Canadian businessman, writer and politician (born 1956)

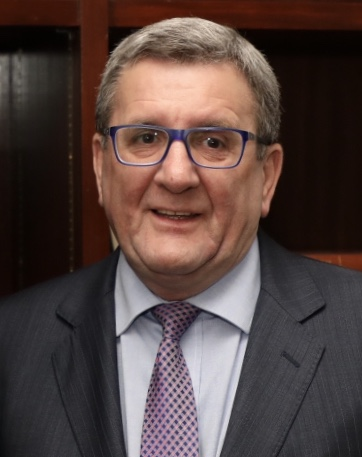
- Labeaume in 2017

Mayor of Quebec City
- In office December 8, 2007 – November 14, 2021
- Preceded by: Jacques Joli-Cœur (interim)
- Succeeded by: Bruno Marchand

Personal details
- Born: May 2, 1956 (age 69) Roberval, Quebec, Canada
- Party: Équipe Labeaume

Régis Labeaume (French pronunciation: [ʁeʒis labom]; born May 2, 1956) is a Canadian businessman, writer and politician. He served as mayor of Quebec City from 2007 to 2021. He was first elected on December 2, 2007, after the death of former mayor Andrée Boucher. He was reelected in 2009, 2013, and 2017.

== Early life ==
Labeaume holds a bachelor's degree in sociology from the Université Laval. Prior to being mayor, Labeaume was a local businessman and chair of the Fondation de l’entrepreneurship organisation since 2003 and worked primarily in the mining industry. He was previously the political adviser of former Communications Minister and former Parti Québécois MNA of the riding of Vanier, Jean-François Bertrand from 1980 to 1983. He also collaborated to two books on the Quebec mining industry and on small and medium enterprises.

== Municipal politics in Quebec City ==
In 2005, he ran for the leader of the municipal political party Renouveau municipal de Québec but lost to 2007 candidate Claude Larose.

=== First mayoral term ===
Labeaume was elected on December 2, 2007, in a special election following the death of Andrée Boucher. He was elected with over 59 percent of the vote, defeating candidate Ann Bourget who was the front-runner until the campaign's last few days. She finished second with 32% of the votes, followed by former Quebec Liberal Party Minister of Justice and lawyer Marc Bellemare. Labeaume obtained the support of key local figures, including Marc Boucher, husband of the late Andrée Boucher, and former mayor Gilles Lamontagne.

Throughout his first term as mayor, Labeaume focused on making the city a major tourist destination. He was keen on the idea of a New Quebec City Amphitheatre. With the 400th Anniversary of the city in 2008, Quebec City's image changed in the eyes of many. After the festivities, the mayor promised to keep investing to make Quebec City an appealing destination.

During his first mandate as mayor, Labeaume also developed a reputation for speaking his mind and not always using the right words in front of the media. In October 2009 he made some scathing comments about Federal Minister Josée Verner. On a pre-recorded interview on Télé-Québec, he declared, “I get along well with Ms. Verner, but sometimes I could just smack her. Those culture cuts, I just don't agree with them.” He later made public excuses and explained that he only wanted to express his anger about the recent cuts in culture by the federal government.

A study based on 68000 texts and reports broadcast in Quebec between April 1, 2008, and March 31, 2009, showed that Labeaume was the mayor with the most media coverage in Quebec, with 54.4% of the coverage. In another study in 2008, Labeaume ranked 10th in a list of the most mediatised personalities in Quebec, along with the then newly elected American president Barack Obama, Guy Carbonneau (coach of the Montreal Canadiens), and Stephen Harper.

=== Second mayoral term ===
On November 1, 2009, on the night of Québec's municipal elections, Labeaume was reelected by an overwhelming majority of 79,7% against 8,6% for the radio host Jean-François Jeff Fillion and 8,1% for Yonnel Bonaventure and the Défi Vert de Québec party. Labeaume's party, l'Équipe Labeaume, also elected a councillor in 25 of the 27 districts. Only the districts of Vieux-Québec-Montcalm and Saint-Sacrement-Belvédère elected independent councillors. With this vast majority at the city council, Labeaume declared his intention to make Quebec City the most appealing city in Canada and that in 15 years, the city would be greener, more efficient and more active.

=== Third mayoral term ===
On November 3, 2013, Labeaume was reelected with 74.1% of the vote and 18 out of 21 candidates from l'Équipe Labeaume were elected councillors.

Labeaume has stated that he supports legislation banning the wearing of the niqāb or burqa in public spaces.

=== A new Colisée in Québec ===
A couple of months before the elections of December 2009, on October 16 Labeaume announced his intention to go forward with the project of the new indoor arena. He announced a new Colisée of 18000 seats would be built besides the old Colisée Pepsi. The estimated $400 million cost would be paid in part by the federal and provincial governments. When asked if this kind of announcement was justified before the elections, Labeaume answered he wanted to be transparent and that the announcement should be seen as an electoral engagement.

On September 10, 2010, Quebec premier Jean Charest announced the province would be ready to pay 45% percent of the bill for the new arena if Ottawa would do the same. At this point, Labeaume and his team were still waiting for the federal answer.

In December 2010, after a couple of months of speculation, Prime Minister Harper announced the government had no intention of paying for these kinds of installations. The money would have to come from the private sector.

In March 2011, Labeaume announced that he was "passing the puck" to Pierre Karl Péladeau and the group Quebecor. The media empire engaged itself in using the new Colisée with or without an NHL team.

== Personal life ==
In March 2019, Labeaume announced that he has been diagnosed with prostate cancer.
