= Quebec City Council =

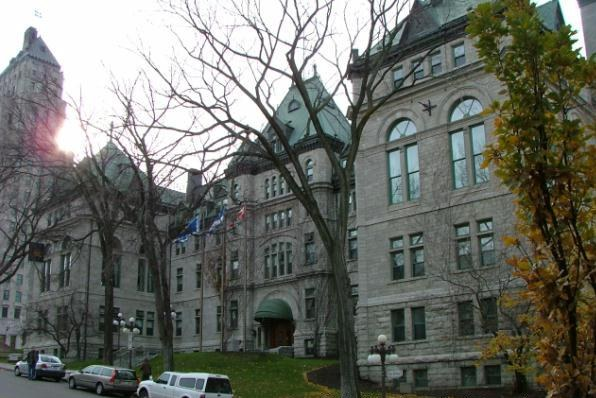
City Hall of Quebec City.

Quebec City Council (French: Conseil municipal de Québec) is the governing body in the mayor–council government in Quebec City, Quebec, Canada. The council consists of a mayor and of 21 representatives representing the 21 city council districts, with a president by borough in the elected representatives. The current council is composed of an equality of 8 Québec forte et fière councillors, led by the mayor Bruno Marchand. The main opposition party is Québec d'abord led by Claude Villeneuve, which has eight seats. Québec 21 has three seats.

== Current members ==
Elected in the 2025 Quebec City municipal election

Borough		District	Representative	Party
Mayor (at-large)			Bruno Marchand	Québec forte et fière
1	La Cité-Limoilou			
1	La Cité-Limoilou	Cap-aux-Diamants	Mélissa Coulombe-Leduc	Québec forte et fière
1	La Cité-Limoilou	Montcalm-Saint-Sacrement	Catherine Vallières-Roland	Québec forte et fière
1	La Cité-Limoilou	Saint-Roch-Saint-Sauveur	Elainie Lepage	Québec forte et fière
1	La Cité-Limoilou	Limoilou	Raymond Poirier	Québec forte et fière
1	La Cité-Limoilou	Maizerets-Lairet	Marylou Boulianne	Québec forte et fière
2	Les Rivières			
2	Les Rivières	Vanier-Duberger	Clément Bourdeau	Québec forte et fière
2	Les Rivières	Neufchâtel-Lebourgneuf	Maxime Elmaleh	Québec forte et fière
2	Les Rivières	Saules–Les Méandres	Catherine Deschamps	Québec forte et fière
3	Sainte-Foy–Sillery–Cap-Rouge			
3	Sainte-Foy–Sillery–Cap-Rouge	Saint-Louis—Sillery	Marianne White	Québec forte et fière
3	Sainte-Foy–Sillery–Cap-Rouge	Plateau	Gabriel Dusablon	Québec forte et fière
3	Sainte-Foy–Sillery–Cap-Rouge	La Pointe-de-Sainte-Foy	Jean-Luc Lavoie	Québec forte et fière
3	Sainte-Foy–Sillery–Cap-Rouge	Cap-Rouge-Laurentien	Yannick Fauteux	Québec forte et fière
4	Charlesbourg			
4	Charlesbourg	Saint-Rodrigue	Claude Lavoie	Québec forte et fière
4	Charlesbourg	Louis-XIV	Marie-Pierre Boucher	Québec forte et fière
4	Charlesbourg	Monts	Raphaël Lebailly	Québec forte et fière
5	Beauport			
5	Beauport	Sainte-Thérèse-des-Lisieux	Mélanie Sauvé	Respect citoyens
5	Beauport	La Chute-Montmorency-Seigneurial	Elisa Verreault	Québec forte et fière
5	Beauport	Robert-Giffard	Éric Courtemanche Baril	Québec forte et fière
6	La Haute-Saint-Charles			
6	La Haute-Saint-Charles	Lac-Saint-Charles—Saint-Émile	Marc Roussin	Respect citoyens
6	La Haute-Saint-Charles	Loretteville-Les Châtels	Marie-Josée Asselin	Québec forte et fière
6	La Haute-Saint-Charles	Val-Bélair	Stéphane Lachance	Respect citoyens

* Borough presidents

== Former districts/wards ==
- Samuel-de-Champlain - replaced by Vieux-Québec—Montcalm
- St. Louis Ward - now Saint-Louis—Sillery District
- Saint-Roch Ward
- Saint-Charles Ward
- Saint-Pierre Ward

== See also ==
- Louis-Édouard Glackmeyer, 1833 to 1845 (St. Charles Ward), 1854 to 1856 (St. Pierre Ward)
