= 9th Quebec Legislature =

The 9th Legislative Assembly of Quebec was the provincial legislature in Quebec, Canada that existed from May 11, 1897, to December 7, 1900. The Quebec Liberal Party led by Félix-Gabriel Marchand was the governing party. The Liberals would hold on to power until 1936.

== Seats per political party ==
- After the 1897 elections

Affiliation	Members
Liberal	51
Conservative	23
Total	74
Government Majority	28

== Member list ==
This was the list of members of the Legislative Assembly of Quebec that were elected in the 1897 election:

Name	Party	Riding	First elected / previously elected	No. of terms
William Alexander Weir	Liberal	Argenteuil	1897	1st term
Joseph-Éna Girouard	Liberal	Arthabaska	1886	4th term
Milton McDonald	Conservative	Bagot	1890	3rd term
Henri-Séverin Béland	Liberal	Beauce	1897	1st term
Élie-Hercule Bisson	Liberal	Beauharnois	1873, 1886, 1892	6th term*
Arthur Plante (1898)	Conservative	Beauharnois	1898	1st term
Adélard Turgeon	Liberal	Bellechasse	1890	3rd term
Cuthbert-Alphonse Chênevert	Liberal	Berthier	1890, 1897	2nd term*
François-Xavier Lemieux	Liberal	Bonaventure	1878, 1883, (Note: Lévis) 1894	5th term*
William Henry Clapperton (1897)	Liberal	Bonaventure	1897	1st term
Henry Thomas Duffy	Liberal	Brome	1897	1st term
Antoine Rocheleau	Liberal	Chambly	1886, 1897	3rd term*
Pierre Grenier	Conservative	Champlain	1890	3rd term
Pierre D'Auteuil	Conservative	Charlevoix	1897	1st term
Joseph-Émery Robidoux	Liberal	Châteauguay	1884, 1897	4th term*
Honoré Petit	Conservative	Chicoutimi et Saguenay	1892	2nd term
James Hunt	Liberal	Compton	1897	1st term
Hector Champagne	Liberal	Deux-Montagnes	1897	1st term
Louis-Philippe Pelletier	Conservative	Dorchester	1888	4th term
William John Watts	Liberal	Drummond	1874, 1890, 1897	6th term*
Edmund James Flynn	Conservative (Note: First elected as Liberal)	Gaspé	1875, 1892	5th term*
Daniel-Jérémie Décarie	Liberal	Hochelaga	1897	1st term
George Washington Stephens Sr.	Liberal	Huntingdon	1881, (Note: Montréal-Centre) 1892	3rd term*
François Gosselin	Liberal	Iberville	1890	3rd term
Patrick Peter Delaney	Liberal	Îles-de-la-Madeleine	1897	1st term
Joseph-Adolphe Chauret	Liberal	Jacques Cartier	1897	1st term
Joseph-Mathias Tellier	Conservative	Joliette	1892	2nd term
Louis-Rodolphe Roy	Liberal	Kamouraska	1897	1st term
Joseph Girard	Conservative	Lac St-Jean	1892	2nd term
Côme-Séraphin Cherrier	Liberal	Laprairie	1897	1st term
Joseph Marion	Conservative	L'Assomption	1880, 1890	5th term*
Pierre-Évariste Leblanc	Conservative	Laval	1882, 1884	6th term*
François-Xavier Lemieux	Liberal	Lévis	1878, 1883, 1894	5th term*
Nazaire-Nicolas Olivier (1897)	Liberal	Lévis	1897	1st term
Charles Langelier (1898)	Liberal	Lévis	1898	1st term
François-Gilbert Miville Dechêne	Liberal	L'Islet	1886	4th term
Édouard-Hippolyte Laliberté	Liberal	Lotbinière	1886	4th term
Hector Caron	Liberal	Maskinongé	1892	2nd term
Louis-Félix Pinault	Liberal	Matane	1890, 1892	3rd term*
Donat Caron (1899)	Liberal	Matane	1899	1st term
George Robert Smith	Liberal	Mégantic	1897	1st term
James Sarsfield McCorkill	Liberal	Missisquoi	1897	1st term
Cedric Lemoine Cotton (1898)	Liberal	Missisquoi	1898	1st term
Pierre-Julien-Léonidas Bissonnette	Liberal	Montcalm	1897	1st term
Joseph-Couillard Lislois	Liberal	Montmagny	1897	1st term
Édouard Bouffard	Conservative	Montmorency	1896	2nd term
Georges-Albini Lacombe	Liberal	Montréal division no. 1	1897	1st term
Lomer Gouin	Liberal	Montréal division no. 2	1897	1st term
Henri-Benjamin Ranville	Liberal	Montréal division no. 3	1890, 1897	2nd term*
Albert William Atwater	Conservative	Montréal division no. 4	1896	2nd term
Robert Bickerdike	Liberal	Montréal division no. 5	1897	1st term
James John Edmond Guérin	Liberal	Montréal division no. 6	1895	2nd term
Dominique Monet	Liberal	Napierville	1897	1st term
Georges Ball	Conservative	Nicolet	1897	1st term
Charles Beautron Major	Liberal	Ottawa	1897	1st term
David Gillies	Liberal	Pontiac	1892	2nd term
Jules Tessier	Liberal	Portneuf	1886	4th term
Némèse Garneau	Liberal	Québec-Comté	1897	1st term
Amédée Robitaille	Liberal	Québec-Centre	1897	1st term
Joseph Shehyn	Liberal	Québec-Est	1875	7th term*
Félix Carbray	Conservative	Québec-Ouest	1881, 1892	3rd term*
Louis-Pierre-Paul Cardin	Liberal	Richelieu	1886, 1897	3rd term*
Joseph Bédard	Conservative	Richmond	1890	3rd term
Auguste Tessier	Liberal	Rimouski	1889	4th term
Alexandre-Napoléon Dufresne	Conservative	Rouville	1897	1st term
Georges-Casimir Dessaulles	Liberal	St. Hyacinthe	1897	1st term
Félix-Gabriel Marchand	Liberal	St. Jean	1867	9th term
Nérée Duplessis	Conservative	St. Maurice	1886	4th term
Simon-Napoléon Parent	Liberal	St. Sauveur	1890	3rd term
Tancrède Boucher de Grandbois	Liberal	Shefford	1888, 1897	3rd term*
Louis-Edmond Panneton	Conservative	Sherbrooke	1892	2nd term
Avila-Gonzague Bourbonnais	Liberal	Soulanges	1886	4th term
Michael Felix Hackett	Conservative	Stanstead	1892	2nd term
Félix-Alonzo Talbot	Liberal	Témiscouata	1897	1st term
Guillaume-Alphonse Nantel	Conservative	Terrebonne	1882	5th term
Télesphore-Eusèbe Normand	Conservative	Trois-Rivières	1890	3rd term
Émery Lalonde, Jr.	Liberal	Vaudreuil	1890, 1897	2nd term*
Étienne Blanchard	Liberal	Verchères	1897	1st term
Jérôme-Adolphe Chicoyne	Conservative	Wolfe	1892	2nd term
Albéric-Archie Mondou	Conservative	Yamaska	1897	1st term
Victor Gladu (1897)	Liberal	Yamaska	1897	1st term
Jules Allard (1897)	Liberal	Yamaska	1897	1st term

== Other elected MLAs ==
Other MLAs were elected during this term in by-elections.

- Victor Gladu, Quebec Liberal Party, Yamaska, November 16, 1897
- William Henry Clapperton, Quebec Liberal Party, Bonaventure, December 22, 1897
- Nazaire-Nicolas Olivier, Quebec Liberal Party, Lévis, December 22, 1897
- Cedric Lemoine Cotton, Quebec Liberal Party, Missisquoi, December 19, 1898
- Donat Caron, Quebec Liberal Party, Matane, January 11, 1899

== Cabinet Ministers ==
- Prime Minister and Executive Council President: Félix-Gabriel Marchand
- Agriculture: François-Gilbert Miville Dechêne
- Colonization and Mines: Adélard Turgeon
- Public Works: Henri Thomas Duffy
- Crown Lands: Guillaume-Alphonse Nantel (1896-1897)
- Lands, Forests and Fishing: Simon-Napoléon Parent
- Attorney General:Horace Archambault
- Provincial secretary: Felix-Gabriel Marchand (1897), Joseph-Émery Robidoux (1897-1900)
- Treasurer: Félix-Gabriel Marchand
- Members without portfolios, George Washington Stephens, Joseph Shehyn, James John Guerin
