= Lévis (provincial electoral district) =

Provincial electoral district in Quebec, Canada

Coordinates: 46°47′N 71°11′W

Quebec electoral district
- Location in Quebec

Provincial electoral district
- Legislature: National Assembly of Quebec
MNA
Karine Laflamme
Conservative
- District created: 1867
- First contested: 1867
- Last contested: 2026

Demographics
- Population (2011): 58,320
- Electors (2014): 46,785
- Area (km²): 76.2
- Pop. density (per km²): 765.4
- Census division: Lévis (part)
- Census subdivision: Lévis (part)

Lévis (French pronunciation: [levi]) is a provincial electoral district in the Chaudière-Appalaches region of Quebec, Canada. It includes the city of Lévis north of Autoroute 20 and east of the Chaudière River. This includes downtown Lévis, Lauzon, Saint-David-de-l'Auberivière and Saint-Romuald.

It was created for the 1867 election (and an electoral district of that name existed earlier in the Legislative Assembly of the Province of Canada).

== Members of the Legislative Assembly / National Assembly ==
Legislature	Years	Member	Party
1st	1867–1871	Joseph-Goderic Blanchet	Conservative
2nd	1871–1875	Joseph-Goderic Blanchet	Conservative
3rd	1875–1878	Étienne-Théodore Pâquet	Liberal
4th	1878–1879	Étienne-Théodore Pâquet	Liberal
4th	1879–1881	Étienne-Théodore Pâquet	Conservative
5th	1881–1883	Étienne-Théodore Pâquet	Conservative
5th	1883–1886	François-Xavier Lemieux	Liberal
6th	1886–1890	François-Xavier Lemieux	Liberal
7th	1890–1892	François-Xavier Lemieux	Liberal
8th	1892–1897	Angus Baker	Conservative
9th	1897–1897	François-Xavier Lemieux	Liberal
9th	1897–1898†	Nazaire-Nicolas Olivier	Liberal
9th	1898–1900	Charles Langelier	Liberal
10th	1900–1901	Charles Langelier	Liberal
10th	1901–1904	Jean-Cleophas Blouin	Liberal
11th	1904–1908	Jean-Cleophas Blouin	Liberal
12th	1908–1911	Jean-Cleophas Blouin	Liberal
12th	1911–1912	Laetare Roy	Liberal
13th	1912–1916	Alphonse Bernier	Conservative
14th	1916–1919	Alfred-Valère Roy	Liberal
15th	1919–1923	Alfred-Valère Roy	Liberal
16th	1923–1927	Alfred-Valère Roy	Liberal
17th	1927–1931	Alfred-Valère Roy	Liberal
18th	1931–1935	Arthur Belanger	Liberal
19th	1935–1936	Joseph-Théophile Larochelle	Action liberale nationale
20th	1936–1939	Joseph-Théophile Larochelle	Union Nationale
21st	1939–1944	Joseph-Georges Francoeur	Liberal
22nd	1944–1948	Joseph-Théophile Larochelle	Union Nationale
23rd	1948–1948	Joseph-Théophile Larochelle	Union Nationale
23rd	1949–1952	Joseph-Albert Samson	Union Nationale
24th	1952–1956	Raymond Bélanger	Liberal
25th	1956–1960	Joseph-Albert Samson	Union Nationale
26th	1960–1962	Roger Roy	Liberal
27th	1962–1966	Roger Roy	Liberal
28th	1966–1970	Jean-Marie Morin	Union Nationale
29th	1970–1973	Joseph-Aurélien Roy	Ralliement créditiste
30th	1973–1976	Vincent-François Chagnon	Liberal
31st	1976–1981	Jean Garon	Parti Québécois
32nd	1981–1985	Jean Garon	Parti Québécois
33rd	1985–1989	Jean Garon	Parti Québécois
34th	1989–1994	Jean Garon	Parti Québécois
35th	1994–1998	Jean Garon	Parti Québécois
36th	1998–2003	Linda Goupil	Parti Québécois
37th	2003–2007	Carole Théberge	Liberal
38th	2007–2008	Christian Lévesque	Action démocratique
39th	2008–2012	Gilles Lehouillier	Liberal
40th	2012–2014	Christian Dubé	Coalition Avenir Québec
41st	2014–2014	Christian Dubé	Coalition Avenir Québec
41st	2014–2018	François Paradis	Coalition Avenir Québec
42nd	2018–2022	François Paradis	Coalition Avenir Québec
43rd	2022–2026	Bernard Drainville	Coalition Avenir Québec
44th	2026–Present	Karine Laflamme	Conservative

== Election results ==
2026 Quebec general election
** Preliminary results — Not yet official **
Party	Candidate	Votes	%	±%
Conservative	Karine Laflamme	15,375	38.53	+17.78
Parti Québécois	Yanick Godbout	8,875	22.24	+9.33
Coalition Avenir Québec	Bernard Drainville	6,835	17.13	–31.66
Liberal	Brittany Blais	5,381	13.48	+8.35
Québec solidaire	Simon Beauchamp-Léveillé	3,146	7.88	–3.59
Climat Québec	Pierre Germain	163	0.41	+0.04
Présence	Yvan Tremblay	130	0.33	N/A
Total valid votes		39,905	98.68	+0.04
Total rejected ballots		534	1.32	–0.04
Turnout		40,439	74.86	+1.13
Electors on the lists		54,022		
Conservative gain from Coalition Avenir Québec		Swing		+4.23
Source: Élections Québec

2022 Quebec general election
Party	Candidate	Votes	%	±%
Coalition Avenir Québec	Bernard Drainville	18,051	48.79	–8.50
Conservative	Karine Laflamme	7,677	20.75	+18.00
Parti Québécois	Pierre-Gilles Morel	4,775	12.91	+2.66
Québec solidaire	Valérie Cayouette-Guilloteau	4,244	11.47	–0.27
Liberal	Richard Garon	1,899	5.13	–9.33
Green	Mehdi Lahlou	213	0.58	–1.48
Climat Québec	André Voyer	138	0.37	–
Total valid votes		36,997	98.64	+0.17
Total rejected ballots		511	1.36	–0.17
Turnout		37,508	73.73	+2.33
Electors on the lists		50,875	–	–

2018 Quebec general election
Party	Candidate	Votes	%	±%
Coalition Avenir Québec	François Paradis	19,417	57.29	+10.5
Liberal	Abdulkadir Abkey	4,901	14.46	-18
Québec solidaire	Georges Goma	3,979	11.74	+4.08
Parti Québécois	Pierre-Gilles Morel	3,475	10.25	+1.97
Conservative	Michel Walters	931	2.75	+0.42
Green	Maude Bussière	698	2.06	+0.96
New Democratic	Lorraine Chartier	200	0.59	
Citoyens au pouvoir	Nancy Fournier	174	0.51	
Bloc Pot	Stéphane L'heureux-Blouin	116	0.34	
Total valid votes		33,891	98.47	
Total rejected ballots		525	1.53	
Turnout		34,416	71.40	
Eligible voters		48,200		
Coalition Avenir Québec hold		Swing		+14.25
Source(s) "Rapport des résultats officiels du scrutin". Élections Québec.

Quebec provincial by-election, October 20, 2014
Party	Candidate	Votes	%	±%
Coalition Avenir Québec	François Paradis	10,110	46.79	+6.30
Liberal	Janet Jones	7,014	32.46	-2.46
Parti Québécois	Alexandre Bégin	1,788	8.28	-8.34
Québec solidaire	Yv Bonnier Viger	1,654	7.66	+1.50
Conservative	Adrien Pouliot	503	2.33	+1.54
Green	Alex Tyrrell	238	1.10	–
Option nationale	François Thériault	168	0.78	+0.06
Independent	Maxime Lapointe	60	0.28	–
Unité Nationale	Daniel Lachance	30	0.14	-0.17
Parti indépendantiste	Grégoire Bonneau-Fortier	27	0.12	–
Équipe Autonomiste	Guy Boivin	13	0.06	–
Total valid votes		21,605	99.24	–
Total rejected ballots		165	0.76	–
Turnout		21,770	46.31	-29.12
Electors on the lists		47,006	–	–
Coalition Avenir Québec hold		Swing		+4.38

2014 Quebec general election
Party	Candidate	Votes	%	±%
Coalition Avenir Québec	Christian Dubé	14,131	40.49	+0.62
Liberal	Simon Turmel	12,188	34.93	+4.04
Parti Québécois	Sylvie Girard	5,797	16.61	-3.43
Québec solidaire	Yv Bonnier Viger	2,147	6.15	+0.93
Conservative	Sébastien Roy	274	0.79	+0.07
Option nationale	Nicolas Belley	252	0.72	-1.11
Unité Nationale	Paul Biron	107	0.31	+0.10
Total valid votes		34,896	98.88	+0.03
Total rejected ballots		396	1.12	-0.03
Turnout		35,292	75.43	-3.92
Electors on the list		46,785	–	–
Coalition Avenir Québec hold		Swing		-1.71

2012 Quebec general election
Party	Candidate	Votes	%	±%
Coalition Avenir Québec	Christian Dubé	14,528	39.87	+7.40
Liberal	Gilles Lehouillier	11,255	30.87	-8.76
Parti Québécois	Stéphane Labrie	7,302	20.04	-3.32
Québec solidaire	Valérie C. Guilloteau	1,904	5.23	+0.71
Option nationale	Nathaly Dufour	669	1.84	–
Conservative	Luc Harvey	259	0.71	–
Middle Class	Patrick Vallières	242	0.66	–
Parti équitable	Yvan Rodrigue	126	0.35	–
Équipe Autonomiste	Carl Michaud	76	0.21	–
Unité Nationale	Paul Biron	75	0.21	–
Total valid votes		36,436	98.84	–
Total rejected ballots		426	1.16	–
Turnout		36,862	79.35	+15.22
Electors on the list		46,455	–	–
Coalition Avenir Québec notional gain from Liberal		Swing		+8.08

^ Change is from redistributed results. CAQ change is from ADQ.

2008 Quebec general election
Party	Candidate	Votes	%	±%
Liberal	Gilles Lehouillier	12,646	38.65	+13.45
Action démocratique	Christian Lévesque	11,199	34.23	-9.91
Parti Québécois	Jimmy Grenier	7,438	22.73	-2.91
Québec solidaire	Valérie C. Guilloteau	1,438	4.39	+2.36
Total valid votes		32,721	98.53	-0.79
Total rejected ballots		489	1.47	+0.79
Turnout		33,210	64.13	-15.21
Electors on the list		51,789	–	–
Liberal gain from Action démocratique		Swing		+11.68

2007 Quebec general election
Party	Candidate	Votes	%	±%
Action démocratique	Christian Lévesque	17,388	44.14	+15.07
Parti Québécois	Linda Goupil	10,101	25.64	-8.37
Liberal	Carole Théberge	9,925	25.19	-9.92
Green	Jean-Claude Lespérance	1,015	2.58	–
Québec solidaire	Valérie C. Guilloteau	802	2.04	+0.83
Christian Democracy	Paul Biron	127	0.32	–
People's Front	Serge Patenaude	36	0.09	–
Total valid votes		39,394	99.32	+0.31
Total rejected ballots		270	0.68	-0.31
Turnout		39,664	79.33	+1.78
Electors on the list		49,997	–	–
Action démocratique gain from Liberal		Swing		+12.50

^ Quebec solidaire change is from UFP

2003 Quebec general election
Party	Candidate	Votes	%	±%
Liberal	Carole Théberge	12,891	35.12	-0.05
Parti Québécois	Linda Goupil	12,485	34.01	-15.09
Action démocratique	Joël Bernier	10,670	29.07	+14.62
UFP	Madeleine Provencher	442	1.20	–
Independent	Richard Larrivée	220	0.60	–
Total valid votes		36,708	99.00	–
Total rejected ballots		369	1.00	–
Turnout		37,077	77.56	-2.36
Electors on the list		47,806	–	–

1998 Quebec general election
Party	Candidate	Votes	%
Parti Québécois	Linda Goupil	15,473	49.10
Liberal	Daniel Deslauriers	11,083	35.17
Action démocratique	Nelson Michaud	4,553	14.45
Socialist Democracy	Paul Biron	196	0.62
Independent	Daniel Frachon	149	0.47
Marxist–Leninist	Geneviève Royer	60	0.19
Total valid votes		31,514	99.07
Total rejected ballots		295	0.93
Turnout		31,809	79.92
Electors on the lists		39,803	–

1995 Quebec referendum
Side	Votes	%
Oui	19,917	56.54
Non	15,311	43.46

1994 Quebec general election
Party	Candidate	Votes	%
Parti Québécois	Jean Garon	20,998	72.26
Liberal	Jean-Pierre Corriveau	8,061	27.74
Total valid votes		29,059	96.00
Total rejected ballots		1,211	4.00
Turnout		30,270	82.11
Electors on the lists		36,866	–

1992 Charlottetown Accord referendum
Side	Votes	%
Non	20,387	67.45
Oui	9,837	32.55

1989 Quebec general election
Party	Candidate	Votes	%
Parti Québécois	Jean Garon	17,968	66.67
Liberal	Henri Beaudry	8,467	31.42
Socialist Movement	Germain Gauvin	517	1.92
Total valid votes		26,952	98.00
Total rejected ballots		549	2.00
Turnout		27,501	78.96
Electors on the lists		34,831	–

1985 Quebec general election
Party	Candidate	Votes	%
Parti Québécois	Jean Garon	20,520	49.09
Liberal	Gilles Roberge	19,046	45.56
New Democratic	Michel Carbonneau	1,154	2.76
Progressive Conservative	Réal Arsenault	437	1.05
Parti indépendantiste	Nelson Bouffard	323	0.77
Socialist Movement	Germain Gauvin	240	0.58
Christian Socialism	Francine Labrie	80	0.19
Total valid votes		41,800	98.72
Total rejected ballots		540	1.28
Turnout		42,340	79.95
Electors on the lists		52,961	–

1981 Quebec general election
Party	Candidate	Votes	%
Parti Québécois	Jean Garon	13,131	59.42
Liberal	Claude Garcia	15,640	38.02
Union Nationale	Simon Dubois	972	2.36
Marxist–Leninist	Jacques Goulet	82	0.20
Total valid votes		41,138	99.20
Total rejected ballots		333	0.80
Turnout		41,471	85.74
Electors on the lists		48,371	–

1980 Quebec referendum
Side	Votes	%
Non	20,450	50.43
Oui	20,104	49.57

1976 Quebec general election
Party	Candidate	Votes	%
Parti Québécois	Jean Garon	17,227	48.49
Liberal	Vincent Chagnon	11,340	31.92
Union Nationale	Cyrille Dubé	5,585	15.72
Ralliement créditiste	Gilles Campagna	1,375	3.87
Total valid votes		35,527	97.12
Total rejected ballots		1,052	2.88
Turnout		36,579	88.81
Electors on the lists		41,188	–

1973 Quebec general election
Party	Candidate	Votes	%
Liberal	Vincent Chagnon	16,534	54.73
Parti Québécois	Bruno Leclerc	9,084	30.07
Ralliement créditiste	Joseph-Aurélien Roy	3,177	10.51
Union Nationale	Robert Giroux	1,416	4.69
Total valid votes		30,211	96.10
Total rejected ballots		1,227	3.90
Turnout		31,438	85.61
Electors on the lists		36,723	–

1970 Quebec general election
Party	Candidate	Votes	%
Ralliement créditiste	Joseph-Aurélien Roy	10,268	31.14
Liberal	Joseph-Édouard Ruel	10,059	30.50
Union Nationale	Jean-Marie Morin	8,179	24.80
Parti Québécois	Paul Biron	4,470	13.56
Total valid votes		32,976	97.64
Total rejected ballots		796	2.36
Turnout		33,772	87.54
Electors on the lists		38,577	–

1966 Quebec general election
Party	Candidate	Votes	%
Union Nationale	Jean-Marie Morin	15,141	53.10
Liberal	Roger Roy	12,020	42.15
RIN	Édouard Gagné	843	2.96
Ralliement national	Joseph-Henri Bégin	511	1.79
Total valid votes		28,515	98.30
Total rejected ballots		492	1.70
Turnout		29,007	83.04
Electors on the lists		34,931	–

1962 Quebec general election
Party	Candidate	Votes	%
Liberal	Roger Roy	13,434	54.43
Union Nationale	Jean-Marie Morin	11,088	44.93
Independent	Édouard Gagné	158	0.64
Total valid votes		24,680	98.62
Total rejected ballots		346	1.38
Turnout		25,026	88.47
Electors on the lists		28,288	–

1960 Quebec general election
Party	Candidate	Votes	%
Liberal	Roger Roy	13,194	54.74
Union Nationale	Joseph-Albert Samson	10,908	45.26
Total valid votes		24,102	98.62
Total rejected ballots		299	1.23
Turnout		24,401	90.25
Electors on the lists		27,038	–

1956 Quebec general election
Party	Candidate	Votes	%
Union Nationale	Joseph-Albert Samson	12,220	54.30
Liberal	Raynold Bélanger	10,106	44.91
Independent UN	Paul Cloutier	100	0.44
Independent UN	Aline Welsh-Murphy	61	0.27
Labor-Progressive	Oscar Valcourt	18	0.08
Total valid votes		22,505	98.94
Total rejected ballots		242	1.06
Turnout		22,747	90.04
Electors on the lists		25,262	–

1952 Quebec general election
Party	Candidate	Votes	%
Liberal	Raynold Bélanger	9,725	50.26
Union Nationale	Joseph-Albert Samson	3,408	49.74
Total valid votes		19,351	92.20
Total rejected ballots		1,637	7.80
Turnout		20,988	85.35
Electors on the lists		24,590	–

Quebec provincial by-election, 1949
Party	Candidate	Votes	%
Union Nationale	Joseph-Théophile Larochelle	12,328	80.74
Union des électeurs	Joseph Émile Abel Paradis	2,941	19.26
Total valid votes		15,269	98.02
Total rejected ballots		308	1.98
Turnout		15,577	64.89
Electors on the lists		24,004	–

1948 Quebec general election
Party	Candidate	Votes	%
Union Nationale	Joseph-Théophile Larochelle	10,322	52.41
Liberal	Joseph-Albéric Guay	5,810	29.50
Union des électeurs	Henri Jobin	3,561	18.08
Total valid votes		19,693	98.19
Total rejected ballots		362	1.81
Turnout		20,055	85.06
Electors on the lists		23,577	–

1944 Quebec general election
Party	Candidate	Votes	%
Union Nationale	Joseph-Théophile Larochelle	8,101	45.94
Liberal	Joseph-Georges Francoeur	7,180	40.72
Bloc populaire	Pierre Letarte	2,352	13.34
Total valid votes		17,633	98.76
Total rejected ballots		222	1.24
Turnout		17,855	79.79
Electors on the lists		22,378	–

1939 Quebec general election
Party	Candidate	Votes	%
Liberal	Joseph-Georges Francoeur	4,342	56.03
Union Nationale	Joseph-Théophile Larochelle	3,408	43.97
Total valid votes		7,750	99.00
Total rejected ballots		78	1.00
Turnout		7,828	85.60
Electors on the lists		9,145	–

1936 Quebec general election
Party	Candidate	Votes	%
Union Nationale	Joseph-Théophile Larochelle	4,053	51.24
Liberal	Jean-Marie Fortin	3,857	48.76
Total valid votes		7,910	99.63
Total rejected ballots		29	0.37
Turnout		7,939	85.38
Electors on the lists		9,298	–

1935 Quebec general election
Party	Candidate	Votes	%
Action libérale nationale	Joseph-Théophile Larochelle	3,346	42.3
Independent Liberal	Joseph-Amédée Gagnon	2,751	34.80
Liberal	Arthur Bélanger	1,808	22.87
Total valid votes		7,905	99.53
Total rejected ballots		37	0.47
Turnout		7,942	86.19
Electors on the lists		9,215	–

1931 Quebec general election
Party	Candidate	Votes	%
Liberal	Arthur Bélanger	3,595	53.04
Conservative	Noël Belleau	3,183	46.96
Total valid votes		6,778	99.54
Total rejected ballots		31	0.46
Turnout		6,809	86.43
Electors on the lists		7,878	–

1927 Quebec general election
Party	Candidate	Votes	%
Liberal	Alfred-Valère Roy	3,432	73.92
Conservative	Émile Asselin	1,211	26.08
Total valid votes		4,643	99.29
Total rejected ballots		33	0.71
Turnout		4,676	59.79
Electors on the lists		7,821	–

1923 Quebec general election
Party	Candidate	Votes	%
Liberal	Alfred-Valère Roy	3,390	61.96
Conservative	Pierre Audet	2,081	38.04
Total valid votes		5,471	99.00
Total rejected ballots		55	1.00
Turnout		5,526	76.43
Electors on the lists		7,230	–

1919 Quebec general election
Party	Candidate	Votes	%
Liberal	Alfred-Valère Roy	Acclaimed	
Electors on the lists		6,939	–

1916 Quebec general election
Party	Candidate	Votes	%
Liberal	Alfred-Valère Roy	3,459	62.21
Conservative	Alphonse Bernier	2,101	37.79
Total valid votes		5,560	98.25
Total rejected ballots		99	1.75
Turnout		5,659	81.57
Electors on the lists		6,938	–

1912 Quebec general election
Party	Candidate	Votes	%
Conservative	Alphonse Bernier	2,603	53.54
Liberal	Laetare Roy	3,459	45.80
Independent Liberal	Evans Guay	32	0.66
Total valid votes		4,862	99.06
Total rejected ballots		46	0.94
Turnout		4,908	72.31
Electors on the lists		6,787	–

Quebec provincial by-election, 1911
Party	Candidate	Votes	%
Liberal	Laetare Roy	2,711	55.97
Conservative	Alphonse Bernier	2,133	44.03
Total valid votes		4,844	98.80
Total rejected ballots		59	1.20
Turnout		4,903	72.31
Electors on the lists		6,236	–

1908 Quebec general election
Party	Candidate	Votes	%
Liberal	Jean-Cléophas Blouin	2,688	59.21
Conservative	Alphonse Bernier	1,852	40.79
Total valid votes		4,540	99.10
Total rejected ballots		41	0.90
Turnout		4,581	73.24
Electors on the lists		6,255	–

1904 Quebec general election
Party	Candidate	Votes
Liberal	Jean-Cléophas Blouin	Acclaimed
Electors on the lists		5,900

Quebec provincial by-election, 1901
Party	Candidate	Votes
Liberal	Jean-Cléophas Blouin	Acclaimed

1900 Quebec general election
Party	Candidate	Votes
Liberal	Charles Langelier	Acclaimed
Electors on the lists		5,521

Quebec provincial by-election, 1898
Party	Candidate	Votes	%
Liberal	Charles Langelier	2,711	55.97
Conservative	Joseph-Émile Gelly	1,582	42.01
Liberal	Joseph Boutin-Bourassa	504	13.38
Total valid votes		3,766	100.00
Turnout		3,766	68.08
Electors on the lists		5,532	–

Quebec provincial by-election, 1897
Party	Candidate	Votes	%
Liberal	Nazaire-Nicolas Olivier	2,075	56.37
Liberal	C.G. Beaulieu	1,606	46.63
Total valid votes		3,681	100.00
Turnout		3,681	66.54
Electors on the lists		5,532	–

1897 Quebec general election
Party	Candidate	Votes	%
Liberal	François-Xavier Lemieux	2,546	63.36
Conservative	Angus Baker	1,472	36.64
Total valid votes		4,018	99.01
Total rejected ballots		40	0.99
Turnout		4,058	73.36
Electors on the lists		5,532	–

1892 Quebec general election
Party	Candidate	Votes	%
Conservative	Angus Baker	2,166	53.34
Liberal	Nazaire-Nicolas Olivier	1,871	46.07
Independent	Alfred Martineau	24	0.59
Total valid votes		4,061	99.51
Total rejected ballots		20	0.49
Turnout		4,081	75.13
Electors on the lists		5,432	–

1890 Quebec general election
Party	Candidate	Votes	%
Liberal	François-Xavier Lemieux	1,964	53.08
Conservative	Angus Baker	1,736	46.92
Total valid votes		3,700	97.04
Total rejected ballots		113	2.96
Turnout		3,813	76.92
Electors on the lists		4,957	–

1886 Quebec general election
Party	Candidate	Votes	%
Liberal	François-Xavier Lemieux	1,878	51.66
Conservative	J.-E. Roy	1,757	48.34
Total valid votes		3,635	98.51
Total rejected ballots		55	1.49
Turnout		3,690	74.32
Electors on the lists		4,965	–

Quebec provincial by-election, 1883
Party	Candidate	Votes	%
Liberal	François-Xavier Lemieux	1,750	50.52
Conservative	J.-E. Roy	1,714	49.48
Total valid votes		3,464	100.00
Turnout		3,464	70.71
Electors on the lists		4,899	–

1881 Quebec general election
Party	Candidate	Votes	%
Conservative	Étienne-Théodore Pâquet	1,547	50.97
Conservative	Isidore-Noël Belleau	1,488	49.03
Total valid votes		3,035	98.22
Total rejected ballots		55	1.78
Turnout		3,090	63.98
Electors on the lists		4,830	–

Quebec provincial by-election, 1879
Party	Candidate	Votes	%
Conservative	Étienne-Théodore Pâquet	2,160	57.28
Conservative	Timolaüs Beaulieu	1,551	42.72
Total valid votes		3,711	100.00
Turnout		3,711	75.17
Electors on the lists		4,937	–

1878 Quebec general election
Party	Candidate	Votes	%
Liberal	Étienne-Théodore Pâquet	2,214	52.16
Conservative	François-Xavier Couillard	2,031	47.84
Total valid votes		4,245	99.00
Total rejected ballots		43	1.00
Turnout		4,288	85.03
Electors on the lists		5,043	–

1875 Quebec general election
Party	Candidate	Votes	%
Liberal	Étienne-Théodore Pâquet	1,994	52.05
Conservative	Joseph-Goderic Blanchet	1,837	47.95
Total valid votes		3,831	99.84
Total rejected ballots		6	0.16
Turnout		3,837	80.73
Electors on the lists		4,753	–

1871 Quebec general election
Party	Candidate	Votes	%
Conservative	Joseph-Goderic Blanchet	1,627	55.74
Liberal	Louis-Honoré Fréchette	1,292	44.26
Total valid votes		2,919	100.00
Turnout		2,919	73.45
Electors on the lists		3,974	–

1867 Quebec general election
Party	Candidate	Votes	%
Conservative	Joseph-Goderic Blanchet	1,429	65.13
Liberal	Hospice Marceau	765	34.87
Total valid votes		2,194	100.00
Turnout		2,194	59.83
Electors on the lists		3,667	–

== See also ==
- List of Quebec provincial electoral districts
- Canadian provincial electoral districts
