= Pierre Bertrand (politician) =

Canadian politician

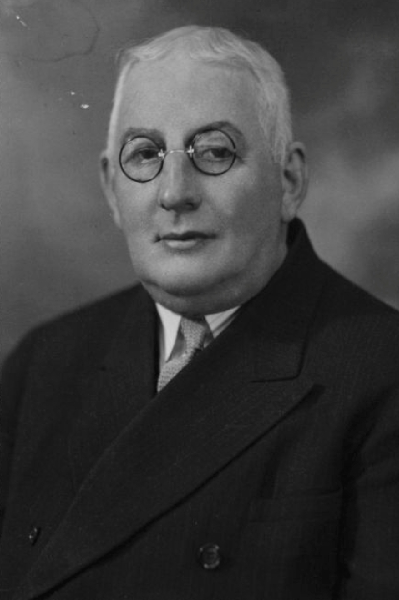

Member of the Legislative Assembly of Quebec for Saint-Sauveur
- In office 1923–1927
- Preceded by: Arthur Paquet
- Succeeded by: Charles-Édouard Cantin
- In office 1935–1939
- Preceded by: Charles-Édouard Cantin
- Succeeded by: Wilfrid Hamel

Member of the Legislative Council of Quebec for La Salle
- In office 1939–1948
- Preceded by: Jean Mercier
- Succeeded by: Joseph-Théophile Larochelle

Personal details
- Born: December 24, 1875 Quebec City, Quebec
- Died: December 22, 1948 (aged 72) Quebec City, Quebec
- Party: Conservative

Pierre Bertrand (French pronunciation: [pjɛʁ bɛʁtʁɑ̃]; December 24, 1875 – December 22, 1948) was a politician in Quebec, Canada, and a Member of the Legislative Assembly of Quebec (MLA).

== Early life ==
He was born on December 24, 1875, in Quebec City's St. Roch neighbourhood.

== City Councillor ==
Bertrand served as a city councillor for Quebec City Council from 1914 to 1927, 1930 to 1932 and 1936 to 1948.

== Federal Politics ==
Bertrand ran as a Conservative candidate in the district of Quebec West in the 1921 federal election and finished second against Liberal incumbent Georges Parent.

== Member of the legislature ==
He ran as a Labour candidate in the district of Saint-Sauveur in the 1923 provincial election and won. He lost the 1927 provincial election. Bertrand was re-elected as a Conservative candidate in the 1931 and the 1935 elections. He joined Maurice Duplessis's Union Nationale and was re-elected in the 1936 election.

== Legislative Councillor ==
Bertrand was appointed to the Legislative Council of Quebec not long before the 1939 election.

== Death ==
He died on December 22, 1948.
