= 1904 Quebec general election =

Canadian provincial election

← 1900	November 25, 1904	1908 →

74 seats in the 11th Legislative Assembly of Quebec 38 seats were needed for a majority
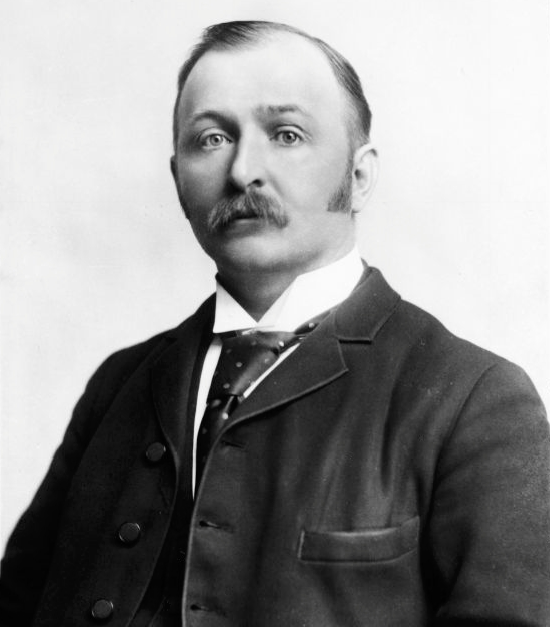

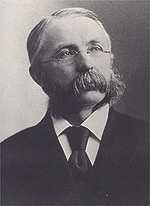
	First party	Second party
Leader	Simon-Napoléon Parent	Edmund James Flynn
Party	Liberal	Conservative
Leader since	1900	1896
Leader's seat	Saint-Sauveur	Gaspé
Last election	67 seats, 53.15%	7 seats, 41.85%
Seats won	67	7
Seat change	Steady	Steady
Popular vote	62,889	30,331
Percentage	55.43%	26.73%
Swing	▲2.28pp	▼15.12pp
Premier before election
Simon-Napoléon Parent
Liberal
Premier after election
Simon-Napoléon Parent
Liberal

The 1904 Quebec general election was held on November 25, 1904, to elect members of the Legislative Assembly of the Province of Quebec, Canada. The incumbent Quebec Liberal Party, led by Simon-Napoléon Parent, was re-elected, defeating the Quebec Conservative Party, led by Edmund James Flynn.

It was Parent's final election. Due to internal dissension within his party, he resigned in 1905, and was succeeded as Liberal leader and premier by Lomer Gouin.

The turnout was 29.97%.

== Results ==
Party	Party leader	# of candidates	Seats			Popular Vote		
Party	Party leader	# of candidates	1900	Elected	% Change	#	%	% Change
Liberal	Simon-Napoléon Parent	87	67	67	-	62,889	55.43%	+2.28%
Conservative	Edmund James Flynn	24	7	7	-	30,331	26.73%	-15.12%
Other		6	-	-	-	20,233	17.84%	+12.8%
Total		117	74	74	-%	113,453	100%	

Popular vote
PLQ	55.43%
PCQ	26.73%
Others	17.84%

Seats summary
PLQ	90.54%
PCQ	9.46%

== See also ==
- List of Quebec premiers
- Politics of Quebec
- Timeline of Quebec history
- List of Quebec political parties
- 11th Legislative Assembly of Quebec
