= Christian Lévesque =

Canadian politician (born 1970)

MNA for Lévis
- In office April 25, 2007 – November 5, 2008
- Preceded by: Carole Théberge
- Succeeded by: Gilles Lehouillier

Personal details
- Born: May 29, 1970 (age 55)
- Party: Coalition Avenir Québec; Action démocratique du Québec

Christian Lévesque (born May 29, 1970) is a former politician from Quebec, Canada. He was an Action démocratique du Québec Member of the National Assembly for the electoral district of Lévis from 2007 to 2008.

Before his election, he served as President of the Lévis Chamber of Commerce. He was also the owner and manager of a local store in Levis and was president of General Textiles International in Paris, France. He was a member of the Knights of Columbus in Ancienne-Lorette

Lévesque was first elected in the 2007 election with 44% of the vote. Parti Québécois (PQ) former cabinet member Linda Goupil finished second with 26% of the vote; Liberal incumbent and cabinet member Carole Théberge finished a close third with 25% of the vote.

Lévesque took office on April 12, 2007. On April 19, 2007, he was selected to be the Official Opposition's Shadow Minister for the Treasury Board.

In 2009, Lévesque announced his candidacy for the leadership of the ADQ.

In the 2012 election, he ran unsuccessfully for the CAQ in Bellechasse.

== Footnotes ==
Political offices
Preceded by Sylvain Simard (PQ)	Official Opposition's Shadow Minister for the Treasury Board; 2007–2008	Succeeded by Sylvain Simard (PQ)
Business positions
Preceded by Stéphane Labrie	President of the Lévis Chamber of Commerce; 2006–2007	Succeeded by Michel Paré
