= Christian Dubé =

Christian Dubé may refer to:

- Christian Dubé (ice hockey)
- Christian Dubé (politician)
