= Linda Goupil =

Canadian politician (born 1961)

MNA for Lévis
- In office 1998–2003
- Preceded by: Jean Garon
- Succeeded by: Carole Théberge

Personal details
- Born: May 13, 1961 (age 65) Saint-Léon-de-Standon, Quebec
- Party: Parti Québécois
- Profession: lawyer

Linda Goupil (born May 13, 1961 in Saint-Léon-de-Standon, Quebec) is a former Canadian politician, who represented the electoral district of Lévis in the National Assembly of Quebec from 1998 to 2003. First elected in the 1998 provincial election, she sat as a member of the Parti Québécois caucus, and served in the Executive Council of Quebec as Minister of Justice from 1998 to 2001.

She was defeated by Carole Théberge of the Quebec Liberal Party in the 2003 election. She ran again in the 2007 election, in which she and Théberge were both defeated by Christian Lévesque of the Action démocratique du Québec.

Goupil ran in the 2014 provincial election in the neighbouring district of Bellechasse, but was not reelected to the legislature.

== Electoral record ==
1998 Quebec general election
Party	Candidate	Votes	%
Parti Québécois	Linda Goupil	15,473	49.10
Liberal	Daniel Deslauriers	11,083	35.17
Action démocratique	Nelson Michaud	4,553	14.45
Socialist Democracy	Paul Biron	196	0.62
Independent	Daniel Frachon	149	0.47
Marxist–Leninist	Geneviève Royer	60	0.19
Total valid votes		31,514	99.07
Total rejected ballots		295	0.93
Turnout		31,809	79.92
Electors on the lists		39,803	–

2003 Quebec general election
Party	Candidate	Votes	%	±%
Liberal	Carole Théberge	12,891	35.12	-0.05
Parti Québécois	Linda Goupil	12,485	34.01	-15.09
Action démocratique	Joël Bernier	10,670	29.07	+14.62
UFP	Madeleine Provencher	442	1.20	–
Independent	Richard Larrivée	220	0.60	–
Total valid votes		36,708	99.00	–
Total rejected ballots		369	1.00	–
Turnout		37,077	77.56	-2.36
Electors on the list		47,806	–	–

2007 Quebec general election
Party	Candidate	Votes	%	±%
Action démocratique	Christian Lévesque	17,388	44.14	+15.07
Parti Québécois	Linda Goupil	10,101	25.64	-8.37
Liberal	Carole Théberge	9,925	25.19	-9.92
Green	Jean-Claude Lespérance	1,015	2.58	–
Québec solidaire	Valérie C. Guilloteau	802	2.04	+0.83
Christian Democracy	Paul Biron	127	0.32	–
People's Front	Serge Patenaude	36	0.09	–
Total valid votes		39,394	99.32	+0.31
Total rejected ballots		270	0.68	-0.31
Turnout		39,664	79.33	+1.78
Electors on the list		49,997	–	–
Action démocratique gain from Liberal		Swing		+12.50

2014 Quebec general election
Party	Candidate	Votes	%	±%
Liberal	Dominique Vien	15,843	49.27	+8.60
Coalition Avenir Québec	Stéphanie Lachance	10,668	33.18	-5.33
Parti Québécois	Linda Goupil	4,283	13.32	-1.86
Québec solidaire	Benoit Comeau	378	2.69	-0.38
Conservative	Patrice Aubin	344	1.18	+0.51
Option nationale	Mathilde Lefebvre	116	0.36	–
Total valid votes		32,153	99.03	–
Total rejected ballots		316	0.97	–
Turnout		32,469	75.23	-0.89
Electors on the lists		43,158	–	–
