= Clapperton =

Clapperton is a surname, and may refer to:

- Hugh Clapperton (1788–1827), Scottish traveller and explorer of West and Central Africa
- James Clapperton (b. 1968), a Scottish composer and pianist
- Thomas J Clapperton (1879–1962), Scottish sculptor
- William Henry Clapperton (1839–1922), a Canadian politician
