= Joseph-Georges Francoeur =

Canadian politician

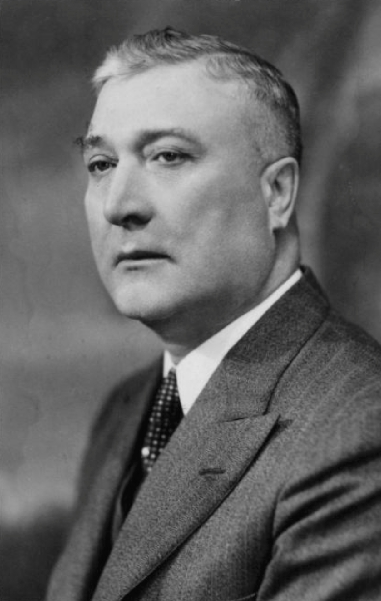

Member of the Legislative Assembly of Quebec for Lévis
- In office 1939–1944
- Preceded by: Joseph-Théophile Larochelle
- Succeeded by: Joseph-Théophile Larochelle

Personal details
- Born: October 7, 1889 Lévis, Quebec
- Died: July 19, 1956 (aged 66) Rimouski, Quebec
- Party: Liberal

Joseph-Georges Francoeur (October 7, 1889 – July 19, 1956) was a Canadian provincial politician.

Born in Lévis, Quebec, Francoeur was the member of the Legislative Assembly of Quebec for Lévis from 1939 to 1944.
