= Karine Laflamme =

Canadian politician

Karine Laflamme MNA

Member of the National Assembly for Lévis
- Incumbent
- Assumed office October 5, 2026
- Preceded by: Bernard Drainville

Personal details
- Party: Conservative
- Other political affiliations: Prospérité Lévis (2025); Lévis Force 10 (2017-2021)

Karine Laflamme is a Canadian politician who was elected as the Member of the National Assembly (MNA) for Lévis in the 2026 Quebec general election, representing the Conservative Party of Quebec.

Laflamme is a former councillor of the Lévis City Council, having first been elected in 2017 before ending her term in 2021.

== Electoral record ==
2022 Quebec general election: Lévis
Party	Candidate	Votes	%	±%
Coalition Avenir Québec	Bernard Drainville	18,051	48.79	–8.50
Conservative	Karine Laflamme	7,677	20.75	+18.00
Parti Québécois	Pierre-Gilles Morel	4,775	12.91	+2.66
Québec solidaire	Valérie Cayouette-Guilloteau	4,244	11.47	–0.27
Liberal	Richard Garon	1,899	5.13	–9.33
Green	Mehdi Lahlou	213	0.58	–1.48
Climat Québec	André Voyer	138	0.37	–
Total valid votes		36,997	98.64	+0.17
Total rejected ballots		511	1.36	–0.17
Turnout		37,508	73.73	+2.33
Electors on the lists		50,875	–	–
