= Quebec Winter Carnival =

Annual festival in Canada

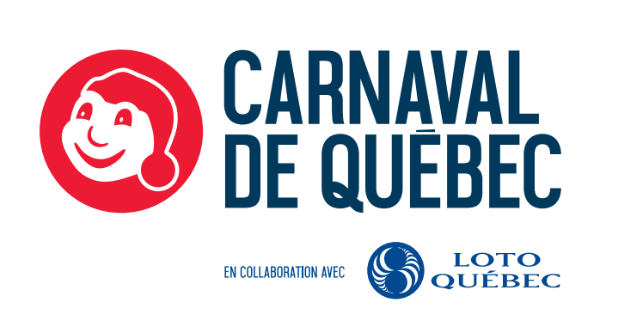
- Official logo of the Quebec Winter Carnival
- Genre: Carnival
- Date: February 5–14, 2027
- Location: Quebec City
- Country: Canada
- Inaugurated: 1955
- Website: carnaval.qc.ca
- 73rd (2027)

The Quebec Winter Carnival (French: Carnaval de Québec), commonly known in both English and French as Carnaval, is a pre-Lenten festival held in Quebec City, Quebec, Canada. After being held intermittently since 1894, the Carnaval de Québec has been celebrated annually since 1955. That year, Bonhomme Carnaval, the mascot of the festival, made his first appearance. Up to one million people attended the Carnaval de Québec in 2006, making it, at the time, the largest winter festival in the world (since overtaken by the Harbin Festival). It is, however, the largest winter festival in the Western Hemisphere.

== History ==
The tradition of celebrating from late January to mid-February originated during the early colonization of North America, when fieldwork was difficult in the winter. In Quebec City, the first major winter carnival took place in 1894, with interruptions caused by World War I, World War II and the Great Depression of 1929; it reappeared sporadically until the mid-20th century.

In 1955, under Mayor Wilfrid Hamel (1953–1965), it was popularized for tourism. The first modern Quebec Winter Carnival was held in 1955, adopting the arrowed sash as its cultural symbol.

== Bonhomme Carnaval ==
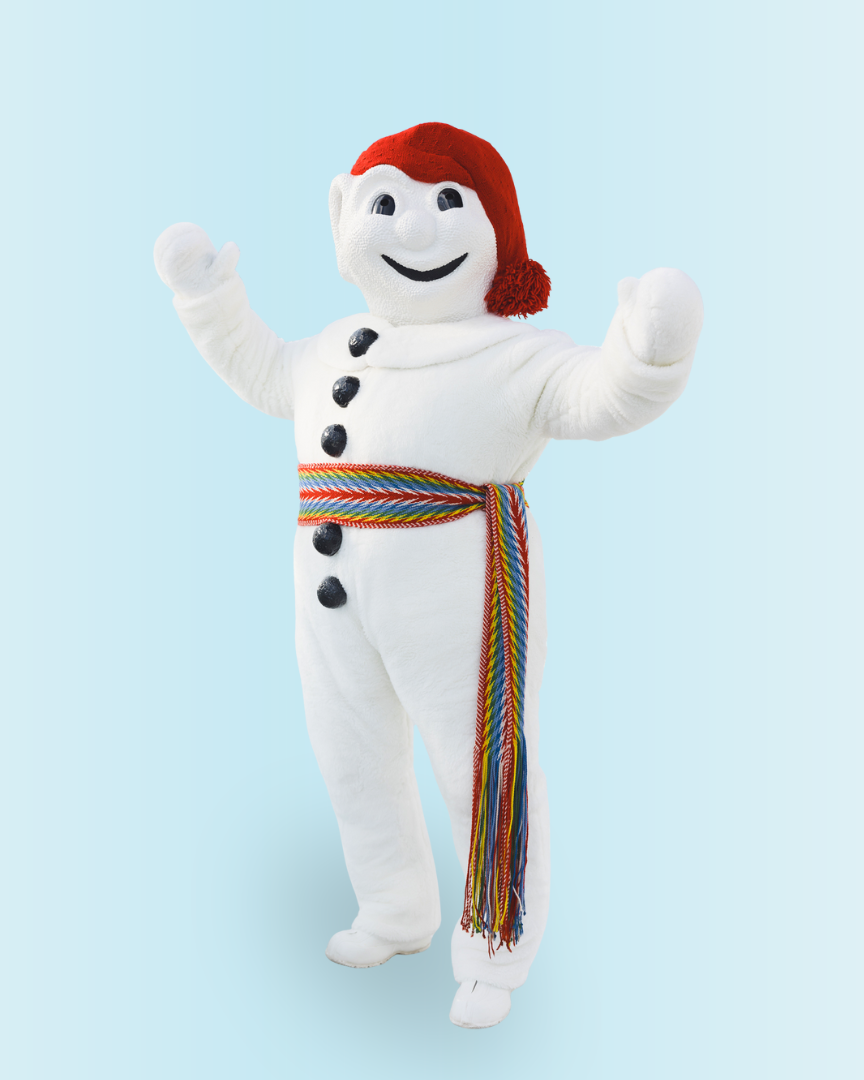
Bonhomme Carnaval, the mascot of the Quebec Winter Carnival.

Bonhomme Carnaval is the official mascot and ambassador of the Quebec Winter Carnival, white and dressed in a red toque and arrowed sash known as L'Assomption Ceinture fléchée.

Bonhomme made his first public appearance on January 9, 1955, in front of Porte Saint-Louis. At that time, Mayor Wilfrid Hamel presented him with the keys to Quebec City.

== Events and programming ==
Other major events include:

- A masquerade ball with up to 400 participants at the grand ballroom of the Château Frontenac
- The opening and closing ceremonies taking place at the Ice Palace before thousands of participants, Bonhomme and the mayor of Quebec
- Outdoor sport events (snowboarding, ice canoe, snowshoes, hockey, dog-sledding, etc., some of them part of World Championship tournaments) inside and outside the city
- Free outdoor public banquets (brunch, breakfast, etc.)
- The Canadian, Québécois, International and Student artist snow sculpture contests on the Plains of Abraham, the main setting of the carnival. The Plains are a public city park and stay open for leisure activities, including snowshoeing and cross-country skiing trails, during carnival time. Part of the Plains around the Citadel is transformed into an outdoor winter amusement park with various family-themed activities, including the display of the three main snow-sculpting contests (Canada's provinces, Quebec's regions, International) and the traditional bikini snow bath event (bain de neige).

Outdoor dance parties are held at the Ice Palaces.

- Kiosks and other outlets in the city sell the Bonhomme effigy tag that grants admission into most of the events, although some are free outside the main site.
- Most commercial main streets are decorated and some bars and restaurants set up a winter patio in front of their establishments.
- Bonhomme – short for bonhomme de neige ("snowman") is the official ambassador of the festivities, the castle lord of the Ice Palace. Bonhomme is described as a seven-foot-tall, four-hundred pound snowman sporting a red cap, black buttons and a ceinture fléchée that gives acknowledgement to French-Canadian and Métis style clothing.
- It is traditional to drink Caribou, a hot alcoholic beverage, to keep warm.
- The public auction is a fundraising event in aid of the carnival. This features many goods and services donated for silent auction and live auction.

== Feasts and restaurants ==
- The Business Leaders' Luncheon, organized by the Québec City Chamber of Commerce
- The 'Restaurant Partners' Campaign is a 179-day promotion during which Québec City restaurants offer customers a special menu for a fixed price throughout the carnival (including appetizer, soup, or salad, a main course, and a dessert).

== Former activities ==
- Quebec International Pee-Wee Hockey Tournament
- International Snow Sculpture Competition
- Bonhomme's Ball and Queen's Ball at the Château Frontenac
- Carnival Candle fundraiser
- Desjardins Square winter playground
- Soapbox Derby races

== Themes ==
=== 1970s ===
- 1972 – "A Carnival for Everyone"

=== 1990s ===
- 1990 – "At the Heart of the World"
- 1991 – "Taming Winter"

=== 2000s ===
- 2005 – "The Carnival Ignites"
- 2006 – "The Carnival Surprises"
- 2007 – "The Carnival Challenges You"
- 2008 – "The Carnival Sets the Tone"
- 2009 – "Join the Masquerade"

=== 2010s ===
- 2010 – "The Carnival Makes You Dance"
- 2011 – "The Real Winter Game"
- 2012 – "The Carnival Shows Its Colors"
- 2013 – "The Star of Winter"
- 2014 – "Completely Carnival"
- 2015 – "Bonhomme's World"
- 2016 – "My Carnival"
- 2019 – "Refreshing Carnival"

=== 2020s ===
- 2020 – "Stronger than the Cold"
- 2021 – "Cold or Not, I'm Going!"
- 2022 – "Unleash Your Fun"
- 2023 – "Shake Your Pom-pom"
- 2024 – "Get Up and Get Out!"
- 2025 – "Come On, Outside!"

== Queens and Duchesses ==
The duchesses appeared from 1955 to 1996, returned from 2014 to 2018, and were officially retired in 2018.

== Statistics ==
About 1,400 volunteers help organize the Carnival each year.

=== Visitors ===
- 1964 – 260,000 visitors
- 1994 – 500,000 visitors, including 20% from outside Quebec
- 2008 – 1.2 million visitors during Quebec City's 400th anniversary celebrations
- 2017 – 425,000 visitor-days
- 2018 – over 530,000 visitor-days

== Economic impact ==
The Quebec Winter Carnival is the largest winter carnival in the world and ranks third globally in attendance, after Rio de Janeiro Carnival and New Orleans Mardi Gras. In 2008, the event drew nearly one million participants, with a budget of C$8.9 million and direct economic spinoffs of about C$48 million. Over 100 international journalists cover it annually.

== Association ==
Since 2005, the Quebec Winter Carnival has been part of the Winter Urban Festivals Association, along with Toronto WinterCity Festival, Ottawa Winterlude, and Montréal en lumière. The goal is to share expertise and collaborate on international promotion.

== Books ==
=== Non-fiction ===
- Le Carnaval de Québec: une histoire d'amour, Georgette Lacroix (Québécor, 1984)
- Le Carnaval de Québec: la grande fête de l'hiver, Jean Provencher (Multimondes, 2003)
- La fièvre des festivals, Télé-Québec (TV documentary series)

=== Children's book ===
- Carnaval! Mardi gras! Carnaval! by François-Pierre Gingras (Essor-Livres, 2022)

== Gallery ==
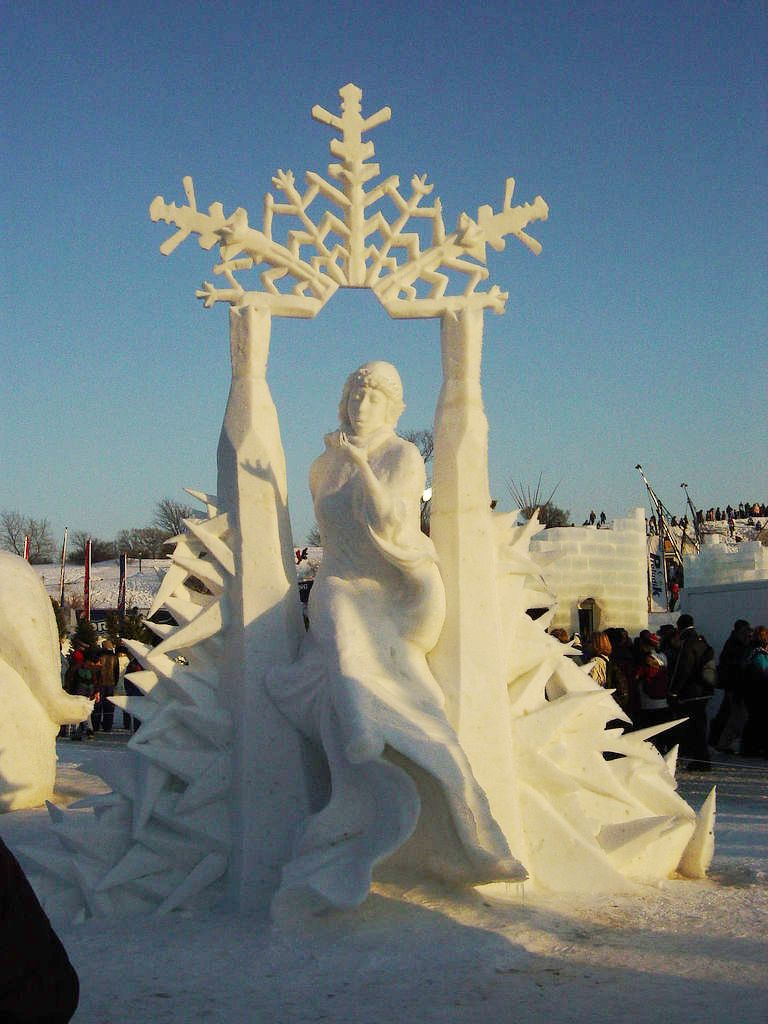
Ice sculpture (2005)

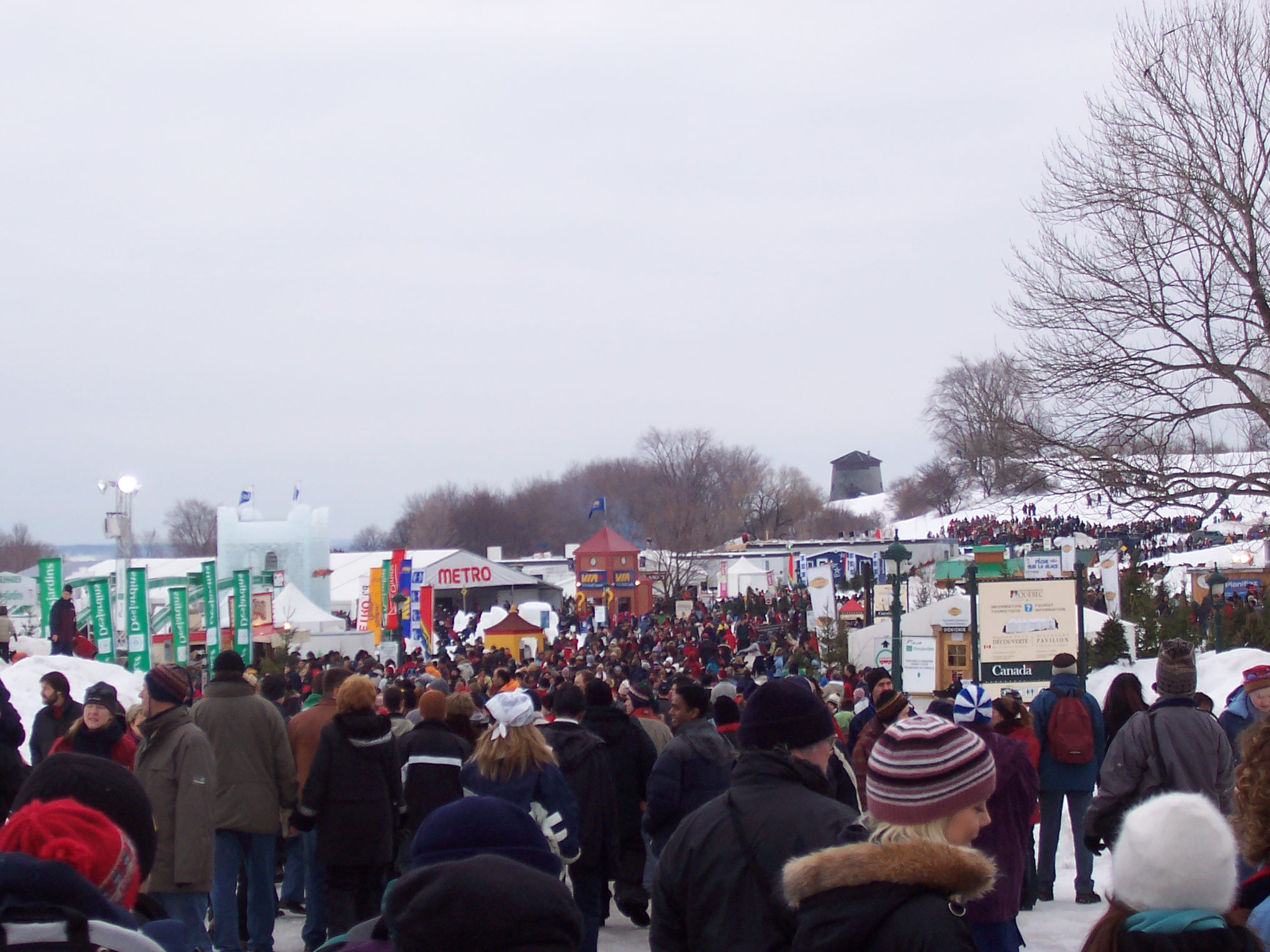
Family venue (2006)

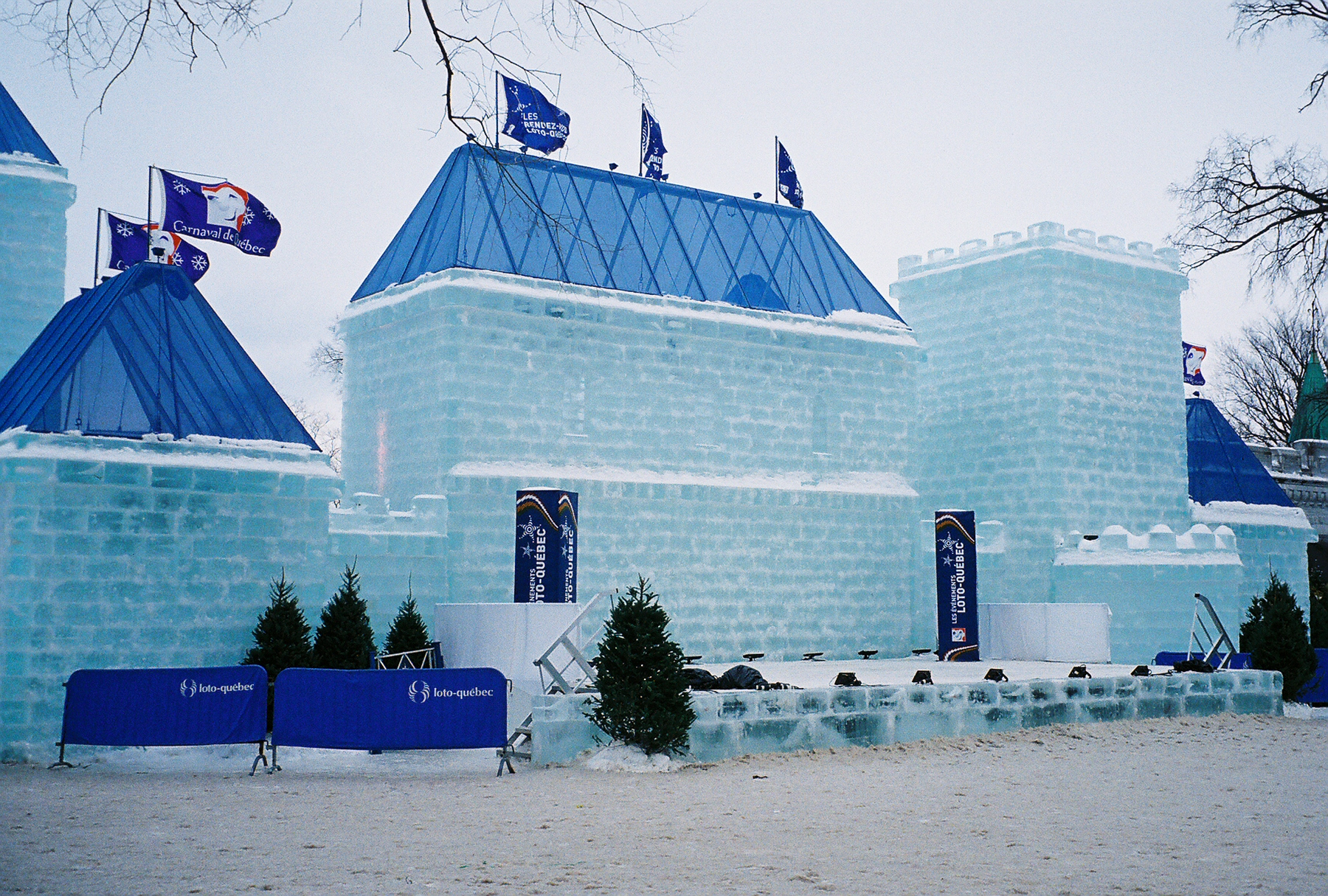
Ice Palace (2009)

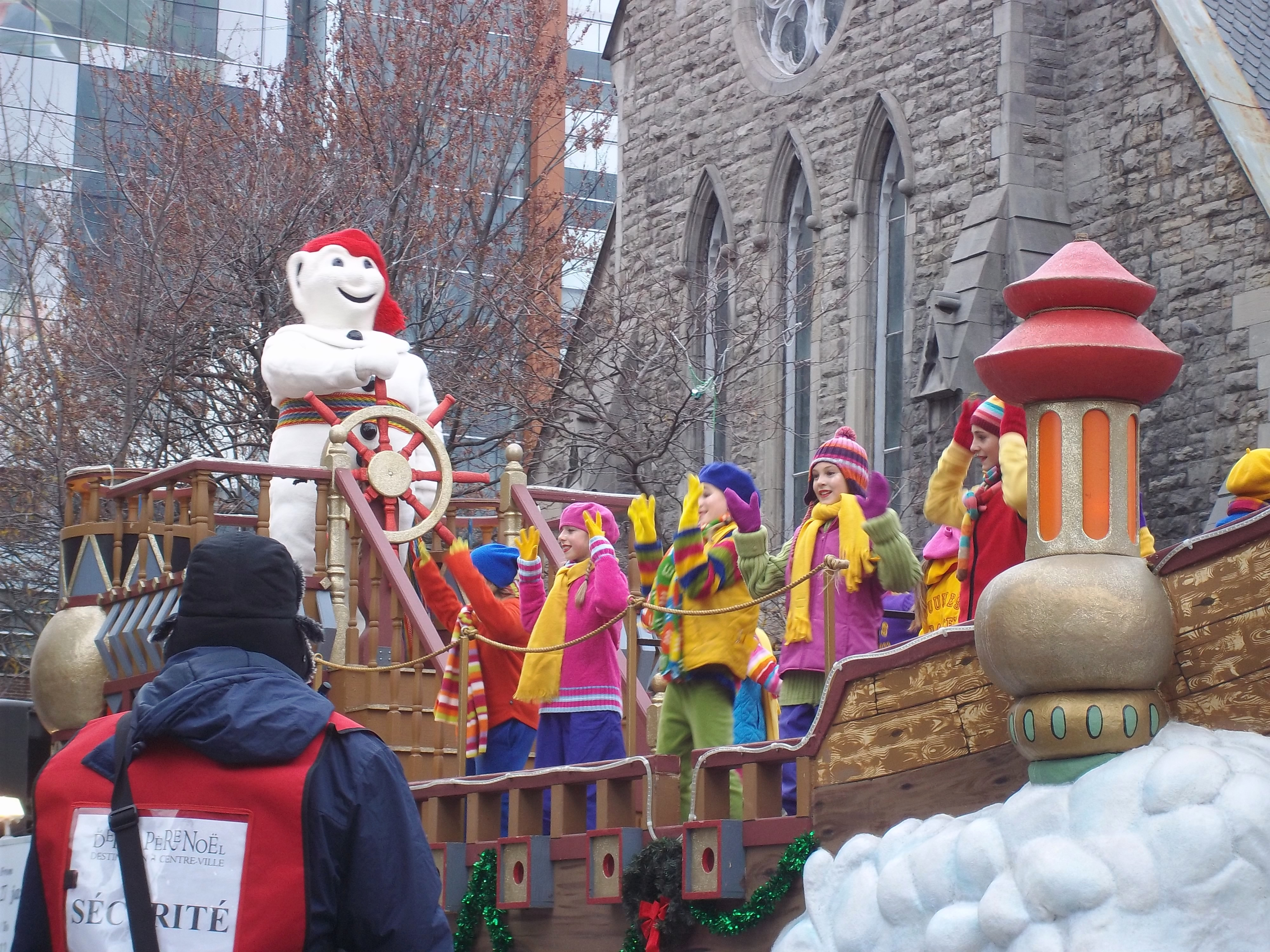
Parade in Montreal (2011)

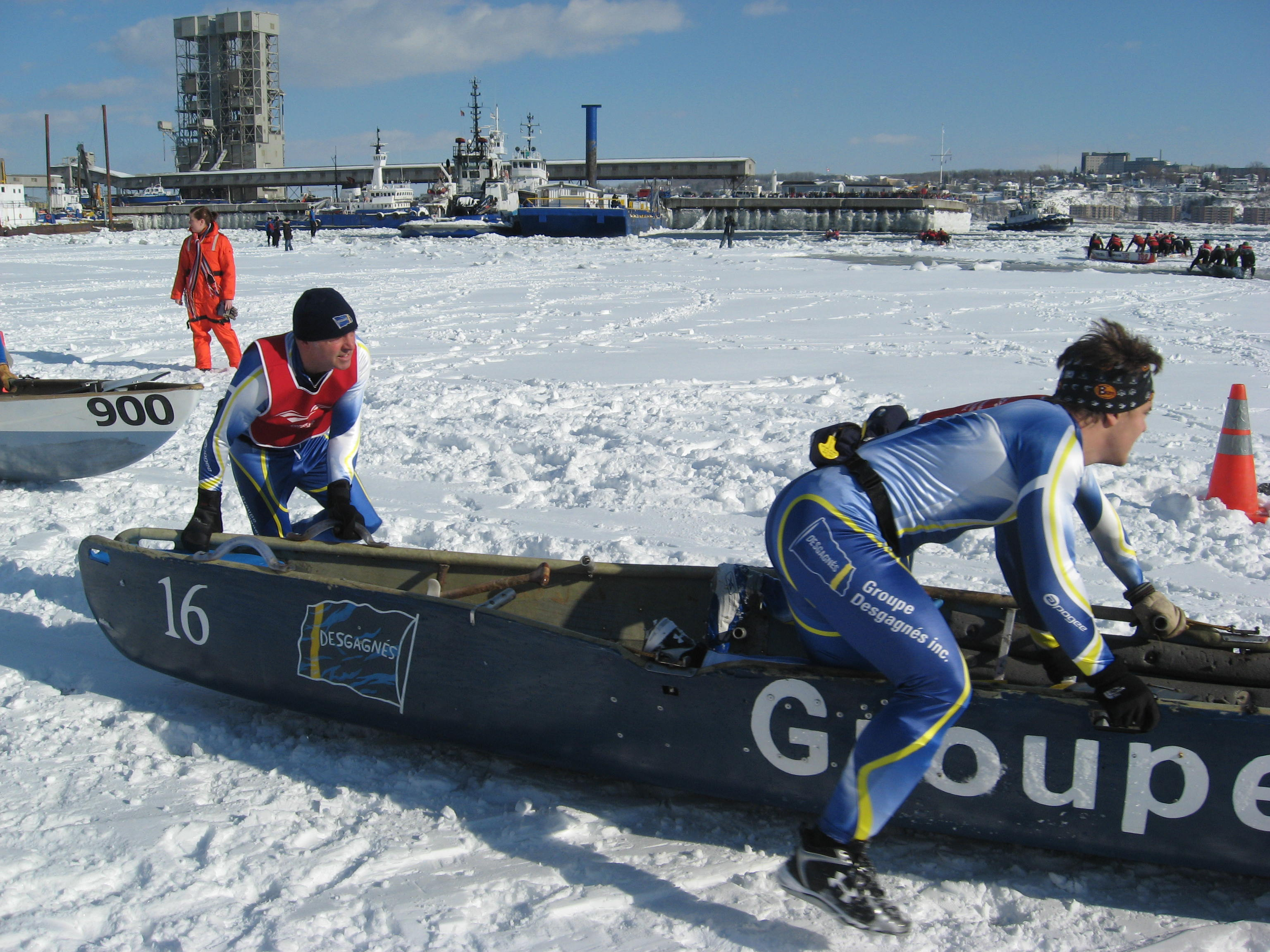
Canoe race (2011)

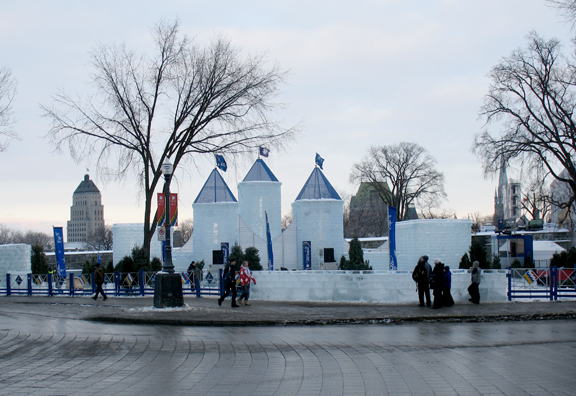
Ice Palace (2011)

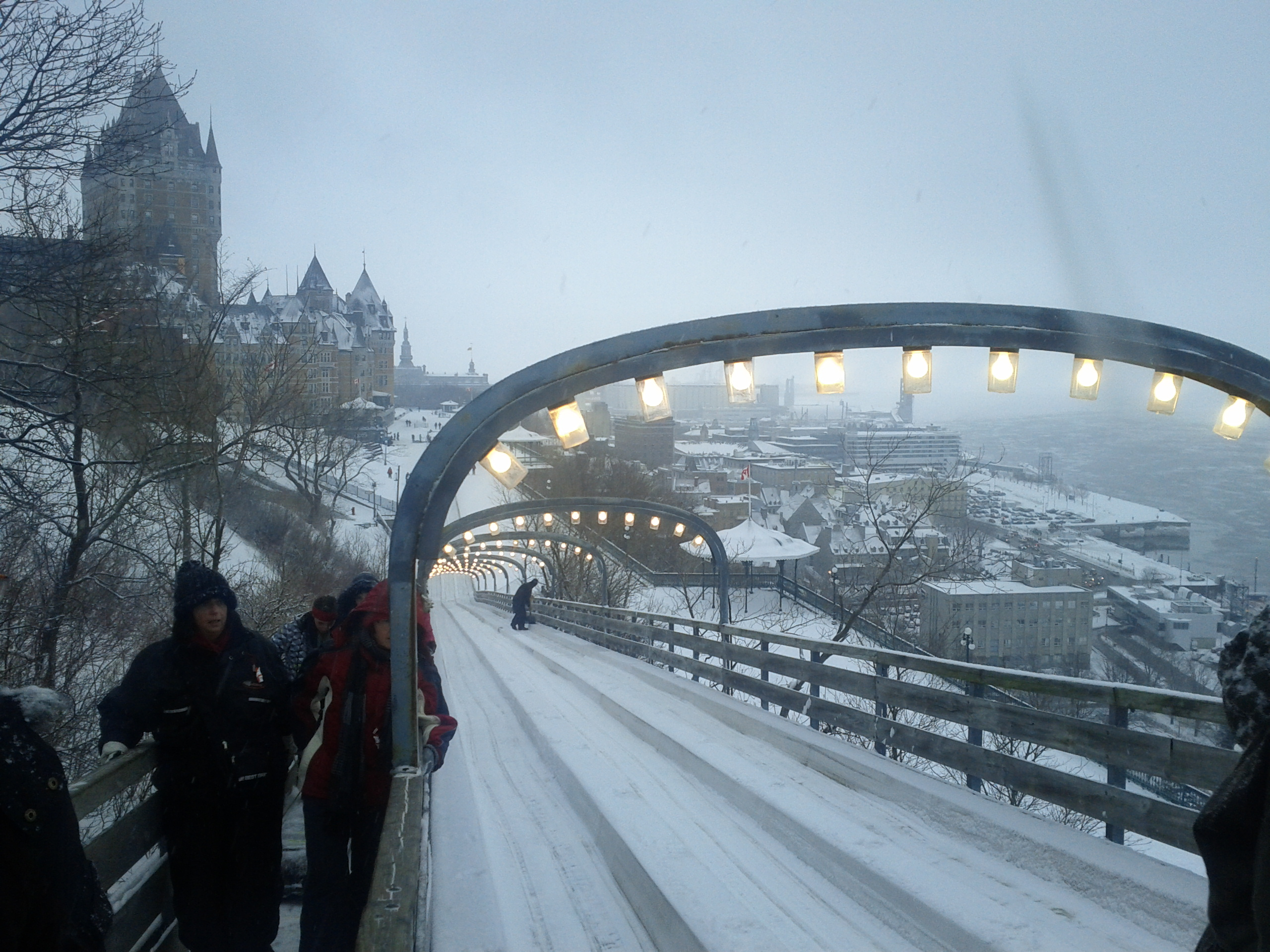
Toboggan at Terrasse Dufferin

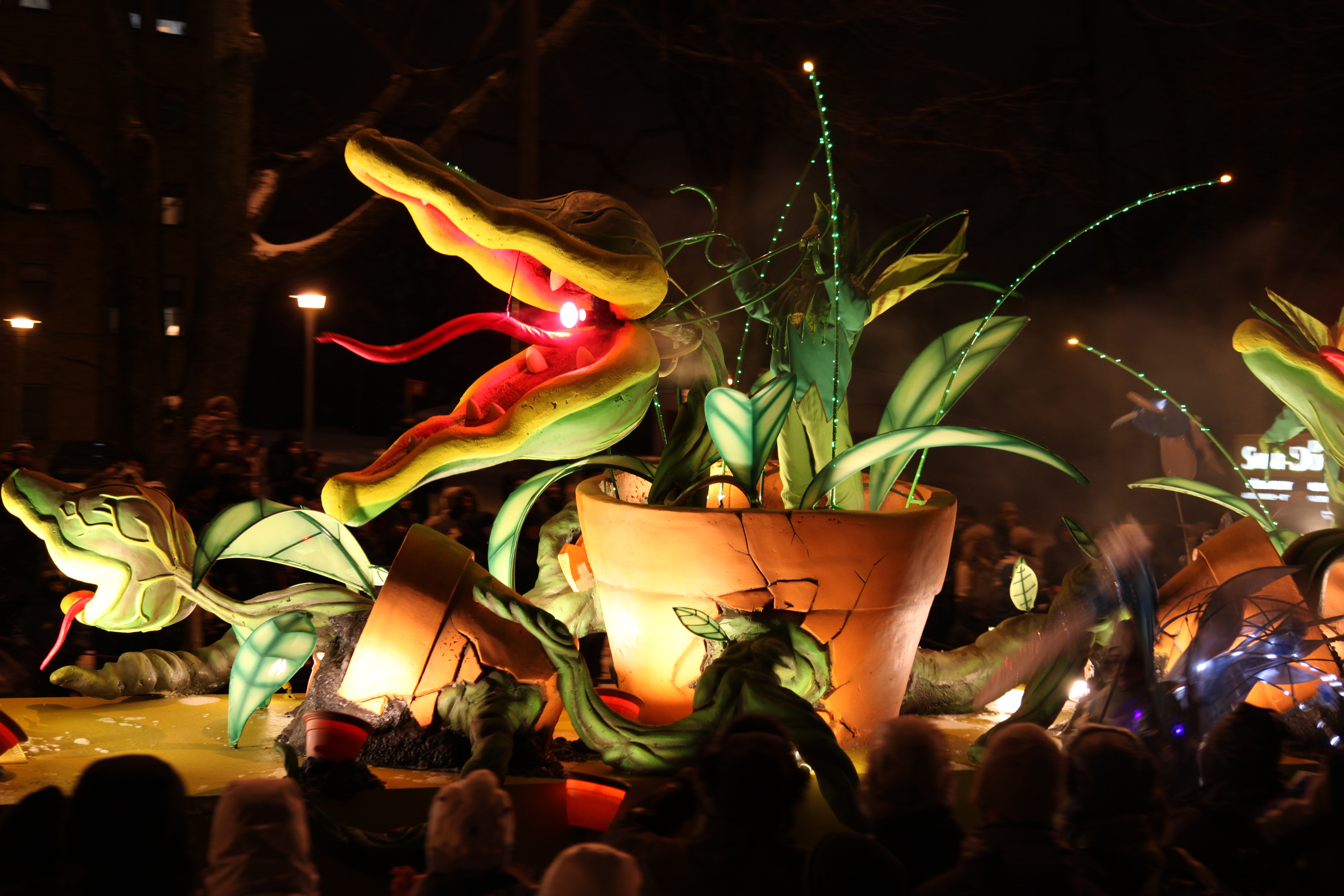

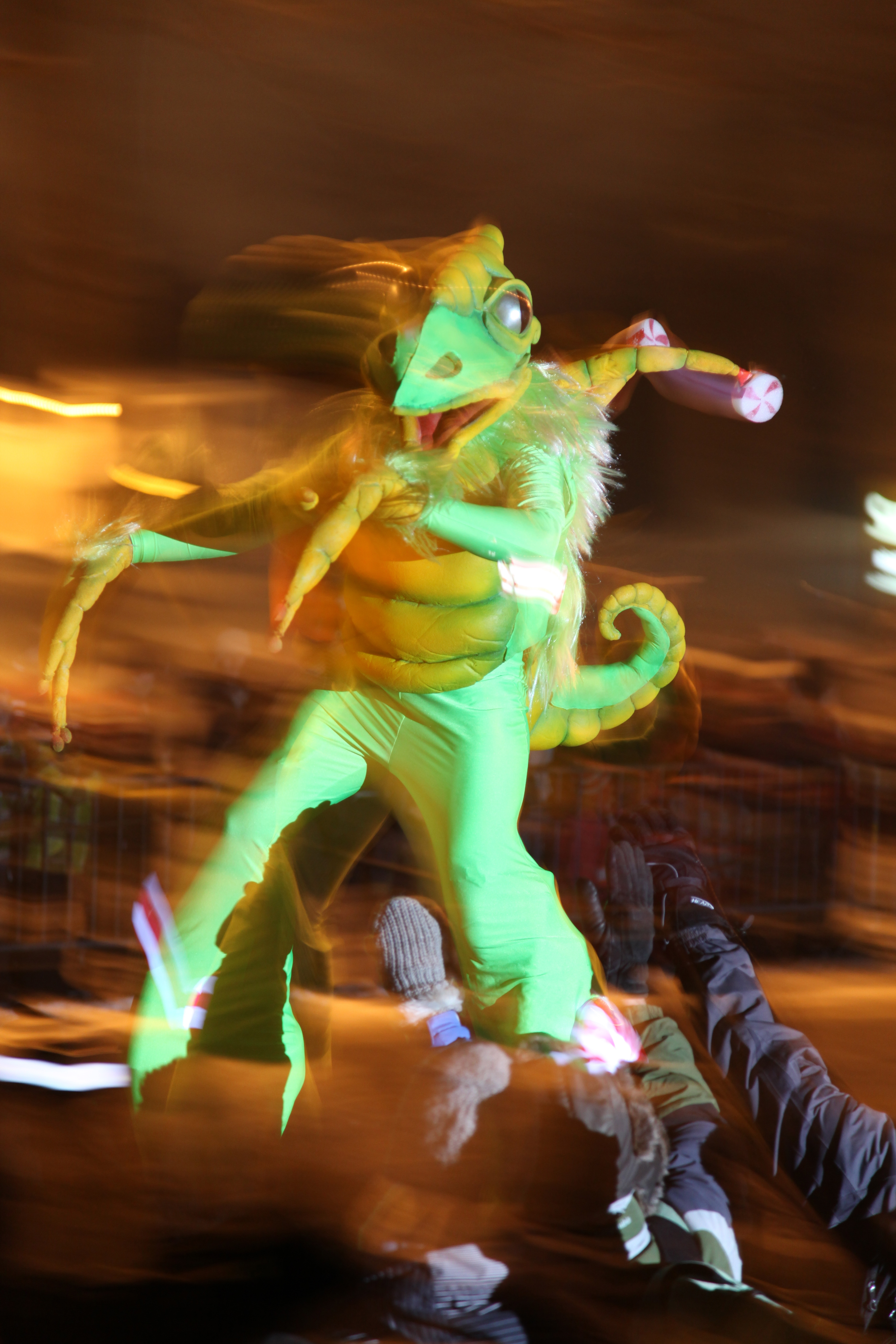

== See also ==
- List of festivals in Quebec
- Culture of Quebec
