= Angus Baker =

Canadian politician

Angus Baker (May 7, 1849 – August 10, 1924) was a navigator, ship's captain and political figure in Quebec. He represented Lévis in the Legislative Assembly of Quebec from 1892 to 1897 as a Conservative.

He was born in Saint-Nicolas, Canada East, the son of Édouard Baker and Mary Gaherty, and was educated at the Académie de Québec. Baker ran unsuccessfully for a federal seat in 1887 and again in 1912. He was defeated by François-Xavier Lemieux when he ran for a seat in the Quebec assembly in 1890. Baker was defeated by Lemieux when he ran for reelection in 1897. He was married twice: to Lydia Vallerand in 1873 and to Maria-Eugénie Beaudette in 1888. Baker died in Saint-David-de-l'Auberivière at the age of 75.
