= Collège de Lévis =

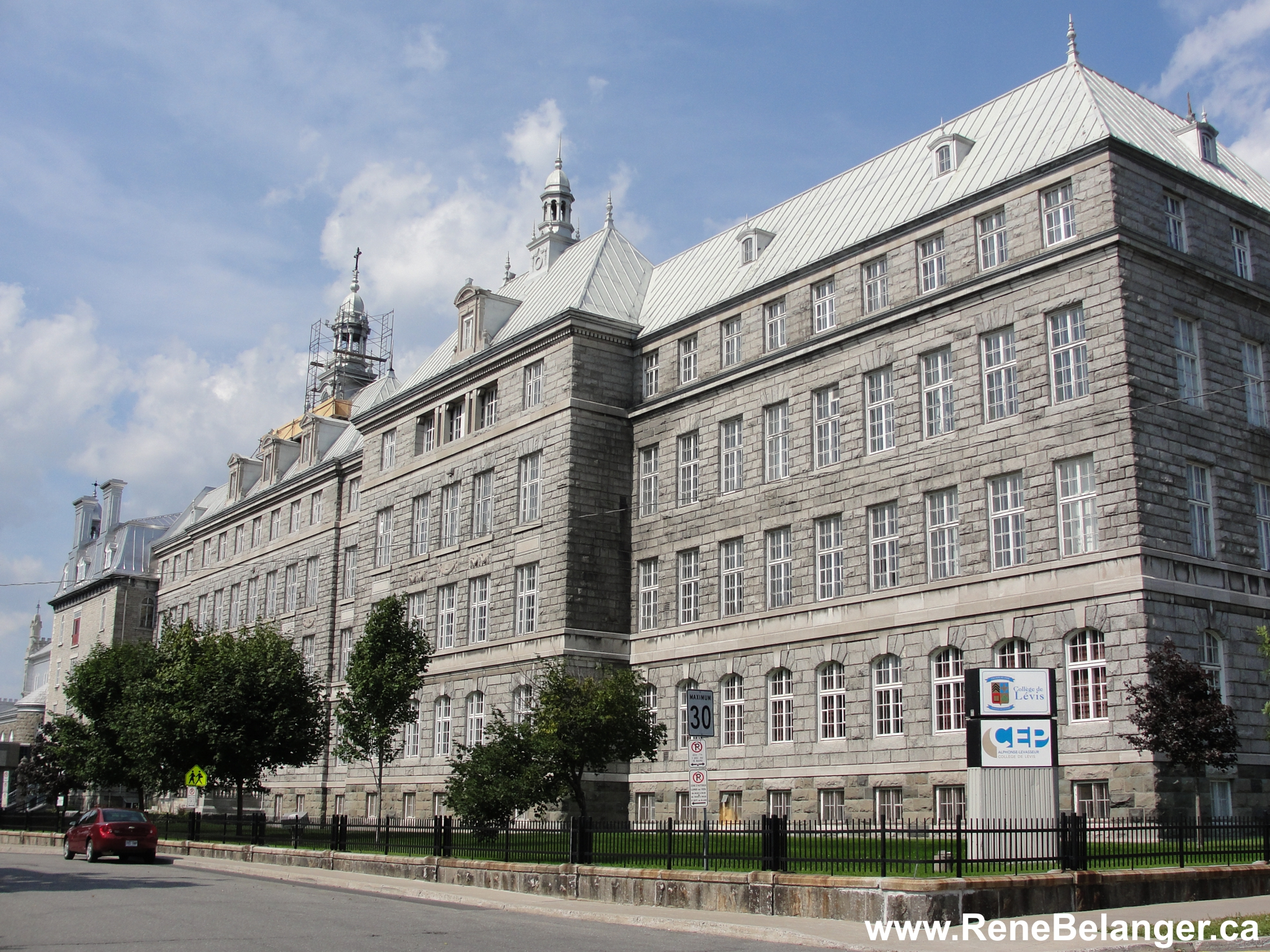
Collège de Lévis

The Collège de Lévis is a private Christian high school in Lévis, Quebec. It was founded in 1853 by Joseph-David Déziel. The school was the subject of the radio documentary Raconte-moi mon Collège de Lévis that was broadcast on Radio Canada in 2017. At the time that the documentary was made approximately 36,000 students had attended the school during its more than 160 year history. The school was only open to male students until 1968 when it became a co-educational institution. In 2024 the school built a new 21 million dollar sports complex on its property.

== Alumni ==
- Jean-Marie Beaudet (1908–1971), conductor, organist, pianist, radio producer, and music educator
- Alphonse Bernier (1861–1944), lawyer, judge, and politician
- André-Albert Blais (1842–1919), Roman Catholic priest and Bishop of Rimouski
- Victor Bouchard (1926–2011), pianist and composer
- Pierre Bourque (1938–2014), saxophonist and music educator
- Lewis Camden (born 1953), politician and civil servant
- Pierre-Émile Côté (1887–1950), politician
- Louis Julien Demers (1848–1905), merchant and politician
- Louis-Georges Desjardins (1849–1928), journalist and politician
- Jules Dugal (1888–1975), head coach
- Joseph-Fernand Fafard (1882–1955), surveyor and politician
- Marcel Fournier (born 1945), sociologist
- Pierre-André Fournier (1943–2015), prelate of the Roman Catholic Church
- Louis-Philippe Gauthier (1876–1946), physician and politician
- Paul Hébert (1924–2017), actor, director, and the founder of six theatres in Quebec
- John Hall Kelly (1879–1941), lawyer, politician and diplomat
- Claude Lachance (born 1945), politician
- Pierre Morency (born 1942), writer, poet and playwright
- Alfred-Valère Roy (1870–1942), politician
- Joseph-Edmond Roy (1858–1913), notary, editor, historian and politician
- Léopold Simoneau (1916–2006), lyric tenor
- Maurice Tanguay (1933–2021), Canadian businessman
- Élisée Thériault (1884–1958), lawyer and politician
- Adélard Turgeon (1863–1930), lawyer and politician
- Cyrille Vaillancourt (1892–1969), journalist, civil servant, businessman and politician
- Thomas Vien (1881–1972), politician
