= Maurice Tanguay =

Canadian businessman (1933–2021)

- Born: 20 September 1933; Saint-Philémon, Quebec, Canada
- Died: 25 February 2021 (aged 87); Lévis, Quebec, Canada
- Occupation: Businessman

Maurice Tanguay (20 September 1933 – 25 February 2021) was a Canadian businessman.

== Biography ==
Tanguay was born in 1933 in Saint-Philémon. His father, Romeo, was a mechanic and owned a bus company. He graduated from the Collège de Lévis, where he played ice hockey. He opened his first company in Montmagny, which was a Dodge and DeSoto dealership along with a Shell service station. He then sold his business in 1960 to open a furniture store, which he called Ameublement Tanguay. He was one of the first in the furniture market to offer credit to customers, which they could pay back after six months. He also acquired a dairy, which he used to gain extra financial traction while waiting for credit payments.

Tanguay was always interested in sports, and founded his own junior hockey club in 1957 in Montmagny. He simultaneously created other hockey and baseball clubs in and around Quebec City. At the same time, Ameublement Tanguay saw its business flourish, with $65,000 in sales in its first year and over $300 million in 2015. In 1987, he sold the business to Groupe BTMC.

In 1991, he created the Fondation Maurice-Tanguay, which aimed to help sick and disabled children in eastern Quebec. From its foundation to 2011, it had raised and distributed nearly $12 million.

In 1995, Tanguay acquired the Saint-Jean Lynx of the Quebec Major Junior Hockey League and subsequently moved them to Rimouski and renamed them the Rimouski Océanic. He administered the team until 2016, when he left it to his grandson, Alexandre Tanguay.

Maurice Tanguay died in Lévis on 25 February 2021 at the age of 87.

== Honors ==
- Member of the Order of Canada (2002)
- Queen Elizabeth II Golden Jubilee Medal (2002)
- Queen Elizabeth II Diamond Jubilee Medal (2012)
- Officer of the National Order of Quebec (2012)
- Induction into the Panthéon des sports du Québec (2016)
