= Alphonse Bernier =

Canadian lawyer, judge, and politician

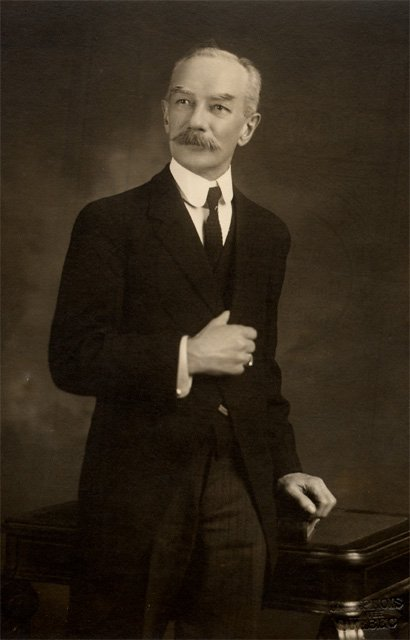

Member of the Legislative Assembly of Quebec for Lévis
- In office 1912–1916
- Preceded by: Laetare Roy
- Succeeded by: Alfred-Valère Roy

Personal details
- Born: April 7, 1861 Lévis, Canada East
- Died: October 7, 1944 (aged 83) Lévis, Quebec
- Party: Conservative
- Occupation: Lawyer, academic, and judge

Alphonse Bernier (April 7, 1861 – October 7, 1944) was a Canadian lawyer, judge, and provincial politician.

Born in Lévis, Canada East, Bernier studied at the Séminaire de Québec, Collège de Lévis, and Université Laval. He was admitted to the Quebec Bar in 1883. He received a PhD in law from Université Laval in 1887 and was created a King's Counsel in 1903.

He practiced law in Quebec City and was a professor of commercial and maritime law at Université Laval from 1889 to 1934.

He was mayor of Lévis from 1907 to 1917. He ran unsuccessfully as the Conservative candidate in the 1890 provincial elections in the riding of Dorchester and the Conservative candidate in the 1900 federal elections in the riding of Montmagny. He was elected to the Legislative Assembly of Quebec for Lévis in 1912. He was defeated in 1916 and was also defeated in the 1917 federal election in Lévis.

From 1921 to 1942, he was a judge of the Court of King's Bench.

He died in Lévis, Quebec in 1944 and was buried in the Mont-Marie Cemetery in Lévis.
