= Joseph-Théophile Larochelle =

Canadian politician

Member of the Legislative Assembly of Quebec for Lévis
- In office 1935–1939
- Preceded by: Arthur Bélanger
- Succeeded by: Joseph-Georges Francoeur
- In office 1944–1948
- Preceded by: Joseph-Georges Francoeur
- Succeeded by: Joseph-Albert Samson

Member of the Legislative Council of Quebec for La Salle
- In office 1948–1954
- Preceded by: Pierre Bertrand
- Succeeded by: Alfred-Albert Bouchard

Personal details
- Born: November 19, 1877 Saint-Henri, Quebec
- Died: October 8, 1954 (aged 76) Lévis, Quebec
- Party: Action libérale nationale Union nationale

Joseph-Théophile Larochelle (November 19, 1877 – October 8, 1954) was a politician of Quebec, Canada and a Member of the Legislative Assembly of Quebec (MLA).

== Early life ==
He was born on November 19, 1877, near Lévis, Chaudière-Appalaches and worked in Massachusetts for four years.

== Local politics ==
Larochelle served as a city councillor and as a school board member in Lévis.

== Member of the legislature ==
He ran as an Action libérale nationale candidate in the district of Lévis in the 1935 provincial election and won. Larochelle joined Maurice Duplessis's Union Nationale and was re-elected in the 1936 election. He was defeated by Liberal candidate Joseph-Georges Francoeur in the 1939 election.

== Political comeback ==
Larochelle was re-elected in the 1944 and 1948 elections. He became Minister without Portfolio in 1944.

== Legislative Councillor ==
He resigned in 1948 to accept a seat in the Legislative Council of Quebec and represented the division of La Salle until his death.

== Death ==
He died on October 8, 1954, in Lévis.
