= Alfred-Valère Roy =

Canadian politician

Alfred-Valère Roy Alfred-Valère Roy
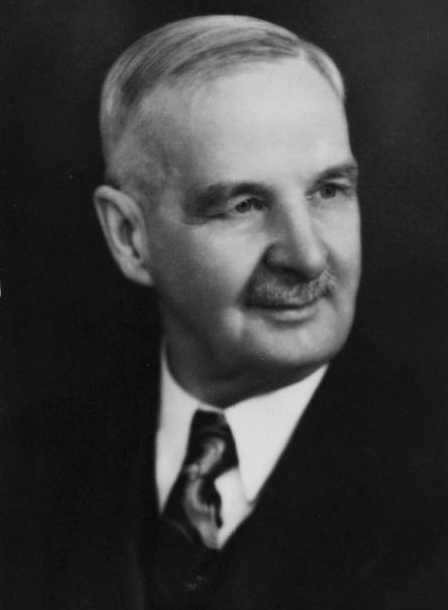

Member of the Legislative Assembly of Quebec for Lévis
- In office 1916–1930
- Preceded by: Alphonse Bernier
- Succeeded by: Arthur Belanger

Member of the Legislative Council of Quebec for De la Durantaye
- In office 1930–1942
- Preceded by: Georges-Élie Amyot
- Succeeded by: Cyrille Vaillancourt

Personal details
- Born: 3 May 1870 Bienville (Lévis), Quebec
- Died: 23 June 1942 (aged 72) Lévis, Quebec
- Party: Liberal

Alfred-Valère Roy (3 May 1870 – 23 June 1942) was a Canadian politician.

Born in Bienville (Lévis), Quebec, Roy was educated at the Collège de Lévis, the Séminaire de Québec, and the Université Laval. He became a physician in 1895. He was a surgeon in a hospital in Lévis. A Lieutenant Colonel in the 6e Régiment reserve, he was a member of the Knights of Columbus.

He was elected to the Legislative Assembly of Quebec for Lévis in 1916. A Liberal, he was acclaimed in 1919 and re-elected in 1923 and 1927. He was appointed to the Legislative Council of Quebec for the division of de La Durantaye on November 27, 1930. He served until his death in Lévis. His son Roger Roy was also a politician.
