= Louis-Georges Desjardins =

Canadian politician (1849–1928)

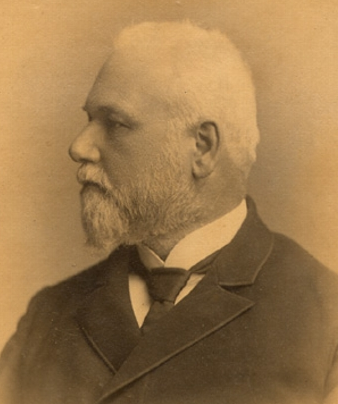

Member of the Canadian Parliament for L'Islet
- In office 1891–1892
- Preceded by: Philippe Baby Casgrain
- Succeeded by: Joseph Israël Tarte

Member of the Canadian Parliament for Montmorency
- In office 1890–1891
- Preceded by: Charles Langelier
- Succeeded by: Joseph Israël Tarte

Member of the Legislative Assembly of Quebec for Montmorency
- In office 1881–1890
- Preceded by: Charles Langelier
- Succeeded by: Charles Langelier

Personal details
- Born: May 12, 1849 Saint-Jean-Port-Joli, Canada East
- Died: June 8, 1928 (aged 79) Montreal, Quebec
- Resting place: Notre Dame des Neiges Cemetery
- Party: Conservative
- Other political affiliations: Conservative Party of Quebec

Louis-Georges Desjardins (May 12, 1849 – June 8, 1928) was a Canadian journalist and politician.

Born in Saint-Jean-Port-Joli, Canada East, the son of François Roy dit Desjardins and Clarisse Miville dit Deschênes, Desjardins was educated at the Collège de Lévis and at the Military College. A journalist, he was the editor-in-chief of newspaper Le Canadien from 1875 to 1880.

He was elected to the Legislative Assembly of Quebec for the electoral district of Montmorency in the 1881 election. A Conservative, he was re-elected in 1886 and was defeated in 1890. He was elected to the House of Commons of Canada for the electoral district of Montmorency in an 1890 by-election. A Conservative, he was re-elected in the 1891 election for the electoral district of L'Islet. He resigned in 1892 when he was appointed Clerk of the Legislative Assembly of Quebec, a position which he held until 1912.

He was also a Lieutenant-Colonel of the 17th Levis Battalion, Volunteer Militia.

After his death in 1928, he was entombed at the Notre Dame des Neiges Cemetery in Montreal.

== Bibliography ==
- Précis historique du 17e bataillon d'infanterie de Lévis depuis sa formation en 1862 jusqu'à 1872, suivi des ordres permanents du même corps (1872)
- M. Laurier devant l'histoire : les erreurs de son discours et les véritables principes du Parti conservateur (1877)
- De l'idée conservatrice dans l'ordre politique (1879)
- Considérations sur l'annexion (1891)
- A True and Sound Policy of Equal Rights for All. Open Letters to Dalton McCarthy (1893)
- Decisions of the Speakers of the House of Commons of Canada, 1867-1900 (1901)
- Décisions des orateurs de l'Assemblée législative de la province de Québec 1867-1901 (1902)
- l'Angleterre, le Canada et la Grande Guerre (1917)
- l'Harmonie dans l'union (1919)
