= Joseph-Alphonse Langlois =

Canadian politician

Joseph-Alphonse Langlois (French pronunciation: [ʒozɛf alfɔ̃s lɑ̃ɡlwa]; September 23, 1860 – May 25, 1927) was a politician Quebec, Canada and a Member of the Legislative Assembly of Quebec (MLA).

== Early life ==
He was born in Quebec City's St. Roch neighbourhood. He became president of the Société Saint-Jean-Baptiste for the Quebec area.

== Political career ==
Langlois ran as a Labour candidate in the provincial district of Saint-Sauveur in a by-election held on November 12, 1909 and won. He was re-elected in the 1912 election, but finished third and was defeated against Liberal candidate Arthur Paquet in the 1916 election.

National Assembly of Quebec
Preceded by Charles-Eugène Côté (Liberal)	MLA, District of Saint-Sauveur; 1909–1916	Succeeded by Arthur Paquet (Liberal)
