= John Hall Kelly =

Canadian politician

Member of the Legislative Assembly of Quebec for Bonaventure
- In office 1897–1914
- Preceded by: William Henry Clapperton
- Succeeded by: Joseph-Fabien Bugeaud

Member of the Legislative Council of Quebec for Grandville
- In office 1914–1939
- Preceded by: Thomas-Philippe Pelletier
- Succeeded by: François-Philippe Brais

Canadian High Commissioner to Ireland
- In office 1939–1941
- Succeeded by: John Doherty Kearney

Personal details
- Born: September 1, 1879 Saint-Godefroy, Gaspé Peninsula, Quebec
- Died: March 10, 1941 (aged 61) Dublin, Ireland
- Party: Liberal

John Hall Kelly (September 1, 1879 – March 10, 1941) was a Canadian lawyer, politician and diplomat.

Born in Saint-Godefroy, Gaspé Peninsula, Quebec, Kelly was educated at the Collège de Lévis, the University of St. Joseph's College, and at the Université Laval. He was called to the Bar of Quebec in 1903. He was created a King's Counsel in 1914. He practiced law in New Carlisle, Quebec specializing in corporate law. He was the president of the New Richmond Mining Co., North American Mining Co., Gaspé Mines, Cascapédia Mines and Paspébiac Mines. In 1905 he was the founder and president of the Bonaventure and Gaspé Telephone Company.

He was elected to the Legislative Assembly of Quebec for the riding of Bonaventure in 1904. A Liberal, he was re-elected in 1908 and 1912. He resigned in 1914 and was appointed to the Legislative Council of Quebec for the division of Grandville. He was named a Minister without Portfolio in the cabinet of Louis-Alexandre Taschereau in 1935. He resigned in 1939 and was named Canadian High Commissioner to Ireland.

He was the author of The Position of the Settler in the Province of Quebec published in 1907.

He died in Dublin, Ireland in 1941 and was buried in the Glasnevin Cemetery.
