= Charles Langelier =

Canadian politician (1850–1920)

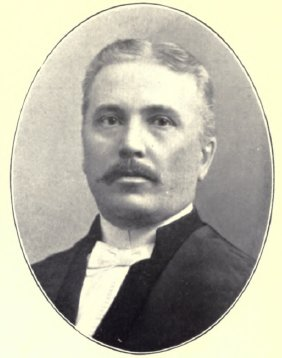

Member of the Legislative Assembly of Quebec for Lévis
- In office 1898–1901
- Preceded by: Nazaire-Nicolas Olivier
- Succeeded by: Jean-Cleophas Blouin

Member of the Canadian Parliament for Montmorency
- In office 1887–1890
- Preceded by: Pierre-Vincent Valin
- Succeeded by: Louis-Georges Desjardins

Member of the Legislative Assembly of Quebec for Montmorency
- In office 1878–1881
- Preceded by: Auguste-Réal Angers
- Succeeded by: Louis-Georges Desjardins

Personal details
- Born: 23 August 1850 Sainte-Rosalie, Canada East
- Died: 7 February 1920 (aged 69) Quebec City, Quebec, Canada
- Party: Liberal
- Relations: François Langelier, brother

Charles Langelier (23 August 1850 – 7 February 1920) was a Canadian lawyer, politician, judge, journalist, and author.

Born in Sainte-Rosalie, Lower Canada, the son of Louis-Sébastien Langelier and Julie-Esther Casault, Langelier attended the Séminaire de Saint-Hyacinthe, the Petit Séminaire de Québec, and Université Laval. He was called to the Quebec Bar in 1875 and practised law in Quebec City.

From 1878 to 1881, he was a member of the Legislative Assembly of Quebec for the electoral district of Montmorency. He was defeated in 1881 and again in 1886. He was also defeated when he ran for a seat in the House of Commons of Canada in the electoral district of Montmorency in the 1882 election. He was elected in the 1887 election. A Liberal, he resigned in 1890 to return to Quebec politics and was appointed president of the Executive Council. he would also serve as provincial secretary and registrar. He was defeated in 1892 and in 1897. He was elected again in 1898 and served until 1901 when he was appointed Quebec district sheriff. In 1910, he became a judge of the Court of Sessions of the Peace.

From 1883 to 1886, he was the co-owner and co-editor of L'Électeur, one of the first Liberal newspapers published in Quebec.He also wrote the following works: Éloge de l'agriculture (1891), Lord Russel de Killowen à Québec (1896), John Buckworth Parkin, avocat et conseil de la reine (1897), Souvenirs politiques de 1878 à 1890, récits, études et portraits (1909), la Confédération, sa genèse, son établissement (1916) and La Procédure criminelle d'après le code et la jurisprudence (1916).

He died in 1920. His brother, François Charles Stanislas Langelier, was also a Quebec politician.
