= François-Philippe Brais =

Canadian politician

François-Philippe Brais CC CBE QC
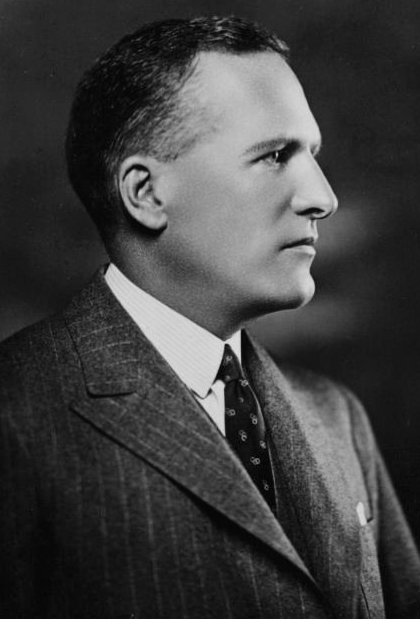

Minister without Portfolio, Quebec
- In office 1940–1944

Member of the Legislative Council of Quebec for Grandville
- In office 1940–1968
- Preceded by: John Hall Kelly
- Succeeded by: No-one. (Legislative Council abolished in 1968.)

16th President of the Canadian Bar Association
- In office 1944–1945
- Preceded by: Royal Lethington Maitland, KC
- Succeeded by: Esten Kenneth Williams, K.C.

Bâtonnier of the Barreau of Quebec
- In office 1949–1950
- Preceded by: Paul Henry Bouffard, K.C.
- Succeeded by: Édouard Asselin, K.C.

Personal details
- Born: October 18, 1894 Montreal, Quebec
- Died: January 2, 1972 (aged 77) Cowansville, Quebec
- Party: Liberal
- Spouse: Louise Doré
- Education: McGill University
- Profession: Lawyer

François-Philippe Brais, CC CBE QC (October 18, 1894 – January 2, 1972) was a Canadian lawyer and politician.

Born in Montreal, the son of Émilien Brais and Blanche Brunet, he studied at McGill University. He was called to the Quebec Bar in 1917 and began a legal career in private practice, specialising in insurance law. From 1922 to 1930, he was a Crown prosecutor in Montreal, being appointed King's Counsel in 1927. He appeared several times in the Supreme Court of Canada. He eventually served on many corporate boards, including the board of the Canadian Pacific Railway and Sun Life Insurance. He also served on the boards of many non-profit and charitable organizations, such as the Montreal Children's Hospital.

In 1940, Brais was appointed to the Legislative Council of Quebec representing the Grandville division. He served until the Council was abolished in 1968. In 1940, he was made a Minister without Portfolio in the cabinet of Liberal Premier of Quebec Adélard Godbout.

Brais was President of the Canadian Bar Association from 1944 until 1945. He then served as bâtonnier of the Montreal Bar in 1949, and bâtonnier of the provincial Barreau, 1949–1950.

In 1943, Brais was made a Commander of the Order of the British Empire. In 1945 the Université de Montréal awarded him a doctorate in law, honoris causa. In 1953, the Université Laval awarded him a second honorary doctorate in law. In 1970, he was made a Companion of the Order of Canada.

Brais died on January 2, 1972, at Cowansville. He was buried on January 5, 1972, at Notre-Dame-des-Neiges Cemetery in Montreal.

== See also ==
- "Biography". Dictionnaire des parlementaires du Québec de 1792 à nos jours (in French). National Assembly of Quebec.
- Office of the Governor General of Canada. Order of Canada citation. Queen's Printer for Canada. Retrieved 24 May 2010
