= Lucien-Hubert Borne =

Mayor Lucien-Hubert Borne
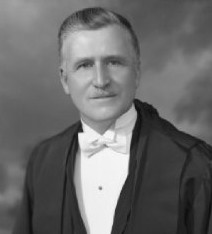

34th Mayor of Quebec City
- In office 1 March 1938 – 18 November 1953
- Preceded by: Joseph-Ernest Grégoire
- Succeeded by: Wilfrid Hamel

Personal details
- Born: 20 August 1884 Québec, Quebec, Canada
- Died: 23 December 1954 (age 70) Québec, Quebec
- Profession: Businessman

Lucien-Hubert Borne (French pronunciation: [lysjɛ̃ ybɛʁ bɔʁn]; 20 August 1884 – 23 December 1954) was a Canadian politician, serving as mayor of Quebec City from 1938 to 1953.

In 1936, Borne made an unsuccessful attempt to become a Liberal member of the Legislative Assembly of Quebec. Also in 1936, he made an unsuccessful first bid for the office of Quebec City's Mayor. Two years later, he defeated incumbent mayor Joseph-Ernest Grégoire and began a 15-year mayoralty career, through city elections in 1940, 1942, 1944, 1947 and 1950. He succeeded in attracting significant industrial development during his term in office, including the development of eight new industrial parks. Borne also promoted the replacement of streetcars with buses in Quebec city's transit system.

Borne resigned as mayor in November 1953 due to a heart condition and died the following year. He was survived by two daughters and two sons; his wife predeceased him.

Named after him in Québec are : rue Borne (named in 1955), centre Lucien-Borne and parc Lucien-Borne (named in 1991).
