= François Paradis =

Canadian politician (born 1957)

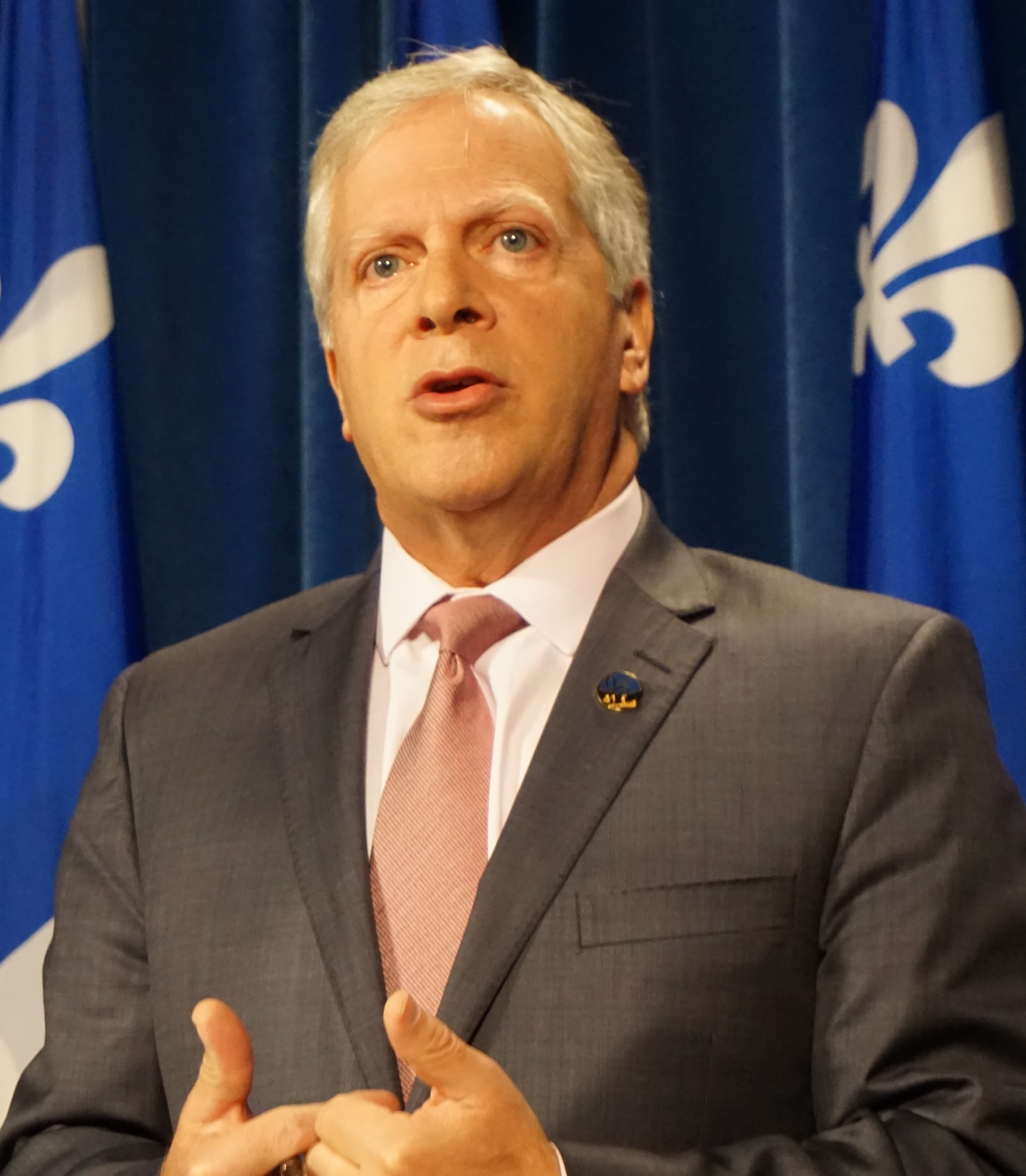
- Paradis in 2015

46th President of the National Assembly
- In office November 26, 2018 – November 28, 2022
- Preceded by: Jacques Chagnon
- Succeeded by: Nathalie Roy

Member of the National Assembly of Quebec for Lévis
- In office October 20, 2014 – August 28, 2022
- Preceded by: Christian Dubé
- Succeeded by: Bernard Drainville

Personal details
- Born: Joseph Louis François Paradis; March 26, 1957 (age 69) Sorel-Tracy, Quebec, Canada
- Party: Coalition Avenir Québec
- Spouse: Anne Gingras (m. 1994)
- Profession: Television journalist

Joseph Louis François Paradis (French pronunciation: [fʁɑ̃swa paʁadi]; born March 26, 1957) is a Canadian politician who was elected to the National Assembly of Quebec in a byelection on October 20, 2014. He represents the electoral district of Lévis as a member of the Coalition Avenir Québec (CAQ). After the 2018 Quebec general election Paradis was elected President of the National Assembly of Quebec.

Prior to his election to the legislature, Paradis worked for TVA, where he was a host of Café show, L'enfer ou le Paradis, Première ligne and TVA en direct.com.
