= Armand Bois =

Canadian politician

Armand Bois (French pronunciation: [aʁmɑ̃ bwa]; 1920-2001) was a politician in Quebec, and a Member of the National Assembly of Quebec (MNA).

== Background ==
He was born in Saint-Jean-Port-Joli, Quebec, on April 21, 1920, and served as a military officer during World War II. Subsequently, he became an army reservist and an insurance agent.

== Mayor ==
Bois served as Mayor of Les Saules, Quebec, from 1959 to 1963.

== Provincial politics ==
He ran as a candidate of the newly formed provincial wing of the Ralliement créditiste in 1970 and won, becoming the Member of the National Assembly for the district of Saint-Sauveur.

During his term of office, the party was plagued by internal divisions. While three MNAs remained loyal to Leader Camil Samson, the rest of the caucus withdrew its support and appointed Bois as temporary leader, until a leadership convention could determine a new leader.

A year later Yvon Dupuis was chosen as leader. Nonetheless, Bois and most of his colleagues lost their bid for re-election in 1973.

== Death ==
Bois died on August 31, 2001.

== See also ==
- History of Quebec

National Assembly of Quebec
Preceded by Francis Boudreau (Union Nationale)	MNA for Saint-Sauveur; 1970–1973	Succeeded by District divided into Taschereau and Vanier
