= Gilles Lehouillier =

Canadian politician and civil servant

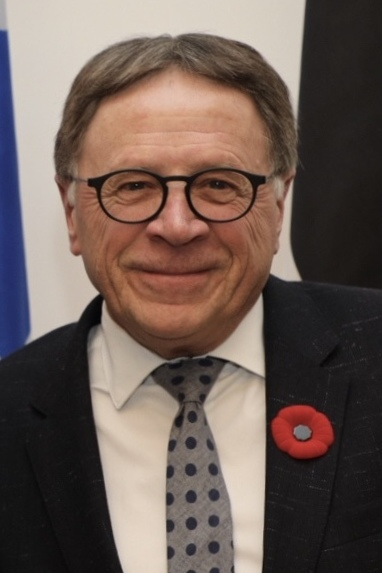
- Lehouillier in 2018

Mayor of Lévis, Quebec
- In office 2013–2025
- Preceded by: Danielle Roy Marinelli
- Succeeded by: Steven Blaney

MNA for Lévis
- In office 2008–2012
- Preceded by: Christian Lévesque
- Succeeded by: Christian Dubé

Personal details
- Born: Lévis, Quebec, Canada
- Party: Liberal
- Education: Université Laval

Gilles Lehouillier is a Canadian politician and former civil servant. He served as mayor of Lévis, Quebec, from 2013 to 2025. Lehouillier was previously the MNA for the riding of Lévis in the National Assembly of Quebec from 2008 to 2012. He is a member of the Quebec Liberal Party.

Lehouillier has a bachelor in communications and journalism from the Université Laval. He was involved in municipal politics particularly in the City of Lévis. He was a member of the executive council, member of various committees, vice-president of the Réseau Trans-Sud transit corporation and member of the executive committee for the economic promotion of the Quebec City metropolitan area. He also worked as a provincial public servant including as regional director for the Ministry of Municipal and Regional Affairs and had various duties related to communications agent.

He was elected mayor of Lévis in the 2013 Quebec Municipal elections on November 3, 2013, for his party, Lévis Force 10.
