= Simon-Napoléon Parent =

Premier of Quebec from 1900 to 1905

The Honourable Simon-Napoléon Parent KC
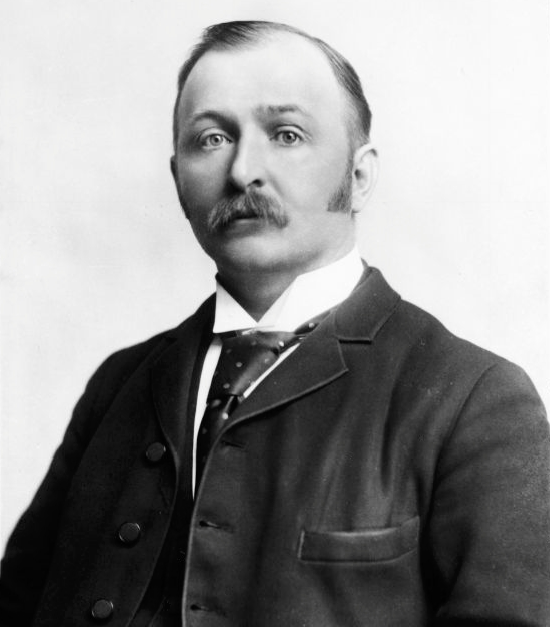

12th Premier of Quebec
- In office October 3, 1900 – March 21, 1905
- Monarchs: Victoria; Edward VII
- Lieutenant Governor: Louis-Amable Jetté
- Preceded by: Félix-Gabriel Marchand
- Succeeded by: Lomer Gouin

MNA for Saint-Sauveur
- In office June 17, 1890 – July 31, 1905
- Preceded by: District created
- Succeeded by: Charles-Eugène Côté

23rd Mayor of Quebec City
- In office April 2, 1894 – January 12, 1906
- Preceded by: Jules-Joseph-Taschereau Frémont
- Succeeded by: Georges Tanguay

Personal details
- Born: 12 September 1855 Quebec City, Canada East
- Died: 7 September 1920 (aged 64) Montreal, Quebec
- Party: Liberal
- Spouse: Clara Gendron (m. 1877)
- Children: 13
- Profession: lawyer

Simon-Napoléon Parent, KC (September 12, 1855 – September 7, 1920) was the 12th premier of Quebec from October 3, 1900 to March 21, 1905, as well as serving as President of the Quebec Bridge and Railway Company.

== Background ==
Parent was born in Quebec City. He was a lawyer by profession, and his son, Georges Parent, was an MP in the House of Commons of Canada and later a Senator who served as Speaker of the Senate of Canada.

== Political career ==
Parent ran as a Liberal candidate in the district of Saint-Sauveur in the 1890 election and won. He was re-elected in 1892 and 1897.

He resigned in 1897 when he was appointed to Félix-Gabriel Marchand's Cabinet but was re-elected in the subsequent by-election, as well as in 1900 and 1904. Marchand died in office on September 25, 1900, and Parent succeeded him. He won the 1900 election and the 1904 election and resigned in 1905 when 44 Liberal MLAs, led by Lomer Gouin, Adélard Turgeon and William Alexander Weir, pressured him to resign.

Parent also served as mayor of Quebec City from 1894 to 1906.

== Death ==
He died in Montreal in 1920.

== See also ==
- Politics of Quebec
- List of Quebec general elections
- Timeline of Quebec history
