= Nazaire-Nicolas Olivier =

Canadian politician

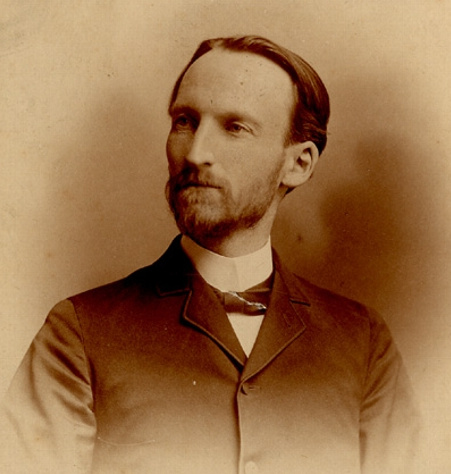
Nazaire-Nicolas Olivier

Nazaire-Nicolas Olivier (1860 – May 2, 1898) was a lawyer and political figure in Quebec. He represented Lévis in the Legislative Assembly of Quebec from 1897 to 1898 as a Liberal member.

He was born in Saint-Nicolas, Canada East, the son of Polycarpe Olivier and Olive Demers, and was educated at the Séminaire de Québec and the Université Laval. He was admitted to the Quebec bar in 1886 and set up practice at Quebec City. In 1889, he married Héloïse Roy. Olivier served as secretary for the Quebec bar. He was an unsuccessful candidate for a seat in the provincial assembly in 1892. Oliver was elected to the Quebec assembly in an 1897 by-election held after François-Xavier Lemieux was named to the Quebec Superior Court. He died in office in Quebec City at the age of 37.

Olivier published Octave Crémazie in 1888 and De la nullité des contrats in 1889.
