= Carole Théberge =

Canadian politician and marketing professional

Carole Théberge (born December 14, 1953) is a marketing professional and former political figure in Quebec. She represented Lévis in the Quebec National Assembly as a Liberal from 2003 to 2007.

She was born in Saint-Philémon, Quebec, the daughter of Alcide Théberge and Alma Roy, and was educated at the Cégep Lévis-Lauzon. Théberge worked in the field of marketing and public relations and also served on the board of directors for the Carnaval de Québec. She was a member of the city council for Lac-Saint-Joseph from 1998 to 2002. Théberge served in the Quebec cabinet as Minister for Family Welfare and as Ministry of Families, Seniors and the Status of Women. She was defeated when she ran for reelection in 2007. After leaving politics, she was administrator for Boîte à sciences and a member of the Centre hospitalier universitaire de Québec foundation.
