= 1900 Quebec general election =

Canadian provincial election

- December 7, 1900

74 seats in the 10th Legislative Assembly of Quebec 38 seats were needed for a majority
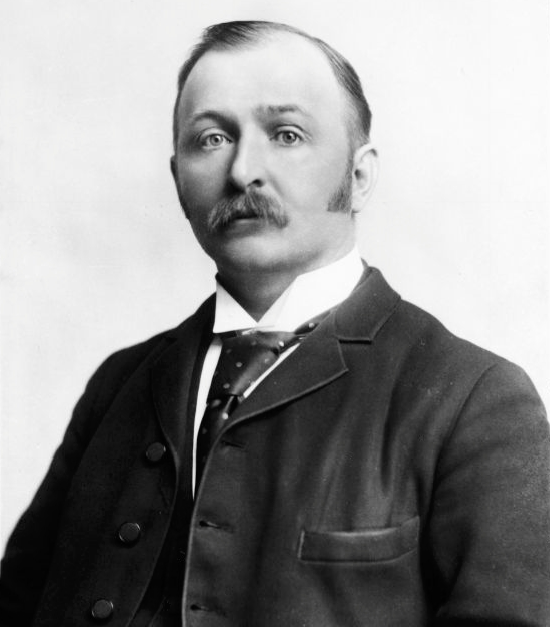

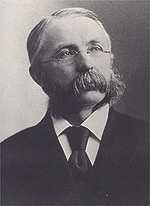
| | First party | Second party |
|---|---|---|
| Leader | Simon-Napoléon Parent | Edmund James Flynn |
| Party | Liberal | Conservative |
| Leader since | 1900 | 1896 |
| Leader's seat | Saint-Sauveur | Gaspé |
| Last election | 51 seats, 53.28% | 23 seats, 43.82% |
| Seats won | 67 | 7 |
| Seat change | ▲16 | ▼16 |
| Popular vote | 54,957 | 43,277 |
| Percentage | 53.15% | 41.85% |
| Swing | ▼0.13pp | ▼1.97pp |
Premier before election
Simon-Napoléon Parent
Liberal
Premier after election
Simon-Napoléon Parent
Liberal

The 1900 Quebec general election was held on December 7, 1900, to elect members of the Legislative Assembly of the province of Quebec, Canada. The incumbent Quebec Liberal Party, led by Simon-Napoléon Parent, was re-elected, defeating the Quebec Conservative Party, led by Edmund James Flynn.

The turnout was 29.77%.

== Results ==
| Party | Party leader | # of candidates | Seats | | | Popular Vote | | |
| Party | Party leader | # of candidates | 1897 | Elected | % Change | # | % | % Change |
|---|---|---|---|---|---|---|---|---|
| Liberal | Simon-Napoléon Parent | | 51 | 67 | +31.4% | 54,957 | 53.15% | -0.13% |
| Conservative | Edmund James Flynn | | 23 | 7 | -69.6% | 43,277 | 41.85% | -1.97% |
| Other | | | - | - | - | 5,168 | 5.00% | +2.1% |
| Total | | | 74 | 74 | -% | 103,402 | 100% | |

Popular vote
| PLQ | 53.15% |
| PCQ | 41.85% |
| Others | 5.00% |

Seats summary
| PLQ | 90.54% |
| PCQ | 9.46% |

== See also ==
- List of Quebec premiers
- Politics of Quebec
- Timeline of Quebec history
- List of Quebec political parties
- 10th Legislative Assembly of Quebec
