= Christian Dubé (politician) =

Canadian politician (born 1956)

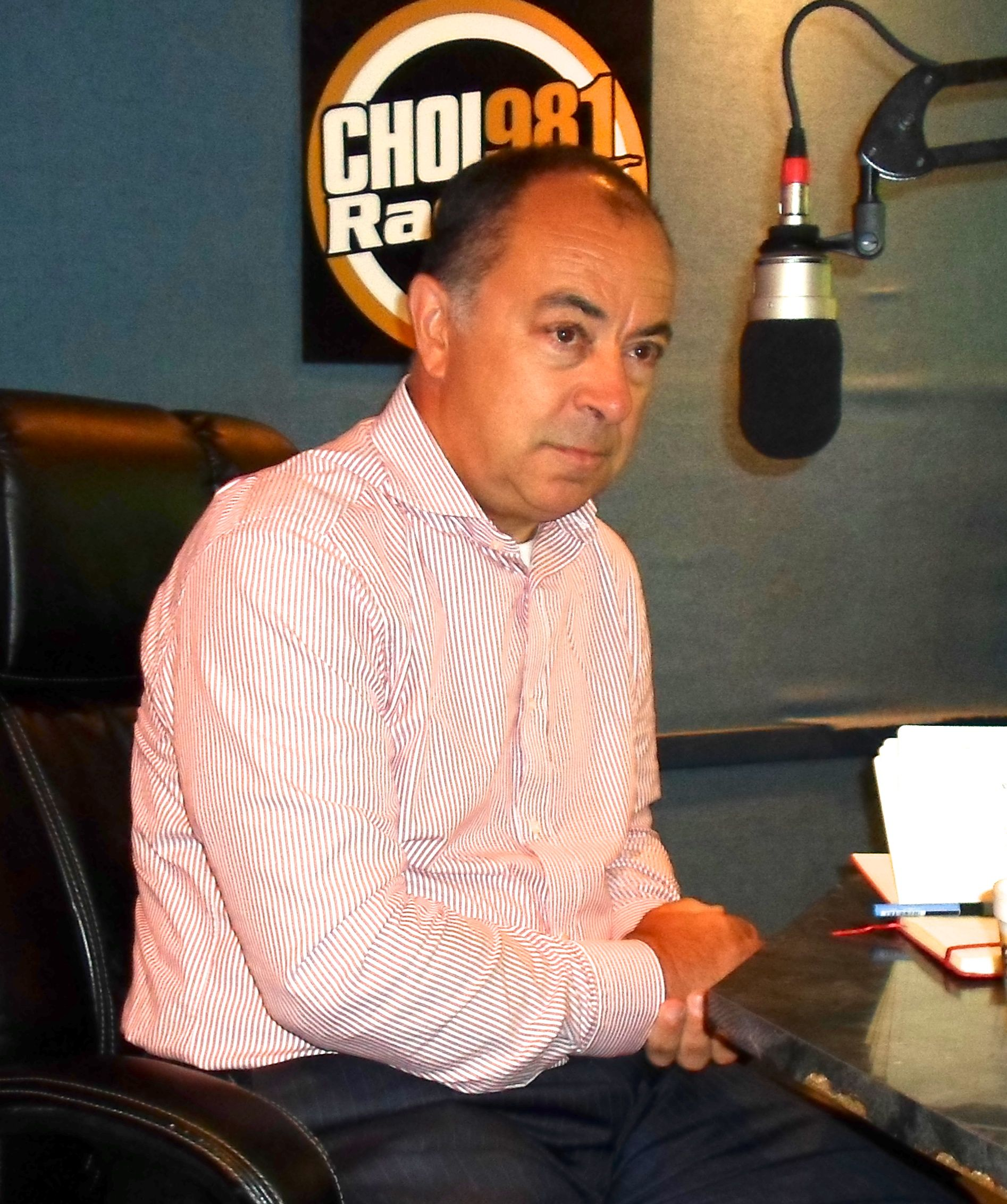
- Dubé in 2012

Member of the National Assembly of Quebec for La Prairie
- In office 1 October 2018 – 27 August 2026
- Preceded by: Richard Merlini
- Succeeded by: Sonia Ziadé

Minister of Health
- In office 22 June 2020 – 18 December 2025
- Preceded by: Danielle McCann
- Succeeded by: Sonia Bélanger

Member of the National Assembly of Quebec for Lévis
- In office 4 September 2012 – 15 August 2014
- Preceded by: Gilles Lehouillier
- Succeeded by: François Paradis

Personal details
- Born: October 3, 1956 (age 70) Quebec City, Quebec, Canada
- Party: Independent
- Other political affiliations: Coalition Avenir Québec (before 2025)
- Education: Université Laval
- Profession: Chartered Accountant, businessman

Christian Dubé (born 3 October 1956) is a Canadian politician who served as a member of the National Assembly of Quebec for the riding of La Prairie from 2018 to 2026. A prominent member of François Legault's Coalition Avenir Québec government, he served as Minister of Health and Social Services from 2020 to 2025.

== Political career ==
He was first elected in the 2012 election as the representative of Lévis for the Coalition Avenir Québec (CAQ), and was re-elected in 2014.

On 15 August 2014, Dubé resigned his seat to take a job at the Caisse de dépôt et placement. On 3 September 2018, Dubé announced that he would run for the 2018 election in the riding of La Prairie, replacing Stéphane Le Bouyonnec as the CAQ's candidate. He would defeat Liberal incumbent Richard Merlini.

On 22 June 2020, as part of a Cabinet shuffle, Dubé was named the new Minister of Health and Social Services, succeeding Danielle McCann.

On 18 December 2025, he resigned as Minister of Health and Social Services, leaving the CAQ to sit as an independent. He resigned after the government's controversial Bill 2 was revised, rolling back many reforms that caused tensions with doctors' unions. He did not seek re-election in the 2026 general election.

== Electoral record ==
2022 Quebec general election: La Prairie
Party	Candidate	Votes	%	±%
Coalition Avenir Québec	Christian Dubé	18,229	52.71	+9.57
Liberal	Julie Guertin	4,791	13.85	–10.14
Québec solidaire	Pierre-Marc Allaire-Daly	4,531	13.10	+0.03
Parti Québécois	Sarah Joly-Simard	3,950	11.42	–4.31
Conservative	Marie Pelletier	2,751	7.95	+6.82
Climat Québec	Barbara Joannette	281	0.81	–
Marxist–Leninist	Normand Chouinard	50	0.14	+0.02
Total valid votes		34,583	99.05	+0.66
Total rejected ballots		330	0.95	–0.66
Turnout		34,913	72.50	–2.85
Electors on the lists		48,158	–	–

2018 Quebec general election: La Prairie
Party	Candidate	Votes	%	±%
Coalition Avenir Québec	Christian Dubé	14,511	43.14	+10.52
Liberal	Richard Merlini	8,069	23.99	-9.96
Parti Québécois	Cathy Lepage	5,290	15.73	-10.52
Québec solidaire	Daniel Blouin	4,362	12.97	+7.05
Green	Alexandre Caron	694	2.06	
Conservative	Alain Desmarais	379	1.13	
New Democratic	Boukare Tall	222	0.66	
Parti 51	Liana Minato	66	0.2	
Marxist–Leninist	Normand Chouinard	41	0.12	
Total valid votes		33,634	98.39	
Total rejected ballots		549	1.61	
Turnout		34,183	74.85	
Eligible voters		45,669		
Coalition Avenir Québec gain from Liberal		Swing		+10.24
Source(s) "Rapport des résultats officiels du scrutin". Élections Québec.

== Cabinet posts ==
Quebec provincial government of François Legault
Cabinet posts (2)
Predecessor	Office	Successor
Pierre Arcand	Minister Responsible for Government Administration and President of the Treasury Board; 18 October 2018–22 June 2020	Sonia LeBel
Danielle McCann	Minister of Health and Social Services; 22 June 2020–18 December 2025	Sonia Bélanger
