= Wilfrid Hamel =

Canadian politician

Mayor Wilfrid Hamel
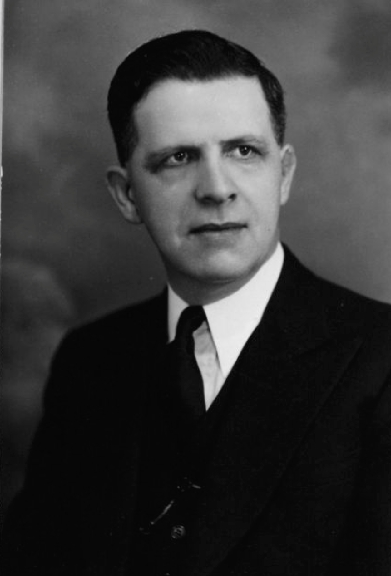

Member of the Legislative Assembly of Quebec for Saint-Sauveur
- In office 1939–1948

35th Mayor of Quebec City
- In office 15 December 1953 – 1 December 1965
- Preceded by: Lucien-Hubert Borne
- Succeeded by: Gilles Lamontagne

Personal details
- Born: 16 July 1895 Ancienne-Lorette, Quebec, Canada
- Died: 31 December 1968 (aged 73) Quebec City, Quebec, Canada
- Spouse: Marie-Célina Martel (m. 11 June 1917)

Wilfrid Hamel (16 July 1895 – 31 December 1968) was a Canadian politician, serving as a member of the Legislative Assembly of Quebec and as Mayor of Quebec City.

His early career began in 1913 at the company Maranda et Labrecque, becoming a director there from 1925 to 1941. From 1940 to 1942, he was a church warden for the Sacré-Coeur-de-Jésus Roman Catholic congregation.

In 1939, he was elected as a Liberal provincial member of Quebec's assembly in Saint-Sauveur riding and served in the cabinet of Premier Adélard Godbout as Minister of State and Minister of Land and Forests. Hamel was re-elected at Saint-Sauveur in 1944, but was defeated in the 1948 and 1952 elections.

Hamel was Mayor of Quebec City for twelve years, beginning in December 1953.
