= William Henry Clapperton =

Canadian politician

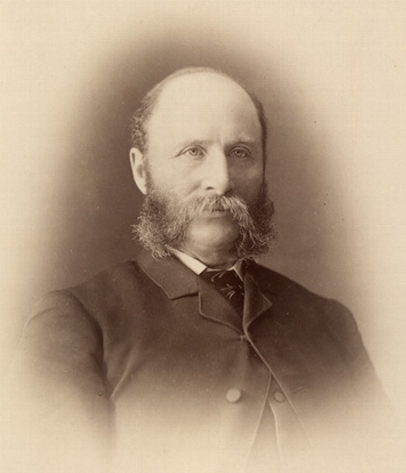

Member of the Legislative Assembly of Quebec for Bonaventure
- In office 1897–1904
- Preceded by: François-Xavier Lemieux
- Succeeded by: John Hall Kelly

Personal details
- Born: January 27, 1839 Carleton, Lower Canada
- Died: May 31, 1922 (aged 83) Maria, Quebec
- Party: Liberal

William Henry Clapperton (January 27, 1839 – May 31, 1922) was a Canadian politician in the province of Quebec.

Born in Carleton, Lower Canada, the son of John Clapperton and Félicité Dugas, Clapperton went to live in Scotland after the death of his father when he was nine months. Returning to Canada after his studies he became a fish merchant and later was an Agent of Crown land in the county of Bonaventure from 1891 to 1921.

He ran as a candidate in the 1878 federal election in the riding of Bonaventure but was defeated by Théodore Robitaille. He was elected to the Legislative Assembly of Quebec for Bonaventure in an 1897 by-election. A Liberal, he was re-elected in 1900 but was defeated in 1904.

He died in Maria, Quebec in 1922.
