= François-Xavier Lemieux (Quebec MLA) =

Canadian politician

Sir François-Xavier Lemieux
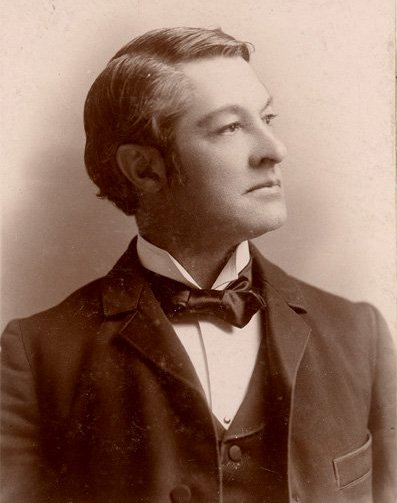

Member of the Legislative Assembly of Quebec for Lévis
- In office 1883–1892
- Preceded by: Étienne-Théodore Pâquet
- Succeeded by: Angus Baker

Member of the Legislative Assembly of Quebec for Bonaventure
- In office 1894–1897
- Preceded by: Honoré Mercier
- Succeeded by: William Henry Clapperton

Personal details
- Born: April 9, 1851 Lévis, Canada East
- Died: July 18, 1933 (aged 82) Quebec City, Quebec

Sir François-Xavier Lemieux (April 9, 1851 – July 18, 1933), often referred to as F.X. Lemieux, was a Quebec lawyer, judge and political figure. He represented Lévis in the Legislative Assembly of Quebec from 1883 to 1892 and Bonaventure from 1894 to 1897. Lemieux was also Louis Riel's lawyer in 1885.

He was born at Lévis in 1851 and studied at the college there, at Quebec City and the Université Laval. He articled in law, was called to the Quebec bar in 1872 and became a successful criminal lawyer. In 1874, he married Diane, the daughter of judge Marc-Aurèle Plamondon.

Lemieux was the head of Louis Riel's defence team, which included several other leading lawyers from eastern Canada, at his trial for high treason in 1885. Some believe that Riel's lawyers may not have taken advantage of available options for avoiding the death penalty. The jury returned a verdict of guilty with a recommendation for mercy, but the death penalty was mandatory under the statute. Subsequent appeals of the verdict were dismissed and Riel was executed in November 1885.

In 1892, Lemieux successfully defended Honoré Mercier against a charge of having defrauded the public treasury. Lemieux was named bâtonnier for the Quebec bar in Quebec district in 1896 and for the province in 1896 and 1897.

Lemieux had been reelected to the legislative assembly in both Lévis and Bonaventure in 1897, but resigned his seat when he was named judge in the Quebec Superior Court for Athabaska district. In 1915, he was named chief judge in the court. He was knighted in 1915.

He died at Quebec City in 1933.
