= Saint-Sauveur (electoral district) =

Former provincial electoral district in Quebec, Canada

Coordinates: 46.818°N 71.254°W

Quebec electoral district

Defunct provincial electoral district
- Legislature: National Assembly of Quebec
- District created: 1890
- District abolished: 1972
- First contested: 1890
- Last contested: 1970

Saint-Sauveur (French pronunciation: [sɛ̃ sovœʁ]) was a provincial electoral district in the Capitale-Nationale region of Quebec, Canada.

It was created for the 1890 election from part of Québec-Est electoral district. Its final election was in 1970. It disappeared in the 1973 election and its successor electoral districts were Taschereau and Vanier.

== Members of the Legislative Assembly / National Assembly ==
- Simon-Napoléon Parent, Liberal (1890–1905)
- Charles-Eugène Côté, Liberal (1905–1909)
- Joseph-Alphonse Langlois, Parti ouvrier (1909–1916)
- Arthur Paquet, Liberal (1916–1923)
- Pierre Bertrand, Parti ouvrier (1923–1927)
- Charles-Édouard Cantin, Liberal (1927–1931)
- Pierre Bertrand, Conservative Party – Union Nationale (1931–1939)
- Wilfrid Hamel, Liberal (1939–1948)
- Francis Boudreau, Union Nationale (1948–1970)
- Armand Bois, Ralliement creditiste (1970–1973)
