= 4th Quebec Legislature =

Legislature of Quebec Législature du Québec
- Fourth Legislature, 1878 - 1881

Type
- Type: Bicameral
- Houses: Legislative Council; Legislative Assembly
- Term limits: Four years, subject to earlier dissolution.

History
- Founded: July 1, 1867
- Preceded by: Third Legislature of Quebec, 1875-1878
- Succeeded by: Fifth Legislature of Quebec, 1881-1886

Leadership
- Monarch: Victoria
- Lieutenant Governor: Luc Letellier de St-Just (1876-1879); Théodore Robitaille (1879-1884)
- Premier: Henri-Gustave Joly de Lotbinière (Liberal) (1878-1879); Joseph-Adolphe Chapleau (Conservative) (1879-1882)
- Speaker of the Legislative Council: Henry Starnes (Liberal) (1878-1879); John Jones Ross (Conservative) (1879-1882)
- Speaker of the Legislative Assembly: Arthur Turcotte (Independent Conservative) (1878-1882)
- Leader of the Opposition: Joseph-Adolphe Chapleau (Conservative) (1878-1879); Henri-Gustave Joly de Lotbinière (1879-1882) Liberal

Structure
- Seats: Legislative Council: 24; Legislative Assembly: 65
- Legislative Council political groups: Conservatives 21; Liberals 2 Vacant 1
- Legislative Assembly political groups: Conservatives 32; Liberals 31; Independent Conservatives 2

Elections
- Legislative Council voting system: Life appointments
- Legislative Assembly voting system: Single member constituencies First-past-the-post voting Secret ballot Adult male franchise with property qualification

Constitution
- British North America Act, 1867

The Fourth Legislature of Quebec was the provincial legislature of Quebec, Canada that existed from 1878 to 1881, following the general election of 1878.

The 1878 election was called by Premier Henri-Gustave Joly de Lotbinière, leader of the Quebec Liberal Party, after he had been installed in office by the Lieutenant Governor Luc Letellier de St-Just. The Lieutenant Governor had dismissed the former Conservative Premier, Charles Boucher de Boucherville, over a dispute about railway legislation proposed by the Boucher de Boucherville government.

Since the Liberals did not have a majority in the Legislative Assembly, Joly de Lotbinière called an election immediately. The election resulted in a hung parliament, with neither party having a majority in the Legislative Assembly. Joly de Lotbinière was able to stay in office for one year with a minority government, supported by two Independent Conservatives, but lost a confidence vote in 1879. The Quebec Conservative Party led by Joseph-Adolphe Chapleau then formed a majority government for the remainder of the term of the legislature.

The legislature held four annual sessions, with the first session called on June 4, 1878. The legislature was dissolved on November 7, 1881, leading to the 1881 general election on December 2, 1881.

== Structure of the legislature ==
The Legislature of Quebec was created by the British North America Act, 1867. It consisted of the Lieutenant Governor of Quebec, the Legislative Assembly and the Legislative Council. The Lieutenant Governor was appointed by the Governor General of Canada for a term of five years. The Legislative Assembly consisted of sixty-five members, elected in single-member constituencies by first-past-the-post elections. The Legislative Assembly was to last for four years, subject to being dissolved earlier by the Lieutenant Governor. The Legislative Council consisted of twenty-four members, appointed for life by the Government of Quebec.

== Elections and qualifications ==
=== Right to vote ===
The right to vote in elections to the Legislative Assembly was not universal. Only male British subjects (by birth or naturalisation), aged 21 or older, were eligible to vote, and only if they met a property qualification. For residents of larger cities, the qualification was being the owner or occupant of real property assessed at three hundred dollars or more, or for tenants, an annual rent of thirty dollars or more. For any other municipality, the qualification was being an owner or occupant of real property assessed at two hundred dollars or more, or twenty dollars in annual value. For tenants in smaller centers, the qualification was paying an annual rent of twenty dollars or more.

Women were completely barred from voting.

Judges and many municipal and provincial officials were also barred from voting, particularly officials with law enforcement duties, or duties relating to public revenue. The Returning Officer in each riding was also barred from voting, except when needed to give a casting vote in the event of a tie vote.

=== Qualification for the Legislative Assembly ===
Candidates for election to the Legislative Assembly had to meet stricter qualifications than voters. In addition to being male, twenty-one or older, and a subject of Her Majesty (by birth or naturalisation), a candidate had to be free from all legal incapacity, and be the proprietor in possession of lands or tenements worth at least $2,000, over and above all encumbrances and charges on the property.

Women were completely barred from membership in the Assembly.

=== Qualification for the Legislative Council ===
The qualifications for the members of the Legislative Council were the same as for the members of the Senate of Canada. Those requirements were:

1. Be of the full age of thirty years;
2. Be a British subject, either natural-born or naturalised;
3. Possess real property in Quebec worth at least $4,000, over and above any debts or incumbrances on the property;
4. Have a net worth of at least $4,000, over and above debts and liabilities;
5. Reside in Quebec;
6. Reside in, or possess his qualifying real property, in the division he was named to represent.

The provisions of the British North America Act, 1867 did not explicitly bar women from being called to the Senate of Canada. However, until the Persons Case, it was assumed that women could not be called to the Senate, and were thus also barred from the Legislative Council. In any event, no woman was ever appointed to the Legislative Council.

== Events of the Fourth Legislature ==
The initial lack of a clear majority in the Legislative Assembly for either party led to political instability for the first eighteen months of the term of the Fourth Legislature. The Liberal government of Premier Joly de Lotbinière depended on the support of the two Independent Conservatives. The Liberals agreed to elect one of the two independents, Arthur Turcotte, as Speaker of the Assembly, a highly coveted position. Given the narrow majority and factiousness within the Liberal caucus itself, Joly de Lotbinière's government was uncertain of support from vote to vote in the Assembly, which affected his ability to implement major legislation. Several times, his government only stayed in office by a vote from Turcotte as Speaker. Joly de Lotbinière's government was also supported from time to time by William Evan Price, who was nominally a Conservative but often voted in support of the government.

On the Conservative side, the former house leader of the party in the Legislative Assembly, Auguste-Réal Angers, lost his seat in the general election. This event badly weakened the authority of the leader of the party, former premier Boucher de Boucherville, who sat in the unelected Legislative Council. He was forced to cede the leadership of the party to Joseph-Adolphe Chapleau, who became the Leader of the Opposition.

The next event was the dismissal of Lieutenant Governor Luc Letellier de Saint-Just by the new federal Conservative government of Sir John A. Macdonald. Conservatives in Quebec, led by Chapleau, had been pressuring Macdonald to dismiss Letellier de Saint-Just as soon as the Macdonald government had defeated Alexander Mackenzie's Liberal government in the 1878 federal election. Macdonald replaced Letellier de Saint-Just with an equally partisan Conservative, Théodore Robitaille.

By the fall of 1879, Joly de Lotbinère's government was badly weakened. A proposal to abolish the Legislative Council as an austerity measure resulted in a revolt in the Legislative Council. Urged by Chapleau, the Council refused to pass the provincial budget. Chapleau attracted the support of five Liberal members of the Legislative Assembly, who crossed the floor and joined the Conservatives, giving Chapleau a majority in the Assembly. On October 29, 1879, the Assembly passed a motion calling for a coalition government, essentially a motion of non-confidence, by a vote of 35 to 29. Joly de Lotbinière was confident that he could win an election on the issues. He advised the new lieutenant governor, Robitaille, to dissolve the Assembly and call a general election. On October 30, 1879, Robitaille refused the dissolution. Joly de Lotbinière resigned and the Lieutenant Governor called on Chapleau to form a government. The Chapleau government was sworn in on October 31, 1878. Since he now had a working majority, Chapleau did not call an election, instead leading the Conservative government for the remaining term of the legislature. Like the Conservatives the previous year, the Liberals accused the Lieutenant Governor of performing a coup d'état.

== Legislative Assembly ==
=== Party standings ===
The 1878 election returned a hung parliament. Neither party initially had a majority in the Legislative Assembly. The Conservatives had one seat more than the Liberals, but there were also two independent Conservatives. With their support, Premier Joly de Lotbinière was initially able to stay in office.

Affiliation	Members
Conservative Party	32
Liberal Party	31
Independent Conservative	2
Total	65
Liberal Majority	1

=== Members of the Legislative Assembly ===
The following candidates were elected to the Legislative Assembly in the 1878 election. The Premiers of Quebec are indicated by Bold italics. The Speaker of the Legislative Assembly is indicated by small caps. Cabinet Ministers are indicated by Italics.

Name	Party	Riding	First elected / previously elected	No. of terms
Robert Greenshields Meikle	Liberal	Argenteuil	1878	1st term
Narcisse Blais	Liberal	Bagot	1878	1st term
Joseph Poirier	Liberal	Beauce	1878	1st term
Célestin Bergevin	Conservative	Beauharnois	1867, 1878	2nd term*
Pierre Boutin	Liberal	Bellechasse	1878	1st term
Joseph Robillard (Note: Election annulled, November 30, 1880.)	Conservative	Berthier	1878	1st term
Joseph-Israël Tarte	Conservative	Bonaventure	1877	2nd term
William Warren Lynch (Note: Appointed to Cabinet on October 31, 1879, triggering a ministerial by-election.)	Conservative	Brome	1871	3rd term
Michel-Dosithée-Stanislas Martel (Note: Election annulled, April 30, 1879.)	Conservative	Chambly	1878	1st term
Raymond Préfontaine (1879)	Liberal	Chambly	1875, 1879	2nd term*
Dominique-Napoléon Saint-Cyr	Conservative	Champlain	1875	2nd term
Onésime Gauthier	Conservative	Charlevoix	1875	2nd term
Édouard Laberge	Liberal	Châteauguay	1867	4th term
William Evan Price (Note: Resigned due to ill-health, February 13, 1880.)	Independent Conservative	Chicoutimi et Saguenay	1875	2nd term
Joseph-Élisée Beaudet (1880)	Conservative	Chicoutimi et Saguenay	1880	1st term
Willian Sawyer	Conservative	Compton	1871	3rd term
Charles Champagne	Conservative	Deux-Montagnes	1876	2nd term
Nicodème Audet	Conservative	Dorchester	1878	1st term
William John Watts	Liberal (Note: First elected as an Independent Conservative)	Drummond et Arthabaska	1874	3rd term
Edmund James Flynn (Note: Elected as a Liberal in the general election of 1878. One of five Liberals who crossed the floor to the Conservatives, bringing down the Liberal government, October 29, 1879. Appointed to Cabinet on October 31, 1879, triggering a ministerial by-election.)	Liberal 1878–1879	Gaspé	1878	1st term
Edmund James Flynn	Conservative 1879–1881	Gaspé	1878	1st term
Louis Beaubien	Conservative	Hochelaga	1867	4th term
Alexander Cameron	Liberal	Huntingdon	1874	3rd term
Louis Molleur	Liberal	Iberville	1867	4th term
Jean-Baptiste Couillard Dupuis	Liberal	Islet	1878	1st term
Narcisse Lecavalier	Conservative	Jacques Cartier	1867	4th term
Vincent-Paul Lavallée	Conservative	Joliette	1867	4th term
Charles-Antoine-Ernest Gagnon	Liberal	Kamouraska	1878	1st term
Léon-Benoît-Alfred Charlebois	Conservative	Laprairie	1875	2nd term
Onuphe Peltier (Note: Died in office, May 10, 1880.)	Conservative	L'Assomption	1871	3rd term
Joseph Marion (1880)	Conservative	L'Assomption	1880	1st term
Louis-Onésime Loranger	Conservative	Laval	1875	2nd term
Étienne-Théodore Pâquet	Liberal 1878-1879 (Note: First elected as a Conservative)	Lévis	1875	2nd term
Étienne-Théodore Pâquet	Conservative 1879–1881	Lévis	1875	2nd term
Henri-Gustave Joly de Lotbinière	Liberal	Lotbinière	1867	4th term
Édouard Caron	Conservative	Maskinongé	1878	1st term
George Irvine	Liberal	Mégantic	1867, 1878	4th term*
Ernest Racicot (Note: Elected as a Liberal in the general election of 1878. One of five Liberals who crossed the floor to the Conservatives, bringing down the Liberal government, October 29, 1879.)	Liberal 1878–1879	Missisquoi	1878	1st term
Ernest Racicot	Conservative 1879–1881	Missisquoi	1878	1st term
Octave Magnan	Conservative	Montcalm	1878	1st term
Louis-Napoléon Fortin	Liberal 1878-1878	Montmagny	1876	2nd term
Louis-Napoléon Fortin	Conservative 1879–1881	Montmagny	1876	2nd term
Charles Langelier	Liberal	Montmorency	1878	1st term
Horatio Admiral Nelson	Liberal	Montréal Centre	1878	1st term
Louis-Olivier Taillon	Conservative	Montréal Est	1875	2nd term
James McShane	Liberal	Montreal Ouest	1878	1st term
Laurent-David Lafontaine	Liberal	Napierville	1870	4th term
Charles-Édouard Houde	Conservative	Nicolet	1876	2nd term
Louis Duhamel	Conservative	Ottawa	1875	2nd term
Levi Ruggles Church	Conservative	Pontiac	1867, (Note: Ottawa) 1874	4th term*
François Langelier	Liberal	Portneuf	1873, (Note: Montmagny) 1878	2nd term*
David Alexander Ross	Liberal	Québec-Comté	1878	1st term
Rémi-Ferdinand Rinfret dit Malouin	Liberal	Québec-Centre	1874	3rd term
Joseph Shehyn	Liberal	Québec-Est	1875	2nd term
Arthur H. Murphy	Liberal	Québec-Ouest	1878	1st term
Michel Mathieu	Conservative	Richelieu	1875	2nd term
Jacques Picard	Conservative	Richmond et Wolfe	1867	4th term
Alexandre Chauveau (Note: Elected as a Liberal in the general election of 1878. One of five Liberals who crossed the floor to the Conservatives, bringing down the Liberal government, October 29, 1879. Resigned seat on being appointed judge of the Sessions of the Peace, January 16, 1880.)	Liberal 1878-1879	Rimouski	1872	3rd term
Alexandre Chauveau	Conservative 1879–1880	Rimouski	1872	3rd term
Joseph Parent (1880)	Liberal	Rimouski	1880	1st term
Solime Bertrand (Note: Election annulled, May 21, 1879.)	Conservative	Rouville	1878	1st term
Flavien-Guillaume Bouthillier (1879)	Liberal	Rouville	1879	1st term
Pierre Bachand (Note: Died in office, November 3, 1878.)	Liberal	Saint-Hyacinthe	1867	4th term
Honoré Mercier (1879)	Liberal	Saint-Hyacinthe	1879	1st term
Félix-Gabriel Marchand	Liberal	St. Jean	1867	4th term
François-Sévère Desaulniers	Conservative	St. Maurice	1878	1st term
Joseph Lafontaine	Liberal	Shefford	1878	1st term
Joseph Gibb Robertson	Conservative	Sherbrooke	1867	4th term
William Duckett	Conservative	Soulanges	1878	1st term
Henry Lovell	Liberal	Stanstead	1878	1st term
Georges-Honoré Deschênes	Conservative	Témiscouata	1875	2nd term
Joseph-Adolphe Chapleau (Note: Appointed Premier of Quebec on October 31, 1879, triggering a ministerial by-election.)	Conservative	Terrebonne	1867	4th term
Henri-René-Arthur Turcotte	Independent Conservative	Trois-Rivières	1876	2nd term
Émery Lalonde, Sr.	Conservative	Vaudreuil	1871	3rd term
Jean-Baptiste Brousseau (Note: Election annulled by the Superior Court, June 8, 1878.)	Liberal	Verchères	1878	1st term
Achille Larose (1879)	Liberal	Verchères	1879	1st term
Jonathan Saxton Campbell Würtele	Conservative	Yamaska	1875	2nd term

=== By-elections ===
There were fourteen by-elections during the term of the Fourth Legislature. Premier of Quebec is indicated by bold italics. Cabinet ministers are indicated by italics.

By-elections, 1879–1880
Name	Party	Riding	Reason for Vacancy	By-election Date
Honoré Mercier	Liberal	Saint-Hyacinthe	Incumbent died in office.	June 3, 1879
Flavien-Guillaume Bouthillier	Liberal	Rouville	Election of incumbent annulled.	June 18, 1879
Raymond Préfontaine	Liberal	Chambly	Election of incumbent annulled.	June 26, 1879
Achille Larose	Liberal	Verchères	Election of incumbent annulled.	July 17, 1879
Joseph-Adolphe Chapleau	Conservative	Terrebonne	Appointed Premier of Quebec, triggering a ministerial by-election. Re-elected by acclamation.	November 13, 1879
Louis-Onésime Loranger	Conservative	Laval	Appointed to Cabinet, triggering a ministerial by-election. Re-elected by acclamation.	November 13, 1879
William Warren Lynch	Conservative	Brome	Appointed to Cabinet on October 31, 1879, triggering a ministerial by-election.	November 20, 1879
Étienne-Théodore Pâquet	Conservative	Lévis	Appointed to Cabinet on October 31, 1879, triggering a ministerial by-election.	November 20, 1879
Joseph Gibb Robertson	Conservative	Sherbrooke	Appointed to Cabinet on October 31, 1879, triggering a ministerial by-election. Re-elected by acclamation.	November 20, 1879
Edmund James Flynn	Conservative	Gaspé	Appointed to Cabinet on October 31, 1879, triggering a ministerial by-election. Re-elected by acclamation.	December 6, 1879
Joseph Parent	Liberal	Rimouski	Incumbent appointed to the Sessions of the Peace	March 3, 1880
Joseph-Élisée Beaudet	Conservative	Chicoutimi-Saguenay	Incumbent resigned due to ill health.	March 27, 1880
Joseph Marion	Conservative	L'Assomption	Incumbent died in office.	June 4, 1880
Joseph Robillard	Conservative	Berthier	Election in the general election annulled.	December 30, 1880

== Legislative Council ==
=== Party standings ===
The Conservatives had a strong majority in the Legislative Council throughout the Fourth Legislature.

Standings at First Session, 1878
Party	Members
Conservatives	21
Liberals	3
Total:	24
Conservative Majority:	18

=== Members during the Fourth Legislature ===
The Speakers of the Legislative Council are indicated by small caps. Cabinet members are indicated by italics.

Members 1878–1881
Legislative Council Divisions	Member	Party	Term Start	Term End
Alma	Beaudry, Jean-Louis	Conservative	November 2, 1867	June 25, 1886
Bedford	Wood, Thomas	Conservative	November 2, 1867	November 13, 1898
De la Durantaye	Rémillard, Édouard	Liberal	May 27, 1878	January 31, 1887
De la Vallière	Proulx, Jean-Baptiste-Georges	Liberal	November 2, 1867	January 27, 1884
De Lanaudière	Dostaler, Pierre-Eustache	Conservative	November 2, 1867	January 4, 1884
De Lorimier	Laviolette, Joseph-Gaspard	Conservative	May 1, 1876	March 11, 1897
De Salaberry	Starnes, Henry	Liberal	November 2, 1867	March 3, 1896
Grandville	Dionne, Élisée	Conservative	November 2, 1867	August 22, 1892
Gulf	Savage, Thomas	Conservative	November 19, 1873	February 27, 1887
Inkerman	Bryson, George (Sr.)	Conservative	November 2, 1867	January 13, 1900
Kennebec	Gaudet, Joseph	Conservative	October 30, 1877	August 4, 1882
La Salle	Panet, Louis	Conservative	November 2, 1867	May 15, 1884
Lauzon	Chaussegros de Léry, Alexandre-René	Conservative	November 2, 1867	December 19, 1880
Mille-Isles	Lemaire, Félix-Hyacinthe†	Conservative	November 2, 1867	December 17, 1879
Mille-Isles	Vacant		December 18, 1879	June 2, 1880
Mille-Isles	Jean-Baptiste Lefebvre de Villemure	Conservative	June 3, 1880	March 4, 1882
Montarville	Boucher de Boucherville, Charles-Eugène	Conservative	November 2, 1867	September 10, 1915
Repentigny	Archambeault, Louis	Conservative	November 2, 1867	June 6, 1888
Rigaud	Prud'homme, Eustache	Conservative	November 2, 1867	April 28, 1888
Rougemont	Boucher de la Bruère, Pierre	Conservative	October 30, 1877	April 5, 1895
Saurel	Roy, Pierre-Euclide	Conservative	November 19, 1873	October 31, 1882
Shawinigan	Ross, John Jones	Conservative	November 2, 1867	May 4, 1901
Stadacona	Hearn, John	Conservative	October 30, 1877	February 19, 1892
The Laurentides	Gingras, Jean-Élie	Conservative	November 2, 1867	December 10, 1887
Victoria	Ferrier, James	Conservative	November 2, 1867	May 30, 1888
Wellington	Webb, William Hoste	Conservative	October 7, 1875	March 11, 1887

Vacancies of less than one month are not shown.
† Died in office.

== Executive Council during the Fourth Legislature ==
There were two different ministries during the term of the Fourth Legislature, under Premiers Joly de Lotbinière (1878–1879) and Chapleau (1879–1881).

=== Fourth Quebec Ministry: Joly de Lotbinière Cabinet (1878 - 1879) ===
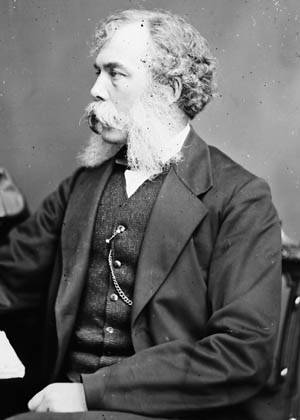
Henri-Gustave Joly de Lotbinière, Fourth Premier of Quebec

Following the election of 1878, Joly de Lotbinière retained much of his Cabinet in the new Legislature, but carried out a Cabinet shuffle the next year, in 1879. In 1879, Joly de Lotbinière appointed Honoré Mercier to cabinet, even though Mercier did not initially have a seat in the Legislative Assembly. The resignation of Alexandre Chauveau on September 12, 1879, marked the beginning of the dissolution of the Joly de Lotbinière government. Chauveau would join the Conservatives a month later, along with four other Liberals who crossed the floor and voted to defeat the government on October 29, 1879. When the Lieutenant Governor refused a dissolution, the government resigned on October 30, 1879. The Chapleau government was sworn in the next day.

Members of the Executive Council: 1878–1879
Position	Minister	Term start	Term end
Premier and President of the Executive Council	Henri-Gustave Joly de Lotbinière	1878	1879
Agriculture and Public Works	Henri-Gustave Joly de Lotbinière	1878	1879
Attorney General	David Alexander Ross	1878	1879
Crown lands	François Langelier	1878	1879
Crown lands	Félix-Gabriel Marchand	1879	
Secretary and Registrar	Félix-Gabriel Marchand	1878	1879
Secretary and Registrar	Alexandre Chauveau	1879	
Solicitor General	Alexandre Chauveau	1878	1879
Solicitor General	Honoré Mercier**	1879	
Speaker of the Legislative Council	Henry Starnes*	1878	1879
Treasurer	Pierre Bachand	1878	1879
Treasurer	François Langelier	1879	
* Member of the Legislative Council; **Appointed minister without seat in the Legislature

=== Fifth Quebec Ministry: Chapleau Cabinet (1879-1882) ===
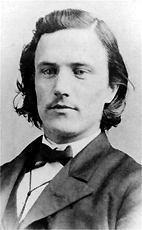
Joseph-Adolphe Chapleau, Fifth Premier of Quebec

Following the defeat of the Joly de Lotbinière government on a confidence vote on October 29, 1879, the Chapleau government was sworn in on October 31, 1879.

Members of the Executive Council: 1878–1879
Position	Minister	Term start	Term end
Premier and President of the Executive Council	Joseph-Adolphe Chapleau	1879	1882
Agriculture and Public Works	Joseph-Adolphe Chapleau	1879	1881
Agriculture and Public Works	John Jones Ross*	1881	1882
Agriculture and Public Works	Élisée Dionne*	1882	
Attorney General	Louis-Onesime Loranger	1879	1882
Crown lands	Edmund James Flynn	1879	1882
Railways	Joseph-Adolphe Chapleau	1881	
Railways	John Jones Ross*	1881	1882
Railways	William Warren Lynch	1882	
Secretary and Registrar	Étienne-Théodore Pâquet	1879	1882
Solicitor General	William Warren Lynch	1879	1882
Treasurer	Joseph Gibb Robertson	1879	1882
Treasurer	Jonathan Saxton Campbell Würfele	1882	
Speaker of the Legislative Council	John Jones Ross*	1879	1882
Speaker of the Legislative Council	Pierre Boucher de la Bruère	align=center|1882	
* Member of the Legislative Council

== Leaders of the Opposition ==
There were two leaders of the Opposition during the Fourth Legislature. Joseph-Adolphe Chapleau was leader for the first eighteen months of the legislature, from May 1878 to October 1879. When Premier Joly de Lotbinière resigned and was replaced by Chapelau, Joly de Lotbinière became leader of the Opposition for the remainder of the term of the legislature, to 1882.

== Legislative sessions ==
The legislature had four annual sessions:

- First session: June 4, 1878 to July 20, 1878, with thirty-six sitting days.
- Second session: June 19, 1879 to October 31, 1879, with fifty-seven sitting days.
- Third session: May 28, 1880 to July 24, 1880, with thirty-nine sitting days.
- Fourth session: April 28, 1881 to June 30, 1881, with forty-five sitting days.

The legislature was dissolved on November 7, 1881.
