= List of premiers of Quebec =

This is a list of the premiers of the province of Quebec since Canadian Confederation in 1867. Quebec uses a unicameral (originally bicameral) Westminster-style parliamentary government, in which the premier is the leader of the party that controls the most seats in the National Assembly (previously called the Legislative Assembly). The premier is Quebec's head of government, while the king of Canada is its head of state and is represented by the lieutenant governor of Quebec. The premier picks a cabinet from the elected members to form the Executive Council of Quebec, and presides over that body.

Members are first elected to the legislature during general elections. General elections must be conducted every four years from the date of the last election, but the premier may ask for early dissolution of the legislative assembly. An election may also happen if the Governing party loses the confidence of the legislature, by the defeat of a supply bill or tabling of a confidence motion.

This article only covers the time since the Canadian Confederation was created in 1867. For the premiers of the Canada East from 1840 to 1867, see List of joint premiers of the Province of Canada. The governments of Lower Canada from 1792 to 1840 were mostly controlled by representatives of the Crown.

== Premiers of Quebec since 1867 ==
No.	Portrait	Name (Birth–Death)	Term of office	Electoral mandates (Assembly)	Political party	Parliamentary seat
1		Pierre-Joseph-Olivier Chauveau (1820–1890)	15 July 1867 – 25 February 1873	Title created (caretaker government) 1867 election (1st Leg.) 1871 election (2nd Leg.)	Conservative	MLA for Québec-Comté
1		Pierre-Joseph-Olivier Chauveau (1820–1890)	Resigned to accept appointment to the Senate of Canada.			
2		Gédéon Ouimet (1823–1905)	27 February 1873 – 22 September 1874	Appointment (2nd Leg.)	Conservative	MLA for Deux-Montagnes
2		Gédéon Ouimet (1823–1905)	Resigned over Tanneries scandal.			
3 (1 of 2)		Charles Boucher de Boucherville (1822–1915)	22 September 1874 – 8 March 1878	Appointment (2nd Leg.) 1875 election (3rd Leg.)	Conservative	Councillor for Montarville
3 (1 of 2)		Charles Boucher de Boucherville (1822–1915)	Dismissed by Lieutenant Governor Luc Letellier de St-Just after Letellier refused to approve legislation.			
4		Henri-Gustave Joly de Lotbinière (1829–1908)	8 March 1878 – 31 October 1879	Appointment (3rd Leg.) 1878 election (4th Leg.)	Liberal	MLA for Lotbinière
5		Joseph-Adolphe Chapleau (1840–1898)	31 October 1879 – 31 July 1882	Appointment (4th Leg.) 1881 election (5th Leg.)	Conservative	MLA for Terrebonne
6		Joseph-Alfred Mousseau (1837–1886)	31 July 1882 – 23 January 1884	Appointment (5th Leg.)	Conservative	MLA for Jacques-Cartier
7		John Jones Ross (1831–1901)	23 January 1884 – 25 January 1887	Appointment (5th Leg.) 1886 election (6th Leg.)	Conservative	Councillor for Shawinigan
8 (1 of 2)		Louis-Olivier Taillon (1840–1923)	25 January 1887 – 29 January 1887	Appointment (6th Leg.)	Conservative	MLA for Montcalm
9		Honoré Mercier (1840–1894)	29 January 1887 – 21 December 1891	Appointment (6th Leg.) 1890 election (7th Leg.)	Parti National	MLA for Saint-Hyacinthe (1887-1890) MLA for Bonaventure (1890-1891)
9		Honoré Mercier (1840–1894)	Dismissed by Lieutenant Governor over charges of corruption.			
— (2 of 2)		Charles Boucher de Boucherville (1822–1915)	21 December 1891 – 16 December 1892	Appointment (7th Leg.) 1892 election (8th Leg.)	Conservative	Councillor for Montarville
— (2 of 2)		Louis-Olivier Taillon (1840–1923)	16 December 1892 – 11 May 1896	Appointment (8th Leg.)	Conservative	MLA for Chambly
10		Edmund James Flynn (1847–1927)	12 May 1896 – 24 May 1897	Appointment (8th Leg.)	Conservative	MLA for Gaspé
10		Edmund James Flynn (1847–1927)	Last Conservative premier.			
11		Félix-Gabriel Marchand (1832–1900)	24 May 1897 – 25 September 1900	1897 election (9th Leg.)	Liberal	MLA for Saint-Jean
11		Félix-Gabriel Marchand (1832–1900)	Died in office.			
12		Simon-Napoléon Parent (1855–1920)	3 October 1900 – 23 March 1905	Appointment (9th Leg.) 1900 election (10th Leg.) 1904 election (11th Leg.)	Liberal	MLA for Saint-Sauveur
13		Lomer Gouin (1861–1929)	23 March 1905 – 23 March 1920	Appointment (11th Leg.) 1908 election (12th Leg.) 1912 election (13th Leg.) 1916 election (14th Leg.) 1919 election (15th Leg.)	Liberal	MLA for Montréal division no. 2 (1905-1908) MLA for Portneuf (1908-1920)
14		Louis-Alexandre Taschereau (1867–1952)	9 July 1920 – 11 June 1936	Appointment (15th Leg.) 1923 election (16th Leg.) 1927 election (17th Leg.) 1931 election (18th Leg.) 1935 election (19th Leg.)	Liberal	MLA for Montmorency
14		Louis-Alexandre Taschereau (1867–1952)	Established Quebec Liquor Commission; attempted to create a Jewish school board; Great Depression.			
15 (1 of 2)		Adélard Godbout (1892–1956)	11 June 1936 – 26 August 1936	Appointment (19th Leg.)	Liberal (Ldr. 1938)	MLA for L'Islet
16 (1 of 2)		Maurice Duplessis (1890–1959)	26 August 1936 – 8 November 1939	1936 election (20th Leg.)	Union Nationale (Ldr. 1936)	MLA for Trois-Rivières
16 (1 of 2)		Maurice Duplessis (1890–1959)	Padlock Law.			
— (2 of 2)		Adélard Godbout (1892–1956)	8 November 1939 – 30 August 1944	1939 election (21st Leg.)	Liberal (Ldr. 1938)	MLA for L'Islet
— (2 of 2)		Adélard Godbout (1892–1956)	Women's suffrage; established province's first labour code; nationalized Montreal Light, Heat & Power.			
— (2 of 2)		Maurice Duplessis (1890–1959)	30 August 1944 – 7 September 1959	1944 election (22nd Leg.) 1948 election (23rd Leg.) 1952 election (24th Leg.) 1956 election (25th Leg.)	Union Nationale (Ldr. 1936)	MLA for Trois-Rivières
— (2 of 2)		Maurice Duplessis (1890–1959)	"Grande Noirceur", Duplessis Orphans. Died in office.			
17		Paul Sauvé (1907–1960)	11 September 1959 – 2 January 1960	Appointment (25th Leg.)	Union Nationale (Ldr. 1959)	MLA for Deux-Montagnes
17		Paul Sauvé (1907–1960)	"100 Days of Change". Died in office.			
18		Antonio Barrette (1899–1968)	8 January 1960 – 5 July 1960	Appointment (25th Leg.)	Union Nationale (Ldr. 1960)	MLA for Joliette
19		Jean Lesage (1912–1980)	5 July 1960 – 16 June 1966	1960 election (26th Leg.) 1962 election (27th Leg.)	Liberal (Ldr. 1958)	MLA for Québec-Ouest
19		Jean Lesage (1912–1980)	Quiet Revolution; established Ministry of Education; heavy investment in Hydro-Québec;			
20		Daniel Johnson Sr. (1915–1968)	16 June 1966 – 26 September 1968	1966 election (28th Leg.)	Union Nationale (Ldr. 1961)	MLA for Bagot
20		Daniel Johnson Sr. (1915–1968)	CEGEP; died in office.			
21		Jean-Jacques Bertrand (1916–1973)	2 October 1968 – 12 May 1970	Appointment (28th Leg.)	Union Nationale (Ldr. 1969)	MLA for Missisquoi (MNA after 1968)
21		Jean-Jacques Bertrand (1916–1973)	Abolished the Legislative Council and renamed the Legislative Assembly to the National Assembly; Bill 63; last Union Nationale premier.			
22 (1 of 2)		Robert Bourassa (1933–1996)	29 April 1970 – 25 November 1976	1970 election (29th Leg.) 1973 election (30th Leg.)	Liberal (Ldr. 1970)	MNA for Mercier
22 (1 of 2)		Robert Bourassa (1933–1996)	October Crisis; Official Languages Act (Bill 22); James Bay and Northern Quebec Agreement; Cliche commission.			
23		René Lévesque (1922–1987)	25 November 1976 – 3 October 1985	1976 election (31st Leg.) 1981 election (32nd Leg.)	Parti Québécois (Ldr. 1968)	MNA for Taillon
23		René Lévesque (1922–1987)	Charter of the French Language (Bill 101); 1980 Quebec referendum; Patriation of the Canadian constitution discussions; beau risque.			
24		Pierre Marc Johnson (b. 1946)	3 October 1985 – 12 December 1985	Appointment (32nd Leg.)	Parti Québécois (Ldr. 1985)	MNA for Anjou
— (2 of 2)		Robert Bourassa (1933–1996)	12 December 1985 – 11 January 1994	1985 election (33rd Leg.) 1989 election (34th Leg.)	Liberal (Ldr. 1983)	MNA for Saint-Laurent
— (2 of 2)		Robert Bourassa (1933–1996)	Meech Lake Accord; Oka Crisis; Charlottetown Accord.			
25		Daniel Johnson Jr. (b. 1944)	11 January 1994 – 26 September 1994	Appointment (34th Leg.)	Liberal (Ldr. 1993)	MNA for Vaudreuil
25		Daniel Johnson Jr. (b. 1944)	Privatisation of the Mont-Sainte-Anne			
26		Jacques Parizeau (1930–2015)	26 September 1994 – 29 January 1996	1994 election (35th Leg.)	Parti Québécois (Ldr. 1988)	MNA for L'Assomption
26		Jacques Parizeau (1930–2015)	Creation of the Commission de la capitale nationale du Québec; Creation of the Carrefour jeunesse-emploi network; 1995 Quebec referendum; resigned after referendum loss.			
27		Lucien Bouchard (b. 1938)	29 January 1996 – 8 March 2001	Appointment (35th Leg.) 1998 election (36th Leg.)	Parti Québécois (Ldr. 1996)	MNA for Jonquière
27		Lucien Bouchard (b. 1938)	"Winning conditions"; implemented universal childcare and pharmacare; Establishment of the Public Prescription Drug Insurance Plan (RPAM); Saguenay flood; Creation of the Régie de l'énergie; Creation of the Épargne Placements Québec; Calgary Declaration; January 1998 North American ice storm; Clarity Act; 2000–2006 municipal reorganization.			
28		Bernard Landry (1937–2018)	8 March 2001 – 29 April 2003	Appointment (36th Leg.)	Parti Québécois (Ldr. 2001)	MNA for Verchères
28		Bernard Landry (1937–2018)	Paix des Braves; Kyoto Protocol.			
29		Jean Charest (b. 1958)	29 April 2003 – 19 September 2012	2003 election (37th Leg.) 2007 election (38th Leg.) 2008 election (39th Leg.)	Liberal (Ldr. 1998)	MNA for Sherbrooke
29		Jean Charest (b. 1958)	2004 Quebec municipal referendums; Council of the Federation; 2005 Quebec student protests; Bouchard-Taylor Commission; Implementation of the Ethics and Religious Culture program; Plan Nord; Charbonneau Commission; 2012 Quebec student protests, lost his own seat in 2012.			
30		Pauline Marois (b. 1949)	19 September 2012 – 23 April 2014	2012 election (40th Leg.)	Parti Québécois (Ldr. 2007)	MNA for Charlevoix–Côte-de-Beaupré
30		Pauline Marois (b. 1949)	First woman to hold the office; 2012 Quebec election shooting; Quebec Charter of Values (Bill 60); Decommissioning of the Gentilly Nuclear Generating Station; Lac-Mégantic rail disaster; Summit on Higher Education; Pastagate incident; Lost her own seat in 2014.			
31		Philippe Couillard (b. 1957)	23 April 2014 – 18 October 2018	2014 election (41st Leg.)	Liberal (Ldr. 2013)	MNA for Roberval
31		Philippe Couillard (b. 1957)	Ban on face coverings (Bill 62); Healthcare Reforms (Barrette Reforms).			
32		François Legault (b. 1957)	18 October 2018 – 15 April 2026	2018 election (42nd Leg.) 2022 election (43rd Leg.)	Coalition Avenir Québec (Ldr. 2011)	MNA for L'Assomption
32		François Legault (b. 1957)	Ban on religious symbols (Bill 21); Québec‑Lévis third link; Creation of a battery sector; COVID-19 pandemic; Implementing School service centre; Amendment to the Charter of the French Language (Bill 96); Cancelled electoral reform referendum; Implementation of the Culture and Citizenship in Québec (CCQ) program; Drainville Reforms (Bill 23); Family reunification delays; Roxham Road closure; Santé Québec; Gallant Commission; Reform of PEQ immigration program; Québec Constitution Act (Bill 1).			
33		Christine Fréchette (b. 1970)	15 April 2026 – 21 October 2026	Appointment (43rd Leg.)	Coalition Avenir Québec (Ldr. 2026)	MNA for Sanguinet
33		Christine Fréchette (b. 1970)	First Generation X premier of the province; renewal of the notwithstanding clause protections around Bill 96. Lost her own seat in 2026.			
34		Paul St-Pierre Plamondon (b. 1977)	21 October 2026 – incumbent	2026 election (44th Leg.)	Parti Québécois (Ldr. 2020)	MNA for Camille-Laurin

== See also ==
- Timeline of Quebec history
- List of deputy premiers of Quebec
- List of leaders of the Official Opposition of Quebec
- List of third party leaders (Quebec)
- List of premiers of Quebec by time in office

For more lists of this type, see Lists of incumbents.
