= 1878 Quebec general election =

Canadian provincial election

- May 1, 1878

65 seats in the 4th Legislative Assembly of Quebec 33 seats needed for a majority
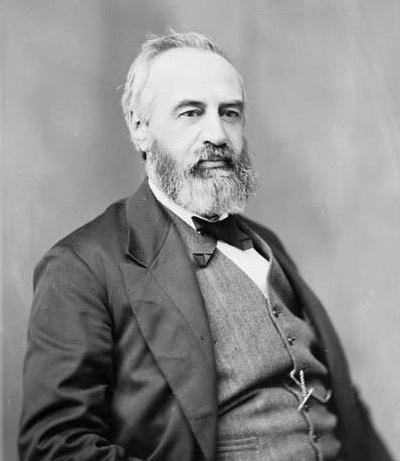

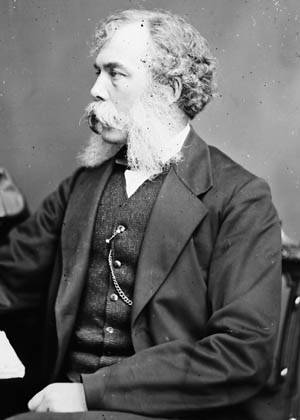
	First party	Second party
Leader	Charles Boucher de Boucherville	Henri-Gustave Joly de Lotbinière
Party	Conservative	Liberal
Leader since	1874	1869
Leader's seat	Montarville Division, Legislative Council	Lotbinière, Legislative Assembly
Last election	43 seats 51.0% popular vote	19 seats 38.0% popular vote
Seats won	32	31
Seat change	▼11	▲12
Popular vote	68,035	65,285
Percentage	49.5%	47.5%
Swing	▼1.5%	▲9.5%
- Map of the results by riding.
Premier before election
Henri-Gustave Joly de Lotbinière
Liberal Party of Quebec
Premier after election
Henri-Gustave Joly de Lotbinière
Liberal Party of Quebec

The 1878 Quebec general election was held on May 1, 1878 to elect members of the 4th Legislative Assembly for the Province of Quebec, Canada. The result was a hung parliament, with no party having a clear majority. Only one seat divided the two major parties, the Quebec Conservative Party and the Quebec Liberal Party. The balance of power was held by two Independent Conservatives.

The incumbent premier, Henri-Gustave Joly de Lotbinière, was able to form a minority government with the support of the Independent Conservatives, even though the Conservative Party had one seat more than the Liberals.

== Political events ==
The election was called in unusual circumstances. On March 8, 1878, the Lieutenant Governor of Quebec, Luc Letellier de Saint-Just, dismissed the Conservative premier, Charles Boucher de Boucherville, in a dispute over proposed railway legislation. The Lieutenant Governor then appointed Joly de Lotbinière, the leader of the Liberals, as premier. Since the Conservatives still maintained a substantial majority in the Legislative Assembly, on March 22, 1878 Joly de Lotbinière requested the dissolution of the Assembly and a general election, which Letellier de Saint-Just ordered.

The election was fought in part over economic issues and in part over the actions of the Lieutenant Governor, who was criticised by the Conservatives for having installed Joly de Lotbinière by a coup d'état. One of the leading Conservatives, Joseph-Adolphe Chapleau, opened his campaign with the slogan: "Silence the voice of Spencer Wood [the residence of the Lieutenant Governor] and let the mighty voice of the people speak." Joly de Lotbinière agreed that the people should decide, and campaigned on the slogan “The province must choose between direct taxation and economy.”

Following the election results, Joly de Lotbinière was able to stay in office for one year as the leader of a minority government supported by the Independent Conservatives, even though the Conservative Party had one more seat than the Liberals. In 1879, he was defeated in the Assembly by the Conservatives, who formed a minority government.

== Electoral map ==
The Legislative Assembly was composed of sixty-five single-member constituencies or "ridings". The 1878 election was conducted under the pre-Confederation electoral map of the former Province of Canada. That map had set the boundaries for the sixty-five constituencies of Canada East, which became Quebec. The British North America Act, 1867 provided that the pre-Confederation electoral map would continue to be used for Quebec elections until altered by the Legislature of Quebec. The map of the sixty-five constituencies was also to be used in federal elections, until altered by Parliament.

== Conduct of the election ==
=== Secret ballot ===
The election was conducted under The Quebec Election Act, a provincial statute. It was the second election where the secret ballot was used in Quebec.

=== Preparation of voter lists ===
The Act required that each municipality prepare a voter list in March of each year, based on the valuation of property and ownership used for the tax rolls. The list was drawn up the secretary-treasurer of each municipality. The municipal council then reviewed the list and could make corrections to it. Once approved by the municipal council, the list was in force until the preparation of the list in the next year. Any person who was dissatisfied by their inclusion or exclusion from the list could appeal to the local judge of the superior court or district magistrate, whose decision on the issue was final.

=== Procedure for the election ===
The election began with a proclamation issued by the Lieutenant Governor of Quebec, setting the date for nomination of candidates. The date was the same for all constituencies. The provincial Clerk of the Crown in Chancery then issued sixty-five writs, directed to the returning officer for each constituency, directing them to conduct the election. The Returning Officer would be the registrar or sheriff of the constituency.

On the date set for nominations, the Returning Officer would hold a public meeting to receive nominations. The meeting was conducted at the most central and convenient location in the constituency, in a court house, city hall or registry office, between noon and one o'clock.

To be nominated, a candidate had to file a nomination paper with the Returning Officer, signed by at least twenty-five supporters eligible to vote in the constituency, and accompanied with a deposit of $200. The nomination paper and deposit had to be filed on or before the nomination meeting.

If only one nomination was received, the Returning Officer would declare that person to be elected, and immediately report the result to the Clerk of the Crown in Chancery with the return of the writ. If two or more candidates were nominated, voting would occur one week after the nomination date set in the writ. The Returning Officer would establish polling stations throughout the constituency. On polling day, the polls would open in each station and voters would cast their ballots in the locked ballot box. When the polls closed, the deputy returning officers would unlock the ballot box, count the ballots in the presence of the candidates or their agents, and prepare a record of the vote. The deputy returning officer would then place all of the records and ballots in the ballot box, lock it, and deliver the ballot box to the Returning Officer.

Once all the ballot boxes were received, the Returning Officer would open all the ballot boxes in the presence of witnesses and total the votes from each polling station. The Returning Officer would declare the candidate with the most votes elected. If there was a tie between the top two candidates, the Returning Officer was required to give a written casting vote immediately to decide the election. In no other circumstances could the Returning Officer vote.

The Returning Officer would then prepare a complete report of the results of the election, along with his return of the writ, and forward it all to the Clerk of the Crown in Chancery.

== Results ==
The election resulted in a hung parliament: neither of the parties had a majority. Two Independent Conservatives were elected, who held the balance of power.

1878 Election Results
Party	Party leader	Seats			Popular vote		
Party	Party leader	1875	Elected	Seat Change	Votes Cast	Percentage	% Change
Conservative	Charles Boucher de Boucherville	43	32	-11	68,035	49.49%	-1.2%
Liberal	Henri-Gustave Joly de Lotbinière	19	31	12	65,285	47.49%	+8.9%
Independent Conservative		3	2	-1	4,156	3.02%	-7.7%
Other		0	0	0	4,156	3.02%	-7.7%
Total		65	65	-	137,476	100%	-

Popular vote
Conservative	49.49%
Liberal	47.49%
Others	3.02%

Seats summary
Conservative	49.23%
Liberal	47.69%
Others	3.08%

== See also ==
- List of premiers of Quebec
- Politics of Quebec
- Timeline of Quebec history
- List of political parties in Quebec
- 4th Quebec Legislature
