= Joseph-Gaspard Laviolette =

Canadian politician

Joseph-Gaspard Laviolette M.L.C.
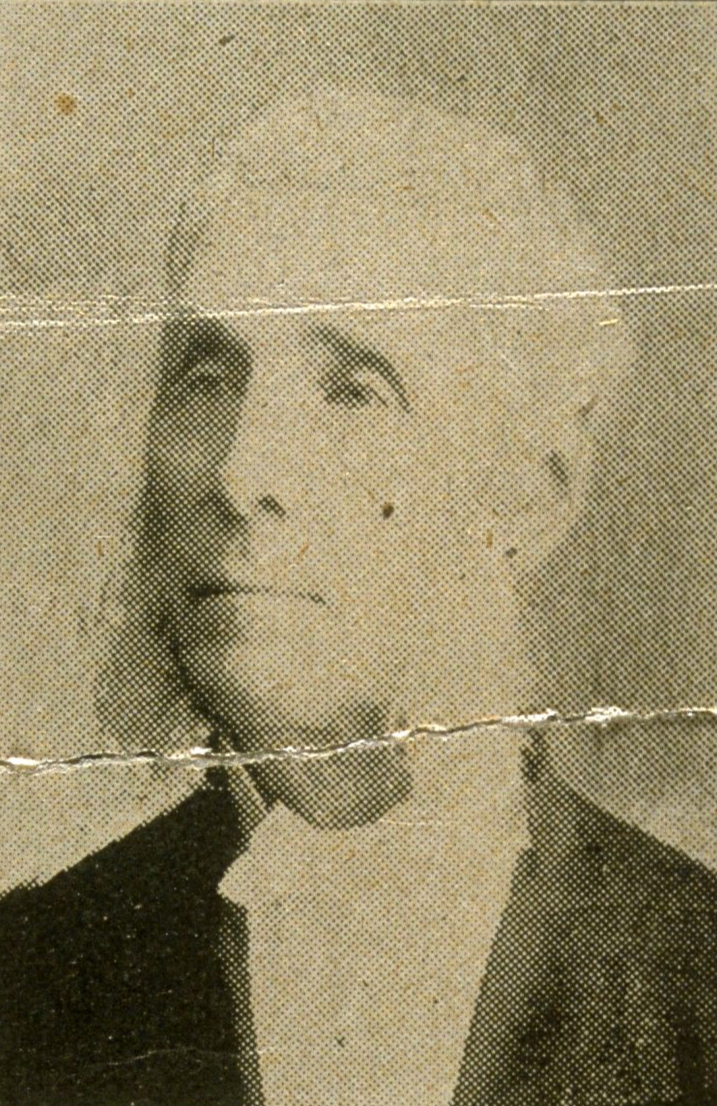

Member of the Legislative Council of Quebec
- In office May 1, 1876 – March 11, 1897
- Preceded by: Charles-Séraphin Rodier
- Succeeded by: Jean Girouard
- Constituency: De Lorimier Division

Personal details
- Born: March 1, 1812 Saint-Eustache, Lower Canada
- Died: October 4, 1903 (aged 91) Montreal, Quebec
- Party: Conservative
- Spouse(s): (1) Julie Colin-Laliberté (2) Corinne Bédard
- Education: Collège de Montréal
- Profession: Seigneur, banker and insurance companies

Joseph-Gaspard Laviolette (March 1, 1812 - October 4, 1903) was a seigneur, businessman and politician in the province of Quebec, Canada. He served in the Legislative Council of Quebec, the upper house of the Legislature of Quebec.

Laviolette was born at Saint-Eustache, Lower Canada, the son Lieutenant Colonel Jean-Baptiste-Étienne Guernier dit Laviolette and Louise-Adélaïde Lemaire Saint-Germain.

Laviolette was educated at the Collège de Montréal. In 1834, he married Christine-Célanie Roy-Portelance. In 1859, he married Corinne Bédard.

He became the seigneur of Sherrington, a lieutenant-colonel in the militia, and a justice of the peace. He was a census commissioner from 1860 to 1870. Active in business, he was a director of the Montreal and Champlain Railroad, a vice-president of administration of the Provincial Bank of Canada, and a founder of the Compagnie d'assurance Canadienne.

Entering politics, Laviolette was the mayor of municipal parish of Saint-Cyprien-de-De Léry from July 23, 1855, to December 30, 1856, and mayor of Napierville from February 1873 to July 19, 1875. In 1875, he was the prefect of the county of Napierville-Laprairie.

In 1876, Laviolette was appointed to the Legislative Council of Quebec by the Conservative government of Premier Charles Boucher de Boucherville, for the division of de Lorimier. A life appointment, Laviolette held the position for close to twenty-one years, before resigning in 1897 at age 85.

Laviolette died at Montreal, at age 91. He was buried in the Notre Dame des Neiges Cemetery in Montreal.
