= Narcisse Lecavalier =

Canadian politician

Member of the Legislative Assembly of Quebec for Jacques-Cartier
- In office 1867–1882
- Succeeded by: Joseph-Alfred Mousseau

Personal details
- Born: July 3, 1827 Saint-Laurent, Lower Canada
- Died: April 30, 1892 (aged 64) Saint-Laurent, Quebec
- Party: Conservative

Narcisse Lecavalier (July 3, 1827 – April 30, 1892) was a notary and political figure in Quebec. He represented Jacques-Cartier from 1867 to 1882 as a Conservative member.

He was born in Saint-Laurent, Lower Canada, the son of Guillaume Lecavalier and Marie-Louise Groulx. Lecavalier studied theology at the Séminaire de Sainte-Thérèse. In 1853, he qualified as a notary and set up practice in Saint-Laurent. He married Marie-Émilie Grevier in 1856. Over the years, Lecavalier was secretary-treasurer for the municipal councils and for the school boards of Saint-Laurent, Notre-Dame-de-Grâce and Côte-des-Neiges. He resigned his seat in the Quebec assembly after he was named registrar for the counties of Hochelaga and Jacques-Cartier in 1882. He died at Saint-Laurent at the age of 64.
