= Lecavalier =

Lecavalier is a surname that may refer to:

- Laurine Lecavelier French figure skater
- Louise Lecavalier, Canadian dancer
- Narcisse Lecavalier (1827–1892), notary and political figure in Quebec
- René Lecavalier (1918–1999), Canadian French-language radio show host and sportscaster on SRC in Quebec
- Vincent Lecavalier, Canadian ice hockey player
