= Montreal Urban Community =

- Dissolved Region
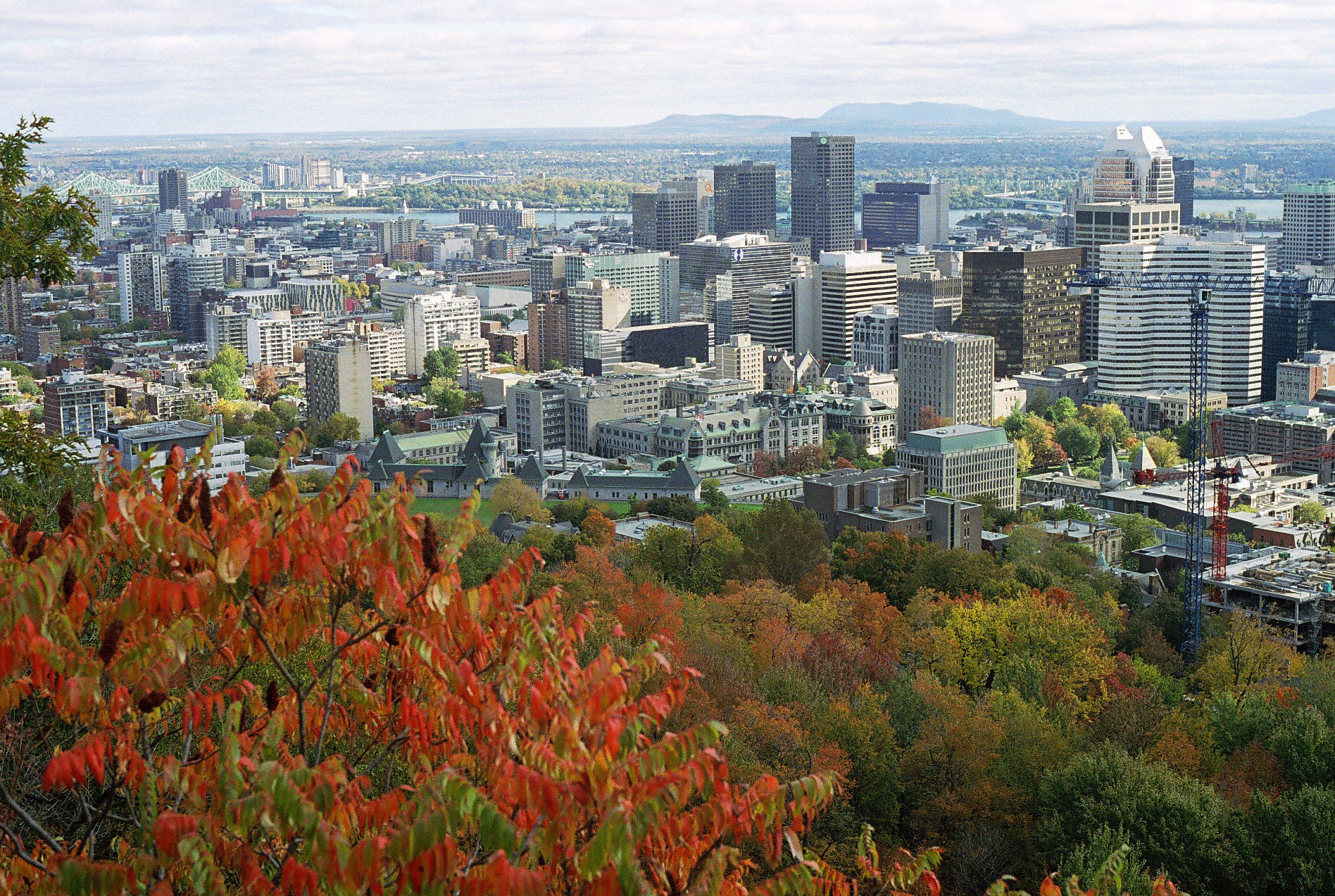
- Downtown Montreal seen from Mont Royal

- Flag Logo

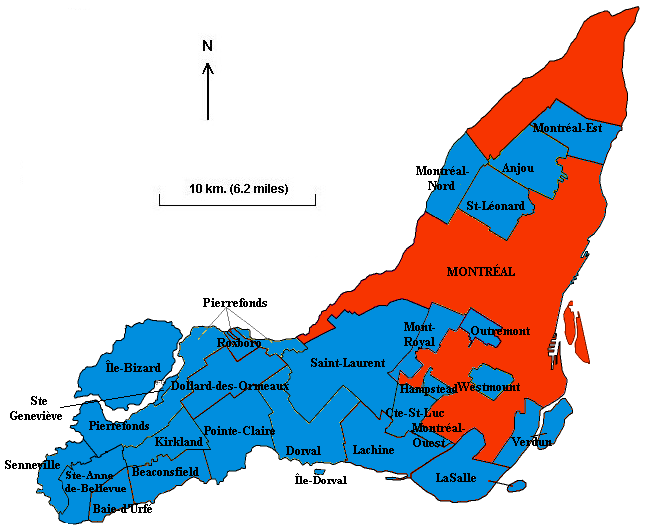
- The MUC at the time of its dissolution
- Coordinates: 45°31′01″N 073°40′01″W
- Country: Canada
- Province: Quebec
- Established: 1970
- Dissolved: 2002 into the megacity

Area
  - Total: 185.94 km^{2} (71.79 sq mi)

Population (2001)
  - Total: 1,039,534
- Time zone: UTC−04:00 (EST)
- Address: 11171, boul. Métropolitain Est, Montréal-Est, H1C 2B8
- Website: http://www.cum.qc.ca

The Montreal Urban Community (MUC) (French: Communauté urbaine de Montréal, pronounced [kɔmynote yʁbɛn də mɔ̃ʁeal], CUM) was a regional government in Quebec, Canada, that covered all municipalities located on the Island of Montreal and the islands of L'Île-Dorval and Île Bizard from January 1970 (when it was created from the former Jacques-Cartier County) until the end of December 2001. These municipalities were merged into the megacity of Montreal on January 1, 2002. After the partial demergers of 2006, a successor organization was formed, the Urban agglomeration of Montreal.

== History ==
The supra-municipal level of government provided public transit service and police services. The MUC was first succeeded by Montreal Metropolitan Community (MMC). Since the merger and subsequent demerger, the MUC has been replaced by the Montreal Agglomeration Council. This left the MMC in place, so the Agglomeration Council is a supra-municipal entity between the municipal level and the regional municipal level.

== See also ==
- Metropolitan Toronto, Toronto's former analogue of the MUC.
