= Gédéon Ouimet =

2nd Premier of Quebec (1873–1874)

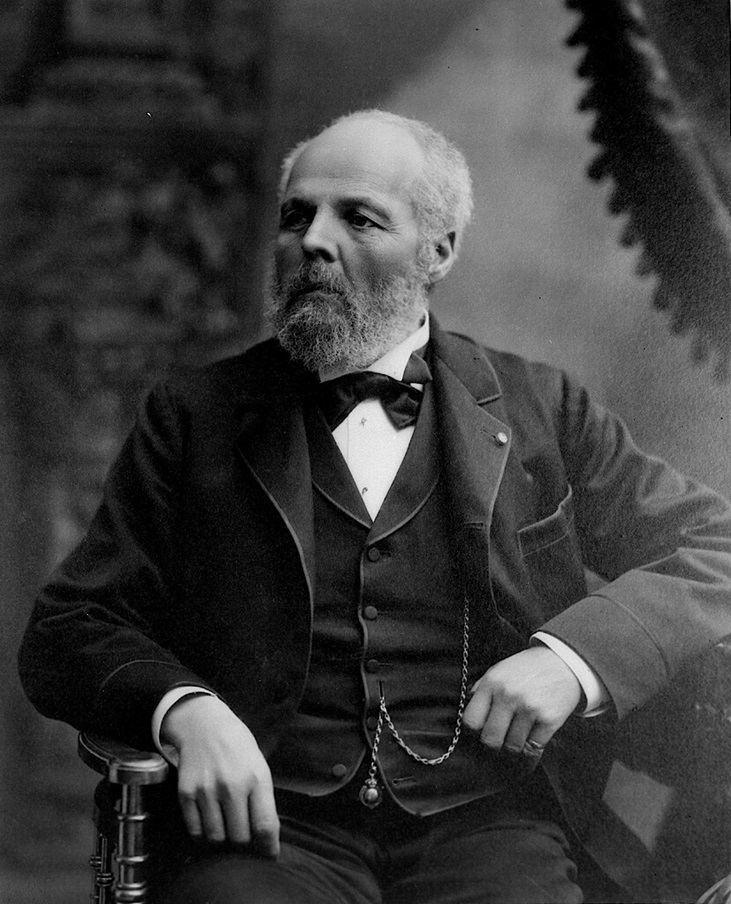

2nd Premier of Quebec
- In office February 27, 1873 – September 22, 1874
- Monarch: Victoria
- Lieutenant Governor: René-Édouard Caron
- Preceded by: Pierre-Joseph-Olivier Chauveau
- Succeeded by: Charles Boucher de Boucherville

Deux-Montagnes
- In office September 1, 1867 – January 28, 1876
- Preceded by: none
- Succeeded by: Charles Champagne

Member of Legislative Council for Rougemont
- In office May 2, 1895 – April 23, 1905
- Appointed by: Narcisse-Fortunat Belleau
- Preceded by: Pierre Boucher de la Bruère
- Succeeded by: François Gosselin

Personal details
- Born: June 2, 1823 Sainte-Rose (Laval), Lower Canada
- Died: April 23, 1905 (aged 81) Mont-Saint-Hilaire, Quebec
- Party: Conservative
- Spouse: Marie-Jeanne Pellant (m. 1850)

Gédéon Ouimet (June 2, 1823 – April 23, 1905) was a French-Canadian politician.

Born in what is today part of the city of Laval, Quebec Canada, Ouimet served as the second premier of Quebec from February 26, 1873 to September 22, 1874. He resigned as party leader of the Conservative Party of Quebec in 1874 because of the Tanneries scandal which implicated the government of Quebec.

He was appointed to the Legislative Council of Quebec in 1895.

He died in Mont-Saint-Hilaire, Quebec in 1905.

The Quebec town of Grandmont changed its name to Saint-Gédéon in honour of Ouimet. A bridge on Highway 15 (Laurentian) was also named after him; the bridge crosses the Rivière des Mille Îles. It connects the municipality of Laval to the northern shore in what is now known as the town of Boisbriand.

== See also ==
- Politics of Quebec
- List of Quebec general elections
- Timeline of Quebec history
- List of presidents of the Saint-Jean-Baptiste Society of Montreal

Political offices
Preceded by Charles Daoust (Parti rouge)	MLA, District of Beauharnois; 1858–1861	Succeeded by Paul Denis (Parti bleu)
