= 1875 Quebec general election =

Canadian provincial election

- June 7, 1875

65 seats in the 3rd Legislative Assembly of Quebec 33 seats needed for a majority
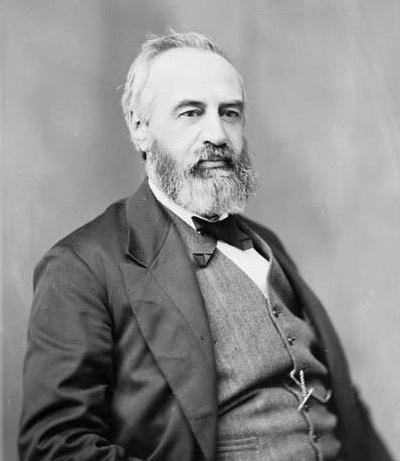

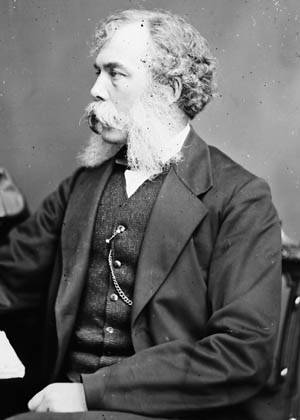
	First party	Second party
Leader	Charles Boucher de Boucherville	Henri-Gustave Joly de Lotbinière
Party	Conservative	Liberal
Leader since	1874	1869
Leader's seat	Montarville Division, Legislative Council	Lotbinière, Legislative Assembly
Last election	46 seats 51.7% popular vote	19 seats 39.4% popular vote
Seats won	43	19
Seat change	▼3	0
Popular vote	44,328	33,763
Percentage	51.0%	38.8%
Swing	▼0.7%	▼0.6%
- Map of the results by riding.
Premier before election
Charles Boucher de Boucherville
Conservative Party of Quebec
Premier after election
Charles Boucher de Boucherville
Conservative Party of Quebec

The 1875 Quebec general election was held on July 7, 1875, to elect members of the 3rd Legislative Assembly for the Province of Quebec, Canada. The Quebec Conservative Party, led by Charles-Eugène Boucher de Boucherville, defeated the Quebec Liberal Party, led by Henri-Gustave Joly de Lotbinière.

The election was the first one held under the new Quebec Elections Act, passed by the de Boucherville government to replace the pre-Confederation elections law. The new law provided for the secret ballot in Quebec elections for the first time. Under the pre-Confederation elections law, each voter had been required to publicly declare their vote to the elections officials, a form of open ballotting.

== Franchise and qualification ==
=== Right to vote ===
The right to vote in elections to the Legislative Assembly was not universal. Only male British subjects (by birth or naturalisation), aged 21 or older, were eligible to vote, and only if they met a property qualification. For residents of larger cities, the qualification was being the owner or occupant of real property assessed at three hundred dollars or more, or for tenants, an annual rent of thirty dollars or more. For any other municipality, the qualification was being an owner or occupant of real property assessed at two hundred dollars or more, or twenty dollars in annual value. For tenants in smaller centers, the qualification was paying an annual rent of twenty dollars or more.

Women were completely barred from voting.

Judges and many municipal and provincial officials were also barred from voting, particularly officials with law enforcement duties, or duties relating to public revenue. The Returning Officer in each riding was also barred from voting, except when needed to give a casting vote in the event of a tie vote.

=== Qualification for the Legislative Assembly ===
Candidates for election to the Legislative Assembly had to meet stricter qualifications than voters. To stand for election, a candidate had to

1. Be at least twenty-one years of age;
2. Be of the male sex;
3. Be a subject of Her Majesty (either by birth or naturalisation);
4. Be free from all legal incapacity;
5. Be the proprietor in possession of lands or tenements worth at least $2,000, over and above all encumbrances and charges on the property.

Women were completely barred from membership in the Assembly.

== Electoral map ==
The Legislative Assembly was composed of sixty-five single-member constituencies or "ridings". The 1875 election was conducted under the pre-Confederation electoral map of the former Province of Canada. That map had set the boundaries for the sixty-five constituencies of Canada East, which became Quebec. The British North America Act, 1867 provided that the pre-Confederation electoral map would continue to be used for Quebec elections until altered by the Legislature of Quebec. The map of the sixty-five constituencies was also to be used in federal elections, until altered by Parliament.

== Conduct of the election ==
=== New election law ===
The election was the first election conducted under The Quebec Election Act, a completely new election law passed by the Quebec Legislature. The new Act replaced the pre-Confederation election law, which had been continued in use for the first two elections, in 1867 and 1871. Two significant changes under the new law were the introduction of the secret ballot, and a requirement that all constituencies vote on the same day.

=== Secret ballot ===
The 1875 election for the Legislative Assembly was the first time the secret ballot was used in Quebec. Under the pre-Confederation law used in the first two general elections, voting had been by open ballotting, where voters publicly declared their vote to the polling officials.

=== Preparation of voter lists ===
The Act required that each municipality prepare a voter list in March of each year, based on the valuation of property and ownership used for the tax rolls. The list was drawn up the secretary-treasurer of each municipality. The municipal council then reviewed the list and could make corrections to it. Once approved by the municipal council, the list was in force until the preparation of the list in the next year. Any person who was dissatisfied by their inclusion or exclusion from the list could appeal to the local judge of the superior court or district magistrate, whose decision on the issue was final.

=== Procedure for the election ===
The election began with a proclamation issued by the Lieutenant Governor of Quebec, setting the date for nomination of candidates. The date was the same for all constituencies. The provincial Clerk of the Crown in Chancery then issued sixty-five writs, directed to the Returning Officer for each constituency, directing them to conduct the election. The Returning Officer would be the registrar or sheriff of the constituency.

On the date set for nominations, the Returning Officer would hold a public meeting to receive nominations. The meeting was conducted at the most central and convenient location in the constituency, in a court house, city hall or registry office, between noon and one o'clock.

To be nominated, a candidate had to file a nomination paper with the Returning Officer, signed by at least twenty-five supporters eligible to vote in the constituency, and accompanied with a deposit of $200. The nomination paper and deposit had to be filed on or before the nomination meeting.

If only one nomination was received, the Returning Officer would declare that person to be elected, and immediately report the result to the Clerk of the Crown in Chancery with the return of the writ. If two or more candidates were nominated, voting would occur one week after the nomination date set in the writ. The Returning Officer would establish polling stations throughout the constituency. On polling day, the polls would open in each station and voters would cast their ballots in the locked ballot box. When the polls closed, the deputy returning officers would unlock the ballot box, count the ballots in the presence of the candidates or their agents, and prepare a record of the vote. The deputy returning officer would then place all of the records and ballots in the ballot box, lock it, and deliver the ballot box to the Returning Officer.

Once all the ballot boxes were received, the Returning Officer would open all the ballot boxes in the presence of witnesses and total the votes from each polling station. The Returning Officer would declare the candidate with the most votes elected. If there was a tie between the top two candidates, the Returning Officer was required to give a written casting vote immediately to decide the election. In no other circumstances could the Returning Officer vote.

The Returning Officer would then prepare a complete report of the results of the election, along with his return of the writ, and forward it all to the Clerk of the Crown in Chancery.

== Results ==
The election resulted in a Conservative victory. The Conservatives were maintained in office with a strong majority, although a somewhat reduced seat count. The Liberals held steady with nineteen seats, the same as in the 1871 election.

1875 Election Results
Party	Party Leader	Seats			Popular Vote		
Party	Party Leader	1871	Elected	Seat Change	Votes Cast	Percentage	Percentage Change
Conservative	Charles-Eugène Boucher de Boucherville	46	43	-3	44,328	50.67%	-1.1%
Liberal	Henri-Gustave Joly de Lotbinière	19	19	0	33,763	38.59%	-0.8%
Independent Conservative		0	3	+3	8,850	10.74%	+1.9%
Other		-	0	-	8,850	10.74%	+1.9%
Total		65	65	-	86,941	100%	-

Popular vote
Conservative	50.67%
Liberal	38.59%
Others	10.74%

Seats summary
Conservative	66.15%
Liberal	29.23%
Others	4.62%

== See also ==
- List of premiers of Quebec
- Politics of Quebec
- Timeline of Quebec history
- List of political parties in Quebec
- 3rd Quebec Legislature
