= Jean-Baptiste Lefebvre de Villemure =

Canadian politician (1828–1885)

Jean-Baptiste Lefebvre de Villemure (January 29, 1828 – August 4, 1885) was a notary and political figure in Quebec. He sat for Mille-Isles division in the Legislative Council of Quebec from 1880 to 1882 as a Conservative. Lefebvre de Villemure was also mayor of Saint-Jérôme from 1874 to 1879.

He was born in Terrebonne, Lower Canada, the son of Jean-Baptiste Lefebvre de Villemure and Marie-Amable Lemaître, dit Auger. He first taught school and then qualified as a notary in 1851, setting up practice in Saint-Jérôme. Lefebvre de Villemure also acted as an agent for Augustin-Norbert Morin. He served as postmaster for Saint-Jérôme and was also secretary-treasurer for the school board. He was married twice: to Marguerite-Olive, the daughter of Casimir-Amable Testard de Montigny, in 1852 and to Marguerite Loupret in 1858. He died at Saint-Jérôme at the age of 57.
