= Testard de Montigny =

Testard de Montigny may refer to:

- Jacques Testard de Montigny (1663–1737)
- Casimir-Amable Testard de Montigny (1787–1863), businessman and politician
