= Horace Bélanger =

Horace Bélanger (June 11, 1836 – October 1, 1892) was born in Rivière-Ouelle, Lower Canada and became involved in the fur trade with the Hudson's Bay Company.

During his career with the HBC, Bélanger became the first French Canadian to become a Chief Factor. He ended his service at Norway House, Manitoba where he became Justice of the Peace for the Keewatin District. A stone monument was erected there in his memory after his drowning death at Sea River Falls on the Nelson River.

Bélanger's half-brother was Luc Letellier de Saint-Just.
