= Alphonse Raymond =

Canadian politician

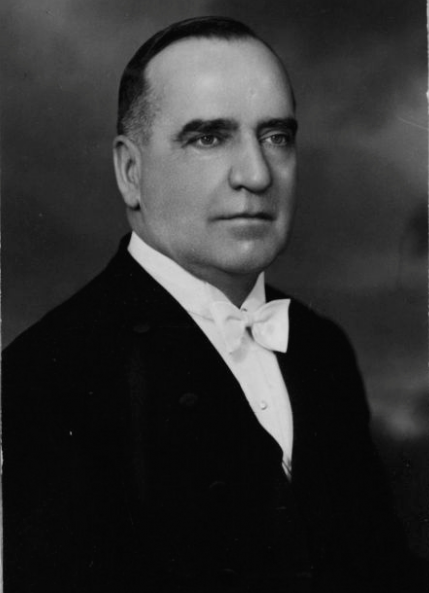

Member of the Legislative Council of Quebec for de Lorimier
- In office 1936–1958
- Preceded by: Jean Girouard
- Succeeded by: John Pozer Rowat

Personal details
- Born: July 26, 1884 Sainte-Anne-de-Beaupré, Quebec, Canada
- Died: June 6, 1958 (aged 73) Montreal, Quebec, Canada
- Party: Union Nationale

Alphonse Raymond (July 26, 1884 – June 6, 1958) was a Quebec businessman, financier and public official.

He was born in Sainte-Anne-de-Beaupré, Quebec and educated at Quebec's Normal School. He moved to Montreal in 1902 and founded a canning factory in 1905.

In his commercial life, he was a director of Catelli Food Products Ltd., vice-president of the Montreal Refrigerating and Storage Ltd., and vice-president of the Provincial Bank of Canada as well as a board member of several finance and investment firms. He also held several governance positions at the University of Montreal.

Raymond was appointed to the Legislative Council of Quebec representing the division of Lorimier in 1936 by Quebec Premier Maurice Duplessis and sat on the body for the rest of his life as a supporter of the Union Nationale. He served as Speaker of the council from 1936 to 1940 and again from 1944 to 1950.
