= Michel Tellier =

Canadian politician

Michel Tellier (February 28, 1750 – October 20, 1834) was a farmer and political figure in Lower Canada. He represented Hertford in the Legislative Assembly of Lower Canada from 1800 to 1804. His name also appears as Michel Letellier.

He was born in Saint-Vallier, the son of a French-born soldier François Letellier and Marie-Françoise Pelletier. He operated a farm at Saint-Vallier. Tellier did not run for reelection in 1804. He was married twice: to Marie-Louise Moreau in 1774 and then to Marie-Hélène Queret in 1808. Tellier died in Saint-Vallier at the age of 84.

His grandfather is Michel Letellier who, originally from Saint-Quentin, in the diocese of Noyon, migrated to New France around 1705 with his wife Marie Mélie. Their son, François Letellier de Saint-Just, born in Québec in 1709, became a soldier in Fouville's company and retired from the troops in October 1740, after marrying Marie-Françoise Pelletier in Québec on January 25, 1740. Michel Tellier is their son. Michel Tellier's grandson Luc Letellier de Saint-Just served in the assembly for the Province of Canada and as Lieutenant Governor of Quebec.
