= Pierre Boucher de la Bruère =

Canadian politician

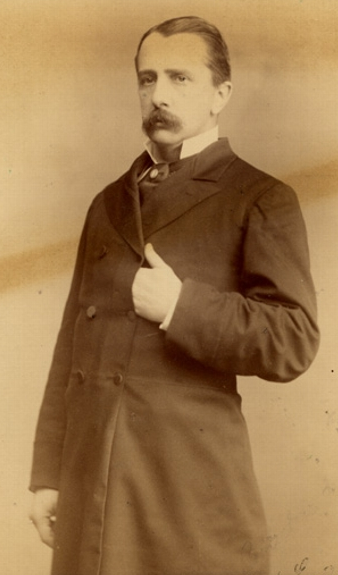

Member of the Legislative Council of Quebec for Rougemont
- In office 1877–1895
- Preceded by: John Fraser de Berry
- Succeeded by: Gédéon Ouimet

Personal details
- Born: July 5, 1837 Saint-Hyacinthe, Lower Canada
- Died: March 6, 1917 (aged 79) Quebec City, Quebec, Canada
- Party: Conservative

Pierre Boucher de la Bruère (baptized Joseph-René-Pierre-Hypolite) (July 5, 1837 – March 6, 1917) was a Canadian lawyer, journalist, author, office holder, and politician.

Born in Saint-Hyacinthe, Lower Canada, the son of Pierre-Claude Boucher de La Bruère and Hippolyte Boucher de Labroquerie, he studied at the Séminaire de Saint-Hyacinthe. From 1857 to 1858 he studied law at the Université Laval and he was called to the bar of Lower Canada in 1860. He started practicing law in Saint-Hyacinthe and was protonotary for the judicial district of Saint-Hyacinthe from 1870 to 1875. In 1875, he became editor of Le Courrier de Saint-Hyacinthe and became owner in 1877.

In 1877, he was named to the Legislative Council of Quebec for the Rougemont division. A Quebec Conservative, he was Speaker of the Council from 1882 to 1889 and again from 1892 to 1895. He resigned in 1895 and was appointed superintendent of public instruction.

He was a member of the group that created the Société d'industrie laitière de la province de Québec in 1882, an organization to improve the dairy industry in Quebec that founded a dairy school in Saint-Hyacinth in 1892, later taken over by the provincial government.
