= Casimir-Amable Testard de Montigny =

Canadian politician (1787–1863)

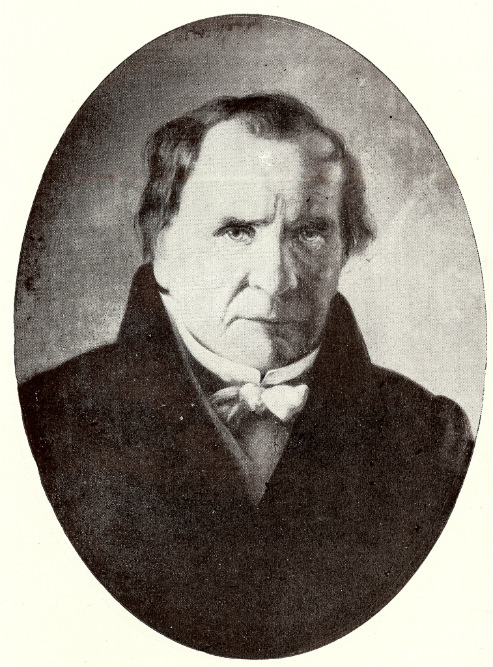
Testard de Montigny

Casimir-Amable Testard de Montigny (June 2, 1787 – January 10, 1863) was a businessman and politician in Quebec. He represented Effingham in the Legislative Assembly of Lower Canada from 1824 to 1827.

He was born in Montreal, the son of Louis-Étienne Testard de Montigny who was the grandson of Jacques Testard de Montigny, and Louise-Archange Gamelin, dit Gaucher. He was educated at the Séminaire de Notre-Dame and the Petit Séminaire de Montréal. He became involved in the fur trade, establishing a small settlement on the Rivière du Nord which eventually became Saint-Jérôme. Testard de Montigny was married twice: to Marthe Godon in 1815 and to Marie-Louise Allaire in 1855. He served as a major in the militia and a commissioner for small causes. Testard de Montigny remained loyal to the government during the Lower Canada Rebellion and was imprisoned by the Patriotes in 1837. He served on the municipal council for Terrebonne County from 1849 to 1851. Testard de Montigny died in Saint-Jérôme at the age of 75.

His daughter Marguerite-Olive married Jean-Baptiste Lefebvre de Villemure.
