= Henry Starnes =

Canadian politician

Mayor Henry Starnes
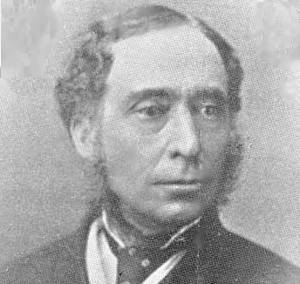
- Henry Starnes; Source: Library and Archives Canada

9th Mayor of Montreal
- In office 1856–1858
- Preceded by: Wolfred Nelson
- Succeeded by: Charles-Séraphin Rodier
- Constituency: West
- In office 1866–1868
- Preceded by: Jean-Louis Beaudry
- Succeeded by: William Workman

Personal details
- Born: 13 October 1816 Kingston, Upper Canada
- Died: March 3, 1896 (aged 79) Montreal, Quebec, Canada
- Spouse: Eleanore Stuart
- Children: 7
- Profession: banker, merchant

Henry Starnes (October 13, 1815 – March 3, 1896) was a Quebec businessman and political figure.

== Biography ==
He was born in Kingston in Upper Canada in 1816 and studied at the Montreal Academical Institution and the Petit Séminaire de Montréal. He began work with James Leslie's food importing business in Montreal and became a partner in the business in 1849. He then served as director for several banks in Montreal. He served on Montreal's City Council from 1852 to 1853 and from 1855 to 1856 and as Mayor from 1856 to 1858 and 1866 to 1868. He was elected to the Legislative Assembly of the Province of Canada for Châteauguay in 1858; he was reelected in 1861. He was named to the Legislative Council of Quebec for Salaberry division in 1867. In 1859, he had become manager for the Montreal branch of the Ontario Bank; in 1871, he helped establish the Metropolitan Bank and became its first president. That bank served as a conduit for transferring contributions from Sir Hugh Allan to George-Étienne Cartier; in exchange, Cartier had promised Allan the contract for the transcontinental railroad. The exposure of this arrangement led to the Pacific Scandal and the fall of John A. Macdonald's Conservative government. The Metropolitan Bank closed in 1876; Starnes' unorthodox financial management was blamed for its collapse. He served as speaker for the legislative council from 1878 to 1882; he served in the provincial executive council as railway commissioner from 1882 to 1884 and commissioner of agriculture and public works in 1887.

He died in Montreal in 1896 and was entombed at the Notre Dame des Neiges Cemetery in Montreal.

== Family ==
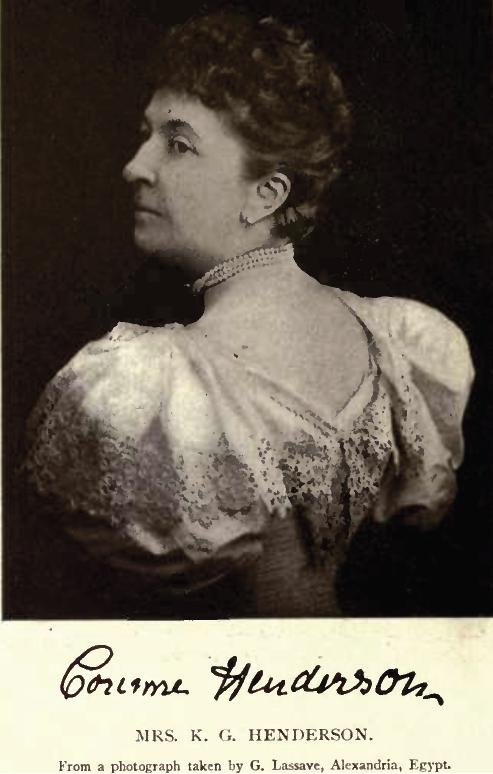
Mrs Corinne Henderson (née Starnes)

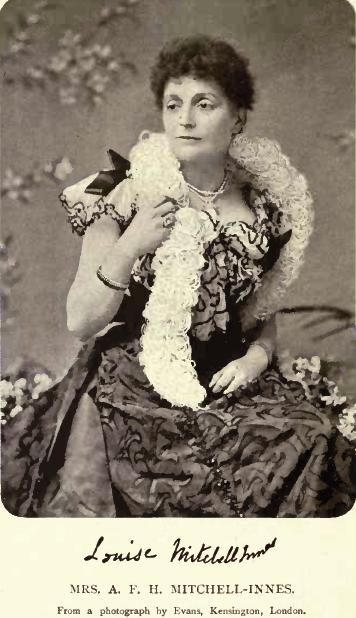
Mrs. Louise Mitchell Innes (née Starnes)

Hon. Henry Starnes married Eleanor Stuart. The couple had three daughters: Louise, Eleanor and Corinne. Louise Starnes married Captain Mitchell-Innes, 60th Rifles. Eleanor Starnes married the Hon. J. R. D. Tollemache, a son of John Tollemache, 1st Baron Tollemache. Corinne Starnes married, May 31, 1869, Kenneth Gregg Henderson, Captain H.M.'s 60th Rifles, who had distinguished himself during the Indian Mutiny and in China, and became, successively, colonel of his regiment, a major-general, and commandant of the garrison at Alexandria. He was created a C.B., 1887, and died August, 1902.

Louise Amelia Lititia Starnes married, in Montreal, Quebec, October 27, 1870, Alexander Ferdinand Henry Mitchell-Innes, Captain 60th Rifles, fourth son of Alexander Mitchell-Innes, J.P. and D.L. of Ayton Castle, County Berwick, Scotland, and his wife, Charlotte Gordon, daughter of Sir Thomas Dick Lauder, Bart., and has issue two sons and one daughter.

Henry Starnes is the grandfather of the diplomat and civil servant John Starnes.

== Gallery ==
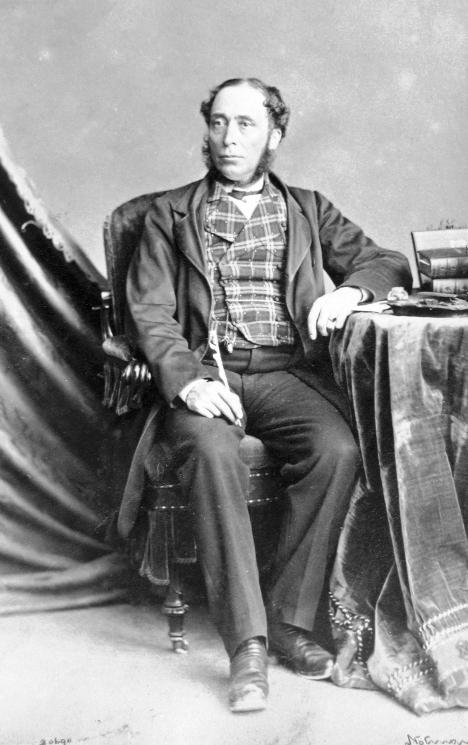
