= Battery industry in Quebec =

The battery industry of Quebec encompasses all activities related to the production, research, and development of electric batteries in the Canadian province of Quebec. This industry has grown in response to the increasing demand for lithium-ion batteries, primarily in the context of electric mobility and renewable energy.

Quebec possesses significant reserves of lithium and graphite, two essential raw materials for the manufacture of lithium-ion batteries. The availability of these natural resources has attracted investments and industrial projects to the province.

== History ==
In 2019, a study commissioned by Propulsion Québec emphasized the crucial importance of quickly positioning Quebec as a hub for the lithium-ion battery industry for electric vehicles due to rising demand and the need to reduce carbon footprint.

In 2021, Investissement Québec outlined its strategy to invest massively, using both public and private funds, between 1 and 2 billion Canadian dollars over two to three years to strengthen international expertise at every stage of the battery production chain.

Quebec has established partnerships with international companies in the battery sector, further solidifying its position as a global supplier of battery components.

In 2023, the Quebec government announced various support measures to encourage research, development, and battery production within the territory. The government granted a $150 million loan to Ultium CAM, a joint venture between General Motors (GM) and POSCO Future M, to establish a cathode materials production plant in Bécancour. Similarly, the government provided a $150 million loan to Solutions énergétiques Volta Canada for the construction of a copper foil manufacturing plant for electric vehicle batteries in Granby.

== Criticisms ==
In 2023, Laurent Ferreira, CEO of the National Bank, strongly criticized the billions of dollars in subsidies given to the battery industry in Canada, lamenting the attraction of foreign companies at the expense of support for domestic businesses. He pointed out that these subsidies primarily benefit foreign shareholders, not contributing sufficiently to the Canadian economy. In response, Quebec's Minister of Economy, Pierre Fitzgibbon, defended the subsidies, emphasizing their importance for the development of the battery industry in Quebec while advocating for targeted government intervention in selecting sectors that justify such subsidies. He also positioned the Quebec government between advocates of laissez-faire and interventionism, considering targeted intervention as essential for stimulating the economy.
