= Henri-Gustave Joly de Lotbinière =

4th Premier of Quebec (1878–1879)

The Honourable Sir Henri-Gustave Joly de Lotbinière PC KCMG
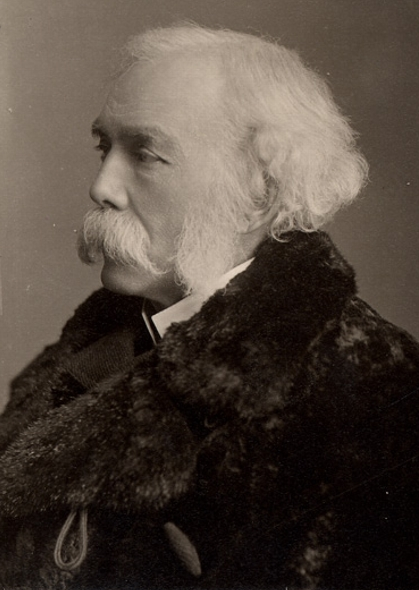
- Henri-Gustave Joly de Lotbinière, c. 1890

4th Premier of Quebec
- In office March 8, 1878 – October 31, 1879
- Monarch: Victoria
- Lieutenant Governor: Luc Letellier de St.-Just; Théodore Robitaille
- Preceded by: Charles Boucher de Boucherville
- Succeeded by: Joseph-Adolphe Chapleau

7th Lieutenant Governor of British Columbia
- In office June 21, 1900 – May 11, 1906
- Monarchs: Victoria; Edward VII
- Governors General: The Earl of Minto; The Earl Grey
- Premier: James Dunsmuir; Edward Gawler Prior; Richard McBride
- Preceded by: Thomas Robert McInnes
- Succeeded by: James Dunsmuir

MLA for Lotbinière
- In office September 1, 1867 – November 25, 1885
- Preceded by: Provincial district created in 1867
- Succeeded by: Édouard-Hippolyte Laliberté

Member of the Canadian Parliament for Lotbinière
- In office September 20, 1867 – January 22, 1874
- Preceded by: none
- Succeeded by: Henry Bernier

Member of the Canadian Parliament for Portneuf
- In office June 23, 1896 – November 7, 1900
- Preceded by: Arthur Delisle
- Succeeded by: Michel-Siméon Delisle

Personal details
- Born: Henri-Gustave Joly; December 5, 1829 Épernay, France
- Died: November 16, 1908 (aged 78) Quebec City, Canada
- Resting place: Mount Hermon Cemetery, Sillery, Quebec, Canada
- Party: Quebec Liberal Party
- Children: Alain Chartier Joly de Lotbiniere

Sir Henri-Gustave Joly de Lotbinière, PC, KCMG (December 5, 1829 – November 16, 1908), lawyer, businessman and politician, served as the fourth premier of Quebec, a federal Cabinet minister, and the seventh Lieutenant Governor of British Columbia.

== Biography ==
=== Early years ===
Sir Henri-Gustave Joly de Lotbinière, PC was born as Henry-Gustave Joly in Épernay, France. His father's family was one of the traditional Huguenot families from Switzerland, while his mother's family was a well-established seigneurial family in New France and then Lower Canada, and Roman Catholic. Initially a Huguenot himself, Henri-Gustave converted to Anglicanism before he married in 1856.

His father, Gaspard-Pierre-Gustave Joly de Lotbinière, was a pioneer of early photography (the first man to photograph the Acropolis, in 1839) who made a series of daguerreotypes while on a Grand Tour through Greece, Egypt and the Holy Land.

Henri-Gustave's mother was Julie-Christine, the youngest daughter of Michel-Eustache-Gaspard-Alain Chartier de Lotbinière, who inherited the seigneury of Lotbinière, in 1828. His parents' marriage was not a happy one, which is perhaps not surprising as his father had first proposed to Julie-Christine's eldest sister, Louise-Josephe, the Seigneuresse de Vaudreuil, who instead chose to marry Robert Unwin Harwood.

Henri-Gustave Joly studied in Paris from 1836 to 1849, obtaining his bachelier ès lettres from the Sorbonne. He returned to Canada in 1850 and was called to the bar in 1855. Joly inherited the lands and title of seigneur of Lotbinière in 1860. He added "de Lotbinière" (part of his mother's maiden name) to his name in 1888.

=== Family ===
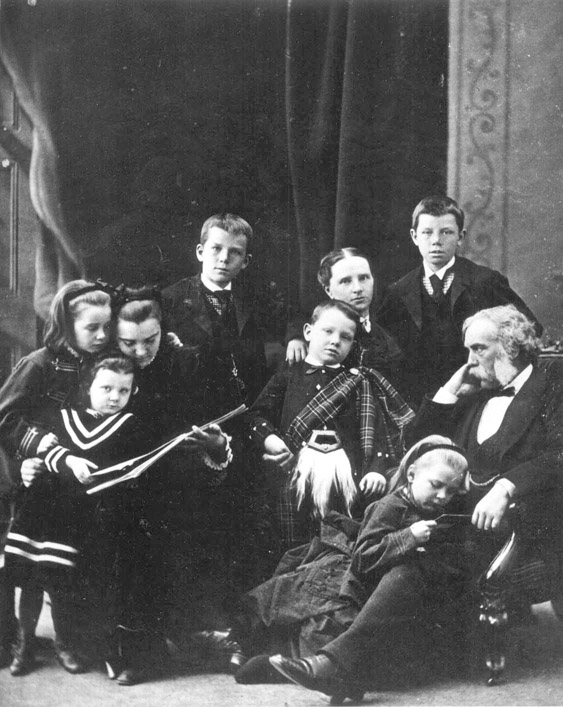
Family of Henri Gustave Joly de Lotbinière and Margaretta Josepha Gowen, c. 1875

Joly married Margaretta-Josepha Gowen (25 July 1837 – 14 August 1904), daughter of Hammond Gowen of Quebec, and was the father of eleven children, of whom seven (four girls and three boys) reached adulthood. Their daughter, Margaretta-Anna, married Brigadier-General Herbert Colborne Nanton (1863–1935), brother of Augustus Meredith Nanton. His son, Edmond-Gustave Joly de Lotbinère inherited the seigneury of Lotbinière in 1908. Sir Henri-Gustave was the grandfather of Seymour de Lotbiniere, Director of the British Broadcasting Corporation from 1935 to 1940.

== Political career ==
=== Province of Canada ===
Joly was elected to the Legislative Assembly of the Province of Canada for Lotbinière in 1861 as a Bleu, a moderate liberal, but was a member of the more radical Parti rouge when re-elected in 1863.

=== Quebec politics ===
Joly became Leader of the Quebec Liberals at the time of Confederation in 1867.

In 1878, Conservative premier Charles-Eugène Boucher de Boucherville resigned on March 2 since he was about to be deposed by Lieutenant Governor Luc Letellier de Saint-Just. They had a conflict over railroad legislation which de Saint-Just deemed unconstitutional. As a result, Joly became Premier on March 8, 1878, and the first Liberal to become Premier of Quebec. To this day, he remains the only foreign-born and Protestant to be the Leader of the Province of Quebec.

In the May 1, 1878 election, the Liberals won one fewer seat than the Conservatives (there were also two independent Conservatives). However, Joly remained in power in a minority government for about a year and half. His government was brought down by a motion of censure involving the defection of five Liberals (including future premier Edmund James Flynn) to the Conservatives. The Leader of the Opposition Joseph-Adolphe Chapleau was called to form a government on October 31, 1879.

Joly remained Liberal Party leader until 1883. In all, he spent about 17 years as Liberal leader, but served only briefly as Premier.

In 1883, Joly resigned as Liberal leader to make way for Honoré Mercier. He resigned as member of the Legislative Assembly in November 1885.

=== Federal politics ===
He was the member for the federal riding of Lotbinière in 1867. He was re-elected in Lotbinière in the Canadian Election of 1872, but resigned his seat to concentrate on Quebec politics.

Joly de Lotbinière was once again elected to the federal House of Commons in the 1896 federal election, this time as the member from Portneuf. He served as a federal Cabinet minister from 1897 until he retired in 1900.

=== Forestry work ===
In March 1900 Sir Henri was invited along with J. R. Booth, William Little, Thomas Southworth and Dr. William Saunders by Elihu Stewart, Canada's chief inspector of timber and forestry, to create the Canadian Forestry Association. On 8 March 1900, these men met in the Railway Committee Room of the House of Commons in Ottawa, playing host to lumbermen, foresters, civil servants, railroad executives and others, all concerned about the survival and future use of Canada's forests. The CFA was truly a national organization, with representation from every province and the districts of Assiniboia, Athabaska, Keewatin and Yukon.

Under the chairmanship of Sir Henri, delegates approved bylaws and a constitution of the Canadian Forestry Association, Canada's oldest conservation organization. These early conservationists recognized that the whole field of renewable resources, the forests, waters, wildlife, soils and recreational values, were closely interrelated. The CFA's mission continues to be to promote the protection and wise use of Canada's forest, water and wildlife resources. His participation as the first president of the Canadian Forestry Association was not altered by his ongoing political activity. He continued to put forward new ideas for forestry. In 1906 the CFA convened Canada's first national forestry convention, chaired by Sir Wilfrid Laurier, honorary CFA President. Sir Henri presented a paper in that called for the forest sector to consider conversion to the metric measurement system, a change that would not come to fruition in Canada until the 1980s.

At the 1905 annual meeting of the Canadian Forestry Association in Quebec City, condolences were expressed to Sir Henri on the passing the previous year of his wife. To quote the proceedings: "Then we must all regret the affliction that has come to our honoured president, Sir Henri Joly de Lotbinière and his family in the death of Lady Joly. We all love Sir Henri, and we believe that his name will be remembered for the good work he has done as long as trees grow in this country. He has our sincere sympathy in the affliction that has befallen him."

=== Lieutenant governor of British Columbia ===
Prime Minister Laurier appointed him Lieutenant-Governor of British Columbia in 1900; he served until 1906.

== Death and legacy ==
He died in Quebec City in 1908, and was buried in Mount Hermon Cemetery in Sillery, on 18 November 1908.

His summer estate is now a park and heritage site, open to the public. It is on the list of Canada's Historic Places.

== Elections as party leader ==
He won the 1878 election (the Liberals won one fewer seat than the Conservatives but he remained premier with the support of a few Conservatives). He lost the 1881 election.

== Electoral record ==
1867 Canadian federal election: Lotbinière--Chutes-de-la-Chaudière
Party	Candidate	Votes
Liberal	Henri-Gustave Joly de Lotbinière	acclaimed
Source: Canadian Elections Database

1872 Canadian federal election: Lotbinière
Party	Candidate	Votes
Liberal	Henri-Gustave Joly	acclaimed
Source: Canadian Elections Database

1896 Canadian federal election: Portneuf
Party	Candidate	Votes	%	±%
Liberal	Henri-Gustave Joly de Lotbinière	2,086	50.4	-1.6
Conservative	L. Stafford	2,050	49.6	+1.6
Total valid votes		4,136	100.0	

Federal Ministerial By-Election, July 30, 1896: Portneuf
Party	Candidate	Popular Vote	%
Liberal	X Henri-Gustave Joly de Lotbinière	Acclaimed	–
Total		–	–
Source: Library of Parliament: Portneuf

The by-election was called on Joly de Lotbinière accepting the position of Controller of Inland Revenue, an office of profit under the Crown, on July 13, 1896.

== See also ==
- List of Quebec general elections
- Politics of Quebec
- Provincial premiers who have become Canadian MPs
- Timeline of Quebec history

== Sources ==
- Little, John (2013). Patrician Liberal: The Public and Private Life of Sir Henri-Gustave Joly de Lotbinière, 1829-1908. University of Toronto Press. ISBN 978-1-4426-6699-3.
