= Hochelaga County, Quebec =

Hochelaga County Comté d'Hochelaga
- County
- Interactive map of Hochelaga County
- Coordinates: 45°35′N 73°35′W
- Country: Canada
- Province: Quebec

Hochelaga County was a historic county on the Island of Montreal in the province of Quebec. It existed between 1855 and 1921.

== Wardens ==
The county was administered by a council headed by a warden.

- Joseph-Octave Villeneuve (1866 to 1880)

== Associations ==
- Hochelaga County Agricultural Society (politician Louis Beaubien served as president)

== Sources ==
- NGA GEOnet Names Server (GNS), 18TXR1051648731, http://geonames.nga.mil/ggmagaz/
- Atlas of the city and island of Montreal, including the counties of Jacques Cartier and Hochelaga, 1879. Provincial Surveying and Pub. Co. 1879.
- "City of Montreal – Proclamation to issue applying to the – And the County of Hochelaga, the Act 41 [Victoria Chapter] 17 intituled An Act for the better prevention of crimes of violence etc". Library and Archives Canada.
- Règlements de la Société de construction du comté d'Hochelaga (PDF). Montreal. 1875. By-laws of a financial institution that served this county.
