= List of Quebec general elections =

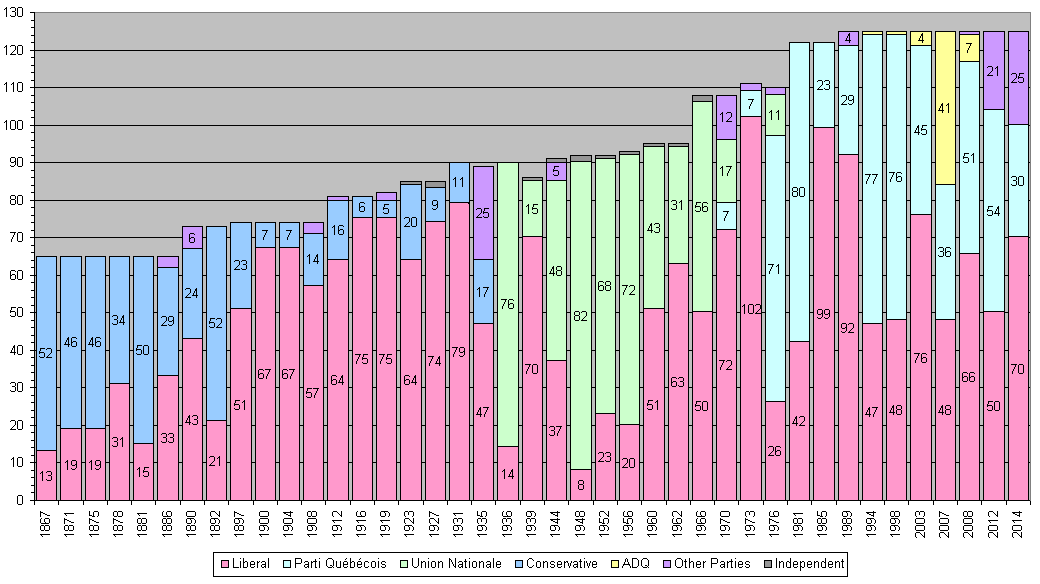
Number of seats won by major parties at each election through 2014: Conservative; Liberal; Union Nationale; Parti Québécois; Independent; ADQ; Other

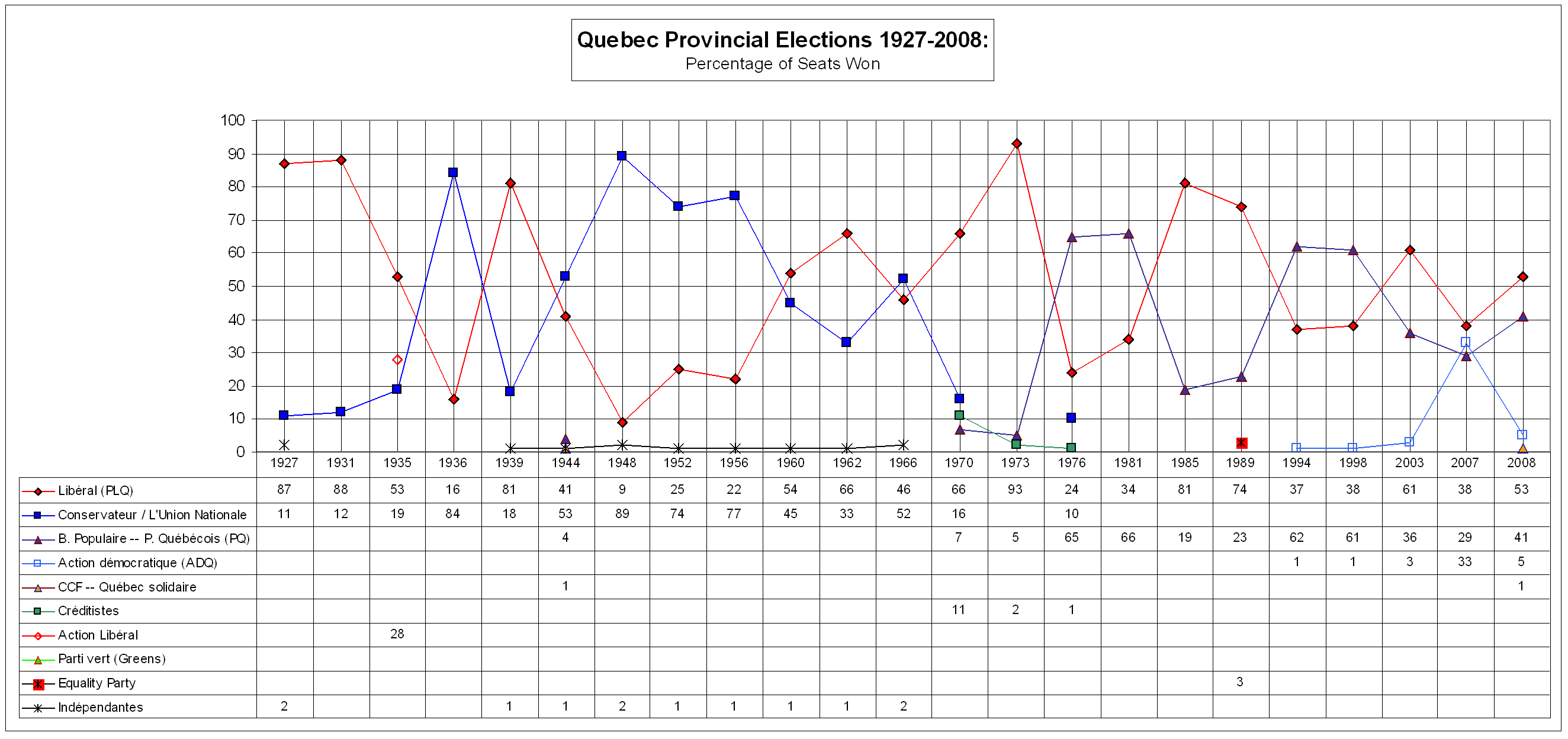
Electoral results by parties and independent MNAs (as a percentage of total National Assembly seats) from 1927 to 2008.

This article provides a summary of results for the general elections to the Canadian province of Quebec's unicameral legislative body, the National Assembly of Quebec (and its predecessor, the Legislative Assembly of Quebec). The number of seats has generally increased over time, from 65 for the first six elections, to the current high of 127.

The chart on the upper right shows the information graphically, with the most recent elections towards the right.

The Conservative party (blue) in 1936 merged into the Union Nationale (now defunct). The 1970s saw the arrival of the sovereignist Parti Québécois, to be followed by Québec solidaire and the Coalition Avenir Québec (CAQ) in 2006 and 2011, respectively. The modern Conservative party saw its first elected members in 2026, the same year that saw the departure of the CAQ.

This article only covers elections since the Canadian Confederation in 1867, when Quebec was created as one of Canada's provinces. For Quebec's first 15 elections as Lower Canada from 1792 to 1840, see Legislative Assembly of Lower Canada. For the 8 joint elections of Ontario and Quebec as the Province of Canada, from 1840 to 1867, see list of elections in the Province of Canada.

== Results ==
Graph of Quebec general election results by share of votes, 1993–2022; omitted are minor parties consistently registering less than 2% of the vote as well as those who campaigned intermittently. View source data.
Graph of Quebec general election results by seats won, 1993–2022; those of independent MNAs are omitted. View source data.

The table below shows the total number of seats won by the political parties in each election. It also shows the percentage of the vote obtained by each party. The winning party's totals are shown in bold. There have been five elections (1998, 1966, 1944, 1892 and 1886) in which the winning party did not have the largest share of the popular vote. Full details on any election are linked via the year of the election at the start of the row.

=== Pre-1936 ===
Election	Total seats	Conservative^{[A]}		Liberal		Other
Election	Total seats	Seats	Vote (%)	Seats	Vote (%)	Seats	Vote (%)	Seat-winning party
1867	65	52^{[G]}	53.48	13^{[F]}	35.40		11.12
1871	65	46	51.72	19	39.43		8.84
1875	65	46	50.67	19	38.59		10.74
1878	65	34	49.49	31^{[H]}	47.49		3.02
1881	65	50	50.38	15	38.97		10.65
1886	65	29	46.19	33	39.58	3	14.23	Parti national
1890	73	24	45.11	43	44.20	6	10.69	Parti national (5); Parti ouvrier (1)
1892	73	52	52.41	21	43.65		13.94
1897	74	23	43.82	51	53.28		2.90
1900	74	7	41.85	67	53.15		5.00
1904	74	7	42.73	67	55.43		1.84
1908	74	14	39.92	57	53.53	3	6.55	Ligue nationaliste
1912	81	16	43.01	64^{[E]}	53.54	1	3.45	Ligue nationaliste
1916	81	6	35.09	75	60.57		4.34
1919	82	5	16.90	75	51.91	2	31.19	Parti ouvrier
1923	85	20	39.32	64	52.52	1	8.16	Independent
1927	85	9	34.31	74	59.33	2	6.36	Independents
1931	90	11	43.54	79	54.88		1.58
1935	89	17	18.93	47	46.53	25	34.54	ALN

=== Post-1936 ===
Election	Total seats	Liberal		Union Nationale		Parti Québécois		CAQ / ADQ^{[I]}		Québec Solidaire		Other
Election	Total seats	Seats	Vote (%)	Seats	Vote (%)	Seats	Vote (%)	Seats	Vote (%)	Seats	Vote (%)	Seats	Vote (%)	Seat-winning party
1936	90	14	39.41	76	56.88							–	3.71
1939	86	70	54.05	15	39.13							1	6.81	Independent
1944	91	37	39.35	48	38.02							6	22.63	Bloc Populaire (4); CCF, Independent
1948	92	8	36.17	82	51.24							2	12.59	Independents
1952	92	23	45.77	68	50.50							1	3.72	Independent
1956	93	20	44.87	72	52.80							1	2.33	Independent
1960	95	51	51.38	43	46.61							1	2.01	Independent
1962	95	63	56.40	31	42.15							1	1.45	Independent
1966	108	50	47.29	56	40.82							2	11.89	Independents
1970	108	72	45.40	17	19.65	7	23.06					12	11.89	Créditistes
1973	110	102	54.65	–	4.92	6	30.22					2	10.21	Créditistes
1976	110	26	33.78	11	18.20	71	41.37					2	6.64	PNP, Créditistes
1981	122	42	46.08	–	4.00	80	49.20					–	0.71
1985	122	99	55.99	–	0.23	23	38.69					–	5.08
1989	125	92	49.95			29	40.16					4	9.89	Equality
1994^{[D]}	125	47	44.40			77	44.75	1	6.46			–	4.4
1998^{[C]}	125	48	43.55			76	42.87	1	11.81			–	1.8
2003^{[B]}	125	76	45.99			45	33.24	4	18.18			–	2.3
2007	125	48	33.08			36	28.35	41	30.84	–	3.64	–	4.1
2008	125	66	42.08			51	35.17	7	16.37	1	3.78	–	2.6
2012	125	50	31.20			54	31.95	19	27.05	2	6.03	–	3.7
2014	125	70	41.52			30	25.38	22	23.05	3	7.63	–	2.4
2018	125	31	24.76			10	17.09	74	37.47	10	16.06	–	1.68
2022	125	21	14.37			3	14.60	90	40.97	11	15.42	–	14.64
2026	127	39	24.23			60	28.02	0	13.35	9	12.42	19	20.66	Conservative

=== Notes ===
^{A} Includes all Independent Conservative candidates elected from 1875 to 1892.
^{B} Results include the by-election on 20 May 2003 in the Champlain electoral district to break a tie in the original general election.
^{C} Results include the by-election on 14 December 1998 in the Masson electoral district due to the death of PQ candidate Yves Blais on 22 November 1998.
^{D} Results include the by-election on 24 October 1994 in the Saint-Jean electoral district to break a tie in the original general election.
^{E} Includes Independent Liberal candidate; the 27 May 1912 election of Gustave Lemieux by acclamation in Gaspé; and the 15 July 1912 election of Joseph-Édouard Caron in the Îles-de-la-Madeleine.
^{F} Includes the Independent Liberal candidate elected.
^{G} Includes the Conservative candidate elected in the by-election held in Kamouraska on 11 February 1869.
^{H} Power went back and forth a few times after the 1878 election. For most of that legislature, the Liberals controlled a minority parliament with the support of some Conservative members.
^{I} The Action démocratique du Québec (ADQ) ran from 1994–2008. The Coalition avenir Québec (CAQ) was founded in 2011, merged with the ADQ (absorbing all of its sitting MNAs), and ran in its first election in 2012.

== Gallery ==
1973 Quebec general election

1976 Quebec general election

1981 Quebec general election

1985 Quebec general election

1989 Quebec general election

1994 Quebec general election

1998 Quebec general election

2003 Quebec general election

2007 Quebec general election

2008 Quebec general election

2012 Quebec general election

2014 Quebec general election

2018 Quebec general election

2022 Quebec general election

2026 Quebec general election
