= Luc Letellier de St-Just =

Canadian politician

The Honourable Luc Letellier de Saint-Just PC
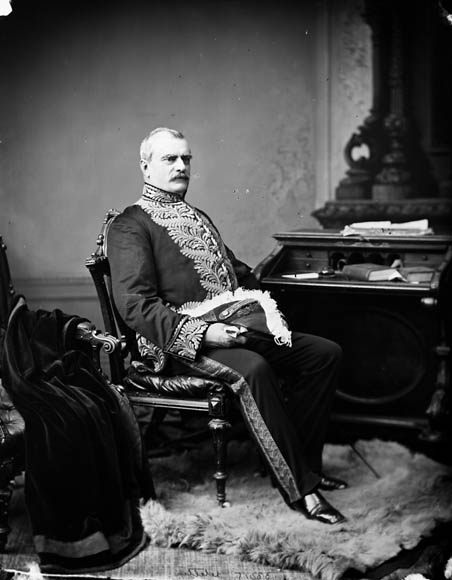

3rd Lieutenant Governor of Quebec
- In office December 15, 1876 – July 25, 1879
- Monarch: Victoria
- Governors General: The Earl of Dufferin; Marquess of Lorne
- Premier: Charles Boucher de Boucherville; Henri-Gustave Joly de Lotbinière
- Preceded by: René-Édouard Caron
- Succeeded by: Théodore Robitaille

Senator for Grandville, Quebec
- In office October 23, 1867 – December 14, 1876
- Appointed by: Royal Proclamation
- Succeeded by: Charles Alphonse Pantaléon Pelletier

Leader of the Government in the Senate
- In office November 5, 1873 – December 14, 1876
- Preceded by: Alexander Campbell
- Succeeded by: Sir Richard William Scott

Personal details
- Born: May 12, 1820 Rivière-Ouelle, Lower Canada
- Died: January 28, 1881 (aged 60) Rivière-Ouelle, Quebec
- Party: Nationalist Liberal

Luc Letellier de Saint-Just, PC (May 12, 1820 – January 28, 1881) was a Canadian politician. He also served as the third Lieutenant Governor of Quebec (1876–1879).

A notary by training, Letellier belonged to a prominent family that descended from Michel Letellier who, originally from Saint-Quentin, in the diocese of Noyon, migrated to New France around 1705 with his wife Marie Mélie. Their son, François Letellier de Saint-Just, born in Québec in 1709, became a soldier in Fouville's company and retired from the troops in October 1740, after marrying Marie-Françoise Pelletier in Québec on January 25, 1740. In February 1750, they had a son named Michel Tellier who, as a farmer, was a member of the House of Assembly of Lower Canada between 1800 and 1804. He and his wife Louise Moreau are the parents of François Letellier, notary, who married Marie-Sophie Casgrain, who are the parents of Luc Letellier de Saint-Just, who was a half-brother of Horace Bélanger.

In 1851, Luc Letellier was elected in a by-election to the Legislative Assembly of the Province of Canada as a supporter of Louis-Hippolyte Lafontaine. He was defeated in a general election a few months later by his rival Jean-Charles Chapais. In 1860, Letellier won election to the legislative council of the united province and, in 1863, he was appointed minister of agriculture in the Reform - rouge Cabinet of Joint Premiers John Sandfield Macdonald and Antoine-Aimé Dorion. The government fell the next year, however, in favour of a Tory – Parti bleu administration.

Letellier opposed Canadian Confederation prior to 1867, but accepted it once it became a reality. He was appointed by royal charter as a charter member of the Senate of Canada when it was created in 1867. He sat as a "Nationalist Liberal", and was Leader of the Opposition in the Senate from 1867 until the 1872 election when the Liberals took power under Alexander Mackenzie. Letellier became Leader of the Government in the Senate and Minister of Agriculture in Mackenzie's Cabinet. He had also attempted to concurrently win a seat in the Quebec legislative assembly, but was defeated in his attempts in 1869 and 1871 to win election.

In 1876, Mackenzie advised the Governor General of Canada to appoint Letellier to the position of lieutenant-governor of Quebec. As lieutenant governor, he dismissed the government of Conservative Quebec Premier Charles-Eugène Boucher de Boucherville on March 1, 1878, despite the fact that the government enjoyed a 20-seat majority in the Legislative Assembly and a two-to-one majority in the Legislative Council. Letellier justified the dismissal on charges that the government was acting incompetently and corruptly on the matter of railway legislation. He also argued that if the de Boucherville government had not made concessions to "rings" of interest within the legislature on the issue, it would have lost the legislature's support. De Boucherville called the move a "coup d'etat" and complained to the Governor General of Canada. Both houses of the legislature passed motions of censure against the lieutenant-governor.

When the federal Conservatives under Sir John A. Macdonald defeated the federal Liberals in the 1878 election, the new federal Cabinet tried to have Letellier dismissed as lieutenant-governor of Quebec. The Governor General, the Marquess of Lorne, referred the matter to the Colonial Secretary in London, who advised him to follow the advice of his ministers. Letellier was dismissed.
