= Property qualification =

Exclusion from voting rights on the basis of a lack of property

A property qualification is a clause or rule by which those without property (land), or those without property of a set appraised value, or those without income of a set value, are not enfranchised to vote in elections, to stand for election, to hold office or from other activities.

== United Kingdom ==
A property qualification originally barred most commoners from voting or standing for election to the House of Commons of England and Wales (after 1707, of the Kingdom of Great Britain and, after 1801, of the United Kingdom of Great Britain and Ireland). The Great Reform Bill of 1832 widened the franchise (immediately before this, only a small number of men, and even fewer women, could vote), although it would be 1918 before all men could vote (women would wait until 1928 in Great Britain, and until the 1970s in Northern Ireland). British nationals from the British Overseas Territories technically have the right to vote or stand for election but cannot do so unless they are resident in the United Kingdom, as no House of Commons electoral districts exist for any British Overseas Territory.

The 18th-century Militia of England and Wales did not sell commissions in the way that the British Army did at the time, but it instead restricted them to property owners and those with income of a set minimum value.

In jurisdictions where the political and economic spheres are dominated by one ethnic, religious or racial group, property qualifications have been used as a way to exclude members of other ethnic, religious or racial groups that may disproportionately lack the required resources. This was the case in Northern Ireland, where a property requirement was used to exclude indigenous Irish Catholics from voting in elections for seats in the Stormont Parliament until 1969. Prior to the 1921 Partition of Ireland, the Protestant Ascendancy had similarly barred most of the native Irish Catholics from voting for Irish seats in the Parliament of the United Kingdom of Great Britain and Ireland once the last bar to Catholics voting in the United Kingdom had been lifted by the Roman Catholic Relief Act 1829. The property qualification remained in place for mainland United Kingdom elections until the passage of the Representation of the People Act 1918.

== United States of America ==
In the 18th-century Thirteen Colonies, suffrage was restricted to males with the following property qualifications:

- Connecticut: an estate worth 40 shillings annually or £40 of personal property
- Delaware: fifty acres of land (twelve under cultivation) or £40 of personal property
- Georgia: fifty acres of land
- Maryland: fifty acres of land and £40 personal property
- Massachusetts Bay: an estate worth 40 shillings annually or £40 of personal property
- New Hampshire: £50 of personal property
- New Jersey: one-hundred acres of land, or real estate or personal property £50
- New York: £40 of personal property or ownership of land
- North Carolina: fifty acres of land
- Pennsylvania: fifty acres of land or £50 of personal property
- Rhode Island and Providence Plantations: personal property worth £40 or yielding 50 shillings annually
- South Carolina: one-hundred acres of land on which taxes were paid; or a town house or lot worth £60 on which taxes were paid; or payment of 10 shillings in taxes
- Virginia: fifty acres of vacant land, twenty-five acres of cultivated land, and a house twelve feet by twelve feet; or a town lot and a house twelve feet by twelve

Beginning around 1790, individual states began to reassess property ownership as a qualification for enfranchisement. In the early 1800s, many states removed their property requirements for voting, while at the same time several states disenfranchised women and free African-Americans.

By 1840, North Carolina, Rhode Island, and Virginia were the only states that still had property requirements to vote. The property requirement in Rhode Island led to the Dorr Rebellion, essentially an intra-state civil war. In 1856, North Carolina was the final state to remove the property requirement for voting, although requirements for paying tax remained in five states.

== See also ==
- Timocracy
- Forty-shilling freeholders
- Plutocracy
