= Jacques-Cartier County, Quebec =

Jacques-Cartier County Comté de Jacques-Cartier
- County
- Interactive map of Jacques-Cartier County
- Coordinates: 45°30′N 73°50′W
- Country: Canada
- Province: Quebec

Jacques-Cartier County (French: Comté de Jacques-Cartier, pronounced [kɔ̃te də ʒak kaʁtje]) was an historic county on the Island of Montreal in the province of Quebec. It existed between 1855 and 1970.
