= Charles Boucher de Boucherville =

3rd Premier of Quebec (1822–1915)

Senator the Honorable Sir Charles Boucher de Boucherville KCMG
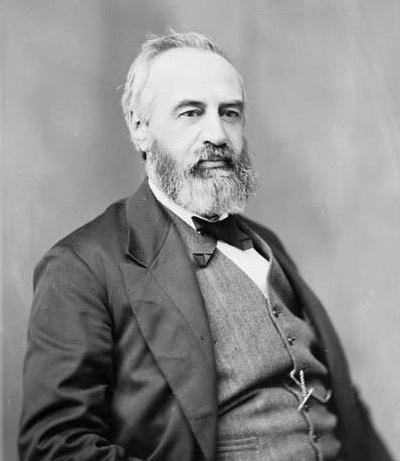
- Boucher de Boucherville in 1879

3rd Premier of Quebec
- In office September 22, 1874 – March 8, 1878
- Monarch: Victoria
- Lieutenant Governor: René-Édouard Caron; Luc Letellier de St.-Just
- Preceded by: Gédéon Ouimet
- Succeeded by: Henri-Gustave Joly de Lotbinière
- In office December 21, 1891 – December 16, 1892
- Monarch: Victoria
- Lieutenant Governor: Auguste-Réal Angers; Joseph-Adolphe Chapleau
- Preceded by: Honoré Mercier
- Succeeded by: Louis-Olivier Taillon

Senator for Montarville, Quebec
- In office February 12, 1879 – September 10, 1915
- Appointed by: John A. Macdonald
- Preceded by: Louis Lacoste
- Succeeded by: Charles-Philippe Beaubien

Member of Legislative Council for Montarville
- In office July 1, 1867 – September 10, 1915
- Appointed by: Narcisse Fortunat Belleau

Personal details
- Born: Charles-Eugène-Napoléon Boucher de Boucherville; May 4, 1822 Montreal, Lower Canada
- Died: September 10, 1915 (aged 93) Montreal, Quebec
- Party: Conservative Party of Quebec
- Other political affiliations: Conservative Party of Canada
- Spouse(s): Susan Elizabeth Morrogh; Marie-Céleste-Esther Lussier

Sir Charles-Eugène-Napoléon Boucher de Boucherville KCMG (May 4, 1822 – September 10, 1915) was a Canadian politician and medical doctor. He twice served as the premier of Quebec.

== Personal life ==
Charles-Eugène-Napoléon Boucher de Boucherville was born in Montreal, Quebec, Canada. Descended from Pierre Boucher, he was one of the three children of Pierre Boucher de Boucherville (1780–1857), Seigneur of Boucherville, and Marguerite-Émilie de Bleury (1786–1812), sister of Clément-Charles Sabrevois de Bleury. Boucher de Boucherville studied medicine at McGill University, graduating with MD in 1843.

== Political career ==
During the Chauveau administration, he served as Speaker of the Legislative Council. He became premier in 1874 when his predecessor, Gédéon Ouimet, had to resign due to a financial scandal. He then won the 1875 Quebec election but was removed from office on March 8, 1878, in a conflict with Lieutenant Governor Luc Letellier de Saint-Just. Letellier de Saint-Just refused to approve legislation that had been passed by both houses of the Quebec legislature that would have forced municipalities to pay for railway construction. The Lieutenant-Governor deposed Boucher de Boucherville, and called on the Leader of the Opposition, Henri-Gustave Joly de Lotbinière, to form a government.

Boucher de Boucherville's second term came about after Honoré Mercier was removed from office by Lieutenant Governor Auguste-Réal Angers on December 16, 1891, on charges of corruption. Mercier was later cleared.

After Conservative leader Louis-Olivier Taillon had lost the 1890 election and his own seat, Jean Blanchet had taken over as Leader of the Opposition to the Mercier government. Blanchet, however, had resigned on September 19, 1891, to accept an appointment as a judge. The Lieutenant Governor, therefore, needed a Conservative to fill the post of Premier and turned to Boucher de Boucherville.

Boucher de Boucherville served for one year but resigned when former Conservative premier Joseph-Adolphe Chapleau was appointed Lieutenant-Governor in December 1892. Relations between the two may have been strained. By 1915 the oldest legislator in North America, he died that year in Montreal at the Deaf and Dumb Institute, in whose work he was so interested that he lived there.

== See also ==
- Politics of Quebec
- List of Quebec general elections
- Timeline of Quebec history

== External links and references ==
- Munro, Kenneth (1998). "Boucher de Boucherville, Sir Charles". In Cook, Ramsay; Hamelin, Jean (eds.). Dictionary of Canadian Biography. Vol. XIV (1911–1920) (online ed.). University of Toronto Press.
- "Biography". Dictionnaire des parlementaires du Québec de 1792 à nos jours (in French). National Assembly of Quebec.
- Charles Boucher de Boucherville – Parliament of Canada biography
- "Senator de Boucherville Dies at 95". The New York Times. September 12, 1915. p. 17.

Political offices
Preceded by Louis Lacoste (Parti bleu)	MLA, District of Chambly; 1861–1867	Succeeded by New constitution enacted in 1867
National Assembly of Quebec
Preceded by Position created in 1867	Legislative Councillor, District of Montarville; 1867–1915	Succeeded by Joseph-Léonide Perron (Liberal)
