= Legislative Council of Quebec =

Former upper house of the Quebec Legislature

Legislative Council of Quebec Conseil législatif du Québec

Type
- Type: Upper house of the Quebec Legislature
- Term limits: Life appointments

History
- Founded: July 1, 1867
- Disbanded: December 31, 1968
- Preceded by: Legislative Council of the Province of Canada
- Succeeded by: none
- Seats: 24

Meeting place
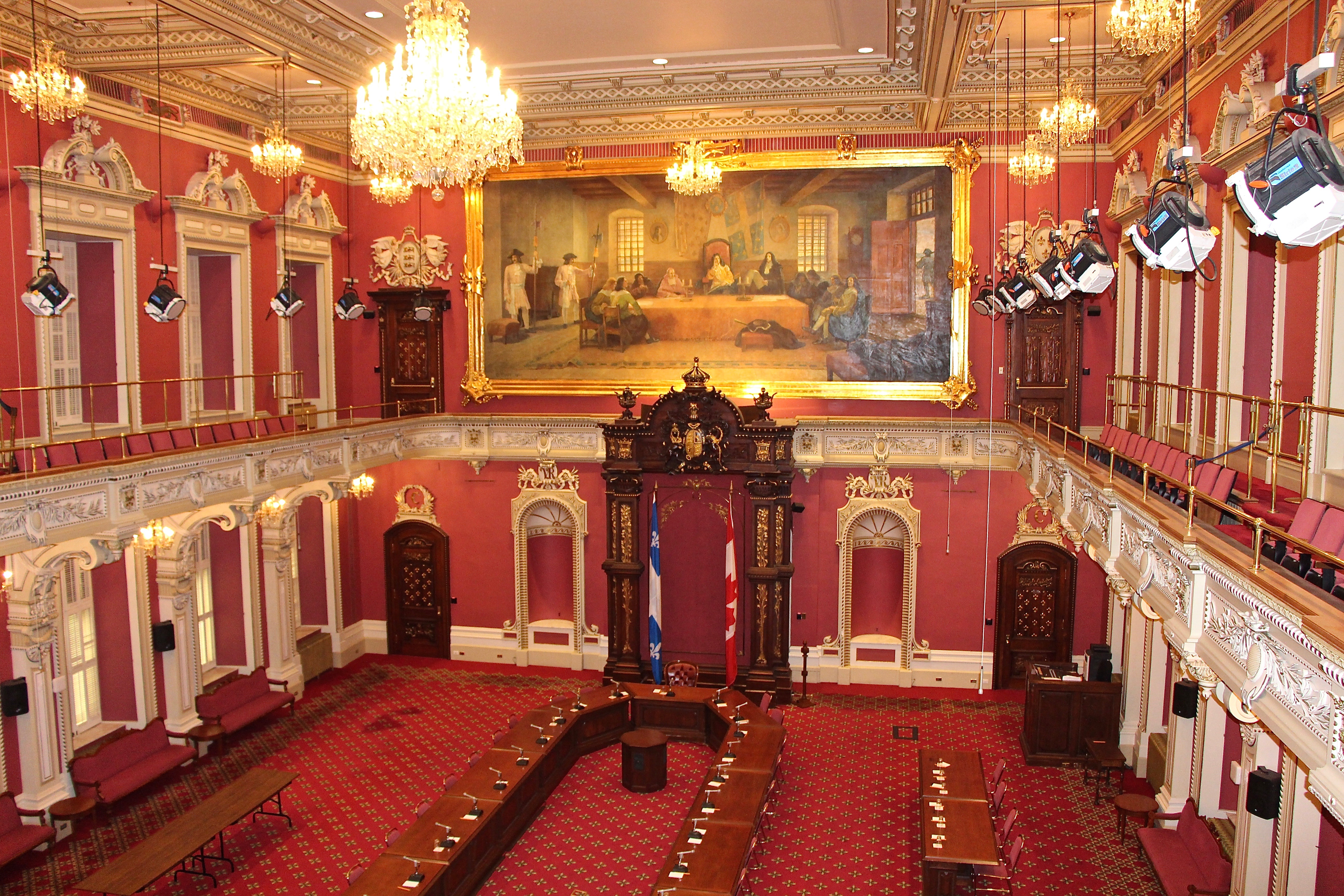
- The Red Chamber, former chamber of the Legislative Council

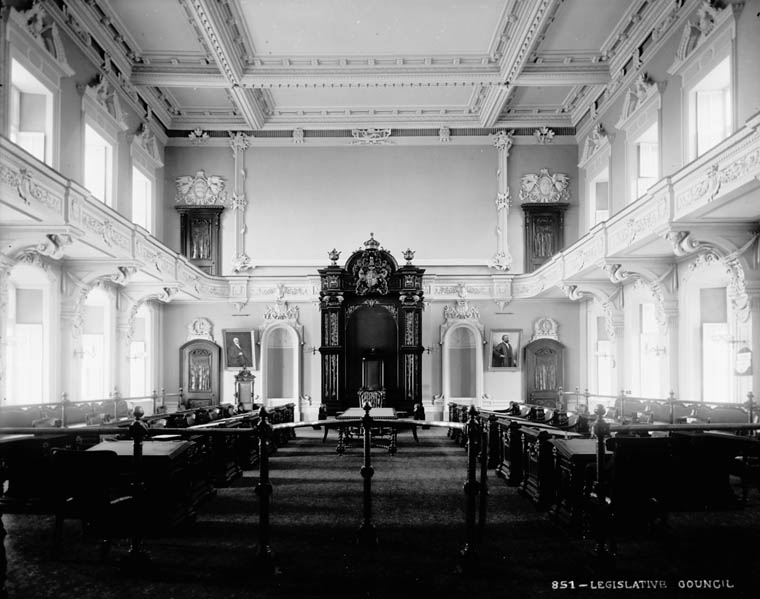
The chamber of the Legislative Council of Quebec before its abolition

The Legislative Council of Quebec (French: Conseil législatif du Québec, pronounced [kɔ̃sɛj leʒislatif dy kebɛk]) was the unelected upper house of the bicameral legislature in the Canadian province of Quebec from 1867 to 1968. The Legislative Assembly was the elected lower house.

The council was composed of 24 members, appointed by the lieutenant governor upon the recommendation of the premier. Each councillor nominally represented a portion of the Province of Quebec called a division. The boundaries of these divisions were identical to the ones used for Canada East by the Legislative Council of the Province of Canada and were also identical to the boundaries still used today by the Senate of Canada for Quebec. The division boundaries were never changed to accommodate territorial expansions of Quebec in 1898 and 1912.

The Legislative Council was abolished in 1968 and the Legislative Assembly was renamed the National Assembly of Quebec. Since the abolition, Quebec has a unicameral legislature.

== Powers of the Legislative Council ==
The council had the right to introduce bills, except of a financial nature, and to amend or reject bills passed by the Legislative Assembly. Its speaker, known in French as orateur, was by right a member of the Cabinet, and its members could serve as ministers or even premier. Two Quebec premiers, Charles-Eugène Boucher de Boucherville and John Jones Ross, were members of the Legislative Council.

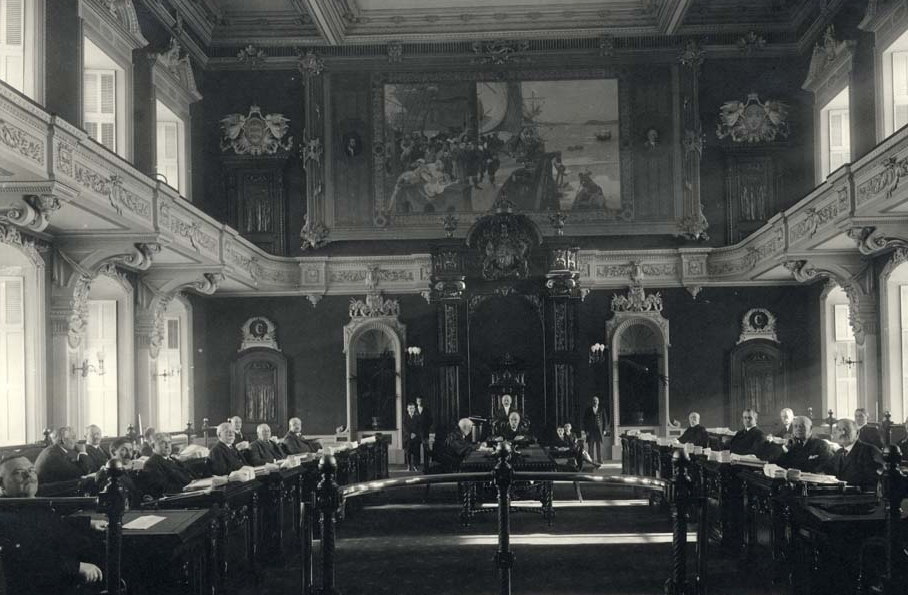
The chamber of the Legislative Council of Quebec in session, 1924

== Appointment of members of the Legislative Council ==
Members were originally appointed for life. In 1963, the rule was changed to force members to retire at age 75, but that did not apply to members who had already been appointed. In the event, the change remained entirely theoretical since the council was abolished before it could be applied to anyone.

== Abolition of the Legislative Council ==
Effective December 31, 1968 the Legislative Council was abolished, and the Legislative Assembly of Quebec was renamed the National Assembly. As a consequence, Quebec now has a unicameral legislature. The establishment of the original system dates back to the Constitutional Act of 1791.

The Union Nationale government of Premier Jean-Jacques Bertrand passed the legislation, known as "Bill 90", to implement the change. Previous governments had made unsuccessful attempts to eliminate the upper chamber. In fact, the first attempt dated all the way back to Félix-Gabriel Marchand, in the late 19th century. Quebec was the last Canadian province to abolish its upper house.

When it was dissolved, it had 15 members of the Union Nationale and 9 Liberal Party members.

== The Red Chamber ==
The large chamber that housed the Legislative Council is also known in French as le salon rouge (the red hall) and in English as "the Red Room" because of the predominance of the colour on the walls. It is now used for committee meetings and for important state functions that require a large, impressive hall, such as inductions into the National Order of Quebec.

== Speakers of the Legislative Council of Quebec (1867–1968) ==
The Speaker of the Legislative Council (in French, the Orateur) was appointed by the government. Most Speakers sat in the Cabinet. The Speaker was the presiding officer of the Legislative Council, but could vote like other members. In the event of a tie, the Speaker did not have a casting vote. The motion simply failed.

Speakers of the Legislative Council of Quebec
Portrait	Name	Appointment	Ending	Political party
	Charles-Eugène Boucher de Boucherville	July 15, 1867	February 27, 1873	Conservative
	John Jones Ross	February 27, 1873	September 22, 1874	Conservative
	Félix-Hyacinthe Lemaire	September 22, 1874	January 27, 1876	Conservative
	John Jones Ross	January 22, 1876	March 8, 1878	Conservative
	Henry Starnes	March 8, 1878	October 31, 1879	Liberal
	John Jones Ross	October 31, 1879	March 4, 1882	Conservative
	Pierre Boucher de la Bruère	March 4, 1882	April 23, 1889	Conservative
	Henry Starnes	April 23, 1889	March 17, 1892	Liberal
	Pierre Boucher de la Bruère	March 17, 1892	April 5, 1895	Conservative
	Thomas Chapais	April 5, 1895	January 12, 1897	Conservative
	Vildebon-Winceslas Larue	January 12, 1897	June 17, 1897	Conservative
	Horace Archambeault	June 17, 1897	September 15, 1908	Liberal
	Adélard Turgeon	February 2, 1909	November 14, 1930	Liberal
	Jacob Nicol	November 25, 1930	July 25, 1934	Libéral
	Hector Laferté	July 27, 1934	October 2, 1936	Liberal
	Alphonse Raymond	October 2, 1936	January 17, 1940	Union Nationale
	Hector Laferté	January 17, 1940	December 31, 1944	Libéral
	Alphonse Raymond	December 31, 1944	February 1, 1950	Union Nationale
	Jean-Louis Baribeau	February 1, 1950	July 6, 1960	Union Nationale
	Hector Laferté	July 6, 1960	June 23, 1966	Liberal
	Jean-Louis Baribeau	June 23, 1966	December 31, 1968	Union Nationale

== Legislative Council divisions ==
Map of the Legislative Council divisions

The twenty-four members of the Legislative Council were each appointed to represent a division of Quebec. The divisions were originally defined by statute for the Legislative Council of the Province of Canada in 1856, when elected members were included in the Legislative Council. The statutory descriptions of the divisions were then incorporated into the Consolidated Statutes of Canada, 1859. In 1867, the British North America Act, 1867 simply adopted the existing twenty-four divisions for the new Legislative Council of Quebec, although the new Council was appointed, rather than elected.

Although the boundaries of Quebec were extended northwards twice, in 1898 and again in 1912, the boundaries of the Legislative Council divisions were never altered.

=== Alma ===
The Alma division was defined as: "The Parishes of Long Point, Pointe-aux-Trembles, Rivière des Prairies, Sault aux Récollets, in the county of Hochelaga, and that part of the Parish of Montreal which lies to the East of the prolongation of St. Denis Street; the County of Laval, that part of the City of Montreal which lies to the East of Bonsécours and St. Denis Streets, and their prolongation."

=== Bedford ===
The Bedford division was defined as: "The Counties of Missisquoi, Brome, and Shefford."

=== De la Durantaye ===
The De la Durantaye division was defined as "The remainder of the County of L'Islet, the countie[s] of Montmagny and Bellechasse and the Parishes of St. Joseph, St. Henri and Notre Dame de la Victoire, in the County of Lévi." (See the description of the Grandville division for the explanation of the "remainder of the County of L'Islet".)

=== De la Vallière ===
The De la Vallière division was defined as: "The Counties of Nicolet and Yamaska, the Townships of Wendover, Grantham, and the part of Upton which lies in the County of Drummond."

=== De Lanaudière ===
The De Lanaudière division was defined as "The remainder of the County of Maskinongé, the Counties of Berthier and Joliette, with the exception of the Parish of St. Paul, the Township of Kildare and its augmentation, and the Township of Cathcart". (See the description of the Shawinigan division for the explanation of the "remainder of the County of Maskingongé".)

=== De Lorimier ===
The De Lorimier division was defined as: "The Counties of St. John and Napierville; St. Jean Chrysostôme and Russeltown in the County of Chateauguay; Hemmingford in the County of Huntingdon."

=== De Salaberry ===
The De Salaberry division was defined as: "The remainder of the County of Chateauguay, the remainder of the County of Huntingdon, and the County of Beauharnois." (See the description of the De Lorimier division for the explanation of the parishes which were excluded from the De Salaberry division.)

=== Grandville ===
The Grandville division was defined as: "The Counties of Temiscouata and Kamouraska, the Parishes of St. Roch des Aulnets and St. Jean Port Joli, and the prolongation thereof in a straight line to the Province Line in the County of L'Islet."

=== Gulf ===
The Gulf division was defined as: "The Counties of Gaspé, Bonaventure and Rimouski."

=== Inkerman ===
The Inkerman division was defined as: "The Counties of Argenteuil, Ottawa and Pontiac."

=== Kennebec ===
The Kennebec division was defined as: "The Counties of Lotbinière, Mégantic and Arthabaska."

=== La Salle ===
The La Salle division was defined as: "The remainder of the County of Quebec, the County of Portneuf, and all that part of the Banlieue of Quebec which lies within the Parish of Notre Dame de Québec." (See the description of The Laurentides division for the explanation of the "remainder of the County of Quebec".)

=== Lauzon ===
The Lauzon division was defined as: "The remainder of the County of Lévi, the Counties of Dorchester and Beauce." (See the description of the De la Durantaye division for the explanation of the "remainder of the County of L'Islet".)

=== Mille Isles ===
The Mille Isles division was defined as: "The Counties of Terrebonne and Two Mountains."

=== Montarville ===
The Montarville division was defined as: "The Counties of Verchères, Chambly and Laprairie."

=== Repentigny ===
The Repentigny division was defined as: "The Parish of St. Paul, the Township of Kildare and its augmentation, and the Township of Cathcart, in the County of Joliette, the Counties of L'Assomption and Montcalm".

=== Rigaud ===
The Rigaud division was defined as: "The remainder of the Parish of Montreal, and the Counties of Jacques Cartier, Vaudreuil and Solanges." (See the description of the Alma division for the explanation of the "remainder of the Parish of Montreal".)

=== Rougemont ===
The Rougemont division was defined as "The remainder of the County of St. Hyacinth, the Counties of Rouville and Iberville." (See the description of the Saurel division for the explanation of "the remainder of the County of St. Hyacinth".)

=== Saurel ===
The Saurel division was defined as "The Counties of Richelieu and Bagot, the Parishes of St. Denis, La Présentation, St. Barnabé, and St. Jude, in the County of St. Hyacinth."

=== Shawinigan ===
The Shawinigan division was defined as "The Counties of Champlain and St. Maurice, the Town of Three Rivers, the Parishes of River du Loup, St. Léon, St. Paulin, and the Township of Hunterstown and its augmentation, in the County of Maskinongé."

=== Stadacona ===
The Stadacona division was defined as "The remainder of the City and Banlieue of Quebec." (See the description of the La Salle division for the explanation of "remainder of the City...of Quebec".)

=== The Laurentides ===
The Laurentides division was defined as: "The Counties of Chicoutimi, Charlevoix, Saguenay and Montmorency, the Seigniory of Beauport, the Parish of Charlebourg, the Townships of Stoneham and Tewkesbury, in the County of Quebec."

=== Victoria ===
The Victoria division was defined as: "The remainder of the City of Montreal exclusive of the Parish." (See the description of the Alma division for the explanation of the "remainder of the City of Montreal".)

=== Wellington ===
The Wellington division was defined as: "The remainder of the County of Drummond, the County of Richmond, the Town of Sherbrooke, the Counties of Wolfe, Compton, and Stanstead." (See the description of the De la Vallière division for the explanation of the "remainder of the County of Drummond".)

== See also ==
- Legislative Council of Lower Canada
- Legislative Council of the Province of Canada
