= Conservative Party of Quebec (historical) =

Conservative Party of Quebec Parti conservateur du Québec
- Founded: 1867; 159 years ago
- Dissolved: 1936; 90 years ago
- Preceded by: Parti bleu
- Merged into: Union Nationale
- Ideology: Conservatism; Ultramontanism
- Political position: Right-wing
- Religion: Catholic

The Conservative Party of Quebec (French: Parti conservateur du Québec) was a political party in Quebec, Canada, from 1867 until 1936, when it merged with members of the Action libérale nationale to form the Union Nationale.

== Origins ==
The party originated as the Parti bleu which was formed around 1850. The parti bleu opposed the anti-clericalism of its rival, the parti rouge.

The parti bleu supported the role of the clergy in Quebec society. Members of the parti bleu, led by George-Étienne Cartier from Canada East, joined with the followers of Sir John A. Macdonald in Canada West to form a coalition government with Cartier as co-premier from 1857 to 1862. It was out of this coalition that the Conservative Party was formed (then known as the Liberal-Conservative Party), laying the basis for Confederation in 1867.

== Post-Confederation ==
With Confederation and Quebec's entry as a province, what had been the parti bleu became the Quebec wing of Macdonald's Conservative Party. It formed the government in the province, with Pierre-Joseph-Olivier Chauveau as Quebec's first premier. Cartier acted as Macdonald's Quebec lieutenant in the federal House of Commons. The Conservatives dominated Quebec politics at both the federal and provincial level for the next 30 years. The Conservatives held power in Quebec for 25 out of 30 years, providing eight of the province's ten premiers in that period.

However, the party became increasingly divided between a moderate wing and an Ultramontane wing of Catholic fundamentalists. As well, the party's links with the federal Conservatives harmed the party as the Tories in English Canada became increasingly identified as hostile to French Canadians and Quebec. The execution of Louis Riel in 1885 outraged French Canadians and hurt the Macdonald Conservatives at the polls.

After Macdonald's death in 1891, the coalition that formed the national Conservatives unravelled, particularly around the Manitoba Schools Question that pitted English-Canadian Protestants against French-Canadian Catholics. This issue essentially ended the possibility of a significant French-Canadian presence in western Canada.

The federal Conservatives lost the 1896 federal election, largely due to the collapse of their support in Quebec. The provincial Conservative government of Edmund James Flynn lost the 1897 Quebec election.

With the defeats of 1896 and 1897, the Conservatives became a minority party in Quebec at both levels of government. The Conservative Party of Quebec never formed another provincial government. The Quebec Liberal Party held power without interruption for the next 38 years.

== Decline and re-emergence as Union Nationale ==
Conservative fortunes were further hurt by the Conscription Crisis of 1917 when the federal Conservative government of Sir Robert Borden invoked conscription against the opposition of Quebec. This led to riots in the province.

In 1929, mayor of Montreal Camillien Houde succeeded Arthur Sauvé as leader of the Conservative Party, which went on to lose four by-elections.

In 1933, Maurice Duplessis became leader of the Quebec Conservatives. The next year, the ruling Liberal party split when a group of nationalist Liberals dissatisfied with the government of Louis-Alexandre Taschereau bolted from the party to form the Action libérale nationale or ALN. Duplessis wooed the dissident party and, two weeks before the 1935 election, the Conservatives and ALN formed a "Union Nationale" alliance to contest the election. On June 20, 1936, the Quebec Conservative Party dissolved when the alliance became a formal merger into a single political party, the Union Nationale.

Two months later, the UN took power in the 1936 election under the leadership of Duplessis. The party was unexpectedly defeated in 1939, but went on to dominate Quebec politics from 1944 until Duplessis died in 1959.

The Union Nationale formed the government again from 1966–1970 and afterwards went into rapid decline, being supplanted by the Parti Québécois as the main opposition to the Liberals.

== Federal Tories and Quebec after the Union Nationale ==
Since the late 1960s, the main divide in Quebec politics was between supporters of Quebec separatism and federalism, rather than the traditional conservatism and liberalism. This resulted in a reorientation of Quebec politics with the conservative Union Nationale collapsing in the early 1970s and the new polarization in Quebec politics being between the separatist Parti Québécois and the federalist Quebec Liberal Party.

Federalists, whether conservative or liberal, generally supported the Liberals with federalist former Union Nationale members joining that party in the 1970s while more nationalist UN members joined the PQ. This reorientation could be seen in the family of former Union Nationale premier Daniel Johnson, Sr. whose son, Daniel Johnson, Jr. joined and eventually became leader of the Quebec Liberals while his brother, Pierre-Marc Johnson, joined and eventually led the PQ.

Claude Wagner, a judge and a prominent Quebec Liberal cabinet minister who departed provincial politics in 1970, ran successfully as a Progressive Conservative in the 1972 federal election, and was the front-runner in the party leadership convention in 1976 before losing on the final ballot to Joe Clark. When Bourassa returned to politics in the 1980s, he worked closely with the federal Progressive Conservatives led by Brian Mulroney. During that decade, the Liberals won the majority of Quebec's seats in 1985 and 1989, while the PCs did so at the federal level in 1984 and 1988. Some Quebec Progressive Conservatives attempted to form a provincial party, the Progressive Conservative Party of Quebec, in the 1980s but this effort was not supported by the federal party and failed to win any seats.

In 1998, federal PC leader Jean Charest moved to provincial politics as the leader of the Quebec Liberals.

With the decline of support for separatism in the early twenty-first century, there are indications that Quebec politics is returning to a right/left divide, and there have been several attempts to create centre-right parties, with varying success. The Action démocratique du Québec was formed in 1994 and attracted support from a number of federal Conservatives due to its neoliberal economic program and populist conservative social positions.

In the years following the ADQ's collapse after the 2008 Quebec election, a new nationalist party was formed, the Coalition Avenir Québec, which absorbed the ADQ in 2012. The CAQ formed government from 2018 to 2026.

In 2009, Conservative federalists in Quebec created a new party, which gained representation in the National Assembly in the 2026 Quebec general election.

== Leaders of the Parti conservateur du Québec ==
- Pierre-Joseph-Olivier Chauveau 1867-1873 (Premier 1867–1873)
- Gédéon Ouimet 1873-1874 (Premier 1873–1874)
- Charles-Eugène Boucher de Boucherville 1874-1878 (Premier 1874–1878, 1891–1892)
- Joseph-Adolphe Chapleau 1878-1882 (Premier 1879–1882)
- Joseph-Alfred Mousseau 1882-1884 (Premier 1882–1884)
- John Jones Ross 1884-1887 (Premier 1884–1887)
- Louis-Olivier Taillon 1887-1896 (Premier 1887, 1892–1896)
- Edmund James Flynn 1896-1904 (Premier 1896–1897)
- Pierre-Évariste Leblanc 1904–1908
- Joseph-Mathias Tellier 1908–1915
- Philémon Cousineau 1915–1916
- Arthur Sauvé 1916–1929
- Camillien Houde 1929–1932
- Charles Ernest Gault 1932-1933 (acting)
- Maurice Duplessis 1933-1936 (later, Premier as leader of Union Nationale)

== Election results ==
| General election | # of candidates | # of seats won | % of popular vote |
|---|---|---|---|
| 1867 | 69 | 51 | 53.48% |
| 1871 | 67 | 46 | 51.72% |
| 1875 | 68 | 43 | 50.67% |
| 1878 | 66 | 32 | 49.49% |
| 1881 | 62 | 49 | 50.38% |
| 1886 | 63 | 26 | 46.19% |
| 1890 | 62 | 23 | 45.39% |
| 1892 | 71 | 51 | 52.41% |
| 1897 | 67 | 23 | 43.82% |
| 1900 | 34 | 7 | 41.85% |
| 1904 | 24 | 7 | 26.73% |
| 1908 | 62 | 14 | 39.92% |
| 1912 | 75 | 16 | 43.01% |
| 1916 | 55 | 6 | 35.09% |
| 1919 | 22 | 5 | 16.96% |
| 1923 | 71 | 20 | 39.32% |
| 1927 | 69 | 9 | 34.31% |
| 1931 | 89 | 11 | 43.54% |
| 1935 | 34 | 17 | 18.93% |
| 1939 | 3 | 0 | 0.3% |

== See also ==
- Progressive Conservative Party of Quebec, an attempt to revive the party in the 1980s
- Conservative Party of Quebec (2009—present), the current revival
- Union Nationale
- Politics of Quebec
- List of Quebec premiers
- List of Quebec leaders of the Opposition
- List of Quebec general elections
- National Assembly of Quebec
- Timeline of Quebec history
- Political parties in Quebec
- List of elections in the Province of Canada
