= 2nd Quebec Legislature =

Legislature of Quebec Législature du Québec
- Second Legislature, 1871 - 1875

Type
- Type: Bicameral
- Houses: Legislative Council; Legislative Assembly
- Term limits: Four years, subject to earlier dissolution.

History
- Founded: July 1, 1867
- Preceded by: First Legislature of Quebec, 1867-1871
- Succeeded by: Third Legislature of Quebec, 1875-1878

Leadership
- Monarch: Victoria
- Lieutenant Governor: Narcisse-Fortunat Belleau (1867-1873); René-Édouard Caron (1873-1876)
- Premier: Pierre-Joseph-Olivier Chauveau (1871-1873); Gédéon Ouimet (1873-1874); Charles Boucher de Boucherville (1874-1878), Conservative
- Speaker of the Legislative Council: Charles Boucher de Boucherville (1867-1873); John Jones Ross (1873-1874); Félix-Hyacinthe Lemaire (1874-1876), Conservative
- Speaker of the Legislative Assembly: Joseph-Goderic Blanchet, Conservative
- Leader of the Opposition: Henri-Gustave Joly de Lotbinière, Liberal

Structure
- Seats: Legislative Council: 24; Legislative Assembly: 65
- Legislative Council political groups: Conservatives 21; Liberals 3
- Legislative Assembly political groups: Conservatives 46; Liberals 19

Elections
- Legislative Council voting system: Life appointments
- Legislative Assembly voting system: Single member constituencies First-past-the-post voting Open ballot system Adult male franchise with property qualification

Constitution
- British North America Act, 1867

The Second Legislature of Quebec was the provincial legislature of Quebec, Canada from 1871 to 1875, following the general election of 1871.

The Conservative Party of Quebec held office throughout the term of the legislature, but went through a succession of three leaders. Pierre-Joseph-Olivier Chauveau was Premier of Quebec from 1871 to 1873. Gédéon Ouimet was premier from 1873 to 1874, and Charles Boucher de Boucherville was premier from 1874 to 1875.

The Liberal Party of Quebec formed the Official Opposition, under the leadership of Henri-Gustave Joly de Lotbinière.

The legislature held four annual sessions, with the first session called on November 7, 1871. The legislature was dissolved on June 7, 1875, leading to the 1875 general election on July 7, 1875.

== Structure of the legislature ==
The Legislature of Quebec was created by the British North America Act, 1867. It consisted of the Lieutenant Governor of Quebec, the Legislative Assembly and the Legislative Council. The Lieutenant Governor was appointed by the Governor General of Canada for a term of five years. The Legislative Assembly consisted of sixty-five members, elected in single-member constituencies by first-past-the-post elections. The Legislative Assembly was to last for four years, subject to being dissolved earlier by the Lieutenant Governor. The Legislative Council consisted of twenty-four members, appointed for life by the Government of Quebec.

The elections for the Second Legislature were conducted under the election law of the former Province of Canada, which were continued until such time as the Legislature of Quebec enacted a new election law, designed specifically for Quebec.

== Elections and qualifications ==
=== Right to vote ===
The right to vote in elections to the Legislative Assembly was not universal. Only male British subjects (by birth or naturalisation), aged 21 and older, were eligible to vote, and only if they met a property qualification. For residents of cities and towns, the qualification was being the owner, tenant or occupant of real property assessed at three hundred dollars, or at an assessed yearly value of thirty dollars. For residents of townships and parishes, the requirements were either an assessment of two hundred dollars, or an assessed yearly value of twenty dollars.

Women were expressly prohibited from voting, "for any Electoral Division whatever".

Judges and many municipal and provincial officials were also barred from voting, particularly officials with duties relating to public revenue. Election officials were also barred from voting.

Voting at elections was done by open ballotting, where voters publicly declared their vote to the poll officials.

=== Qualification for the Legislative Assembly ===
Candidates for the Legislative Assembly had to meet a significant property qualification. A candidate had to own real property in the Province of Canada, worth at least £500 in British sterling, over and above any encumbrances on the property.

=== Qualification for the Legislative Council ===
The qualifications for the members of the Legislative Council were the same as for the members of the Senate of Canada.

Those requirements were:

1. Be of the full age of thirty years;
2. Be a British subject, either natural-born or naturalised;
3. Possess real property in Quebec worth at least $4,000, over and above any debts or incumbrances on the property;
4. Have a net worth of at least $4,000, over and above debts and liabilities;
5. Reside in Quebec;
6. Reside in, or possess his qualifying real property, in the division he was named to represent.

The provisions of the British North America Act, 1867 did not explicitly bar women from being called to the Senate of Canada. However, until the Persons Case in 1929, it was assumed that women could not be called to the Senate, and were thus also barred from the Legislative Council. In any event, no woman was ever appointed to the Legislative Council.

== Events of the Second Legislature ==
The Conservatives under Premier Pierre-Joseph-Olivier Chauveau won a substantial majority in the 1871 election, although with a somewhat reduced seat count. In spite of their electoral success, the Conservatives began to fracture between an ultramontane Catholic wing and the traditional Parti Bleu supporters, who were more business oriented. Chauveau continued in office until 1873, when he resigned upon being appointed to the Senate of Canada.

Chauveau was succeeded as Conservative leader and Premier by Gédéon Ouimet, who had been elected to the Legislative Assembly in 1867 and served in Chauveau's Cabinet as Attorney General. Shortly into Ouimet's term a major political scandal broke, the Tanneries scandal, which turned on a land transaction carried out by the government. Ouimet and three other members of the Cabinet resigned.

Ouimet was replaced as party leader and premier by Charles Boucher de Boucherville in 1874. De Boucherville replaced almost the entire Cabinet.

In addition to the political instability associated with the Tanneries scandal, the Second Legislature was also marked by a high number of by-elections. Over the course of four years, there were twenty-four by-elections in the sixty-five seat Legislative Assembly. Most of the by-elections were triggered by the 1874 federal election, the first federal election after the abolition of the dual mandate, which had allowed individuals to hold seats in both the federal Parliament and the provincial Assembly. Several members of the Legislative Assembly resigned their provincial seats to run federally. Amongst those who moved to federal politics was the young Wilfrid Laurier, who had been elected to the Legislative Assembly in 1871 for the riding of Drummond et Arthabaska. A number of other by-elections were triggered by the changes to the provincial Cabinet under the three premiers. At that time, a member of the Assembly who was brought into Cabinet part-way through the term of the Assembly had to resign and stand for re-election.

One significant legislative measure passed by the de Boucherville government was electoral reform. The general elections of 1867 and 1871 had been conducted under the electoral laws of the former Province of Canada. In the 1875 session, the government passed a new election law to replace the old statute and create an electoral framework designed solely for Quebec. One of the key changes was that the new elections law introduced the secret ballot in Quebec elections, replacing the old open ballot system which had previously been used, and which had required voters to publicly declare their vote to the polling officials.

In 1875, Premier De Boucherville called a general election. The Conservatives were returned to office, albeit with a somewhat reduced majority.

== Legislative Assembly ==
=== Party standings ===
The 1871 election returned a majority in the Legislative Assembly for the Conservative Party, led by Premier Chauveau.

1871 Election Results
Party	Members
Conservatives	46
Liberals	19
Total	65
Government Majority	27

=== Members of the Legislative Assembly ===
The following candidates were elected to the Legislative Assembly in the 1871 election. The Premiers of Quebec are indicated by Bold italics. The Speakers of the Legislative Assembly are indicated by small caps. Cabinet Ministers are indicated by Italics.

Name	Party	Riding	First elected / previously elected	No. of terms
Sydney Robert Bellingham	Conservative	Argenteuil	1867	2nd term
Pierre-Samuel Gendron	Conservative	Bagot	1867	2nd term
Christian Henry Pozer (Note: Resigned seat on abolition of dual mandate, January 17, 1874.)	Liberal	Beauce	1867	2nd term
François-Xavier Dulac (1874)	Conservative	Beauce	1874	1st term
George-Étienne Cartier (Note: Died in office, May 20, 1873.)	Conservative	Beauharnois	1867	2nd term
Élie-Hercule Bisson (1873)	Liberal	Beauharnois	1873	1st term
Onésime Pelletier	Liberal	Bellechasse	1867	2nd term
Louis Sylvestre	Liberal	Berthier	1871	1st term
Théodore Robitaille	Conservative	Bonaventure	1871	1st term
Pierre-Clovis Beauchesne (1874)	Conservative	Bonaventure	1874	1st term
William Warren Lynch	Conservative	Brome	1871	1st term
Gédéon Larocque	Liberal	Chambly	1871	1st term
François-Xavier-Anselme Trudel	Conservative	Champlain	1871	1st term
Adolphe Gagnon	Liberal	Charlevoix	1871	1st term
Édouard Laberge	Liberal	Châteauguay	1867	2nd term
Pierre-Alexis Tremblay (Note: Resigned seat on abolition of dual mandate, January 17, 1874.)	Liberal	Chicoutimi et Saguenay	1867	2nd term
Michel Guillaume Baby (1874)	Conservative	Chicoutimi et Saguenay	1874	1st term
William Sawyer	Conservative	Compton	1871	1st term
Gédéon Ouimet	Conservative	Deux-Montagnes	1867	2nd term
Louis-Napoléon Larochelle	Conservative	Dorchester	1871	1st term
Wilfrid Laurier (Note: Resigned seat to stand in federal election, January 19, 1874.)	Liberal	Drummond et Arthabaska	1871	1st term
William John Watts (1874)	Conservative	Drummond et Arthabaska	1874	1st term
Pierre-Étienne Fortin (Note: Accepted Cabinet position, an office of profit on February 27, 1873.)	Conservative	Gaspé	1867	2nd term
Louis Beaubien	Conservative	Hochelaga	1867	2nd term
Thomas Sanders (Note: Died in office, March 21, 1874.)	Conservative	Huntingdon	1871	1st term
Alexander Cameron (1874)	Conservative	Huntingdon	1874	1st term
Louis Molleur	Liberal	Iberville	1867	2nd term
Pamphile-Gaspard Verreault	Conservative	Islet	1867	2nd term
Narcisse Lecavalier	Conservative	Jacques Cartier	1867	2nd term
Vincent-Paul Lavallée	Conservative	Joliette	1867	2nd term
Charles-François Roy	Conservative	Kamouraska	1869	2nd term
Andrew Esinhart	Conservative	Laprairie	1871	1st term
Onuphe Peltier	Conservative	L'Assomption	1871	1st term
Joseph-Hyacinthe Bellerose	Conservative	Laval	1867	2nd term
Joseph-Godric Blanchet	Conservative	Lévis	1867	2nd term
Henri-Gustave Joly de Lotbinière	Liberal	Lotbinière	1867	2nd term
Moïse Houde	Liberal	Maskinongé	1871	1st term
George Irvine	Conservative	Mégantic	1867	2nd term
Josiah Sandford Brigham	Conservative	Missisquoi	1867	2nd term
Josiah Sandford Brigham	Independent Conservative	Missisquoi	1867	2nd term
Firmin Dugas (Note: Resigned seat on abolition of dual mandate, January 20, 1874.)	Conservative	Montcalm	1867	2nd term
Louis-Gustave Martin (1874)	Conservative	Montcalm	1874	1st term
Télesphore Fournier (Note: Resigned seat on appointment to federal Cabinet, November 19, 1873.)	Liberal	Montmagny	1871	1st term
François Langelier (1873)	Liberal	Montmagny	1873	1st term
Joseph-Édouard Cauchon (Note: Resigned seat, December 10, 1872, then stood for re-election.)	Conservative	Montmorency	1867	2nd term
Auguste-Réal Angers (1874)	Conservative	Montmorency	1874	1st term
Luther Hamilton Holton (Note: Resigned seat on abolition of dual mandate, January 16, 1874.)	Liberal	Montréal Centre	1871	1st term
Charles Alexander (1874)	Liberal	Montréal Centre	1874	1st term
Ferdinand-Conon David	Conservative	Montréal Est	1871	1st term
Francis Cassidy (Note: Died in office, June 14, 1873.)	Conservative	Montreal Ouest	1871	1st term
John Wait McGauvran (1873)	Conservative	Montreal Ouest	1873	1st term
Laurent-David Lafontaine	Liberal	Napierville	1870	2nd term
François-Xavier-Ovide Méthot	Conservative	Nicolet	1871	1st term
Ezra Butler Eddy	Conservative	Ottawa	1871	1st term
John Poupore (Note: Resigned seat, October 8, 1874.)	Conservative	Pontiac	1867	2nd term
Levi Ruggles Church (1874)	Conservative	Pontiac	1867, (Note: Ottawa) 1874	2nd term*
Praxède Larue	Conservative	Portneuf	1867	2nd term
Pierre-Joseph-Olivier Chauveau (Note: Resigned seat on appointment to the Senate, February 25, 1873.)	Conservative	Québec-Comté	1867	2nd term
Pierre Garneau (1874)	Conservative	Québec-Comté	1874	1st term
Hector-Louis Langevin (Note: Resigned seat, January 21, 1874.)	Conservative	Québec-Centre	1867	2nd term
Rémi-Ferdinand Rinfret dit Malouin (1874)	Conservative	Québec-Centre	1874	1st term
Jacques-Philippe Rhéaume (Note: Resigned seat on appointment as agent to the Seigneuriale Commission, February 5, 1873.)	Conservative	Québec-Est	1867	2nd term
Charles Alphonse Pantaléon Pelletier (1873)	Liberal	Québec-Est	1873	1st term
Pierre-Vincent Valin (1874)	Conservative	Québec-Est	1874	1st term
John Hearn	Conservative	Québec-Ouest	1867	2nd term
Joseph-Adolphe Dorion	Conservative	Richelieu	1871	1st term
Jacques Picard	Conservative	Richmond et Wolfe	1867	2nd term
Louis Honoré Gosselin (Note: Resigned seat, March 29, 1872.)	Conservative	Rimouski	1871	1st term
Alexandre Chauveau (1872)	Conservative	Rimouski	1872	1st term
Victor Robert	Liberal	Rouville	1867	2nd term
Pierre Bachand	Liberal	St. Hyacinthe	1867	2nd term
Félix-Gabriel Marchand	Liberal	St. Jean	1867	2nd term
Elzéar Gérin	Conservative	St. Maurice	1871	1st term
Maurice Laframboise	Liberal	Shefford	1871	1st term
Joseph Gibb Robertson	Conservative	Sherbrooke	1867	2nd term
Humbert Saveuse de Beaujeu	Conservative	Soulanges	1871	1st term
Thomas Locke	Conservative	Stanstead	1867	2nd term
Élie Mailloux	Conservative	Témiscouata	1867	2nd term
Joseph-Adolphe Chapleau (Note: Accepted Cabinet position, an office of profit, February 27, 1873.)	Conservative	Terrebonne	1867	2nd term
Henri-Gédéon Malhiot (Note: Accepted Cabinet position, an office of profit, September 22, 1874.)	Conservative	Trois-Rivières	1871	1st term
Émery Lalonde, Sr.	Conservative	Vaudreuil	1871	1st term
Joseph Daigle	Liberal	Verchères	1871	1st term
Charles-Ignace Gill (Note: Resigned seat to stand in federal election, January 14, 1874.)	Conservative	Yamaska	1871	1st term
Joseph Nestor Duguay (1874)	Conservative	Yamaska	1874	1st term

=== By-elections ===
There were twenty-four by-elections during the term of the Second Legislature. Cabinet ministers are indicated by italics.

By-elections, 1872–1874
Name	Party	Riding	Reason for Vacancy	By-election Date
Alexandre Chauveau	Conservative	Rimouski	Incumbent resigned.	April 29, 1872
Joseph-Édouard Cauchon (Note: Resigned seat on abolition of dual mandate, January 21, 1874.)	Conservative	Montmorency	Resigned seat and then stood for election.	December 23, 1872
Charles Alphonse Pantaléon Pelletier (Note: Resigned seat on abolition of dual mandate, January 20, 1874.)	Liberal	Québec-Est	Incumbent resigned to take government position.	March 3, 1873
Joseph-Adolphe Chapleau	Conservative	Terrebonne	Accepted Cabinet position, an office of profit; re-elected.	March 12, 1873
Pierre Garneau (Note: Accepted Cabinet position, an office of profit, September 22, 1874.)	Conservative	Québec-Comté	Incumbent resigned on appointment to the Senate.	March 21, 1873
Pierre-Étienne Fortin	Conservative	Gaspé	Accepted Cabinet position, an office of profit; re-elected.	April 7, 1873
Élie-Hercule Bisson	Liberal	Beauharnois	Incumbent died in office.	July 12, 1873
John Wait McGauvran	Conservative	Montreal Ouest	Incumbent died in office.	August 22, 1873
François Langelier	Liberal	Montmagny	Incumbent appointed to federal Cabinet.	December 16, 1873
Charles Alexander	Liberal	Montréal Centre	Incumbent resigned seat on abolition of dual mandate.	February 6, 1874
Auguste-Réal Angers (Note: Accepted Cabinet position, an office of profit, September 22, 1874.)	Conservative	Montmorency	Incumbent resigned seat on abolition of dual mandate.	February 10, 1874
Joseph Nestor Duguay	Conservative	Yamaska	Incumbent resigned seat to stand for election to House of Commons.	February 11 and 12, 1874
William John Watts	Conservative	Drummond et Arthabaska	Incumbent resigned seat to stand for election to House of Commons.	February 20, 1874
François-Xavier Dulac	Conservative	Beauce	Incumbent resigned seat on abolition of dual mandate.	February 24, 1874
Louis-Gustave Martin	Conservative	Montcalm	Incumbent resigned seat on abolition of dual mandate.	March 13, 1874
Rémi-Ferdinand Rinfret dit Malouin	Conservative	Québec-Centre	Incumbent resigned seat.	April 16 and 17, 1874
Pierre-Vincent Valin	Conservative	Québec-Est	Incumbent resigned seat on abolition of dual mandate.	April 16 and 17, 1874
Michel Guillaume Baby	Conservative	Chicoutimi et Saguenay	Incumbent resigned seat on abolition of dual mandate.	May 2, 1874
Alexander Cameron	Conservative	Huntingdon	Incumbent died in office.	May 30, 1874
Pierre-Clovis Beauchesne	Conservative	Bonaventure	Incumbent resigned seat on abolition of dual mandate.	August 4 and 5, 1874
Henri-Gédéon Malhiot	Conservative	Trois-Rivières	Accepted Cabinet position, an office of profit; re-elected.	October 3, 1874
Auguste-Réal Angers	Conservative	Montmorency	Accepted Cabinet position, an office of profit; re-elected.	October 5, 1874
Pierre Garneau	Conservative	Québec-Comté	Accepted Cabinet position, an office of profit; re-elected.	October 5, 1874
Levi Ruggles Church	Conservative	Pontiac	Incumbent resigned seat.	October 26, 1874

== Legislative Council ==
=== Party standings ===
The Legislative Council continued to have a strong Conservative majority during the term of the Second Legislature.

Standings at First Session, 1871
Party	Members
Conservatives	21
Liberals	3
Total:	24
Government Majority:	18

=== Members during the Second Legislature ===
The Premier of Quebec is indicated by Bold italics. The Speakers of the Legislative Council are indicated by small caps. Cabinet members are indicated by italics.

Members 1871–1875
Legislative Council Divisions	Member	Party	Term Start	Term End
Alma	Beaudry, Jean-Louis	Conservative	November 2, 1867	June 25, 1886
Bedford	Wood, Thomas	Conservative	November 2, 1867	November 13, 1898
De la Durantaye	Beaubien, Joseph-Octave	Conservative	November 2, 1867	November 7, 1877
De la Vallière	Proulx, Jean-Baptiste-Georges	Liberal	November 2, 1867	January 27, 1884
De Lanaudière	Dostaler, Pierre-Eustache	Conservative	November 2, 1867	January 4, 1884
De Lorimier	Rodier, Charles-Séraphin	Conservative	November 2, 1867	February 3, 1876
De Salaberry	Starnes, Henry	Liberal	November 2, 1867	March 3, 1896
Grandville	Dionne, Élisée	Conservative	November 2, 1867	August 22, 1892
Gulf	Le Boutillier, John†	Conservative	November 2, 1867	July 31, 1872
Gulf	Vacant		August 1, 1872	November 18, 1873
Gulf	Savage, Thomas	Conservative	November 19, 1873	February 27, 1887
Inkerman	Bryson, George (Sr.)	Conservative	November 2, 1867	January 13, 1900
Kennebec	Thibaudeau, Isidore‡	Liberal	November 2, 1867	January 21, 1874
Kennebec	Richard, Louis	Conservative	February 5, 1874	November 13, 1876
La Salle	Panet, Louis	Conservative	November 2, 1867	May 15, 1884
Lauzon	Chaussegros de Léry, Alexandre-René	Conservative	November 2, 1867	December 19, 1880
Mille-Isles	Lemaire, Félix-Hyacinthe	Conservative	November 2, 1867	December 17, 1879
Montarville	Boucher de Boucherville, Charles-Eugène	Conservative	November 2, 1867	September 10, 1915
Repentigny	Archambeault, Louis	Conservative	November 2, 1867	June 6, 1888
Rigaud	Prud'homme, Eustache	Conservative	November 2, 1867	April 25, 1888
Rougemont	Fraser de Berry, John	Conservative	November 2, 1867	November 15, 1876
Saurel	Armstrong, David Morrison†	Conservative	November 2, 1867	April 14, 1873
Saurel	Vacant		April 15, 1873	November 18, 1873
Saurel	Roy, Pierre-Euclide	Conservative	November 19, 1873	October 31, 1882
Shawinigan	Ross, John Jones	Conservative	November 2, 1867	May 4, 1901
Stadacona	McGreevy, Thomas‡	Conservative	November 2, 1867	February 2, 1874
Stadacona	Sharples, John (Sr.)	Conservative	February 27, 1874	December 19, 1876
The Laurentides	Gingras, Jean-Élie	Conservative	November 2, 1867	December 10, 1887
Victoria	Ferrier, James	Conservative	November 2, 1867	May 30, 1888
Wellington	Hale, Edward†	Conservative	November 2, 1867	April 26, 1875
Wellington	Vacant		April 27, 1875	October 6, 1875

Vacancies of less than one month are not shown.
† Died in office.
‡ Resigned on abolition of the dual mandate.

== Executive Council during Second Legislature ==
There were three different ministries during the term of the Second Legislature, under Premiers Chauveau (1871–1873), Ouimet (1873–1874), and Boucher de Boucherville (1874–1875).

=== First Quebec Ministry: Chauveau Cabinet (1871-1873) ===
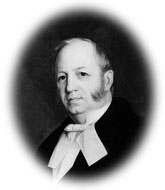
Pierre-Joseph-Olivier Chapleau, First Premier of Quebec, 1867-1873

Premier Chauveau continued the same membership in his Cabinet following the 1871 election. Chauveau and four of the ministers were Members of the Legislative Assembly, while three were Members of the Legislative Council. In addition to being premier, Chauveau held other portfolios.

Members of the Executive Council
Position	Minister	Term start	Term end
Premier and President of the Executive Council	Pierre-Joseph-Olivier Chauveau	1867	1873
Agriculture and Public Works	Louis Archambeault*	1867	1873
Attorney General	Gédéon Ouimet	1867	1873
Crown lands	Joseph-Octave Beaubien*	1867	1873
Public Education	Pierre-Joseph-Olivier Chauveau	1867	1873
Secretary and Registrar	Pierre-Joseph-Olivier Chauveau	1867	1873
Solicitor General	George Irvine	1867	1873
Speaker of the Legislative Council	Charles-Eugène Boucher de Boucherville*	1867	1873
Treasurer	Joseph Gibb Robertson	1869	1873
* Members of the Legislative Council

=== Second Quebec Ministry: Ouimet Cabinet (1873-1874) ===
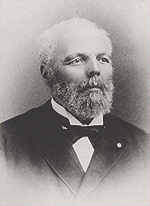
Gédéon Ouimet, Second Premier of Quebec, 1873-1874

Following Chauveau's resignation as premier, the Quebec Conservative party chose Gédéon Ouimet as party leader and thus Premier of Quebec. No general election was called. Ouimet installed a new Cabinet. Ouimet and four of the Cabinet ministers were Members of the Legislative Assembly, while two sat in the Legislative Council.

Members of the Executive Council
Position	Minister	Term start	Term end
Premier and President of the Executive Council	Gédéon Ouimet	1873	1874
Agriculture and Public Works	Louis Archambault*	1873	1874
Attorney General	George Irvine	1873	1874
Crown Lands	Pierre-Étienne Fortin	1873	1874
Public Instruction	Gédéon Ouimet	1873	1874
Secretary and Registrar	Gédéon Ouimet	1873	1874
Solicitor General	Joseph-Adolphe Chapleau	1873	1874
Speaker of the Legislative Council	John Jones Ross*	1873	1874
Treasurer	Joseph Gibb Robertson	1873	1874
* Members of the Legislative Council

=== Third Quebec Ministry: Boucher de Boucherville Cabinet (1874-1875) ===
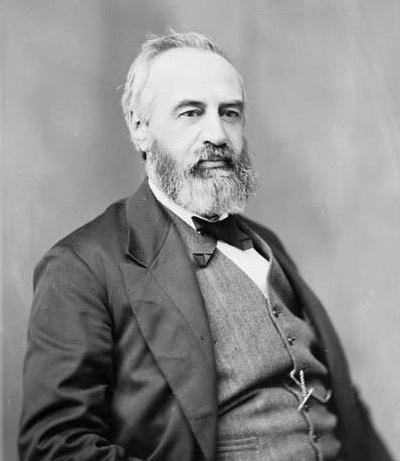
Charles Boucher de Boucherville, Third Premier of Quebec, 1874-1878

As a result of the Tanneries scandal, Premier Ouimet and three Cabinet ministers resigned. The Conservative party chose Boucher de Boucherville to be premier. He replaced almost all of the Cabinet, retaining only Robertson as Treasurer. All of the Cabinet ministers were members of the Legislative Assembly, except the Speaker of the Legislative Council abs Boucher de Boucherville himself.

Members of the Executive Council
Position	Minister	Term start	Term end
Premier and President of the Executive Council	Charles-Eugène Boucher de Boucherville*	1874	1875
Agriculture and Public Works	Pierre Garneau	1874	1875
Attorney General	Levi Ruggles Church	1874	1875
Crown Lands	Henri-Gédéon Malhiot	1874	1875
Public Education	Charles-Eugène Boucher de Boucherville*	1874	1875
Secretary and Registrar	Charles-Eugène Boucher de Boucherville*	1874	1875
Solicitor General	Auguste-Real Angers	1874	1875
Speaker of the Legislative Council	Felix-Hyacinthe Lemaire*	1874	1875
Treasurer	Joseph Gibb Robertson	1874	1875
* Members of the Legislative Council

== Leader of the Opposition ==
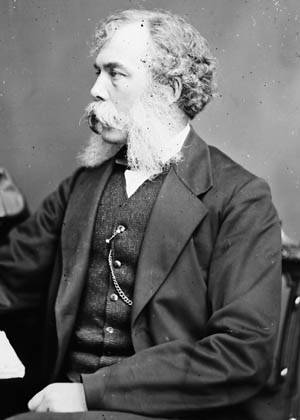
Henri-Gustave Joly de Lotbinière: First Leader of the Opposition, 1869-1878

Henri-Gustave Joly de Lotbinière continued as Leader of the Opposition throughout the Second Legislature.

== Legislative sessions ==
The legislature had four annual sessions:

- First session: November 7, 1871, to December 23, 1871, with thirty-five sitting days.
- Second session: November 7, 1872, to December 24, 1872, with thirty-five sitting days.
- Third session: December 4, 1873, to January 28, 1874, with twenty-nine sitting days.
- Fourth and final session: December 3, 1874, to February 23, 1875, with forty-two sitting days.

The legislature did not meet again prior to its dissolution on June 7, 1875.
