= 1st Quebec Legislature =

Legislature of Quebec Législature du Québec
- First Legislature, 1867 - 1871

Type
- Type: Bicameral
- Houses: Legislative Council; Legislative Assembly
- Term limits: Four years, subject to earlier dissolution

History
- Founded: July 1, 1867
- Succeeded by: Second Legislature of Quebec, 1871-1875

Leadership
- Monarch: Victoria
- Lieutenant Governor: Narcisse-Fortunat Belleau
- Premier: Pierre-Joseph-Olivier Chauveau, Conservative
- Speaker of the Legislative Council: Charles Boucher de Boucherville, Conservative
- Speaker of the Legislative Assembly: Joseph-Goderic Blanchet, Conservative
- Leader of the Opposition: Henri-Gustave Joly de Lotbinière (from 1869 onwards), Liberal

Structure
- Seats: Legislative Council: 24; Legislative Assembly: 65
- Legislative Council political groups: Conservatives 21; Liberals 3
- Legislative Assembly political groups: Conservatives 51; Liberals 12; Independent 1 Vacant 1

Elections
- Legislative Council voting system: Life appointments
- Legislative Assembly voting system: Single member constituencies First-past-the-post voting Open ballot system Adult male franchise with property qualification

Constitution
- British North America Act, 1867

The First Legislature of Quebec was summoned in 1867 when the new Canadian province of Quebec was created, as part of the new country of Canada.

The legislature had two chambers: the elected lower house, the Legislative Assembly, and the appointed upper house, the Legislative Council. The first general election for the Legislative Assembly was held in August and September, 1867, and returned a majority for the Quebec Conservative Party led by Premier Pierre-Joseph-Olivier Chauveau. The Liberal Party of Quebec formed the Official Opposition.

The Chauveau government then appointed the first members to the Legislative Council in November, 1867, who were sworn into their positions in December, 1867. The Conservatives had a strong majority in the Legislative Council.

The first session of the legislature was called on December 27, 1867. The legislature had four annual sessions, until its dissolution on May 27, 1871, triggering the second general election.

== Creation of the Legislature ==
The province of Quebec was created on July 1, 1867, when the British North America Act, 1867 came into force, splitting the old Province of Canada into the new provinces of Quebec (formerly Lower Canada) and Ontario (formerly Upper Canada). That Act also created the Legislature of Quebec, composed of the Lieutenant Governor, the Legislative Assembly and the Legislative Council.

The Act provided that the Lieutenant Governor was to be appointed by the Governor General of Canada for a term of five years, subject to dismissal for cause. The Legislative Assembly was to consist of sixty-five members, elected in single-member constituencies. The Legislative Assembly was to last for four years, subject to being dissolved earlier by the Lieutenant Governor. The Legislative Council was to consist of twenty-four members, appointed for life. Each Legislative Councillor was appointed to represent one of the twenty-four divisions which had formerly been used in the Legislative Council of the Province of Canada

== Elections and Qualifications ==
The first election was conducted under the electoral laws of the former Province of Canada, which had been continued in force until such time as the Quebec Legislature enacted electoral laws specifically for Quebec.

=== Right to vote ===
The right to vote in elections to the Legislative Assembly was not universal. Only male British subjects (by birth or naturalisation), aged 21 and older, were eligible to vote, and only if they met a property qualification. For residents of cities and towns, the qualification was being the owner, tenant or occupant of real property assessed at three hundred dollars, or at an assessed yearly value of thirty dollars. For residents of townships and parishes, the requirements were either an assessment of two hundred dollars, or an assessed yearly value of twenty dollars.

Women were expressly prohibited from voting, "for any Electoral Division whatever".

Judges and many municipal and provincial officials were also barred from voting, particularly officials with duties relating to public revenue. Election officials were also barred from voting.

Voting was done by open ballotting, where the voters publicly declared their vote to the election officials.

=== Qualification for the Legislative Assembly ===
Candidates for the Legislative Assembly had to meet a significant property qualification. A candidate had to own real property in the Province of Canada, worth at least £500 in British sterling, over and above any encumbrances on the property.

=== Qualification for the Legislative Council ===
The qualifications for the members of the Legislative Council were the same as for the members of the Senate of Canada.

Those requirements were:

1. Be of the full age of thirty years;
2. Be a British subject, either natural-born or naturalised;
3. Possess real property in Quebec worth at least $4,000, over and above any debts or incumbrances on the property;
4. Have a net worth of at least $4,000, over and above debts and liabilities;
5. Reside in Quebec;
6. Reside in, or possess his qualifying real property, in the division he was named to represent.

The provisions of the British North America Act, 1867 did not explicitly bar women from being called to the Senate of Canada. However, until the Persons Case in 1929, it was assumed that women could not be called to the Senate, and thus were also barred from the Legislative Council. In any event, no woman was ever appointed to the Legislative Council.

== First government and election ==
The first Governor General of Canada, Viscount Monck, appointed Narcisse-Fortunat Belleau, a former premier of the Province of Canada, as the first Lieutenant Governor, effective July 1, 1867. Belleau in turn appointed Pierre-Joseph-Olivier Chauveau as premier on July 15, 1867. Chauveau had formerly been active in politics as a member of the Legislative Assembly and the Cabinet of the Province of Canada, but he had been out of electoral politics since 1855. He was appointed as a compromise candidate to begin the government of the new province.

The first general election for the Legislative Assembly was held in August and September 1867. Chauveau and the Conservatives won a strong majority of fifty-one seats in the sixty-five seat Assembly. The Chaveau government then appointed the twenty-four members of the Legislative Council. Twenty-one of the appointed members supported the Conservative party.

== Legislative Assembly ==
=== Party standings ===
The 1867 elections returned a majority in the Legislative Assembly for the Conservative Party, led by Premier Chauveau.

1867 Election Results
Party	Members
Conservatives	51
Liberals	12
Independent	1
Vacant	(1)
Total	65
Government Majority	38

=== Members of the Legislative Assembly ===
The following candidates were elected to the Legislative Assembly in the 1867 election. The Premier of Quebec is indicated by Bold italics. The Speaker of the Legislative Assembly is indicated by small caps. Cabinet Ministers are indicated by Italics.

Name	Party	Riding	First elected	No. of terms
Sydney Robert Bellingham	Conservative	Argenteuil	1867	1st term
Pierre-Samuel Gendron	Conservative	Bagot	1867	1st term
Christian Henry Pozer	Liberal	Beauce	1867	1st term
Célestin Bergevin	Conservative	Beauharnois	1867	1st term
Onésime Pelletier	Liberal	Bellechasse	1867	1st term
Louis-Joseph Moll	Conservative	Berthier	1867	1st term
Clarence Hamilton	Liberal	Bonaventure	1867	1st term
Christopher Dunkin	Conservative	Brome	1867	1st term
Jean-Baptiste Jodoin	Conservative	Chambly	1867	1st term
John Jones Ross (Note: Seat became vacant on appointment to the Legislative Council, November 2, 1867)	Conservative	Champlain	1867	1st term
Jean-Charles Chapais (1867)	Conservative	Champlain	1867	1st term
Léon-Charles Clément	Conservative	Charlevoix	1867	1st term
Édouard Laberge	Liberal	Châteauguay	1867	1st term
Pierre-Alexis Tremblay	Independent	Chicoutimi et Saguenay	1867	1st term
James Ross	Conservative	Compton	1867	1st term
Gédéon Ouimet	Conservative	Deux-Montagnes	1867	1st term
Hector-Louis Langevin	Conservative	Dorchester	1867	1st term
Edward John Hemming	Conservative	Drummond et Arthabaska	1867	1st term
Pierre-Étienne Fortin	Conservative	Gaspé	1867	1st term
Louis Beaubien	Conservative	Hochelaga	1867	1st term
Julius Scriver (Note: Resigned on standing for election to the House of Commons, October 6, 1869.)	Conservative	Huntingdon	1867	1st term
William Cantwell (1869)	Conservative	Huntingdon	1869	1st term
Louis Molleur	Liberal	Iberville	1867	1st term
Pamphile-Gaspard Verreault	Conservative	Islet	1867	1st term
Narcisse Lecavalier	Conservative	Jacques Cartier	1867	1st term
Vincent-Paul Lavallée	Conservative	Joliette	1867	1st term
Vacant (until 1869)	–	Kamouraska		
Charles-François Roy	Conservative	Kamouraska	1869	1st term
Césaire Thérien	Conservative	Laprairie	1867	1st term
Étienne Mathieu	Conservative	L'Assomption	1867	1st term
Joseph-Hyacinthe Bellerose	Conservative	Laval	1867	1st term
Joseph-Godric Blanchet	Conservative	Lévis	1867	1st term
Henri-Gustave Joly de Lotbinière	Liberal	Lotbinière	1867	1st term
Alexis Lesieur Desaulniers	Conservative	Maskinongé	1867	1st term
George Irvine	Conservative	Mégantic	1867	1st term
Josiah Sandford Brigham	Conservative	Missisquoi	1867	1st term
Firmin Dugas	Conservative	Montcalm	1867	1st term
Louis-Henri Blais	Liberal	Montmagny	1867	1st term
Joseph-Édouard Cauchon	Conservative	Montmorency	1867	1st term
Edward Brock Carter	Conservative	Montréal Centre	1867	1st term
George-Étienne Cartier	Conservative	Montréal Est	1867	1st term
Alexander Walker Ogilvie	Conservative	Montreal Ouest	1867	1st term
Pierre Benoit (Note: Died in office, August 26, 1870.)	Liberal	Napierville	1867	1st term
Laurent-David Lafontaine (1870)	Liberal	Napierville	1870	1st term
Joseph Gaudet	Conservative	Nicolet	1867	1st term
Levi Ruggles Church	Conservative	Ottawa	1867	1st term
John Poupore	Conservative	Pontiac	1867	1st term
Praxède Larue	Conservative	Portneuf	1867	1st term
Pierre-Joseph-Olivier Chauveau	Conservative	Québec-Comté	1867	1st term
Georges-Honoré Simard	Conservative	Québec-Centre	1867	1st term
Jacques-Philippe Rhéaume	Conservative	Québec-Est	1867	1st term
John Hearn	Conservative	Québec-Ouest	1867	1st term
Joseph Beaudreau (Note: Died in office, October 5, 1869.)	Conservative	Richelieu	1867	1st term
Pierre Gélinas (1869)	Conservative	Richelieu	1869	1st term
Jacques Picard	Conservative	Richmond et Wolfe	1867	1st term
Joseph Garon	Conservative	Rimouski	1867	1st term
Victor Robert	Liberal	Rouville	1867	1st term
Pierre Bachand	Liberal	St. Hyacinthe	1867	1st term
Félix-Gabriel Marchand	Liberal	St. Jean	1867	1st term
Abraham Lesieur Desaulniers	Conservative	St. Maurice	1867	1st term
Michel-Adrien Bessette	Conservateur	Shefford	1867	1st term
Joseph Gibb Robertson (Note: Accepted a Cabinet position, a triggering a ministerial by-election.)	Conservative	Sherbrooke	1867	1st term
Dominique-Amable Coutlée	Conservative	Soulanges	1867	1st term
Thomas Locke	Conservative	Stanstead	1867	1st term
Élie Mailloux	Conservative	Témiscouata	1867	1st term
Joseph-Adolphe Chapleau	Conservative	Terrebonne	1867	1st term
Louis-Charles Boucher de Niverville (Note: Resigned on appointment as sheriff for district of Trois-Rivières, September 30, 1868.)	Conservative	Trois-Rivières	1867	1st term
Sévère Dumoulin (1868) (Note: Resigned on being appointed sheriff for the district of Trois-Rivières, September 16, 1869.)	Conservative	Trois-Rivières	1868	1st term
Charles-Borromée Genest (1869)	Conservative	Trois-Rivières	1869	1st term
Antoine-Chartier de Lotbinière Harwood	Conservative	Vaudreuil	1867	1st term
André-Boniface Craig	Conservative	Verchères	1867	1st term
Louis-Adélard Sénécal	Liberal	Yamaska	1867	1st term

=== By-elections ===
There were eight by-elections during the term of the First Legislature.

By-elections, 1867-1870
Name	Party	Riding	Reason for Vacancy	By-election Date
Jean-Charles Chapais	Conservative	Champlain	Incumbent appointed to Legislative Council	December 16, 1867
Sévère Dumoulin (Note: Resigned on being appointed sheriff for the district of Trois-Rivières, September 16, 1869.)	Conservative	Trois-Rivières	Incumbent appointed sheriff of Trois-Rivières	October 16, 1868
Charles-François Roy	Conservative	Kamouraska	Election deferred to 1869 due to riots	February 11, 1869
Charles-Borromée Genest	Conservative	Trois-Rivières	Incumbent appointed sheriff of Trois-Rivières	October 19, 1869
Pierre Gélinas	Conservative	Richelieu	Death of incumbent	October 26, 1869
Joseph Gibb Robertson	Conservative	Sherbrooke	Accepted a Cabinet position, triggering a ministerial by-election; re-elected.	November 5, 1869
William Cantwell	Conservative	Huntingdon	Incumbent elected to House of Commons	November 6, 1869
Laurent-David Lafontaine	Liberal	Napierville	Death of incumbent	October 11, 1870

== Legislative Council ==
=== Party standings ===
Following the election, the Chauveau government appointed twenty-four individuals to the Legislative Council. The result was a Council with a strong Conservative majority.

Standings at First Session, 1867
Party	Members
Conservatives	21
Liberals	3
Total:	24
Government Majority:	18

=== Members during the First Legislature ===
The Speaker of the Legislative Council is indicated by small caps. Cabinet members are indicated by italics.

Members 1867-1871
Legislative Council Divisions	Member	Party	Term Start	Term End
Alma	Beaudry, Jean-Louis	Conservative	November 2, 1867	June 25, 1886
Bedford	Wood, Thomas	Conservative	November 2, 1867	November 13, 1898
De la Durantaye	Beaubien, Joseph-Octave	Conservative	November 2, 1867	November 7, 1877
De la Vallière	Proulx, Jean-Baptiste-Georges	Liberal	November 2, 1867	January 27, 1884
De Lanaudière	Dostaler, Pierre-Eustache	Conservative	November 2, 1867	January 4, 1884
De Lorimier	Rodier, Charles-Séraphin	Conservative	November 2, 1867	February 3, 1876
De Salaberry	Starnes, Henry	Liberal	November 2, 1867	March 3, 1896
Grandville	Dionne, Élisée	Conservative	November 2, 1867	August 22, 1892
Gulf	Le Boutillier, John	Conservative	November 2, 1867	July 31, 1872
Inkerman	Bryson, George (Sr.)	Conservative	November 2, 1867	January 13, 1900
Kennebec	Thibaudeau, Isidore	Liberal	November 2, 1867	January 21, 1874
La Salle	Panet, Louis	Conservative	November 2, 1867	May 15, 1884
Lauzon	Chaussegros de Léry, Alexandre-René	Conservative	November 2, 1867	December 19, 1880
Mille-Isles	Lemaire, Félix-Hyacinthe	Conservative	November 2, 1867	December 17, 1879
Montarville	Boucher de Boucherville, Charles-Eugène	Conservative	November 2, 1867	September 10, 1915
Repentigny	Archambeault, Louis	Conservative	November 2, 1867	June 6, 1888
Rigaud	Prud'homme, Eustache	Conservative	November 2, 1867	April 25, 1888
Rougemont	Fraser de Berry, John	Conservative	November 2, 1867	November 15, 1876
Saurel	Armstrong, David Morrison	Conservative	November 2, 1867	April 14, 1873
Shawinigan	Ross, John Jones	Conservative	November 2, 1867	May 4, 1901
Stadacona	McGreevy, Thomas	Conservative	November 2, 1867	February 2, 1874
The Laurentides	Gingras, Jean-Élie	Conservative	November 2, 1867	December 10, 1887
Victoria	Ferrier, James	Conservative	November 2, 1867	May 30, 1888
Wellington	Hale, Edward	Conservative	November 2, 1867	April 26, 1875

=== Qualifications of the Legislative Councillors ===
Fifteen of the individuals appointed had previously been involved in the government of the Province of Canada, sitting in either the Legislative Assembly or the Legislative Council: Beaubien, Proulx, Dostaler, Le Boutillier, Bryson, Thibaudeau, Panet, Boucher de Boucherville, Archambeault, Prud'homme, Armstrong, Ross, Gingras, Ferrier and Hale.

Nine of the individuals had been involved in municipal politics: Beaudry, Rodier, and Starnes had all been mayors of Montreal (and Beaudry would continue to be); Wood, Bryson, Lemaire, Archambeault, McGreevy, and Ferrier were all involved in other municipalities.

Five of the individuals were involved in business or their seigneuries: Dionne, Thibaudeau, Chaussegros de Léry, Fraser de Berry and McGreevy.

== First Quebec Ministry: Chauveau Cabinet, 1867-1873 ==
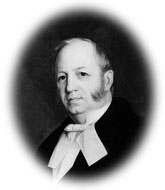
Pierre-Joseph-Olivier Chauveau, First Premier of Quebec, 1867-1873

The first Cabinet for Quebec consisted of Premier Chauveau and six other Cabinet ministers. Chauveau and four of the ministers were Members of the Legislative Assembly, while two were Members of the Legislative Council. Chauveau held other ministries, in addition to being premier.

Members of the Executive Council
Position	Minister	Term start	Term end
Premier and President of the Executive Council	Pierre-Joseph-Olivier Chauveau	1867	1873
Agriculture and Public Works	Louis Archambeault*	1867	1873
Attorney General	Gédéon Ouimet	1867	1873
Crown lands	Joseph-Octave Beaubien*	1867	1873
Public Instruction	Pierre-Joseph-Olivier Chauveau	1867	1873
Secretary and Registrar	Pierre-Joseph-Olivier Chauveau	1867	1873
Solicitor General	George Irvine	1867	1873
Speaker of the Legislative Council	Charles-Eugène Boucher de Boucherville*	1867	1873
Treasurer	Christopher Dunkin	1867	1869
Treasurer	Joseph Gibb Robertson	1869	1873
* Members of the Legislative Council

== Leader of the Opposition ==
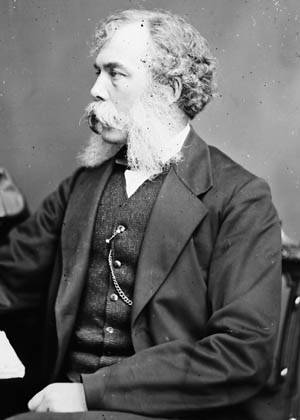
Henri-Gustave Joly de Lotbinière: First Leader of the Opposition, 1869-1878

When the legislature first met, the Liberals did not have a formal party structure or leader. As a result, there was no official Leader of the Opposition for the first session of the legislature. Henri-Gustave Joly de Lotbinière gradually emerged as the leader of the Liberals. Late in the second session held in 1869, he was formally elected Liberal leader and took the position in the House opposite to the Premier, as the Leader of the Opposition.

== Legislative sessions ==
The legislature had four annual sessions:

- First session: December 27, 1867 to February 24, 1868, with thirty-nine sitting days.
- Second session: January 20, 1869 to April 5, 1869, with forty-eight sitting days.
- Third session: November 23, 1869 to February 1, 1870, with thirty-eight sitting days.
- Fourth and final session: November 3, 1870 to December 24, 1870, with thirty-eight sitting days.

The legislature did not meet again prior to its dissolution on May 27, 1871.
