= 3rd Quebec Legislature =

Legislature of Quebec Législature du Québec
- Third Legislature, 1875 - 1878

Type
- Type: Bicameral
- Houses: Legislative Council; Legislative Assembly
- Term limits: Four years, subject to earlier dissolution.

History
- Founded: July 1, 1867
- Preceded by: Second Legislature of Quebec, 1871-1875
- Succeeded by: Fourth Legislature of Quebec, 1878-1881

Leadership
- Monarch: Victoria
- Lieutenant Governor: René-Édouard Caron (1873-1876); Luc Letellier de St-Just (1876-1879)
- Premier: Charles Boucher de Boucherville (1874-1878) (Conservative); Henri-Gustave Joly de Lotbinière (Liberal) (1878-1879)
- Speaker of the Legislative Council: Félix-Hyacinthe Lemaire (1875-1876) (Conservative); John Jones Ross (1876-1878) (Conservative); Henry Starnes (1878) (Liberal)
- Speaker of the Legislative Assembly: Pierre-Étienne Fortin (1875-1876) Conservative; Louis Beaubien (1876-1878) Conservative
- Leader of the Opposition: Henri-Gustave Joly de Lotbinière (1875-1878) Liberal; Joseph-Adolphe Chapleau (1878) Conservative

Structure
- Seats: Legislative Council: 24; Legislative Assembly: 65
- Legislative Council political groups: Conservatives 21; Liberals 3
- Legislative Assembly political groups: Conservatives 44; Liberals 19; Independent Conservatives 2

Elections
- Legislative Council voting system: Life appointments
- Legislative Assembly voting system: Single member constituencies First-past-the-post voting Secret ballot Adult male franchise with property qualification

Constitution
- British North America Act, 1867

The Third Legislature of Quebec was the provincial legislature of Quebec, Canada from 1875 to 1878, following the general election of 1875.

In the 1875 election, Premier Charles Boucher de Boucherville and the Conservative Party of Quebec won a majority in the Legislative Assembly and continued in office with a majority government. However, in 1878, de Boucherville was dismissed from office by the Lieutenant Governor of Quebec Luc Letellier de Saint-Just, who appointed Henri-Gustave Joly de Lotbinière, the leader of the Quebec Liberal Party as premier.

Joly de Lotbinière formed a minority government. It was the first time the Liberals were in office since Quebec had been created in 1867, and the first minority government in Quebec's history. Lotbinière immediately called a general election due to the minority status of his government.

The legislature held three annual sessions, with the first session called on November 4, 1875. The legislature was dissolved on March 22, 1878, leading to the 1878 general election on May 1, 1878.

== Structure of the legislature ==
The Legislature of Quebec was created by the British North America Act, 1867. It consisted of the Lieutenant Governor of Quebec, the Legislative Assembly and the Legislative Council. The Lieutenant Governor was appointed by the Governor General of Canada for a term of five years. The Legislative Assembly consisted of sixty-five members, elected in single-member constituencies by first-past-the-post elections. The Legislative Assembly was to last for four years, subject to being dissolved earlier by the Lieutenant Governor. The Legislative Council consisted of twenty-four members, appointed for life by the Government of Quebec.

== Elections and qualifications ==
=== Right to vote ===
The 1875 election for the Legislative Assembly had been the first time the secret ballot was used in Quebec. Prior to 1875, voting had been by open ballotting, where voters publicly declared their vote to the polling officials.

The right to vote in elections to the Legislative Assembly was not universal. Only male British subjects (by birth or naturalisation), aged 21 or older, were eligible to vote, and only if they met a property qualification. For residents of larger cities, the qualification was to own or occupy real property assessed at three hundred dollars or more. For tenants, the qualification was paying an annual rent of thirty dollars or more. For any other municipality, the qualification was to own or occupy real property assessed at two hundred dollars or more, or twenty dollars in annual value. For tenants in smaller centers, the qualification was paying an annual rent of twenty dollars or more.

Women were completely barred from voting.

Judges and many municipal and provincial officials were also barred from voting, particularly officials with law enforcement duties, or duties relating to public revenue. The Returning Officer in each riding was also barred from voting, except when needed to give a casting vote in the event of a tie vote.

=== Qualification for the Legislative Assembly ===
Candidates for election to the Legislative Assembly had to meet stricter qualifications than voters. In addition to being male, twenty-one or older, and a subject of Her Majesty (by birth or naturalisation), a candidate had to be free from all legal incapacity, and be the proprietor in possession of lands or tenements worth at least $2,000, over and above all encumbrances and charges on the property.

Women were completely barred from membership in the Assembly.

=== Qualification for the Legislative Council ===
The qualifications for the members of the Legislative Council were the same as for the members of the Senate of Canada.

Those requirements were:

1. Be of the full age of thirty years;
2. Be a British subject, either natural-born or naturalised;
3. Possess real property in Quebec worth at least $4,000, over and above any debts or incumbrances on the property;
4. Have a net worth of at least $4,000, over and above debts and liabilities;
5. Reside in Quebec;
6. Reside in, or possess his qualifying real property, in the division he was named to represent.

The provisions of the British North America Act, 1867 did not explicitly bar women from being called to the Senate of Canada. However, until the Persons Case in 1929, it was assumed that women could not be called to the Senate, and were thus also barred from the Legislative Council. In any event, no woman was ever appointed to the Legislative Council.

== Events of the Third Legislature ==
Boucher de Boucherville and the Conservatives won a strong majority in the 1875 election, 44 out of the 65 seats in the Legislative Assembly. In the first session of the legislature, the government directed an investigation into the Tanneries scandal, which had brought down the government of former premier Gédéon Ouimet prior to the election.

However, the political situation became unstable when the federal Liberal government appointed a new lieutenant governor, Luc Letellier de St-Just, after the death in office of Lieutenant Governor René-Édouard Caron. Letellier de St-Just was a strongly partisan Liberal, and continued to be so after his appointment to the position of lieutenant governor. He was critical of the measures taken by the Conservative government. At the same time, Boucher de Boucherville appears to have taken for granted that the Lieutenant Governor would automatically give his formal approval to government measures, as required by the principles of responsible government, to the point where Boucher de Boucherville issued some proclamations on behalf of the lieutenant governor, without consulting Letellier de St-Just.

The matter came to a head in 1878, over a series of railway measures. The Quebec government was cash-strapped, and the legislature passed statutes to require municipalities to contribute to the cost of building railways which ran through them. Letellier de St-Just concluded that these bills were unconstitutional and on March 2, 1878 he dismissed Boucher de Boucherville as premier. He called on the Leader of the Opposition, Henri-Gustave Joly de Lotbinière, to form a government, even though the Liberals were in the minority in the Legislative Assembly. One of Joly de Lotbinière's first acts as premier was to advise the Lieutenant Governor to dissolve the Assembly and call a general election, the election of 1878, which returned a minority government for the Liberals.

The dismissal caused a constitutional and political crisis in Quebec, where the dismissal was referred to as a coup d'état. It also had reverberations in Ottawa. The Liberal government of Prime Minister Alexander Mackenzie had not been consulted and were caught by surprise. Mackenzie and Wilfrid Laurier privately condemned the dismissal. The government were attacked by the Conservative opposition for the actions of the lieutenant governor, which were alleged to be contrary to the principles of the neutrality of the Crown.

== Legislative Assembly ==
=== Party standings ===
The 1875 election returned a majority in the Legislative Assembly for the Conservative Party, led by Premier Boucher de Boucherville.

1875 Election Results
Party	Members
Conservatives	43
Liberals	19
Independent Conservative	3
Total	65
Government Majority	21

=== Members of the Legislative Assembly ===
The following candidates were elected to the Legislative Assembly in the 1875 election. The Premier of Quebec is indicated by Bold italics. The Speakers of the Legislative Assembly are indicated by small caps. Cabinet Ministers are indicated by Italics.

Name	Party	Riding	First elected / previously elected	No. of terms
Sydney Robert Bellingham	Conservative	Argenteuil	1867	3rd term
Pierre-Samuel Gendron (Note: Resigned seat to accept position as prothonotary for the judicial district of Montreal, June 12, 1876.)	Conservative	Bagot	1867	3rd term
Flavien Dupont (1876)	Conservative	Bagot	1876	1st term
François-Xavier Dulac	Conservative	Beauce	1874	2nd term
Élie-Hercule Bisson	Liberal	Beauharnois	1873	2nd term
Pierre Fradet	Conservative	Bellechasse	1875	1st term
Louis Sylvestre	Liberal	Berthier	1871	2nd term
Pierre-Clovis Beauchesne (Note: Election annulled, December 19, 1876.)	Conservative	Bonaventure	1874	2nd term
Joseph-Israël Tarte (1877)	Conservative	Bonaventure	1877	1st term
William Warren Lynch	Conservative	Brome	1871	2nd term
Raymond Préfontaine	Liberal	Chambly	1875	1st term
Dominique-Napoléon Saint-Cyr	Conservative	Champlain	1875	1st term
Onésime Gauthier	Conservative	Charlevoix	1875	1st term
Édouard Laberge	Liberal	Châteauguay	1867	3rd term
William Evan Price	Conservative	Chicoutimi et Saguenay	1875	1st term
William Sawyer	Conservative	Compton	1871	2nd term
Gédéon Ouimet (Note: Resigned seat to accept position as Superintendent of Public Instruction, January 28, 1876.)	Conservative	Deux-Montagnes	1867	3rd term
Charles Champagne (1876)	Conservative	Deux-Montagnes	1876	1st term
Louis-Napoléon Larochelle	Conservative	Dorchester	1871	2nd term
William John Watts	Independent Conservative	Drummond et Arthabaska	1874	2nd term
Pierre-Étienne Fortin (Note: Election annulled, March 7, 1877.)	Conservative	Gaspé	1867	3rd term
Louis Beaubien	Conservative	Hochelaga	1867	3rd term
Alexander Cameron (Note: Election annulled, March 31, 1876.)	Liberal	Huntingdon	1874	2nd term
Louis Molleur	Liberal	Iberville	1867	3rd term
Pamphile-Gaspard Verreault	Conservative	Islet	1867	3rd term
Narcisse Lecavalier	Conservative	Jacques Cartier	1867	3rd term
Vincent-Paul Lavallée	Conservative	Joliette	1867	3rd term
Charles-François Roy (Note: Resigned seat to stand for election to House of Commons, February 12, 1877.)	Conservative	Kamouraska	1869	3rd term
Joseph Dumont (1877)	Liberal	Kamouraska	1877	1st term
Léon-Benoît-Alfred Charlebois	Conservative	Laprairie	1875	1st term
Onuphe Peltier	Conservative	L'Assomption	1871	2nd term
Louis-Onésime Loranger	Conservative	Laval	1875	1st term
Étienne-Théodore Pâquet	Conservative	Lévis	1875	1st term
Henri-Gustave Joly de Lotbinière	Liberal	Lotbinière	1867	3rd term
Moïse Houde	Conservative	Maskinongé	1871	2nd term
George Irvine (Note: Resigned on appointment as commissioner of the Quebec, Montreal, Ottawa and Occidental Railway, January 28, 1876.)	Liberal	Mégantic	1867 (Note: First elected as a Conservative)	3rd term
Andrew Kennedy (1876)	Conservative	Mégantic	1876	1st term
George Barnard Baker (Note: Accepted a Cabinet position, an office of profit, triggering by-election, January 24, 1876.)	Conservative	Missisquoi	1875	1st term
Louis-Gustave Martin	Conservative	Montcalm	1874	2nd term
Auguste-Charles-Philippe Landry (Note: Election annulled May 29, 1876.)	Conservative	Montmagny	1875	1st term
Louis-Napoléon Fortin (1876)	Liberal	Montmagny	1876	1st term
Auguste-Réal Angers	Conservative	Montmorency	1874	2nd term
Alexander Walker Ogilvie	Conservative	Montréal Centre	1867, (Note: Montreal Ouest) 1875	2nd term*
Louis-Olivier Taillon	Conservative	Montréal Est	1875	1st term
John Wait McGauvran	Conservative	Montreal Ouest	1873	2nd term
Laurent-David Lafontaine	Liberal	Napierville	1870	3rd term
François-Xavier-Ovide Méthot (Note: Election annulled by the Superior Court, June 28, 1876.)	Conservative	Nicolet	1871	2nd term
Charles-Édouard Houde (1876)	Conservative	Nicolet	1876	1st term
Louis Duhamel	Conservative	Ottawa	1875	1st term
Levi Ruggles Church	Conservative	Pontiac	1867, (Note: Ottawa) 1874	3rd term*
Praxède Larue	Conservative	Portneuf	1867	3rd term
Pierre Garneau	Conservative	Québec-Comté	1874	2nd term
Rémi-Ferdinand Rinfret dit Malouin	Liberal	Québec-Centre	1874	2nd term
Joseph Shehyn	Liberal	Québec-Est	1875	1st term
John Hearn (Note: Resigned seat on appointment to the Legislative Council, November 9, 1877.)	Conservative	Québec-Ouest	1867	3rd term
Richard Alleyn (1877)	Conservative	Québec-Ouest	1877	1st term
Michel Mathieu	Conservative	Richelieu	1875	1st term
Jacques Picard	Conservative	Richmond et Wolfe	1867	3rd term
Alexandre Chauveau	Independent Conservative	Rimouski	1872	2nd term
Victor Robert	Liberal	Rouville	1867	3rd term
Pierre Bachand	Liberal	St. Hyacinthe	1867	3rd term
Félix-Gabriel Marchand	Liberal	St. Jean	1867	3rd term
Élie Lacerte	Conservative	St. Maurice	1875	1st term
Maurice Laframboise	Liberal	Shefford	1871	2nd term
Joseph Gibb Robertson	Conservative	Sherbrooke	1867	3rd term
Joseph Gibb Robertson	Independent Conservative	Sherbrooke	1867	3rd term
Humbert Saveuse de Beaujeu	Independent Conservative	Soulanges	1871	2nd term
John Thornton	Conservative	Stanstead	1875	1st term
Georges-Honoré Deschênes	Conservative	Témiscouata	1875	1st term
Joseph-Adolphe Chapleau (Note: Accepted a Cabinet position, an office of profit, triggering by-election, January 24, 1876.)	Conservative	Terrebonne	1867	3rd term
Henri-Gédéon Malhiot (Note: Resigned on appointment as commissioner of the Quebec, Montreal, Ottawa and Occidental Railway, January 28, 1876.)	Conservative	Trois-Rivières	1871	2nd term
Henri-René-Arthur Turcotte (1876)	Independent Conservative	Trois-Rivières	1876	1st term
Émery Lalonde, Sr.	Conservative	Vaudreuil	1871	2nd term
Joseph Daigle	Liberal	Verchères	1871	2nd term
Jonathan Saxton Campbell Würtele	Liberal	Yamaska	1875	1st term

=== By-elections ===
There were thirteen by-elections during the term of the Third Legislature. Cabinet ministers are indicated by italics.

By-elections, 1876-1877
Name	Party	Riding	Reason for Vacancy	By-election Date
George Barnard Baker	Conservative	Missisquoi	Accepted a Cabinet position, an office of profit, triggering by-election; re-elected.	February 10, 1876
Joseph-Adolphe Chapleau	Conservative	Terrebonne	Accepted a Cabinet position, an office of profit, triggering by-election; re-elected.	February 10, 1876
Charles Champagne	Conservative	Deux-Montagnes	Incumbent resigned to take position as Superintendent of Public Instruction.	March 3, 1876
Andrew Kennedy	Conservative	Mégantic	Incumbent resigned to take position as commissioner of the Quebec, Montreal, Ottawa and Occidental Railway.	April 18, 1876
Henri-René-Arthur Turcotte	Independent Conservative	Trois-Rivières	Incumbent resigned to take position as commissioner of the Quebec, Montreal, Ottawa and Occidental Railway.	April 18, 1876
Alexander Cameron	Liberal	Huntingdon	Election annulled; re-elected in by-election.	April 24, 1876
Flavien Dupont	Conservative	Bagot	Incumbent resigned to take position as prothonotary for the judicial district of Montreal.	July 7, 1876
Charles-Édouard Houde	Conservative	Nicolet	Election of incumbent annulled by Superior Court.	August 18, 1876
Louis-Napoléon Fortin	Liberal	Montmagny	Election of incumbent annulled.	November 30, 1876
Joseph-Israël Tarte	Conservative	Bonaventure	Election of incumbent annulled.	February 22, 1877
Joseph Dumont	Liberal	Kamouraska	Incumbent resigned to stand for election to House of Commons	March 19, 1877
Pierre-Étienne Fortin	Conservative	Gaspé	Election annulled; re-elected in by-election.	July 2, 1877
Richard Alleyn	Conservative	Québec-Ouest	Incumbent resigned on appointment to Legislative Council.	December 17, 1877.

== Legislative Council ==
=== Party standings ===
The Conservatives had a strong majority in the Legislative Council throughout the Third Legislature.

Standings at First Session, 1875
Party	Members
Conservatives	22
Liberals	2
Total:	24
Government Majority:	20

=== Members during the Third Legislature ===
The Premier of Quebec is indicated by Bold italics. The Speakers of the Legislative Council are indicated by small caps. Cabinet members are indicated by italics.

Members 1875-1878
Legislative Council Divisions	Member	Party	Term Start	Term End
Alma	Beaudry, Jean-Louis	Conservative	November 2, 1867	June 25, 1886
Bedford	Wood, Thomas	Conservative	November 2, 1867	November 13, 1898
De la Durantaye	Beaubien, Joseph-Octave	Conservative	November 2, 1867	November 7, 1877
De la Durantaye	Vacant		November 8, 1877	May 27, 1878
De la Vallière	Proulx, Jean-Baptiste-Georges	Liberal	November 2, 1867	January 27, 1884
De Lanaudière	Dostaler, Pierre-Eustache	Conservative	November 2, 1867	January 4, 1884
De Lorimier	Rodier, Charles-Séraphin†	Conservative	November 2, 1867	February 3, 1876
De Lorimier	Vacant		February 4, 1876	April 30, 1876
De Lorimier	Laviolette, Joseph-Gaspard	Conservative	May 1, 1876	March 11, 1897
De Salaberry	Starnes, Henry	Liberal	November 2, 1867	March 3, 1896
Grandville	Dionne, Élisée	Conservative	November 2, 1867	August 22, 1892
Gulf	Savage, Thomas	Conservative	November 19, 1873	February 27, 1887
Inkerman	Bryson, George (Sr.)	Conservative	November 2, 1867	January 13, 1900
Kennebec	Richard, Louis†	Conservative	February 5, 1874	November 13, 1876
Kennebec	Vacant		November 14, 1876	October 29, 1877
Kennebec	Gaudet, Joseph	Conservative	October 30, 1877	August 4, 1882
La Salle	Panet, Louis	Conservative	November 2, 1867	May 15, 1884
Lauzon	Chaussegros de Léry, Alexandre-René	Conservative	November 2, 1867	December 19, 1880
Mille-Isles	Lemaire, Félix-Hyacinthe	Conservative	November 2, 1867	December 17, 1879
Montarville	Boucher de Boucherville, Charles-Eugène	Conservative	November 2, 1867	September 10, 1915
Repentigny	Archambeault, Louis	Conservative	November 2, 1867	June 6, 1888
Rigaud	Prud'homme, Eustache	Conservative	November 2, 1867	April 28, 1888
Rougemont	Fraser de Berry, John†	Conservative	November 2, 1867	November 15, 1876
Rougemont	Vacant		November 16, 1876	October 29, 1877
Rougemont	Boucher de la Bruère, Pierre	Conservative	October 30, 1877	April 5, 1895
Saurel	Roy, Pierre-Euclide	Conservative	November 19, 1873	October 31, 1882
Shawinigan	Ross, John Jones	Conservative	November 2, 1867	May 4, 1901
Stadacona	Sharples, John (Sr.)†	Conservative	February 27, 1874	December 19, 1876
Stadacona	Vacant		December 20, 1876	October 29, 1877
Stadacona	Hearn, John	Conservative	October 30, 1877	February 19, 1892
The Laurentides	Gingras, Jean-Élie	Conservative	November 2, 1867	December 10, 1887
Victoria	Ferrier, James	Conservative	November 2, 1867	May 30, 1888
Wellington	Webb, William Hoste	Conservative	October 7, 1875	March 11, 1887

Vacancies of less than one month are not shown.
† Died in office.

== Executive Council during Third Legislature ==
There were two different ministries during the term of the Third Legislature, under Premiers Boucher de Boucherville (1875-1878) and Joly de Lotbinière (1878).

=== Third Quebec Ministry: Boucher de Boucherville Cabinet (1875-1878) ===
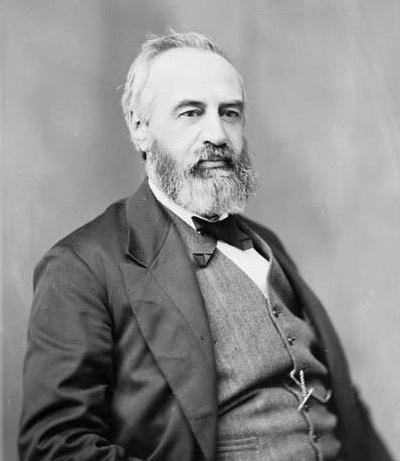
Charles Boucher de Boucherville, Third Premier of Quebec, 1874-1878

Following the 1875 election, Boucher de Boucherville made some changes to the Cabinet, but largely retained the previous composition.

Members of the Executive Council: 1875-1878
Position	Minister	Term start	Term end
Premier and President of the Executive Council	Charles-Eugène Boucher de Boucherville*	1875	1878
Agriculture and Public Works	Pierre Garneau	1875	1876
Agriculture and Public Works	Charles-Eugène Boucher de Boucherville*	1876	1878
Attorney General	Levi Ruggles Church	1875	1876
Attorney General	Auguste-Réal Angers	1876	1878
Crown lands	Henri-Gédéon Malhiot	1875	1876
Crown lands	Pierre Garneau	1876	1878
Public Instruction	Charles-Eugène Boucher de Boucherville*	1875	1876
Secretary and Registrar	Charles-Eugène Boucher de Boucherville*	1875	1876
Secretary and Registrar	Joseph-Adolphe Chapleau	1876	1878
Solicitor General	Auguste-Réal Angers	1875	1876
Solicitor General	George Barnard Baker	1876	1878
Speaker of the Legislative Council	Félix-Hyacinthe Lemaire*	1875	1876
Speaker of the Legislative Council	John Jones Ross*	1876	1878
Treasurer	Joseph Gibb Robertson	1875	1876
Treasurer	Levi Ruggles Church	1876	1878
Ministers without portfolio	John Jones Ross*	1876	
Ministers without portfolio	George Barnard Baker	1876	
Ministers without portfolio	Joseph-Adolphe Chapleau	1876	
* Members of the Legislative Council

=== Fourth Quebec Ministry: Joly de Lotbinière Cabinet (1878 - 1879) ===
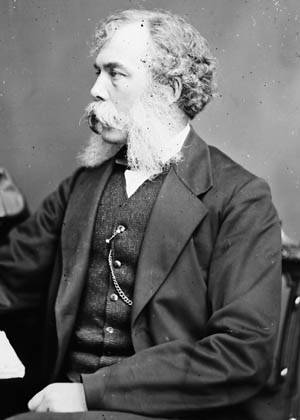
Henri-Gustave Joly de Lotbinière, Fourth Premier of Quebec

Following the dismissal of Boucher de Boucherville in 1878, the Lieutenant Governor appointed Henri-Gustave Joly de Lotbinière as Premier. Because of his lack of majority in the Assembly, Joly de Lotbinière found it necessary to appoint two individuals to Cabinet who did not initially have seats in the Assembly: David Alexander Ross as Attorney General and François Langelier as Commissioner of Crown lands. The only Cabinet member from the Legislative Council was Henry Starnes, the Speaker. Joly de Lotbinière then immediately advised the Lieutenant Governor to dissolve the Legislative Assembly and call a general election. Returned to office, Joly de Lotbinière initially retained the ministers in the same positions, but carried out a Cabinet shuffle the next year, in 1879. In 1879, Joly de Lotbinière appointed Honoré Mercier to cabinet, even though Mercier did not initially have a seat in the Legislative Assembly.

Members of the Executive Council: 1878-1879
Position	Minister	Term start	Term end
Premier and President of the Executive Council	Henri-Gustave Joly de Lotbinière	1878	1879
Agriculture and Public Works	Henri-Gustave Joly de Lotbinière	1878	1879
Attorney General	David Alexander Ross**	1878	1879
Crown lands	François Langelier**	1878	1879
Crown lands	Félix-Gabriel Marchand	1879	
Secretary and Registrar	Félix-Gabriel Marchand	1878	1879
Secretary and Registrar	Alexandre Chauveau	1879	
Solicitor General	Alexandre Chauveau	1878	1879
Solicitor General	Honoré Mercier**	1879	
Speaker of the Legislative Council	Henry Starnes*	1878	1879
Treasurer	Pierre Bachand	1878	1879
Treasurer	François Langelier	1879	
* Member of the Legislative Council; **Appointed minister without seat in the Legislature

== Leaders of the Opposition ==
There were two leaders of the Opposition during the Third Legislature. Joly de Lotbinière was leader for most of the term of the legislature, from 1875 to 1878. When Joly de Lotbinière was appointed premier in 1878, Boucher de Boucherville technically became the leader of the Opposition, but he did not sit in that capacity, as the legislature was not in session. Joly de Lotbinière called an election two weeks after being appointed premier, without any sittings of the legislature.

== Legislative sessions ==
The legislature had three annual sessions:

- First session: November 4, 1875 to December 24, 1875, with thirty-eight sitting days.
- Second session: November 10, 1876 to December 28, 1876, with thirty-five sitting days.
- Third and final session: December 19, 1877 to March 9, 1878, with forty-two sitting days.

The legislature was dissolved on March 22, 1878.
