= Edward John Hemming =

Canadian politician

Member of the Legislative Assembly of Quebec for Drummond-Arthabaska
- In office 1867–1871
- Succeeded by: Wilfrid Laurier

Personal details
- Born: 30 August 1823 London, England
- Died: 17 September 1905 (aged 82) Knowlton, Quebec
- Party: Conservative

Edward John Hemming (30 August 1823 – 17 September 1905) was a lawyer, politician and author.

Born in London, Hemming was the seventh and youngest child of Henry Keene Hemming (1793–1847) and Sophia Wirgman (1785–1870), and a brother of George Wirgman Hemming. After finishing his studies at Clapham Grammar School in south-western London, he was commissioned as a midshipman in the East India Company Merchant Navy, serving from 1836 to 1845. After this period at sea, he entered into business with his father who ran his own farm and was land agent to William Cavendish, 6th Duke of Devonshire for the Lismore Castle estate in Ireland.

In 1851, Hemming left Ireland on the invitation of his cousin, Christopher Dunkin, and came to Montreal to study law at McGill College. He was admitted to the bar of Lower Canada on 7 May 1855. He practised law in the offices of Alexander Hutchison Lunn at Montreal until 1858 when he moved to Drummondville and established a large farm, as did his father. In the same year, he married Sophia Louisa Robinson and they went on to have 8 children. He was joined at the farm by his eldest brother, Henry Hemming, in 1864. In 1899, he moved to Knowlton. Aged 82, and having celebrated his golden wedding anniversary with a family reunion sevens week earlier, he died and was buried in the cemetery at Knowlton.

== Political activities ==
Hemming was elected to the Legislative Assembly of Quebec as a Conservative in the Drummond-Arthabaska riding in 1867, but was defeated in his re-election bid in 1871 by Wilfrid Laurier of the Liberal party. He was an active member of the Church of England, working on religious education in schools and serving as marguillier of St. George's Church in Drummondville. He was a longtime delegate to the diocesan and Synod of Quebec.

== Writing ==
In 1853, he published Negligence of Chemistry by the Farmers followed in 1856 by The Digested Index to the Statutes in Force in Lower Canada.
