= Pierre Gélinas =

Canadian politician

Member of the Legislative Assembly of Quebec for Richelieu
- In office 1869–1871
- Preceded by: Joseph Beaudreau
- Succeeded by: Joseph-Adolphe Dorion

Personal details
- Born: 14 August 1818 Yamachiche, Lower Canada
- Died: 3 April 1911 (aged 92) Saint-Aimé, Quebec
- Party: Conservative

Pierre Gélinas (14 August 1818 – 3 April 1911) was a member of the Legislative Assembly of Quebec.

He was defeated as a Conservative candidate in Richelieu electoral district for the House of Commons of Canada in the first Canadian federal election in 1867. He was elected as a Conservative to the Legislative Assembly of Quebec in an 1869 by-election in Richelieu, but did not run for re-election in 1871.
