= Ministry of Agriculture, Fisheries and Food (Quebec) =

Government department in Quebec

The Ministry of Agriculture, Fisheries and Food (French: Ministre de l'Agriculture, des Pêcheries et de l'Alimentation) is a government department in the Canadian province of Quebec. The ministry operates several programs in animal and vegetable production, fishing and commercial aquaculture, food processing and distribution, and storage and retail.

The ministry is overseen by the Minister of Agriculture, Fisheries and Food. The current minister is Bernard Sévigny.
