= Thomas Savage (Quebec politician) =

Quebec politician, merchant and shipowner

Thomas Savage M.L.C.

Member of the Legislative Council of Quebec
- In office November 19, 1873 – February 26, 1887
- Preceded by: John LeBoutillier
- Succeeded by: David Alexander Ross
- Constituency: Gulf Division

Personal details
- Born: September 16, 1808 Jersey, Channel Islands
- Died: November 21, 1887 (aged 79) Anse-du-Cap, Quebec
- Party: Conservative
- Spouse: Julie Colin-Laliberté
- Profession: Businessman and shipowner

Thomas Savage (September 16, 1808 - November 21, 1887) was a merchant, shipowner and politician in the province of Quebec, Canada. He served in the Legislative Council of Quebec, the upper house of the Legislature of Quebec.

Savage was born on Jersey in the Channel Islands, the son of Jean Savage and Elizabeth Degnesley. Raised at Jersey, at some point he emigrated to Canada.

He became a merchant and ship owner at l'Anse-du-Cap, in the Gaspé region. He was a major in the local militia. On April 4, 1847, he married Julie Colin-Laliberté.

Savage stood for election to the Legislative Assembly of the Province of Canada in the general election of 1863 but was defeated. In 1873, he was appointed to the Legislative Council for the Gulf division, as a supporter of the Conservative party of Quebec. He held that position for nearly fourteen years until his resignation in February 1887.

Savage died at l'Anse-du-Cap in November, 1887.
