= Joseph Beaudreau =

Canadian politician

Member of the Legislative Assembly of Quebec for Richelieu
- In office 1867–1869
- Succeeded by: Pierre Gélinas

Personal details
- Born: March 17, 1826 Sorel, Lower Canada
- Died: October 5, 1869 (aged 43) Saint-Aimé (Massueville), Quebec
- Party: Conservative

Joseph Beaudreau (March 17, 1826 – October 5, 1869) was a farmer and political figure in Quebec. He represented Richelieu in the Legislative Assembly of the Province of Canada from 1861 to 1863 and again in the Legislative Assembly of Quebec from 1867 to 1869 as a Conservative member.

He was born in Sorel, Lower Canada, the son of Pierre Beaudreau, dit Graveline and Marie-Anne Dupré. He operated a farm at Saint-Aimé. Beaudreau was married twice: to Élisabeth Perron in 1845 and to Marie Moreault in 1867. He served as mayor of Saint-Aimé. He was defeated when he ran for reelection to the legislative assembly for the Province of Canada in 1863. Beaudreau died in office at Saint-Aimé at the age of 43.
