= Pierre Garneau =

Canadian politician

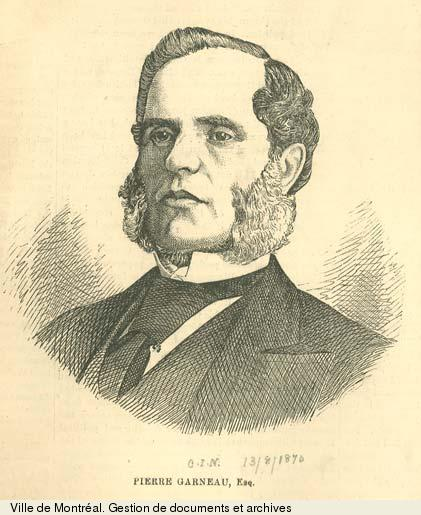

Mayor of Quebec City
- In office 1870–1874
- Preceded by: Adolphe Guillet dit Tourangeau
- Succeeded by: Owen Murphy

Member of the Legislative Assembly of Quebec for Québec-Comté
- In office 1873–1878
- Preceded by: Pierre-Joseph-Olivier Chauveau
- Succeeded by: David Alexander Ross

Member of the Legislative Council of Quebec for De la Durantaye
- In office 1887–1904
- Preceded by: Édouard Rémillard
- Succeeded by: Édouard Burroughs Garneau

Personal details
- Born: 8 May 1823 Cap-Santé, Lower Canada
- Died: 23 June 1905 (aged 82) Quebec City, Quebec

Pierre Garneau (8 May 1823 – 23 June 1905) was a Canadian businessman and politician.

== Biography ==
Born and educated in Cap-Santé, Lower Canada, the son of François-Xavier Garneau and Julie-Henriette Gignac, Garneau moved to Quebec City in 1839 to work as a clerk for a fancy-goods merchant. He eventually worked for his own importing wholesaler called Têtu et Garneau. He would later work for P. Garneau et Frère, and later still for P. Garneau, Fils et Compagnie.

In 1870, he was elected as an alderman for Saint-Pierre ward. From 1870 to 1874 he was mayor of Quebec City. He was elected by acclamation to the Legislative Assembly of Quebec for the electoral district of Québec-Comté in an 1873 by-election. In 1874, he was the commissioner of agriculture and public works in the cabinet of Charles-Eugène Boucher de Boucherville. In 1876, he was appointed commissioner of crown lands. A Conservative, he was re-elected in the 1875 general election. He was defeated in the 1878 general election and was re-elected in the 1881 general election. He was defeated in 1886. In 1887, he was appointed to the Legislative Council of Quebec for the division of La Durantaye. He resigned in 1904.

He was a director of the Quebec and Gulf Ports Steamship Company, and La Banque Nationale; president of the Quebec Street Railway Company; a government director of the North Shore Railway; and a member of the Quebec Board of Trade. He was a member of the canal commission in 1870.
