= Tanneries scandal =

1874 Québécois scandal

The Tanneries scandal was a scandal implicating the government of the Province of Quebec, which led to the resignation of Conservative premier, Gédéon Ouimet, in September 1874.

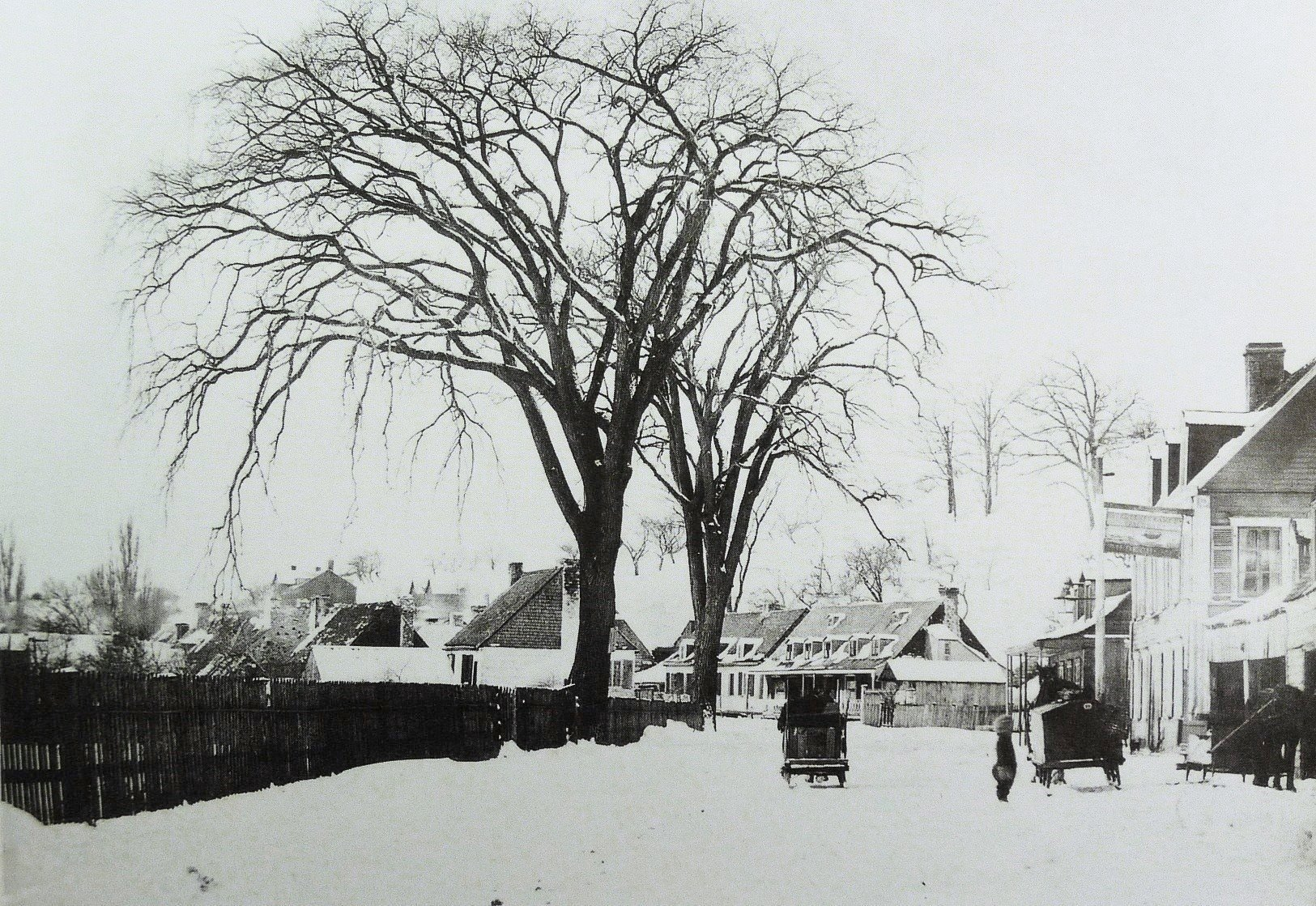
Les Tanneries in 1861

On July 16, 1874, the Montreal Herald announced that the provincial government had exchanged land at Les Tanneries (now the Saint-Henri district of Montreal) worth over $200,000 for a farm on the Coteau Saint-Pierre of west Montreal valued at less than $40,000. An organizer for the Conservative Party, Arthur Dansereau, was alleged to have received $65,000 in commissions in the deal. Louis Archambeault, the commissioner of public works, was also implicated in the affair. George Irvine, John Jones Ross and Joseph Gibb Robertson, the three English-speaking members of the cabinet, resigned, and Charles-Eugène Boucher de Boucherville replaced Ouimet as premier.

Ouimet was reelected to his seat in the assembly in the general election that followed in 1875. Despite the outrage of the public over the affair, the provincial Conservatives were able to retain power, mainly because of the continuing support of the party by the Catholic clergy of the province. Later that year, judge Francis Godschall Johnson found no evidence of fraud or conspiracy. The commission investigating the affair did not comment on the guilt or innocence of any cabinet member but recommended for the land exchange that had triggered the scandal to be cancelled.

Although the scandal did not result in a change of the ruling party in the province, it solidified the affiliation between the Catholic Church and the provincial Conservatives.
