= Richmond-Wolfe (provincial electoral district) =

Coordinates: 45.65°N 72.13°W

Quebec electoral district

Defunct provincial electoral district
- Legislature: National Assembly of Quebec
- District created: 1867
- District abolished: 1890
- First contested: 1867
- Last contested: 1886

Richmond-Wolfe (or Richmond et Wolfe) was a former provincial electoral district in the province of Quebec, Canada. It was created for the 1867 election (and an electoral district of that name already, existed earlier, in the Legislative Assembly of the Province of Canada). Before its dissolution, its final election was the 1886 election. However, the provincial electoral district disappeared in the 1890 election and its successors were Richmond and Wolfe.

== Members of the Legislative Assembly ==
- Jacques Picard, Conservative Party (1867–1890)
