= Drummond-Arthabaska (provincial electoral district) =

Coordinates: 46.186°N 71.736°W

Quebec electoral district

Defunct provincial electoral district
- Legislature: National Assembly of Quebec
- District created: 1867
- District abolished: 1890
- First contested: 1867
- Last contested: 1886

Drummond-Arthabaska (or Drummond et Arthabaska) was a former provincial electoral district in the province of Quebec, Canada. It was created for the 1867 election (and an electoral district of that name existed earlier in the Legislative Assembly of the Province of Canada). Its final election was in 1886. It disappeared in the 1890 election and its successor electoral districts were Drummond and Arthabaska.

== Members of the Legislative Assembly ==
1. Edward John Hemming, Conservative Party (1867–1871)
2. Wilfrid Laurier, Liberal (1871–1874)
3. William John Watts, Conservative Party – Conservative Independent – Liberal (1874–1885)
4. Joseph-Éna Girouard, Liberal (1886–1890)
