= 1871 Quebec general election =

Canadian provincial election

- June – July, 1871

65 seats in the 2nd Legislative Assembly of Quebec 33 seats needed for a majority
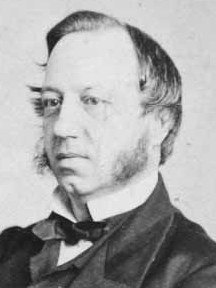

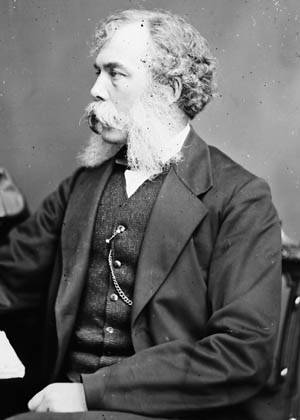
	First party	Second party
Leader	Pierre-Joseph-Olivier Chauveau	Henri-Gustave Joly de Lotbinière
Party	Conservative	Liberal
Leader since	1867	1869
Leader's seat	Quebec County	Lotbinière
Last election	51 seats, 53.5%	12 seats, 35.4%
Seats won	46	19
Seat change	▼5	▲7
Popular vote	31,168	23,760
Percentage	51.7%	39.4%
Swing	▼1.8%	▲4.0%
- Map of the results by riding
Premier before election
Pierre-Joseph-Olivier Chauveau
Conservative Party of Quebec
Premier after election
Pierre-Joseph-Olivier Chauveau
Conservative Party of Quebec

The 1871 Quebec general election was held in June and July 1871 to elect members of the Second Legislature for the province of Quebec, Canada. The Quebec Conservative Party, led by Premier Pierre-Joseph-Olivier Chauveau, was re-elected, defeating the Quebec Liberal Party, led by Henri-Gustave Joly de Lotbinière.

== Franchise and candidacy ==
=== Right to vote ===
The right to vote in elections to the Legislative Assembly was not universal. Only male British subjects (by birth or naturalisation), aged 21 and older, were eligible to vote, and only if they met a property qualification. For residents of cities and towns, the qualification was being the owner, tenant or occupant of real property assessed at three hundred dollars, or at an assessed yearly value of thirty dollars. For residents of townships and parishes, the requirements were either an assessment of two hundred dollars, or an assessed yearly value of twenty dollars.

Women were expressly prohibited from voting, "for any Electoral Division whatever".

Judges and many municipal and provincial officials were also barred from voting, particularly officials with duties relating to public revenue. Election officials were also barred from voting.

=== Qualification for the Legislative Assembly ===
Candidates for the Legislative Assembly had to meet a significant property qualification. A candidate had to own real property in the Province of Canada, worth at least £500 in British sterling, over and above any encumbrances on the property.

== Electoral map ==
The Legislative Assembly was composed of sixty-five single-member constituencies or "ridings". The 1871 election was conducted under the pre-Confederation electoral map of the former Province of Canada. That map had set the boundaries for the sixty-five constituencies of Canada East, which became Quebec. The British North America Act, 1867 provided that the pre-Confederation electoral map would continue to be used for Quebec elections until altered by the Legislature of Quebec. The map of the sixty-five constituencies was also to be used in federal elections, until altered by Parliament.

== Conduct of the election ==
The 1867 election was conducted under the election laws of the Province of Canada, which had been continued until altered by the Legislature of Quebec. The electoral process of the Province of Canada in turn had been based on the traditional British electoral process, without a secret ballot. Instead, elections were public affairs, with each voter publicly stating the name of the candidate they voted for.

The election process began with writs of election issued by the Clerk of the Crown in Chancery, one for each constituency (also called a "riding"). The writ was directed to the Returning Officer for each constituency and required the Returning Officer to hold a public nomination of candidates, and if necessary a poll, on days to be chosen by the Returning Officer.

On the nomination day, the Returning Officer held a public meeting "in the open air", at a central place in the constituency, and in a place where the public had access, such as in front of a town hall or church in the constituency. The Returning Officer addressed the assembled members of the public from a platform, called a "husting", and called for nominations. If only one person was nominated, the Returning Officer would close the nominations and declare that person elected. If more than one person was nominated, the Returning Officer would grant a poll, to be held at a future date, chosen by the Returning Officer.

On polling day, polls would be held across the constituency. The polls were in held in the open air, or in buildings close to the highways, with free access by the public. It was prohibited to hold a poll in a "tavern or place of public entertainment". The Returning Officer would appoint a Deputy Returning Officer for each polling place, normally the town clerk or other municipal official. Each Deputy Returning Officer would have a poll book. Qualified voters would appear before the Deputy Returning Officer and declare how they voted. The Deputy Returning Officer would record each voter's vote in the poll book. At the close of the polls, the Deputy Returning Officers would deliver the poll books to the Returning Officer. The Returning Officer would then total all of the polls in public, at the place where the nominations had occurred, declare which candidate was elected, and issue a proclamation declaring the election closed. The Returning Officer would then send a report of the election with the return of the writ to the Clerk of the Crown in Chancery, within fifteen days after the closing of the election.

The elections for the sixty-five provincial constituencies were not all conducted on the same day. The writs of election for each constituency gave the Returning Officer the discretion to set the original nomination day, and the subsequent date for the polling, if more than one candidate were nominated. The 1867 election was spread across the months of August and September.

== Results ==
The election resulted in a Conservative victory. The Conservatives were maintained in office with a strong majority, although a somewhat reduced seat count. The Liberals improved their standings from twelve seats to nineteen.

Elections to the 2nd Legislative Assembly of Quebec (1871)
Political party	Party leader	MLAs				Votes		
Political party	Party leader	Candidates (Note: 27 were acclaimed: 22 Conservatives, 5 Liberals)	1867	1871	+/-	#	%	+/-
Conservative	Pierre-Joseph-Olivier Chauveau	59	51	46	5▼	31,168	51.69%	1.78▼
Liberal	Henri-Gustave Joly de Lotbinière	37	12	19	7▲	23,760	39.41%	3.96▲
Independent		2	1	–	1▼	823	1.36%	New (Note: Pierre-Alexis Tremblay in Chicoutimi-Saguenay had previously been acclaimed, and was subsequently re-elected as a Liberal.)
Independent-Conservative		11	–	–		4,545	7.54%	1.90▼
Independent-Liberal		–	–	–		Did not campaign		
Vacant			1	–	1▼			
Total		109	65	65		60,296	100.00%	
Registered voters / turnout (Note: in the ridings without acclaimed candidates, the effective turnout was 58.89%)						172,369	34.98%	11.86▼

Seats and popular vote by party
Party	Seats	Votes	Change (pp)
Conservative	46 / 65	51.69%	-1.78
Liberal	19 / 65	39.41%	3.96
Other	0 / 65	8.90%	-2.18

=== Seats that changed hands ===
Elections to the 2nd Legislative Assembly of Quebec – seats won/lost by party, 1867–1871
Party	1867	Gain from (loss to)								1871
Party	1867	Con		Lib		Ind		Vac		1871
Conservative	51			2	(8)			1		46
Liberal	12	8	(2)			1				19
Independent	1				(1)					–
Vacant	1		(1)							–
Total	65	8	(3)	2	(9)	1	–	1	–	65

There were 12 seats that changed allegiance in the election:

Conservative to Liberal

- Berthier
- Chambly
- Charlevoix
- Drummond et Arthabaska
- Maskinongé
- Montréal Centre
- Shefford
- Verchères

Liberal to Conservative

- Bonaventure
- Yamaska

Independent to Liberal

- Chicoutimi et Saguenay

Vacant to Conservative

- Kamouraska

== See also ==
- List of premiers of Quebec
- Politics of Quebec
- Timeline of Quebec history
- List of political parties in Quebec
- 2nd Quebec Legislature
