= Josiah Sandford Brigham =

Canadian politician

Member of the Legislative Assembly of Quebec for Missisquoi
- In office 1867–1875
- Succeeded by: George Barnard Baker

Personal details
- Born: August 1818 St. Albans, Vermont
- Died: June 10, 1882 (aged 63) Philipsburg, Quebec
- Party: Conservative

Josiah Sandford Brigham (August, 1818 – June 10, 1892) was an American-born physician and political figure in Quebec. He represented Missisquoi in the Legislative Assembly of Quebec from 1867 to 1875 as a Conservative.

He was born in St. Albans, Vermont, the son of Elbridge Brigham, and was educated at the St. Albans Academy, at Vermont Medical College and McGill University. He was admitted to practise as a doctor in 1848 and practised in Philipsburg. He was also owner of several sawmills. Brigham served as governor for the College of Physicians and Surgeons of Lower Canada. He was mayor of Philipsburg and warden for Missisquoi County. Brigham ran for reelection in 1881 but was defeated. He died in Philipsburg at the age of 73.
