= Pierre-Euclide Roy =

19th-century Canadian business man and politician

Pierre-Euclide Roy M.L.C.

Member of the Legislative Council of Quebec for Saurel
- In office November 13, 1873 – October 31, 1882
- Preceded by: David Morrison Armstrong
- Succeeded by: Joseph-Adolphe Dorion

Personal details
- Born: November 2, 1826 Saint-Roch-de-l'Achigan
- Died: October 31, 1882 (aged 55) Saint-Pie, Quebec
- Party: Conservative Party of Quebec
- Spouse(s): (1) Émilie Aurélie Auger (1848) (2) Emma Davignon
- Occupation: Businessman

Pierre-Euclide Roy (November 2, 1826 – October 1, 1882) was a Quebec businessman and politician.

He was born at Saint-Roch-de-l'Achigan, close to L'Assomption. He was the son of Pierre-Octave Roy, a merchant, and Josephte Beaudry.

Roy became a merchant at Saint-Pie, near Saint-Hyacinthe. He was also the treasurer of the Phillipsburg, Farnham and Yamaska Railway Company.

On March 6, 1848, he married Émilie Aurélie Auger. He later married Emma Davignon.

Roy was appointed to the Legislative Council of Quebec on November 19, 1873, representing the division of Saurel. He supported the Conservative Party of Quebec.

Roy died in office at Saint-Pie, on October 31, 1882.
