= Pierre-Joseph-Olivier Chauveau =

1st Premier of Quebec (1867–1873)

The Honourable Pierre-Joseph-Olivier Chauveau
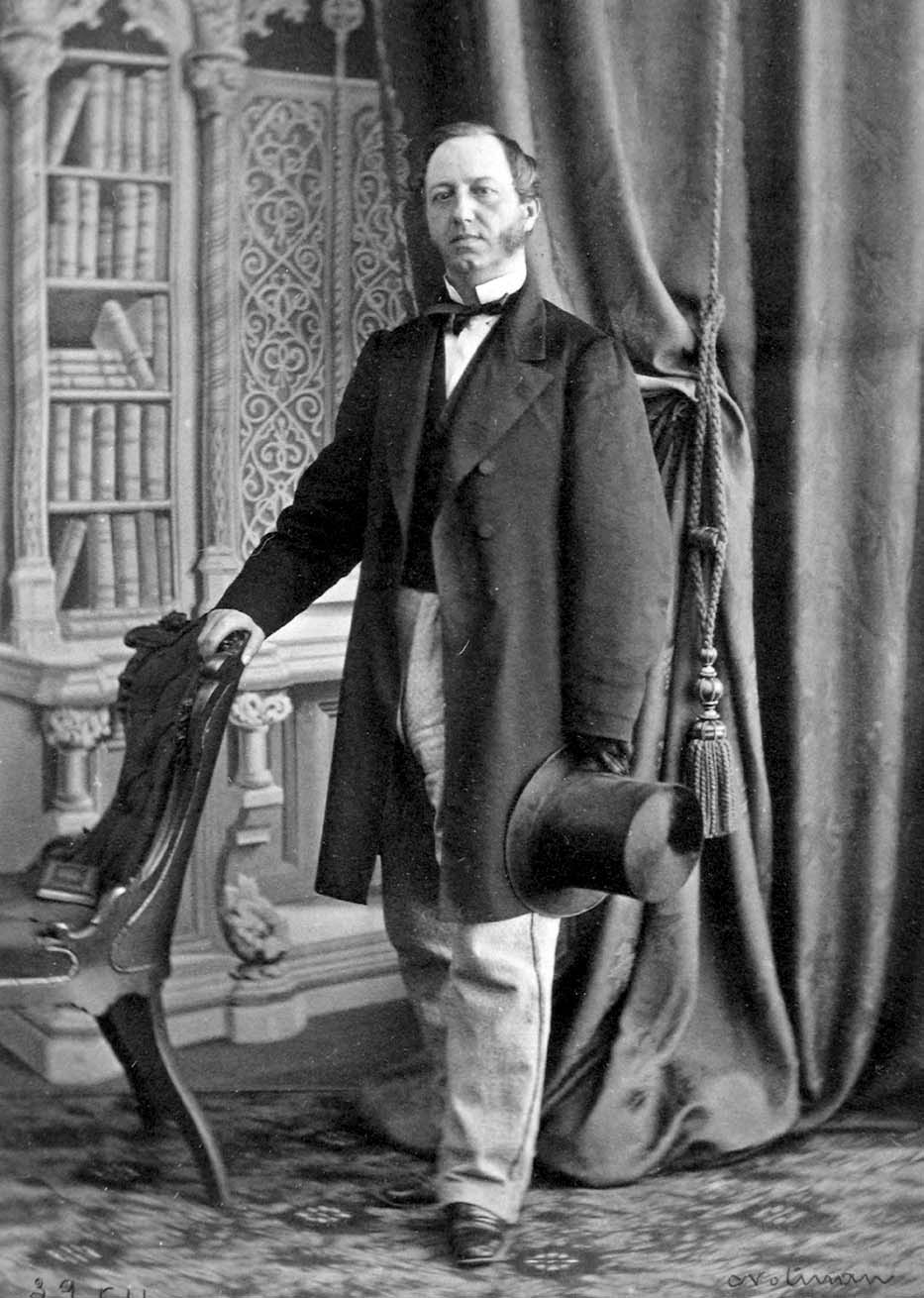
- Chauveau in 1862

1st Premier of Quebec
- In office July 15, 1867 – February 25, 1873
- Monarch: Victoria
- Lieutenant Governor: Narcisse-Fortunat Belleau; René-Édouard Caron
- Preceded by: None (new position)
- Succeeded by: Gédéon Ouimet

Member of the Legislative Assembly of the Province of Canada for Quebec County
- In office 1844–1855
- Preceded by: John Neilson
- Succeeded by: François Évanturel

Member of the Legislative Assembly of Quebec for Québec-Comté
- In office September 1, 1867 – February 25, 1873
- Succeeded by: Pierre Garneau

Member of the Canadian Parliament for Quebec County
- In office September 20, 1867 – January 22, 1874
- Succeeded by: Adolphe-Philippe Caron

Senator for Stadacona, Quebec
- In office February 20, 1873 – January 8, 1874
- Preceded by: Joseph-Édouard Cauchon
- Succeeded by: Pierre Baillargeon

Speaker of the Senate of Canada
- In office February 21, 1873 – January 8, 1874
- Preceded by: Joseph-Édouard Cauchon
- Succeeded by: David Christie

Personal details
- Born: May 30, 1820 Charlesbourg, Lower Canada
- Died: April 4, 1890 (aged 69) Quebec City, Quebec
- Party: Conservative
- Spouse: Marie-Louise-Flore Masse

Pierre-Joseph-Olivier Chauveau (French pronunciation: [pjɛʁ ʒozɛf ɔlivje ʃovo]; May 30, 1820 – April 4, 1890) was a Canadian lawyer and politician. Chauveau was the first premier of Quebec, following the establishment of Canada in 1867. Appointed to the office in 1867 as the leader of the Conservative Party, he won the provincial elections of 1867 and 1871. He resigned as premier and his seat in the provincial Legislative Assembly in 1873.

Chauveau was also active in federal politics, being member of the House of Commons from 1867 to 1873, and then a member of the Senate for a year. After only a year in the Senate he sought re-election to the Commons in the general election of 1874, but was defeated. He then retired from politics.

Chauveau had a life-long interest in literature and public affairs. He was the author of a novel and many short columns and letters on the political situation in Lower Canada. As a young man, he opposed the union of the Lower Canada and Upper Canada into the single Province of Canada, which he saw as primarily benefitting the financial sector, which was largely dominated by those of British stock. However, he gradually came to support Louis-Hippolyte LaFontaine, who argued that the union gave an opportunity for French-Canadians to acquire political power, through the establishment of responsible government.

Chauveau also had a strong interest in education. From 1855 to 1867, he was the Superintendent of the Bureau of Education for Canada East (as Lower Canada was known in the Province of Canada), and was responsible for a number of innovations in education. Following his retirement from politics, he held several different positions, including dean of the faculty of law at the Université Laval.

== Early life and family ==
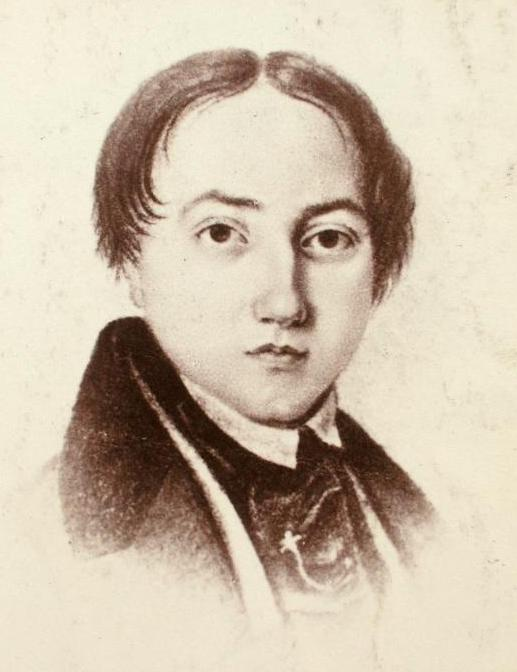
Chauveau as a young man

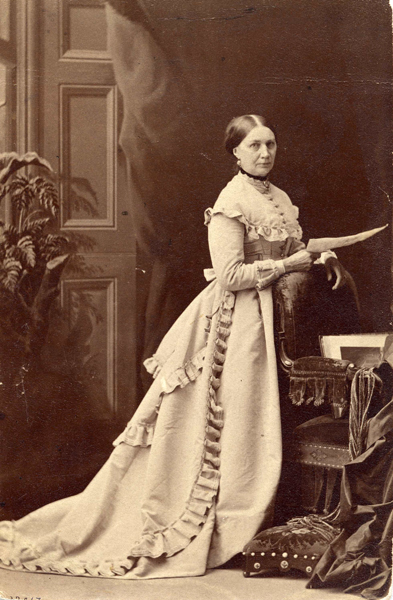
Marie-Louise-Flore Chauveau in later life

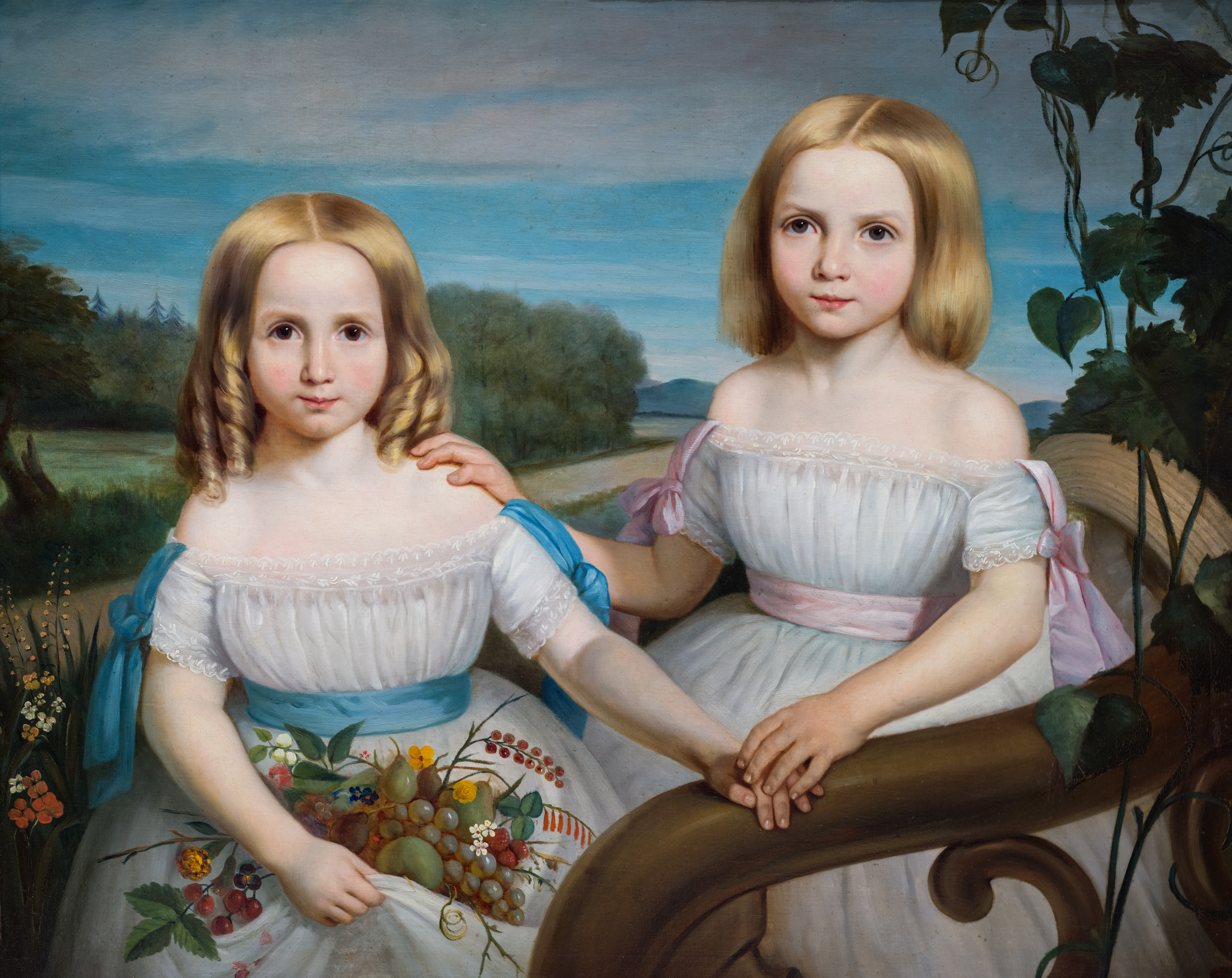
Olympe and Flore, two of the Chauveau daughters

Chauveau was born in Charlesbourg, near Quebec City, in a long-established local family. He was in the fifth generation of the Chauveau family in Charlesbourg, descended from a settler in the early 18th century. His father died when he was young, so he was raised by his mother and his maternal grandfather, a wealthy merchant in Quebec City. From 1829 to 1837, he attended the Petit Séminaire de Québec, where he gained a reputation as an excellent student, with strong literary interests. Two of his fellow students were Elzéar-Alexandre Taschereau, who went on to become Archbishop of Quebec, and Luc Letellier de St-Just, who was eventually appointed Lieutenant Governor of Quebec.

In 1840, he married Marie-Louise-Flore Masse, with whom he had seven children. One of his sons, Alexandre Chauveau, became a provincial politician in his own right.

One of his great-great-great-grandsons, Thomas Mulcair, was a cabinet minister in the Quebec government of Jean Charest. Mulcair was subsequently leader of the federal New Democratic Party and Leader of the Opposition in the federal House of Commons.

== Legal career ==
Chauveau early on considered entering the priesthood, but eventually decided to follow a career as a lawyer, practising in Quebec City. He initially articled with his maternal uncle, Louis-David Roy, who was in partnership with André-Rémi Hamel, the Attorney General of Lower Canada. He finished his articles with George Okill Stuart Jr., one of the leading lawyers in Quebec City. His time with Stuart enabled him to greatly improve his command of English. He then was taken into partnership with Roy when Hamel was appointed to the bench. When Roy was later appointed to the bench, Chauveau entered into partnership with Philippe Baby Casgrain. Although Chauveau was a good lawyer, the practice of law did not provide him with the level of income he desired.

== Literary and patriotic interests ==
Chauveau took an active part in the intellectual and patriotic circles in Quebec City. In 1838 and 1839, he wrote two poems celebrating the Patriotes of the Lower Canada Rebellion, which were published in the newspaper Le Canadien. From 1841 to 1855, he contributed letters to the New York newspaper, Le Courrier des États-Unis, commenting on the political situation in Canada from the French-Canadian perspective.

In 1853, Chauveau published a novel, Charles Guérin: Roman de moeurs canadiennes. The next year, he was one of the collaborators in La Pléiade rouge: Biographies humoristiques.

Chaveau was also active in literary and patriotic organisations. He was one of the co-founders of the Société Saint-Jean-Baptiste of Quebec City in 1842 and of the Société canadienne d'études littéraires et scientifiques en 1843. Also in 1843, he was president of the Société littéraire et historique de Québec. He supported the Comité constitutionnel de la réforme et du progrès, founded at Quebec City in 1846. He was a member of the Institut canadien de Québec, serving as president in 1851 and 1852, and was vice-president of the Association de la bibliothèque de Québec.

== Political career ==
=== Province of Canada ===
He was elected to the Legislative Assembly of the Province of Canada in 1844, and reelected in 1848, 1851, and 1854. He served as solicitor-general of Lower Canada, without a seat in cabinet, from 1851 to 1853. Served in Cabinet as Provincial Secretary 1853-1854. From 1855 to 1867, he was superintendent of the bureau of Education.

=== Premier of Quebec ===
In 1867, he was elected to the Legislative Assembly of Quebec in Québec-Comté electoral district and headed a Conservative government as the first Premier of Quebec. As the first premier, he had the responsibility of establishing the institutions of government in the new province. He was also the Minister of Education and Provincial Secretary.

In 1873, Chauveau resigned his seat in the Legislative Assembly of Quebec and as premier, to accept an appointment to the Senate of Canada.

=== Federal politics ===
In 1867, in addition to holding his seat in the Legislative Assembly, Chauveau was also elected to the first House of Commons, an example of the dual mandate, which was originally permitted in Canada. He was simultaneously the federal Member of Parliament (MP) for the federal riding of Quebec County and the provincial member for the provincial riding of Québec-Comté. Chauveau was a member of the federal Liberal-Conservative government of Sir John A. Macdonald.

In 1873, Chauveau resigned his federal and provincial seats, as well his office of premier, when he was appointed as Speaker of the Senate by the Macdonald government.

Chauveau held his position in the Senate for less than a year. In the 1874 general election, he sought to be re-elected to the House of Commons. He resigned from the Senate on January 8, 1874 and ran unsuccessfully as a candidate for Member of Parliament in the riding of Charlevoix.

After his defeat in the 1874 election, he retired from politics.

== Later life ==
In 1878, he became professor of Roman law at Université Laval. He died on April 4, 1890 in Quebec City and was buried at the Chapelle des Ursulines in Quebec City.

== Publications ==
- P.J.O. Chauveau, Charles Guerin: roman de mœurs canadiennes; originally published at Montreal, 1853; published electronically by La Bibliothèque électronique du Québec, Collection Littérature québécoise, Volume 76 : version 2.0.
- Works by or about Pierre-Joseph-Olivier Chauveau at the Internet Archive

== Archives ==
There is a Pierre-Joseph-Olivier Chauveau collection at Library and Archives Canada.

== Electoral record ==
1867 Canadian federal election: Quebec County/Comté de Québec
Party	Candidate	Votes
Conservative	Pierre-Joseph-Olivier Chauveau	acclaimed
Source: Canadian Elections Database

1872 Canadian federal election: Quebec County/Comté de Québec
Party	Candidate	Votes
Conservative	Pierre-Joseph-Olivier Chauveau	1,415
Unknown	M. Hearn	316
Source: Canadian Elections Database

Professional and academic associations
Preceded by John William Dawson	President of the Royal Society of Canada; 1883–1884	Succeeded by Thomas Sterry Hunt
