= Jacques Picard =

Canadian politician

Member of the Legislative Assembly of Quebec for Richmond-Wolfe
- In office 1867–1890
- Succeeded by: District was abolished in 1890

Member of the Legislative Assembly of Quebec for Wolfe
- In office 1890–1892
- Preceded by: District was created in 1890
- Succeeded by: Jérôme-Adolphe Chicoyne

Personal details
- Born: July 5, 1828 Sainte-Élisabeth, near Joliette, Lower Canada
- Died: June 6, 1905 (aged 76) Wotton, Quebec
- Party: Conservative

Jacques Picard (July 5, 1828 – June 6, 1905) was a notary and political figure in Quebec. He represented Richmond-Wolfe from 1867 to 1890 and Wolfe from 1890 to 1892 as a Conservative member in the Legislative Assembly of Quebec.

He was born in Sainte-Élisabeth, Lower Canada, the son of Jacques Picard and Thérèse Lebeau. Picard was educated at the Collège de l'Assomption and the Séminaire de Joliette. He qualified as a notary in 1852 and set up practice at Wotton. Picard was mayor of Wotton from 1860 to 1862 and registrar for Wolfe County from 1862 to 1867. He was also a justice of the peace, a lieutenant-colonel in the militia and served as a member of the school board and president of the Agricultural Society.

Picard was reelected to the Quebec assembly in 1871, 1875, 1878, 1881 and 1886 in Richmond-Wolfe and then in Wolfe in 1890 after the riding was split. In 1873, Picard married Orpha Généreux. He retired from politics in 1892 and became deputy minister of Agriculture. In 1896, Picard was named crown lands agent at Sherbrooke. He died in Wotton at the age of 76.

His grandson Jacques Miquelon and his great grandson André Bourbeau also served in the Quebec assembly.
