= David Alexander Ross =

Canadian politician (1819–1897)

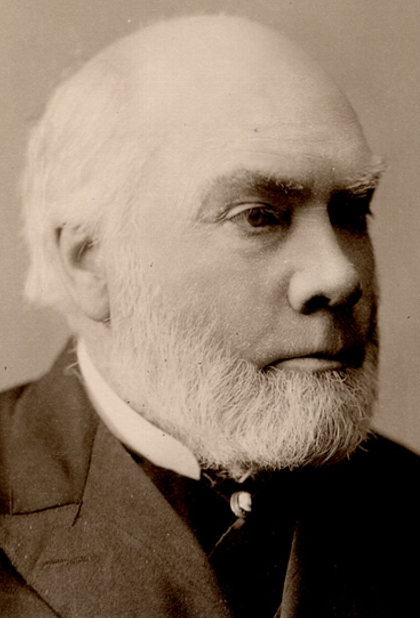

Member of the Legislative Assembly of Quebec for Québec-Comté
- In office 1878–1881
- Preceded by: Pierre Garneau
- Succeeded by: Pierre Garneau

Member of the Legislative Council of Quebec for Golfe
- In office 1887–1897
- Preceded by: Thomas Savage
- Succeeded by: Richard Turner

Personal details
- Born: March 12, 1819 Quebec City, Lower Canada
- Died: July 23, 1897 (aged 78) Quebec City, Quebec
- Party: Liberal

David Alexander Ross, QC (March 12, 1819 – July 23, 1897) was a lawyer, businessman and political figure in Quebec. He represented Québec-Comté in the Legislative Assembly of Quebec from 1878 to 1881 as a Liberal.

He was born in Quebec City, the son of John Ross. He studied with Daniel Wilkie and at the Petit Séminaire de Québec. Ross went on to article as a lawyer, was called to the bar in 1848 and set up practice at Quebec City, in partnership with Andrew Stuart. In 1841, he bought a foundry, using it to manufacture stoves and other items. In 1852, he became partner in a general store. Ross was also an agent for the Scottish Amicable Life Insurance Society and the Imperial Fire Insurance Company of London. He served as director for the Compagnie de Chemin de Fer Urbain Saint-Jean and the Quebec and Lake St. John Railway. In 1872, he married Harriet Ann Valentine, the widow of James Gibb. In 1873, he was named Queen's Counsel. He was bâtonnier for the Quebec bar in 1874 and 1886. Ross was also lieutenant-colonel in the militia and was president of the Literary and Historical Society of Quebec from 1883 to 1884. With others, he founded the newspaper L’Électeur. He served as attorney general in the Quebec cabinet from 1878 to 1879. In 1887, Ross was named to the Legislative Council of Quebec for Golfe division. He served as president of the Executive Council from 1890 to 1891. Ross died in office at Quebec City at the age of 78.
