= Levi Ruggles Church =

Canadian politician

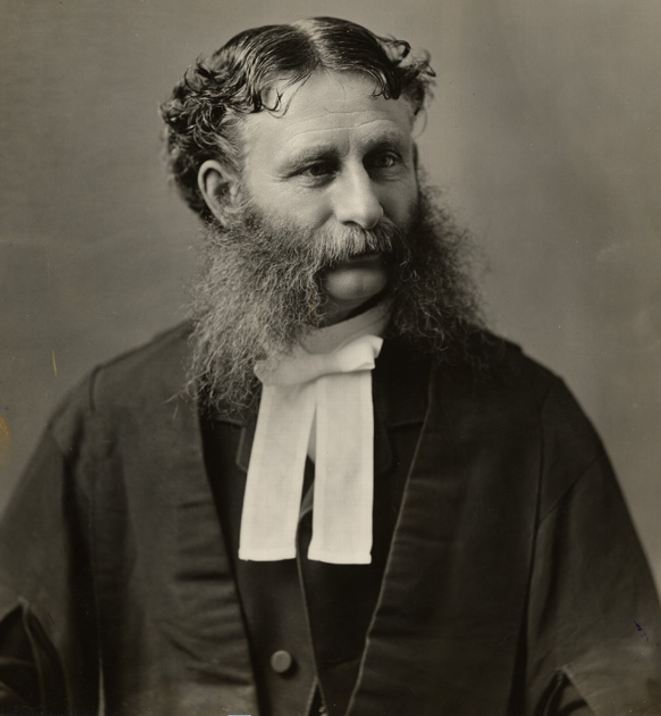

Member of the Legislative Assembly of Quebec for Ottawa
- In office 1867–1871
- Succeeded by: Ezra Butler Eddy

Member of the Legislative Assembly of Quebec for Pontiac
- In office 1874–1881
- Preceded by: John Poupore
- Succeeded by: Thomas Bryson

Personal details
- Born: May 1836 Aylmer, Lower Canada
- Died: August 30, 1892 (aged 56) Montreal, Quebec
- Party: Liberal

Levi Ruggles Church (May 1836 – August 30, 1892) was a Quebec doctor, lawyer, judge and political figure.

He was born in Aylmer in Lower Canada around May 24, 1836, the son of a doctor. He first studied medicine at Victoria College in Cobourg, the Albany Medical College in New York state and McGill College, then studied law and was called to the Lower Canada bar in 1859. He was a Conservative member of the Quebec Legislative Assembly who represented the Ottawa electoral district from 1867 to 1871 and Pontiac from 1874 to 1881. In 1868, he became crown attorney for Ottawa district and became a Queen's Counsel in 1874. He served in the provincial cabinet as attorney general from 1874 to 1876. He was a member on the first board of the Bank of Ottawa (later merged with Scotiabank), president of the Pontiac Pacific Junction Railway and a director of the College of Physicians and Surgeons of Lower Canada. He was appointed a justice in the Court of Queen's Bench in 1887 and served in that post until January 1892.

He died in Montreal in 1892.

His uncle, Basil R. Church, was a member of the Legislative Assembly of the Province of Canada.
