= Vincent-Paul Lavallée =

Canadian politician

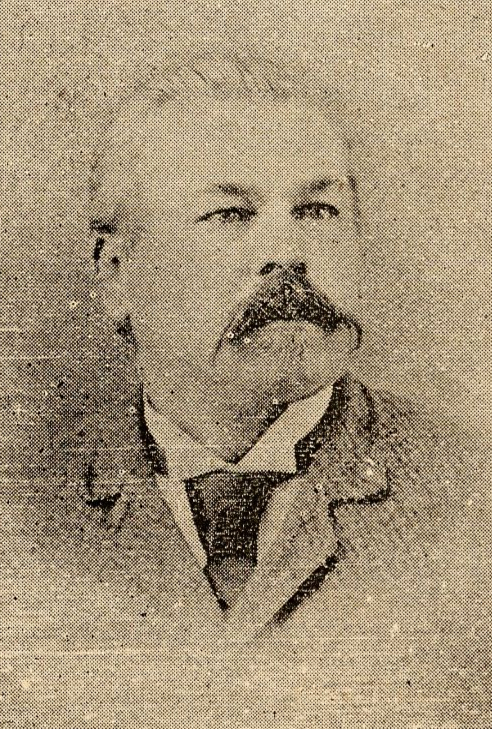

Member of the Legislative Assembly of Quebec for Joliette
- In office 1867–1885
- Succeeded by: Joseph-Norbert-Alfred McConville

Member of the Legislative Council of Quebec for De Lanaudière
- In office 1885–1888
- Preceded by: Louis-Rodrigue Masson
- Succeeded by: Louis Sylvestre

Personal details
- Born: March 27, 1839 Berthier-en-Haut (Berthierville), Lower Canada
- Died: October 15, 1931 (aged 92)
- Party: Conservative

Vincent-Paul Lavallée (March 27, 1839 – October 15, 1931) was a physician and political figure in Quebec. He represented Joliette in the Legislative Assembly of Quebec from 1867 to 1885 as a Conservative member.

He was born in Berthier-en-Haut, Lower Canada, the son of Paul Lavallée and Marie Laférière. Lavallée was educated at the Collège de Berthier and the École de médecine et de chirurgie at Montreal, qualified to practise medicine in 1860 and set up practice in Saint-Félix-de-Valois. He was also commissioner for the trial of small causes. He was married twice: to Henriette Chalut in 1861 and to Élie Crépeau in 1870. In 1885, he was named to the Legislative Council of Quebec for Lanaudière division, serving until 1888. Lavallée was an unsuccessful candidate for a seat in the House of Commons in 1896.
