= Charles-Séraphin Rodier (mayor) =

Canadian politician

The Honourable Charles-Séraphin Rodier
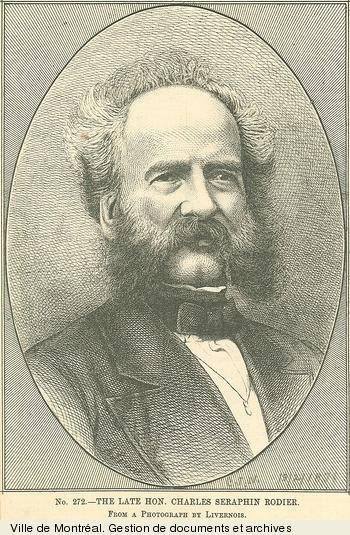

10th Mayor of Montreal
- In office 1858–1862
- Preceded by: Henry Starnes
- Succeeded by: Jean-Louis Beaudry

Member of the Legislative Council of Quebec for De Lorimier
- In office 1867–1876
- Succeeded by: Joseph-Gaspard Laviolette

Personal details
- Born: 4 October 1797 Montreal, Lower Canada, British Empire
- Died: 4 February 1876 (aged 78) Montreal, Quebec, Canada
- Profession: lawyer, merchant, philanthropist

Charles-Séraphin Rodier (4 October 1797 – 4 February 1876) was a Canadian merchant, lawyer, mayor of Montreal and legislative councillor of Quebec.

Born in Montreal, Lower Canada, the son of Jean-Baptiste Rodier and Julie-Catherine Le Jeune, Rodier was a merchant who ran a dry goods shop in Montreal. He was the first merchant in Montreal to import goods from Great Britain and France. He retired in 1836.

He decided to become a lawyer and stu

died law with Samuel Cornwallis Monk and Alexander Buchanan. He was admitted to the bar in 1841 but did not practice law. He was also a director of the Banque Jacques Cartier.

He was a member of the Montreal City Council from 1833 to 1836. In 1837, he was appointed one of the justices of the peace to administer the city. In 1840, he was appointed a member of the City Council and served until 1843. From 1840 to 1850, he was a harbour commissioner. He was elected mayor of Montreal in 1858 and was re-elected in 1859, 1860, and 1861. He was defeated in 1862 by Jean-Louis Beaudry. While he was mayor the Victoria Bridge was completed in 1859. In 1867, he was appointed Legislative Council of Quebec for the division of De Lorimier. He served until his death in 1876.

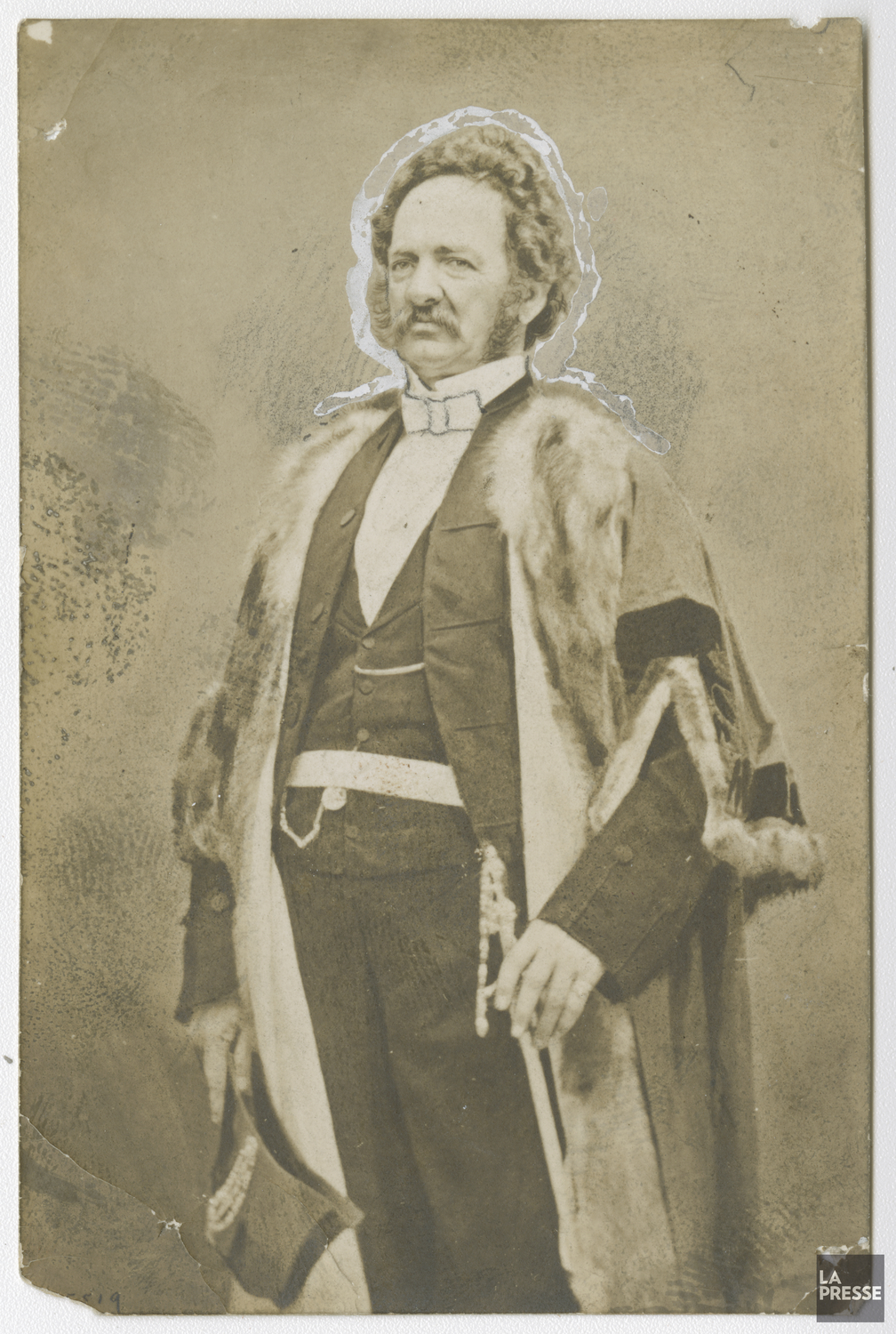
Photograph of Charles-Séraphin Rodier

He was also involved with the militia during his life. He was commissioned ensign and acting as quartermaster of the Montreal 2nd Battalion in 1821. He was promoted to Lieutenant in 1828, Captain in 1831, Major in 1847, and Lieutenant-Colonel of the 7th Montreal Battalion in 1862.

His nephew, Charles-Séraphin Rodier, was a member of the Senate of Canada.
