= Élisée Dionne =

Canadian politician (1828–1892)

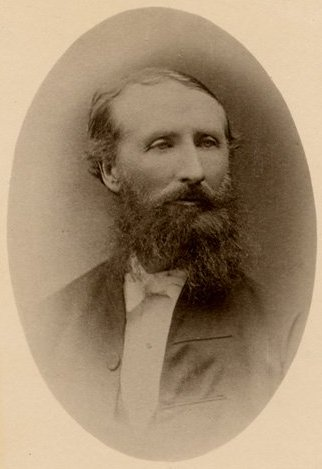

Member of the Legislative Council of Quebec for Grandville
- In office 1867–1892
- Succeeded by: Thomas-Philippe Pelletier

Personal details
- Born: August 21, 1828 Kamouraska, Lower Canada
- Died: August 22, 1892 (aged 64) Sainte-Anne-de-la-Pocatière, Quebec, Canada
- Party: Conservative
- Spouse: Clara Têtu
- Relations: Amable Dionne, father

Élisée Dionne (August 21, 1828 – August 22, 1892) was a Canadian provincial politician.

Born in Kamouraska, Lower Canada, Dionne was a member of the Legislative Council of Quebec for Grandville from 1867 to 1892.
