= John Fraser de Berry =

Canadian lawyer and politician

John Fraser de Berry M.L.C.

Member of the Legislative Council of Quebec
- In office November 2, 1867 – November 15, 1876
- Constituency: Rougemont

Personal details
- Born: November 26, 1816 Quebec City, Lower Canada
- Died: November 15, 1876 (aged 59) Saint-Marc-sur-Richelieu
- Party: Conservative Party of Quebec
- Spouse: Elizabeth Fraser
- Profession: Notary and seigneur

John Fraser de Berry (November 26, 1816 – November 15, 1876) was a Canadian lawyer and politician in Quebec.

Fraser de Berry was born at Laval, Lower Canada, in 1816. He was the son of Simon Fraser, a doctor and officer of the 42nd Regiment of Royal Highlanders (Black Watch). He was the seigneur of Contrecoeur and of Cournoyer. In 1842, he married Elizabeth Fraser, his cousin.

Admitted as a notary in 1839, Fraser de Berry became president of the commission for Small Claims. He was the Chief of the New Clan Fraser of the province of Quebec and a major of the reserve militia for Verchères. He was also the president of the Société Saint-Jean-Baptiste.

Fraser de Berry stood for election for the Montarville division of the Legislative Council of the Province of Canada in 1858, but was defeated. Upon Confederation in 1867, he was appointed to the Legislative Council of Quebec, for the division of Rougemont. He was a supporter of the Conservative party of Quebec. Originally known simply as "John Fraser", he added the ancient name of his family, "de Berry", upon his appointment to the Legislative Council.

Fraser de Berry died in office on November 15, 1876.
