= Eustache Prud'homme =

Canadian politician

Member of the Legislative Council of Quebec for Rigaud
- In office 1867–1888
- Succeeded by: Wilfrid Prévost

Personal details
- Born: June 14, 1818 Montreal, Lower Canada
- Died: November 5, 1891 (aged 73) Montreal, Quebec
- Party: Conservative

Eustache Prud'homme (June 14, 1818 – November 5, 1891) was a political figure in Canada East.

He was born in Montreal in 1818. He became a farmer and later was appointed justice of the peace. He also served as captain in the local militia. He was elected to the Legislative Council of the Province of Canada representing Rigaud division in a by-election in 1863 after the death of Robert Unwin Harwood. He served until Canadian Confederation in 1867, when he was appointed to the Legislative Council of Quebec. In 1874, he was mayor of Notre-Dame-de-Grâce. He resigned from his post as legislative councillor in 1888. He died in Montreal in 1891.
