= Thomas Wood (Quebec politician) =

Canadian politician

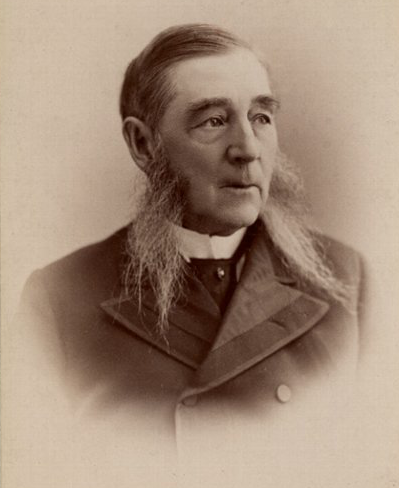

Member of the Legislative Council of Quebec for Bedford
- In office November 2, 1867 – November 13, 1898
- Succeeded by: John Charles McCorkill

Personal details
- Born: 7 March 1815 Dunham, Lower Canada
- Died: 13 November 1898 (aged 83) Dunham, Quebec
- Party: Conservative

Thomas Wood (March 7, 1815 – November 13, 1898) was a Canadian farmer and politician.

Born in Dunham, Lower Canada, Wood was appointed to the Legislative Council of Quebec for Bedford in 1867 and served until 1898.
