= Pierre Bachand =

Canadian lawyer and politician

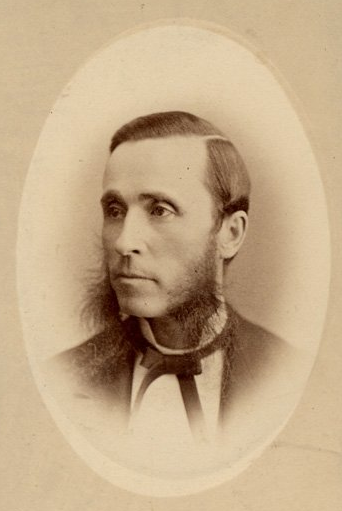

Member of the Legislative Assembly of Quebec for Saint-Hyacinthe
- In office 1867–1878
- Succeeded by: Honoré Mercier

Personal details
- Born: March 22, 1835 Verchères, Lower Canada
- Died: November 3, 1878 (aged 43) Saint-Hyacinthe, Quebec
- Party: Quebec Liberal Party

Pierre Bachand (22 March 1835 – 3 November 1878) was a lawyer and politician born in Lower Canada who studied law with Louis-Victor Sicotte in Saint-Hyacinthe. He was, at various times, deputy protonotary of the Superior Court and assistant clerk of the Circuit Court in his area.

In 1862, he went into partnership and built up a large practice throughout the area. It was a time of rapid economic growth and, through his influence, they founded a Chamber of Commerce in the Saint-Hyacinthe district.

More important to the area was the start of the Banque de Saint-Hyacinthe which Bachand helped found. He was the president until his death.

He was active in politics and ran successfully for the Liberals in the Legislative Assembly of the province of Quebec in 1867 and was unopposed in 1871 and 1875. Although he was an MLA, he was active in important matters on the federal scene. He worked with Honoré Mercier during the time of the “Pacific Scandal” and helped organize the Parti National in 1871.
