= Édouard Laberge =

Canadian politician

Member of the Legislative Assembly of Quebec for Châteauguay
- In office 1867–1883
- Succeeded by: Joseph-Émery Robidoux

Personal details
- Born: August 21, 1829 Sainte-Philomène, Lower Canada
- Died: August 22, 1883 (aged 54) Sainte-Philomène, Quebec
- Party: Liberal

Édouard Laberge (August 21, 1829 – August 22, 1883) was a medical doctor and political figure in Quebec. He represented Châteauguay in the Legislative Assembly of Quebec from 1867 to 1882 as a Liberal.

He was born in Sainte-Philomène, Lower Canada, the son of François Laberge and Appoline Brault. Laberge was educated at the collège de Montréal and McGill University. He qualified to practise as a doctor in 1856 and set up practice at Sainte-Philomène. In 1862, he married Nathalie Poulin. Laberge died in office at Sainte-Philomène at the age of 54.
