= Jean-Baptiste-Georges Proulx =

Canadian politician

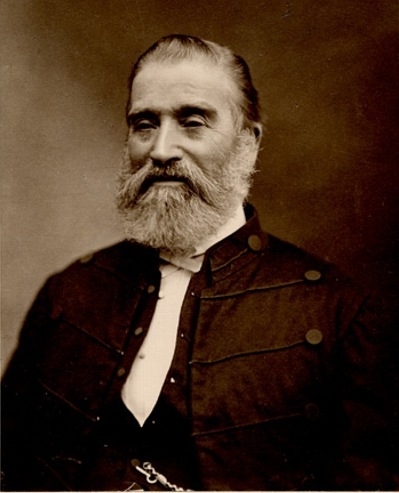

Member of the Legislative Council of the Province of Canada for de La Vallière
- In office 1860 – June 30, 1867

Member of the Legislative Council of Quebec for de La Vallière
- In office November 2, 1867 – January 27, 1884
- Succeeded by: François-Xavier-Ovide Méthot

Personal details
- Born: April 23, 1809 Nicolet, Lower Canada
- Died: January 27, 1884 (aged 74) Nicolet, Quebec
- Party: Liberal

Jean-Baptiste-Georges Proulx (April 23, 1809 – January 27, 1884) was a Canadian politician.

He was elected to the Legislative Council of the Province of Canada for the division of de La Vallière in 1860 and served until Confederation. He was appointed to the Legislative Council of Quebec for de La Vallière in 1867 and served until his death in 1884.
