= Jean-Élie Gingras =

Canadian politician

Jean-Élie Gingras M.L.C.

Member of the Legislative Council of Quebec
- In office November 2, 1867 – December 10, 1887
- Succeeded by: Guillaume Bresse
- Constituency: The Laurentides

Member of the Legislative Council of the Province of Canada
- In office September 19, 1864 – July 1, 1867
- Constituency: Stadacona

Councillor, Municipal Council of Quebec
- In office 1850–1851

Personal details
- Born: June 15, 1804 Quebec City, Lower Canada
- Died: April 13, 1891 (aged 86) Quebec City, Quebec
- Party: Conservative party of Quebec
- Spouse(s): (1) Reine Labbé (1826) (2) Caroline Lacroix (1856) (3) Marie-Rébecca Godbout (1887)
- Profession: Navigator and ship-builder

Jean-Élie Gingras (June 5, 1804 – April 13, 1891) was a navigator, ship-builder, and politician in Quebec, Canada.

Born in 1804 in Quebec City, Gingras became a navigator, and then eventually moved into ship-building. He became a member of Trinity House, Quebec.

Gingras served two terms on the municipal council of Quebec, in 1850 and 1851. In 1864 he was elected to the Legislative Council of the Province of Canada, for the division of Stadacona. He held that seat until Confederation in 1867, when he was appointed to the Legislative Council of Quebec for the division of the Laurentides, as a supporter of the Conservative Party of Quebec. He held the seat until 1887, when he resigned.

Gingras was married three times: to Reine Labbé in 1826; Caroline Lacroix in 1856; and to Marie-Rébecca Godbout in 1887. He died in 1891 at Quebec.
