= Open ballot system =

Voting method in which voters vote openly

An open ballot system is a voting method in which voters vote openly, in contrast to a secret ballot, where a voter's choices are confidential.

The open ballot system was the norm prior to Australia adopting the secret ballot in 1856. It was used in Argentina until the adoption of the secret ballot in 1912. In the late twentieth century, the open ballot was used in the Third Nigerian Republic during the 1993 Nigerian presidential election (the method was referred to as "Option A4"), an election widely considered by Nigerians as a significant symbol of democracy in Nigerian political history.

== See also ==
- 1993 Nigerian presidential election
- Moshood Abiola
- Humphrey Nwosu
