= Félix-Hyacinthe Lemaire =

Canadian politician

Member of the Legislative Council of Quebec for Mille-Isles
- In office 1867–1879
- Succeeded by: Jean-Baptiste Lefebvre de Villemure

Personal details
- Born: March 16, 1808 mission of Lac-des-Deux-Montagnes (parish of Oka), Lower Canada
- Died: December 17, 1879 (aged 71) Saint-Benoit (Deux-Montagnes County), Quebec
- Party: Conservative

Félix-Hyacinthe Lemaire (March 16, 1808 – December 17, 1879), was a political figure in Quebec.

He was born in Lac des Deux-Montagnes near Oka, the son of a carpenter and his wife. Lamaire became a notary in 1836 and was appointed agent of the Seminary of St. Sulpice. He served as a Major in the local militia and was a clerk to the circuit court. He served as mayor of Deux-Montagnes before being named to the Legislative Council of Quebec as a Conservative representing the district of Mille-Isles on November 2, 1867. He served as Speaker of the Legislative Council from 1874 to 1876. He continued as a Legislative Councillor until he died in office in 1879.

== Personal life ==
In January 1837, Lemaire married Luce Barcelo, who survived him. They had one son and one daughter.
