= 1867 Quebec general election =

Canadian provincial election

- August – September, 1867

65 seats in the 1st Legislative Assembly of Quebec 33 seats were needed for a majority (election in one constituency could not be held due to electoral riots)
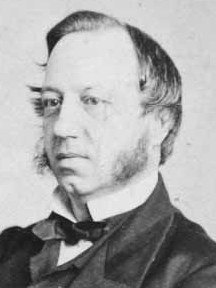

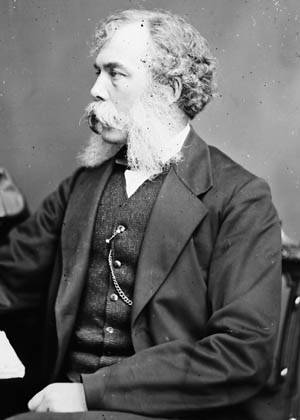
	First party	Second party
Leader	Pierre-Joseph-Olivier Chauveau	Henri-Gustave Joly de Lotbinière
Party	Conservative	Liberal
Leader since	July 15, 1867	Informal
Leader's seat	Quebec County	Lotbinière
Seats won	51	12
Popular vote	40,489	26,847
Percentage	53.48%	35.46%
- Map of the results by riding.
Premier before election
Pierre-Joseph-Olivier Chauveau
Conservative
Premier after election
Pierre-Joseph-Olivier Chauveau
Conservative

The 1867 Quebec general election was held in August and September 1867 to elect members of the First Legislature for the Province of Quebec, Canada. The Quebec Conservative Party, led by Premier Pierre-Joseph-Olivier Chauveau, defeated the Quebec Liberal Party led by Henri-Gustave Joly de Lotbinière.

== Creation of Quebec ==
The province of Quebec was created on July 1, 1867, with the proclamation of the British North America Act, 1867. That Act united the Province of Canada, Nova Scotia and New Brunswick into Canada. The Province of Canada was split into two provinces, with Canada East (formerly Lower Canada) becoming the new province of Quebec. The Legislature of Quebec was composed of the Lieutenant Governor, representing the Queen; the elected Legislative Assembly, with sixty-five seats; and the appointed Legislative Council.

Because the old Province of Canada was dissolved on July 1, 1867, the former government ceased to exist, with no formal provisions for the creation of the government of Quebec. The first prime minister of Canada, Sir John A. Macdonald, had planned to have the experienced Quebec politician, Joseph-Édouard Cauchon, appointed as the first premier. However, the proposal met strong opposition from Montreal anglophones, based on Cauchon's position on public and religious schools, which was a major political issue at the time. As a compromise candidate, the Quebec Conservatives proposed Pierre-Joseph-Olivier Chauveau, who had political experience in the Province of Canada but had been out of electoral politics for twelve years. Chauveau was generally acceptable to Quebec Conservatives, and on July 15, 1867, the Lieutenant Governor appointed him as the first premier of Quebec.

== Franchise and candidacy ==
=== Right to vote ===
The right to vote in elections to the Legislative Assembly was not universal. Only male British subjects (by birth or naturalisation), aged 21 and older, were eligible to vote, and only if they met a property qualification. For residents of cities and towns, the qualification was being the owner, tenant or occupant of real property assessed at three hundred dollars, or at an assessed yearly value of thirty dollars. For residents of townships and parishes, the requirements were either an assessment of two hundred dollars, or an assessed yearly value of twenty dollars.

Women were expressly prohibited from voting, "for any Electoral Division whatever".

Judges and many municipal and provincial officials were also barred from voting, particularly officials with duties relating to public revenue. Election officials were also barred from voting.

=== Qualification for the Legislative Assembly ===
Candidates for the Legislative Assembly had to meet a significant property qualification. A candidate had to own real property in the Province of Canada, worth at least £500 in British sterling, over and above any encumbrances on the property.

== Party structure ==
Chauveau appointed the first Cabinet, and then called the first general election for Quebec. Chauveau had been a member of the Parti Bleu when he was a member of the Legislative Assembly of the Province of Canada, and the Bleus were transitioning into the new Conservative party of Quebec. The Bleus had been well-organised under the leadership of George-Étienne Cartier, and the new Conservative party inherited that structure.

On the other hand, the liberals in the new province were not well-organised. The old Parti Rouge had opposed the confederation project, and had tended to split on that issue. Transitioning into the Liberal Party of Quebec, they did not have a strong party structure going into the election. They did not field a complete slate of candidates, and did not even have a leader, as many of their influential leaders had opted for federal politics and were now in Ottawa. Henri-Gustave Joly de Lotbinière was the informal leader of the Liberals, because of his political experience in the former Province of Canada.

== Electoral map ==
The Legislative Assembly was composed of sixty-five single-member constituencies or "ridings". The 1867 election was conducted under the pre-Confederation electoral map of the former Province of Canada. That map had set the boundaries for the sixty-five constituencies of Canada East, which became Quebec. The British North America Act, 1867 provided that the pre-Confederation electoral map would continue to be used for Quebec elections until altered by the Legislature of Quebec. The map of the sixty-five constituencies was also to be used in federal elections, until altered by Parliament.

The use of strictly single-member districts was a change from the previous election. The 8th Parliament of the Province of Canada had had four districts in Quebec where two members were elected (through Plurality block voting).

== Conduct of the election ==
The 1867 election was conducted under the election laws of the Province of Canada, which had been continued until altered by the Legislature of Quebec. The electoral process of the Province of Canada in turn had been based on the traditional British electoral process, without a secret ballot. Instead, elections were public affairs, with each voter publicly stating the name of the candidate they voted for.

The election process began with writs of election issued by the Clerk of the Crown in Chancery, one for each constituency (also called a "riding"). The writ was directed to the Returning Officer for each constituency and required the Returning Officer to hold a public nomination of candidates, and if necessary a poll, on days to be chosen by the Returning Officer.

On the nomination day, the Returning Officer held a public meeting "in the open air", at a central place in the constituency, and in a place where the public had access, such as in front of a town hall or church in the constituency. The Returning Officer addressed the assembled members of the public from a platform, called a "husting", and called for nominations. If only one person was nominated, the Returning Officer would close the nominations and declare that person elected. If more than one person was nominated, the Returning Officer would grant a poll, to be held at a future date, chosen by the Returning Officer.

On polling day, polls would be held across the constituency. The polls were in held in the open air, or in buildings close to the highways, with free access by the public. It was prohibited to hold a poll in a "tavern or place of public entertainment". The Returning Officer would appoint a Deputy Returning Officer for each polling place, normally the town clerk or other municipal official. Each Deputy Returning Officer would have a poll book. Qualified voters would appear before the Deputy Returning Officer and declare how they voted. The Deputy Returning Officer would record each voter's vote in the poll book. At the close of the polls, the Deputy Returning Officers would deliver the poll books to the Returning Officer. The Returning Officer would then total all of the polls in public, at the place where the nominations had occurred, declare which candidate was elected, and issue a proclamation declaring the election closed. The Returning Officer would then send a report of the election with the return of the writ to the Clerk of the Crown in Chancery, within fifteen days after the closing of the election.

The elections for the sixty-five provincial constituencies were not all conducted on the same day. The writs of election for each constituency gave the Returning Officer the discretion to set the original nomination day, and the subsequent date for the polling, if more than one candidate were nominated. The 1867 election was spread across the months of August and September.

One unusual event in the 1867 elections was that the constituency of Kamouraska did not return a member. On nomination day, a riot broke out and the Returning Officer had to seek refuge from the rioters. No nominations were received and no polling date was set. Kamouraska did not have a member in the Legislative Assembly until after a by-election was successfully held in 1869.

== Results ==
The result of the election was a Conservative victory. The Conservatives were maintained in office with a strong majority. The Liberals won only twelve seats.

Following the election, the Chauveau government appointed the twenty-four members of the Legislative Council. The result was a Council with a very strong Conservative majority.

Elections to the 1st Legislative Assembly of Quebec (1867)
Political party	Party leader	MLAs		Votes	
Political party	Party leader	Candidates (Note: 19 were acclaimed: 16 Conservatives, 2 Liberals and 1 Independent-Liberal)	1867	#	%
Conservative	Pierre-Joseph-Olivier Chauveau	59	51	40,479	53.47%
Liberal	Henri-Gustave Joly de Lotbinière	46	12	26,837	35.45%
Independent-Liberal		4	1	1,245	1.64%
Independent-Conservative		13	–	7,144	9.44%
Vacant		–	1	Election not held (Note: In Kamouraska (not held until 1869))	
Total		112	65	75,705	100.00%
Registered voters (contested ridings only)/ turnout				110,531	68.49%

Seats and popular vote by party
Party	Seats	Votes
Conservative	51 / 65	53.47%
Liberal	12 / 65	35.45%
Other	1 / 65	11.08%
Vacant	1 / 65	0.00%

== See also ==
- List of premiers of Quebec
- Politics of Quebec
- Timeline of Quebec history
- List of political parties in Quebec
- 1st Quebec Legislature
