= 6th Quebec Legislature =

The 6th Legislative Assembly of Quebec was the provincial legislature in Quebec, Canada that existed from October 14, 1886, to June 17, 1890. During most of the term, the Quebec Liberal Party, also known as the Parti national as that period, was the governing party. However, the Quebec Conservative Party despite losing the election tried to form a minority government with John Jones Ross and Louis-Olivier Taillon as Premiers but only managed to last a few months before the Liberals led by Honoré Mercier, the founder of the Parti National, formed a narrow majority government with 33 of the 65 seats of the Legislative Assembly of Quebec.

== Seats per political party ==
- After the 1886 elections

Affiliation	Members
Liberal/Parti national	33
Conservative	27
Conservative Independent	3
Nationalistes/Parti National	2
Total	65
Government Majority	6

== Member list ==
This was the list of members of the Legislative Assembly of Quebec that were elected in the 1886 election:

Name	Party	Riding	First elected / previously elected	No. of terms
William Owens	Conservative	Argenteuil	1881	2nd term
Joseph Pilon	Liberal	Bagot	1886	1st term
Jean Blanchet	Conservative	Beauce	1881	2nd term
Élie-Hercule Bisson	Liberal	Beauharnois	1873, 1886	3rd term*
Édouard Faucher de Saint-Maurice	Conservative	Bellechasse	1881	2nd term
Louis Sylvestre	Liberal	Berthier	1871, 1886	3rd term*
Omer Dostaler (1890)	Liberal	Berthier	1890	1st term
Henri-Josué Martin	Conservative	Bonaventure	1882	2nd term
William Warren Lynch	Conservative	Brome	1871	5th term
Rufus Nelson England (1889)	Conservative	Brome	1889	1st term
Antoine Rocheleau	Liberal	Chambly	1886	1st term
Ferdinand Trudel	Parti national	Champlain	1886	1st term
Joseph Morin	Liberal	Charlevoix	1886	1st term
Joseph-Émery Robidoux	Liberal	Châteauguay	1884	2nd term
Élie Saint-Hilaire	Conservative Independent	Chicoutimi et Saguenay	1881	2nd term
Séverin Dumais (1888)	Parti national	Chicoutimi et Saguenay	1888	1st term
John McIntosh	Conservative	Compton	1886	1st term
Benjamin Beauchamp	Conservative Independent	Deux-Montagnes	1882	2nd term
Louis-Napoléon Larochelle	Conservative	Dorchester	1871, 1886	3rd term*
Louis-Philippe Pelletier (1888)	Nationalist Conservative	Dorchester	1888	1st term
Joseph-Éna Girouard	Liberal	Drummond et Arthabaska	1886	2nd term
Edmund James Flynn	Conservative (Note: First Elected as a Liberal)	Gaspé	1878	3rd term
Joseph-Octave Villeneuve	Conservative	Hochelaga	1886	1st term
Charles Champagne (1888)	Liberal	Hochelaga	1888	1st term
Alexander Cameron	Liberal	Huntingdon	1874	5th term
Alexis-Louis Demers	Liberal	Iberville	1881	2nd term
Georges Duhamel (1886)	Parti national	Iberville	1886	1st term
François-Gilbert Miville Dechêne	Liberal	Islet	1886	1st term
Arthur Boyer	Liberal	Jacques Cartier	1884	2nd term
Louis Basinet	Liberal	Joliette	1886	1st term
Charles-Antoine-Ernest Gagnon	Liberal	Kamouraska	1878	3rd term
Léon-Benoît-Alfred Charlebois	Conservative	Laprairie	1875	4th term
Ludger Forest	Liberal	L'Assomption	1886	1st term
Pierre-Évariste Leblanc	Conservative	Laval	1882, 1884	3nd term*
François-Xavier Lemieux	Liberal	Lévis	1883	2nd term
Édouard-Hippolyte Laliberté	Liberal	Lotbinière	1886	2nd term
Édouard Caron	Conservative	Maskinongé	1878	3rd term
Joseph-Hormisdas Legris (1888)	Parti national	Maskinongé	1888	1st term
Andrew Stuart Johnson	Conservative	Mégantic	1886	1st term
William Rhodes (1888)	Liberal	Mégantic	1888	1st term
Elijah Edmund Spencer	Conservative	Missisquoi	1881	2nd term
Jean-Baptiste-Trefflé Richard	Conservative	Montcalm	1881	2nd term
Louis-Olivier Taillon (1886)	Conservative	Montcalm	1875, (Note: Montréal Est) 1886	4th term*
Nazaire Bernatchez	Liberal	Montmagny	1883	2nd term
Louis-Georges Desjardins	Conservative	Montmorency	1881	2nd term
James McShane	Liberal	Montréal Centre	1878	3rd term
Laurent-Olivier David	Liberal	Montréal Est	1886	1st term
John Smythe Hall	Conservative	Montreal Ouest	1886	1st term
Eugène Lafontaine	Liberal	Napierville	1886	1st term
Louis-Trefflé Dorais	Conservative Independent	Nicolet	1883	2nd term
Honoré Brunelle Tourigny (1888)	Conservative	Nicolet	1888	1st term
Narcisse-Édouard Cormier	Conservative	Ottawa (Outaouais)	1886	1st term
Alfred Rochon (1887)	Liberal	Ottawa (Outaouais)	1887	1st term
William Joseph Poupore	Conservative	Pontiac	1882	2nd term
Jules Tessier	Liberal	Portneuf	1886	1st term
Thomas Chase Casgrain	Conservative	Québec-Comté	1886	1st term
Rémi-Ferdinand Rinfret dit Malouin	Liberal	Québec-Centre	1874	5th term
Joseph Shehyn	Liberal	Québec-Est	1875	4th term
Owen Murphy	Liberal	Québec-Ouest	1886	1st term
Louis-Pierre-Paul Cardin	Liberal	Richelieu	1886	1st term
Jacques Picard	Conservative	Richmond et Wolfe	1867	6th term
Édouard-Onésiphore Martin	Liberal	Rimouski	1886	1st term
Auguste Tessier (1889)	Liberal	Rimouski	1889	1st term
Edmond Lareau	Liberal	Rouville	1886	1st term
Honoré Mercier	Liberal	St. Hyacinthe	1879	3rd term
Félix-Gabriel Marchand	Liberal	St. Jean	1867	6th term
Nérée Duplessis	Conservative	St. Maurice	1886	1st term
Thomas Brassard	Liberal	Shefford	1886	1st term
Tancrède Boucher de Grosbois (1888)	Liberal	Shefford	1888	1st term
Joseph Gibb Robertson	Conservative	Sherbrooke	1867	6th term
Avila-Gonzague Bourbonnais	Parti national	Soulanges	1886	1st term
Ozro Baldwin	Conservative	Stanstead	1886	1st term
Georges-Honoré Deschênes	Conservative	Témiscouata	1875	4th term
Guillaume-Alphonse Nantel	Conservative	Terrebonne	1882	2nd term
Henri-René-Arthur Turcotte	Liberal	Trois-Rivières	1876, 1886	4th term*
Alfred Lapointe	Conservative	Vaudreuil	1884	2nd term
Albert-Alexandre Lussier	Liberal	Verchères	1886	1st term
Victor Gladu	Liberal	Yamaska	1886	1st term

== Other elected MLAs ==
Other MLAs were elected during by-elections or in another district between the two general elections

- Georges Duhamel, Parti national, Iberville, December 11, 1886
- Louis-Olivier Taillon, Quebec Conservative Party, Montcalm, December 11, 1886
- Odilon Goyette, Parti national, St. Hyacinthe, July 30, 1887,
- Alfred Rochon, Quebec Liberal Party, Ottawa (Outaouais), September 14, 1887
- Louis-Phillippe Pelletier, Nationalist Conservative, Dorchester, December 20, 1888
- Charles Champagne, Quebec Liberal Party, Hochelaga, April 28, 1888
- Joseph-Hormidas Legris, Parti national, Maskinongé, April 28, 1888
- Tancrède Boucher de Grosbois, Quebec Liberal Party, Shefford, May 18, 1888
- Séverin Dumais, Parti national, Chicoutimi et Saguenay, June 18, 1888
- Honoré Brunelle Tourigny, Quebec Conservative Party, Nicolet, July 17, 1888
- William Rhodes, Quebec Liberal Party, Mégantic, December 27, 1888
- Rufus Nelson England, Quebec Conservative Party, Brome, November 28, 1889
- Auguste Tessier, Quebec Liberal Party, Rimouski, December 4, 1889,
- Omer Dostaler, Quebec Liberal Party, Berthier, Janvier 15, 1890

== New provincial ridings ==
The electoral map was reformed in 1890 just a few months prior to the elections later that year.

- Drummond et Arthabaska was split into two ridings: Drummond and Arthabaska
- Lac-Saint-Jean was created from parts of Chicoutimi et Saguenay.
- Matane was created from parts of Rimouski.
- Montréal-Est was split into three districts called Montréal division no. 1, Montréal division no. 2 and Montréal division no. 3
- Montréal-Ouest was split into two districts called Montréal division no. 4 and Montréal division no. 5.
- Montréal-Centre was renamed Montréal division no. 6.
- Richmond et Wolfe was split into two new riding: Richmond and Wolfe
- Saint-Sauveur was created from parts of Québec-Est.

== Cabinet Ministers ==
=== Ross Cabinet (1886-1887) ===
- Prime Minister and Executive Council President: John Jones Ross
- Agriculture and public works: John Jones Ross
- Crown Lands: William Warren Lynch
- Attorney General: Louis-Olivier Taillon
- Secretary and Registry: Jean Blanchet
- Treasurer: Joseph Gibb Robertson
- Solicitor General: Edmund James Flynn

=== Taillon Cabinet (1887) ===
- Prime Minister and Executive Council President: Louis-Olivier Taillon
- Agriculture and public works: Henry Starnes
- Crown Lands: William Warren Lynch
- Attorney General: Louis-Olivier Taillon
- Secretary and Registry: Jean Blanchet
- Treasurer: Joseph Gibb Robertson
- Solicitor General: Edmund James Flynn

=== Mercier Cabinet (1887-1890) ===
- Prime Minister and Executive Council President: Honoré Mercier
- Agriculture and public works: James McShane (1887-1888)
  - Agriculture and Colonization: Honoré Mercier (1888), William Rhodes (1888-1890)
  - Public Works: Pierre Garneau (1888-1890)
- Crown Lands: Pierre Garneau (1887-1888), Georges Duhamel (1888-1890)
- Attorney General: Honoré Mercier (1887-1888), Arthur Turcotte (1888-1890)
- Secretary and Registry: Charles-Antoine-Ernest Gagnon (1887-1890), Joseph-Émery Robidoux (1890)
- Treasurer: Joseph Shehyn
- Solicitor General: Georges Duhamel (1887-1888)
- Members without portfolios: David Alexander Ross, Arthur Turcotte (1887-1888), Arthur Boyer (1890)

== See also ==
- 1886 election results
- List of Historical Cabinet Ministers
