= Anne-Marie Huguenin =

Canadian writer, journalist, and editor (1875–1943)

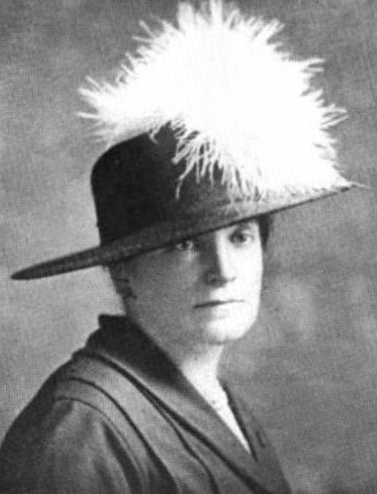
- Huguenin in 1924
- Born: Anne-Marie Gleason; 5 October 1875; Rimouski, Québec, Canada
- Died: 21 October 1943 (aged 68); Montréal, Quebec, Canada
- Spouse: Wilfrid-Arthur Huguenin (m. 1904; died 1924)
- Children: Madeleine
- Relatives: Joseph Garon (maternal grandfather)
- Writing career
- Pen name: Madeleine
- Language: French
- Years active: 1897–1943

Anne-Marie Huguenin (née Gleason; 5 October 1875 – 21 October 1943), also known by her pen name Madeleine, was a Canadian writer, journalist and editor. One of the first female journalists in Canada, Huguenin wrote more than 3000 columns and articles between 1897 and 1943. Editing La Patrie for over 19 years, Huguenin later founded La Revue moderne.

== Personal life and education ==
Huguenin was born 5 October 1875 in Rimouski, Québec to John Gleason, an Irish Canadian lawyer, and Eugénie Garon. Through her mother, Huguenin was the granddaughter of the Québécois notary and political figure Joseph Garon. Beginning at age five, Huguenin attended the Sœurs de la Charité (Sisters of Charity) convent in La Malbaie. She later studied at the convent in Rimouski from 1883 to 1890, though she never obtained her diploma because her father withdrew her from school before the end of her schooling.

In 1904, Huguenin married Wilfrid-Arthur Huguenin, a wealthy doctor who supported her financially and psychologically. His support allowed La Revue moderne to operate independently. The couple had a daughter (Madeleine) in 1905. Her husband died in 1924 at the age of 56, and her daughter died five years later. The tragedies greatly slowed her career.

== Career ==
Madeleine Huguenin became known as a journalist, writer, playwright. By the end of her career, she had contributed to 18 different periodicals, published three textbooks, two plays and a novel.

=== Journalism ===
Huguenin began her journalistic career for Le Courrier de Rimouski. Although copies of the periodical in question no longer exist, it is believed she began writing for this periodical before the age of 20. She then continued her journalistic career within the newspaper Le Monde illustré from May 1897, where she wrote under the pseudonym "Myrto". Her participation in this periodical lasted 4 years. Shortly after, she moved to Ottawa, where she began writing for Le Temps.

In 1901, Joseph-Israel Tarte offered Huguenin a position writing the women's section of La Patrie. When she accepted the position, she replaced Robertine Barry who resigned to found her own periodical. From this moment, Huguenin began to sign under the pseudonym "Madeleine," which she used for over 19 years. This segment made it possible to reach a broader audience of women and introduced several types of content such as poetry, recipes, biographies, fashion, and more. Aurélien Her posts also concerned the daily life of Montreal women and how they could improve their conditions as women. Aurélien Further, she suggested to women to educate themselves with different readings, to show temperance, to support charitable works, etc.

In 1903, along with colleagues, Huguenin formed the Association des journalistes Canadiens-français to improve working conditions for French-Canadian journalists. The association disestablished in 1907.

In 1919, Huguenin left the daily La Patrie and founded La Revue moderne, which became Châtelaine in 1960 after having been purchased by Maclean-Hunter. When founding this new periodical, she aimed to give a platform to all intellectual tendencies, saying La Revue Moderne is not connected to any party, devoted to any policy, nor subsidized by anyone's money and therefore, can allow its writers to express their ideas sincerely, even if it means attracting replies that will put life and thought into our pages: 'From the discussion springs light', let us not forget it not. However, the journal quickly adopted a position in favor of national unity and repeatedly attacked nationalism and its representatives.

Addressing a predominantly female readership, La Revue moderne also aimed to educate women by developing their appreciation of the arts and literature. Aimed particularly at wealthy women, the periodical encouraged women to consume luxury goods. However, it also encouraged women to empower themselves by demonstrating their ability to make their own choices in order to improve their living conditions and their social relations, especially with men.

Huguenin served as the sole editor of La Revue moderne for five years, after which she had co-editors. During her time with the magazine, she also directed its production and wrote columns. As with La Patrie, Huguenin used her position as a journalist to encourage women to improve their daily lives. She particularly defended access to education for young girls while defending the instruction of domestic economy. She also took a position on the various political issues through her editorials, which were signed under her pseudonym.

In 1928, she founded "La Vie canadienne, which she merged with La Revue moderne in October 1929."

In 1934, she became the literary editor for Action conservatrice.

=== Theatre ===
Apart from her journalistic career, Huguenin was also a playwright. She wrote two plays, the first was entitled L'Adieu du poète (The Poet's Farewell), which was first performed in 1902. The second play was called En pleine gloire! (In Full Glory!). It had been designed for a French dignitary visiting Quebec in 1919.

=== Novel ===
Huguenin published Anne Mérival, her only full-length novel, as a serial work in La Revue moderne between October and December 1927. The novel was about a journalist in a major daily newspaper who seeks recognition from her husband for his literary talent.

=== Collections of texts ===
Throughout her career, from 1897 to 1943, Huguenin produced more than three thousand chronicles, notes, stories, letters and articles of various styles. During her career, she therefore published three collections of chronicles: Premier Péché (1902), Le Long du chemin (1912), and Le Meilleur de soi (1924).

== Positions ==
=== Feminism ===
Despite her positions in favor of improving the conditions of women, Huguenin refused the feminist label. She wanted to avoid being associated with the new movement that provoked the anger of the clergy and the majority ideology. She therefore tried to stay away from this ideological debate, while encouraging women to free themselves on a daily basis.

She also did not speak publicly about women's right to vote. Trying to reach out to both liberal feminists and maternalist feminists, asking them to join in a single cause for the advancement of the women's movement, she kept her personal opinion on the right to vote to avoid alienating one of the two camps. Though she was in favour of women voting on principle, she asserted that the lack of political culture of women would lead to their exploitation during the elections.

=== French language ===
Huguenin held a great respect for the French language throughout her career. She spoke to defend the French language, notably at a conference entitled "Le Foyer, gardien de la langue française". During the conference, she defended, among other things, the importance of mothers speaking the language with children.

== Charities and organizations ==
Apart from her work as a journalist and periodical director, Huguenin was involved in several charities. She defended several causes including the protection of seniors, women, and the disadvantaged. She was involved in two causes in particular: the Canadian Women's Press Club and the Fédération nationale Saint-Jean-Baptiste.

=== Canadian Women's Press Club ===
In 1904, Huguenin was among 16 Canadian women journalists (including Kathleen "Kit" Coleman, Kate Simpson Hayes, Robertine Barry, and Léonise Valois) selected to report on the World's Fair in St. Louis, Missouri. The women travelled together, bonded, and determined it would be important to establish the bases of a national collaboration between the women journalists of Canada in order to establish their credibility and improve their working conditions. This resulted in the establishment of the Canadian Women's Press Club, whose mission is to "maintain and improve the status of journalism as a profession for women." Through the 1920s, the organization had a total of 400 members, which grew to 700 in the 1970s.

=== La Bonne Parole ===
In 1913, Huguenin founded La Bonne Parole, a publication of the Fédération nationale Saint-Jean-Baptiste, an organization whose mission was to connect French Canadian Catholic women to strengthen them in the family and society through union. La Bonne parole published various magazines in which the women members of the Fédération nationale Saint-Jean-Baptiste discussed women's issues and their vision of the world.

Huguenin directed La Bonne Parole from 1913 to 1919. Through this role, she encouraged women to take responsibility and make their war effort during World War I. She left the organization in 1919 to concentrate on La Revue moderne.

La Bonne Parole published in Montréal until 1958.

== Awards ==
During her career, Huguenin won several awards for her journalistic contribution as well as for her charitable works. The French government awarded her the Palmes académiques in 1910 and the Palmes de l'Instruction publique in 1916. For her great involvement during the First World War, France granted her the Silver Medal of French Recognition in 1920 and Belgium gave her the Gold Medal of Belgian Recognition in 1921.
