= Louis-Napoléon Asselin =

Canadian politician

Member of the Legislative Assembly of Quebec for Rimouski
- In office 1881–1886
- Preceded by: Joseph Parent
- Succeeded by: Édouard-Onésiphore Martin

Personal details
- Born: July 22, 1850 Saint-François on the Île d'Orléans, Canada East
- Died: July 22, 1921 (aged 71) Biddeford, Maine
- Party: Conservative

Louis-Napoléon Asselin (July 22, 1850 – July 22, 1921) was a lawyer and political figure in Quebec, Canada. He represented Rimouski in the Legislative Assembly of Quebec from 1881 to 1886 as a Conservative.

He was born in Saint-François on the Île d'Orléans, Canada East, the son of Louis Asselin and Marie Laperrière, and was educated at the Séminaire de Québec and the Université Laval. Asselin was called to the Quebec bar in 1870 and set up practice in Rimouski. In 1876, he married Théotiste-Malvina-Louise Derome. He served as crown prosecutor for Rimouski district in 1880 and 1881. Asselin ran unsuccessfully for a seat in the Quebec assembly in 1880, losing to Joseph Parent, and then defeated Parent in the 1881 general election. He was defeated by Édouard-Onésiphore Martin when he ran for reelection in 1886, also losing a by-election in 1889 and then elections for the Quebec assembly in Matane in 1890 and in Rimouski in 1908. Asselin was mayor of Rimouski from 1885 to 1887, was school commissioner from 1895 to 1898 and from 1903 to 1915 and was sheriff for Rimouski from 1895 to 1898. He was a founder and director of the newspaper Progrès du Golfe. Asselin was president of the Rimouski Saint-Jean-Baptiste Society. In 1914, he was named a repatriation officer at Biddeford, Maine for the Canadian government, charged with encouraging former Quebec residents who had emigrated to the United States to return to Quebec. He died there seven years later at the age of 71.
