= Ezra Butler Eddy =

Canadian politician

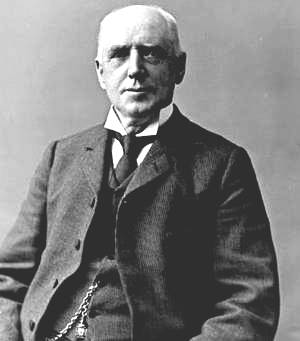

Member of the Legislative Assembly of Quebec for Ottawa
- In office 1871–1875
- Preceded by: Levi Ruggles Church
- Succeeded by: Louis Duhamel

Personal details
- Born: August 22, 1827 Near Bristol, Vermont, United States
- Died: February 10, 1906 (aged 78) Standish Hall, Hull, Quebec, Canada
- Party: Conservative
- Children: 3 (only one of whom survived infancy)

Ezra B. Eddy's signature, 10/1854

Ezra Butler Eddy (August 22, 1827 – February 10, 1906) was a Canadian businessman and political figure. Born in Vermont, Eddy moved to Canada, where he founded the E. B. Eddy Company, which produced matches and related wood products, later diversifying into pulp and paper and expanding to become a major manufacturer. Eddy later became a politician, serving as mayor of Hull, Quebec and as a Quebec legislator.

== Early life ==
Ezra Butler Eddy was born near Bristol, Vermont on August 22, 1827, the son of Samuel Eddy and Clarissa Eastman. His father was of Scottish ancestry. With respect to his religious connections, he was brought up a Baptist. He was raised on a farm until he was about ten, and during some of that time he attended the district school. His father then moved from the family farm into the village of Bristol and began hotel-keeping, with young Eddy as his assistant. While here, Ezra again had the privilege of attending school for four winters.

Not caring for this way of life, and having a strong inclination for general business, Ezra left home at the age of fifteen and went to New York City. He procured a situation in a mercantile at three dollars a week, and on that sum had to provide his own room and board. He was, however, promoted within three months, receiving ten dollars per week while also soon being entrusted with the firm's banking business. After a year, not enjoying city life, Eddy returned to Vermont, and went into business for himself, purchasing butter, cheese, and similar products, selling these in the Boston and New York markets.

== Manufacturing ==
Eddy first began manufacturing wooden matches by hand in Burlington, Vermont in 1851. In 1854, he brought his business to Hull, Canada East (now Gatineau, Quebec) when he was only twenty-four, and began producing matches using discarded wood from the nearby sawmills. With the help of his first wife, Eddy produced matches by hand at his home in Hull. His business grew rapidly, becoming one of the largest match factories in the world. In 1856, he added the manufacture of wooden ware, such as pails, tubs, washboards, clothes-pins, etc., to his business.

In 1858, he commenced lumbering in a small way; but all these branches increased in volume from year to year, until 1868, when the business had reached a magnitude of one million dollars per annum. In 1882, his entire premises were consumed by fire, resulting in a loss of $250,000, over and above insurance. With characteristic enterprise and courage, in the space of twelve months new premises were erected, and he was able to turn out nearly the same quantity of goods, as during former years. By 1886, he had reorganized and established the E. B. Eddy Company. He set up a factory, acquired timber rights and built his sawmill. At the same time, he expanded into the pulp and paper business.

== Mayor ==
For thirteen years, at different times he occupied the position of Mayor of Hull. He represented Ottawa electoral district in the Legislative Assembly of Quebec from 1871 to 1875. He was a member of the municipal council for Hull from 1878 to 1888 and mayor from 1881 to 1885, from 1887 to 1888 and from 1891 to 1892. He tabled the bill creating the City of Hull in 1875. Besides running his factories, he was an administrator of the Canada Central Railway Company.

== 1900 fire ==
After the great fire on April 26, 1900, Eddy was able to re-establish operation in less than a year in spite of the fact that he had suffered an estimated loss of 3 million dollars in the fire. Despite the fires that repeatedly ravaged his factories and his house, Eddy persevered. He was an astute and canny industrialist whose success during this era of industrial capitalist expansion was due, in part, to his involvement in politics.

== Personal life ==
He was highly esteemed, not only in Hull but throughout Canada. He founded the Eddy Lodge, A. F. & A. M. of the Grand Lodge of Quebec, and was also a Knight Templar. He was married twice, first in Bristol, Vermont, on December 29, 1884, to Zaida Diana Arnold. They had three children, two sons and one daughter. The boys, Rollin and Samuel, died in infancy, but his daughter, Ella Clarissa, survived him. Zaida died in 1893. He wed his second wife, Jennie Grahl Shirreff, in Halifax on June 27, 1894. Upon his death, she became his principal heir.

== Death ==
He died at Standish Hall, Hull, Quebec, on February 10, 1906, and his body was taken to Bristol, Vermont where he was buried at the Bristol Board Cemetery. Eddy's company was one of the major employers in the region for over a hundred years. The pulp and paper business is now a division of Domtar and Eddy Match Company is now a brand name of Atlas Matches of Euless, Texas.

In 1976, a plaque was dedicated to Ezra Butler Eddy in Hull, Quebec.
