= Nérée =

Nérée is a given name. Notable people with the name include:

- Carel de Nerée tot Babberich (1880–1909), Dutch symbolist artist
- Nérée Arsenault (1911–1982), Canadian politician and forest engineer
- Nérée Beauchemin (1850–1931), French Canadian poet and physician
- Nérée Boubée (1806–1862), naturalist, entomologist, geologist, author and a professor at the University of Paris
- Nérée Le Noblet Duplessis (1855–1926), politician in the province of Quebec, Canada
- Nérée Tétreau (1842–1911), notary, land owner and political figure in Quebec
- Pierre-Nérée Dorion (1816–1874), Quebec land surveyor and political figure

== See also ==
- Saint-Nérée-de-Bellechasse, Quebec, a village in the Bellechasse Regional County Municipality of Quebec
