= Solange Charest =

Canadian politician

MNA for Rimouski
- In office September 12, 1994 – February 21, 2007
- Preceded by: Michel Tremblay
- Succeeded by: Irvin Pelletier

Personal details
- Born: August 3, 1950 (age 75) Amqui, Quebec
- Party: Parti Québécois

Solange Charest (born August 3, 1950 in Amqui, Quebec) is a Quebec politician. She was a Member of the National Assembly of Quebec for the riding of Rimouski from 1994 to 2007, representing the Parti Québécois.
