= Alexandre Chauveau =

Canadian politician (1847–1916)

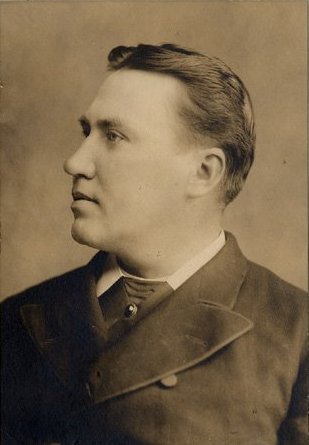

Member of the Legislative Assembly of Quebec for Rimouski
- In office 1872–1880
- Preceded by: Louis Honoré Gosselin
- Succeeded by: Joseph Parent

Personal details
- Born: February 23, 1847 Quebec City, Canada East
- Died: March 7, 1916 (aged 69) New York City, New York
- Relations: Pierre-Joseph-Olivier Chauveau, father

Alexandre Chauveau (French pronunciation: [alɛksɑ̃dʁ ʃovo]; February 23, 1847 – March 7, 1916) was a lawyer, judge, educator and political figure in Quebec. He represented Rimouski in the Legislative Assembly of Quebec from 1872 to 1880 as both a Conservative member and a Liberal cabinet minister.

He was born in Quebec City, the son of Pierre-Joseph-Olivier Chauveau and Marie-Louise-Flore Massé. Chauveau was educated at the Collège Sainte-Marie at Montreal, the Université Laval and McGill University. He articled in law with S. Lelièvre at Quebec City and George-Étienne Cartier in Montreal, was called to the Quebec bar in 1868 and set up practice in Quebec City with Richard Alleyn. In 1871, he married Marie-Anne-Adèle, the daughter of Ulric-Joseph Tessier. In 1878, Chauveau was named Queen's Counsel.

He was first elected to the Quebec assembly in an 1872 by-election held after Louis Honoré Gosselin resigned his seat. Chauveau was reelected in 1875 as an independent conservative. In 1878, he was elected as a Liberal. He served in the Quebec cabinet as Solicitor General from 1878 to 1879 and then as secretary and registrar. He rejoined the Conservative caucus in 1879 with three other members, leading to the defeat of the Liberal government. He resigned his seat in the Quebec assembly in 1880 after he was named to the Court of Sessions of the Peace. Chauveau was police magistrate for Quebec district from 1882 to 1890.

Chauveau was professor of criminal law at the Université Laval from 1894 to 1916. He also served as a director, vice-president and president for the Banque Nationale at Quebec City and president of the Quebec Saint-Jean-Baptiste Society.

He died in New York City at the age of 69 while debarking from a boat returning from Havana and was buried in Sainte-Foy.
