= Serge Geoffrion =

Canadian politician and journalist

Member of the National Assembly of Quebec for La Prairie
- In office November 30, 1998 – April 14, 2003
- Preceded by: Monique Simard
- Succeeded by: Jean Dubuc

Personal details
- Born: May 2, 1955 (age 70) Montreal, Quebec
- Party: Parti Québécois
- Profession: Journalist

Serge Geoffrion (born May 2, 1955) is a Quebec politician and journalist. He served as the member for La Prairie in the Quebec National Assembly as a member of the Parti Québécois from 1998 until 2003.

== Biography ==
Geoffrion attended the Université Laval, where he obtained a bachelor's degree in political science and minored in journalism. He worked at the Centre de formation des journalistes in Paris and then at the newspaper Le Quotidien de Paris in 1980. He returned to Canada as a journalist for Le Peuple de Lévis and worked as an assistant lecturer in the Department of Journalism at Université Laval in 1983. Geoffrion then became editor of Les Nouvelles de Saint-Laurent in 1986 and 1987, and subsequently editor-in-chief of the newspaper L'Événement de Saint-Constant from 1988 until 1989.

== Political career ==
Geoffrion worked as Director of Communications for the Parti Québécois de Lévis in 1985. He was responsible for communications for the no committee in La Prairie during the 1992 referendum on the Charlottetown Accord and for the yes committee in La Prairie for the 1995 Quebec Referendum. He then worked as Director of Communications for the Parti Quebecois in La Prairie for two elections.

During this time Geoffrion was an aide to Denis Lazure and then his successor Monique Simard. Simard did not run for re-election in 1998. Geoffrion ran as her successor 1998, and won easily. He sought re-election in 2003 and lost his seat to Liberal Jean Dubuc by 937 votes.

Since his departure from office he has worked as an aide to Maka Kotto as both a Member of Parliament and a Member of the National Assembly.
