= Alain Marcoux =

Canadian politician

Alain Marcoux (born August 10, 1945) is a Canadian administrator and former politician. Marcoux was a Parti Québécois member of the National Assembly of Quebec from 1976 to 1985 and was a cabinet minister in the governments of René Lévesque and Pierre-Marc Johnson. Marcoux is currently the director-general of Quebec City.

== Early life and career ==
Marcoux was born in Saint-Norbert, Quebec and was educated at the Université de Montréal and the Université Laval, earning a degree in sociology. He later took an advanced course in administration at the École nationale d'administration publique. Marcoux taught economics and social science at the Cégep de Rimouski from 1969 to 1973 and served as director of the same institution from 1973 to 1977.

He was a Parti Québécois activist before his election, leading the party's Rimouski association from 1971 to 1974 and serving on its national executive from 1974 to 1977.

== Legislator and cabinet minister ==
Marcoux was elected to the Quebec legislature in the 1976 provincial election, defeating one-term Liberal incumbent Claude St-Hilaire in the Rimouski division. The Parti Québécois won a historic majority government in this election and Marcoux served for the next five years as a government backbencher. From 1979 to 1981, he was parliamentary assistant to the minister of social affairs.

He was re-elected in the 1981 provincial election and was appointed to René Lévesque's cabinet as the minister of public works and supply on April 30, 1981. On September 9, 1982, he was also named as revenue minister.

Revenue minister

Marcoux announced in October 1982 that Quebec would not move forward with an earlier plan to introduce casinos to the province. In making this decision, he issued a brief statement saying that the government was concerned about "the consequences on the social climate and the quality of life of Quebeckers." He later announced that Lévesque government would tax the tips earned by waiters and waitresses via a weekly paycheque reduction; this proved to be an unpopular measure and was never enacted.

Public Works minister

Marcoux introduced a bill in 1983 to abolish his own department of public works and replace it with a publicly owned corporation. His national assembly biography indicates that he ceased to be the public works minister on October 1, 1984, although newspaper reports from 1985 suggest that he still held the position in a later period.

Municipal Affairs minister

René Lévesque shuffled his cabinet on March 5, 1984, shifting Marcoux from revenue to the ministry of municipal affairs. Shortly after his appointment, Marcoux concluded what had previously been a contentious dispute with the government of Canada over job-creation grants to municipalities. The agreement required that Quebec municipalities go through the provincial municipal affairs department when seeking federal grants.

Marcoux introduced legislation in early 1985 to consolidate and reform Quebec's municipal election laws. One of his proposals was to require that councillors running in mayoral by-elections resign their council seats. Later in the same year, Marcoux announced seven hundred thousand dollars in funding to help move failing day-care centres into public buildings. In May 1985, he and transport minister Guy Tardif introduced legislation to allow Montreal and South Shore residents to have public meetings on the state of municipal transit.

Marcoux also introduced legislation to restrict the amount of money that municipal political parties could raise from anonymous sources. The bill died on the order paper when the 1985 election was called.

Parti Québécois divisions

The Parti Québécois went through an internal crisis in late 1984 over the nature of its support for Quebec sovereignty. Leading party figures including René Lévesque sought to moderate the party's approach, while more hardline members preferred to make a new declaration of support for Quebec independence. Marcoux sided with the moderates and argued that the party should not fight the next election on the issue of sovereignty.

Johnson administration

Although he sided with Lévesque on the sovereignty issue, Marcoux privately said in early 1985 that he believed Lévesque would need to resign as premier before the next election. When Lévesque resigned in June on the same year, Marcoux was one of the first backers of Pierre-Marc Johnson's successful leadership bid. He was kept as municipal affairs minister when Johnson announced his cabinet on October 3 and was given addition responsibilities as the minister responsible for planning on October 16.

Marcoux was narrowly defeated in Rimouski in the 1985 provincial election, in which the Liberals won a majority government.

== After politics ==
Marcoux returned to his administrative position at the Cégep de Rimouski in 1986. He also served as director-general of the Parti Québécois from 1986 to 1988, in which capacity he was responsible for improving the party's financial state. He supported the party's 1987 program, saying that it reaffirmed the PQ's social democratic policies while also stressing job creation and the environment. He stood down as director-general in 1988.

He was the director of intergovernmental relations for the Union des Municipalités du Québec from 1989 to 1991 and served as director-general of Sainte-Foy, Quebec from 1991 to 2001. Marcoux was later named as deputy director-general of Quebec City in 2001 and promoted to director-general in 2006.

== Electoral record ==
1985 Quebec general election: Rimouski
Party	Candidate	Votes	%	±%
Liberal	Michel Tremblay	15,116	48.78	
Parti Québécois	Alain Marcoux	14,832	47.87	
Union Nationale	Réal Saint-Laurent	853	2.75	–
Christian Socialist	Sylvain Bernard	185	0.60	
Total valid votes		30,986	100.00	
Rejected and declined votes		557		
Turnout		31,543	75.06	
Electors on the lists		42,024		

1981 Quebec general election: Rimouski
Party	Candidate	Votes	%	±%
Parti Québécois	Alain Marcoux	20,106	61.04	
Liberal	Georges Fafard	11,143	33.83	
Union Nationale	Maurice Bouillon	1,525	4.63	–
Workers Communist	Régine Valois	97	0.29	
Marxist–Leninist	Normand Fournier	66	0.20	
Total valid votes		32,937	100.00	
Rejected and declined votes		206		
Turnout		33,143	83.89	
Electors on the lists		39,507		

1976 Quebec general election: Rimouski
Party	Candidate	Votes	%	±%
Parti Québécois	Alain Marcoux	15,232	53.04	
Liberal	Claude St-Hilaire	10,086	35.12	
Union Nationale	Raynald Voyer	1,664	5.79	–
Ralliement créditiste	Alain Martel	1,651	5.75	
Independent	Yvar Tronstad	87	0.30	
Total valid votes		28,720	100.00	
Rejected and declined votes		605		
Turnout		29,325	86.34	
Electors on the lists		33,963		
