= Monique Roy Verville =

Canadian politician

MNA for La Prairie
- In office April 25, 2007 – November 5, 2008
- Preceded by: Jean Dubuc
- Succeeded by: François Rebello

Personal details
- Born: April 27, 1961 (age 65) Verdun, Quebec
- Party: Action démocratique du Québec (2007-2011); Conservative Party of Quebec (2012-present)
- Spouse: Marc Verville

Monique Roy Verville (born April 27, 1961 in Verdun, Quebec) is a politician from Quebec, Canada. Her surname is "Roy Verville". She was an Action démocratique du Québec Member of the National Assembly for the electoral district of La Prairie from 2007 to 2008.

She was the owner of a daycare center in Cold Lake, Alberta as well as in a military base in Germany. She also worked on numerous occasions with people with disabilities.

She was first elected in the 2007 election with 34% of the vote. Parti Québécois candidate François Rebello finished second with 31% of the vote, followed by Liberal incumbent Jean Dubuc (29%). Roy Verville took office on April 12, 2007. She was defeated in the 2008 election.

Roy Verville ran for the Conservative Party of Quebec in the 2012 election.

== Electoral record ==
2008 Quebec general election: La Prairie
Party	Candidate	Votes	%
Parti Québécois	François Rebello	16,382	44.83
Liberal	Marc Savard	13,678	37.43
Action démocratique	Monique Roy Verville	5,178	14.17
Québec solidaire	Danielle Maire	760	2.08
Independent	Martin McNeil	392	1.07
Marxist–Leninist	Normand Chouinard	150	0.41
Total valid votes		36,540	100.00
Rejected and declined votes		584	
Turnout		37,124	63.62
Electors on the lists		58,350	
Source: Official Results, Le Directeur général des élections du Québec.

2007 Quebec general election: La Prairie
Party	Candidate	Votes	%
Action démocratique	Monique Roy Verville	14,453	33.79
Parti Québécois	François Rebello	13,168	30.79
Liberal	Jean Dubuc	12,251	28.64
Green	Louis Corbeil	1,605	3.75
Québec solidaire	Antoine Pich	818	1.91
Bloc Pot	Guy Latour	238	0.56
Independent	Martin McNeil	179	0.42
Marxist–Leninist	Normand Chouinard	60	0.14
Total valid votes		42,772	100.00
Rejected and declined votes		442	
Turnout		43,214	77.50
Electors on the lists		55,758	
Source: Official Results, Le Directeur général des élections du Québec.
