= Auguste Tessier =

Canadian politician

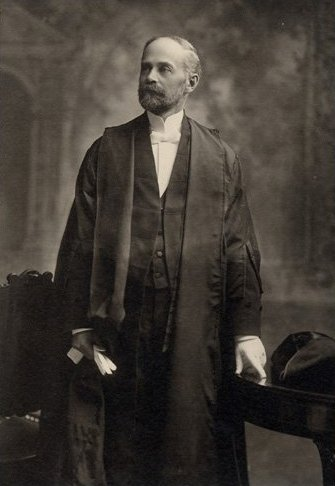

Member of the Legislative Assembly of Quebec for Rimouski
- In office 1889–1907
- Preceded by: Édouard-Onésiphore Martin
- Succeeded by: Pierre-Émile D'Anjou

Personal details
- Born: November 20, 1853 Quebec City, Canada East
- Died: February 10, 1938 (aged 84) Quebec City, Quebec
- Party: Liberal
- Relations: Ulric-Joseph Tessier, father

Auguste Tessier (November 20, 1853 – February 10, 1938) was a lawyer, judge and political figure in Quebec. He represented Rimouski in the Legislative Assembly of Quebec from 1889 to 1907 as a Liberal.

He was born in Notre-Dame de Québec, Canada East, the son of Ulric-Joseph Tessier and Marguerite-Adèle Kelly, and was educated at the Séminaire de Québec, the Collège Sainte-Marie de Montréal and the Université Laval. Tessier was called to the Quebec bar in 1876 and set up practice in Rimouski. In 1878, he married Corinne Gauvreau. He was mayor of Rimouski parish from 1889 to 1890, mayor of the town of Rimouski from 1889 to 1899 and warden for Rimouski County from 1885 to 1889. He was first elected to the Quebec assembly in an 1889 by-election held following the death of Édouard-Onésiphore Martin. In 1899, he was named Queen's Counsel. Tessier served as speaker for the assembly in March 1905 and then served in the provincial cabinet as Minister of Agriculture from 1905 to 1906 and as provincial treasurer from 1906 to 1907.

Tessier resigned his seat in the assembly in 1907 when he was named to the Quebec Superior Court for Rimouski district and, later that year, for Gaspé district. He retired from the bench in 1922. Tessier was also president of the agricultural society for Rimouski County. He died in Quebec City at the age of 84.

His brother Jules served in the Quebec assembly and the Canadian senate. His sister Marie-Anne-Adèle married Alexandre Chauveau. His son Auguste-Maurice and his grandson Maurice also served in the Quebec assembly.
