= François Rebello =

Canadian politician (born 1970)

MNA for La Prairie
- In office 2008–2012
- Preceded by: Monique Roy Verville
- Succeeded by: Stéphane Le Bouyonnec

Personal details
- Born: November 25, 1970 (age 55) Montreal, Quebec, Canada
- Party: Parti Québécois (2008–2012); Coalition Avenir Québec (2012–present)

François Rebello (born November 25, 1970) is a Canadian politician. Rebello is a former MNA in the province of Quebec. Rebello represented the riding of La Prairie in the National Assembly of Quebec in the 2008 provincial election, after an unsuccessful run in 2007. He was elected as a member of the Parti Québécois, but then joined the Coalition Avenir Québec. He was defeated in 2012.

On January 9, 2012, he announced he was joining the Coalition Avenir Québec, citing his admiration for its leader, François Legault. He had stated his loyalty to the Parti Québécois' chief, Pauline Marois, a couple of weeks prior to his defection. He was the CAQ's fifth member of the National Assembly and the third to be a former member of the Parti Québécois. In the 2012 provincial election, Rebello ran for the CAQ in the new electoral district of Sanguinet, but was defeated by Alain Therrien of the Parti Québécois.

== Electoral record ==
2008 Quebec general election: La Prairie
Party	Candidate	Votes	%
Parti Québécois	François Rebello	16,382	44.83
Liberal	Marc Savard	13,678	37.43
Action démocratique	Monique Roy Verville	5,178	14.17
Québec solidaire	Danielle Maire	760	2.08
Independent	Martin McNeil	392	1.07
Marxist–Leninist	Normand Chouinard	150	0.41
Total valid votes		36,540	100.00
Rejected and declined votes		584	
Turnout		37,124	63.62
Electors on the lists		58,350	
Source: Official Results, Le Directeur général des élections du Québec.

2007 Quebec general election: La Prairie
Party	Candidate	Votes	%
Action démocratique	Monique Roy Verville	14,453	33.79
Parti Québécois	François Rebello	13,168	30.79
Liberal	Jean Dubuc	12,251	28.64
Green	Louis Corbeil	1,605	3.75
Québec solidaire	Antoine Pich	818	1.91
Bloc Pot	Guy Latour	238	0.56
Independent	Martin McNeil	179	0.42
Marxist–Leninist	Normand Chouinard	60	0.14
Total valid votes		42,772	100.00
Rejected and declined votes		442	
Turnout		43,214	77.50
Electors on the lists		55,758	
Source: Official Results, Le Directeur général des élections du Québec.
