= E. B. Eddy Company =

Canadian pulp and paper company

The E. B. Eddy Company was a Canadian pulp and paper company, now a division of Domtar Inc. At the time of the purchase, the company had facilities in Hull, Quebec, Timmins, Ontario, Espanola, Ontario, Chapleau, Ontario, Pembroke, Ontario, Sault Ste. Marie, Ontario, Delta, British Columbia and Port Huron, Michigan.

== History ==
The E. B. Eddy Manufacturing Company was originally incorporated in 1886 as with Ezra Butler Eddy as its president. Eddy had begun business in 1854 making and selling wooden matches out of his home in Hull, Canada East (now Quebec). The company expanded into pulp and paper. In 1891, it was renamed to the E. B. Eddy Company.

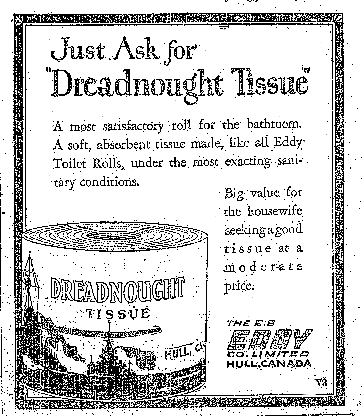
EB Eddy "Dreadnought" toilet tissue ad from 1927.

On April 26, 1900, a large fire destroyed most of the company's facilities, but it was back in operation in less than a year. Eddy died in 1906. In 1926, R.B. Bennett gained control of the company.

In 1943, the company was sold to George Weston, Ltd. The company acquired the paper mills of the J.R. Booth Company in 1946.

In 1998, the company was taken over by Domtar Inc. and became the E. B. Eddy Division of that company.

=== Eddy Match Company ===
E. B. Eddy sold off its match division in 1927 and it was merged with World Match Corp. Ltd., Dominion Match Co. Ltd. and Canadian Match Co. Ltd.. The company became the first manufacturer of book matches in Canada in 1929 and was the largest producer of this product in Canada. Its operations included a second plant in Mission, British Columbia.

Eddy Match had a capital structure where 2/3 of the stock were held by British Match Corporation in London, England and 1/3 by Diamond Match in the United States. In the 1950s, Diamond Match sold its shares to the public in Canada by listing on the Toronto Stock Exchange. J. Alex Lawrason became President and CEO in June 1969 in Toronto, Ontario. He had joined the company in Vancouver, British Columbia in 1949, as a salesman. Other operations included:

- Ideal Vendor Company in Deseronto, Ontario which manufactured vending machines. Ideal Vendors made a variety of soft drink vending machines. The Sales office (& HO) of Ideal was in the Sun Life Building in Montreal. The last president was Dudley Sutherland. He travelled the world selling these machines and spent a lot of time doing so in Africa. The machine was unique in that it was a top-opener - the bottles were held on a rack by the neck. There were a number of parallel racks. The bottles were more air-cooled than cold. Inserting a coin allowed one bottle to be moved down the rack and out the dispensing end.
- Steel Equipment in Pembroke which manufactured steel office furniture
- Grant Industries in Vancouver which distributed building products. This company was identified as one of the Canadian distributors of zonolite products contaminated with asbestos which originated from Libby, Montana. The company was purchased in the mid-1950s and had branches right across Canada. The company was shut down and liquidated in 1971.
- Kootenay Forest Products in Nelson, British Columbia
- Harrow Lumber Company in Nelson, British Columbia
- Insulation Industries
- Eddy Match Co. in Berthierville, Quebec
- Eddy industrial Products. Started as a machine shop and in due course was manufacturing high-speed packaging machinery for light bulbs all of which were shipped to customers in the United States.
- W. W. Powell in Nelson, British Columbia. The company manufactured match blocks. The company was purchased in 1949 and closed in approximately 1954
- The Michigan Sulphite Fibre Co. later Port Huron Sulphite and Paper Co. opened in 1888, manufacturing paper clothing at a factory in Port Huron, Michigan. The company later transitioned to more specialty types of paper, and was sold to E.B. Eddy in 1987, its only US mill.

The company operated a match factory in Pembroke, Ontario until 1998. Eddy Match was merged with Atlas Match of Euless, Texas in 1998, which itself was acquired by D. D. Bean of Jaffrey, New Hampshire in 2016.
