= Césaire Thérien =

Canadian politician

Member of the Legislative Assembly of Quebec for Laprairie
- In office 1867–1871
- Succeeded by: Andrew Esinhart

Personal details
- Born: January 12, 1824 L'Assomption, Lower Canada
- Died: February 9, 1890 (aged 66) Verchères, Quebec
- Party: Conservative

Césaire Thérien (January 12, 1824 – February 9, 1890) was a merchant and political figure in Quebec. He represented Laprairie in the Legislative Assembly of Quebec from 1867 to 1871 as a Conservative member.

He was born in L'Assomption, Lower Canada, the son of Jean-Baptiste Thérien and Apolline Gariépy. Thérien married Marie-Félonise Colette in 1852. He worked as a clerk in his father-in-law Paul Colette's store before establishing himself as a merchant in Saint-Isidore. Thérien was mayor of Saint-Isidore from 1866 to 1868. After the death of his first wife, he married Ézilda Mazurette, dit Lapierre. He died in Verchères at the age of 66.

His widow married Louis Duhamel, who also served in the Quebec assembly.
