= Andrew Esinhart =

Canadian politician

Member of the Legislative Assembly of Quebec for Laprairie
- In office 1871–1875
- Preceded by: Césaire Thérien
- Succeeded by: Léon-Benoît-Alfred Charlebois

Personal details
- Born: December 27, 1838 La Prairie, Lower Canada
- Died: c. 1915 United States
- Party: Conservative

Andrew Esinhart (December 27, 1838 – ca 1915) was a merchant and political figure in Quebec. He represented La Prairie in the Legislative Assembly of Quebec from 1871 to 1875 as a Conservative.

He was born in La Prairie, Lower Canada, the son of Andrew Eisenhart and Charlotte Barbeau, and became a merchant there. Esinhart owned a sawmill at Sainte-Clothilde and also operated a brick factory which failed in 1870. In 1867, he married Marie-Ézelda Valotte. He was defeated by Léon-Benoît-Alfred Charlebois when he ran for reelection to the Quebec assembly in 1875. In 1876, he moved to Iberville, where he owned a general store and grain warehouse. Esinhart was mayor of Iberville from 1882 to 1883. He later moved to the United States, where he died around 1915.
