= Yohann St-Pierre =

Canadian politician

Yohann St-Pierre MNA

Member of the National Assembly for Rimouski
- Incumbent
- Assumed office October 5, 2026
- Preceded by: Maïté Blanchette Vézina

Personal details
- Party: Parti Québécois

Yohann St-Pierre is a Canadian politician who is a candidate for the National Assembly of Quebec for Rimouski in the 2026 Quebec general election as a member of the Parti Québécois.

St-Pierre is a pediatrician.

== Electoral record ==
2026 Quebec general election: Rimouski
** Preliminary results — Not yet official **
Party	Candidate	Votes	%	±%
Parti Québécois	Yohann St-Pierre	14,189	43.35	
Coalition Avenir Québec	Julia Brillant-Ruest	5,796	17.71	
Québec solidaire	Virginie Chevalier-Archambault	4,923	15.04	
Conservative	Cédric Gauthier	4,322	13.21	
Liberal	Michel Bienvenu	3,095	9.46	
Parti nul	Thomas Guay-Vachon	212	0.65	
Climat Québec	Gilles Gagné	193	0.59	
Total valid votes				
Total rejected ballots				
Turnout			71.15	
Electors on the lists			–	–
Parti Québécois gain from Coalition Avenir Québec		Swing		+
Source: Élections Québec
