= Joseph Parent =

Canadian politician

Joseph Parent (January 8, 1835 – June 29, 1912) was a farmer, merchant and political figure in Quebec. He represented Rimouski in the Legislative Assembly of Quebec from 1880 to 1881 as a Liberal.

He was born in Rimouski, Lower Canada, the son of Pierre Parent and Madeleine Gagné. He was married twice: to Angèle Caron in 1859 and to Hermine Chouinard in 1890. He was elected to the Quebec assembly in an 1880 by-election held after Alexandre Chauveau was named a judge. Parent was defeated by Louis-Napoléon Asselin when he ran for reelection in 1881. He died in Quebec City at the age of 77 and was buried at Sainte-Foy.
