= Auguste-Maurice Tessier =

Canadian politician

Auguste-Maurice Tessier (July 20, 1879 – May 26, 1932) was a lawyer, judge and political figure in Quebec. He represented Rimouski in the Legislative Assembly of Quebec from 1912 to 1922 as a Liberal.

He was born in Rimouski, Quebec, the son of Auguste Tessier and Corinne Gauvreau, and was educated at the Séminaire de Québec and the Université Laval. Tessier articled in law with Charles Fitzpatrick, was called to the bar in 1901 and set up practice in Richmond and then in Rimouski with his father. In 1907, he married Yvonne, the daughter of Alexandre Lacoste. He was crown attorney at Rimouski from 1909 to 1912. In 1912, he was named King's Counsel. Tessier was also president of the agricultural society for Rimouski County. He resigned his seat in the assembly in 1922 after he was named a judge in the Quebec Superior Court. He died in Quebec City at the age of 52.

His son Maurice also served in the Quebec assembly.
