= La Prairie (provincial electoral district) =

Provincial electoral district in Quebec, Canada

Quebec electoral district
- Coordinates: 45.382°N 73.467°W

Provincial electoral district
- Legislature: National Assembly of Quebec
MNA
Sonia Ziadé
Liberal
- District created: 1867
- District abolished: 1922
- District re-created: 1972
- First contested: 1867, 1973
- Last contested: 1923, 2026

Demographics
- Population (2006): 76,004
- Electors (2012): 41,572
- Area (km²): 143.2
- Pop. density (per km²): 530.8
- Census division: Roussillon (part)
- Census subdivision(s): Candiac, Delson, La Prairie, Saint-Philippe

La Prairie (French pronunciation: [la pʁɛʁi]) is a provincial electoral district in Quebec, Canada, that elects members to the National Assembly of Quebec. It notably consists of the city of La Prairie and three other smaller cities. Prior to 1988, it was spelled as one word: Laprairie.

It was originally created for the 1867 election (and an electoral district of that name existed earlier in the Legislative Assembly of the Province of Canada and the Legislative Assembly of Lower Canada). Its final election was in 1919. It disappeared in the 1923 election and its successor electoral district was Napierville-Laprairie. It was recreated in for the 1973 election from parts of Chambly and Napierville-Laprairie.

In the change from the 2001 to the 2011 electoral map, it lost Saint-Constant and Saint-Mathieu to the newly created Sanguinet electoral district.

== Members of the Legislative Assembly / National Assembly ==
Legislature	Years	Member	Party
Laprairie
1st	1867–1871	Césaire Thérien	Conservative
2nd	1871–1875	Andrew Esinhart	Conservative
3rd	1875–1878	Léon-Benoît-Alfred Charlebois	Conservative
4th	1878–1881	Léon-Benoît-Alfred Charlebois	Conservative
5th	1881–1886	Léon-Benoît-Alfred Charlebois	Conservative
6th	1886–1887†	Léon-Benoît-Alfred Charlebois	Conservative
6th	1887–1889	Odilon Goyette	Parti national
6th	1889–1890	Odilon Goyette	Parti national
7th	1890–1892	Georges Duhamel	Parti national
8th	1892–1897	Cyrille Doyon	Conservative
9th	1897–1900	Côme-Séraphin Cherrier	Liberal
10th	1900–1904	Côme-Séraphin Cherrier	Liberal
11th	1904–1908	Côme-Séraphin Cherrier	Liberal
12th	1908–1912	Esioff-Léon Patenaude	Conservative
13th	1912–1916	Esioff-Léon Patenaude	Conservative
14th	1916–1919	Wilfrid Cédilot	Liberal
15th	1919–1923	Wilfrid Cédilot	Liberal
Riding dissolved into Napierville-Laprairie
Riding re-created from Napierville-Laprairie
30th	1973–1976	Paul Berthiaume	Liberal
31st	1976–1981	Gilles Michaud	Parti Québécois
32nd	1981–1985	Jean-Pierre Saintonge	Liberal
33rd	1985–1989	Jean-Pierre Saintonge	Liberal
La Prairie
34th	1989–1994	Denis Lazure	Parti Québécois
35th	1994–1996	Denis Lazure	Parti Québécois
35th	1996–1998	Monique Simard	Parti Québécois
36th	1998–2003	Serge Geoffrion	Parti Québécois
37th	2003–2007	Jean Dubuc	Liberal
38th	2007–2008	Monique Roy Verville	Action démocratique
39th	2008–2012	François Rebello	Parti Québécois
39th	2012–2012	François Rebello	Coalition Avenir Québec
40th	2012–2014	Stéphane Le Bouyonnec	Coalition Avenir Québec
41st	2014–2018	Richard Merlini	Liberal
42nd	2018–2022	Christian Dubé	Coalition Avenir Québec
43rd	2022–2025	Christian Dubé	Coalition Avenir Québec
43rd	2025–2026	Christian Dubé	Independent
44th	2026–Present	Sonia Ziadé	Liberal

== Election results ==
2026 Quebec general election
** Preliminary results — Not yet official **
Party	Candidate	Votes	%	±%
Liberal	Sonia Ziadé	11,370	31.01	+17.16
Parti Québécois	Frédéric Côté	10,719	29.24	+17.82
Coalition Avenir Québec	Pierre Guillot-Hurtubise	6,087	16.60	–36.11
Conservative	Marie Pelletier	4,989	13.61	+5.66
Québec solidaire	Francine Van Winden	3,242	8.84	–4.26
Climat Québec	Barbara Joannette	198	0.54	–0.27
Marxist–Leninist	Hélène Héroux	57	0.16	+0.02
Total valid votes		36,662	98.69	–0.36
Total rejected ballots		486	1.31	+0.36
Turnout		37,148	73.02	+0.52
Electors on the lists		50,872		
Liberal gain from Coalition Avenir Québec		Swing		–0.33
Source: Élections Québec

2022 Quebec general election
Party	Candidate	Votes	%	±%
Coalition Avenir Québec	Christian Dubé	18,229	52.71	+9.57
Liberal	Julie Guertin	4,791	13.85	–10.14
Québec solidaire	Pierre-Marc Allaire-Daly	4,531	13.10	+0.03
Parti Québécois	Sarah Joly-Simard	3,950	11.42	–4.31
Conservative	Marie Pelletier	2,751	7.95	+6.82
Climat Québec	Barbara Joannette	281	0.81	–
Marxist–Leninist	Normand Chouinard	50	0.14	+0.02
Total valid votes		34,583	99.05	+0.66
Total rejected ballots		330	0.95	–0.66
Turnout		34,913	72.50	–2.85
Electors on the lists		48,158	–	–

2018 Quebec general election
Party	Candidate	Votes	%	±%
Coalition Avenir Québec	Christian Dubé	14,511	43.14	+10.52
Liberal	Richard Merlini	8,069	23.99	-9.96
Parti Québécois	Cathy Lepage	5,290	15.73	-10.52
Québec solidaire	Daniel Blouin	4,362	12.97	+7.05
Green	Alexandre Caron	694	2.06	
Conservative	Alain Desmarais	379	1.13	
New Democratic	Boukare Tall	222	0.66	
Parti 51	Liana Minato	66	0.2	
Marxist–Leninist	Normand Chouinard	41	0.12	
Total valid votes		33,634	98.39	
Total rejected ballots		549	1.61	
Turnout		34,183	74.85	
Eligible voters		45,669		
Coalition Avenir Québec gain from Liberal		Swing		+10.24
Source(s) "Rapport des résultats officiels du scrutin". Élections Québec.

2014 Quebec general election
Party	Candidate	Votes	%	±%
Liberal	Richard Merlini	11,110	33.95	+6.45
Coalition Avenir Québec	Stéphane Le Bouyonnec	10,675	32.62	+0.22
Parti Québécois	Pierre Langois	8,591	26.30	-6.10
Québec solidaire	Marilou André	1,938	5.90	+2.40
Option nationale	Jean-Pierre Gouin	162	0.50	
Conservative	Guy L’Heureux	162	0.50	
Marxist–Leninist	Normand Chouinard	85	0.30	+0.20
Total valid votes		32,723	98.56	–
Total rejected ballots		478	1.44	–
Turnout		33,201	78.27	
Electors on the lists		42,419	–	–
Liberal gain from Coalition Avenir Québec		Swing		+1.35

2012 Quebec general election
Party	Candidate	Votes	%	±%
Coalition Avenir Québec	Stéphane Le Bouyonnec	11,094	32.64	+19.56
Parti Québécois	Pierre Langlois	11,019	32.42	-9.70
Liberal	Lucie F. Roussel	9,338	27.48	-13.96
Québec solidaire	Yohan Perron	1,195	3.52	+1.46
Option nationale	Jean-Pierre Gouin	473	1.39	
Green	Kevin Murphy	469	1.38	
Coalition pour la constituante	Adrian Ahsly Gutierrez	179	0.53	
Conservative	Monique Roy-Verville	172	0.51	
Marxist–Leninist	Normand Chouinard	48	0.14	-0.21
Total valid votes		33,987	98.78	–
Total rejected ballots		419	1.22	–
Turnout		34,406	82.45	
Electors on the lists		41,728	–	–
^ Change is from redistributed results. CAQ change is from ADQ.
Coalition Avenir Québec gain from Parti Québécois		Swing		+14.63

2008 Quebec general election
Party	Candidate	Votes	%
Parti Québécois	François Rebello	16,382	44.83
Liberal	Marc Savard	13,678	37.43
Action démocratique	Monique Roy Verville	5,178	14.17
Québec solidaire	Danielle Maire	760	2.08
Independent	Martin McNeil	392	1.07
Marxist–Leninist	Normand Chouinard	150	0.41
Total valid votes		36,540	100.00
Rejected and declined votes		584	
Turnout		37,124	63.62
Electors on the lists		58,350	
Source: Official Results, Le Directeur général des élections du Québec.

2007 Quebec general election
Party	Candidate	Votes	%
Action démocratique	Monique Roy Verville	14,453	33.79
Parti Québécois	François Rebello	13,168	30.79
Liberal	Jean Dubuc	12,251	28.64
Green	Louis Corbeil	1,605	3.75
Québec solidaire	Antoine Pich	818	1.91
Bloc Pot	Guy Latour	238	0.56
Independent	Martin McNeil	179	0.42
Marxist–Leninist	Normand Chouinard	60	0.14
Total valid votes		42,772	100.00
Rejected and declined votes		442	
Turnout		43,214	77.50
Electors on the lists		55,758	
Source: Official Results, Le Directeur général des élections du Québec.

== See also ==
- List of Quebec provincial electoral districts
- Canadian provincial electoral districts
