= Adolphe-François Savaria =

Canadian politician (1848–1929)

Adolphe-François Savaria (May 21, 1848 – July 16, 1929) was a merchant and political figure in Quebec. He represented Shefford in the Legislative Assembly of Quebec from 1892 to 1897 as a Conservative.

== Early life ==
He was born in Saint-Pie, Canada East, the son of Isidore Savaria and Josephte Messier, and established himself as a merchant in Waterloo.

== Career ==
He served on the municipal council for Waterloo and was mayor from 1892 to 1894. Savaria ran unsuccessfully for a seat in the Quebec assembly in 1886 and 1888. He was defeated by Tancrède Boucher de Grosbois when he ran for reelection in 1897. Savaria served as postmaster for Waterloo from 1915 to 1929.

== Family ==
He was married twice: to Zoé Marin in 1872 and to Adéline Benoît in 1895.

== Death ==
Savaria died in Waterloo at the age of 81.
