= Joseph Garon =

Canadian politician

Member of the Legislative Assembly of Quebec for Rimouski
- In office 1867–1871
- Succeeded by: Louis Honoré Gosselin

Personal details
- Born: May 8, 1814 Rivière-Ouelle, Lower Canada
- Died: October 17, 1890 (aged 76) Montreal, Quebec
- Party: Conservative

Joseph Garon (May 8, 1814 – October 17, 1890) was a notary and political figure in Quebec. He represented Rimouski in the Legislative Assembly of Quebec from 1867 to 1871 as a Conservative.

He was born in Rivière-Ouelle, Lower Canada, the son of Régis Garon and Marie-Louise Hudon dit Beaulieu. He qualified as a notary in 1835 and set up practice in Rimouski. In 1846, Garon married Éliza Garon, the daughter of another notary. He was one of the directors of the mutual fire assurance company for Rimouski, Témiscouata and Kamouraska counties. Garon ran unsuccessfully to represent Rimouski in the legislative assembly of the Province of Canada in 1854, 1858 and 1861 and he was defeated when he ran for reelection to the Quebec assembly in 1871. He died in Montreal at the age of 76.
