= Harold LeBel =

Canadian politician

Member of the National Assembly of Quebec for Rimouski
- In office April 7, 2014 – August 28, 2022
- Preceded by: Irvin Pelletier
- Succeeded by: Maïté Blanchette Vézina

Personal details
- Born: June 22, 1962 (age 64) Squatec, Quebec, Canada
- Party: Independent
- Other political affiliations: Parti Québécois (2014-2020)

Harold LeBel (French pronunciation: [a.ʁɔld lə.bɛl]; born June 22, 1962) is a former Canadian politician who was elected to the National Assembly of Quebec in the 2014 election. He represented the electoral district of Rimouski as a member of the Parti Québécois until 2022.

In 2022, he was convicted as a sex offender in Quebec.

== Biography ==
Lebel was a candidate for the Parti Québécois three times before being elected, running in Rivière-du-Loup in the 1989 election and the 1994 election, and in Kamouraska-Témiscouata in the 2003 election.

In April 2014, he was elected Member of the National Assembly of Quebec for Rimouski. He was reelected in 2018.

On December 15, 2020, he was arrested following allegations of sexual assault against Catherine Fournier, a former member of the National Assembly and mayor of Longueuil, dating back to 2017. He was released later that day, and subsequently expelled from the PQ caucus, pending further investigations.

LeBel was found guilty on November 23, 2022, of sexually assaulting Fournier at his residence in 2017.

On January 26, 2023, at the courthouse of Rimouski, he was sentenced to eight months of imprisonment.

On March 21, 2023, after expressing remorse for his crime during therapies in prison, LeBel was granted parole.

== Electoral record ==
2018 Quebec general election: Rimouski
| Party | Candidate | Votes | % | ±% |
|---|---|---|---|---|
| Parti Québécois | Harold LeBel | 13,940 | 43.92 | +3.34 |
| Coalition Avenir Québec | Nancy Levesque | 7,903 | 24.90 | +14.15 |
| Québec solidaire | Carol-Ann Kack | 5,531 | 17.43 | +1.06 |
| Liberal | Claude Laroche | 3,914 | 12.33 | -17.66 |
| Green | Alexie Plourde | 220 | 0.69 | – |
| Independent | Denis Bélanger | 123 | 0.39 | – |
| Bloc Pot | Dany Levesque | 106 | 0.33 | -0.14 |
| Total valid votes | | 31,737 | 99.12 | |
| Total rejected ballots | | 282 | 0.88 | |
| Turnout | | 32,019 | 70.25 | +2.98 |
| Eligible voters | | 45,580 | | |
| Parti Québécois hold | | Swing | | -5.41 |
Source(s) "Rapport des résultats officiels du scrutin". Élections Québec.

2014 Quebec general election
| Party | Candidate | Votes | % | ±% |
|---|---|---|---|---|
| Parti Québécois | Harold LeBel | 12,028 | 40.58 | -7.77 |
| Liberal | Pierre Huot | 8,888 | 29.99 | +8.03 |
| Québec solidaire | Marie-Neige Besner | 4,851 | 16.37 | +9.08 |
| Coalition Avenir Québec | Steven Fleurent | 3,186 | 10.75 | -6.45 |
| Option nationale | Pierre Beaudoin | 327 | 1.10 | -1.65 |
| Parti nul | Pier-Luc Gagnon | 219 | 0.74 | +0.19 |
| Bloc Pot | Tom-Henri Cyr | 138 | 0.47 | – |
| Total valid votes | | 29,637 | 98.58 | – |
| Total rejected ballots | | 426 | 1.42 | – |
| Turnout | | 30,063 | 67.27 | -8.29 |
| Electors on the lists | | 44,687 | – | – |

2003 Quebec general election: Kamouraska-Témiscouata
| Party | Candidate | Votes | % | ±% |
|---|---|---|---|---|
| Liberal | Claude Béchard | 11,266 | 45.75 | +2.26 |
| Action démocratique | Pierre Lévesque | 6,504 | 26.41 | +14.25 |
| Parti Québécois | Harold LeBel | 6,326 | 25.69 | -17.37 |
| Green | Guy Duguay | 293 | 1.19 | - |
| Independent | Raymond Robert | 238 | 0.97 | - |

1994 Quebec general election: Rivière-du-Loup
| Party | Candidate | Votes | % | ±% |
|---|---|---|---|---|
| Action démocratique | Mario Dumont | 13,307 | 54.77 | – |
| Parti Québécois | Harold LeBel | 6,608 | 27.20 | -14.85 |
| Liberal | Jean D'Amour | 4,226 | 17.39 | -37.09 |
| Independent | L. Richard Cimon | 99 | 0.41 | – |
| Natural Law | Armand Pouliot | 55 | 0.23 | – |

1989 Quebec general election: Rivière-du-Loup
| Party | Candidate | Votes | % | ±% |
|---|---|---|---|---|
| Liberal | Albert Côté | 11,317 | 54.48 | +1.16 |
| Parti Québécois | Harold LeBel | 8,736 | 42.05 | -0.77 |
| Marxist–Leninist | Pierre-Paul Malenfant | 720 | 3.47 | – |
