= Isidore Frégeau =

Canadian politician

Isidore Frégeau (December 9, 1833 – September 2, 1906) was a physician and political figure in Quebec. He represented Shefford in the Legislative Assembly of Quebec from 1881 to 1886 as a Conservative.

He was born in Saint-Pie, the son of Jean-Baptiste Frégeau and Angélique Lemonde. He qualified to practise medicine in 1861 and practised in North Stukely, Lawrenceville, Waterloo and Sherbrooke. He was married twice: to Marie-Onésime-Caroline Tétro-Ducharme in 1862 and to Hermine Simoneau in 1887. Frégeau was mayor of North Stukely for 10 years. He died in Sherbrooke at the age of 72.
