= Tancrède Boucher de Grosbois =

Canadian politician (1846–1926)

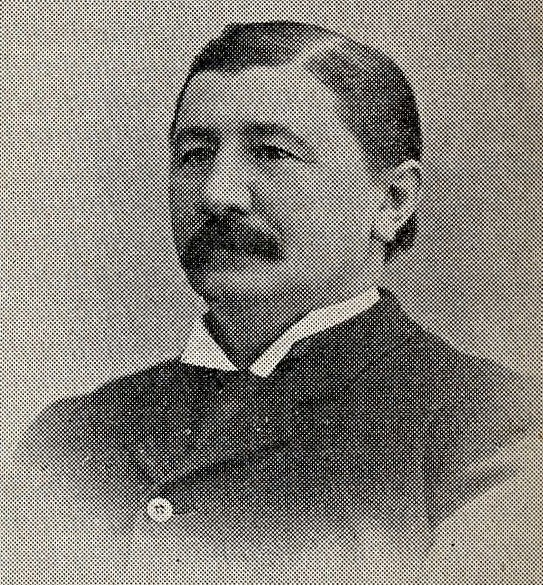
Tancrède Boucher de Grosbois

Tancrède Boucher de Grosbois (November 6, 1846 – September 30, 1926) was a physician and political figure in Quebec. He represented Shefford in the Legislative Assembly of Quebec from 1888 to 1892 and from 1897 to 1903 as a Liberal.

He was born in Chambly, Canada East, the son of Dr. Charles-Henri Boucher de Grosbois and Émilie-Magdeleine Boucher de Boucherville, the daughter of seigneur Pierre-Amable Boucher de Boucherville. Boucher de Grosbois was educated privately, then at the Collège de Saint-Hyacinthe and McGill University. He received his qualifications as a doctor in 1868 and practised in Longueuil, Saint-Bruno-de-Montarville, Roxton Falls and Chambly. In 1870, he was married to Dorothée Bruneau. He was an unsuccessful candidate for the Canadian House of Commons in 1872 and for a seat in the Quebec assembly in 1881. Boucher de Grosbois was first elected in an 1888 by-election held after the death of Thomas Brassard and was reelected in 1890. He was defeated by Adolphe-François Savaria in 1892 and then was reelected in 1897. He resigned from politics in 1903 and returned to the practice of medicine. He was assistant medical director for the Hôpital Saint-Jean-de-Dieu in Montreal from 1918 to 1920. He died in Montreal at the age of 79 and was buried in the Notre Dame des Neiges Cemetery.

His uncle Charles-Eugène Boucher de Boucherville served as Quebec premier.
