= Maïté Blanchette Vézina =

Canadian politician

Maïté Blanchette Vézina MNA
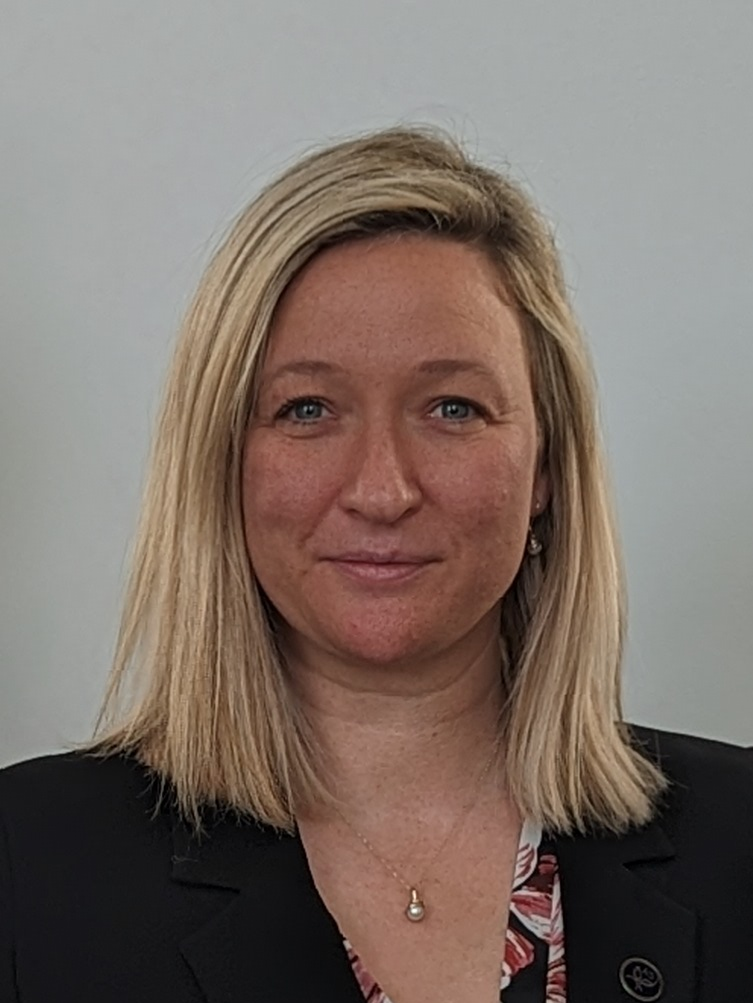
- Vézina in 2023

Parliamentary leader of the Conservative Party of Quebec
- Incumbent
- Assumed office October 7, 2026
- Leader: Éric Duhaime
- Preceded by: Office established

Member of the National Assembly for La Peltrie
- Incumbent
- Assumed office October 5, 2026
- Preceded by: Éric Caire

Minister of Natural Resources and Forestry of Quebec
- In office October 20, 2022 – September 10, 2025
- Premier: François Legault
- Preceded by: Jonatan Julien
- Succeeded by: Jean-François Simard

Member of the National Assembly for Rimouski
- In office October 3, 2022 – October 5, 2026
- Preceded by: Harold LeBel
- Succeeded by: Yohann St-Pierre

Personal details
- Born: 1985 (age 40–41) Montmagny, Quebec
- Party: Conservative Party of Quebec (since 2026)
- Other political affiliations: Independent (2025–2026); Coalition Avenir Québec (2022–2025)

Maïté Blanchette Vézina MNA is a Canadian politician who was elected to the National Assembly of Quebec in the 2022 Quebec general election. She first represented the riding of Rimouski, having been elected under the banner of the Coalition Avenir Québec. In 2025, she left the CAQ and began to sit as an independent. In 2026, she joined the Conservative Party of Quebec and announced that she would seek re-election in La Peltrie. She previously served as mayor of Sainte-Luce, Quebec.

== Electoral record ==
2022 Quebec general election: Rimouski
Party	Candidate	Votes	%	±%
Coalition Avenir Québec	Maïté Blanchette Vézina	13,761	41.75	+16.86
Parti Québécois	Samuel Ouellet	9,440	28.64	–15.28
Québec solidaire	Carol-Ann Kack	7,042	21.37	+3.94
Conservative	Stéphanie Du Mesnil	1,566	4.75	New
Liberal	Claude Laroche	992	3.01	–9.32
Climat Québec	Pierre Beaudoin	104	0.32	New
Démocratie directe	Danielle Mélanie Gaudreau	55	0.17	New
Total valid votes		32,960	99.18	
Total rejected ballots		274	0.82	–0.06
Turnout		33,234	71.60	+1.35
Electors on the lists		46,416		
Coalition Avenir Québec gain from Parti Québécois		Swing		+16.07
Source: Élections Québec
