= Sonia Ziadé =

Quebec politician

Sonia Ziadé MNA

Member of the National Assembly for La Prairie
- Incumbent
- Assumed office October 5, 2026
- Preceded by: Christian Dubé

Personal details
- Party: Liberal

Sonia Ziadé is a Quebec politician who was the elected to the National Assembly of Quebec for La Prairie in the 2026 Quebec general election as a member of the Quebec Liberal Party. She comes from Montreal's South Shore.
