= Rimouski (provincial electoral district) =

Provincial electoral district in Quebec, Canada

Coordinates: 48.281°N 68.402°W

Quebec electoral district

Provincial electoral district
- Legislature: National Assembly of Quebec
MNA
Yohann St-Pierre
Parti Québécois
- District created: 1867
- First contested: 1867
- Last contested: 2026

Demographics
- Electors (2012): 43,920
- Area (km²): 3,723.2
- Census subdivision(s): Esprit-Saint, La Trinité-des-Monts, Rimouski, Saint-Anaclet-de-Lessard, Saint-Eugène-de-Ladrière, Saint-Fabien, Saint-Marcellin, Saint-Narcisse-de-Rimouski, Saint-Valérien; Lac-Huron

Rimouski (French pronunciation: [ʁimuski]) is a provincial electoral district in the Bas-Saint-Laurent region of Quebec, Canada, that elects members to the National Assembly of Quebec. It notably includes the municipalities of Rimouski and Saint-Anaclet-de-Lessard.

It was created for the 1867 election (and an electoral district of that name existed earlier in the Legislative Assembly of the Province of Canada and the Legislative Assembly of Lower Canada).

In the change from the 2001 to the 2011 electoral map, it lost Lac-des-Aigles and Biencourt to the newly created Rivière-du-Loup–Témiscouata electoral district.

== Members of the Legislative Assembly / National Assembly ==
| Legislature | Years | Member | Party |
|---|---|---|---|
| 1st | 1867–1871 | Joseph Garon | Conservative |
| 2nd | 1871–1872 | Louis-Honoré Gosselin | Conservative |
| 2nd | 1872–1875 | Alexandre Chauveau | Conservative |
| 3rd | 1875–1878 | Alexandre Chauveau | Independent |
| 4th | 1878–1880 | Alexandre Chauveau | Liberal |
| 4th | 1880–1881 | Joseph Parent | Liberal |
| 5th | 1881–1886 | Louis-Napoléon Asselin | Conservative |
| 6th | 1886–1889† | Édouard-Onésiphore Martin | Liberal |
| 6th | 1889–1890 | Auguste Tessier | Liberal |
| 7th | 1890–1892 | Auguste Tessier | Liberal |
| 8th | 1892–1897 | Auguste Tessier | Liberal |
| 9th | 1897–1900 | Auguste Tessier | Liberal |
| 10th | 1900–1904 | Auguste Tessier | Liberal |
| 11th | 1904–1905 | Auguste Tessier | Liberal |
| 11th | 1905–1907 | Auguste Tessier | Liberal |
| 11th | 1907–1908 | Pierre-Émile D'Anjou | Liberal |
| 12th | 1908–1912 | Louis-Joseph Moreault | Liberal |
| 13th | 1912–1916 | Auguste-Maurice Tessier | Liberal |
| 14th | 1916–1919 | Auguste-Maurice Tessier | Liberal |
| 15th | 1919–1923 | Auguste-Maurice Tessier | Liberal |
| 16th | 1923–1927 | Louis-Joseph Moreault | Liberal |
| 17th | 1927–1931 | Louis-Joseph Moreault | Liberal |
| 18th | 1931–1935 | Louis-Joseph Moreault | Liberal |
| 19th | 1935–1936 | Louis-Joseph Moreault | Liberal |
| 20th | 1936–1939 | Alfred Dubé | Union Nationale |
| 21st | 1939–1944 | Louis-Joseph Moreault | Liberal |
| 22nd | 1944–1948 | Alfred Dubé | Union Nationale |
| 23rd | 1948–1952 | Alfred Dubé | Union Nationale |
| 24th | 1952–1956 | Alfred Dubé | Union Nationale |
| 25th | 1956–1960 | Albert Dionne | Liberal |
| 26th | 1960–1962 | Albert Dionne | Liberal |
| 27th | 1962–1966 | Albert Dionne | Liberal |
| 28th | 1966–1970 | Maurice Tessier | Liberal |
| 29th | 1970–1973 | Maurice Tessier | Liberal |
| 30th | 1973–1976 | Claude St-Hilaire | Liberal |
| 31st | 1976–1981 | Alain Marcoux | Parti Québécois |
| 32nd | 1981–1985 | Alain Marcoux | Parti Québécois |
| 33rd | 1985–1989 | Michel Tremblay | Liberal |
| 34th | 1989–1994 | Michel Tremblay | Liberal |
| 35th | 1994–1998 | Solange Charest | Parti Québécois |
| 36th | 1998–2003 | Solange Charest | Parti Québécois |
| 37th | 2003–2007 | Solange Charest | Parti Québécois |
| 38th | 2007–2008 | Irvin Pelletier | Parti Québécois |
| 39th | 2008–2012 | Irvin Pelletier | Parti Québécois |
| 40th | 2012–2014 | Irvin Pelletier | Parti Québécois |
| 41st | 2014–2018 | Harold LeBel | Parti Québécois |
| 42nd | 2018–2020 | Harold LeBel | Parti Québécois |
| 42nd | 2020–2022 | Harold LeBel | Independent |
| 43rd | 2022–2025 | Maïté Blanchette Vézina | Coalition Avenir Québec |
| 43rd | 2025–2026 | Maïté Blanchette Vézina | Independent |
| 43rd | 2026–2026 | Maïté Blanchette Vézina | Conservative |
| 44th | 2026–Present | Yohann St-Pierre | Parti Québécois |

== Linguistic demographics ==
- Francophone: 99.3%
- Anglophone: 0.5%
- Allophone: 0.2%

== Election results ==
2026 Quebec general election
** Preliminary results — Not yet official **
| Party | Candidate | Votes | % | ±% |
|---|---|---|---|---|
| Parti Québécois | Yohann St-Pierre | 14,189 | 43.35 | |
| Coalition Avenir Québec | Julia Brillant-Ruest | 5,796 | 17.71 | |
| Québec solidaire | Virginie Chevalier-Archambault | 4,923 | 15.04 | |
| Conservative | Cédric Gauthier | 4,322 | 13.21 | |
| Liberal | Michel Bienvenu | 3,095 | 9.46 | |
| Parti nul | Thomas Guay-Vachon | 212 | 0.65 | |
| Climat Québec | Gilles Gagné | 193 | 0.59 | |
| Total valid votes | | | | |
| Total rejected ballots | | | | |
| Turnout | | | 71.15 | |
| Electors on the lists | | | – | – |
| Parti Québécois gain from Coalition Avenir Québec | | Swing | | + |
Source: Élections Québec

2022 Quebec general election
| Party | Candidate | Votes | % | ±% |
|---|---|---|---|---|
| Coalition Avenir Québec | Maïté Blanchette Vézina | 13,761 | 41.75 | +16.86 |
| Parti Québécois | Samuel Ouellet | 9,440 | 28.64 | –15.28 |
| Québec solidaire | Carol-Ann Kack | 7,042 | 21.37 | +3.94 |
| Conservative | Stéphanie Du Mesnil | 1,566 | 4.75 | New |
| Liberal | Claude Laroche | 992 | 3.01 | –9.32 |
| Climat Québec | Pierre Beaudoin | 104 | 0.32 | New |
| Démocratie directe | Danielle Mélanie Gaudreau | 55 | 0.17 | New |
| Total valid votes | | 32,960 | 99.18 | |
| Total rejected ballots | | 274 | 0.82 | –0.06 |
| Turnout | | 33,234 | 71.60 | +1.35 |
| Electors on the lists | | 46,416 | | |
| Coalition Avenir Québec gain from Parti Québécois | | Swing | | +16.07 |
Source: Élections Québec

2018 Quebec general election
| Party | Candidate | Votes | % | ±% |
|---|---|---|---|---|
| Parti Québécois | Harold LeBel | 13,940 | 43.92 | +3.34 |
| Coalition Avenir Québec | Nancy Levesque | 7,903 | 24.90 | +14.15 |
| Québec solidaire | Carol-Ann Kack | 5,531 | 17.43 | +1.06 |
| Liberal | Claude Laroche | 3,914 | 12.33 | -17.66 |
| Green | Alexie Plourde | 220 | 0.69 | – |
| Independent | Denis Bélanger | 123 | 0.39 | – |
| Bloc Pot | Dany Levesque | 106 | 0.33 | -0.14 |
| Total valid votes | | 31,737 | 99.12 | |
| Total rejected ballots | | 282 | 0.88 | |
| Turnout | | 32,019 | 70.25 | +2.98 |
| Eligible voters | | 45,580 | | |
| Parti Québécois hold | | Swing | | -5.41 |
Source(s) "Rapport des résultats officiels du scrutin". Élections Québec.

2014 Quebec general election
| Party | Candidate | Votes | % | ±% |
|---|---|---|---|---|
| Parti Québécois | Harold LeBel | 12,028 | 40.58 | -7.77 |
| Liberal | Pierre Huot | 8,888 | 29.99 | +8.03 |
| Québec solidaire | Marie-Neige Besner | 4,851 | 16.37 | +9.08 |
| Coalition Avenir Québec | Steven Fleurent | 3,186 | 10.75 | -6.45 |
| Option nationale | Pierre Beaudoin | 327 | 1.10 | -1.65 |
| Parti nul | Pier-Luc Gagnon | 219 | 0.74 | +0.19 |
| Bloc Pot | Tom-Henri Cyr | 138 | 0.47 | – |
| Total valid votes | | 29,637 | 98.58 | – |
| Total rejected ballots | | 426 | 1.42 | – |
| Turnout | | 30,063 | 67.27 | -8.29 |
| Electors on the lists | | 44,687 | – | – |

2012 Quebec general election
| Party | Candidate | Votes | % | ±% |
|---|---|---|---|---|
| Parti Québécois | Irvin Pelletier | 15,979 | 48.35 | +0.09 |
| Liberal | Raymond Giguère | 7,258 | 21.96 | -13.37 |
| Coalition Avenir Québec | Jean-Paul Carrier | 5,684 | 17.20 | +4.42 |
| Québec solidaire | Rosalie Carrier-Cyr | 2,409 | 7.29 | +3.66 |
| Option nationale | Pierre Beaudoin | 910 | 2.75 | – |
| Green | Clement Pelletier | 630 | 1.91 | – |
| Parti nul | Renaud Blais | 182 | 0.55 | – |
| Total valid votes | | 33,052 | 99.25 | – |
| Total rejected ballots | | 251 | 0.75 | – |
| Turnout | | 33,303 | 75.56 | +13.48 |
| Electors on the lists | | 44,073 | – | – |

2008 Quebec general election
| Party | Candidate | Votes | % | ±% |
|---|---|---|---|---|
| Parti Québécois | Irvin Pelletier | 12,873 | 48.26 | |
| Liberal | Raymond Giguère | 9,424 | 35.33 | |
| Action démocratique | Frederic Audet | 3,410 | 12.78 | |
| Québec solidaire | Alain Thibault | 967 | 3.63 | |

2007 Quebec general election
| Party | Candidate | Votes | % | ±% |
|---|---|---|---|---|
| Parti Québécois | Irvin Pelletier | 12,925 | 40.58 | |
| Action démocratique | Roger Picard | 9,394 | 29.49 | |
| Liberal | Hélène Ménard | 6,988 | 21.94 | |
| Québec solidaire | Guylaine Bélanger | 1,894 | 5.95 | |
| Green | Stéphanie Théorêt | 651 | 2.04 | – |

2003 Quebec general election
| Party | Candidate | Votes | % | ±% |
|---|---|---|---|---|
| Parti Québécois | Solange Charest | 14,117 | 47.71 | |
| Liberal | Gaston Pelletier | 10,817 | 36.40 | |
| Action démocratique | Claude Fortin | 4,719 | 15.88 | |

1998 Quebec general election
| Party | Candidate | Votes | % |
|---|---|---|---|
| Parti Québécois | Solange Charest | 16,687 | 56.36 |
| Liberal | Chantal Landry | 9,617 | 32.48 |
| Action démocratique | Louis Maranda | 2,710 | 9.15 |
| Bloc Pot | Martin Poirier | 357 | 1.21 |
| Socialist Democracy | Manon Côté | 192 | 0.65 |
| Natural Law | Gilles Roussel | 43 | 0.15 |
| Total valid votes | | 29,606 | 99.16 |
| Total rejected ballots | | 251 | 0.84 |
| Turnout | | 29,857 | 75.43 |
| Electors on the lists | | 39,582 | – |

1995 Quebec referendum
| Side | Votes | % |
|---|---|---|
| Oui | 22,289 | 63.73 |
| Non | 12,684 | 36.27 |

1994 Quebec general election
| Party | Candidate | Votes | % |
|---|---|---|---|
| Parti Québécois | Solange Charest | 14,926 | 51.45 |
| Liberal | Michel Tremblay | 12,299 | 42.40 |
| New Democratic | Manon Côté | 1,556 | 5.36 |
| Natural Law | Patrice Beaulieu | 227 | 0.78 |
| Total valid votes | | 29,008 | 98.53 |
| Total rejected ballots | | 432 | 1.47 |
| Turnout | | 29,440 | 78.33 |
| Electors on the lists | | 37,584 | – |

1992 Charlottetown Accord referendum
| Side | Votes | % |
|---|---|---|
| Non | 22,616 | 68.58 |
| Oui | 10,363 | 31.42 |

1989 Quebec general election
| Party | Candidate | Votes | % |
|---|---|---|---|
| Liberal | Michel Tremblay | 16,019 | 56.29 |
| Parti Québécois | Jean-Yves Roy | 12,441 | 43.71 |
| Total valid votes | | 28,460 | 96.09 |
| Total rejected ballots | | 1,158 | 3.91 |
| Turnout | | 29,618 | 72.96 |
| Electors on the lists | | 40,596 | – |

1985 Quebec general election
| Party | Candidate | Votes | % |
|---|---|---|---|
| Liberal | Michel Tremblay | 15,116 | 48.78 |
| Parti Québécois | Alain Marcoux | 14,832 | 47.87 |
| Union Nationale | Réal Saint-Laurent | 853 | 2.75 |
| Christian Socialist | Sylvain Bernard | 185 | 0.60 |
| Total valid votes | | 30,986 | 98.23 |
| Total rejected ballots | | 557 | 1.77 |
| Turnout | | 31,543 | 75.06 |
| Electors on the lists | | 42,024 | – |

1981 Quebec general election
| Party | Candidate | Votes | % |
|---|---|---|---|
| Parti Québécois | Alain Marcoux | 20,106 | 61.04 |
| Liberal | Georges Fafard | 11,143 | 33.83 |
| Union Nationale | Maurice Bouillon | 1,525 | 4.63 |
| Workers' Communist | Régine Valois | 97 | 0.30 |
| Marxist–Leninist | Normand Fournier | 66 | 0.30 |
| Total valid votes | | 32,937 | 99.38 |
| Total rejected ballots | | 206 | 0.62 |
| Turnout | | 33,143 | 83.89 |
| Electors on the lists | | 39,507 | – |

1980 Quebec referendum
| Side | Votes | % |
|---|---|---|
| Oui | 16,799 | 53.15 |
| Non | 14,805 | 46.85 |

1976 Quebec general election
| Party | Candidate | Votes | % |
|---|---|---|---|
| Parti Québécois | Alain Marcoux | 15,232 | 53.04 |
| Liberal | Claude St-Hilaire | 10,086 | 35.12 |
| Union Nationale | Raynald Voyer | 1,664 | 5.79 |
| Ralliement créditiste | Alain Martel | 1,651 | 5.75 |
| Independent | Yvan Tronstad | 87 | 0.30 |
| Total valid votes | | 28,720 | 97.94 |
| Total rejected ballots | | 605 | 2.06 |
| Turnout | | 29,325 | 86.34 |
| Electors on the lists | | 33,963 | – |

1973 Quebec general election
| Party | Candidate | Votes | % |
|---|---|---|---|
| Liberal | Claude St-Hilaire | 13,268 | 50.92 |
| Parti Québécois | René Daigneault | 8,750 | 33.58 |
| Ralliement créditiste | Alcide Michaud | 3,307 | 12.69 |
| Union Nationale | Raynald Voyer | 730 | 2.80 |
| Total valid votes | | 26,055 | 98.21 |
| Total rejected ballots | | 475 | 1.79 |
| Turnout | | 26,530 | 82.19 |
| Electors on the lists | | 32,279 | – |

1970 Quebec general election
| Party | Candidate | Votes | % |
|---|---|---|---|
| Liberal | Maurice Tessier | 9,987 | 35.89 |
| Parti Québécois | André Fecteau | 8,427 | 30.28 |
| Union Nationale | Jean-Claude Lebel | 5,247 | 18.85 |
| Ralliement créditiste | Hervé Dickner | 4,169 | 14.98 |
| Total valid votes | | 27,829 | 98.77 |
| Total rejected ballots | | 347 | 1.23 |
| Turnout | | 28,176 | 85.67 |
| Electors on the lists | | 32,890 | – |

1966 Quebec general election
| Party | Candidate | Votes | % |
|---|---|---|---|
| Liberal | Maurice Tessier | 11,938 | 49.84 |
| Union Nationale | Aristide Girardin | 11,510 | 48.05 |
| RIN | Yves Dupré | 504 | 2.10 |
| Total valid votes | | 23,952 | 98.39 |
| Total rejected ballots | | 393 | 1.61 |
| Turnout | | 24,345 | 78.86 |
| Electors on the lists | | 30,872 | – |

1962 Quebec general election
| Party | Candidate | Votes | % |
|---|---|---|---|
| Liberal | Albert Dionne | 10,720 | 52.22 |
| Union Nationale | Gaétan Bérubé | 9,809 | 47.78 |
| Total valid votes | | 20,529 | 98.68 |
| Total rejected ballots | | 274 | 1.32 |
| Turnout | | 20,803 | 82.70 |
| Electors on the lists | | 25,154 | – |

1960 Quebec general election
| Party | Candidate | Votes | % |
|---|---|---|---|
| Liberal | Albert Dionne | 11,585 | 55.84 |
| Union Nationale | Roméo Crevier | 9,163 | 44.16 |
| Total valid votes | | 20,748 | 98.94 |
| Total rejected ballots | | 223 | 1.06 |
| Turnout | | 20,971 | 85.70 |
| Electors on the lists | | 24,469 | – |

1956 Quebec general election
| Party | Candidate | Votes | % |
|---|---|---|---|
| Liberal | Albert Dionne | 9,911 | 51.05 |
| Union Nationale | Émile Gagnon | 9,503 | 48.95 |
| Total valid votes | | 19,414 | 99.04 |
| Total rejected ballots | | 188 | 0.96 |
| Turnout | | 19,602 | 82.70 |
| Electors on the lists | | 23,052 | – |

1952 Quebec general election
| Party | Candidate | Votes | % |
|---|---|---|---|
| Union Nationale | Albert Dubé | 9,210 | 52.05 |
| Liberal | Charles-Alphonse Beaulieu | 8,229 | 46.50 |
| Independent | Ernest Boulanger | 256 | 1.45 |
| Total valid votes | | 17.695 | 98.93 |
| Total rejected ballots | | 191 | 1.07 |
| Turnout | | 17,886 | 83.69 |
| Electors on the lists | | 21,371 | – |

1948 Quebec general election
| Party | Candidate | Votes | % |
|---|---|---|---|
| Union Nationale | Albert Dubé | 7,819 | 44.81 |
| Liberal | Joseph-Thomas-Arthur Gendreau | 6,380 | 36.56 |
| Union des électeurs | Antoine Pelletier | 3,252 | 18.64 |
| Total valid votes | | 17,451 | 98.97 |
| Total rejected ballots | | 181 | 1.03 |
| Turnout | | 17,632 | 85.62 |
| Electors on the lists | | 20,594 | – |

1944 Quebec general election
| Party | Candidate | Votes | % |
|---|---|---|---|
| Union Nationale | Albert Dubé | 7,437 | 51.73 |
| Liberal | Maurice Tessier | 6,020 | 41.87 |
| Bloc populaire | Joseph T. Thériault | 920 | 6.40 |
| Total valid votes | | 14,377 | 99.28 |
| Total rejected ballots | | 104 | 0.72 |
| Turnout | | 14,481 | 79.93 |
| Electors on the lists | | 18,118 | – |

1939 Quebec general election
| Party | Candidate | Votes | % |
|---|---|---|---|
| Liberal | Louis-Joseph Moreault | 3,584 | 54.63 |
| Union Nationale | Albert Dubé | 2,894 | 44.11 |
| Action libérale nationale | Jean-Robert Deschênes | 83 | 1.27 |
| Total valid votes | | 6,561 | 99.51 |
| Total rejected ballots | | 32 | 0.49 |
| Turnout | | 6,593 | 83.28 |
| Electors on the lists | | 7,917 | – |

1936 Quebec general election
| Party | Candidate | Votes | % |
|---|---|---|---|
| Union Nationale | Alfred Dubé | 3,491 | 55.15 |
| Liberal | Louis-Joseph Moreault | 2,839 | 44.85 |
| Total valid votes | | 6,330 | 99.59 |
| Total rejected ballots | | 26 | 0.41 |
| Turnout | | 6,356 | 89.61 |
| Electors on the lists | | 7,093 | – |

1935 Quebec general election
| Party | Candidate | Votes | % |
|---|---|---|---|
| Liberal | Louis-Joseph Moreault | 3,055 | 53.49 |
| Action libérale nationale | Alfred Dubé | 2,656 | 46.51 |
| Total valid votes | | 5,711 | 99.76 |
| Total rejected ballots | | 14 | 0.24 |
| Turnout | | 5,725 | 79.54 |
| Electors on the lists | | 7,198 | – |

1931 Quebec general election
| Party | Candidate | Votes | % |
|---|---|---|---|
| Liberal | Louis-Joseph Moreault | 2,455 | 52.25 |
| Conservative | Joseph-Alphonse-Elzéar Côté | 2,244 | 47.75 |
| Total valid votes | | 4,699 | 99.72 |
| Total rejected ballots | | 13 | 0.28 |
| Turnout | | 4,712 | 87.80 |
| Electors on the lists | | 5,367 | – |

1927 Quebec general election
| Party | Candidate | Votes | % |
|---|---|---|---|
| Liberal | Louis-Joseph Moreault | 2,485 | 65.97 |
| Conservative | Elzéar-Auguste Côté | 1,282 | 34.03 |
| Total valid votes | | 3,767 | 99.42 |
| Total rejected ballots | | 22 | 0.58 |
| Turnout | | 3,789 | 76.36 |
| Electors on the lists | | 4,962 | – |

1923 Quebec general election
| Party | Candidate | Votes | % |
|---|---|---|---|
| Liberal | Louis-Joseph Moreault | 1,934 | 64.53 |
| Conservative | Pantaléon Morisette | 1,063 | 35.47 |
| Total valid votes | | 2,997 | 99.17 |
| Total rejected ballots | | 25 | 0.83 |
| Turnout | | 3,022 | 67.07 |
| Electors on the lists | | 4,506 | – |

1919 Quebec general election
| Party | Candidate | Votes | % |
|---|---|---|---|
| Liberal | Auguste-Maurice Tessier | Acclaimed | |
| Electors on the lists | | 4,160 | – |

1916 Quebec general election
| Party | Candidate | Votes | % |
|---|---|---|---|
| Liberal | Auguste-Maurice Tessier | Acclaimed | |
| Electors on the lists | | 4,118 | – |

1912 Quebec general election
| Party | Candidate | Votes | % |
|---|---|---|---|
| Liberal | Auguste-Maurice Tessier | 1,616 | 53.12 |
| Conservative | Elzéar Sasseville | 1,426 | 46.88 |
| Total valid votes | | 3,042 | 99.06 |
| Total rejected ballots | | 29 | 0.94 |
| Turnout | | 3,071 | 77.69 |
| Electors on the lists | | 3,953 | – |

1908 Quebec general election
| Party | Candidate | Votes | % |
|---|---|---|---|
| Liberal | Louis-Joseph Moreault | 1,812 | 71.00 |
| Conservative | Louis-Napoléon Asselin | 740 | 29.00 |
| Total valid votes | | 2,552 | 98.88 |
| Total rejected ballots | | 29 | 1.12 |
| Turnout | | 2,581 | 75.16 |
| Electors on the lists | | 3,434 | – |

Quebec provincial by-election, 1907
| Party | Candidate | Votes | % |
|---|---|---|---|
| Liberal | Pierre-Émile D'Anjou | 1,334 | 51.77 |
| Liberal | Henri-Romauld Fiset | 1,243 | 48.23 |
| Total valid votes | | 2,577 | 98.85 |
| Total rejected ballots | | 30 | 1.15 |
| Turnout | | 2,607 | 75.92 |
| Electors on the lists | | 3,434 | – |

Quebec provincial by-election, 1905
| Party | Candidate | Votes | % |
|---|---|---|---|
| Liberal | Auguste Tessier | Acclaimed | |
| Electors on the lists | | N.D | – |

1904 Quebec general election
| Party | Candidate | Votes | % |
|---|---|---|---|
| Liberal | Auguste Tessier | 1,418 | 69.24 |
| Conservative | Liguori Desjardins | 630 | 30.76 |
| Total valid votes | | 2,048 | 99.51 |
| Total rejected ballots | | 10 | 0.49 |
| Turnout | | 2,058 | 63.09 |
| Electors on the lists | | 3,262 | – |

1900 Quebec general election
| Party | Candidate | Votes | % |
|---|---|---|---|
| Liberal | Auguste-Maurice Tessier | Acclaimed | |
| Electors on the lists | | 2,968 | – |

1897 Quebec general election
| Party | Candidate | Votes | % |
|---|---|---|---|
| Liberal | Auguste Tessier | 1,202 | 55.57 |
| Conservative | Rodolphe-Alfred Drapeau | 961 | 44.43 |
| Total valid votes | | 2,163 | 98.32 |
| Total rejected ballots | | 37 | 1.68 |
| Turnout | | 2,200 | 81.06 |
| Electors on the lists | | 2,714 | – |

1892 Quebec general election
| Party | Candidate | Votes | % |
|---|---|---|---|
| Liberal | Auguste Tessier | 964 | 51.41 |
| Conservative | Louis Taché | 911 | 48.59 |
| Total valid votes | | 1,875 | 99.42 |
| Total rejected ballots | | 11 | 0.58 |
| Turnout | | 1,886 | 71.44 |
| Electors on the lists | | 2,640 | – |

1890 Quebec general election
| Party | Candidate | Votes | % |
|---|---|---|---|
| Liberal | Auguste Tessier | 1,096 | 62.20 |
| Conservative | Louis-Napoléon Côté | 666 | 37.80 |
| Total valid votes | | 1,762 | 99.16 |
| Total rejected ballots | | 15 | 0.84 |
| Turnout | | 1,777 | 66.06 |
| Electors on the lists | | 2,690 | – |

Quebec provincial by-election, 1889
| Party | Candidate | Votes | % |
|---|---|---|---|
| Liberal | Auguste Tessier | 1,786 | 52.44 |
| Conservative | Louis-Napoléon Asselin | 1,620 | 47.56 |
| Total valid votes | | 3,406 | 98.64 |
| Total rejected ballots | | 47 | 1.36 |
| Turnout | | 3,453 | 68.34 |
| Electors on the lists | | 5,053 | – |

1886 Quebec general election
| Party | Candidate | Votes | % |
|---|---|---|---|
| Liberal | Édouard-Onésiphore Martin | 1,729 | 50.90 |
| Conservative | Louis-Napoléon Asselin | 1,668 | 49.10 |
| Total valid votes | | 3,397 | 97.64 |
| Total rejected ballots | | 82 | 2.23 |
| Turnout | | 3,479 | 71.67 |
| Electors on the lists | | 4,854 | – |

Quebec provincial by-election, 1881
| Party | Candidate | Votes | % |
|---|---|---|---|
| Conservative | Louis-Napoléon Asselin | 1,463 | 51.26 |
| Liberal | Joseph Parent | 1,391 | 48.74 |
| Total valid votes | | 3,397 | 97.64 |
| Total rejected ballots | | 65 | 2.23 |
| Turnout | | 2,919 | 58.89 |
| Electors on the lists | | 4,957 | – |

Quebec provincial by-election, 1880
| Party | Candidate | Votes | % |
|---|---|---|---|
| Liberal | Joseph Parent | 959 | 45.09 |
| Conservative | Louis-Napoléon Asselin | 608 | 28.58 |
| Conservative | Louis-Napoléon Côté | 560 | 26.33 |
| Total valid votes | | 2,127 | 100.00 |
| Total rejected ballots | | 0 | 0.00 |
| Turnout | | 2,127 | 46.25 |
| Electors on the lists | | 4,599 | – |

Quebec provincial by-election, 1878
| Party | Candidate | Votes | % |
|---|---|---|---|
| Liberal | Alexandre Chauveau | 1,689 | 50.01 |
| Conservative | Roch-Pamphile Valleé | 1,688 | 49.99 |
| Total valid votes | | 3,377 | 100.00 |
| Total rejected ballots | | 0 | 0.00 |
| Turnout | | 3,377 | 79.65 |
| Electors on the lists | | 4,240 | – |

1875 Quebec general election
| Party | Candidate | Votes | % |
|---|---|---|---|
| Independent | Alexandre Chauveau | Acclaimed | |
| Electors on the lists | | 2,968 | – |

Quebec provincial by-election, 1872
| Party | Candidate | Votes | % |
|---|---|---|---|
| Conservative | Alexandre Chauveau | 941 | 54.14 |
| Independent | Jean-B. Romauld Fiset | 797 | 45.86 |
| Total valid votes | | 1,738 | 100.00 |
| Total rejected ballots | | 0 | 0.00 |
| Turnout | | 1,738 | 48.04 |
| Electors on the lists | | 3,618 | – |

1871 Quebec general election
| Party | Candidate | Votes | % |
|---|---|---|---|
| Conservative | Louis-Honoré Gosselin | 939 | 57.54 |
| Conservative | Joseph Magloire Hudon | 283 | 17.34 |
| Conservative | Désiré Bégin | 217 | 13.30 |
| Conservative | Joseph Garon | 193 | 11.83 |
| Total valid votes | | 1,632 | 100.00 |
| Total rejected ballots | | 0 | |
| Turnout | | 1,632 | 60.22 |
| Electors on the lists | | 3,522 | – |

1867 Quebec general election
| Party | Candidate | Votes | % |
|---|---|---|---|
| Conservative | Joseph Garon | 1,409 | 76.99 |
| Conservative | Désiré Bégin | 421 | 23.01 |
| Total valid votes | | 1,830 | 100.00 |
| Total rejected ballots | | 0 | |
| Turnout | | 1,830 | 60.22 |
| Electors on the lists | | 3,039 | – |

== See also ==
- List of Quebec provincial electoral districts
- Canadian provincial electoral districts
