= Irvin Pelletier =

Canadian politician and notary

MNA for Rimouski
- In office March 26, 2007 – April 7, 2014
- Preceded by: Solange Charest
- Succeeded by: Harold LeBel

Personal details
- Born: May 28, 1946 (age 79) Sayabec, Quebec
- Party: Parti Québécois
- Spouse: Michèle Grenier
- Profession: notary
- Portfolio: Financial Institutions

Irvin Pelletier (born May 28, 1946 in Sayabec, Quebec) is a Quebec politician and notary. He was the Member of National Assembly of Quebec for the riding of Rimouski for the Parti Québécois.

Pelletier went to Université Laval and received a bachelor's degree in pedagogy. He also attended the Université de Sherbrooke and obtained a master's degree in commercial sciences. He then became a notary for nearly 30 years and also a lecturer at Université du Québec à Rimouski where he was also an administration member. He was also involved in United Way campaign in the Bas-Saint-Laurent and the Rimouski Chamber of Commerce.

Pelletier was elected in 2007 in Rimouski, succeeding former PQ MNA Solange Charest. He was later named on April 25, 2007 the PQ critic in regional economic development and maritime affairs. After the departure of Rosaire Bertrand from politics, he was named the critic for financial institutions.

On April 11, 2008, Pelletier created controversy at a provincial Public Finance Committee when he suggested that Vincent Lacroix, who was involved in a major financial scandal in 2005 and serving a 12-year prison sentence for fraud, should return to business. He quickly withdrew his comments following vivid reactions from other politicians.
