= Georges Duhamel (politician) =

Canadian politician (1855–1892)

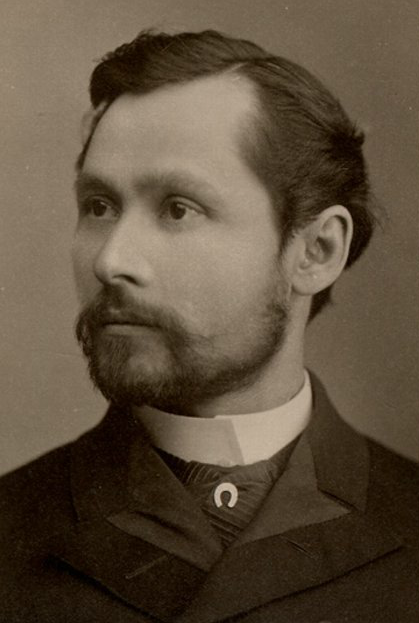

Member of the Legislative Assembly of Quebec for Iberville
- In office 1886–1890
- Preceded by: Alexis-Louis Demers
- Succeeded by: François Gosselin

Member of the Legislative Assembly of Quebec for La Prairie
- In office 1890–1892
- Preceded by: Odilon Goyette
- Succeeded by: Cyrille Doyon

Personal details
- Born: January 2, 1855 Belœil, Lower Canada
- Died: August 11, 1892 (aged 37) Montreal, Quebec
- Party: Liberal

Georges Duhamel (January 2, 1855 – August 11, 1892) was a lawyer and political figure in Quebec. He represented Iberville from 1886 to 1890 and La Prairie from 1890 to 1892 in the Legislative Assembly of Quebec as a Parti national member.

He was born in Beloeil, Canada East, the son of Toussaint Duhamel and Théotiste Ostilly, and was educated at the Collège Saint-Marie-de-Monnoir. Duhamel articled in law in Montreal, was called to the Quebec bar in 1879 and set up practice in Montreal with Joseph Adam. He was editor of the Le Courrier de Montréal from 1881 to 1883 and owner of the Le National from 1889 to 1892. He married Marie-Catherine-Cordélia Dugas in 1883. Duhamel helped organize a rally in support of Louis Riel held in Montreal in 1885 and was one of the principal organizers for the Parti national in the Montreal region. He ran unsuccessfully for a seat in the Quebec assembly in 1886. He was elected later that year in a by-election held following the death of Alexis-Louis Demers. He served in the provincial cabinet as solicitor general from 1887 to 1888 and as commissioner of crown lands from 1888 to 1891. Duhamel was defeated when he ran for reelection in 1892. He died in Montreal at the age of 37.
