= Ottawa (Quebec provincial electoral district) =

Quebec electoral district

Defunct provincial electoral district
- Legislature: National Assembly of Quebec
- District created: 1867
- District abolished: 1919
- First contested: 1867
- Last contested: 1917 (by-election)

Ottawa was the name of a former provincial electoral district in the Outaouais region of Quebec, Canada. It was located in the part of Quebec across the Ottawa River from the city of Ottawa, Ontario.

It was created for the 1867 election, and electoral districts of that name existed earlier in the Legislative Assembly of the Province of Canada (for Canada East) and in the Legislative Assembly of Lower Canada: see Ottawa (County of). Its final general election was in 1916, although there was a by-election in 1917. It disappeared in the 1919 election and its successor electoral districts were Hull and Papineau.

== Members of the Legislative Assembly ==
- Levi Ruggles Church, Conservative Party (1867–1871)
- Ezra Butler Eddy, Conservative Party (1871–1875)
- Louis Duhamel, Conservative Party (1875–1886)
- Narcisse-Édouard Cormier, Conservative Party (1886–1887)
- Alfred Rochon, Liberal (1887–1892)
- Nérée Tétreau, Conservative Party (1892–1897)
- Charles Beautron Major, Liberal (1897–1904)
- Ferdinand-Ambroise Gendron, Liberal (1904–1917)
- Joseph Caron, Liberal (1917–1919)
