= Shefford (provincial electoral district) =

Former provincial electoral district in Quebec, Canada

Coordinates: 45.37°N 72.63°W

Quebec electoral district

Defunct provincial electoral district
- Legislature: National Assembly of Quebec
- District created: 1867
- District abolished: 2011
- First contested: 1867
- Last contested: 2008

Demographics
- Electors (2008): 56,143
- Area (km²): 292.68
- Census division: La Haute-Yamaska (part)
- Census subdivision(s): Granby, Shefford, Warden, Waterloo

Shefford is a former provincial electoral district in the Montérégie region of Quebec, [Canada. As of its final election, it included the cities of Granby and Waterloo.

It was created for the 1867 election (and existed prior to that in the Legislative Assembly of the Province of Canada). Its final election was in 2008. It disappeared in the 2012 election. The western half became Granby, while most of the eastern portion joined Brome-Missisquoi.

== Members of the Legislative Assembly / National Assembly ==
- Michel-Adrien Bessette, Conservative Party (1867–1871)
- Maurice Laframboise, Liberal (1871–1878)
- Joseph Lafontaine, Liberal (1878–1881)
- Isidore Frégeau, Conservative Party (1881–1886)
- Thomas Brassard, Liberal (1886–1887)
- Tancrède Boucher de Grosbois, Liberal (1888–1892)
- Adolphe-François Savaria, Conservative Party (1892–1897)
- Tancrède Boucher de Grosbois, Liberal (1897–1903)
- Auguste Mathieu, Liberal (1904)
- Ludger-Pierre Bernard, Conservative Party (1904–1912)
- William Stephen Bullock, Liberal (1912–1931)
- Robert-Raoul Bachand, Liberal (1931–1935)
- Hector Choquette, Action liberale nationale - Union Nationale (1935–1939)
- Charles Munson Bullock, Liberal (1939–1944)
- Hector Choquette, Union Nationale (1944–1952)
- Gaston Ledoux, Liberal (1952–1956)
- Armand Russell, Union Nationale (1956–1973)
- Richard Verreault, Liberal (1973–1981)
- Roger Paré, Parti Québécois (1981–1994)
- Bernard Brodeur, Liberal (1994–2007)
- François Bonnardel, ADQ (2007–2012), CAQ (2012)

== Election results ==
2008 Quebec general election
Party	Candidate	Votes	%	±%
Action démocratique	François Bonnardel	11,271	34.63	
Liberal	Jean-Claude Tremblay	11,201	34.42	
Parti Québécois	Jean-François Arseneault	8,019	24.64	
Québec solidaire	Ginette Moreau	1,085	3.33	
Green	Martin Giard	789	2.42	–
Independent	Lucie Piédalue	181	0.56	

== See also ==
- List of Quebec provincial electoral districts
- Canadian provincial electoral districts
