= Léonise Valois =

Canadian poet and journalist

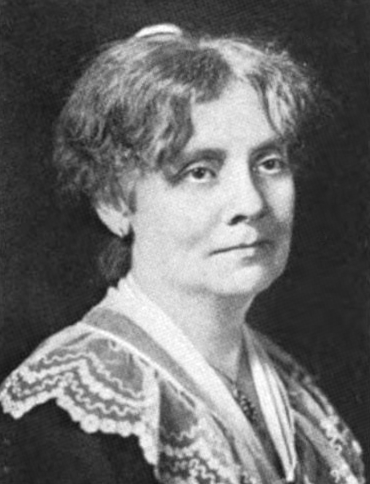
- Born: Marie-Attala-Amanda-Léonise Valois; October 11, 1868; Vaudreuil, Quebec, Canada
- Died: May 20, 1936 (aged 67); Montreal, Quebec, Canada
- Burial place: Vaudreuil Cemetery
- Other name: Atala
- Occupations: Poet, journalist

Léonise Valois (French pronunciation: [leɔniz valwa]; October 11, 1868 – May 20, 1936) was a Canadian poet and journalist. She was a pioneer in Canadian women's journalism and was the first French Canadian woman to publish a collection of poetry.

== Biography ==
The daughter of physician Louis-Joseph-Avila Valois and Marie-Louise Bourque, she was born Marie-Attala-Amanda-Léonise Valois in Vaudreuil, Quebec. She studied with the Sisters of Saint Anne in Vaudreui and then continued her studies at the convent of the Sisters of the Holy Names of Jesus and Mary in Beauharnois. After completing her education in 1883, Valois worked as bookkeeper for her father's medical practice and helping him with his patients. In 1886, the family moved to Sainte-Cunégonde. After her father's death in 1898, she worked at the registry office in Montreal to help support the family. Around the same time, she began working as a journalist for the women's pages in various newspapers in the Montreal area, including Le Monde illustré, La Presse, Le Journal de Françoise and Le Canada. In 1907, she began working for the post office in Montreal; she retired from the Post Office in 1929. In 1929, she became editor for the women's pages of La Terre de chez nous, the newsletter of the Union Catholique des Cultivateurs. She was forced to retire as editor in 1931 following a serious accident.

In 1889, Valois had several poems published in Le Recueil littéraire of Sainte-Cunégonde. Until 1910, she published under the name Atala. In 1910, she published Fleurs sauvages: poésies, the first poetry collection by a French Canadian woman. Valois published little during the following years except for a few articles in the Montreal periodicals L’Autorité nouvelle and La Revue moderne. In 1934, she published a second collection Feuilles tombées. In 1936, shortly before her death, she won the annual poetry competition held by the Société des Poètes Canadiens-Français.

Valois died at the Hôtel-Dieu de Montréal hospital on May 20, 1936, at the age of 67, and was buried at Vaudreuil Cemetery.
