= Ulric-Joseph Tessier =

Canadian politician and judge (1817–1892)

The Hon. Ulric-Joseph Tessier
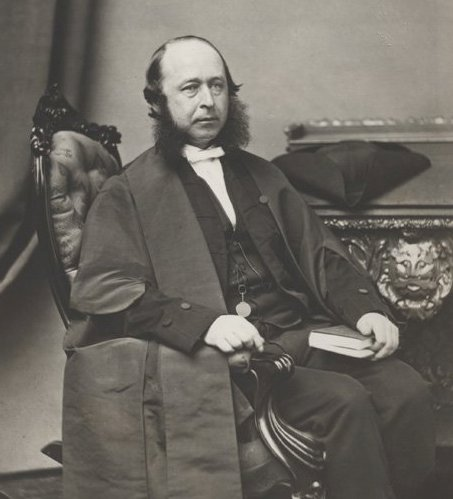

Senator for Gulf, Quebec
- In office October 23, 1867 – February 11, 1873
- Appointed by: Royal Proclamation
- Succeeded by: Eugène Chinic

Personal details
- Born: May 3, 1817 Quebec City, Lower Canada
- Died: April 7, 1892 (aged 74) Quebec City, Quebec
- Party: Liberal

Ulric-Joseph Tessier (May 3, 1817 – April 7, 1892) was a Quebec lawyer, judge, seigneur, and politician who was a member of the Senate of Canada representing the Gulf division from 1867 to 1873 and served as mayor of Quebec City from 1853 to 1854.

He was born Joseph-Ulric Tessier in Quebec City in 1817 and studied at the Petit Séminaire de Québec. He articled in law with Hector-Simon Huot and was admitted to the bar in 1839. Tessier was elected to city council in 1846. The following year, he married Marguerite-Adèle Kelly, heiress to the seigneury of Rimouski. In 1851, he was elected to the Legislative Assembly of the Province of Canada for Portneuf. He helped found the North Shore Railway in 1853 and, in 1858, the Banque Nationale, serving as its first president. He was part of a group that lobbied for Quebec City as the capital of Canada in London in 1857. Tessier was a professor in the faculty of law at the Université Laval. In 1858, he was elected to the Legislative Council for the Gulf division; he served as Minister of Public Works in the Executive Council from 1862 to 1863. Tessier was speaker for the Legislative Council from 1863 until Confederation, when he was appointed to the Senate. He was named Queen's Counsel in 1863. In 1869, his wife inherited the seigneury of Rimouski after the death of her mother; Tessier also purchased the seigneuries of Le Bic, Saint-Fabien, Saint-Simon, Saint-Mathieu, Trois-Pistoles and part of Île-d’Orléans. In 1873, Tessier resigned from the Senate to become a judge in the Quebec Superior Court in Quebec district; in 1875, he was named to the Court of Queen's Bench.

His published works included:

- Emma ou l’amour malheureux, a story based on the cholera epidemic at Quebec City that appeared in the city newspaper Le Télégraphe in 1837
- Essai sur le commerce et l'industrie du Bas-Canada, a study on the Quebec economy published in 1854

He died in Quebec City in 1892 and was buried in the Cimetière Notre-Dame-de-Belmont.

One son, Auguste, later served in the Quebec assembly and as a judge; another, Jules, served in the Quebec assembly and the Canadian Senate.
