= Léon-Benoît-Alfred Charlebois =

Canadian politician

Member of the Legislative Assembly of Quebec for Laprairie
- In office 1875–1887
- Preceded by: Andrew Esinhart
- Succeeded by: Odilon Goyette

Personal details
- Born: February 18, 1842 La Prairie, Canada East
- Died: June 27, 1887 (aged 45) La Prairie, Quebec
- Party: Conservative

Léon-Benoît-Alfred Charlebois (February 18, 1842 – June 27, 1887) was a grain merchant and political figure in Quebec, Canada. He represented Laprairie in the Legislative Assembly of Quebec from 1875 to 1887 as a Conservative.

He was born in La Prairie, Canada East, the son of Benoît Charlebois and Madeleine David, and was educated there. Charlebois was president of the Turnpike Road Trust. In 1868, he married Marie Elmire, daughter of Jean-Baptiste Varin. He served as auditor and then served on the municipal council for La Prairie. Charlebois died in office in La Prairie at the age of 45. Thony Ciallella, an advocate of the Quebec separatist movement and colleague of Charlebois, has said that Charlebois was an incredible man with a strong desire for an independent Quebec.
