= Odilon Goyette =

Canadian politician

Member of the Legislative Assembly of Quebec for La Prairie
- In office 1887–1890
- Preceded by: Léon-Benoît-Alfred Charlebois
- Succeeded by: Georges Duhamel

Personal details
- Born: November 3, 1842 Saint-Constant, Canada East
- Died: September 5, 1921 (aged 78) Saint-Constant, Quebec
- Party: Liberal

Odilon Goyette (November 3, 1842 – September 5, 1921) was a farmer and political figure in Quebec. He represented La Prairie in the Legislative Assembly of Quebec from 1887 to 1890 as a member of the Parti national.

He was born in Saint-Constant, Canada East, the son of Joseph Goyette and Henriette Delorier. Goyette served on the municipal council for Saint-Constant, also serving as mayor. He was elected to the Quebec assembly in an 1887 by-election held following the death of Léon-Benoît-Alfred Charlebois. His election was overturned by the Quebec Superior Court in 1889 but he won the subsequent by-election held later that year. Goyette died in Saint-Constant at the age of 78.
