= Nérée Tétreau =

Canadian politician

Member of the Legislative Assembly of Quebec from Ottawa
- In office 1892–1897
- Preceded by: Alfred Rochon
- Succeeded by: Charles Beautron Major

Personal details
- Born: April 12, 1842; Saint-Damase, Canada East, Canada
- Died: January 25, 1911 (aged 68); Hull, Quebec, Canada
- Political party: Conservative
- Spouse: Adèle Leduc (m. 1868)

Nérée Tétreau (April 12, 1842 – January 25, 1911) was a Canadian notary, land owner, and political figure in Quebec. He represented Ottawa electoral district in the Legislative Assembly of Quebec from 1892 to 1897 as a Conservative.

== Early life and education ==
Tétreau was born in Saint-Damase, Canada East, the son of Antoine Tétreau and Adélaïde Ayet, dit Malo. He was educated at the Séminaire de Saint-Hyacinthe and the Séminaire de Sainte-Marie-de-Monnoir.

== Career ==
Tétreau qualified to practise as a notary in 1866 and set up practice in Hull, Quebec. Tétreau was secretary-treasurer for the Hull school board from 1866 to 1868 and for the town of Hull from 1870 to 1875.

The Val-Tétreau neighbourhood and Val-Tétreau District of Gatineau were named in his honour.

== Personal life ==
In 1868, he married Adèle Leduc. He died in Hull at the age of 68.
