= Jules Tessier =

Canadian lawyer and politician

The Hon. Jules Tessier
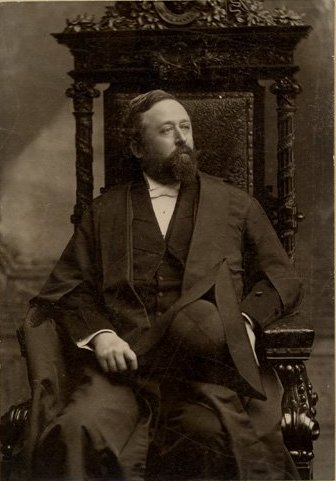

Senator for De la Durantaye, Quebec
- In office March 12, 1903 – January 6, 1934
- Appointed by: Wilfrid Laurier
- Preceded by: Alphonse Arthur Miville Déchêne
- Succeeded by: Émile Fortin

Member of the Legislative Assembly of Quebec for Portneuf
- In office 1886–1903
- Preceded by: Jean-Docile Brousseau
- Succeeded by: Damase-Éphipane Naud

Personal details
- Born: April 16, 1852 Quebec City, Quebec, Canada
- Died: January 6, 1934 (aged 81) Montreal, Quebec, Canada
- Party: Liberal
- Other political affiliations: Quebec Liberal Party
- Relations: Ulric-Joseph Tessier, father

Jules Tessier (French pronunciation: [ʒyl tɛsje]; April 16, 1852 – January 6, 1934) was a Canadian lawyer and politician.

He was born in Quebec City, Quebec, the son of Ulric-Joseph Tessier and Mariane Perrault. He was educated at the Quebec seminary and at the Jesuit college in Montreal, and was admitted to the Quebec Bar in 1874. He was created a Queen's Counsel in 1899. A practising lawyer, he ran unsuccessfully for Mayor of Quebec City in 1894. He was elected to the Legislative Assembly of Quebec in the riding of Portneuf in the 1886 election. A Liberal, he was re-elected in 1890, 1892, 1897, and acclaimed in 1900. From 1897 to 1901, he was Speaker of the Legislative Assembly. He resigned in 1903, when he was appointed to the Senate of Canada representing the senatorial division of De la Durantaye, Quebec. A Liberal, he died in office in 1934.

His brother, Auguste Tessier, was also a Member and Speaker of the Legislative Assembly as well as a Cabinet minister.

Political offices
Preceded by Pierre-Évariste Leblanc	Speaker of the Legislative Assembly of Quebec; 1897–1901	Succeeded by Henri-Benjamin Rainville
