= Narcisse-Édouard Cormier =

Canadian politician

Narcisse-Édouard Cormier (May 27, 1847 – February 18, 1906) was a merchant and political figure in Quebec. He represented Ottawa electoral district in the Legislative Assembly of Quebec from 1886 to 1887 as a Conservative.

He was born in Saint-Calixte-de-Somerset, Canada East, the son of Olivier Cormier and Emmérence Beaubien. Cormier lived in New Hampshire from 1861 until 1867, when he moved to Aylmer, Quebec and established himself there as a lumber merchant and grocer. Cormier owned a sawmill in Aylmer and a lumber yard in Petawawa, Ontario. He was chief fishing and game warden for west Quebec. He also founded a zoo in Aylmer. He was married twice: to Sophie-Agnès Bourgeau in 1869 and later to Mary Elizabeth Reilly. Cormier was president of the school board and of the local Saint-Jean-Baptiste Society. He served as mayor of Aylmer from 1884 to 1887 and was warden for Ottawa County in 1887. Cormier defeated Alfred Rochon in 1886 to win a seat in the Quebec assembly but the election was overturned and Rochon defeated Cormier in elections held in 1887 and 1890. Cormier died in Aylmer at the age of 58.
