= Alfred Rochon =

Canadian politician

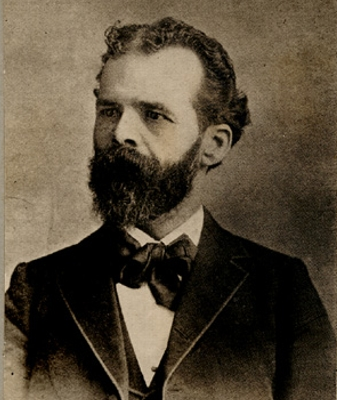

Member of the Legislative Assembly of Quebec for Ottawa
- In office 1887–1892
- Preceded by: Narcisse-Édouard Cormier
- Succeeded by: Nérée Tétreau

Personal details
- Born: February 1, 1847 Sainte-Thérèse-de-Blainville (Sainte-Thérèse), Lower Canada
- Died: November 17, 1909 (aged 62) Hull, Quebec

Alfred Rochon (February 1, 1847 – November 17, 1909) was a lawyer, judge and political figure in Quebec. He represented Ottawa electoral district in the Legislative Assembly of Quebec from 1887 to 1892 as a Liberal.

He was born in Sainte-Thérèse-de-Blainville, Canada East, the son of Élie Rochon and Sophie Ouimet, and was educated at the Petit Séminaire de Sainte-Thérèse. Rochon went on to study law in Montreal, was called to the Quebec bar in 1869 and set up practice in Montreal, setting in Hull in 1876. In 1872, he married Corinne Gaucher, the daughter of Guillaume Gamelin Gaucher. He served on the town council for Hull from 1877 to 1882 and from 1885 to 1889 and was mayor from 1886 to 1889. He was defeated by Narcisse-Édouard Cormier when he ran for a seat in the Quebec assembly in 1886 and, in 1887, was elected to the assembly after Cormier's election was overturned. Rochon resigned as mayor and alderman for Hull in 1889 to devote himself to his provincial duties. His election was successfully appealed in 1889 but he won the by-election that followed in 1890. He was defeated by Nérée Tétreau when he ran for reelection in 1892. Rochon was bâtonnier for the Ottawa County bar from 1893 to 1896. In 1901, he was named to the Quebec Superior Court for Ottawa District. Rochon died in Hull at the age of 62.
