= Louis Duhamel =

Canadian politician (1835–1915)

- Born: January 1, 1835
- Died: October 27, 1915 (aged 80)
- Education: Collège d'Ottawa; McGill University
- Occupations: Businessman; politician
- Spouse(s): Félonise Bel; Ézilda Mazurette

Louis Duhamel (January 1, 1835 – October 27, 1915) was a Canadian physician and political figure in Quebec. He represented Ottawa electoral district in the Legislative Assembly of Quebec from 1875 to 1886 as a Conservative member.

He was born Roch Duhamel in Verchères, Lower Canada, the son of François Duhamel and Josephte Audet, and was educated at the Collège d'Ottawa and McGill University, qualifying to practice as a doctor in 1860. Duhamel practised in Ottawa, Pembroke and in Wright County. He also owned a drug store in Hull. He was married twice: to Félonise Bel in 1862 and to Ézilda Mazurette dit Lapierre, the widow of Césaire Thérien, in 1901. Duhamel was registrar for Ottawa County from 1886 to 1915 and prothonotary at Hull from 1901 to 1915. He died in Hull at the age of 80.

In 1900, Duhamel had a residence built at 179 Promenade du Portage in Hull, in the Château style, featuring an irregular floor plan, a mansard roof, and a corner tower. The building survived the Great Fire of 1900 and served as Duhamel's residence and office; after his death it continued as a private residence until 1929, when it was converted into a hotel by Swiss-born chef Henri Burger and became known as Chez Henri. declared a historic monument by the city of Gatineau in 2003.
