= Thomas Brassard =

Canadian politician

Thomas Brassard (January 19, 1827 – September 19, 1887) was a notary and political figure in Quebec. He represented Shefford in the Legislative Assembly of Quebec from 1886 to 1887 as a Liberal.

He was born in La Malbaie, Lower Canada, the son of Joseph Brassard and Josephte Bouchard, and was educated at the Séminaire de Québec. Brassard qualified as a notary in 1855 and set up practice in Henryville, moving to Waterloo in 1863. In 1857, he married Aurélie-Élodie Sénécal. He was registrar for Brome County from 1879 to 1885 and commissioner for the trial of small causes at Henryville. He was secretary-treasurer for the school boards in Henryville and Waterloo, also serving as president of the latter. Brassard was also secretary-treasurer of the council for Shefford County. He died in office at the age of 60.
