= Louis-Honoré Gosselin =

Canadian politician

Louis-Honoré Gosselin (before 1851 – after 1880) was a merchant and political figure in Quebec. He represented Rimouski in the Legislative Assembly of Quebec from 1871 to 1872.

He was a merchant at Matane around 1863. From 1869 to 1875, Gosselin was in business at Petit-Matane. Gosselin was manager of the Mutual Fire Insurance Company in Rimouski, Témiscouata and Kamouraska counties and was a founding director for the La Rimouski Insurance Company. He was also involved in the cod fishery. Gosselin resigned his seat in the assembly in 1872. He became a forest ranger in 1875.
