= Michel Tremblay (politician) =

Canadian politician (born 1933)

Michel Tremblay (French pronunciation: [miʃɛl tʁɑ̃blɛ]; born March 28, 1933) is a Canadian retired politician from Quebec. A teacher by profession, he served in several education-related positions in the Bas-Saint-Laurent region before being elected to the National Assembly of Quebec as a Liberal in Rimouski in 1985. After being re-elected in 1989, he was defeated in 1994.

He served as mayor of Rimouski from 1994 to 2005. He ran unsuccessfully as a Liberal in Rimouski-Neigette—Témiscouata—Les Basques in the 2006 federal election.

In December 2006, Tremblay became chairman of the board of CJEM-FM in Edmundston, New Brunswick. He was born in Cap-à-l'Aigle, Quebec.
