= Édouard-Onésiphore Martin =

Canadian politician (1841–1889)

Édouard-Onésiphore Martin (September 6, 1841 – November 4, 1889) was a lumber merchant and political figure in Quebec. He represented Rimouski in the Legislative Assembly of Quebec from 1886 to 1889 as a Liberal.

He was born in Rimouski, Canada East, the son of Henry Martin and Marie-Louise Dessein, dit Saint-Pierre. Martin was educated at the Séminaire de Québec and at the Collège de Sainte-Anne-de-la-Pocatière. He owned sawmills at Métis and Lac Trois-Saumons. Martin was a contractor on the Intercolonial Railway from 1870 to 1874. He served in the militia reaching the rank of lieutenant-colonel. He died in office at Rimouski at the age of 48.

His brother Alphonse-Fortunat Martin served in the Manitoba legislative assembly.
