= Jean Dubuc (politician) =

Canadian politician and businessman (born 1941)

Jean Dubuc (born March 8, 1941) is a businessman and former Quebec politician. He represented La Prairie in the Quebec National Assembly from 2003 to 2007 as a Liberal.

Born in Saint-Isidore, Quebec, the son of Antonio Dubuc and Marie-Jeanne Bouchard, he was educated in Delson. Dubuc served on the municipal council for Delson from 1976 to 1980. He was defeated when he ran for reelection in 2007.
