= Honoré Mercier (disambiguation) =

Honoré Mercier may refer to:

- Honoré Mercier (1840–1894), a former premier of Quebec, Canada
  - Honoré Mercier Jr. (1875–1937), a member of the Legislative Assembly of Quebec, son of the above
    - Honoré Mercier III (1908–1988), a member of the Legislative Assembly of Quebec, son of the above
- Honoré Mercier Bridge, connecting the Island of Montreal to the south shore of the Saint Lawrence River
- Honoré-Mercier (electoral district), a federal electoral district in Quebec
