= Rémi Raymond =

- Born: Augustin-Rémi Raymond; December 5, 1811; Saint-Hyacinthe, Quebec
- Died: July 15, 1891 (aged 79)
- Education: Saint-Hyacinthe College
- Occupations: politician businessman
- Spouses: Emma Birs (m. 1870) Sophie Lapart (m. 1850) Héloïse Bouthillier (m. 1838)
- Parents: Joseph Raymond (father); Louise Cartier (mother)

Rémi Raymond (December 5, 1811 – July 15, 1891) was a businessman, farmer and political figure in Quebec. He represented St. Hyacinthe in the Legislative Assembly of the Province of Canada from 1863 to 1866.

He was born Augustin-Rémi Raymond in Saint-Hyacinthe, Quebec, the son of Joseph Raymond and Louise Cartier, and was educated at Saint-Hyacinthe college. Raymond was a founding director of the Banque de Saint-Hyacinthe and of the Compagnie d'imprimerie de Saint-Hyacinthe, which printed the Courrier de Saint-Hyacinthe. He was married three times: to Héloïse Bouthillier in 1838; to Sophie Lapart in 1850; and finally to Emma Birs in 1870. He was elected to the Legislative Assembly in an 1863 by-election held after Louis-Victor Sicotte was named a judge. Raymond ran unsuccessfully for a seat in the Canadian House of Commons in 1867. He died in Saint-Hyacinthe at the age of 79.

His sister Adèle married Augustin-Norbert Morin.

1867 Canadian federal election: St. Hyacinthe Bagot
| Party | Candidate | Votes |
|---|---|---|
| Liberal | Alexandre-Édouard Kierzkowski | 1,107 |
| Unknown | Rémi Raymond | 929 |
Source: Canadian Elections Database
