= René Morin =

Canadian politician

Louis-Simon-René Morin (July 27, 1883 – July 16, 1955) was head of the Canadian Broadcasting Corporation during World War II from 1940 to 1944, and was the first francophone and native-born Canadian to head the CBC.

Born in Saint-Hyacinthe, Quebec, Morin studied at McGill University. He subsequently worked as a notary, and was mayor of Saint-Hyacinthe from 1915 to 1917. He was elected as MP for St. Hyacinthe—Rouville in 1921, and served till 1930.

He later became head of the General Trust of Canada in 1927 and head of the Chambre des notaires du Québec from 1921 to 1924.

He joined Radio-Canada as vice-president from 1936 to 1940 and remained a member of the CBC board until 1955.

Parliament of Canada
Preceded by Louis-Joseph Gauthier	Member of Parliament for St. Hyacinthe—Rouville; 1921–1930	Succeeded by Joseph-Théophile-Adélard Fontaine
Media offices
Preceded by Leonard Brockington	President of the Canadian Broadcasting Corporation; 1940–1944	Succeeded by Howard B. Chase
