= Beauparlant =

Beauparlant is a surname. Notable people with the surname include:

- Aimé Majorique Beauparlant (1864–1911), Canadian politician
- André-Line Beauparlant (born 1966), Canadian art director, production designer, set decorator, and film director
