= Aimé Majorique Beauparlant =

Canadian politician (1864–1911)

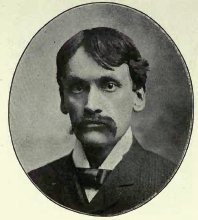

Member of the Canadian Parliament for St. Hyacinthe
- In office 1904–1911
- Preceded by: Jean Baptiste Blanchet
- Succeeded by: Louis-Joseph Gauthier

Personal details
- Born: January 4, 1864 St-Aimé, Canada East
- Died: August 19, 1911 (aged 47)
- Party: Liberal

Aimé Majorique Beauparlant (January 4, 1864 – August 19, 1911) was a Canadian politician.

Born in St-Aimé, Richelieu County, Canada East, Beauparlant was educated at the College of St-Aimé and St. Hyacinthe Seminary. He studied law under Honore Mercier and was the editor of L' Union, a weekly newspaper in St. Hyacinthe. He was first elected to the House of Commons of Canada for the electoral district of St. Hyacinthe in the general elections of 1904. A Liberal, he was re-elected in 1908. He died in 1911.

== Electoral record ==
1904 Canadian federal election: St. Hyacinthe
Party	Candidate	Votes
Liberal	Aimé Majorique Beauparlant	2,204
Conservative	Joseph de la Broquerie Taché	1,680

1908 Canadian federal election: St. Hyacinthe
Party	Candidate	Votes
Liberal	Aimé Majorique Beauparlant	2,325
Conservative	Antoine-Paul Cartier	1,768
