= Louis Delorme =

Canadian politician (1824–1895)

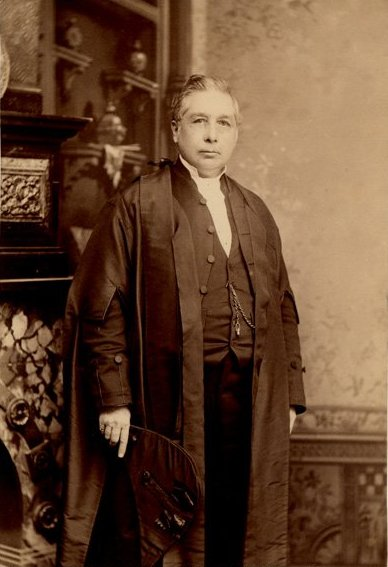

Member of the Canadian Parliament for St. Hyacinthe
- In office 1870–1878
- Preceded by: Alexandre-Édouard Kierzkowski
- Succeeded by: Louis Tellier

Personal details
- Born: 29 December 1824 Montreal, Lower Canada
- Died: 18 June 1895 (aged 70)
- Party: Liberal

Louis Delorme (French pronunciation: [lwi dəlɔʁm]; 29 December 1824 – 18 June 1895) was a Quebec lawyer and political figure. He represented St. Hyacinthe in the House of Commons of Canada as a Liberal member from 1870 to 1878.

== Early life ==
He was born in Montreal in 1824, the son of Pierre Delorme and Elizabeth Burke, and was educated at Saint Sulpice College and the college of St. Hyacinthe.

== Career and education ==
He studied law and was called to the bar in 1847. Delorme was first elected to the federal parliament in an 1870 by-election held after the death of Alexandre-Édouard Kierzkowski. He was mayor of St. Hyacinthe and warden for the county of St. Hyacinthe. Delorme also served as director for the Bank of St. Hyacinthe. He was named clerk for the Legislative Assembly of Quebec on 1 June 1879.

== Personal life ==
Delorme was married twice. He married Marie-Julie-Anna Fortier in 1855 and Flora-Sara-Adile Paradis in 1871.

== Death ==
He died in Montreal at the age of 70.

== Electoral record ==
By-election on 1 September 1870
Party	Candidate	Votes
Liberal	Louis Delorme	acclaimed

1872 Canadian federal election: St. Hyacinthe
Party	Candidate	Votes
Liberal	Louis Delorme	1,099
Unknown	Oscar Dunn	902
Source: Canadian Elections Database

1874 Canadian federal election: St. Hyacinthe
Party	Candidate	Votes
Liberal	Louis Delorme	acclaimed
Source: lop.parl.ca
