= Louis-Philippe Brodeur =

Canadian politician (1862–1924)

The Honourable Louis-Philippe Brodeur P.C., Q.C.
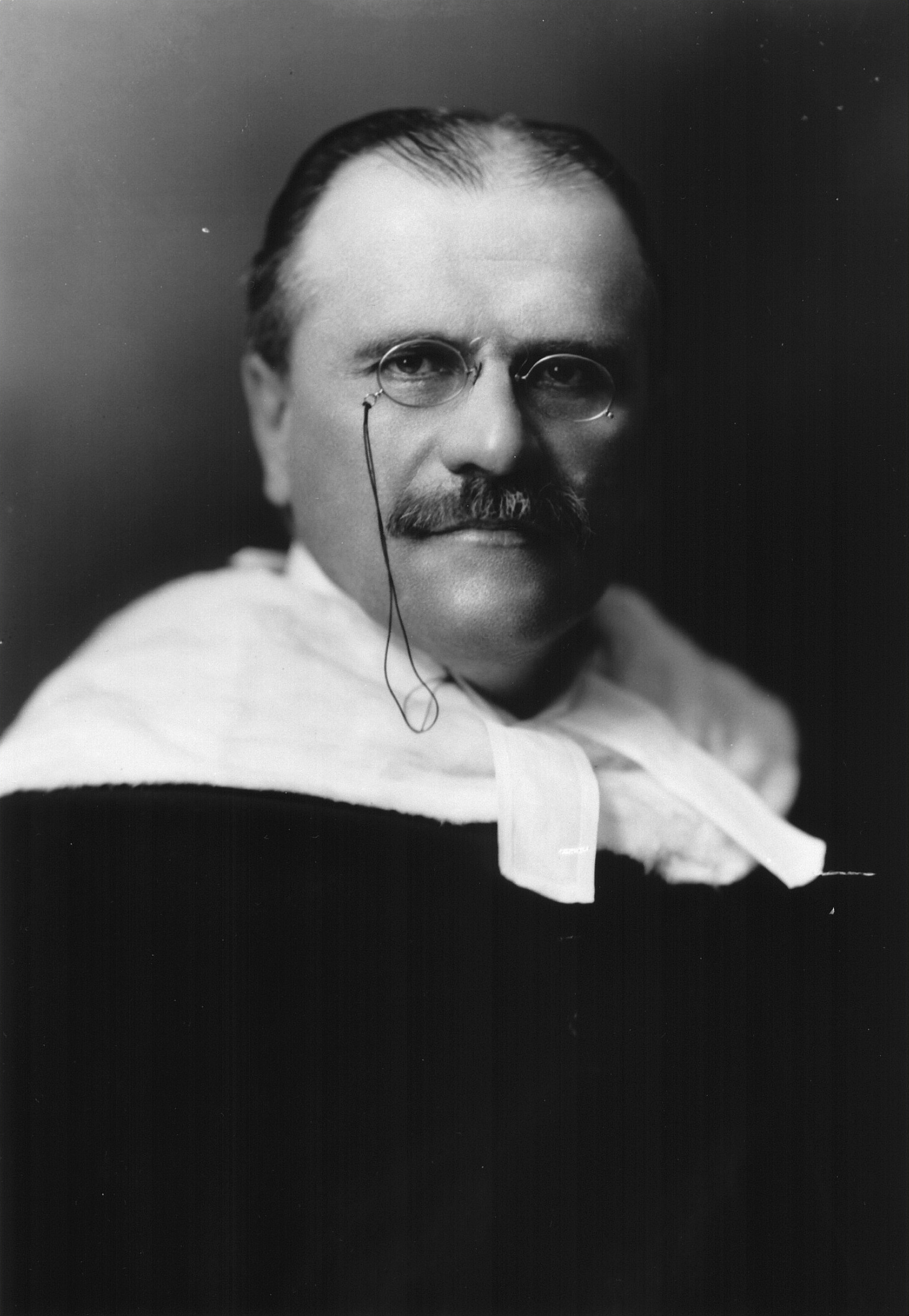

9th Speaker of the House of Commons of Canada
- In office 6 February 1901 – 18 January 1904
- Preceded by: Thomas Bain
- Succeeded by: Napoléon Antoine Belcourt

Member of the Canadian Parliament for Rouville
- In office 5 March 1891 – 21 September 1911
- Preceded by: George Auguste Gigault
- Succeeded by: Rodolphe Lemieux

Puisne Justice of the Supreme Court of Canada
- In office 11 August 1911 – 9 October 1923
- Nominated by: Sir Wilfrid Laurier
- Preceded by: Désiré Girouard
- Succeeded by: Arthur Cyrille Albert Malouin

13th Lieutenant Governor of Quebec
- In office 31 October 1923 – 2 January 1924
- Monarch: George V
- Governor General: The Viscount Byng of Vimy
- Premier: Louis-Alexandre Taschereau
- Preceded by: Charles Fitzpatrick
- Succeeded by: Narcisse Pérodeau

Personal details
- Born: 21 August 1862 Belœil, Canada East
- Died: 2 January 1924 (aged 61) Spencer Wood, Sillery
- Party: Liberal
- Spouse: Emma Brillon (m. 1887; Brodeur's death in 1924)
- Children: 5
- Education: Université Laval à Montréal
- Occupation: journalist, lawyer
- Profession: politician

Louis-Philippe Brodeur, PC QC baptised Louis-Joseph-Alexandre Brodeur (21 August 1862 – 2 January 1924) was a Canadian journalist, lawyer, politician and judge from Quebec. During his career he served as a federal Cabinet minister in the government of Wilfrid Laurier, Speaker of the House of Commons of Canada, and puisne justice of the Supreme Court of Canada.

== Early life ==
Born in Belœil, Quebec, he was first elected to the House of Commons of Canada in the 1891 election as Liberal Member of Parliament (MP) for Rouville, Quebec. He represented the riding continuously until his retirement prior to the 1911 election.

Brodeur was a firm supporter of Sir Wilfrid Laurier and came from a Rouges family. His father fought in the Lower Canada Rebellion of 1837, and his maternal grandfather was killed in the Rebellion's Battle of Saint-Charles.

== Legal and political career ==
As a young man, Brodeur studied law, graduating in 1884 with an LL.B. from the Université Laval in Montréal. He worked as a young lawyer with Honoré Mercier, before establishing his own law firm of Dandurand and Brodeuer with Raoul Dandurand. He also engaged in journalism for Liberal newspapers such as la Patrie and L'Électeur before becoming editor of Le Soir. He was first elected to the Canadian House of Commons at the age of 29. After the Liberals won the 1896 election, Brodeur was appointed deputy speaker. He was appointed as a Queen's Counsel in 1899. He became Speaker of the House of Commons of Canada following the 1900 election.

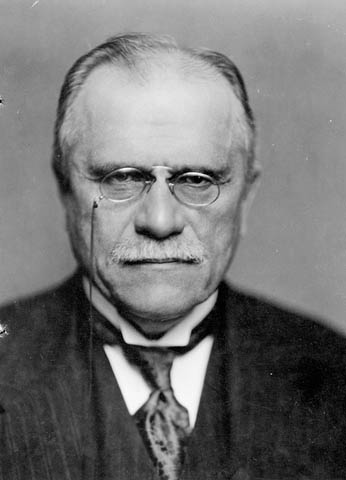
Brodeur c. 1923

In 1904, he was appointed to the Laurier Cabinet as Minister of Inland Revenue where he introduced antitrust legislation to protect tobacco farmers from the monopolistic practices of the American Tobacco Company.

In 1906, he was promoted to Minister of Marine and Fisheries and reorganized the Montreal Harbours Commission and instituted reforms in the department to reduce patronage and corruption.

Brodeur was a member of the Canadian delegation to the 1907 Imperial Conference in London, and also helped negotiate a trade treaty with France.

In 1910, he became Minister of the Naval Service and was responsible for introducing legislation to create the Canadian Navy. This signified a move towards Canadian independence from Britain. It was opposed by the Conservative Party, which preferred Canada's participation in the Royal Navy. By the end of his term, the new Navy consisted of 233 sailors and two cruisers, one on each coast. The policy of creating a Canadian Navy was also opposed by French-Canadian nationalists such as Henri Bourassa who feared that the Canadian Navy would only be used as a device to engage Canada in British wars.

Prior to the 1911 election, Brodeur retired from politics.

== Justice of the Supreme Court of Canada ==
On 11 August 1911, Prime Minister Laurier appointed Louis-Philippe Brodeur of Quebec to the Supreme Court of Canada after the death of Justice Désiré Girouard on 22 March. Brodeur was well liked and a close friend of Laurier, though described as having shown "no great skill in politics or law."

Historians Snell and Vaughan note that Laurier appointees like Brodeur, Louis Henry Davies, and Charles Fitzpatrick, who came from elected office, lacked the well-developed legal reasoning expected of judges and did not "make as useful a contribution to the law" as their more qualified colleagues.

On 9 October 1923, Brodeur resigned from the Court at age 61 due to poor health and arthritis that impaired his ability to write. Mackenzie King, who described Brodeur as "like a brother or a father," arranged for his appointment as the 13th Lieutenant Governor of Quebec, succeeding Charles Fitzpatrick.

Brodeur died on 2 January 1924, at the Lieutenant Governor's official residence of Spencer Wood in Sillery.

== Family ==
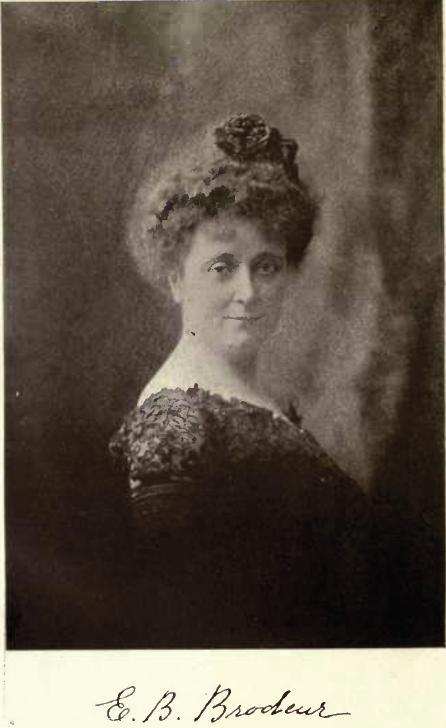
Madame Emma Brodeur c. 1900 by William James Topley

Louis-Philippe Brodeur married Emma Brillon, daughter of J. R. (Joseph-Régnier) Brillon, of Belœil, P.Q., in June 1887. Their son, Victor, attained the rank of Rear Admiral in the Royal Canadian Navy. The École Victor-Brodeur in Esquimalt, British Columbia, is named after him. Victor's son Nigel attained the rank of Vice Admiral.

== Archives ==
There are Louis-Philippe Brodeur fonds at Library and Archives Canada and Bibliothèque et Archives nationales du Québec.

== Electoral record ==
1891 Canadian federal election: Rouville
Party	Candidate	Votes
Liberal	Louis-Philippe Brodeur	1,289
Conservative	George-Auguste Gigault	1,220

1896 Canadian federal election: Rouville
Party	Candidate	Votes
Liberal	Louis-Philippe Brodeur	1,840
Conservative	J. A. Fournier	870

1900 Canadian federal election: Rouville
Party	Candidate	Votes
Liberal	Louis-Philippe Brodeur	1,767
Conservative	Joseph-Arthur David	682

By-election: On Mr. Brodeur being appointed Minister of Inland Revenue, 19 January 1904

By-election on 30 January 1904
Party	Candidate	Votes
Liberal	Louis-Philippe Brodeur	acclaimed

1904 Canadian federal election: Rouville
Party	Candidate	Votes
Liberal	Louis-Philippe Brodeur	1,671
Conservative	J. A. Nadeau	999

1908 Canadian federal election: Rouville
Party	Candidate	Votes
Liberal	Louis-Philippe Brodeur	acclaimed
