= St. Hyacinthe (electoral district) =

Former federal electoral district in Quebec, Canada

Coordinates: 45.65377°N 72.90476°W

Quebec electoral district

Defunct federal electoral district
- Legislature: House of Commons
- District created: 1867
- District abolished: 1914
- First contested: 1867
- Last contested: 1911

St. Hyacinthe (French: Saint-Hyacinthe) was a federal electoral district in Quebec, Canada, that was represented in the House of Commons of Canada from 1867 to 1917.

It was created by the British North America Act, 1867. The electoral district was abolished in 1914 when it was merged into St. Hyacinthe—Rouville riding.

== Members of Parliament ==
This riding elected the following members of Parliament:

Parliament	Years	Member	Party
St. Hyacinthe
1st	1867–1870	Alexandre-Édouard Kierzkowski	Liberal
1st	1870–1872	Louis Delorme	Liberal
2nd	1872–1874	Louis Delorme	Liberal
3rd	1874–1878	Louis Delorme	Liberal
4th	1878–1882	Louis Tellier	Conservative
5th	1882–1887	Michel-Esdras Bernier	Liberal
6th	1887–1891	Michel-Esdras Bernier	Liberal
7th	1891–1896	Michel-Esdras Bernier	Liberal
8th	1896–1900	Michel-Esdras Bernier	Liberal
8th	1900–1900	Michel-Esdras Bernier	Liberal
9th	1900–1904	Michel-Esdras Bernier	Liberal
9th	1904–1904	Jean-Baptiste Blanchet	Liberal
10th	1904–1908	Aimé Majorique Beauparlant	Liberal
11th	1908–1911	Aimé Majorique Beauparlant	Liberal
12th	1911–1917	Louis-Joseph Gauthier	Liberal
Riding dissolved into St. Hyacinthe—Rouville

== Election results ==
1867 Canadian federal election
Party	Candidate	Votes
Liberal	Alexandre-Édouard Kierzkowski	1,107
Unknown	Rémi Raymond	929
Source: Canadian Elections Database

By-election: On Mr. Kierzkowski's death, 4 August 1870

By-election on 1 September 1870
Party	Candidate	Votes
Liberal	Louis Delorme	acclaimed

1872 Canadian federal election
Party	Candidate	Votes
Liberal	Louis Delorme	1,099
Unknown	Oscar Dunn	902
Source: Canadian Elections Database

1874 Canadian federal election
Party	Candidate	Votes
Liberal	Louis Delorme	acclaimed
Source: lop.parl.ca

1878 Canadian federal election
Party	Candidate	Votes
Conservative	Louis Tellier	1,181
Liberal	Honoré Mercier	1,175

1882 Canadian federal election
Party	Candidate	Votes
Liberal	Michel-Esdras Bernier	1,336
Conservative	Louis Tellier	1,202

1887 Canadian federal election
Party	Candidate	Votes
Liberal	Michel-Esdras Bernier	1,489
Conservative	Adolphe Durocher	314

1891 Canadian federal election
Party	Candidate	Votes
Liberal	Michel-Esdras Bernier	1,671
Conservative	Eusèbe Brodeur	1,175

1896 Canadian federal election
Party	Candidate	Votes
Liberal	Michel-Esdras Bernier	acclaimed

By-election: On Mr. Bernier being appointed Controller of Inland Revenue, 22 June 1900

By-election on 4 July 1900
Party	Candidate	Votes
Liberal	Michel-Esdras Bernier	acclaimed

1900 Canadian federal election
Party	Candidate	Votes
Liberal	Michel-Esdras Bernier	2,247
Conservative	A. P. Cartier	1,136

By-election: On Mr. Bernier being appointed Railway Commissioner, 19 January 1904

By-election on 16 February 1904
Party	Candidate	Votes
Liberal	Jean-Baptiste Blanchet	1,841
Conservative	J. de L. Taché	1,645

1904 Canadian federal election
Party	Candidate	Votes
Liberal	Aimé Majorique Beauparlant	2,204
Conservative	Joseph de la Broquerie Taché	1,680

1908 Canadian federal election
Party	Candidate	Votes
Liberal	Aimé Majorique Beauparlant	2,325
Conservative	Antoine-Paul Cartier	1,768

1911 Canadian federal election
Party	Candidate	Votes
Liberal	Louis-Joseph Gauthier	2,295
Conservative	Ernest Guimont	2,155

== See also ==
- List of Canadian electoral districts
- Historical federal electoral districts of Canada
