= Alexandre-Édouard Kierzkowski =

Canadian politician

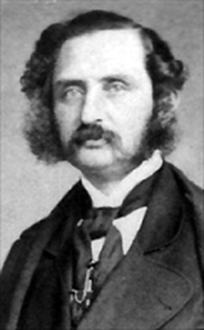
Image of Aleksander Edward Kierzkowski

Alexandre-Édouard Kierzkowski (November 21, 1816 – August 4, 1870) was a civil engineer and political figure in Canada East.

== Life ==
He was born as Aleksander Edward Kierzkowski in the Grand Duchy of Poznań (now in Poland) and joined the Polish Army as an officer in an unsuccessful campaign against the Russians in 1830 to 1831. He was the son of the Jakub Filip Kierzkowski polish nobleman and officer and Marianna Garnysz. He moved to France and received a diploma as a civil engineer in Paris. In 1839 he invented the shower cabin. He arrived in Canada in 1842. In 1845, he married Louise-Amélie Debartzch, daughter of Pierre-Dominique Debartzch, and, by marriage, became seigneur of parts of Saint-François-le-Neuf, Cournoyer, Debartzch, and L'Assomption. He became justice of the peace and was appointed major in the Richilieu militia in 1855.

In 1858, he was elected to the Legislative Council for the Montarville division, but he was disqualified in 1861 because the value of the property that he owned was not judged to be adequate. In 1861, he was elected to the 7th Parliament of the Province of Canada representing Verchères; his election was declared invalid in 1863. In 1868, after the death of his first wife, he married Caroline-Virginie, his wife's cousin and the daughter of François-Roch de Saint-Ours. In 1867, he was elected to the House of Commons of Canada representing St. Hyacinthe; he died while still in office at Saint-Ours, Quebec in 1870. He is believed to have returned from a trip to his native country with some Polish soil that was later buried with him.

== Electoral record ==
1867 Canadian federal election: St. Hyacinthe Bagot
Party	Candidate	Votes
Liberal	Alexandre-Édouard Kierzkowski	1,107
Unknown	Rémi Raymond	929
Source: Canadian Elections Database

Parliament of Canada
Preceded by None	Member of Parliament from St. Hyacinthe; 1867–1870	Succeeded by Louis Delorme
