= Davidson Dunton =

- Born: Arnold Davidson Dunton; July 4, 1912; Montreal, Quebec
- Died: February 7, 1987 (aged 74); Ottawa, Ontario
- Known for: First chairman of the Canadian Broadcasting Corporation (CBC).
- Awards: Order of Canada

Arnold Davidson Dunton, CC (July 4, 1912 – February 7, 1987) was a Canadian educator and public administrator, from 1943 to 1958 chairman of the Canadian Broadcasting Corporation.

== Early life and career ==
He was educated at the High School of Montreal and Lower Canada College, Montréal, completing his secondary education at the age of fifteen. Too young to attend a Canadian university, for four years he travelled and attended courses in France, Britain, and Germany. On his return, he worked as a reporter on the Montreal Star. He was the paper's associate editor, 1937–38, and was editor of its sister paper the Montréal Saturday Standard in 1938. He joined the Wartime Information Board in 1942 and was general manager 1944-45. In late 1945, at age 33, he was appointed the first full-time chairman of the Canadian Broadcasting Corporation (CBC).

Throughout the controversies that arose over the funding and regulation of the new medium of television, Dunton was a persuasive defender of the corporation's independence and a strong advocate of the need to fund publicly a television system. Shortly after the CBC completed its network from coast to coast in July 1958, he resigned and became president of Carleton University. His post as CBC chairman was replaced by Alphonse Ouimet. Dunton was widely commended for the tact and intelligence with which he had overseen the development of CBC television. Marc Thibault who directed the News and Public Affairs (1968-1981) at Société Radio-Canada (CBC French Network), built on Davidson Dunton's vision to bring qualitative and quantitative rigour (formative and summative evaluation) in assessing coast-to-coast equity and content impartiality, especially during federal and provincial elections.

He was appointed by Prime Minister Lester Pearson co-chairman, (with André Laurendeau), of the Royal Commission on Bilingualism and Biculturalism in 1963, which has profoundly influenced federal government language policies. He stepped down as Carleton's president in 1972 to become director of the Institute of Canadian Studies at Carleton (1973–78) and later fellow of the Institute. He was invested as a Companion of the Order of Canada and received honorary diplomas from seven Canadian universities. The Dunton Tower at Carleton University is named in his honour.

== Honours ==
- 1954 - honorary degree of Doctor of Laws from the University of Saskatchewan.
- 1959 - honorary degree of Doctor of Laws from the University of British Columbia.
- 1970 - he was invested as a Companion of the Order of Canada.
- 1977 - honorary degree of Doctor of Laws from the University of New Brunswick.

Preceded by Howard B. Chase	President of the Canadian Broadcasting Corporation; 1945–1957	Succeeded by Alphonse Ouimet
