= Marie-Belle Gendron =

Canadian politician

Member of the National Assembly of Quebec for Châteauguay
- In office October 3, 2022 – August 27, 2026
- Preceded by: MarieChantal Chassé
- Succeeded by: Félix Rhéaume

Personal details
- Born: 1981 Châteauguay, Quebec
- Party: Coalition Avenir Québec

Marie-Belle Gendron is a Canadian politician, who was elected to the National Assembly of Quebec in the 2022 Quebec general election. She represented the riding of Châteauguay as a member of the Coalition Avenir Québec.

== Electoral record ==
2026 Quebec general election: Châteauguay
** Preliminary results — Not yet official **
Party	Candidate	Votes	%	±%
Liberal	Félix Rhéaume	12,343	35.76	+10.98
Parti Québécois	Yannick Trudeau	9,651	27.96	+16.12
Coalition Avenir Québec	Marie-Belle Gendron	4,663	13.51	–25.61
Conservative	Mohsen Eshtiaghi	4,251	12.32	+2.23
Québec solidaire	Marianne Pharand-Roy	3,037	8.80	–3.98
Green	José Bro	329	0.95	–0.44
Canadian	Hannah Wolker	240	0.70	N/A
Total valid votes		34,514	98.36	–0.38
Total rejected ballots		575	1.64	+0.38
Turnout		35,089	61.46	–0.52
Electors on the lists		57,091		
Liberal gain from Coalition Avenir Québec		Swing		–2.57
Source: Élections Québec

2022 Quebec general election: Châteauguay
Party	Candidate	Votes	%	±%
Coalition Avenir Québec	Marie-Belle Gendron	13,038	39.12	+2.06
Liberal	Jean-François Primeau	8,260	24.78	-8.89
Québec solidaire	Martin Bécotte	4,261	12.78	-0.03
Parti Québécois	Marianne Lafleur	3,947	11.84	-0.42
Conservative	Patric Viau	3,363	10.09	+8.71
Green	Stephanie Stevenson	463	1.39	-0.5
Total valid votes		33,332	98.74	
Total rejected ballots		425	1.26	
Turnout		33,757	61.98	-1.88
Electors on the lists		54,467		
