= Michel-Esdras Bernier =

Canadian politician (1841–1921)

The Honourable Michel Esdras Bernier PC
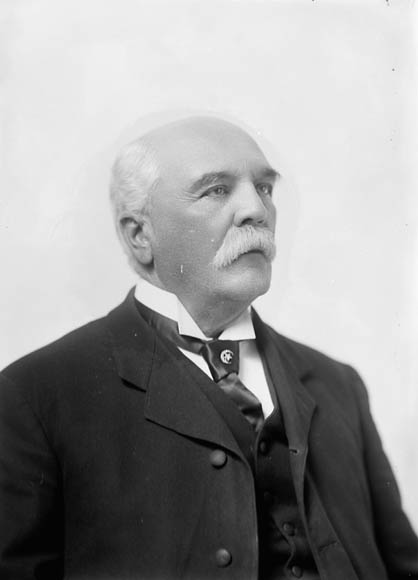
- Michel Esdras Bernier, October 1910

Member of the Canadian Parliament for St. Hyacinthe
- In office 1882–1904
- Preceded by: Louis Tellier
- Succeeded by: Jean Baptiste Blanchet

Personal details
- Born: September 28, 1841 St-Hyacinthe, Canada East
- Died: July 27, 1921 (aged 79)
- Party: Liberal
- Cabinet: Minister of Inland Revenue (1900–1904)

Michel Esdras Bernier, PC (September 28, 1841 – July 27, 1921) was a Canadian politician.

Born in St-Hyacinthe, Canada East, he was a notary and businessman before being elected to the House of Commons of Canada for the riding of St. Hyacinthe in 1882. A Liberal, he was re-elected in 1887, 1891, 1896, and 1900. From 1900 to 1904, he was the Minister of Inland Revenue. From 1904 to 1914, he was the Deputy Commissioner of the Board of Railway Commissioners and Transport Commissioners.

== Electoral record ==
1882 Canadian federal election: St. Hyacinthe
| Party | Candidate | Votes |
|---|---|---|
| Liberal | Michel-Esdras Bernier | 1,336 |
| Conservative | Louis Tellier | 1,202 |

1887 Canadian federal election: St. Hyacinthe
| Party | Candidate | Votes |
|---|---|---|
| Liberal | Michel-Esdras Bernier | 1,489 |
| Conservative | Adolphe Durocher | 314 |

1891 Canadian federal election: St. Hyacinthe
| Party | Candidate | Votes |
|---|---|---|
| Liberal | Michel-Esdras Bernier | 1,671 |
| Conservative | Eusèbe Brodeur | 1,175 |

1896 Canadian federal election: St. Hyacinthe
| Party | Candidate | Votes |
|---|---|---|
| Liberal | Michel-Esdras Bernier | acclaimed |

By-election: On Mr. Bernier being appointed Controller of Inland Revenue, 22 June 1900

By-election on 4 July 1900
| Party | Candidate | Votes |
| Liberal | Michel-Esdras Bernier | acclaimed |

1900 Canadian federal election: St. Hyacinthe
| Party | Candidate | Votes |
|---|---|---|
| Liberal | Michel-Esdras Bernier | 2,247 |
| Conservative | A. P. Cartier | 1,136 |
