= George-Auguste Gigault =

Canadian politician

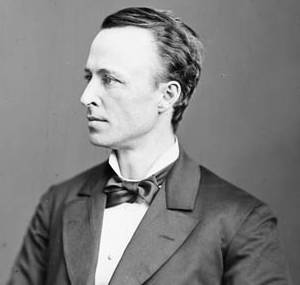
George-Auguste Gigault Source: Library and Archives Canada

George-Auguste Gigault (November 23, 1845 – April 25, 1915) was a notary, civil servant and political figure in Quebec. He represented Rouville in the House of Commons of Canada from 1878 to 1891 as a Conservative and then independent Conservative member. His first name also appears as Georges-Auguste.

He was born in Saint-Mathias, Canada East, the son of Pierre Gigault and Marguerite Wait, and was educated at the Séminaire de Saint-Hyacinthe. Gigault went on to study law in Montreal and was licensed to practise as a notary in 1867. He practised in Saint-Césaire and later in Sainte-Foy. In 1870, he married Isabella Dillon. Gigault was an unsuccessful candidate for a seat in the House of Commons in 1874. He served as mayor of St-Césaire from 1875 to 1878. He also served as postmaster. Opposed to the execution of Louis Riel, he declared himself a Nationalist Conservative in 1885 and ran as an independent Conservative in 1887. Gigault was defeated when he ran for reelection in 1891. In 1892, he was an unsuccessful candidate for the Rouville seat in the Quebec legislative assembly. Later that year, he was named assistant commissioner in the Quebec Department of Agriculture and Colonization. In 1897, after the department was split, he became assistant commissioner in the Department of Agriculture. He died on his farm in Sainte-Foy at the age of 69.

== Electoral record ==
1874 Canadian federal election: Rouville
Party	Candidate	Votes
Liberal	Guillaume Cheval dit St-Jacques	812
Conservative	George-Auguste Gigault	73

1878 Canadian federal election: Rouville
Party	Candidate	Votes
Conservative	George-Auguste Gigault	1,073
Liberal	Guillaume Cheval dit St-Jacques	1,038

1882 Canadian federal election: Rouville
Party	Candidate	Votes
Conservative	George-Auguste Gigault	1,199
Unknown	Ed. Lareau	1,045

1887 Canadian federal election: Rouville
Party	Candidate	Votes
Conservative	George-Auguste Gigault	acclaimed

1891 Canadian federal election: Rouville
Party	Candidate	Votes
Liberal	Louis-Philippe Brodeur	1,289
Conservative	George-Auguste Gigault	1,220
