= Guillaume Cheval dit St-Jacques =

Canadian politician

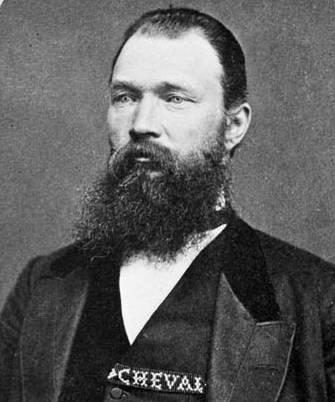
Guillaume Cheval Source: Library and Archives Canada

Guillaume Cheval dit St-Jacques (April 17, 1828 – April 29, 1880) was a Quebec businessman and political figure. He represented Rouville in the House of Commons of Canada as a Liberal member from 1867 to 1872 and from 1874 to 1878.

He was born in Beloeil, Lower Canada in 1828, the son of Louis Cheval dit St-Jacques and Rosalie Cherrier (cousin of Louis-Joseph Papineau) and educated at Saint-Denis. He served as mayor of Saint-Hilaire for four years. In 1852, he married Hermélimbe Richer. He died in Saint-Hilaire at the age of 52.

== Electoral record ==
1867 Canadian federal election: Rouville
| Party | Candidate | Votes |
|---|---|---|
| Liberal | Guillaume Cheval dit St-Jacques | 1,236 |
| Unknown | Joseph-Napoléon Poulin | 824 |
Source: Canadian Elections Database

1872 Canadian federal election: Rouville
| Party | Candidate | Votes |
|---|---|---|
| Liberal | Honoré Mercier | 1,033 |
| Liberal | Guillaume Cheval, Alias Saint-Jacques | 977 |
Source: Canadian Elections Database

1874 Canadian federal election: Rouville
| Party | Candidate | Votes |
|---|---|---|
| Liberal | Guillaume Cheval dit St-Jacques | 812 |
| Conservative | George-Auguste Gigault | 73 |

1878 Canadian federal election: Rouville
| Party | Candidate | Votes |
|---|---|---|
| Conservative | George-Auguste Gigault | 1,073 |
| Liberal | Guillaume Cheval dit St-Jacques | 1,038 |

Parliament of Canada
| Preceded by None | Member of Parliament for Rouville; 1867–1872 | Succeeded by Honoré Mercier |
| Preceded by Honoré Mercier | Member of Parliament for Rouville; 1874–1878 | Succeeded by George Auguste Gigault |
