= Adélard Fontaine =

Canadian politician (1892–1967)

Member of Parliament for St. Hyacinthe—Rouville
- In office July 1930 – October 1935
- Preceded by: René Morin
- Succeeded by: riding dissolved

Member of Parliament for Saint-Hyacinthe—Bagot
- In office October 1935 – July 1944
- Preceded by: riding created
- Succeeded by: Joseph Fontaine

Personal details
- Born: Joseph-Théophile-Adélard Fontaine; 30 November 1892 Saint-Thomas-d'Aquin, Quebec
- Died: 21 November 1967 (aged 74)
- Party: Liberal
- Spouse: Alice Leclair (m. 1923)
- Profession: Lawyer

Joseph-Théophile-Adélard Fontaine (30 November 1892 – 21 November 1967) was a Canadian lawyer and politician. Fontaine was a Liberal party member of the House of Commons of Canada. He was born in Saint-Thomas-d'Aquin, Quebec and became a lawyer by career.

Fontaine attended seminary at Saint-Hyacinthe then Université Laval and attained B.A. and LL.L degrees. On 8 May 1923 he married Alice Leclair. In 1929, he was appointed King's Counsel.

He was first elected to Parliament at the St. Hyacinthe—Rouville riding in the 1930 general election then re-elected there in 1935 and 1940. Fontaine resigned on 27 July 1944 before completing his term in the 19th Canadian Parliament.

Named in 1944 as judge to the Court of Sessions of the Peace (now the Criminal and Penal Division of the Court of Quebec), he died on 21 November 1967, after 23 years on the bench.
