= Roland Dussault =

Canadian politician

Roland Dussault was a politician in Quebec, Canada.

== Background ==
He was born on November 15, 1940, in Breakeyville and made career in education. Before he ran for office, Dussault was a Rassemblement pour l'indépendance nationale activist.

== Political career ==
Dussault unsuccessfully ran as a Parti Québécois candidate to the National Assembly of Quebec in the district of Châteauguay in the 1973 election. He was elected in the 1976 and was re-elected in 1981 elections.

He served as his party's Deputy House Whip from 1979 to 1981 and as parliamentary assistant from 1981 to 1985.

Dussault was defeated in the 1985 election.

== Retirement ==
After his retirement from public office, Dussault joined the Raëlian Movement.

== Footnotes ==
National Assembly of Quebec
Preceded by George Kennedy (Liberal)	MNA for Châteauguay; 1976–1985	Succeeded by Pierrette Cardinal (Liberal)
