= St. Hyacinthe—Rouville =

Former federal electoral district in Quebec, Canada

Quebec electoral district

Defunct federal electoral district
- Legislature: House of Commons
- District created: 1914
- District abolished: 1933
- First contested: 1917
- Last contested: 1930

St. Hyacinthe—Rouville (French: Saint-Hyacinthe—Rouville) was a federal electoral district in Quebec, Canada, that was represented in the House of Commons of Canada from 1917 to 1935.

This riding was created in 1914 from Rouville and St. Hyacinthe ridings. It consisted of the counties of St. Hyacinthe and Rouville.

It was abolished in 1933 when it was redistributed into Chambly—Rouville, Richelieu—Verchères and St. Hyacinthe—Bagot ridings.

== Members of Parliament ==
This riding elected the following members of Parliament:

Parliament	Years	Member	Party
St. Hyacinthe—Rouville; Riding created from Rouville and St. Hyacinthe
13th	1917–1921	Louis-Joseph Gauthier	Opposition (Laurier Liberals)
14th	1921–1925	René Morin	Liberal
15th	1925–1926	René Morin	Liberal
16th	1926–1930	René Morin	Liberal
17th	1930–1935	Adélard Fontaine	Liberal
Riding dissolved into Chambly—Rouville, Richelieu—Verchères and St. Hyacinthe—Bagot

== Election results ==
1917 Canadian federal election
Party	Candidate	Votes
Opposition (Laurier Liberals)	Louis-Joseph Gauthier	acclaimed

1921 Canadian federal election
Party	Candidate	Votes
Liberal	René Morin	9,425
Conservative	Louis-Joseph Gauthier	4,627

1925 Canadian federal election
Party	Candidate	Votes
Liberal	René Morin	7,645
Conservative	Jean-Baptiste Joseph Eugène Bousquet	2,790

1926 Canadian federal election
Party	Candidate	Votes
Liberal	René Morin	7,325
Conservative	Jean-Baptiste-Joseph-Eugène Bousquet	1,858

1930 Canadian federal election
Party	Candidate	Votes
Liberal	Adélard Fontaine	8,616
Conservative	Victor Sylvestre	7,459

== See also ==
- List of Canadian electoral districts
- Historical federal electoral districts of Canada
