= Howard B. Chase =

Howard Brown Chase, CBE (19 May 1884 – 19 February 1973) was a British-born Canadian trade union leader and public official. He was chairman of the Board of Governors of the Canadian Broadcasting Corporation from 1944 to 1945.

== Life and career ==
Chase was born in Essex, England on 19 May 1884, the son of an American father and an English mother who were visiting at the time. He began his career working on the Northern Pacific Railway at Fargo, working his way from the bottom to become a locomotive engineer. He came to Canada in July 1907 and worked as an engineer on the Canadian Northern Railway at Port Arthur, then for Canadian Pacific Railway and Canadian National Railway, transitioning from freight trains to passenger trains.

Having joined the Brotherhood of Locomotive Engineers in 1908, he was elected Assistant Grand Chief Engineer of the union, with responsibility for Canada, in 1933, a post he held until 1948 when he was appointed to the Board of Transport Commissioners. He served as technical adviser to the Canadian government's delegation to the International Labour Conference in Geneva in 1938.

In the run-up to the Second World War, Chase was appointed to the Defence Purchasing Board (later the War Supply Board) in July 1939. When the Board was taken over by the Department of Munitions and Supply in 1940, Chase became its director general of labour relations, negotiating settlements in numerous strikes. In August 1941, he was appointed government controller of the National Steel Car Corporation in Hamilton, Ontario after a second strike, where he settled the strike and raised production by a third.

In March 1943, Chase was appointed to the Board of Governors of the Canadian Broadcasting Corporation as a representative for labour. In July 1944, he became chairman of the Board, succeeding René Morin. He was appointed a Commander of the Order of the British Empire for his wartime work in 1946.

In 1948, Chase was appointed a member of the Board of Transport Commissioners, retiring in 1959. He died in Montreal in 1973, survived by three sons; his wife, Muriel Chase, née Jones, predeceased him.

Government offices
Preceded by René Morin	President of the Canadian Broadcasting Corporation; 1944–1945	Succeeded by Davidson Dunton
