= Jean-Baptiste Blanchet =

Canadian politician (1842–1904)

Member of the Canadian Parliament for St. Hyacinthe
- In office 1904–1904
- Preceded by: Michel-Esdras Bernier
- Succeeded by: Aimé Majorique Beauparlant

Personal details
- Born: 1842 Saint-Damase, Canada East
- Died: August 31, 1904 (aged 61–62)
- Party: Liberal
- Occupation: lawyer

Jean-Baptiste Blanchet (October 1842 – August 31, 1904) was a Canadian politician. Born in Saint-Damase, Canada East, he was elected to the House of Commons of Canada in a 1904 by-election as a Member of the Liberal Party to represent the riding of St. Hyacinthe. He died in office while having served for just 198 days. He was also an alderman for Saint-Hyacinthe, Quebec.
