= Paul Chevré =

Sculptor and Titanic survivor (1866–1914)

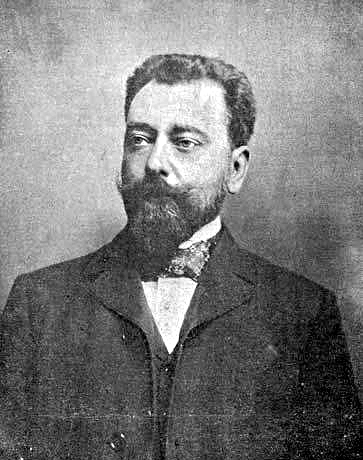
- Chevré circa 1910. This picture was widely publicized after the Titanic's sinking.
- Born: Paul Romaine Marie Léonce Chevré; 5 July 1866; Brussels, Belgium
- Died: 20 February 1914 (aged 47); Asnières-sur-Seine

Paul Chevré (5 July 1866–20 February 1914) was a French, Brussels-born sculptor who gained fame in Montréal after creating the Samuel de Champlain monument. He is the son of another sculptor, Romain Paul Chevré.

Samuel de Champlain was the founder of Québec, and the committee that selected the sculptor of his monument began its work on 2 January 1896 under the leadership of the politician Henri-Gustave Joly de Lotbinière, and it comprised artists like Napoléon Bourassa and François-Xavier Berlinguet. The decision to have Paul Chevré create the monument was controversial, as the regionally famed, native sculptor Philippe Hébert was not selected, despite proposing a very similar style. In 1900, he was awarded with a bronze medal at the Paris International Exhibition. His bronze public art work, Marianne (La République) (1913) is located in front of the Union Française building of Montréal. He was awarded with a commission in 1909 to produce a monument for Honoré Mercier, 9th premier of Québec. In 1911, he created a statue of François-Xavier Garneau, a Canadian historian.

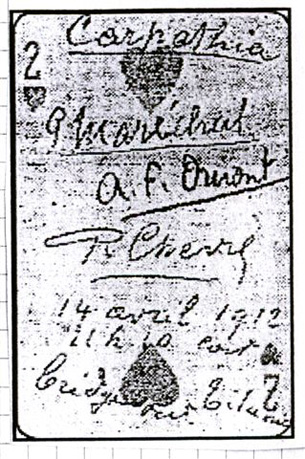
Playing card signed by three of the Titanic's survivors: Pierre Maréchal (father of Pierre Maréchal, a car racer), Alfred Fernand Omont, and Chevré

He is known for being a passenger on the Titanic's only voyage, and he survived on a life raft.

Chevré spent the time between the disaster and his death travelling between Canada and France, and he died in Asnières-sur-Seine near Paris.

== Works ==
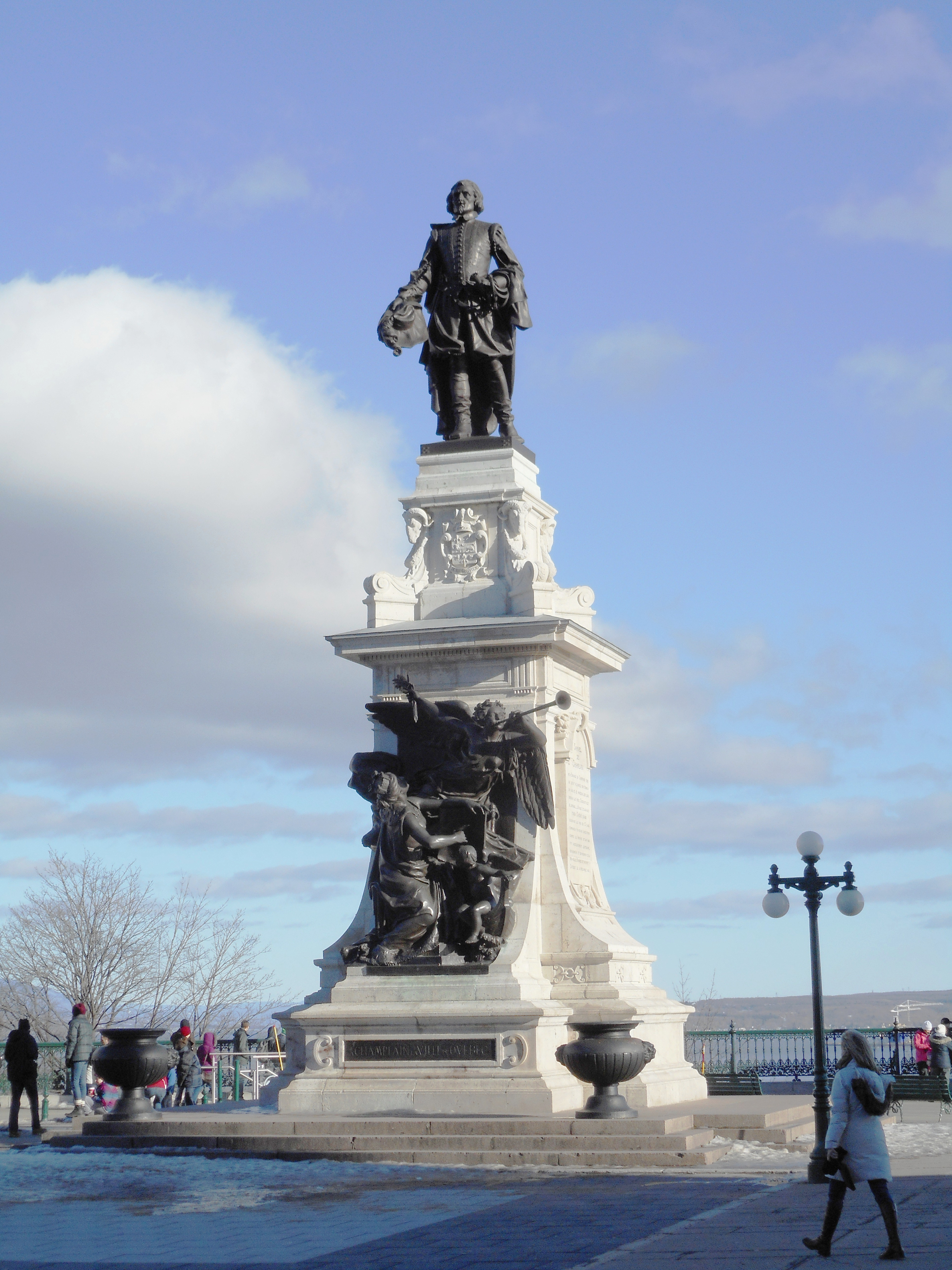
Samuel de Champlain monument (1898)

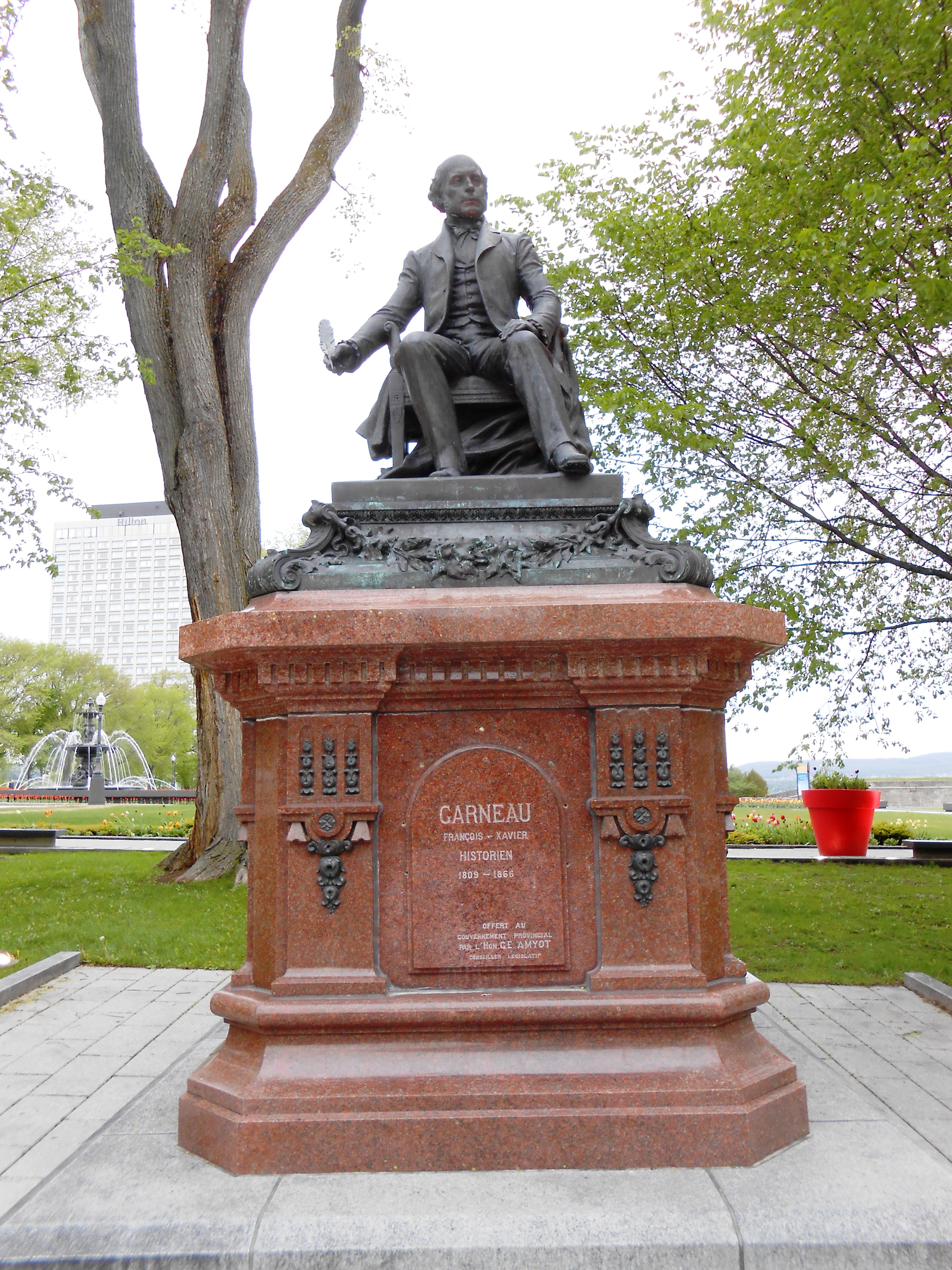
Monument to François-Xavier Garneau (1912)

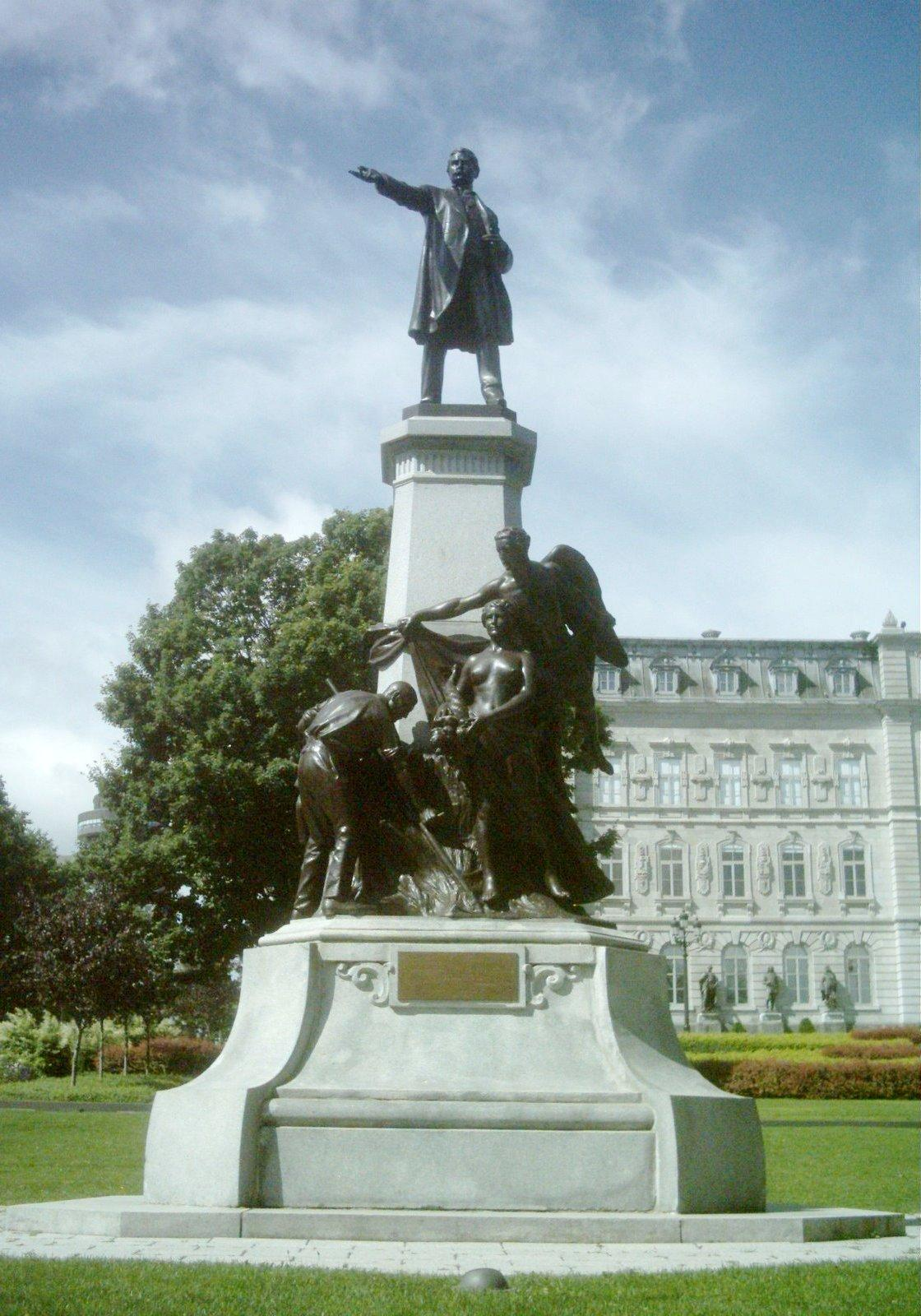
Monument to Honoré Mercier

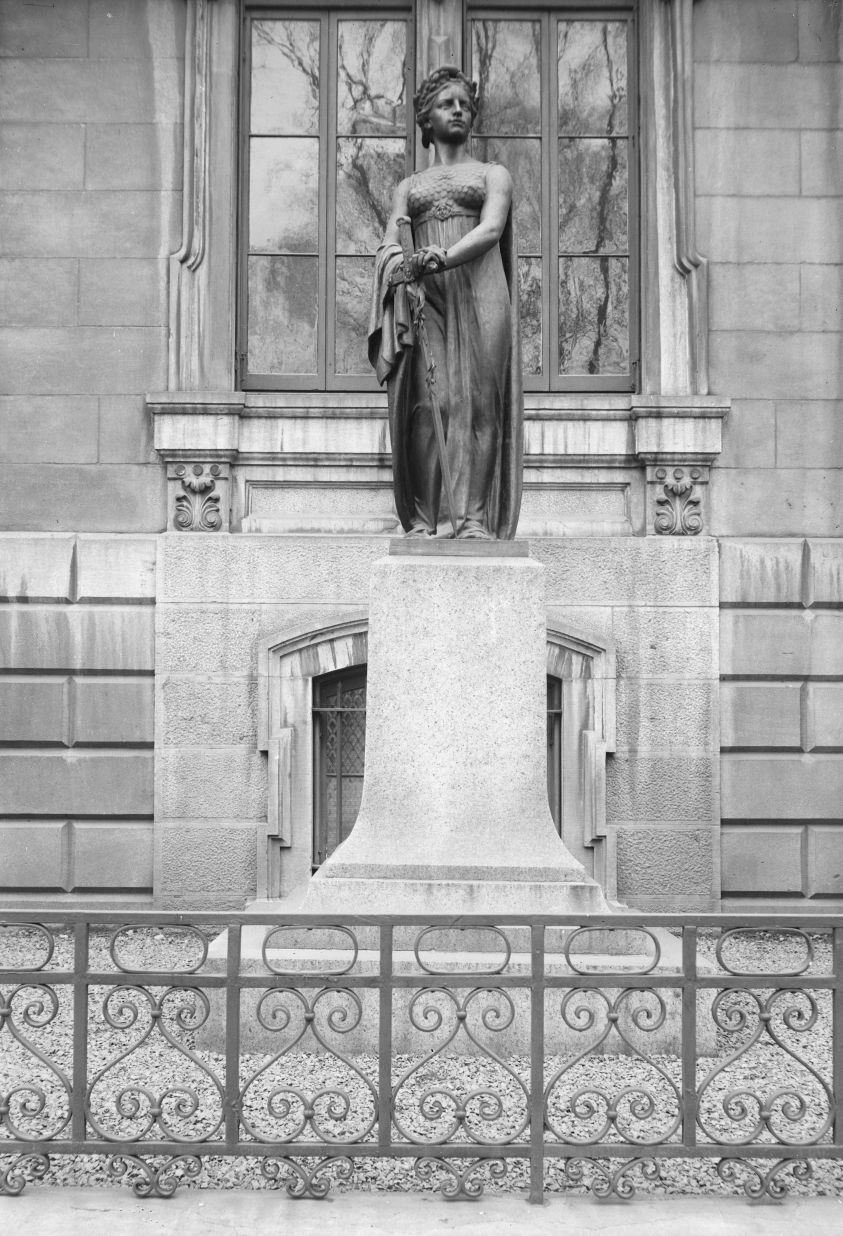
"Marianne ou La République" (1913)
