= Rouville (federal electoral district) =

Former federal electoral district in Quebec, Canada

Quebec electoral district

Defunct federal electoral district
- Legislature: House of Commons
- District created: 1867
- District abolished: 1914
- First contested: 1867
- Last contested: 1911

Rouville was a federal electoral district in Quebec, Canada, that was represented in the House of Commons of Canada from 1867 to 1917.

It was created by the British North America Act, 1867, and was abolished in 1914 when it was merged into St. Hyacinthe—Rouville riding.

== Members of Parliament ==
This riding elected the following members of Parliament:

Parliament	Years	Member	Party
Rouville
1st	1867–1872	Guillaume Cheval dit St-Jacques	Liberal
2nd	1872–1874	Honoré Mercier	Liberal
3rd	1874–1878	Guillaume Cheval dit St-Jacques	Liberal
4th	1878–1882	George-Auguste Gigault	Conservative
5th	1882–1887	George-Auguste Gigault	Conservative
6th	1887–1891	George-Auguste Gigault	Conservative
7th	1891–1896	Louis-Philippe Brodeur	Liberal
8th	1896–1900	Louis-Philippe Brodeur	Liberal
9th	1900–1904	Louis-Philippe Brodeur	Liberal
9th	1904–1904	Louis-Philippe Brodeur	Liberal
10th	1904–1908	Louis-Philippe Brodeur	Liberal
11th	1908–1911	Louis-Philippe Brodeur	Liberal
12th	1911–1917	Rodolphe Lemieux	Liberal
Riding dissolved into St. Hyacinthe—Rouville

== Election results ==
1867 Canadian federal election
Party	Candidate	Votes
Liberal	Guillaume Cheval dit St-Jacques	1,236
Unknown	Joseph-Napoléon Poulin	824
Source: Canadian Elections Database

1872 Canadian federal election
Party	Candidate	Votes
Liberal	Honoré Mercier	1,033
Liberal	Guillaume Cheval, Alias Saint-Jacques	977
Source: Canadian Elections Database

1874 Canadian federal election
Party	Candidate	Votes
Liberal	Guillaume Cheval dit St-Jacques	812
Conservative	George-Auguste Gigault	73

1878 Canadian federal election
Party	Candidate	Votes
Conservative	George-Auguste Gigault	1,073
Liberal	Guillaume Cheval dit St-Jacques	1,038

1882 Canadian federal election
Party	Candidate	Votes
Conservative	George-Auguste Gigault	1,199
Unknown	Ed. Lareau	1,045

1887 Canadian federal election
Party	Candidate	Votes
Conservative	George-Auguste Gigault	acclaimed

1891 Canadian federal election
Party	Candidate	Votes
Liberal	Louis-Philippe Brodeur	1,289
Conservative	George-Auguste Gigault	1,220

1896 Canadian federal election
Party	Candidate	Votes
Liberal	Louis-Philippe Brodeur	1,840
Conservative	J. A. Fournier	870

1900 Canadian federal election
Party	Candidate	Votes
Liberal	Louis-Philippe Brodeur	1,767
Conservative	Joseph-Arthur David	682

By-election: On Mr. Brodeur being appointed Minister of Inland Revenue, 19 January 1904

By-election on 30 January 1904
Party	Candidate	Votes
Liberal	Louis-Philippe Brodeur	acclaimed

1904 Canadian federal election
Party	Candidate	Votes
Liberal	Louis-Philippe Brodeur	1,671
Conservative	J. A. Nadeau	999

1908 Canadian federal election
Party	Candidate	Votes
Liberal	Louis-Philippe Brodeur	acclaimed

1911 Canadian federal election
Party	Candidate	Votes
Liberal	Rodolphe Lemieux	1,467
Conservative	Hormidas Dubreuil	1,189

== See also ==
- List of Canadian electoral districts
- Historical federal electoral districts of Canada
