= William Greig (politician) =

Canadian politician

William Greig (August 12, 1840 – January 10, 1918) was a farmer, lumber merchant and political figure in Quebec. He represented Châteauguay in the Legislative Assembly of Quebec from 1892 to 1897 as a Conservative.

He was born in Howick, Lower Canada, the son of William Greig and Janet Brodie, and was educated there. Greig also operated a sawmill. In 1879, he married Janet Templeton. He was defeated by Joseph-Émery Robidoux when he ran for a seat in the Quebec assembly in 1890. He defeated Robidoux to win the seat in 1892 but lost again to Robidoux in 1897 when he ran for reelection. Greig also ran unsuccessfully for a seat in the House of Commons in 1900. He died in Ormstown at the age of 77.
