= Louis Tellier =

Canadian politician

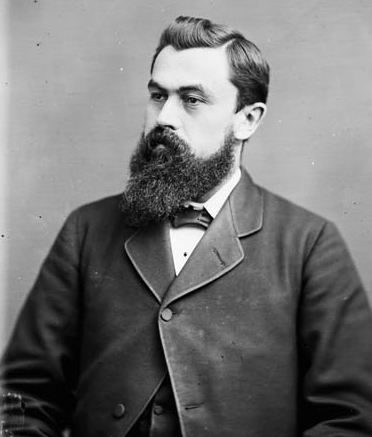

Member of the Canadian Parliament for St. Hyacinthe
- In office 1878–1882
- Preceded by: Louis Delorme
- Succeeded by: Michel Esdras Bernier

Personal details
- Born: 24 December 1842 Berthier-en-Haut, Canada East
- Died: 17 June 1935 (aged 92)
- Party: Conservative

Louis Tellier (French pronunciation: [lwi tɛlje]; 24 December 1842 – 17 June 1935) was a Canadian lawyer, politician, and judge.

== Biography ==
Born in Berthier-en-Haut, Canada East, the son of Zephirin and Luce (Ferland) Tellier, Tellier completed his classical education at Joliette College in Joliette, Canada East. He studied law with Hon. Louis François Georges Baby, Joliette, and finished with Hon. Hubert W. Chagnon, in Saint-Hyacinthe, Quebec. He was called to the Quebec Bar in 1866, and practiced law in St. Hyacinthe. He was appointed a Queen's Counsel in 1882. From 1863 to 1873, he was Deputy Prothonotary of the Superior Court, and Deputy Clerk of the Circuit Court for the district. From 1873 to 1878 he was a Crown Attorney.

He was elected to the House of Commons of Canada for St. Hyacinthe in the 1878 election; he then defeated Honoré Mercier who was running for the Liberal Party. A Conservative, he was defeated in the 1882 election.

In 1887, he was made a Judge of the Superior Court of the Province of Quebec for Saint-Hyacinthe district. In 1903, he was transferred to Montreal. Tellier retired from the bench in 1915.

In 1868, Tellier married Hermine Malhiot.

Louis Tellier is the brother of Sir Joseph-Mathias Tellier, who is the father of Maurice Tellier, and the grandfather of Paul Tellier. He is also a first cousin of Raymond Tellier, who is the grandfather of Luc-Normand Tellier.

== Electoral record ==
1874 Canadian federal election: St. Hyacinthe
Party	Candidate	Votes
Liberal	Louis Delorme	acclaimed
Source: lop.parl.ca

1878 Canadian federal election: St. Hyacinthe
Party	Candidate	Votes
Conservative	Louis Tellier	1,181
Liberal	Honoré Mercier	1,175
