= Hôpital Honoré-Mercier =

Hôpital Honoré-Mercier Honoré-Mercier Hospital
- CISSS Montérégie-Est; RLS Richhelieu-Yamaska
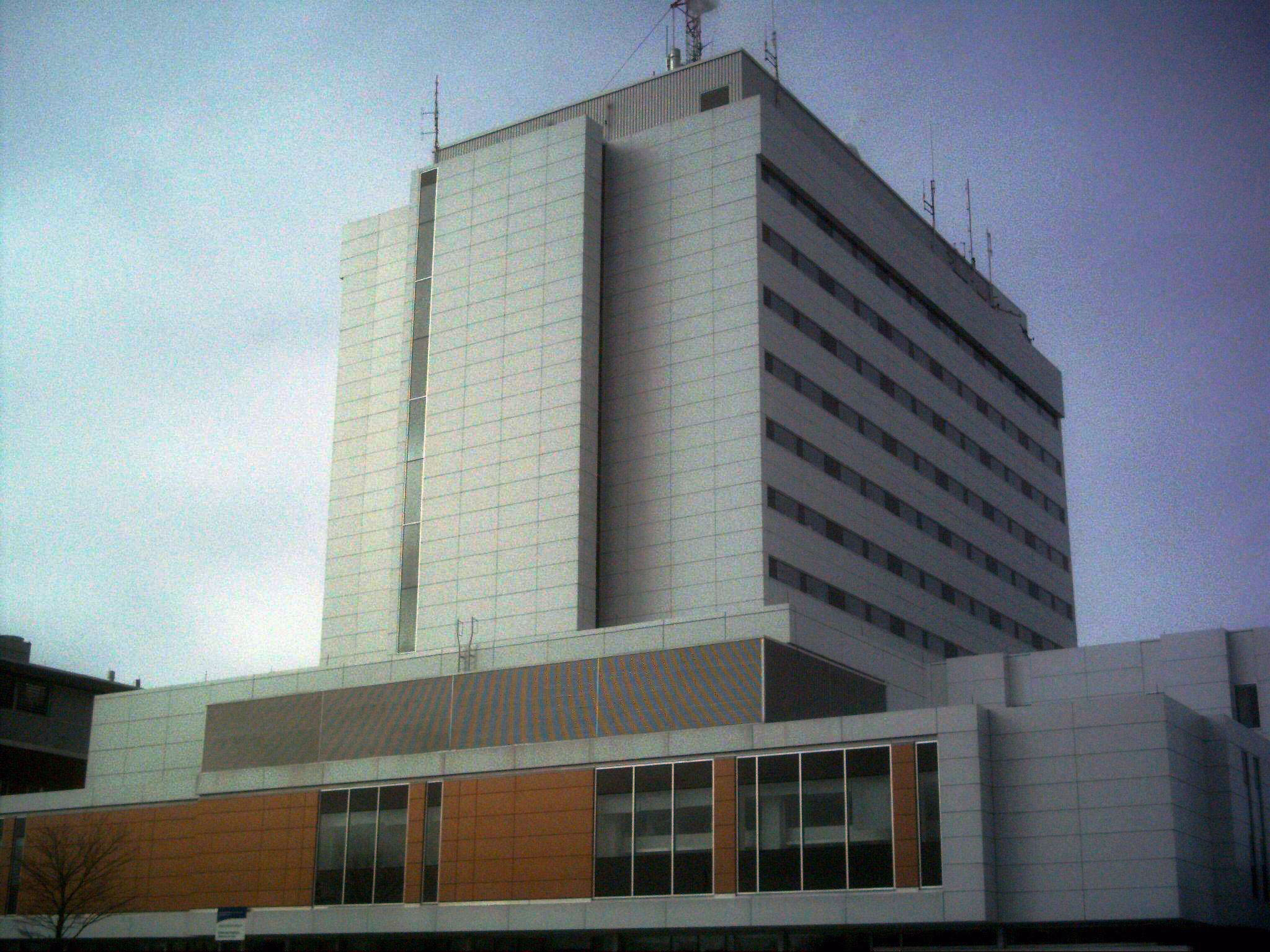

- Location in Southern Quebec

Geography
- Location: 2750 Boulevard Laframboise; Saint-Hyacinthe, Quebec, Canada
- Coordinates: 45.6334388°N 72.9603455°W

Organization
- Care system: RAMQ (Quebec medicare)

Services
- Emergency department: Level III trauma centre
- Beds: 213 acute care 35 short-term psychiatric 25 mental health shelter

History
- Founded: 1902

Links
- Website: Official website
- Lists: Hospitals in Canada

The Honoré Mercier Hospital (French: Hôpital Honoré-Mercier) is the major hospital in Saint-Hyacinthe, Quebec, Canada. It serves Saint-Hyacinthe its surrounding Les Maskoutains Regional County Municipality, as well as the neighbouring Acton Regional County Municipality and La Vallée-du-Richelieu Regional County Municipality.

It currently has 213 acute care, 35 short-term psychiatric and 25 mental health shelter beds (Saint-Charles Pavilion).

The hospital is named for Honoré Mercier, a lawyer, journalist and politician best known for being the ninth Premier of Quebec from 27 January 1887 to 21 December 1891.

== History ==
Hôpital Saint-Charles (Saint-Charles Hospital) opened at the request of Monseigneur Louis-Zéphirin Moreau in 1902 as the first hospital in Saint-Hyacinthe. In 1928, construction began on the new Saint-Charles Hospital in its current location, with the hospital opening in 1930. The hospital was renamed Hôpital Général de Saint-Hyacinthe (Saint-Hyacinthe General Hospital) in 1964.

In 1968, the Hôpital Honoré-Mercier Corporation was created. On 13 November 1971, Hôpital Honoré-Mercier was inaugurated. The hospital was renamed Centre hospitalier Honoré-Mercier Inc. in 1984. A new emergency room opened on 26 April 1994. From June 2001 to April 2007, the hospital was renovated to correct water infiltration problems in the building. In 2004, the Hervé-Gagnon Pavilion opened, named for a longtime doctor of the hospital.
