= Marie-Chantal Chassé =

Canadian politician

The Honourable Marie-Chantal Chassé
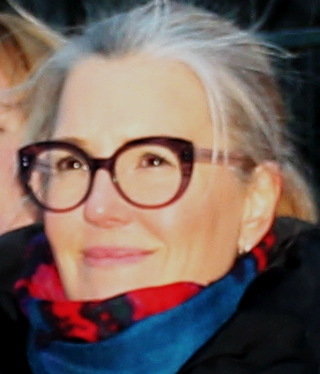
- MarieChantal Chassé in 2018

Member of the National Assembly of Quebec for Châteauguay
- In office October 1, 2018 – August 28, 2022
- Preceded by: Pierre Moreau
- Succeeded by: Marie-Belle Gendron

Personal details
- Born: October 20, 1966 (age 59) Montreal (Quebec, Canada)
- Party: Coalition Avenir Québec
- Profession: Engineer; Chairperson; Corporate Director mentor

Marie-Chantal Chassé (born October 20, 1966, Montreal) is a Canadian entrepreneur and politician from Quebec. She was elected to the National Assembly of Quebec in the 2018 provincial election and represented the electoral district of Châteauguay as a member of the Coalition Avenir Québec from 2018 to 2022.

She was Minister of the Environment and the Fight Against Climate Change from October 2018 to January 2019.

== Biography ==
Marie-Chantal Chassé was born in Montreal on October 20, 1966, to a mother who was an elementary school teacher and a father who worked as an engineer in the municipal sector.

=== Education ===
Marie-Chantal Chassé begins her high school education at Collège Durocher Saint-Lambert in 1979.

In 1991, she completed a bachelor's degree in materials engineering with a specialization in technological innovation and entrepreneurship at Polytechnique Montréal. This diploma precedes her adhesion to the Ordre des ingénieurs du Québec (OIQ) in 1992 and the Institute of Corporate Directors (ICD) in 2012.

=== Engineering career ===
Marie-Chantal Chassé was responsible for a pilot project to implement continuous improvement programs at Alcan's plants in the early 1990s.

=== Entrepreneurial career ===
Marie-Chantal Chassé is still employed by Alcan when she enters the entrepreneurial ecosystem in 1997 by contributing to the launch of a relative's company. During her second maternity leave, she dedicates herself full-time to entrepreneurship and develops a passion for it. She becomes a shareholder in "Just in Time Aeronautic Assistance" (JITAA), a company that offers technical assistance, maintenance, and repair services for aircraft. In less than four years, JITAA generated revenues of $10 million.

In 1999, the American branch of JITAA was created, of which Marie-Chantal Chassé is also a shareholder.

Affected by the global economic downturn in the aeronautics sector due to the terrorist attacks in the United States, the Canadian branch of JITAA closed its doors in December 2002.

Marie-Chantal Chassé relaunches JITAA's Canadian activities as sole shareholder in December 2002, this time under a new name, "JMJ Aéronautique". She then acquires all the shares of JITAA's American sister company, still in operation at the time, and renames it "JMJ Aerospace".

In order to focus on her new role as Hon. Member for the Châteauguay electoral district in the National Assembly of Québec, Marie-Chantal Chassé transferred her company's operations in May 2018. JMJ Aéronautique changes its name in June 2020 to "JMJ Evolution". The same year, Marie-Chantal Chassé transfers the leadership of the business to Angelika Wojcik while remaining its main shareholder. JMJ Evolution celebrates its 25th anniversary in 2021.

After her departure from politics, Marie-Chantal Chassé worked as a consultant, mentor and corporate director.

=== Political career ===
Marie-Chantal Chassé is elected in the 2018 Quebec general election, the latter resulting in the first government led by the Coalition Avenir Québec. For her first name, she used the spelling MarieChantal without the hyphen.

In François Legault's first cabinet of ministers, she was appointed Minister of the Environment and the Fight Against Climate Change. On January 8, 2019, she resigned from her position as minister at the request of the Prime Minister, representing the first cabinet shuffle since the Legault cabinet was sworn in on October 18. She is replaced by Benoit Charette, Hon. Member of the Deux-Montagnes electoral district. During an interview on the TVA network with journalist Alain Laforest in March 2019, MarieChantal Chassé indicated that the quick end of her mandate was due to the fact that she was just starting out in the role of minister. She also mentions that the environment was the CAQ's blind spot.

Marie-Chantal Chassé then became Chair of the Committee on Citizen Relations on February 6, 2019, a position she held until September 16, 2020.

She began her last role in politics on September 16, 2020, as Parliamentary Assistant to the Minister of Economy and Innovation ("innovation" and "entrepreneurship" sections), a term that expires on August 28, 2022.

In this position, Marie-Chantal Chassé created the first "Grand Rendez-vous de l'innovation québécoise", an initiative of the Ministry of Economy and Innovation in collaboration with the Conseil de l'innovation du Québec, which builds on the province's local strengths in research and innovation. The event is being held in Montreal and online on November 18 and 19, 2021, while Marie-Chantal Chassé is acting as master of ceremonies. The gathering is part of the final consultations surrounding the "Stratégie québécoise de recherche et d'innovation (SQRI)", which ends in 2022, and is aimed at stimulating the provincial business ecosystem. Marie-Chantal Chassé was then responsible for the implementation of Quebec government's following strategy, the "SQRI²" (2022–2027), representing an investment of approximately 7.5 billion CAD spread over 5 years.

On May 20, 2022, she announced that she was retiring from political life at the end of her term.
