= Châteauguay (provincial electoral district) =

Provincial electoral district in Quebec, Canada

Coordinates: 45°19′N 73°44′W

Quebec electoral district

Provincial electoral district
- Legislature: National Assembly of Quebec
MNA
Félix Rhéaume
Liberal
- District created: 1867
- District abolished: 1939
- District re-created: 1944
- First contested: 1867
- Last contested: 2026

Demographics
- Population (2006): 57,781
- Electors (2012): 49,230
- Area (km²): 244.2
- Pop. density (per km²): 236.6
- Census division: Roussillon (part)
- Census subdivision(s): Châteauguay, Léry, Mercier, Saint-Isidore, Kahnawake

Châteauguay (French pronunciation: [ʃatoɡɛ]) is a provincial electoral district in the Montérégie region of Quebec, Canada, which elects a member to the National Assembly of Quebec. It notably includes the city of Châteauguay, its namesake.

It was originally created in 1867 (and an electoral district of that name existed earlier in the Legislative Assembly of the Province of Canada). Its final election was in 1936. It disappeared in the 1939 and its successor electoral district was Châteauguay-Laprairie.

However, Châteauguay-Laprairie only existed for one election. Châteauguay was re-created for the 1944 election.

In the change from the 2001 to the 2011 electoral map, it lost Sainte-Catherine to the newly created Sanguinet electoral district.

== Geography ==
It consists of the municipalities of:

- Châteauguay
- Léry
- Mercier
- Saint-Isidore

It also consists of the Indian reserve of:

- Kahnawake

== Linguistic demographics ==
- Francophone: 72.3%
- Anglophone: 20.9%
- Allophone: 6.8%

== Members of the Legislative Assembly / National Assembly ==
Legislature	Years	Member	Party
1st	1867–1871	Édouard Laberge	Liberal
2nd	1871–1875	Édouard Laberge	Liberal
3rd	1875–1878	Édouard Laberge	Liberal
4th	1878–1881	Édouard Laberge	Liberal
5th	1881–1883†	Édouard Laberge	Liberal
5th	1884–1886	Joseph-Émery Robidoux	Liberal
6th	1886–1890	Joseph-Émery Robidoux	Liberal
7th	1890–1892	Joseph-Émery Robidoux	Liberal
8th	1892–1897	William Greig	Conservative
9th	1897–1900	Joseph-Émery Robidoux	Liberal
10th	1900–1904	François-Xavier Dupuis	Liberal
11th	1904–1907	François-Xavier Dupuis	Liberal
11th	1907–1908	Honoré Mercier Jr.	Liberal
12th	1908–1908	Hospice Desrosiers	Conservative
12th	1908–1912	Honoré Mercier Jr.	Liberal
13th	1912–1916	Honoré Mercier Jr.	Liberal
14th	1916–1919	Honoré Mercier Jr.	Liberal
15th	1919–1923	Honoré Mercier Jr.	Liberal
16th	1923–1927	Honoré Mercier Jr.	Liberal
17th	1927–1931	Honoré Mercier Jr.	Liberal
18th	1931–1935	Honoré Mercier Jr.	Liberal
19th	1935–1936	Honoré Mercier Jr.	Liberal
20th	1936–1939	Auguste Boyer	Union Nationale
Riding dissolved into Châteauguay-Laprairie
Riding re-created from Châteauguay-Laprairie
22nd	1944–1948	Honoré Mercier III	Liberal
23rd	1948–1952	Arthur Laberge	Union Nationale
24th	1952–1956	Arthur Laberge	Union Nationale
25th	1956–1957	Arthur Laberge	Union Nationale
25th	1957–1960	Joseph-Maurice Laberge	Union Nationale
26th	1960–1962	Joseph-Maurice Laberge	Union Nationale
27th	1962–1966	George Kennedy	Liberal
28th	1966–1970	George Kennedy	Liberal
29th	1970–1973	George Kennedy	Liberal
30th	1973–1976	George Kennedy	Liberal
31st	1976–1981	Roland Dussault	Parti Québécois
32nd	1981–1985	Roland Dussault	Parti Québécois
33rd	1985–1989	Pierrette Cardinal	Liberal
34th	1989–1994	Pierrette Cardinal	Liberal
35th	1994–1998	Jean-Marc Fournier	Liberal
36th	1998–2003	Jean-Marc Fournier	Liberal
37th	2003–2007	Jean-Marc Fournier	Liberal
38th	2007–2008	Jean-Marc Fournier	Liberal
39th	2008–2012	Pierre Moreau	Liberal
40th	2012–2014	Pierre Moreau	Liberal
41st	2014–2018	Pierre Moreau	Liberal
42nd	2018–2022	MarieChantal Chassé	Coalition Avenir Québec
43rd	2022–2026	Marie-Belle Gendron	Coalition Avenir Québec
44th	2026–Present	Félix Rhéaume	Liberal

== Electoral results ==
2026 Quebec general election
** Preliminary results — Not yet official **
Party	Candidate	Votes	%	±%
Liberal	Félix Rhéaume	12,343	35.76	+10.98
Parti Québécois	Yannick Trudeau	9,651	27.96	+16.12
Coalition Avenir Québec	Marie-Belle Gendron	4,663	13.51	–25.61
Conservative	Mohsen Eshtiaghi	4,251	12.32	+2.23
Québec solidaire	Marianne Pharand-Roy	3,037	8.80	–3.98
Green	José Bro	329	0.95	–0.44
Canadian	Hannah Wolker	240	0.70	N/A
Total valid votes		34,514	98.36	–0.38
Total rejected ballots		575	1.64	+0.38
Turnout		35,089	61.46	–0.52
Electors on the lists		57,091		
Liberal gain from Coalition Avenir Québec		Swing		–2.57
Source: Élections Québec

2022 Quebec general election
Party	Candidate	Votes	%	±%
Coalition Avenir Québec	Marie-Belle Gendron	13,038	39.12	+2.06
Liberal	Jean-François Primeau	8,260	24.78	-8.89
Québec solidaire	Martin Bécotte	4,261	12.78	-0.03
Parti Québécois	Marianne Lafleur	3,947	11.84	-0.42
Conservative	Patric Viau	3,363	10.09	+8.71
Green	Stephanie Stevenson	463	1.39	-0.5
Total valid votes		33,332	98.74	
Total rejected ballots		425	1.26	
Turnout		33,757	61.98	-1.88
Electors on the lists		54,467		

2018 Quebec general election
Party	Candidate	Votes	%	±%
Coalition Avenir Québec	Marie-Chantal Chassé	12,259	37.06	+16.82
Liberal	Pierre Moreau	11,138	33.67	-15.96
Québec solidaire	Sandrine Garcia-McDiarmid	4,236	12.81	+7.09
Parti Québécois	Jean-Philippe Thériault	4,055	12.26	-10.66
Green	Stephanie Stevenson	624	1.89	
Conservative	Jeff Benoit	458	1.38	+0.9
New Democratic	Marie-Ève Masucci-Lauzon	310	0.94	
Total valid votes		33,080	98.40	
Total rejected ballots		539	1.60	
Turnout		33,619	63.86	
Eligible voters		52,642		
Coalition Avenir Québec gain from Liberal		Swing		+16.39
Source(s) "Rapport des résultats officiels du scrutin". Élections Québec.

2014 Quebec general election
Party	Candidate	Votes	%	±%
Liberal	Pierre Moreau	17,876	49.63	+11.99
Parti Québécois	Laurent Pilon	8,257	22.92	–8.68
Coalition Avenir Québec	Claudia Cloutier	7,292	20.24	–3.55
Québec solidaire	Xavier P.-Laberge	2,059	5.72	+2.40
Option nationale	Vincent Masse	199	0.55	–0.53
Conservative	Claude Chalhoub	174	0.48	–0.23
Marxist–Leninist	Linda Sullivan	104	0.29	
Quebec Citizens' Union	François Mailly	58	0.16	
Total valid votes		36,019	100.0	
Total rejected ballots		530	1.45	
Turnout		36,549	72.56	
Electors on the lists		50,370		
Liberal hold		Swing		+10.34

2012 Quebec general election
Party	Candidate	Votes	%	±%
Liberal	Pierre Moreau	13,819	37.64	-7.09
Parti Québécois	Maryse Perreault	11,599	31.60	-5.84
Coalition Avenir Québec	Denis Leftakis	8,734	23.79	+12.05
Québec solidaire	Xavier P. Laberge	1,220	3.32	+1.16
Green	Denis Côté	684	1.86	-1.11
Option nationale	Nicolas Dionne	396	1.08	–
Conservative	Jean-Paul Pellerin	259	0.71	–
Total valid votes		36,711	98.62	–
Total rejected ballots		512	1.38	–
Turnout		37,223	75.43	+17.17
Electors on the lists		49,347	–	–

^ Change based on redistributed results. Coalition Avenir change is from Action démocratique

2008 Quebec general election
Party	Candidate	Votes	%
Liberal	Pierre Moreau	13,637	41.49
Parti Québécois	Michel Pinard	13,142	39.99
Action démocratique	Geneviève Tousignant	4,091	12.45
Green	Johanne Côté	967	2.94
Québec solidaire	Véronique Pronovost	703	2.14
Parti indépendantiste	Nicole Caron	213	0.65
Marxist–Leninist	Hélène Héroux	114	0.35
Total valid votes		32,867	100.00
Rejected and declined votes		559	
Turnout		33,426	58.26
Electors on the lists		57,375	
Source: Official Results, Le Directeur général des élections du Québec.

2007 Quebec general election
Party	Candidate	Votes	%	±%
Liberal	Jean-Marc Fournier	15,279	37.42	-14.38
Action démocratique	Chantal Marin	12,228	29.94	+18.79
Parti Québécois	Michel Pinard	11,208	27.45	-7.41
Green	Khalil Saade	1,154	2.83	–
Québec solidaire	Véronique Pronovost	967	2.37	+1.81*
Total valid votes		40,836	98.83	–
Total rejected ballots		485	1.17	–
Turnout		41,321	73.85	-0.48
Electors on the lists		55,949	–	–

* Result compared to UFP

2003 Quebec general election
Party	Candidate	Votes	%	±%
Liberal	Jean-Marc Fournier	20,434	51.80	+4.88
Parti Québécois	Éric Cardinal	13,751	34.86	-8.22
Action démocratique	Daniel Lapointe	4,399	11.15	+2.09
Bloc Pot	Gilles Lalumière	547	1.39	–
UFP	Guylaine Sirard	222	0.56	–
Equality	Robert Jason Morgan	93	0.24	-0.37
Total valid votes		39,446	98.62	–
Total rejected ballots		552	1.38	–
Turnout		39,998	74.33	-9.85
Electors on the lists		53,810	–	–

1998 Quebec general election
Party	Candidate	Votes	%	±%
Liberal	Jean-Marc Fournier	16,655	46.92	-4.37
Parti Québécois	Carole Freeman	15,291	43.08	-2.55
Action démocratique	Luc Leclerc	3,217	9.06	–
Equality	Ernest Bergeron	216	0.61	–
Socialist Democracy	Victorien Pilote	114	0.32	–
Total valid votes		35,493	99.01	–
Total rejected ballots		355	0.99	–
Turnout		35,848	84.18	-2.84
Electors on the lists		42,587	–	–

1995 Quebec referendum
Side	Votes	%
Non	20,443	52.52
Oui	18,481	47.48

== See also ==
- List of Quebec provincial electoral districts
- Canadian provincial electoral districts
