= Félix Rhéaume =

Félix Rhéaume MNA

Member of the National Assembly for Châteauguay
- Incumbent
- Assumed office October 5, 2026
- Preceded by: Marie-Belle Gendron

Personal details
- Party: Liberal

Félix Rhéaume is a Canadian politician who is a candidate for the National Assembly of Quebec for Châteauguay in the 2026 Quebec general election as a member of the Quebec Liberal Party.
