= Joseph-Émery Robidoux =

Canadian politician

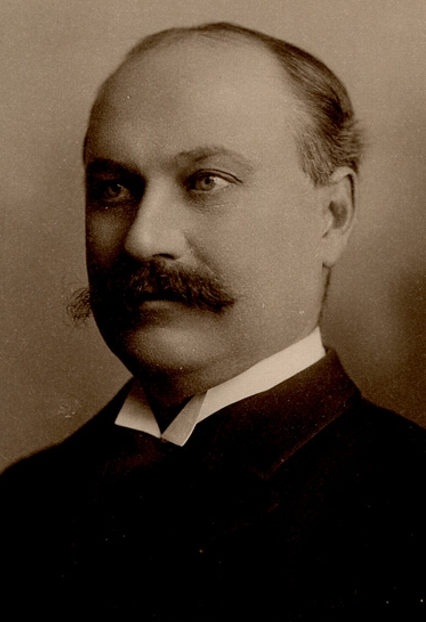

Member of the Legislative Assembly of Quebec for Châteauguay
- In office 1884–1892
- Preceded by: Édouard Laberge
- Succeeded by: William Greig
- In office 1897–1900
- Preceded by: William Greig
- Succeeded by: François-Xavier Dupuis

Personal details
- Born: March 10, 1843 Saint-Philippe, Canada East
- Died: March 15, 1929 (aged 86) Montreal, Quebec
- Party: Liberal

Joseph-Émery Robidoux, KC (March 10, 1843 – March 15, 1929) was a lawyer, judge and political figure in Quebec. He represented Châteauguay in the Legislative Assembly of Quebec from 1884 to 1892 and from 1897 to 1900 as a Liberal.

He was born in Saint-Philippe, Canada East, the son of Toussaint Robidoux and Marguerite Demers, and was educated at the Collège de Montréal, at the Collège Sainte-Marie and McGill University. Robidoux was admitted to the Lower Canada bar in 1866 and set up practice at Montréal, practising with Thomas Fortin, Amédée Geoffrion and Cuthbert-Alphonse Chênevert. In 1878, he was named Queen's Counsel. Robidoux also taught law at McGill University, where he was professor emeritus from 1890 to 1928. In 1882, he was an unsuccessful candidate for a seat in the House of Commons. Robidoux was first elected to the Quebec assembly in an 1884 by-election held after the death of Édouard Laberge. He served in the Quebec cabinet as provincial secretary in 1890 and again from 1897 to 1900 and as attorney general from 1890 to 1891. He was defeated by William Greig when he ran for reelection in 1892 but was elected again in 1897, defeating Greig.

Robidoux was bâtonnier for the Montreal bar in 1895 and 1896, president of the Canadian Bar Association in 1896 and bâtonnier for the Quebec bar in 1896 and 1897. He was named a chevalier in the French Légion d'honneur in 1908.

He was married twice: to Sophie Sancer in 1868 and to Clara Sancer, his first wife's sister, in 1878.

He resigned his seat in the Quebec assembly after being named judge in the Quebec Superior Court for Trois-Rivières district in 1900. In 1901, he was transferred to Montreal district and, in 1906, to Terrebonne district. He retired from the bench in 1916. Robidoux died at Montréal at the age of 86 and was buried in the Notre-Dame-des-Neiges Cemetery.
