= Honoré Mercier Jr. =

Canadian politician

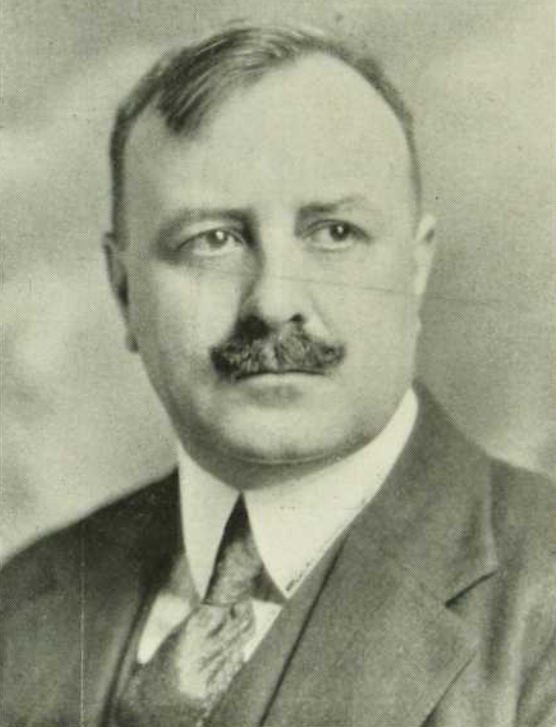

Member of the Legislative Assembly of Quebec for Châteauguay
- In office 1908–1936
- Preceded by: Hospice Desrosiers
- Succeeded by: Auguste Boyer
- In office 1907–1908
- Preceded by: François-Xavier Dupuis
- Succeeded by: Hospice Desrosiers

Personal details
- Born: March 20, 1875 Saint-Athanase, Quebec, Canada
- Died: June 19, 1937 (aged 62) Châteauguay, Quebec, Canada
- Party: Liberal
- Spouse: Jeanne Fréchette
- Children: Honoré Mercier III
- Education: Collège Sainte-Marie; Université Laval
- Profession: Lawyer

Honoré Mercier Jr. KC (20 March 1875 – 19 June 1937) was a member of the Legislative Assembly of Quebec. He was the son of the former Quebec Premier Honoré Mercier and father of Honoré Mercier III.

== Early years ==
Mercier was born in Saint-Hyacinthe, Quebec, and attended Collège Sainte-Marie and Université Laval law school. He was admitted to the Quebec Bar in 1900 and became a KC in 1913.

Mercier was a lawyer prior to his political career.

== Politics ==
He was first elected in the 1904 Quebec general election for the Quebec Liberal Party, but was defeated in 1908. However, he was then elected in a 1908 by-election, and remained in the Legislative Assembly until 1936, when he did not run for re-election. He served in numerous Cabinet posts under Premiers Lomer Gouin and Louis-Alexandre Taschereau:

- Minister of Colonisation
- Minister of Mines and Fisheries 1914–1919
- Minister of Lands and Forestry 1919–1936

== Outside politics ==
Besides his legal practice, Mercier was a member, director and headed of various organizations in Quebec:

- Director and Secretary-Treasurer, l'École des hautes études commerciales de Montréal 1907-1921
- President, l'Association internationale pour la conservation du gibier et du poisson
- Member of Montreal Press Club,
- Member of the Canadian Club
- Member of Cercle universitaire
- Member, Club Saint-Denis
- Member, Club de réforme
- Member, l'Union interalliée de Paris
- Member, Ligue maritime et coloniale française

Gérald Fauteux was his nephew.

== Honours ==
He was honoured with the Knight (chevalier) of the Legion of Honour of France.
