= Honoré Mercier III =

Canadian politician

Member of the Legislative Assembly of Quebec for Châteauguay
- In office 1944–1948
- Preceded by: None - riding split from Châteauguay-Laprairie
- Succeeded by: Arthur Laberge

Mayor of Léry, Quebec
- In office 1948–1950

Personal details
- Born: November 17, 1908 Montreal, Quebec
- Died: July 14, 1988 (aged 79) Montreal, Quebec
- Party: Liberal
- Spouse: Héva Fauteux
- Education: Collège Sainte-Marie de Montréal; Collège de Saint-Jean

Honoré Mercier III (17 November 1908 – 14 July 1988) was a member of the Legislative Assembly of Quebec, the grandson of Honoré Mercier and the son of Honoré Mercier fils.

Mercier was born in Montreal to Honoré Mercier fils, Liberal MLA and cabinet minister and Jeanne Fréchette.

He was mayor of Léry, Quebec from 1948 to 1950.

He was first elected to the Legislative Assembly in the 1944 Quebec general election for the Quebec Liberal Party. However, he was defeated in 1948, 1952, and again in 1960.
