= Louis-Joseph Gauthier =

Canadian politician (1866–1938)

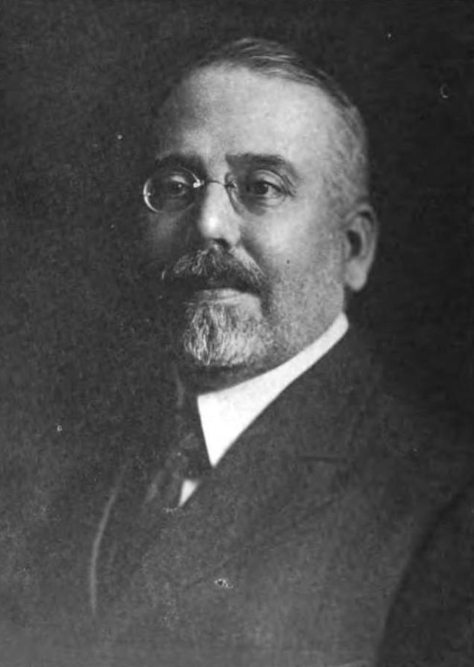

Member of the House of Commons of Canada
- In office 1911–1921
- Constituency: St. Hyacinthe, St. Hyacinthe—Rouville

Member of the Legislative Assembly of Quebec
- In office 1906–1908
- Constituency: L'Assomption

Personal details
- Born: March 21, 1866 Montreal, Canada East
- Died: April 12, 1938 (aged 72) Montreal, Quebec
- Resting place: Notre Dame des Neiges Cemetery
- Party: Liberal
- Spouses: Marie-Amazilie Morency (m. 1893) Marie-Anne Desmarais (m. 1901)
- Occupation: Lawyer, politician

Louis-Joseph Gauthier, KC (March 21, 1866 – April 12, 1938) was a lawyer and political figure in Quebec. He represented L'Assomption in the Legislative Assembly of Quebec from 1906 to 1908 and St. Hyacinthe and then St. Hyacinthe—Rouville in the House of Commons of Canada from 1911 to 1921 as a Liberal.

== Biography ==
He was born in Montreal, Canada East, the son of Joseph Gauthier and Julie Généreux, and was educated at the Séminaire de Montréal and the Université Laval at Montreal. Gauthier was admitted to the Quebec bar in 1889 and practised in Montreal, Laurentides and Westmount. In 1901, he was named King's Counsel. Gauthier was a mayor of Laurentides in 1905. He was elected to the Quebec assembly in a 1906 by-election held after Joseph-Édouard Duhamel resigned his seat to accept an appointment. He was defeated by Walter Reed when he ran for reelection to the Quebec assembly in 1908.

Gauthier was defeated when he ran for reelection to the House of Commons in 1921 and was also unsuccessful in federal elections held in 1921, 1925, 1926 and 1930 and in a Quebec election held in 1927. Gauthier was married twice: to Marie-Amazilie Morency in 1893 and to Marie-Anne Desmarais in 1901. He died in Montreal at the age of 72 and was buried in the Notre Dame des Neiges Cemetery.
