= Banque de Saint-Hyacinthe =

Canadian bank

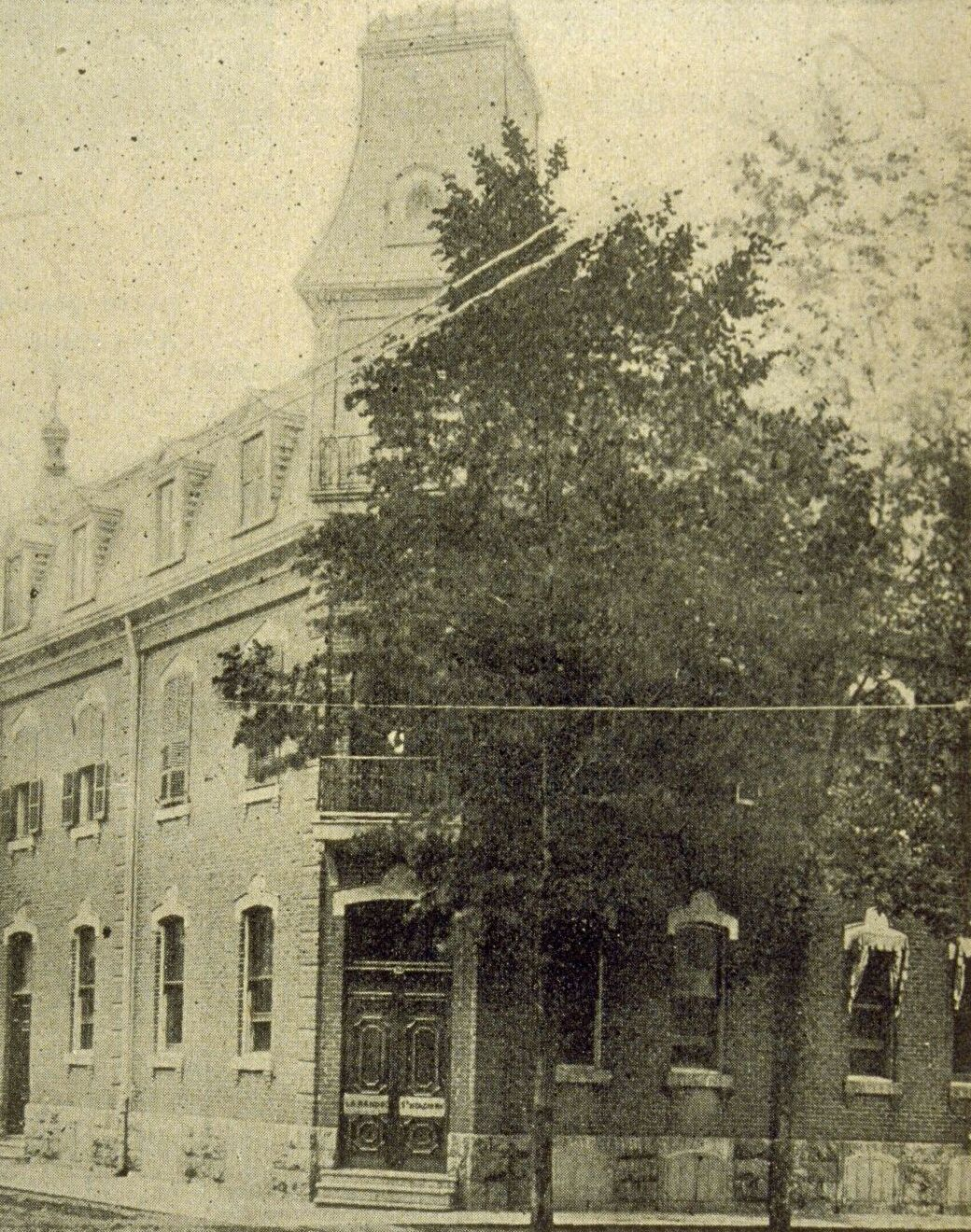
- Industry: Banking
- Founded: 1874
- Defunct: 1908
- Fate: Liquidated
- Headquarters: Saint-Hyacinthe, Canada
- Products: Banking services, loans

The Banque de St-Hyacinthe (lit. 'Bank of St-Hyacinthe') was a Canadian bank based in Saint-Hyacinthe, Quebec. It was active from 1874 until 1908. It was a French Canadian bank.

== History ==
=== Context (1840–1873) ===
Despite Saint-Hyacinthe emerging as a market town and the St-Lawrence and Atlantic Railway passing through the city, Saint-Hyacinthe experienced limited growth in the mid 19th century. This lack of growth was blamed on the city's lack of financial institutions. Farmers started calling for the establishment of a bank, and starting in 1856, the local press circulated the idea of opening a bank with its head office in Saint-Hyacinthe. Early attempts by local merchants and manufacturers to obtain a bank branch failed.

A public assembly was held to launch the incorporation of the Banque de Saint-Hyacinthe during the city's economic expansion in the early 1870s. However, the required capital could not be gathered quickly enough, and the Merchants' Bank opened a branch in the city weeks after the assembly to avoid losing a market. The opening of the branch led to doubt about the Banque of Saint-Hyacinthe's chances of success, and in 1872 a financial institution with a more limited mandate, the Société Permanente de Construction d'Yamaska, was founded.

=== Foundation and expansion (1873–1895) ===
After petitioning by ten men, the Banque de St-Hyacinthe received a charter on 23 May 1873. Most of these petitioners were local francophone businessmen. They included Georges-Casimir Dessaulles and Romuald St-Jacques.

The legally required paid-in capital was obtained by December 1873. The bank started with $500,000 in paid-in capital obtained from nearly 500 individuals, almost half farmers and practically all of whom lived or had lived in Saint-Hyacinthe or the surrounding region. Around a quarter of the bank's stock was held by Dessaulles and his close associates, who composed the first board of director and dominated the bank. Romuald St-Jacques' private banking firm R. St-Jacques et Compagnie formed the basis of the new bank.

The Banque de Saint-Hyacinthe was authorized to begin operation on 13 January 1874, and opened on 27 January 1874.

As Saint-Hyacinthe's economy flourished in the last quarter of the 19th century, so did its bank. The bank helped finance local industrial projects such as the Compagnie Manufacturière de St-Hyacinthe, Granite Mills and the Séguin-Lalime shoe factory. The bank made high profits and paid out high dividends, and by 1898, it had a reserve fund of $75,000.

The bank initially collected savings deposits conservatively. However, as the Banque de Saint-Hyacinthe came to lack funds, its directors were reluctant to bolster the bank's coffers with their own money. They instead obtained saving deposits from new branches, and by its suspension, the bank's saving deposits totaled $1,000,000.

Between 1884 and 1894, the Banque de Saint-Hyacinthe opened branches in six towns; in Saint-Césaire (1884, 1890–1908), Farnham (1889–1908), Saint-François-de-Beauce (1890–1893), Iberville (1893–1908), Saint-Guillaume d’Upton (1893–1894) and L’Assomption (1894–1908). The bank's branch in St-Césaire was notably successful, having $180,000 in deposits and only $40,000 in loans.

=== Decline and closure (1895–1908) ===
The mid-1890s were marked by the economic downturn of both Saint-Hyacinthe and its bank. Many were cut-down or closed, including the Séguin-Lalime shoe factory and Granite Mills. The bank's directors had no connection outside of the region and its French-speakers, and when the local industry declined, there were no opportunities to find other good investments or new sources of capital.

The bank's last decade of operations was troubled. Its assets were immobilized by the Granite Mills and United Counties Railway account. Its profits fell from 10,5% of its paid capital in 1898 to 5,9% in 1903 and 3,3% in 1907. No funds were added to its reserve, and no dividend was paid after 1903. During this period, the bank opened only one branch, in Drummondville, in 1902 (lasting until 1908).

Granite Mills, which owed $300,000 to the Banque of Saint-Hyacinthe, was bought by the Canadian Woollen Mills after shutting down in 1899. Its debts to the bank were reorganized, with $54,000 being paid in cash and the rest in stocks and bonds of the new firm. After a series of events, the Banque de Saint-Hyacinthe was ultimately left with barely $50,000 from its $300,000 investments in Granite Mills. The Banque de Saint-Hyacinthe had also loaned $500,000 to the United Counties Railway, a sum described as "more than could be supported by its capital". The bank pushed for sale of the railway to a solvent operator, which was acquired by the Bank of Saint-Hyacinthe in 1900, to ultimately be sold to an American syndicate for $500,000 in cash and bonds. The railway was sold and became part of the Quebec Southern Railway, only to be again sold in 1908. The Banque de Saint-Hyacinthe's claim of $600,000 on the company was recognized in court, with $100,000 to be paid now and the rest later. Of the remaining $500,000, only $381,000 was ever paid, in two payments to the Banque de Saint-Hyacinthe's liquidators in 1911 and 1913.

In 1903, the Banque de Saint-Hyacinthe was warned by the Canadian Bankers Association (CBA) for its lack of liquid assets. In response, the bank rediscounted its notes with Eastern Township Bank.

Despite differences in the banks' manners of operation, the Banque de Saint-Hyacinthe was associated with another regional bank, the Banque Saint-Jean, in the public's mind. Within two months of the Banque Saint-Jean's suspension, the Banque of Saint-Hyacinthe lost $100,000 in savings deposits. The CBA's secretary John Knight met the bank's cashier L. F. Phillie and recommended suspension of payment. Knight intimidated reluctant directors into compliance by threatening to tell the Minister of Finance that the bank was insolvent if it did not close on its own. The bank finally closed its doors on 24 June 1908 and was liquidated over the following years.

On a 22 September 1908 meeting of depositors and creditors, the bank was given nine months to reimburse depositors. However, the bank failed to sell its assets within this time frame and the bank was instead liquidated on court order. The double liability of shareholders was invoked and depositors were repaid in full, and even with some interest. The last payment was on 22 March 1913.

During the 1913 parliamentary hearings for the revision of the Bank Act, the deputy for Chambly-Verchères Joseph Hormisdas Rainville alleged that the Canadian Bankers association's president, Edward Clouston, wanted the still viable Banque of Saint-Hyacinthe closed so that the Bank of Montreal, of which Clouston was also president, could move into Saint-Hyacinthe. This accusation was supported by credible evidence, and the suspicious nature of the bank's closure was acknowledged in private by the then president of the CBA, D.P Wilkie.

== Presidents ==
1874–1878 Pierre Bachand

1878–1908 Georges-Casimir Dessaulles
