= Honoré Mercier =

9th Premier of Quebec (1887–1891)

The Honourable Honoré Mercier
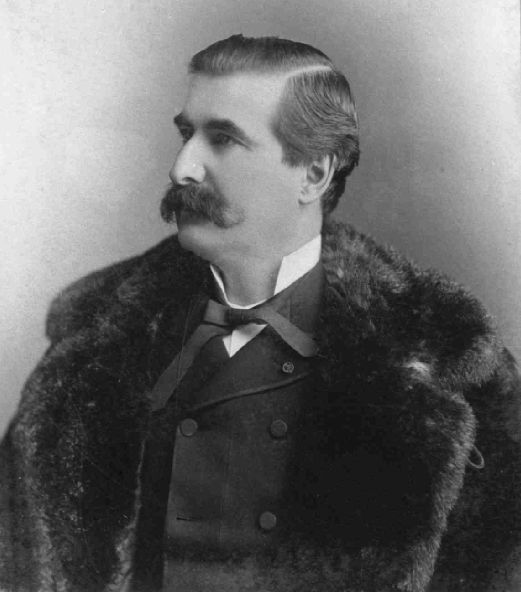

9th Premier of Quebec
- In office January 27, 1887 – December 21, 1891
- Monarch: Victoria
- Lieutenant Governor: Louis-Rodrigue Masson; Auguste-Réal Angers
- Preceded by: Louis-Olivier Taillon
- Succeeded by: Charles Boucher de Boucherville

Member of Parliament for Rouville
- In office October 12, 1872 – January 22, 1874
- Preceded by: Guillaume Cheval dit St-Jacques
- Succeeded by: Guillaume Cheval dit St-Jacques

MNA for Saint-Hyacinthe
- In office June 3, 1879 – June 17, 1890
- Preceded by: Pierre Bachand
- Succeeded by: Odilon Desmarais

MNA for Bonaventure
- In office June 17, 1890 – October 30, 1894
- Preceded by: Henri-Josué Martin
- Succeeded by: François-Xavier Lemieux

Personal details
- Born: October 15, 1840 Saint-Athanase, Lower Canada
- Died: October 30, 1894 (aged 54) Montreal, Quebec, Canada
- Party: Liberal Party / Parti National
- Spouse(s): Léopoldine Boivin (death); Virginie Saint-Denis
- Education: Jesuit College Sainte-Marie
- Occupation: Lawyer, newspaper editor
- Profession: politician

Honoré Mercier (October 15, 1840 – October 30, 1894) was a Canadian lawyer, journalist and politician in Quebec. He was the ninth premier of Quebec from January 27, 1887, to December 21, 1891, as leader of the Parti National or Quebec Liberal Party (PLQ). He rose to power by mobilizing the Francophone opposition to the execution of Louis Riel, denouncing it as a betrayal by John A. Macdonald's Conservative government.

== Early background ==
Mercier was born in Saint-Athanase, Lower Canada to farmer Jean-Baptiste Mercier and Marie Kimener. Mercier is descended from Julien Mercier (1621-1676) who arrived from Tourouvre, France in 1647. Mercier studied at the Jesuit College Sainte-Marie in Montreal, and was called to the Bar of Quebec in April 1865. As the age of 22, Mercier became the editor of Le Courrier de St-Hyacinthe newspaper. He opposed the Confederation project as early as 1864, believing that it would be detrimental to French Canadians.

== Member of Parliament ==
In 1871, he was instrumental in creating the short-lived Parti National. Mercier successfully ran as a Liberal candidate in the 1872 election. He became Member of the House of Commons for the district of Rouville. He did not run for re-election in the 1874 election. In the 1878 election, Mercier was candidate in the district of St. Hyacinthe. He was defeated by the Louis Tellier, his Conservative opponent.

== Provincial politics ==
In 1879, Mercier was appointed Solicitor General of Quebec in the Cabinet of Premier Henri-Gustave Joly de Lotbinière and served in that position for less than a year. He won a by-election and became Member of the Legislative Assembly for the district of Saint-Hyacinthe. He was re-elected in the 1881 and 1886 elections and won another by-election in 1887.

He left an impact on a later leader, Henri Bourassa.

== Party leader ==
He became the leader of the PLQ in 1883. A practising lawyer, from 1885 to 1887 he was President of the Bar of Montreal. He strongly opposed the execution of Louis Riel in 1885; this event helped him win popular support, and the Quebec Conservative Party lost support because its federal counterparts had ordered Riel's execution.

Seizing the opportunity to build a coalition with dissident Conservatives, Mercier revived the "Parti National" name for the 1886 Quebec provincial election, and won a majority of seats. However, the coalition consisted of mostly Liberals and only a few Conservatives, so the "Liberal" name was soon reinstituted. The Conservatives, reduced to a minority in the Legislative Assembly, clung to power for a few more months, but Mercier became Premier of Quebec in 1887.

== Premier of Quebec ==
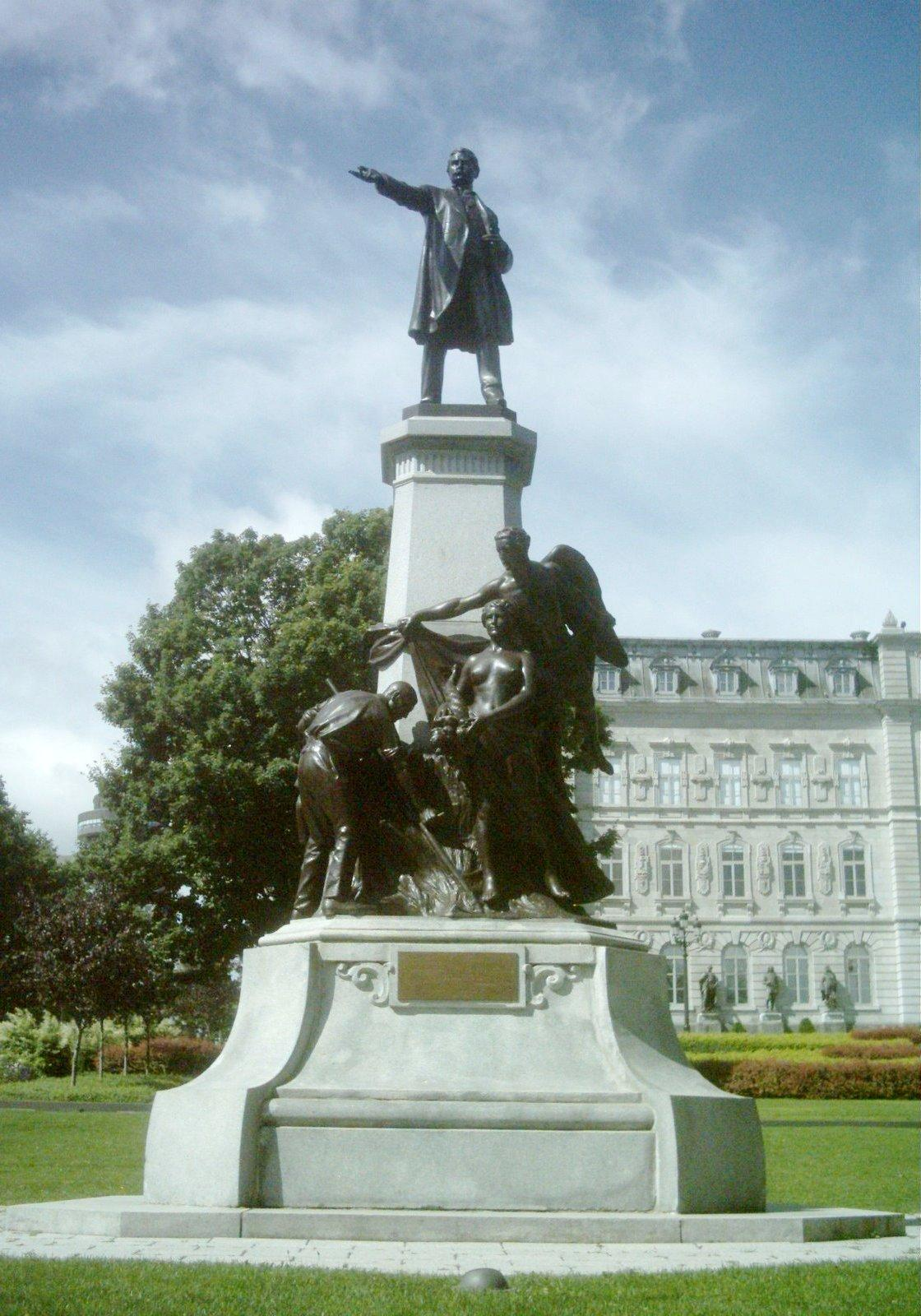
Paul Chevré's Honoré Mercier sculpture in front of Parliament Building (Quebec)

Seeing provincial autonomy as the political expression of Quebec nationalism, he collaborated with Ontario Premier Oliver Mowat to roll back federal centralism. Mercier initiated the idea of interprovincial conferences in 1887. He was the first Quebec premier to defend the principle of provincial autonomy within the confederation, campaigning to abolish the federal government's claimed right to veto provincial legislation.

With his strong nationalist stance, Mercier was very much a precursor of later nationalist premiers in future decades who confronted the federal government and tried to win more power for Quebec. He promoted contacts with Francophones in other parts of North America outside of Quebec including Western Canada and New England. Those francophones had not yet been assimilated into the English-Canadian or American culture to the extent they would be in the future. Mercier promoted reform, economic development, Catholicism, and the French language. He won popularity but also made enemies. He was returned to the legislature as the Member for the district of Bonaventure and his party won the 1890 election with an increased majority. In 1891, he was created a count by the Pope.

== Political downfall ==
On December 16, 1891, he was dismissed by Lieutenant Governor Auguste-Réal Angers after a report concluded that his government had diverted public funds. He lost the 1892 election, and gave up the party leadership to Félix-Gabriel Marchand. He was brought to trial later that year and found not guilty when a second report concluded differently on the matter. However, his health had greatly deteriorated and his political career was over. He died in 1894 at the age of 54, and was interred in the Notre Dame des Neiges Cemetery in Montreal, Quebec.

== Legacy ==
The following landmarks were named to honour Honoré Mercier:

- The Mercier Bridge that links the western part of the Island of Montreal with the South Shore;
- The town of Mercier, Quebec;
- Avenue Mercier, located in downtown Shawinigan, Quebec, Canada;
- The provincial electoral district of Mercier;
- An elementary school named Honoré-Mercier in Montreal;
- A high school named Honoré-Mercier in Montreal;
- A hospital in Saint-Hyacinthe, Québec named Hôpital Honoré-Mercier;
- Avenue Honoré-Mercier, located in the Quebec City centre;
- The borough of Mercier–Hochelaga-Maisonneuve and its contained district of Mercier in Montreal.

== Family ==
His son Honoré Mercier fils was a multi-term member of the Legislative Assembly of Quebec and a Cabinet Minister; his grandson Honoré Mercier III served one term in the Legislative Assembly.

Mercier was Lomer Gouin's father-in-law and is a great-great-grandfather of NDP retired leader Thomas Mulcair.

== Electoral record ==
1872 Canadian federal election: Rouville
Party	Candidate	Votes
Liberal	Honoré Mercier	1,033
Liberal	Guillaume Cheval, Alias Saint-Jacques	977
Source: Canadian Elections Database

1878 Canadian federal election: St. Hyacinthe
Party	Candidate	Votes
Conservative	Louis Tellier	1,181
Liberal	Honoré Mercier	1,175

== See also ==
- Politics of Quebec
- History of Quebec
- Quebec general elections

== Archives ==
There is a Honoré Mercier fonds at Library and Archives Canada. There are also two fonds at Bibliothèque et Archives nationales du Québec.

Political offices
Preceded by Alexandre Chauveau (Liberal)	Solicitor General; 1879–1879	Succeeded by William Warren Lynch (Conservative)
Preceded by Louis-Olivier Taillon (Conservative)	Attorney General; 1887–1888	Succeeded by Arthur Turcotte (Conservative)
Preceded by Henri-Gustave Joly de Lotbinière (Liberal)	Leader of the Official Opposition; 1883–1887	Succeeded by Louis-Olivier Taillon (Conservative)
