= Canadian federal election results in Central Quebec =

Seats obtained by party (since 1968)

Liberal
Conservative
New Democratic
Bloc Québécois
Social Credit (defunct)
Progressive Conservative (defunct)
Independents

Seats obtained by party (1867–1965)
Year	Results
1965	
1963	
1962	
1958	
1957	
1953	
1949	
1945	
1940	
1935	
1930	
1926	
1925	

The last Canadian federal elections were held in 2025. Prime Minister Mark Carney’s Liberal Party is set to form the minority government after the elections in April 2025.

Following are the results in Central Quebec.

== Regional profile ==
This area was one of the power bases for the Bloc Québécois for two decades. In fact, before 2011, the BQ won at least seven of its nine seats in each of the preceding four elections, losing Saint-Maurice (Jean Chrétien's old riding) in 1993, 1997 and 2000 and Portneuf in 2000, which both went Liberal. They swept all nine ridings in 2004, and in 2006 and 2008 lost only Lotbinière—Chutes-de-la-Chaudière to the Conservatives and Portneuf-Jacques-Cartier to independent candidate André Arthur.

Before the rise of Mulroney in 1984, this area was traditionally Liberal, except for Joliette (the only riding in Quebec that voted anything other than Liberal in 1980), and Lotbinière (which voted Social Credit in 1979). Mulroney's Conservatives swept the area in 1988, and 1984 (except for Chrétien's seat).

The 2011 NDP surge saw New Democrats sweeping all but two seats in the region, with the Conservatives and Bloc Québécois holding one each. In 2015, Bloc Québécois rebounded to take three more ridings, while the Liberals regained Saint-Maurice—Champlain. Bloc Québécois continued to regain its place in 2019, taking out the NDP.

=== Votes by party throughout time ===
Election	Liberal	Bloc Québécois	New Democratic	Conservative	Green	PC	Reform / Alliance	Social Credit	Others
1979	180,520; 54.6%	—	10,132; 3.1%	—	—	65,566; 19.8%	—	57,091; 17.3%	17,125; 5.2%
1980	201,928; 63.1%	—	26,657; 8.3%	—	—	71,297; 22.3%	—	9,698; 3.0%	10,656; 3.3%
1984	122,290; 33.3%	—	17,039; 4.6%	—	No candidate	213,934; 58.2%	—	—	14,366; 3.9%
1988	85,664; 23.0%	—	56,877; 15.3%	—	7,877; 2.1%	217,759; 58.6%	—	—	3,482; 0.9%
1993	108,810; 26.9%	227,065; 56.0%	4,073; 1.0%	—	No candidate	58,660; 14.5%	No candidate	—	6,567; 1.6%
1997	122,570; 27.8%	209,318; 47.5%	6,661; 1.5%	—	No candidate	98,838; 22.4%	No candidate	—	3,085; 0.7%
2000	155,704; 37.3%	204,599; 49.1%	5,241; 1.3%	—	No candidate	18,548; 4.4%	26,072; 6.3%	—	6,887; 1.7%
2004	98,817; 23.2%	252,754; 59.3%	13,852; 3.3%	46,035; 10.8%	12,259; 2.9%	Merged into Conservative Party		—	2,367; 0.6%
2006	42,969; 9.2%	224,855; 48.0%	29,358; 6.3%	134,839; 28.8%	15,929; 3.4%	Merged into Conservative Party		—	20,529; 4.4%
2008	75,510; 16.1%	214,273; 45.8%	53,143; 11.3%	93,362; 20.1%	14,952; 3.2%	Merged into Conservative Party		—	16,102; 3.4%
2011	40,576; 8.2%	138,443; 27.8%	223,402; 44.9%	66,743; 13.4%	12,486; 2.5%	Merged into Conservative Party		—	15,569; 3.1%
2015	141,558; 26.9%	131,178; 25.0%	131,007; 24.9%	108,824; 20.7%	10,078; 1.9%	Merged into Conservative Party		—	2,858; 0.5%
2019	121,949; 22.8%	219,889; 41.2%	54,311; 10.2%	110,431; 20.7%	17,270; 3.2%	Merged into Conservative Party		—	9,917; 1.9%
2021	116,185; 22.5%	199,222; 38.7%	47,003; 9.1%	124,644; 24.2%	6,102; 1.2%	Merged into Conservative Party		—	22,217; 4.4%
2025	182,803; 33.2%	183,663; 33.3%	24,704; 4.5%	151,228; 27.5%	4,311; 0.8%	Merged into Conservative Party		—	4,154; 0.7%

Liberal
Conservative
New Democratic
Bloc Québécois
Green
Social Credit (defunct)
Alliance (defunct)
Progressive Conservative (defunct)

== Detailed results ==
=== 2019 ===
Electoral district	Candidates							Incumbent
Electoral district	Liberal	Conservative	BQ	NDP	Green	PPC	Other	Incumbent
Bécancour—Nicolet—Saurel	Nathalie Rochefort; 9,332; 17.83%	Pierre-André Émond; 8,434; 16.11%	Louis Plamondon; 29,653; 56.66%	Carole Lennard; 2,732; 5.22%	David Turcotte; 1,697; 3.24%	Richard Synnott; 489; 0.93%		Louis Plamondon
Berthier—Maskinongé	Christine Poirier; 7,796; 13.83%	Josée Bélanger; 5,812; 10.31%	Yves Perron; 21,200; 37.62%	Ruth Ellen Brosseau; 19,698; 34.95%	Éric Laferrière; 1,008; 1.79%	Luc Massé; 428; 0.76%	Alain Bélanger (Ind.); 154; 0.27% Martin Acetaria Caesar Jubinville (Rhino.); 151; 0.27% Danny Légaré (Mar.); 107; 0.19%	Ruth Ellen Brosseau
Joliette	Michel Bourgeois; 12,995; 22.52%	Jean-Martin Masse; 5,176; 8.97%	Gabriel Ste-Marie; 33,590; 58.22%	Julienne Soumaoro; 2,623; 4.55%	Érica Poirier; 2,343; 4.06%	Sylvain Prescott; 498; 0.86%	Paul Savard (PIQ); 474; 0.82%	Gabriel Ste-Marie
Lévis—Lotbinière	Ghislain Daigle; 10,761; 16.95%	Jacques Gourde; 28,297; 44.57%	François-Noël Brault; 15,921; 25.08%	Christel Marchand; 4,355; 6.86%	Patrick Kerr; 1,908; 3.01%	Marc Fontaine; 2,247; 3.54%		Jacques Gourde
Montcalm	Isabel Sayegh; 11,200; 20.44%	Gisèle Desroches; 4,942; 9.02%	Luc Thériault; 31,791; 58.01%	Julian Bonello-Stauch; 3,514; 6.41%	Mathieu Goyette; 2,416; 4.41%	Hugo Clénin; 524; 0.96%	Marc Labelle (PIQ); 419; 0.76%	Luc Thériault
Portneuf—Jacques-Cartier	Annie Talbot; 12,876; 19.91%	Joël Godin; 28,110; 43.46%	Mathieu Bonsaint; 15,707; 24.29%	David-Roger Gagnon; 3,758; 5.81%	Marie-Claude Gaudet; 2,308; 3.57%	Luca Abbatiello; 1,915; 2.96%		Joël Godin
Repentigny	Josée Larose; 18,111; 27.67%	Pierre Branchaud; 4,878; 7.45%	Monique Pauzé; 34,837; 53.22%	Meryem Benslimane; 4,470; 6.83%	Diane Beauregard; 2,289; 3.50%	Samuel Saint-Laurent; 524; 0.80%	Micheline Boucher Granger (PIQ); 347; 0.53%	Monique Pauzé
Saint-Maurice—Champlain	François-Philippe Champagne; 23,104; 39.55%	Bruno-Pier Courchesne; 9,542; 16.34%	Nicole Morin; 19,950; 34.15%	Barthélémy Boisguérin; 3,071; 5.26%	Stéphanie Dufresne; 1,809; 3.10%	Julie Déziel; 938; 1.61%		François-Philippe Champagne
Trois-Rivières	Valérie Renaud-Martin; 15,774; 26.06%	Yves Lévesque; 15,240; 25.17%	Louise Charbonneau; 17,240; 28.48%	Robert Aubin; 10,090; 16.67%	Marie Duplessis; 1,492; 2.46%	Marc André Gingras; 565; 0.93%	Ronald St-Onge Lynch (Ind.); 137; 0.23%	Robert Aubin

=== 2015 ===
Electoral district	Candidates						Incumbent
Electoral district	Conservative	NDP	Liberal	BQ	Green	Other	Incumbent
Bécancour—Nicolet—Saurel	Yves Laberge; 5,955; 11.41%	Nicolas Tabah; 11,531; 22.09%	Claude Carpentier; 12,666; 24.26%	Louis Plamondon; 20,871; 39.98%	Corina Bastiani; 1,182; 2.26%		Louis Plamondon; Bas-Richelieu—Nicolet—Bécancour
Berthier—Maskinongé	Marianne Foucrault; 5,548; 10.20%	Ruth Ellen Brosseau; 22,942; 42.17%	Pierre Destrempes; 11,032; 20.28%	Yves Perron; 14,037; 25.80%	Cate Burton; 847; 1.56%		Ruth Ellen Brosseau
Joliette	Soheil Eid; 5,705; 10.06%	Danielle Landreville; 14,566; 25.69%	Michel Bourgeois; 15,995; 28.22%	Gabriel Ste-Marie; 18,875; 33.30%	Mathieu Morin; 1,335; 2.35%	Robert D. Morais (SD); 213; 0.38%	Francine Raynault§
Lévis—Lotbinière	Jacques Gourde; 31,357; 50.10%	Hélène Bilodeau; 9,246; 14.77%	Claude Boucher; 13,562; 21.67%	Steve Gagné; 7,163; 11.44%	Tina Biello; 1,124; 1.80%	François Belanger (AOTN); 136; 0.22%	Jacques Gourde; Lotbinière—Chutes-de-la-Chaudière
Montcalm	Gisèle DesRoches; 5,093; 9.61%	Martin Leclerc; 12,431; 23.45%	Louis-Charles Thouin; 14,484; 27.32%	Luc Thériault; 19,405; 36.61%	Yumi Yow Mei Ang; 976; 1.84%	Manon Perreault (SD); 620; 1.17%	Manon Perreault (Note: Perreault sat as an independent at dissolution then joined Strength in Democracy after writ was dropped.)
Portneuf—Jacques-Cartier	Joël Godin; 27,290; 43.97%	Élaine Michaud; 13,686; 22.05%	David Gauvin; 13,322; 21.47%	Raymond Harvey; 6,665; 10.74%	Johanne Morin; 1,096; 1.77%		Élaine Michaud
Repentigny	Jonathan Lefebvre; 7,053; 10.82%	Réjean Bellemare; 15,167; 23.26%	Adriana Dudas; 17,798; 27.29%	Monique Pauzé; 22,618; 34.68%	Yoland Gilbert; 1,242; 1.90%	Johnathan Cloutier (SD); 1,333; 2.04%	Jean-François Larose‡
Saint-Maurice—Champlain	Jacques Grenier; 9,592; 16.27%	Jean-Yves Tremblay; 12,245; 20.77%	François-Philippe Champagne; 24,475; 41.52%	Sacki Carignan Deschamps; 11,295; 19.16%	Martial Toupin; 1,144; 1.94%	Jean-Paul Bédard (M-L); 196; 0.33%	Lise St-Denis†
Trois-Rivières	Dominic Therrien; 11,231; 18.63%	Robert Aubin; 19,193; 31.83%	Yvon Boivin; 18,224; 30.23%	André Valois; 10,249; 17.00%	Éric Trottier; 1,032; 1.71%	Maxime Rousseau (Libert.); 360; 0.60%	Robert Aubin

=== 2011 ===
Electoral district	Candidates						Incumbent
Electoral district	BQ	Conservative	Liberal	NDP	Green	Other	Incumbent
Bas-Richelieu—Nicolet— Bécancour	Louis Plamondon; 19,046; 38.30%	Charles Cartier; 6,478; 13.03%	Rhéal Blais; 5,024; 10.10%	Krista Lalonde; 17,705; 35.60%	Anne-Marie Tanguay; 1,479; 2.97%		Louis Plamondon
Berthier—Maskinongé	Guy André; 16,668; 29.45%	Marie-Claude Godue; 7,904; 13.96%	Francine Gaudet; 8,060; 14.24%	Ruth Ellen Brosseau; 22,403; 39.58%	Léonie Matteau; 1,196; 2.11%	Martin Jubinville (Rhino); 373; 0.66%	Guy André
Joliette	Pierre A. Paquette; 18,804; 32.90%	Michel Morand; 5,525; 9.67%	François Boucher; 3,545; 6.20%	Francine Raynault; 27,050; 47.33%	Annie Durette; 2,227; 3.90%		Pierre Paquette
Lotbinière— Chutes-de-la-Chaudière	Gaston Gourde; 8,381; 14.88%	Jacques Gourde; 22,460; 39.88%	Nicole Larouche; 2,866; 5.09%	Tanya Fredette; 21,683; 38.50%	Richard Domm; 936; 1.66%		Jacques Gourde
Montcalm	Roger Gaudet; 19,609; 30.16%	Jason Fuoco; 5,118; 7.87%	Yves Dufour; 3,501; 5.39%	Manon Perreault; 34,434; 52.97%	Marianne Girard; 2,347; 3.61%		Roger Gaudet
Portneuf—Jacques-Cartier	Richard Côté; 10,745; 20.48%	—	Réjean Thériault; 3,463; 6.60%	Élaine Michaud; 22,387; 42.67%	Claudine Delorme; 1,279; 2.44%	André Arthur (Ind.); 14,594; 27.82%	André Arthur
Repentigny	Nicolas Dufour; 19,242; 31.09%	Christophe Royer; 4,606; 7.44%	Chantal Perreault; 4,830; 7.80%	Jean-François Larose; 32,131; 51.92%	Michel Duchaine; 1,078; 1.74%		Nicolas Dufour
Saint-Maurice—Champlain	Jean-Yves Laforest; 13,961; 29.28%	Jacques Grenier; 8,447; 17.72%	Yves Tousignant; 5,670; 11.89%	Lise St-Denis; 18,628; 39.07%	Pierre Audette; 972; 2.04%		Jean-Yves Laforest
Trois-Rivières	Paule Brunelle; 11,987; 23.80%	Pierre Lacroix; 6,205; 12.32%	Patrice Mangin; 3,617; 7.18%	Robert Aubin; 26,981; 53.57%	Louis Lacroix; 972; 1.93%	Francis Arsenault (Rhino); 256 0.51%	Paule Brunelle
Trois-Rivières	Paule Brunelle; 11,987; 23.80%	Pierre Lacroix; 6,205; 12.32%	Patrice Mangin; 3,617; 7.18%	Robert Aubin; 26,981; 53.57%	Louis Lacroix; 972; 1.93%	Marc-André Fortin (Ind.); 346 0.69%	Paule Brunelle

=== 2008 ===
Electoral district	Candidates						Incumbent
Electoral district	BQ	Conservative	Liberal	NDP	Green	Independent	Incumbent
Bas-Richelieu—Nicolet—Bécancour	Louis Plamondon; 26,821; 54.67%	Réjean Bériault; 8,904; 18.15%	Ghislaine Cournoyer; 7,987; 16.28%	Nourredine Seddiki; 4,010; 8.17%	Rebecca Laplante; 1,334; 2.72%		Louis Plamondon
Berthier—Maskinongé	Guy André; 24,945; 45.83%	Marie-Claude Godue; 12,078; 22.19%	Jean-Luc Matteau; 10,035; 18.44%	André Chauvette; 5,684; 10.44%	Denis Lefebvre; 1,691; 3.11%		Guy André
Joliette	Pierre Paquette; 28,040; 52.40%	Sylvie Lavallée; 9,540; 17.83%	Suzie St-Onge; 7,769; 14.52%	Francine Raynault; 5,579; 10.42%	Annie Durette; 2,588; 4.84%		Pierre Paquette
Lotbinière—Chutes-de-la-Chaudière	Antoine Sarrazin-Bourgoin; 12,738; 24.58%	Jacques Gourde; 24,495; 47.27%	Marie-Thérèse Hovington; 6,498; 12.54%	Raymond Côté; 6,828; 13.18%	Shirley Picknell; 1,265; 2.44%		Jacques Gourde
Montcalm	Roger Gaudet; 33,519; 55.69%	Claude Marc Boudreau; 8,096; 13.45%	David Grégoire; 8,387; 13.93%	Marie-Josée Beauchamp; 8,337; 13.85%	Michel Paulette; 1,854; 3.08%		Roger Gaudet
Portneuf—Jacques-Cartier	Richard Côté; 14,401; 32.02%		Stéphane Asselin; 7,320; 16.27%	André Turgeon; 5,707; 12.69%	Nathan John Weatherdon; 1,452; 3.23%	André Arthur; 15,063 33.49%	André Arthur
Portneuf—Jacques-Cartier	Richard Côté; 14,401; 32.02%		Stéphane Asselin; 7,320; 16.27%	André Turgeon; 5,707; 12.69%	Nathan John Weatherdon; 1,452; 3.23%	Jean Paradis; 1,039 2.31%	André Arthur
Repentigny	Nicolas Dufour; 31,007; 53.05%	Bruno Royer; 8,168; 13.98%	Robert Semegen; 8,751; 14.97%	Réjean Bellemare; 8,853; 15.15%	Paul W. Fournier; 1,666; 2.85%		Raymond Gravel†
Saint-Maurice—Champlain	Jean-Yves Laforest; 20,397; 43.96%	Stéphane Roof; 11,083; 23.89%	Ronald St-Onge Lynch; 9,755; 21.02%	Anne-Marie Aubert; 3,601; 7.76%	Martial Toupin; 1,562; 3.37%		Jean-Yves Laforest
Trois-Rivières	Paule Brunelle; 22,405; 45.27%	Claude Durand; 11,998; 24.24%	Marcos G. Simard; 9,008; 18.20%	Geneviève Boivin; 4,544; 9.18%	Ariane Blais; 1,540; 3.11%		Paule Brunelle

=== 2006 ===
Electoral district	Candidates						Incumbent
Electoral district	BQ	Liberal	Conservative	NDP	Green	Other	Incumbent
Bas-Richelieu—Nicolet—Bécancour	Louis Plamondon; 27,742; 55.92%	Ghislaine Provencher; 6,438; 12.98%	Marie-Ève Hélie-Lambert; 11,588; 23.36%	Marie-Claude Roberge Cartier; 2,248; 4.53%	Louis Lacroix; 1,595; 3.22%		Louis Plamondon; Richelieu
Berthier—Maskinongé	Guy André; 26,191; 48.50%	Serge Lafrenière; 5,605; 10.38%	Marie-Claude Godue; 16,958; 31.40%	Anne-Marie Aubert; 3,319; 6.15%	Nathalie Gratton; 1,925; 3.56%		Guy André
Joliette	Pierre A. Paquette; 28,630; 54.12%	Gérard Leclerc; 5,245; 9.92%	Sylvie Lavallée; 14,192; 26.83%	Jacques Trudeau; 2,745; 5.19%	Jean-François Lévêque; 2,086; 3.94%		Pierre Paquette
Lotbinière—Chutes-de-la-Chaudière	Odina Desrochers; 15,402; 29.64%	Eric Paradis; 2,820; 5.43%	Jacques Gourde; 28,236; 54.34%	Raymond Côté; 3,529; 6.79%	Shirley Picknell; 1,978; 3.81%		Odina Desrochers
Montcalm	Roger Gaudet; 34,975; 62.28%	Luc Fortin; 4,645; 8.27%	Michel Paulette; 10,818; 19.26%	Nancy Leclerc; 3,766; 6.71%	Wendy Gorchinsky; 1,954; 3.48%		Roger Gaudet
Portneuf—Jacques-Cartier	Guy Côté; 13,094; 25.88%	Gilles Landry; 2,489; 4.92%	Howard M. Bruce; 11,472; 22.67%	Jean-Marie Fiset; 1,956; 3.87%	Jérôme Beaulieu; 1,431; 2.83%	André Arthur (Ind.); 20,158; 39.84%	Guy Côté; Portneuf
Repentigny	Benoît Sauvageau; 34,958; 62.42%	Josyanne Forest; 4,847; 8.65%	Claude Jr Lafortune; 10,124; 18.08%	Réjean Bellemare; 4,337; 7.74%	Adam Jastrzebski; 1,742; 3.11%		Benoît Sauvageau
Saint-Maurice—Champlain	Jean-Yves Laforest; 21,532; 44.34%	Lucille Whissell; 5,612; 11.56%	Martial Toupin; 16,028; 33.01%	Claude Larocque; 3,684; 7.59%	Pierre Audette; 1,705; 3.51%		Marcel Gagnon†
Trois-Rivières	Paule Brunelle; 22,331; 45.87%	Martine Girard; 5,268; 10.82%	Luc Ménard; 15,423; 31.68%	Geneviève Boivin; 3,774; 7.75%	Linda Lavoie; 1,513; 3.11%	Paul Giroux (Mar.); 371; 0.76%	Paule Brunelle

=== 2004 ===
Electoral district	Candidates						Incumbent
Electoral district	Liberal	BQ	Conservative	NDP	Green	Marijuana	Incumbent
Berthier—Maskinongé	Laurier Thibault; 11,198; 22.79%	Guy André; 29,432; 59.90%	Ann Julie Fortier; 5,535; 11.27%	Denis McKinnon; 1,653; 3.36%	Eric Labrecque; 1,314; 2.67%		New district
Joliette	Jean-François Coderre; 10,975; 22.70%	Pierre A. Paquette; 30,661; 63.42%	Daniel Bouchard; 3,107; 6.43%	Jacques Trudeau; 1,755; 3.63%	Wendy Gorchinsky; 1,147; 2.37%	Marco Geoffroy; 701; 1.45%	Pierre Paquette
Lotbinière—Chutes-de-la-Chaudière	Anicet Gagné; 9,445; 21.45%	Odina Desrochers; 20,245; 45.99%	Jean Landry; 10,628; 24.14%	Jean Bernatchez; 2,091; 4.75%	Rama Borne MacDonald; 1,615; 3.67%		Odina Desrochers; Lotbinière—L'Érable
Montcalm	Daniel Brazeau; 7,915; 16.40%	Roger Gaudet; 34,383; 71.24%	Michel Paulette; 2,831; 5.87%	François Rivest; 1,531; 3.17%	Serge Bellemare; 1,606; 3.33%		Roger Gaudet; Berthier—Montcalm
Portneuf	Claude Duplain; 11,863; 27.56%	Guy Côté; 18,471; 42.91%	Howard M. Bruce; 9,251; 21.49%	Jean-François Breton; 1,540; 3.58%	Pierre Poulin; 1,925; 4.47%		Claude Duplain
Repentigny	Lévis Brien; 9,353; 18.25%	Benoît Sauvageau; 35,907; 70.06%	Allen F. MacKenzie; 2,447; 4.77%	André Cardinal; 1,526; 2.98%	Jean-François Léveque; 1,482; 2.89%	François Boudreau; 539; 1.05%	Benoît Sauvageau
Richelieu	Ghislaine Provencher; 11,045; 22.68%	Louis Plamondon; 31,497; 64.67%	Daniel A. Proulx; 3,726; 7.65%	Charles Bussières; 1,017; 2.09%	Jean-Pierre Bonenfant; 839; 1.72%	Daniel Blackburn; 580; 1.19%	Louis Plamondon; Bas-Richelieu—Nicolet—Bécancour
Saint-Maurice—Champlain	Marie-Eve Bilodeau; 14,320; 30.55%	Marcel Gagnon; 25,918; 55.29%	Martial Toupin; 4,129; 8.81%	Pierre J.C. Allard; 1,104; 2.36%	Pierre Cayou Audette; 855; 1.82%	Paul Giroux; 547; 1.17%	Vacant (Note: Formerly held by Liberal Jean Chrétien.); Saint-Maurice
Saint-Maurice—Champlain	Marie-Eve Bilodeau; 14,320; 30.55%	Marcel Gagnon; 25,918; 55.29%	Martial Toupin; 4,129; 8.81%	Pierre J.C. Allard; 1,104; 2.36%	Pierre Cayou Audette; 855; 1.82%	Paul Giroux; 547; 1.17%	merged district
Saint-Maurice—Champlain	Marie-Eve Bilodeau; 14,320; 30.55%	Marcel Gagnon; 25,918; 55.29%	Martial Toupin; 4,129; 8.81%	Pierre J.C. Allard; 1,104; 2.36%	Pierre Cayou Audette; 855; 1.82%	Paul Giroux; 547; 1.17%	Marcel Gagnon; Champlain
Trois-Rivières	Jean-Éric Guindon; 12,703; 27.36%	Paule Brunelle; 26,240; 56.51%	Jean-Guy Mercier; 4,381; 9.43%	Marc Tessier; 1,635; 3.52%	Linda Lavoie; 1,476; 3.18%		Yves Rocheleau†

==== Maps ====
1. Berthier-Maskinongé
2. Joliette
3. Lotbinière-Chutes-de-la-Chaudière
4. Montcalm
5. Portneuf
6. Repentigny
7. Richelieu
8. Saint-Maurice-Champlain
9. Trois-Rivières
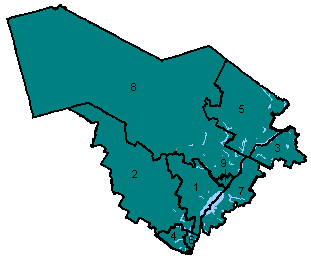
Key map

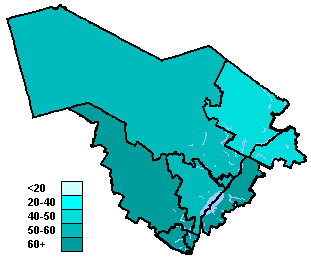
Bloc Québécois

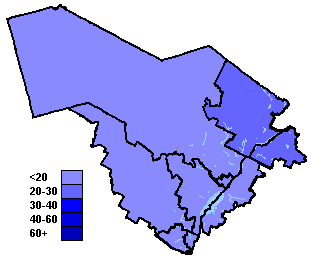
Conservative Party of Canada

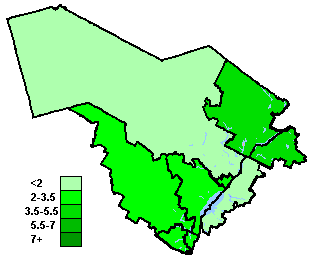
Green Party of Canada

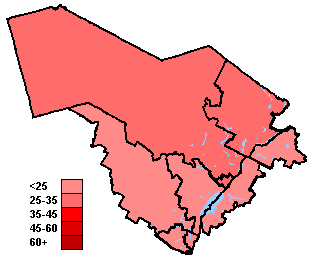
Liberal Party of Canada

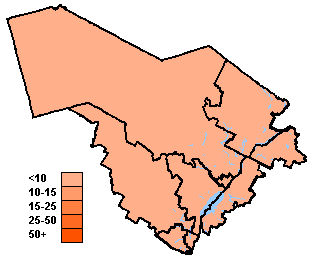
New Democratic Party

=== 2000 ===
Electoral district	Candidates						Incumbent
Electoral district	BQ	Liberal	Canadian Alliance	NDP	PC	Other	Incumbent
Bas-Richelieu—Nicolet—Bécancour	Louis Plamondon; 25,266; 56.92%	Roland Paradis; 13,781; 31.04%	Frédéric Lajoie; 2,078; 4.68%	Raymond Dorion; 421; 0.95%	Gabriel Rousseau; 1,944; 4.38%	Black D. Blackburn (Mar.); 901; 2.03%	Louis Plamondon; Richelieu
Berthier—Montcalm	Michel Bellehumeur; 31,647; 57.06%	Jean-Carle Hudon; 16,669; 30.05%	Réal Naud; 2,851; 5.14%	Jean-Pierre De Billy; 823; 1.48%	Paul Lavigne; 2,011; 3.63%	Sébastien Hénault (Mar.); 1,464; 2.64%	Michel Bellehumeur
Champlain	Marcel Gagnon; 20,423; 45.26%	Julie Boulet; 20,408; 45.23%	Eric Labranche; 2,599; 5.76%	Philippe Toone; 672; 1.49%		Paul Giroux (Mar.); 1,020; 2.26%	Réjean Lefebvre (Note: Réjean Lefebvre left the Bloc Québécois due to drunken driving to sit as an Independent in 1999.)
Joliette	Pierre Paquette; 23,615; 52.20%	Robert Malo; 14,820; 32.76%	Clément Lévesque; 2,432; 5.38%	François Rivest; 1,085; 2.40%	Eric Champagne; 2,730; 6.03%	Bob Aubin (Comm.); 560; 1.24%	René Laurin†
Lotbinière—L'Érable	Odina Desrochers; 15,351; 45.64%	Luc Dastous; 12,563; 37.35%	Pierre Allard; 2,827; 8.40%	Dominique Vaillancourt; 538; 1.60%	Jean Landry; 2,357; 7.01%		Odina Desrochers; Lotbinière
Portneuf	Patrice Dallaire; 15,444; 35.23%	Claude Duplain; 17,877; 40.78%	Howard Bruce; 6,699; 15.28%		François Dion; 3,819; 8.71%		Pierre de Savoye†
Repentigny	Benoît Sauvageau; 33,627; 57.80%	David Veillette; 15,635; 26.88%	Michel Paulette; 2,964; 5.09%	Pierre Péclet; 831; 1.43%	Michel Carignan; 3,122; 5.37%	Lise Dufour (Mar.); 1,997; 3.43%	Benoît Sauvageau
Saint-Maurice	François Marchand; 16,821; 38.96%	Jean Chrétien; 23,345; 54.07%	Jean-Guy Mercier; 1,461; 3.38%	Raymond Chase; 359; 0.83%	Pierre Blais; 966; 2.24%	Sylvain Archambault (Comm.); 223; 0.52%	Jean Chrétien
Trois-Rivières	Yves Rocheleau; 22,405; 46.67%	Denis Normandin; 20,606; 42.92%	Luc Legaré; 2,161; 4.50%	David Horlock; 512; 1.07%	Scott Healy; 1,599; 3.33%	Alexandre Deschênes (M-L); 184 0.38% Gilles Raymond (NLP); 538 1.12%	Yves Rocheleau

=== 1997 ===
Electoral district	Candidates					Incumbent
Electoral district	BQ	Liberal	PC	NDP	Other	Incumbent
Berthier—Montcalm	Michel Bellehumeur; 32,707	Lise Perreault; 15,073	Réal Naud; 13,338	Jean-Pierre de Billy; 1,009		Michel Bellehumeur
Champlain	Réjean Lefebvre; 20,687	Pierre Lesieur; 12,915	Yves St-Amant; 12,784	Petra Genest; 632		Réjean Lefebvre
Joliette	René Laurin; 22,605	Denise Cloutier Bergeron; 7,452	Anie Perrault; 17,417	Jacques Trudeau; 502	Gilles Roy (NL); 594	René Laurin
Lotbinière	Odina Desrochers; 13,069	Pierre Savoie; 10,062	Gaston Beaudet; 9,690	Dominique Vaillancourt; 445	Jean Landry (Ind); 1,988	Jean Landry
Portneuf	Pierre de Savoye; 18,615	Raynald Samson; 12,674	Raymond McBain; 10,587	Majella Desmeules; 1,112		Pierre de Savoye
Repentigny	Benoît Sauvageau; 33,283	Robert Tranchemontagne; 12,495	Michel Carignan; 12,436	Normand Caplette; 916		New district
Richelieu	Louis Plamondon; 26,421	Jocelyn Paul; 13,941	Yves Schelling; 6,827	Sylvain Pelletier; 1,028		Louis Plamondon
Saint-Maurice	Yves Duhaime; 20,664	Jean Chrétien; 22,266	Denis Vincent; 3,657	Eric Hébert; 489		Jean Chrétien
Trois-Rivières	Yves Rocheleau; 21,267	Jean-Guy Doucet; 15,692	Michel Charland; 12,102	Dorothy Hénaut; 528	Roger Périgny (NL); 503	Yves Rocheleau

=== 1993 ===
Electoral district	Candidates					Incumbent
Electoral district	BQ	Liberal	PC	NDP	Other	Incumbent
Richelieu	Louis Plamondon; 31,558	Michel Biron; 10,933	Lorraine Frappier; 4,455	Carl Ethier; 337	Paulo da Silva (PfC); 157	Louis Plamondon (Note: Louis Plamondon was elected as a Progressive-Conservative MP in 1984 and 1988. He left the PC caucus to seat as an independent MP in June 1990 and later joined the Bloc québécois caucus in December 1990.)
Berthier—Montcalm	Michel Bellehumeur; 36,065	Madeleine Bélanger; 16,133	Réal Naud; 5,358	Jean-Pierre de Billy; 591	Réal Croteau (NL); 804; Laurent Harvey (Nat); 276	Robert de Cotret
Champlain	Réjean Lefebvre; 23,646	Michel Veillette; 11,251	Michel Champagne; 13,083	André De Billy; 445		Michel Champagne
Joliette	René Laurin; 41,057	Réjean Lefebvre; 10,344	Gaby Larrivée; 8,776	Gilles De Chantal; 809	Gilles Roy (NL); 1,274	Gaby Larrivée
Lotbinière	Jean Landry; 26,763	Michael Provencher; 14,659	Jacques Le Sieur; 7,387	André-Pierre Robitaille; 714		Maurice Tremblay
Portneuf	Pierre de Savoye; 23,880	Paulin Plamondon; 10,269	Marc Ferland; 6,645	John MacFarlane; 626	René Matte (Ind); 2,260; Robert Royer (NL); 869	Marc Ferland
Saint-Maurice	Claude Rompré; 18,896	Jean Chrétien; 25,200	Pauline B. Daneault; 1,909	Robert Des Champs; 236	Christian Simard (NL); 372	Denis Pronovost (Note: Denis Pronovost was elected as a Progressive-Conservative in 1988 election but left the PC caucus in 1993 to seat as independent.)
Trois-Rivières	Yves Rocheleau; 24,882	Jean-Pierre Caron; 9,937	Pierre H. Vincent; 11,053	Maryse Choquette; 374	Roger Périgny (NL); 552	Pierre H. Vincent

=== 1988 ===
Electoral district	Candidates					Incumbent
Electoral district	PC	Liberal	NDP	Green	Other	Incumbent
Berthier—Montcalm	Robert de Cotret; 29,370	Maurice Roberge; 13,624	Pierre Arès; 5,884	Roberte Sylvestre; 2,084	Antonio Yanakis (Ind); 1,292	Robert de Cotret; Berthier—Maskinongé—Lanaudière
Champlain	Michel Champagne; 29,788	André Burke; 7,471	Jocelyn Crête; 8,792			Michel Champagne
Joliette	Gaby Larrivée; 27,908	Denis Coderre; 12,573	Claude Hétu; 7,232	Gaétan Riopel-Savignac; 2,290	Jean-François Desroches (Ind); 530; François Roy (PfC); 128	Gaby Larrivée
Lotbinière	Maurice Tremblay; 26,585	Pierre Lajeunesse; 15,067	Richard Lacoursière; 8,782			Maurice Tremblay
Portneuf	Marc Ferland; 23,893	Paulin Plamondon; 11,055	Jean-Marie Fiset; 5,100	Reynald Desrochers; 1,607		Marc Ferland
Richelieu	Louis Plamondon; 32,104	Yvon Hébert; 8,979	Gaston Dupuis; 3,154	Jacqueline Lacoste; 1,896	Paul Poison Hevey (Rhino); 457	Louis Plamondon
Saint-Maurice	Denis Pronovost; 18,741	Yvon Milette; 10,168	Claude Rompré; 12,463			Gilles Grondin (Note: Gilles Grondin was elected in a by-election on September 29, 1986. Jean Chrétien was elected in the 1984 Canadian federal election.)
Trois-Rivières	Pierre H. Vincent; 29,370	Nicholas Papirakis; 6,727	Josée Trudel; 5,470		Danielle La Chicane Saint-Laurent (Rhino); 826; Lise Éthier (Ind); 249	Pierre H. Vincent

=== 1984 ===
Electoral district	Candidates				Incumbent
Electoral district	PC	Liberal	NDP	Other	Incumbent
Berthier—Maskinongé—Lanaudière	Robert de Cotret; 31,189	Antonio Yanakis; 11,736	Jean Philip Penner; 1,200	676	Antonio Yanakis; Berthier—Maskinongé
Champlain	Michel Champagne; 27,467	Michel Veillette; 14,459	Louise Cloutier; 3,124	723	Michel Veillette
Joliette	Roch La Salle; 38,839	Hélène Meagher; 9,006	Martin Vaillancourt; 2,186	2,516	Roch La Salle
Lotbinière	Maurice Tremblay; 22,584	Jean-Guy Dubois; 20,202	Gaston Coté; 1,963	1,790	Jean-Guy Dubois
Portneuf	Marc Ferland; 23,797	Rolland Dion; 17,687	Jacques Pelchat; 3,012	2,108	Rolland Dion
Richelieu	Louis Plamondon; 28,747	Jean-Louis Leduc; 14,933	Gaston Dupuis; 2,174	2,686	Jean-Louis Leduc
Saint-Maurice	Roger Armand Charbonneau; 14,468	Jean Chrétien; 24,050	Danielle Delbecque; 1,433	892	Jean Chrétien
Trois-Rivières	Pierre H. Vincent; 26,843	Françoise C. Drolet; 10,217	Robert John Pratt; 1,947	2,975	Claude Lajoie
