= René Villemure =

Canadian politician

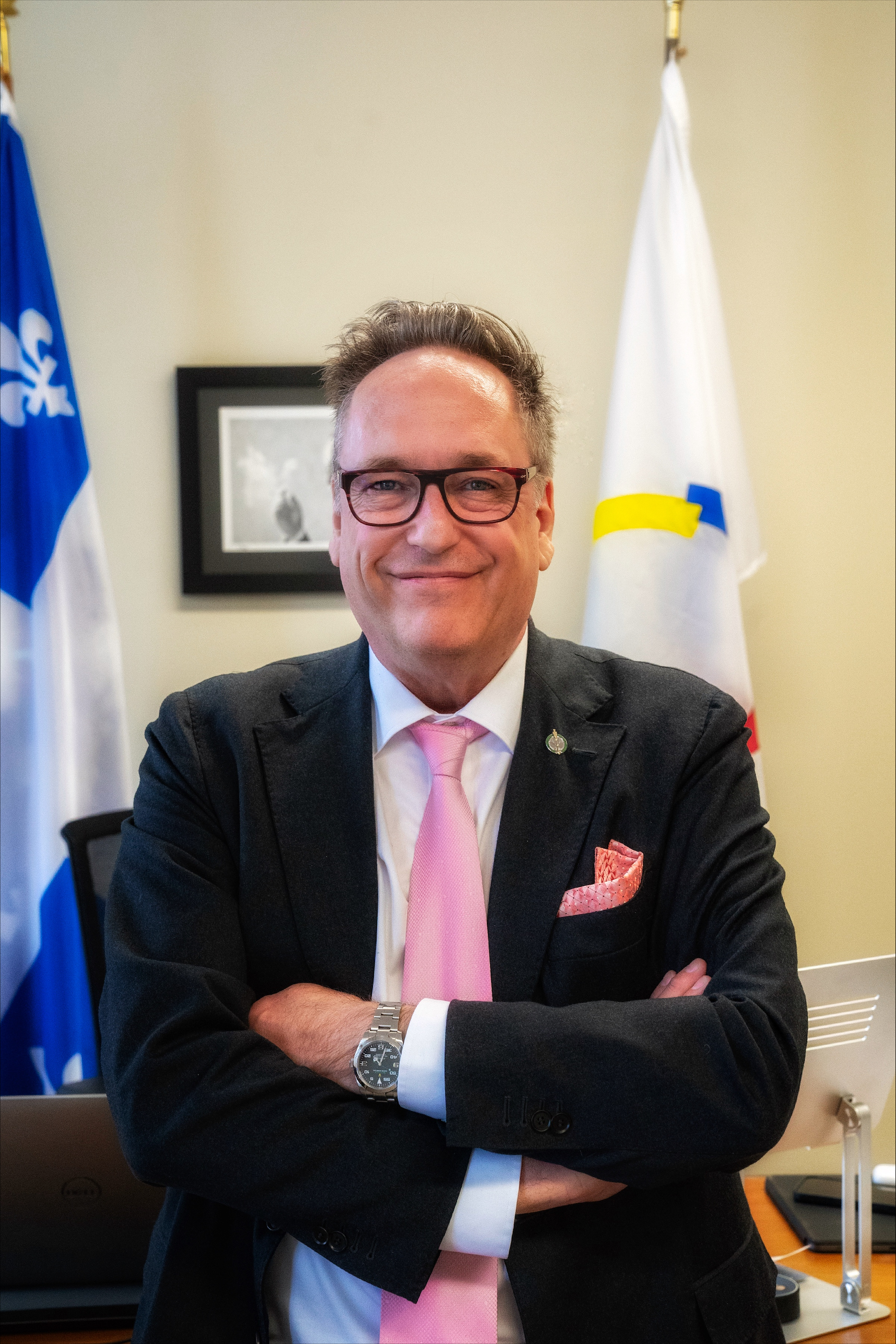
- Villemure in 2024

Member of Parliament for Trois-Rivières
- In office September 20, 2021 – March 23, 2025
- Preceded by: Louise Charbonneau
- Succeeded by: Caroline Desrochers

Personal details
- Party: Bloc Québécois
- Occupation: Politician

René Villemure (French pronunciation: [ʁəne vilmyʁ]) is a Canadian ethicist, philosopher, international lecturer and politician who was elected to represent the riding of Trois-Rivières in the House of Commons of Canada in the 2021 federal election. He is a member of the Bloc Québécois (BQ).

== Biography ==
Born in Drummondville, he grew up in Trois-Rivières where he did his high school studies at École secondaire Chavigny and his college studies at Cégep de Trois-Rivières.

At the time of the 2025 Canadian federal election, he lived in Saint-Boniface, Quebec.

=== Studies ===
After obtaining his master's degree in philosophy from the Université de Sherbrooke in 2000, René Villemure pursued doctoral studies in philosophy for three years.

== Professional career ==
René Villemure is the first ethicist in Canada outside of academia to devote himself to the ethical management of public and private companies. He created the field of practice of applied ethics for organizations.

In 1998, René Villemure founded the Institut québécois d'éthique appliquée. Since then, he has advised senior executives in both the public and private sectors on ethical issues, while conducting more than forty ethical diagnoses and drafting as many mission statements and value guides for his clients.

In 2003, René Villemure founded the company Éthikos. Since 2004, he has been publishing reflective bulletins that explain and illustrate ethics. Their objective is to contextualize ethics in real life situations.

From 2009 to 2020, René Villemure taught ethical governance at the College of Corporate Directors of Laval University and from 2018 to 2020, at the Directors College of McMaster University.

Villemure has given over 700 lectures around the world. They have reached over 75,000 people.

== Political career ==
=== 2021 Federal Elections ===
On April 15, 2021, Villemure announced his candidacy for the Bloc Québécois nomination in the riding of Trois-Rivières for the next federal election. His announcement created a controversy because during his speech, Villemure claimed to have the unanimous support of the riding executive, a statement that was relayed by the party's national leadership. However, the support of the local executive did not specifically support Villemure's candidacy, but rather that of all interested parties, including his opponent Pierre Piché. He did, however, receive the support of outgoing Bloc Québécois MP Louise Charbonneau and former Bloc Québécois MP Yves Rocheleau.

On August 16, 2021, the day after Prime Minister Justin Trudeau called the federal election, Yves-François Blanchet, leader of the Bloc Québécois, announced that René Villemure would be the party's candidate in Trois-Rivières, confirming that there would be no nomination meeting in the riding. A three-way battle ensued in the riding as Villemure faced former Trois-Rivières mayor Yves Lévesque, a Conservative Party candidate in the 2019 election who was again seeking election, and Martin Francoeur, former editorial writer for the Trois-Rivières newspaper Le Nouvelliste, a Liberal Party candidate.

On September 15, Villemure represented the Bloc Québécois at a national debate organized by Radio-Canada on Francophone issues. He argued that institutional bilingualism was a step backwards.

This close contest continued until the September 20 election and beyond, since the ballot count, completed the next morning and giving Villemure a 33-vote lead over the Conservative candidate, did not include mail-in ballots due to the Covid pandemic. It was not until two days later that the Bloc Québécois was able to get the vote. It was not until two days later that the final result was announced, giving Villemure a 93-vote lead over the Conservative Lévesque and a 560-vote lead over the Liberal Francoeur. Villemure thus became the Member of Parliament for Trois-Rivières in the House of Commons. The Conservative Lévesque requested a recount, which took place from October 5 to 7 in the basement of St. Pius X Church under the supervision of Judge Jocelyn Geoffroy. Villemure retained his victory, but with a lead of 83 votes.

=== 44th Legislature ===
René Villemure has been named the Bloc Québécois' spokesperson for Ethics, Privacy and Access to Information and the International Francophonie. Since 2021 he has served as the critic of ethics, protection of personal information, access to information and international francophonie in the Bloc Québécois Shadow Cabinet.

==== Ethics Committee ====
He is a member of the Ethics Committee and is elected vice-chair. In December 2021, René Villemure raises potential privacy issues as the Public Health Agency of Canada uses cellular location data to fight the pandemic. After obtaining a unanimous mandate, the committee's report concluded that the legislative framework for privacy protection needed to be revised.

In July 2022, Villemure, with the support of the Conservatives and the New Democratic Party, obtained an Ethics Committee review of the Royal Canadian Mounted Police's use of spyware. The RCMP confirmed the use of spyware without consulting the Privacy Commissioner of Canada. However, contrary to what was initially believed, it is not the Israeli spyware Pegasus.

==== International Francophonie ====
He is elected vice-president of the Canadian section of the Assemblée des parlementaires de la Francophonie. As spokesperson, René Villemure denounced the discriminatory treatment of French-speaking foreign students by the federal government. He indicated that the refusal rate for student visas is 79% at UQTR, while it is 9% at McGill University in 2021. UQTR is the university most affected by this phenomenon.

As a result of economic sanctions against Russian companies and leaders imposed by Canada in response to Russia's invasion of Ukraine in 2022, René Villemure is one of about 60 Quebecers banned from Russia.

== Publications ==
René Villemure, L'éthique pour tous... même vous!, Montreal, Les Éditions de l'Homme, September 2019, 216 pp. (ISBN 978-2-7619-5301-6)

== Award ==
Villemure receives an honorary doctorate in 2019 from the Université du Québec à Trois-Rivières for his outstanding contribution to the advancement of society in the field of ethics.

== Electoral history ==
2025 Canadian federal election: Trois-Rivières
Party	Candidate	Votes	%	±%
Liberal	Caroline Desrochers	25,147	41.01	+12.38
Bloc Québécois	René Villemure	16,921	27.60	−1.89
Conservative	Yves Levesque	16,708	27.25	−2.10
New Democratic	Matthew Sévigny	1,437	2.34	−5.71
Green	David Turcotte	569	0.93	−0.37
People's	Yan Patry	320	0.52	−1.40
Rhinoceros	Mathieu Doyon	215	0.35	N/A
Total valid votes/expense limit		61,317	98.32	
Total rejected ballots		1,046	1.68	-0.37
Turnout		62,363	68.11	+3.91
Eligible voters		91,563		
Liberal gain from Bloc Québécois		Swing		+7.14
Source: Elections Canada
Note: number of eligible voters does not include voting day registrations.

2021 Canadian federal election: Trois-Rivières
Party	Candidate	Votes	%	±%	Expenditures
Bloc Québécois	René Villemure	17,136	29.49	+1.01	$16,854.26
Conservative	Yves Lévesque	17,053	29.35	+4.17	$40,285.49
Liberal	Martin Francoeur	16,637	28.63	+2.57	$80,504.68
New Democratic	Adis Simidzija	4,680	8.05	-8.61	$4,281.85
People's	Jean Landry	1,115	1.92	+0.99	$0.00
Green	Andrew Holman	754	1.30	-1.17	$0.00
Free	Gilles Brodeur	735	1.26	–	$1,244.68
Total valid votes/expense limit		58,110	97.95	–	$120,485.08
Total rejected ballots		1,214	2.05	–	
Turnout		59,324	64.19	-2.53	
Eligible voters		92,413			
Bloc Québécois hold		Swing		-1.58	
Source: Elections Canada
