= Wilfrid Gariépy =

Canadian politician (1877–1960)

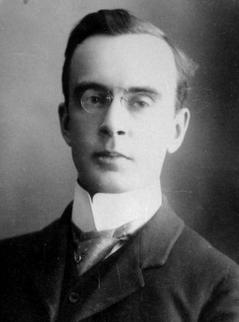

Member of the House of Commons of Canada for Three Rivers
- In office October 14, 1935 – March 26, 1940
- Preceded by: Hector-Louis Langevin
- Succeeded by: Robert Ryan
- In office June 11, 1945 – June 27, 1949
- Preceded by: Robert Ryan
- Succeeded by: Léon Balcer

Provincial Secretary of Alberta
- In office August 26, 1918 – September 25, 1918
- Preceded by: Archibald J. McLean
- Succeeded by: Jean Côté

Alberta Minister of Municipal Affairs
- In office October 30, 1917 – August 25, 1918
- Preceded by: Charles Stewart
- Succeeded by: Alexander Grant MacKay

Member of the Legislative Assembly of Alberta for Beaver River
- In office April 17, 1913 – July 18, 1921
- Preceded by: New district
- Succeeded by: Joseph Miville Dechene

Alderman on the Edmonton City Council
- In office December 10, 1906 – December 12, 1910

Personal details
- Born: March 14, 1877 Montreal, Québec
- Died: January 13, 1960 (aged 82) Trois-Rivières, Québec
- Party: Liberal Party of Canada
- Other political affiliations: Alberta Liberal Party
- Spouse: Albertina Lessard
- Children: 4
- Education: Université Laval, McGill University
- Profession: Lawyer

Wilfrid Gariépy (March 14, 1877 – January 13, 1960) was a Canadian politician, member of the Legislative Assembly of Alberta and provincial cabinet minister, member of the House of Commons of Canada, and municipal councillor in Edmonton.

== Early life ==
Wilfrid Gariépy was born in Montreal, Quebec, on March 14, 1877, born to parents Joseph Gariépy and Etudienne Boissoneault. He graduated high school from St-Laurent College and came to Edmonton with his family in 1893. Shortly after, he returned to Montreal for university, earning a B.A. from Université Laval in 1899 and a B.C.L. from McGill University in 1902.

He married Albertina Lessard, with whom he later had four children. He was admitted to the Alberta bar the same year and began work with the firm Taylor, Boyle & Gariépy. Later, he headed Gariépy, Landry & Landry.

His younger brother was Charles Gariépy who, like Wilfrid and their father, took an interest in politics.

== Edmonton municipal politics ==
Gariépy's involvement in politics began with his election to Edmonton's Catholic school board in the 1905 Edmonton election. He served in this capacity for nine years, eventually becoming chair.

In the 1906 election, Gariépy ran for election to Edmonton City Council, finished first of twelve candidates for alderman, and was elected to a two-year term. He was re-elected in 1908, finishing first of thirteen candidates, but did not seek re-election at the conclusion of this second term. He was known for supporting the viewpoints of organized labour.

== Alberta provincial politics ==
Gariépy made a first, abortive, bid for provincial office during the 1905 Alberta election, when he planned to run as an independent Liberal in St. Albert but withdrew before the election. He stayed in the race until election day in the 1909 election (while he was still an alderman in Edmonton), running in the same riding and under the same banner after refusing to contest the Liberal nomination on the grounds that he considered it rigged in favour of Lucien Boudreau. Gariépy was defeated by Boudreau in the election itself, finishing second of three candidates.

He was more successful in the 1913 election, when he ran in the new Beaver River electoral district. He handily defeated Conservative candidate Ambrose Gray in a two-person race, and became a member of the Legislative Assembly of Alberta. Premier Arthur Sifton named him to his cabinet as Minister of Municipal Affairs. In accordance with the customs of the day, Gariépy resigned to contest a by-election; no opponents stepped forward, and he was acclaimed.

He was re-elected in the 1917 election by an even larger margin over Gray, his 1913 opponent. When Charles Stewart took over from Sifton as premier, he initially left Gariépy in the municipal affairs portfolio, but appointed him Provincial Secretary instead in 1918. Gariépy lasted only a short time in the job, and quit a month later to move to Trois-Rivières, Quebec, where he had been promised a seat in the House of Commons of Canada. However, the promised seat didn't materialize, and he returned to Alberta shortly thereafter to resume his career as an MLA (a position from which he had not resigned).

During the Conscription Crisis of 1917 Gariépy aligned himself against Robert Borden's Unionist government (of which his old boss Sifton had resigned as premier to become a member), and toured the province with Frank Oliver speaking against it.

A motion was moved in the assembly in 1920 by John Stewart questioning whether Gariépy had a right to sit and vote in the legislature as he signed the Legislature registry with his home as being Three Rivers in Quebec. The motion asked the committee of privileges and elections for investigation. John Boyle amended the motion to ask the provincial courts to investigate the matter. The amendment and motion passed on a recorded division.

He did not seek re-election in the 1921 election and moved back to Trois-Rivières.

== Federal politics ==
Some time after his return to Quebec, Gariépy was again involved in politics. He was a Liberal organizer in Trois-Rivières, and was rumoured candidate in the 1923 provincial election and the 1925 federal election, but did not run in either.

When the Liberal MP for Three Rivers and St. Maurice, Arthur Bettez, died on January 4, 1931, Gariépy finally did run, securing the Liberal nomination in the by-election to replace Bettez. In the by-election, held August 10, he was defeated by thirty-eight votes by Conservative candidate Charles Bourgeois.

In the 1935 federal election, Gariépy was again the Liberal candidate in the riding (now called Three Rivers). This time, he was elected from a field of six candidates (Bourgeois not among them). On the outbreak of the Second World War, he broke from the policy of the government of William Lyon MacKenzie King, going so far as to vote against war credits, and when he sought re-election in the 1940 election it was as an Independent Liberal. He was defeated in the two-person race by Robert Ryan, the Liberal Party's duly-nominated candidate.

The King government's policy of conscription cost it popularity in Quebec, and Gariépy's critical approach gained favour. So it was that when he ran again during the 1945 election, this time as an independent, he came out ahead of his six opponents (Ryan finished fourth). During this, his second term in the House of Commons, he reconciled with his old party, and ran in the 1949 election it was once again as a Liberal. He came in fifty-nine votes behind Progressive Conservative Léon Balcer, and did not seek public office again in his lifetime.

== Other activities, personal life, and legacy ==
In 1894, Gariépy was co-founder of Edmonton's Saint-Jean-Baptiste Society. He was also member of the Société Parler Français, and represented Alberta at 1912's Congrès de la langue française in Quebec. He was a Rotarian and a member of the Knights of Columbus.

In 1909, Gariépy founded le Progrès libéral, Alberta's third French-language newspaper, in Morinville. In 1914, it relocated to Edmonton and was renamed le Progrès albertain. The paper's loyalties were to the Liberal Party, and it encouraged francophone immigration to Alberta. It folded in August 1915.

Wilfrid Gariépy died January 13, 1960, in Trois-Rivières. The Gariépy neighbourhood in Edmonton is named in his family's honour.

== Electoral record ==
By-election on 10 August 1931
Party	Candidate	Votes
Conservative	Charles Bourgeois	13,539
Liberal	Wilfrid Gariépy	13,501

== See also ==
- Université Laval

Alberta provincial government of Arthur Sifton
Cabinet post (1)
Predecessor	Office	Successor
Charles Stewart	Minister of Municipal Affairs; November 29, 1913–October 30, 1917	Continued into next ministry
Alberta provincial government of Charles Stewart
Cabinet posts (2)
Predecessor	Office	Successor
Continued from previous ministry	Minister of Municipal Affairs; October 30, 1917–August 25, 1918	Alexander MacKay
Archibald J. McLean	Provincial Secretary; August 26, 1918–September 25, 1918	Jean Côté
Legislative Assembly of Alberta
Preceded by New District	MLA Beaver River; 1913–1921	Succeeded by Joseph Miville Dechene
Parliament of Canada
Preceded by Hector-Louis Langevin	Member of Parliament Three Rivers; 1935–1940	Succeeded by Robert Ryan
Preceded by Robert Ryan	Member of Parliament Three Rivers; 1945–1949	Succeeded by Léon Balcer
