= Canadian House of Commons Standing Committee on Human Resources, Skills and Social Development and the Status of Persons with Disabilities =

Standing committee of the House of Commons of Canada

The House of Commons Standing Committee on Human Resources, Skills and Social Development and the Status of Persons with Disabilities (HUMA) is a standing committee of the House of Commons of Canada.

== Mandate ==
- The mandate and management of Department of Human Resources and Skills Development Canada and its subsidiary agencies:
  - The Canada Industrial Relations Board
  - The Canadian Centre for Occupational Health and Safety
  - The Canadian Artists and Producers Professional Relations Tribunal
  - The Canada Mortgage and Housing Corporation
- The study of topics relating to the Department, including:
  - Employment insurance
  - Employment benefits and support measures
  - Income security programs
  - The Canada Labour Code
  - Post-secondary education and training
  - Social programs for seniors, families, children and persons with disabilities
- The study of recommendations to shorten the foreign qualification recognition process
- Skills development in remote rural communities

== Membership ==
As of the 45th Canadian Parliament:

Party	Member	District
Liberal	Bobby Morrissey, chair	Egmont, PE
Conservative	Rosemarie Falk, vice chair	Battlefords—Lloydminster—Meadow Lake, SK
Bloc Québecois	Marilène Gill, vice chair	Côte-Nord—Kawawachikamach—Nitassinan, QC
Liberal	Caroline Desrochers	Trois-Rivières, QC
Liberal	Jessica Fancy-Landry	South Shore—St. Margarets, NS
Conservative	Garnett Genuis	Sherwood Park—Fort Saskatchewan, AB
Conservative	Laila Goodridge	Fort McMurray—Cold Lake, AB
Liberal	Natilien Joseph	Longueuil—Saint-Hubert, QC
Liberal	Annie Koutrakis	Vimy, QC
Conservative	Colin Reynolds	Elmwood—Transcona, MB

== Subcommittees ==
- Subcommittee on Agenda and Procedure (SHUM)
