= Robert Ryan (Canadian politician) =

Canadian politician

Robert Ryan (July 9, 1878 – November 9, 1954) was a politician from Quebec, Canada.

An accountant by profession, he was a Liberal candidate in the federal district of Three Rivers and St. Maurice in 1925, but lost.

He ran again in the district of Three Rivers in 1940 and won. In 1945 though, Ryan was defeated by Independent Liberal Wilfrid Gariépy.

== Footnotes ==
Parliament of Canada
Preceded by Wilfrid Gariépy (Liberal)	Member of Parliament Three Rivers; 1940–1945	Succeeded by Wilfrid Gariépy (Independent)
