= Trois-Rivières (federal electoral district) =

Federal electoral district in Quebec, Canada

Coordinates: 46.359°N 72.608°W

Quebec electoral district
- Interactive map of riding boundaries from the 2015 federal election

Federal electoral district
- Legislature: House of Commons
MP
Caroline Desrochers
Liberal
- District created: 1976
- First contested: 1979
- Last contested: 2025
- District webpage: profile, map

Demographics
- Population (2021): 114,064
- Electors (2021): 92,335
- Area (km²): 125.31
- Pop. density (per km²): 910.3
- Census division: Trois-Rivières
- Census subdivision: Trois-Rivières (part)

Trois-Rivières (French: [tʁwɑ ʁivjɛʁ], Canadian French: [tʁwɔ ʁivjaɛ̯ʁ]; formerly known as Three Rivers and Trois-Rivières Métropolitain) is an electoral district in Quebec, Canada that has been represented in the House of Commons of Canada from 1867 to 1892 and from 1935 to the present.

It was created as "Three Rivers" riding by the British North America Act 1867. The electoral district was abolished in 1892 when it was merged into Three Rivers and St. Maurice riding.

The electoral district's English name changed in 1947 to "Trois-Rivières". The riding's name was changed again in 1972 to "Trois-Rivières Métropolitain". Trois-Rivières Métropolitain was abolished in 1976 when it was redistributed into a new "Trois-Rivières" riding and Champlain riding.

This riding lost territory to Saint-Maurice—Champlain and gained territory from Berthier—Maskinongé during the 2012 electoral redistribution.

== Geography ==
The riding, in the Quebec region of Mauricie, consists of most of the city of Trois-Rivières, excepting the former cities of Trois-Rivières-Ouest and Pointe-du-Lac.

The neighbouring ridings are Berthier—Maskinongé, Saint-Maurice—Champlain, and Bas-Richelieu—Nicolet—Bécancour.

== Demographics ==
(As of 2021)

- Average family income: $74,200
- Median household income: $56,800
- Unemployment: 8%
- Language: 93.3% French, 1.3% Spanish, 1.2% English, 1% Arabic
- Religion: 70.4% Christian (63.9% Catholic), 27.1% No religion, 2% Muslim
- Ethnicity: 91% White, 3.2% Black, 2% Indigenous, 1.4% Latin American, 1.2% Arab

== History ==
=== Members of Parliament ===
This riding has elected the following members of Parliament:

Parliament	Years	Member	Party
Three Rivers
1st	1867–1868	Louis-Charles Boucher de Niverville	Conservative
1st	1868–1872	William McDougall	Conservative
2nd	1872–1874	William McDougall	Conservative
3rd	1874–1878	William McDougall	Conservative
4th	1878–1878	William McDougall	Conservative
4th	1878–1882	Hector-Louis Langevin	Conservative
5th	1882–1887	Hector-Louis Langevin	Conservative
6th	1887–1891	Hector-Louis Langevin	Conservative
7th	1891–1896	Hector-Louis Langevin	Conservative
Riding dissolved into Three Rivers and St. Maurice
Riding re-created from Three Rivers—St. Maurice
18th	1935–1940	Wilfrid Gariépy	Liberal
19th	1940–1945	Robert Ryan	Liberal
20th	1945–1949	Wilfrid Gariépy	Independent
Trois-Rivières
21st	1949–1953	Léon Balcer	Progressive Conservative
22nd	1953–1957	Léon Balcer	Progressive Conservative
23rd	1957–1958	Léon Balcer	Progressive Conservative
24th	1958–1962	Léon Balcer	Progressive Conservative
25th	1962–1963	Léon Balcer	Progressive Conservative
26th	1963–1965	Léon Balcer	Progressive Conservative
27th	1965–1968	Joseph-Alfred Mongrain	Independent
28th	1968–1971	Joseph-Alfred Mongrain	Liberal
28th	1971–1972	Claude Lajoie	Liberal
Trois-Rivières Métropolitain
29th	1972–1974	Claude Lajoie	Liberal
30th	1974–1979	Claude Lajoie	Liberal
Trois-Rivières
31st	1979–1980	Claude Lajoie	Liberal
32nd	1980–1984	Claude Lajoie	Liberal
33rd	1984–1988	Pierre H. Vincent	Progressive Conservative
34th	1988–1993	Pierre H. Vincent	Progressive Conservative
35th	1993–1997	Yves Rocheleau	Bloc Québécois
36th	1997–2000	Yves Rocheleau	Bloc Québécois
37th	2000–2004	Yves Rocheleau	Bloc Québécois
38th	2004–2006	Paule Brunelle	Bloc Québécois
39th	2006–2008	Paule Brunelle	Bloc Québécois
40th	2008–2011	Paule Brunelle	Bloc Québécois
41st	2011–2015	Robert Aubin	New Democratic
42nd	2015–2019	Robert Aubin	New Democratic
43rd	2019–2021	Louise Charbonneau	Bloc Québécois
44th	2021–2025	René Villemure	Bloc Québécois
45th	2025–present	Caroline Desrochers	Liberal

== Election results ==
=== Trois-Rivières, 1979–present ===
Graph of election results in Trois-Rivières (1976–, minor parties that never received 2% of the vote or did not run consistently are omitted)

2025 Canadian federal election
Party	Candidate	Votes	%	±%	Expenditures
Liberal	Caroline Desrochers	25,147	41.01	+12.38	$83,125.57
Bloc Québécois	René Villemure	16,921	27.60	−1.89	$33,855.86
Conservative	Yves Levesque	16,708	27.25	−2.10	$67,897.19
New Democratic	Matthew Sévigny	1,437	2.34	−5.71	$0.00
Green	David Turcotte	569	0.93	−0.37	$0.00
People's	Yan Patry	320	0.52	−1.40	$18.03
Rhinoceros	Mathieu Doyon	215	0.35	N/A	$0.00
Total valid votes/expense limit		61,317	98.32	–	$137,453.86
Total rejected ballots		1,046	1.68	-0.37	
Turnout		62,363	68.11	+3.91	
Eligible voters		91,563			
Liberal gain from Bloc Québécois		Swing		+7.14	
Source: Elections Canada
Note: number of eligible voters does not include voting day registrations.

2021 Canadian federal election
Party	Candidate	Votes	%	±%	Expenditures
Bloc Québécois	René Villemure	17,136	29.49	+1.01	$16,854.26
Conservative	Yves Lévesque	17,053	29.35	+4.17	$40,285.49
Liberal	Martin Francoeur	16,637	28.63	+2.57	$80,504.68
New Democratic	Adis Simidzija	4,680	8.05	-8.61	$4,281.85
People's	Jean Landry	1,115	1.92	+0.99	$0.00
Green	Andrew Holman	754	1.30	-1.17	$0.00
Free	Gilles Brodeur	735	1.26	–	$1,244.68
Total valid votes/expense limit		58,110	97.95	–	$120,485.08
Total rejected ballots		1,214	2.05	–	
Turnout		59,324	64.19	-2.53	
Eligible voters		92,413			
Bloc Québécois hold		Swing		-1.58	
Source: Elections Canada

2019 Canadian federal election
Party	Candidate	Votes	%	±%	Expenditures
Bloc Québécois	Louise Charbonneau	17,240	28.48	+11.48	$19,118.47
Liberal	Valérie Renaud-Martin	15,774	26.06	-4.16	$59,713.01
Conservative	Yves Lévesque	15,240	25.17	+6.54	none listed
New Democratic	Robert Aubin	10,090	16.67	-15.16	none listed
Green	Marie Duplessis	1,492	2.46	+0.75	none listed
People's	Marc-André Gingras	565	0.93	–	$5,574.25
Independent	Ronald St-Onge Lynch	137	0.23	–	$0.00
Total valid votes/expense limit		60,538	100.0		
Total rejected ballots		1,092	1.77		
Turnout		61,630	66.73		
Eligible voters		92,362			
Bloc Québécois gain from New Democratic		Swing		+7.82	
Source: Elections Canada

2015 Canadian federal election
Party	Candidate	Votes	%	±%	Expenditures
New Democratic	Robert Aubin	19,193	31.83	-17.87	$59,109.30
Liberal	Yvon Boivin	18,224	30.22	+20.19	$33,318.95
Conservative	Dominic Therrien	11,231	18.63	+5.48	$88,781.37
Bloc Québécois	André Valois	10,249	17.00	-7.21	$37,874.56
Green	Éric Trottier	1,032	1.71	-0.18	–
Libertarian	Maxime Rousseau	360	0.6	–	–
Total valid votes/expense limit		60,289	100.0		$232,803.19
Total rejected ballots		940	–	–	
Turnout		61,229	–	–	
Eligible voters		90,900			
Source: Elections Canada

2011 Canadian federal election
Party	Candidate	Votes	%	±%	Expenditures
New Democratic	Robert Aubin	26,981	53.57	+44.39	
Bloc Québécois	Paule Brunelle	11,987	23.80	-21.46	
Conservative	Pierre Lacroix	6,205	12.32	-11.92	
Liberal	Patrice Mangin	3,617	7.18	-11.01	
Green	Louis Lacroix	972	1.93	-1.18	
Independent	Marc-André Fortin	346	0.69	–	
Rhinoceros	Francis Arsenault	256	0.51	–	
Total valid votes/expense limit		50,364	100.00		
Total rejected ballots		889	1.73	–	
Turnout		51,253	64.59	–	
Eligible voters		79,346	–	–	

2008 Canadian federal election
Party	Candidate	Votes	%	±%	Expenditures
Bloc Québécois	Paule Brunelle	22,405	45.26	-0.2	$77,449
Conservative	Claude Durand	11,998	24.24	-9.1	$76,522
Liberal	Marcos G. Simard	9,008	18.19	+7.3	$17,099
New Democratic	Geneviève Boivin	4,544	9.18	+2.5	$2,096
Green	Ariane Blais	1,540	3.11	+0.3	
Total valid votes/expense limit		39,579	100.0	$84,242	

2006 Canadian federal election
Party	Candidate	Votes	%	±%	Expenditures
Bloc Québécois	Paule Brunelle	22,331	45.9	-10.6	$52,451
Conservative	Luc Ménard	15,423	31.7	+22.2	$10,874
Liberal	Martine Girard	5,268	10.8	-16.5	$19,948
New Democratic	Geneviève Boivin	3,774	7.8	+4.2	$1,703
Green	Linda Lavoie	1,513	3.1	-0.1	
Marijuana	Paul Giroux	371	0.8	–	
Total valid votes/expense limit		48,680	100.0	$78,516	

2004 Canadian federal election
Party	Candidate	Votes	%	±%	Expenditures
Bloc Québécois	Paule Brunelle	26,240	56.5	+9.8	$52,143
Liberal	Jean-Éric Guindon	12,703	27.4	-15.6	$69,554
Conservative	Jean-Guy Mercier	4,381	9.4	+1.6	$9,519
New Democratic	Marc Tessier	1,635	3.5	2.5	$1,416
Green	Linda Lavoie	1,476	3.2	–	
Total valid votes/expense limit		46,435	100.0	$77,441	

Note: Conservative vote is compared to the total of the Canadian Alliance vote and Progressive Conservative vote in 2000 election.

2000 Canadian federal election
Party	Candidate	Votes	%	±%
Bloc Québécois	Yves Rocheleau	22,405	46.7	+4.2
Liberal	Denis Normandin	20,606	42.9	+11.6
Alliance	Luc Legaré	2,161	4.5	
Progressive Conservative	Scott Healy	1,599	3.3	-20.8
Natural Law	Gilles Raymond	538	1.1	+0.1
New Democratic	David Horlock	512	1.1	–
Marxist–Leninist	Alexandre Deschênes	184	0.4	
Total valid votes		48,005	100.0	

1997 Canadian federal election
Party	Candidate	Votes	%	±%
Bloc Québécois	Yves Rocheleau	21,267	42.5	-10.7
Liberal	Jean-Guy Doucet	15,692	31.3	+10.1
Progressive Conservative	Michel Charland	12,102	24.2	+0.5
New Democratic	Dorothy Hénaut	528	1.1	+0.3
Natural Law	Roger Périgny	503	1.0	-0.1
Total valid votes		50,092	100.0	

1993 Canadian federal election
Party	Candidate	Votes	%	±%
Bloc Québécois	Yves Rocheleau	24,882	53.2	
Progressive Conservative	Pierre H. Vincent	11,053	23.6	-45.2
Liberal	Jean-Pierre Caron	9,937	21.2	+5.5
Natural Law	Roger Périgny	522	1.1	
New Democratic	Maryse Choquette	374	0.8	-12.0
Total valid votes		46,768	100.0	

1988 Canadian federal election
Party	Candidate	Votes	%	±%
Progressive Conservative	Pierre H. Vincent	29,370	68.9	+4.9
Liberal	Nicholas Papirakis	6,727	15.8	-8.6
New Democratic	Josée Trudel	5,470	12.8	+8.2
Rhinoceros	Danielle La Chicane Saint-Laurent	826	1.9	-0.5
Independent	Lise Éthier	249	0.6	
Total valid votes		42,642	100.0	

1984 Canadian federal election
Party	Candidate	Votes	%	±%
Progressive Conservative	Pierre H. Vincent	26,843	63.9	+51.0
Liberal	Françoise C. Drolet	10,217	24.3	-44.1
New Democratic	John A. Pratt	1,947	4.6	-6.5
Parti nationaliste	Yves Rocheleau	1,847	4.4	
Rhinoceros	Houblon-oubedon Lemoine	1,018	2.4	
Communist	Paul Gagné	110	0.3	
Total valid votes		41,982	100.0	

1980 Canadian federal election
Party	Candidate	Votes	%	±%
Liberal	Claude Lajoie	23,791	68.5	+7.5
Progressive Conservative	Jean Méthot	4,482	12.9	+2.2
New Democratic	Denis Faubert	3,870	11.1	+6.7
Independent	Raymond Lajoie	1,898	5.5	
Independent	Rodolphe Lemieux	283	0.8	
Union populaire	Guy Baillargeon	249	0.7	+0.5
Marxist–Leninist	Lise Éthier	168	0.5	+0.3
Total valid votes		34,741	100.0	
Source: open.canada.ca

1979 Canadian federal election
Party	Candidate	Votes	%	±%
Liberal	Claude Lajoie	23,311	61.0	-0.2
Social Credit	Léopold Alarie	7,950	20.8	+1.8
Progressive Conservative	Roland Julien	4,099	10.7	-4.2
New Democratic	Roland Auger	1,682	4.4	0.0
Rhinoceros	Alain Beaupré	947	2.5	
Independent	Gilles Gervais	77	0.2	
Union populaire	Gilles Marier	66	0.2	
Marxist–Leninist	Lise Éthier	63	0.2	-0.4
Communist	Jeannette Walsh	36	0.1	
Total valid votes		38,231	100.0	

=== Trois-Rivières Métropolitain, 1972–1979 ===
Graph of election results in Trois-Rivières Métropolitain (1972–1976, minor parties that never received 2% of the vote or did not run consistently are omitted)

1974 Canadian federal election
Party	Candidate	Votes	%	±%
Liberal	Claude Lajoie	24,335	61.2	+16.8
Social Credit	Réal Ménard	7,538	18.9	-19.5
Progressive Conservative	Yvon Massicotte	5,949	15.0	+2.3
New Democratic	Yvon Roland Chamberland	1,738	4.4	-0.1
Marxist–Leninist	Jacques Auger	221	0.6	
Total valid votes		39,781	100.0	
lop.parl.ca

1972 Canadian federal election
Party	Candidate	Votes	%	±%
Liberal	Claude Lajoie	19,892	44.4	-3.3
Social Credit	Réal Lemay	17,250	38.5	-4.8
Progressive Conservative	Edgar Lesieur	5,662	12.6	+5.8
New Democratic	Jacques Hébert	2,022	4.5	
Total valid votes		44,826	100.0	

=== Trois-Rivières, 1949–1972 ===
Graph of election results in Trois-Rivières (1947–1972, minor parties that never received 2% of the vote or did not run consistently are omitted)

Canadian federal by-election, May 31, 1971 On Mr. Mongrain's death, 23 December 1970
Party	Candidate	Votes	%	±%
Liberal	Claude Lajoie	12,809	47.7	+1.5
Social Credit	Réal Lemay	11,616	43.3	+24.1
Progressive Conservative	Thérèse-M. Landry	1,827	6.8	-20.8
Independent	Henri-Georges Grenier (Espirit social)	422	1.6	
Republican	Joseph Thibodeau	170	0.6	
Total valid votes		26,844	100.0	
Note: Social Credit vote is compared to Ralliement créditiste vote in the 1968 election.
Source: lop.parl.ca

1968 Canadian federal election
Party	Candidate	Votes	%	±%
Liberal	Joseph-Alfred Mongrain	17,592	46.2	+12.6
Progressive Conservative	Gilles Gauthier	10,501	27.6	+12.4
Ralliement créditiste	Émile Fréchette	7,305	19.2	+11.3
New Democratic	Philippe Daviault	1,724	4.5	+2.2
Independent	Gaston Pelletier	566	1.5	
Independent	Lucien Bornais	364	1.0	
Total valid votes		38,052	100.0	

1965 Canadian federal election
Party	Candidate	Votes	%	±%
Independent	Joseph-Alfred Mongrain	12,927	40.9	
Liberal	Pierre Garceau	10,617	33.6	-6.5
Progressive Conservative	Jean Méthot	4,799	15.2	-29.5
Ralliement créditiste	Philippe Daviault	2,488	7.9	-5.1
New Democratic	Joseph Rivard	749	2.4	+0.2
Total valid votes		31,580	100.0	

Note: Ralliement créditiste vote is compared to Social Credit vote in the 1963 election.

1963 Canadian federal election
Party	Candidate	Votes	%	±%
Progressive Conservative	Léon Balcer	14,558	44.7	-4.0
Liberal	Claude Bisson	13,077	40.1	+3.6
Social Credit	Lucien Richard	4,224	13.0	-1.8
New Democratic	Alfred Robindaine	718	2.2	
Total valid votes		32,577	100.0	

1962 Canadian federal election
Party	Candidate	Votes	%	±%
Progressive Conservative	Léon Balcer	15,545	48.7	-11.1
Liberal	Claude Bisson	11,675	36.6	-0.5
Social Credit	J.-Donat Dupont	4,715	14.8	
Total valid votes		31,935	100.0	

1958 Canadian federal election
Party	Candidate	Votes	%	±%
Progressive Conservative	Léon Balcer	18,049	59.7	+9.1
Liberal	Antoine Gauthier	11,193	37.1	-11.6
Independent	Henri-Georges Grenier (Capital familial)	968	3.2	+2.4
Total valid votes		30,210	100.0	

1957 Canadian federal election
Party	Candidate	Votes	%	±%
Progressive Conservative	Léon Balcer	15,004	50.6	-2.2
Liberal	François Nobert	14,412	48.6	+1.4
Independent	Henri-Georges Grenier (Capital familial)	237	0.8	
Total valid votes		29,653	100.0	

1953 Canadian federal election
Party	Candidate	Votes	%	±%
Progressive Conservative	Léon Balcer	15,556	52.8	+13.8
Liberal	Joseph-Alfred Mongrain	13,905	47.2	+8.4
Total valid votes		29,461	100.0	

1949 Canadian federal election
Party	Candidate	Votes	%	±%
Progressive Conservative	Léon Balcer	10,015	39.0	+18.8
Liberal	Wilfrid Gariépy	9,964	38.8	+26.5
Independent Liberal	Jules Biron	4,925	19.2	
Union des électeurs	Hector Brunelle	432	1.7	-2.1
Independent	Henri-Georges Grenier	367	1.4	-0.6
Total valid votes		25,703	100.0	

=== Three Rivers, 1935–1949 ===
Graph of election results in Three Rivers (1934–1949, minor parties that never received 2% of the vote or did not run consistently are omitted)

1945 Canadian federal election
Party	Candidate	Votes	%	±%
Independent	Wilfrid Gariépy	6,610	32.0	-15.0
Independent Liberal	Jean-Louis Marchand	5,947	28.8	
Progressive Conservative	Léon Méthot	4,173	20.2	
Liberal	Robert Ryan	2,525	12.2	-40.8
Social Credit	Onésime Cormier	787	3.8	
Independent	Henri-Georges Grenier	423	2.0	
Co-operative Commonwealth	Lionel Fortin	186	0.9	
Total valid votes		20,651	100.0	

1940 Canadian federal election
Party	Candidate	Votes	%	±%
Liberal	Robert Ryan	9,860	53.0	-2.0
Independent Liberal	Wilfrid Gariépy	8,734	47.0	
Total valid votes		18,594	100.0	

1935 Canadian federal election
Party	Candidate	Votes	%	±%
Liberal	Wilfrid Gariépy	6,114	30.1	
Conservative	Léon Méthot	5,748	28.3	-30.3
Liberal	Philippe Bigué	5,070	24.9	
Independent Liberal	Willie Poisson	2,267	11.2	
Reconstruction	Louis-D. Durand	1,049	5.2	
Independent Conservative	Louis Normand	76	0.4	
Total valid votes		20,324	100.0	

=== Three Rivers, 1867–1892 ===
Graph of election results in Three Rivers (1867–1892, minor parties that never received 2% of the vote or did not run consistently are omitted)

1891 Canadian federal election
Party	Candidate	Votes	%	±%
Conservative	Hector-Louis Langevin	682	58.6	+7.4
Liberal	L.T. Polette	482	41.4	-7.4
Total valid votes		1,164	100.0	

1887 Canadian federal election
Party	Candidate	Votes	%
Conservative	Hector-Louis Langevin	640	51.2
Liberal	L.P. Pelletier	610	48.8
Total valid votes		1,250	100.0

1882 Canadian federal election
Party	Candidate	Votes
Conservative	Hector-Louis Langevin	acclaimed

By-election on 21 November 1878 On Mr. McDougall's resignation
Party	Candidate	Votes
Conservative	Hector-Louis Langevin	acclaimed

1878 Canadian federal election
Party	Candidate	Votes	%	±%
Conservative	William McDougall	584	57.3	-20.9
Unknown	H.G. Malhiot	436	42.7	
Total valid votes		1,020	100.0	

1874 Canadian federal election
Party	Candidate	Votes	%
Conservative	William McDougall	451	78.2
Unknown	J.N. Bunan	126	21.8
Total valid votes		577	100.0

1872 Canadian federal election
Party	Candidate	Votes
Conservative	William McDougall	acclaimed

By-election on 17 October 1868 On Mr. Boucher de Niverville's resignation, 30 September 1868
Party	Candidate	Votes
Conservative	William McDougall	acclaimed

1867 Canadian federal election
Party	Candidate	Votes	%
Conservative	Louis-Charles Boucher de Niverville	277	66.0
Unknown	C. B. Genest	143	34.0
Total valid votes		420	100.0
Source: Canadian Parliamentary Guide, 1871

== Districts since 1867 that have included Trois-Rivières ==
The following list contains members of districts that have included Trois-Rivières, since 1867:

Name	Assignments	Party	Election	Popular Vote
Charles Boucher de Niverville	Government MP	Conservative	1867	66%
William McDougall	Government MP	Conservative	1868	unopposed
William McDougall	Government MP (before 1873); Official Opposition MP (after 1873)	Conservative	1872	unopposed
William McDougall	Official Opposition MP	Conservative	1874	78%
William McDougall	Government MP	Conservative	1878	57%
Hector Langevin	Cabinet Member	Conservative	1878	unopposed
Hector Langevin	Cabinet Member	Conservative	1882	unopposed
Hector Langevin	Cabinet Member	Conservative	1887	51%
Hector Langevin	Government MP; Cabinet Member (until 1891)	Conservative	1891	59%
Sir Adolphe-Philippe Caron	Official Opposition MP	Conservative	1896	54%
Jacques Bureau	Government MP	Liberal	1900	53%
Jacques Bureau	Government MP	Liberal	1904	54%
Jacques Bureau	Cabinet Member	Liberal	1907	unopposed
Jacques Bureau	Cabinet Member	Liberal	1908	64%
Jacques Bureau	Official Opposition MP	Liberal	1911	50%
Jacques Bureau	Official Opposition MP	Liberal	1917	unopposed
Jacques Bureau	Government MP	Liberal	1921	68%
Jacques Bureau	Cabinet Member	Liberal	1922	unopposed
Arthur Bettez	Government MP (until 1926); Official Opposition MP (after 1926)	Liberal	1925	56%
Arthur Bettez	Government MP	Liberal	1926	66%
Arthur Bettez	Official Opposition MP	Liberal	1930	57%
Charles Bourgeois	Government MP	Conservative	1931	50%
Wilfrid Gariépy	Government MP	Liberal	1935	30%
Robert Ryan	Government MP	Liberal	1940	53%
Wilfrid Gariépy	Independent MP	Independent	1945	32%
Léon Balcer	Official Opposition MP	Progressive Conservative	1949	39%
Léon Balcer	Official Opposition MP	Progressive Conservative	1953	53%
Léon Balcer	Cabinet Member	Progressive Conservative	1957	51%
Léon Balcer	Cabinet Member	Progressive Conservative	1958	60%
Léon Balcer	Cabinet Member	Progressive Conservative	1962	49%
Léon Balcer	Official Opposition MP	Progressive Conservative	1963	45%
Joseph-Alfred Mongrain	Independent MP	Independent	1965	59%
Joseph-Alfred Mongrain	Government MP	Liberal	1968	46%
Claude Lajoie	Government MP	Liberal	1971	48%
Claude Lajoie	Government MP	Liberal	1972	44%
Claude Lajoie	Government MP; Parliamentary Secretary (from 1975 to 1977)	Liberal	1974	61%
Claude Lajoie	Official Opposition MP	Liberal	1979	61%
Claude Lajoie	Government MP	Liberal	1980	68%
Pierre H. Vincent	Parliamentary Secretary	Progressive Conservative	1984	64%
Pierre H. Vincent	Parliamentary Secretary (until 1993); Cabinet Member (after 1993)	Progressive Conservative	1988	69%
Yves Rocheleau	Official Opposition MP	Bloc Québécois	1993	53%
Yves Rocheleau	Third Party MP	Bloc Québécois	1997	42%
Yves Rocheleau	Third Party MP	Bloc Québécois	2000	47%
Paule Brunelle	Third Party MP	Bloc Québécois	2004	57%
Paule Brunelle	Third Party MP	Bloc Québécois	2006	46%
Paule Brunelle	Third Party MP	Bloc Québécois	2008	46%

== See also ==
- List of Canadian electoral districts
- Mauricie
- Historical federal electoral districts of Canada
