= Joseph-Alfred Mongrain =

Canadian politician

- Official 1968 portrait

Member of the Canadian Parliament for Trois-Rivières
- In office 1965–1970
- Preceded by: Léon Balcer
- Succeeded by: Claude Lajoie

Personal details
- Born: 28 December 1908 St-Tite, Mauricie, Quebec
- Died: 23 December 1970 (aged 61) Trois-Rivières, Quebec
- Party: Liberal Party of Canada
- Occupation: Public relations officer

Joseph-Alfred Mongrain was a politician from Quebec, Canada.

== Background ==
He was born on 28 December 1908, in St-Tite, Mauricie. He was a public relations officer.

== Mayor of Trois-Rivières ==
He was Mayor of Trois-Rivières from 1949 to 1953 and from 1960 to 1963.

== Provincial politics ==
He ran as a Liberal candidate in 1952 in the district of Trois-Rivières against Premier Maurice Duplessis. Duplessis was re-elected.

== Member of Parliament ==
He ran as a Liberal candidate in 1953 in the district of Trois-Rivières and in 1958 in the district of Champlain. Each time he lost.

He won as an independent candidate in the district of Trois-Rivières in the 1965 federal election. He was re-elected in 1968 as a Liberal.

1968 Canadian federal election: Trois-Rivières
Party	Candidate	Votes	%	±%
Liberal	Joseph-Alfred Mongrain	17,592	46.2	+12.6
Progressive Conservative	Gilles Gauthier	10,501	27.6	+12.4
Ralliement créditiste	Émile Fréchette	7,305	19.2	+11.3
New Democratic	Philippe Daviault	1,724	4.5	+2.2
Independent	Gaston Pelletier	566	1.5	
Independent	Lucien Bornais	364	1.0	
Total valid votes		38,052	100.0	

1965 Canadian federal election: Trois-Rivières
Party	Candidate	Votes	%	±%
Independent	Joseph-Alfred Mongrain	12,927	40.9	
Liberal	Pierre Garceau	10,617	33.6	-6.5
Progressive Conservative	Jean Méthot	4,799	15.2	-29.5
Ralliement créditiste	Philippe Daviault	2,488	7.9	-5.1
New Democratic	Joseph Rivard	749	2.4	+0.2
Total valid votes		31,580	100.0	

Note: Ralliement créditiste vote is compared to Social Credit vote in the 1963 election.

== Death ==
Mongrain died in office on 23 December 1970.

== Footnotes ==
Parliament of Canada
Preceded by Léon Balcer, Progressive Conservative	MP, District of Trois-Rivières; 1965–1970	Succeeded by Claude Lajoie, Liberal
Political offices
Preceded by Arthur Rousseau	Mayor of Trois-Rivières; 1949–1953	Succeeded by Léo Leblanc
Preceded by Laurent Paradis	Mayor of Trois-Rivières; 1960–1963	Succeeded by Gérard Dufresne
