= Léon Balcer =

Canadian politician (1917–1991)

The Honourable Léon Balcer PC
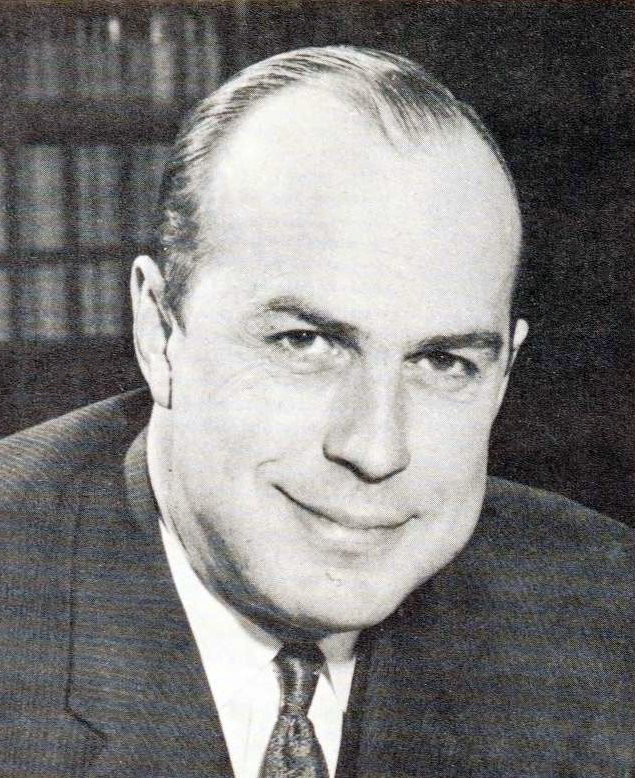

Member of the Canadian Parliament for Trois-Rivières
- In office 1949–1965
- Preceded by: Wilfrid Gariépy
- Succeeded by: Joseph-Alfred Mongrain

Personal details
- Born: October 13, 1917 Trois-Rivières, Quebec, Canada
- Died: March 22, 1991 (aged 73) Sainte-Foy, Quebec, Canada
- Party: Progressive Conservative (1949–1965); Independent (1965)
- Cabinet: Solicitor General of Canada (1957–1960); Minister of Mines and Technical Surveys (Acting) (1957); Secretary of State of Canada (Acting) (1960); Minister of Transport (1960–1963); Secretary of State of Canada (Acting) (1962)

Léon Balcer, PC (October 13, 1917 – March 22, 1991) was a Canadian politician.

He was born in Trois-Rivières, Quebec, and was a lawyer by profession.

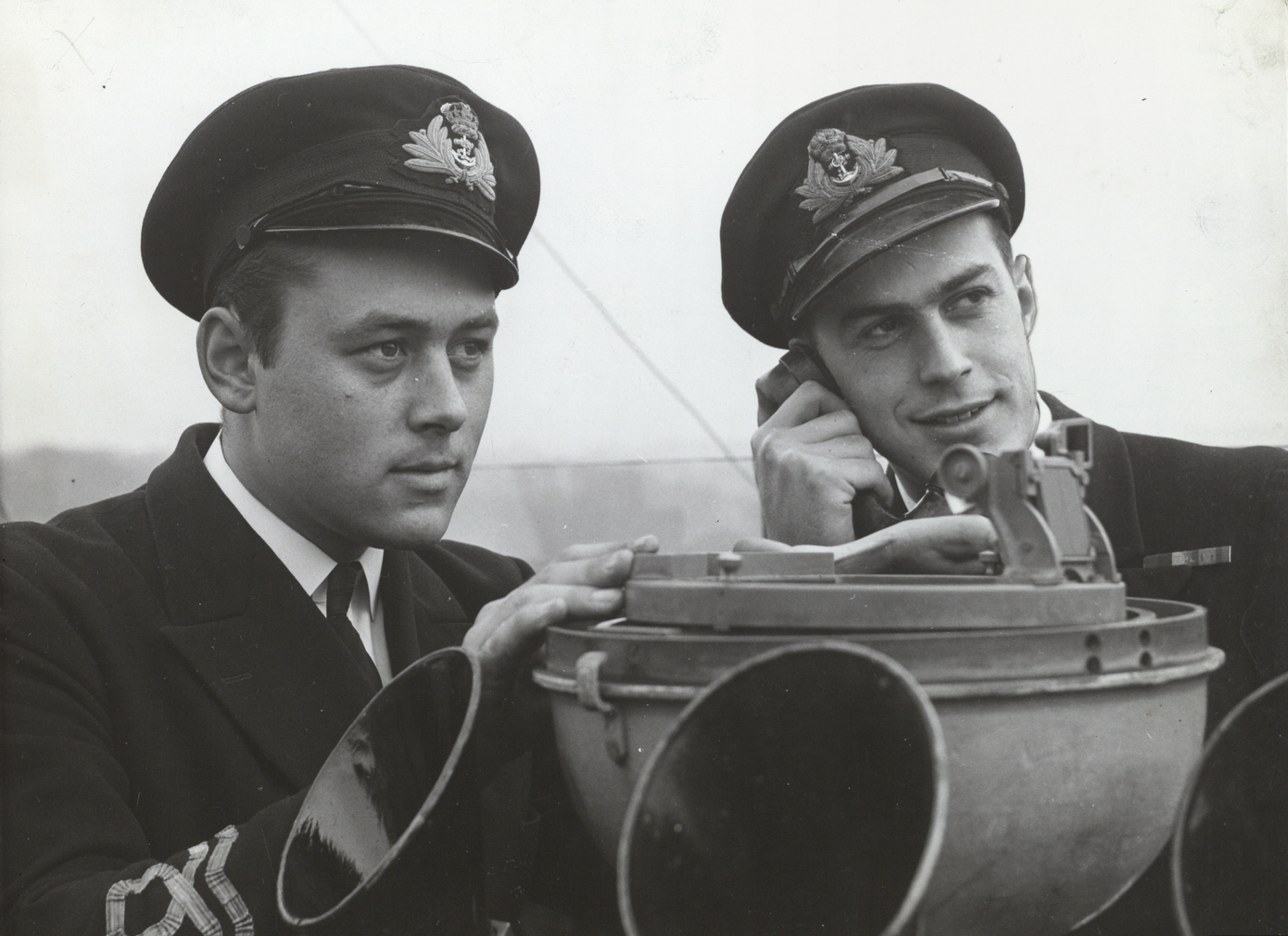
Léon Balcer (right)

== Member of the House of Commons ==
He was one of only three Progressive Conservative (or PC) candidates who were elected to the House of Commons in 1949 from Quebec, representing the district of Trois-Rivières. He was re-elected in the elections of 1953, 1957, 1958, 1962, and 1963. He sat with the Government of Canada from 1957 to 1963 and with Official Opposition from 1949 to 1957 and 1963 to 1965.

Balcer held numerous ministerial positions in the cabinet of Prime Minister John Diefenbaker, including Solicitor General of Canada (1957–1960), and Minister of Transport (1960–1963). He also briefly acted as Minister of Mines and Technical Surveys (Acting), and Secretary of State of Canada (Acting).

During John Diefenbaker's leadership of the Progressive Conservative Party, Balcer was his Quebec lieutenant and Deputy Leader of the PC Party.

A few months before the 1965 election, he left his party and sat as an independent, saying, "there is no place for a French Canadian in the party of Mr. Diefenbaker." In 1964, he had led a small group of PC MPs who broke with Diefenbaker and supported a new flag of Canada during the flag debate championed by the Liberal prime minister, Lester B. Pearson. He did not run for re-election in that year.

== Provincial politics ==
Balcer ran as a Liberal candidate in the district of Trois-Rivières in 1966, but lost to Union Nationale incumbent Yves Gabias.

== Death ==
Balcer died on March 22, 1991.

== Archives ==
There is a Léon Balcer fonds at Library and Archives Canada.
