= Caroline Desrochers =

Canadian politician

Caroline Desrochers MP

Parliamentary Secretary to the Minister of Housing and Infrastructure
- Incumbent
- Assumed office June 5, 2025
- Minister: Gregor Robertson

Member of Parliament for Trois-Rivières
- Incumbent
- Assumed office April 28, 2025
- Preceded by: René Villemure

Personal details
- Born: 1972 or 1973 (age 53–54) Montreal, Quebec
- Party: Liberal
- Spouse: Danny Myint
- Children: 2
- Education: Concordia University (BA); The New School (MA)

Caroline Desrochers is a Canadian politician, diplomat, civil servant, and economist who was elected to the Canadian House of Commons in the 2025 federal election. She represents Trois-Rivières as a member of the Liberal Party.

== Early life, education and career ==
Desrochers grew up in Montreal's South Shore, the younger of two children. Her father was a truck driver, while her mother worked in the restaurant industry. She graduated from Concordia University in 2000 with a Bachelor of Arts in economics, and later completed a Master of Arts in media studies at The New School in New York City. She is fluent in French, English, and Spanish.

Following her undergraduate studies, Desrochers completed a six-month humanitarian internship in Mexico, working with street children. She subsequently began an approximately 25-year career with Global Affairs Canada (GAC) and its predecessor departments, beginning with a two-year posting as a political and public affairs officer at the Canadian embassy in Haiti, where she met her husband.

From 2015 to 2020, Desrochers was posted to the Consulate General of Canada in New York City as Director of Political and Cultural Affairs. Her work on Canada–United States relations spanned approximately a decade. The New York posting coincided with the first administration of U.S. President Donald Trump, during which she worked on the renegotiation of the North American Free Trade Agreement and on the first round of Trump-era tariffs on Canadian goods. The family returned to Canada in 2020 and settled in Chelsea, Quebec.

Following her return to Canada, Desrochers held additional positions at Global Affairs Canada, including a portfolio of bilateral relations with South America and a role leading a departmental Task Force on the Future of Work. At the time she entered electoral politics, she was serving as Director General of Transformation at GAC, a position involving work on the department's organizational modernization.

== Political career ==
In the 2021 federal election, Desrochers ran as the Liberal candidate in the riding of La Prairie. She was defeated by Bloc Québécois incumbent Alain Therrien.

On April 1, 2025, Desrochers was named the Liberal candidate for Trois-Rivières. Later that month, she was elected to the House of Commons, unseating Bloc Québécois incumbent René Villemure. Her victory marked the first Liberal win in the riding since 1984 and the first time since 1993 that Trois-Rivières was represented by a member of the governing party.

On June 5, 2025, Desrochers was appointed Parliamentary Secretary to the Minister of Housing and Infrastructure by the Prime Minister of Canada. On June 13, 2025, Desrochers was named a member of the Standing Committee on Human Resources, Skills and Social Development and the Status of Persons with Disabilities (HUMA).

During the 45th Parliament, Desrochers was also appointed to six parliamentary associations and interparliamentary groups: the Canada–Europe Parliamentary Association, the Canadian NATO Parliamentary Association, the Canadian Branch of the Assemblée parlementaire de la Francophonie, the Canada–United States Inter-Parliamentary Group, the Canadian Section of ParlAmericas, and the Canadian Delegation to the Organization for Security and Co-operation in Europe Parliamentary Assembly.

== Personal life ==
Desrochers and her husband, Danny Myint, have two children.

== Electoral record ==
2025 Canadian federal election: Trois-Rivières
Party	Candidate	Votes	%	±%	Expenditures
Liberal	Caroline Desrochers	25,147	41.01	+12.38	$83,125.57
Bloc Québécois	René Villemure	16,921	27.60	−1.89	$33,855.86
Conservative	Yves Levesque	16,708	27.25	−2.10	$67,897.19
New Democratic	Matthew Sévigny	1,437	2.34	−5.71	$0.00
Green	David Turcotte	569	0.93	−0.37	$0.00
People's	Yan Patry	320	0.52	−1.40	$18.03
Rhinoceros	Mathieu Doyon	215	0.35	N/A	$0.00
Total valid votes/expense limit		61,317	98.32	–	$137,453.86
Total rejected ballots		1,046	1.68	-0.37	
Turnout		62,363	68.11	+3.91	
Eligible voters		91,563			
Liberal gain from Bloc Québécois		Swing		+7.14	
Source: Elections Canada
Note: number of eligible voters does not include voting day registrations.

2021 Canadian federal election: La Prairie
Party	Candidate	Votes	%	±%	Expenditures
Bloc Québécois	Alain Therrien	25,862	43.73	+1.9	$27,187.05
Liberal	Caroline Desrochers	20,470	34.61	-2.0	$64,263.73
Conservative	Lise des Greniers	5,878	9.94	+0.9	$4,378.21
New Democratic	Victoria Hernandez	4,317	7.30	-0.4	$24.86
People's	Ruth Fontaine	1,532	2.59	+2.0	$2,454.19
Green	Barbara Joannette	983	1.66	-2.5	$0.00
Marxist–Leninist	Normand Chouinard	98	0.17	±0.0	$0.00
Total valid votes/expense limit		59,140	98.46	–	$117,466.66
Total rejected ballots		924	1.54	1.17	
Turnout		60,064	67.79	-4.2	
Registered voters		88,603			
Source: Elections Canada
