= Léon Méthot =

Canadian politician (1895–1972)

Senator for Shawinegan, Quebec
- In office 12 October 1957 – 6 August 1972
- Preceded by: Charles-Édouard Ferland
- Succeeded by: Maurice Riel

Personal details
- Born: 13 May 1895 Trois-Rivières, Quebec, Canada
- Died: 6 August 1972 (aged 77)
- Party: Progressive Conservative
- Spouse: Hortense Normand
- Profession: lawyer

Léon Méthot (13 May 1895 – 6 August 1972) was a Progressive Conservative Party member of the Senate of Canada. He was born in Trois-Rivières, Quebec and became a lawyer.

The son of Georges Méthot and E. Rousseau, he was educated at the Séminaire de Trois-Rivières and the Université Laval, was called to the Quebec bar in 1919 and practised in Trois-Rivières. In 1929, he was named King's Counsel.

Méthot made attempts to gain a House of Commons of Canada seat at the Three Rivers riding, first as a Conservative in the 1935 election then as a Progressive Conservative in the 1945 election. He was unsuccessful with both these campaigns.

He was appointed to the Senate for the Shawinigan, Quebec division on 12 October 1957 following nomination by Prime Minister John Diefenbaker. Méthot remained in that role until his death on 6 August 1972.
