= Paule Brunelle =

Canadian politician

Member of Parliament for Trois-Rivières
- In office 2004–2011
- Preceded by: Yves Rocheleau
- Succeeded by: Robert Aubin

Personal details
- Born: August 21, 1953 (age 72) Trois-Rivières, Quebec, Canada
- Party: Bloc Québécois
- Profession: businesswoman

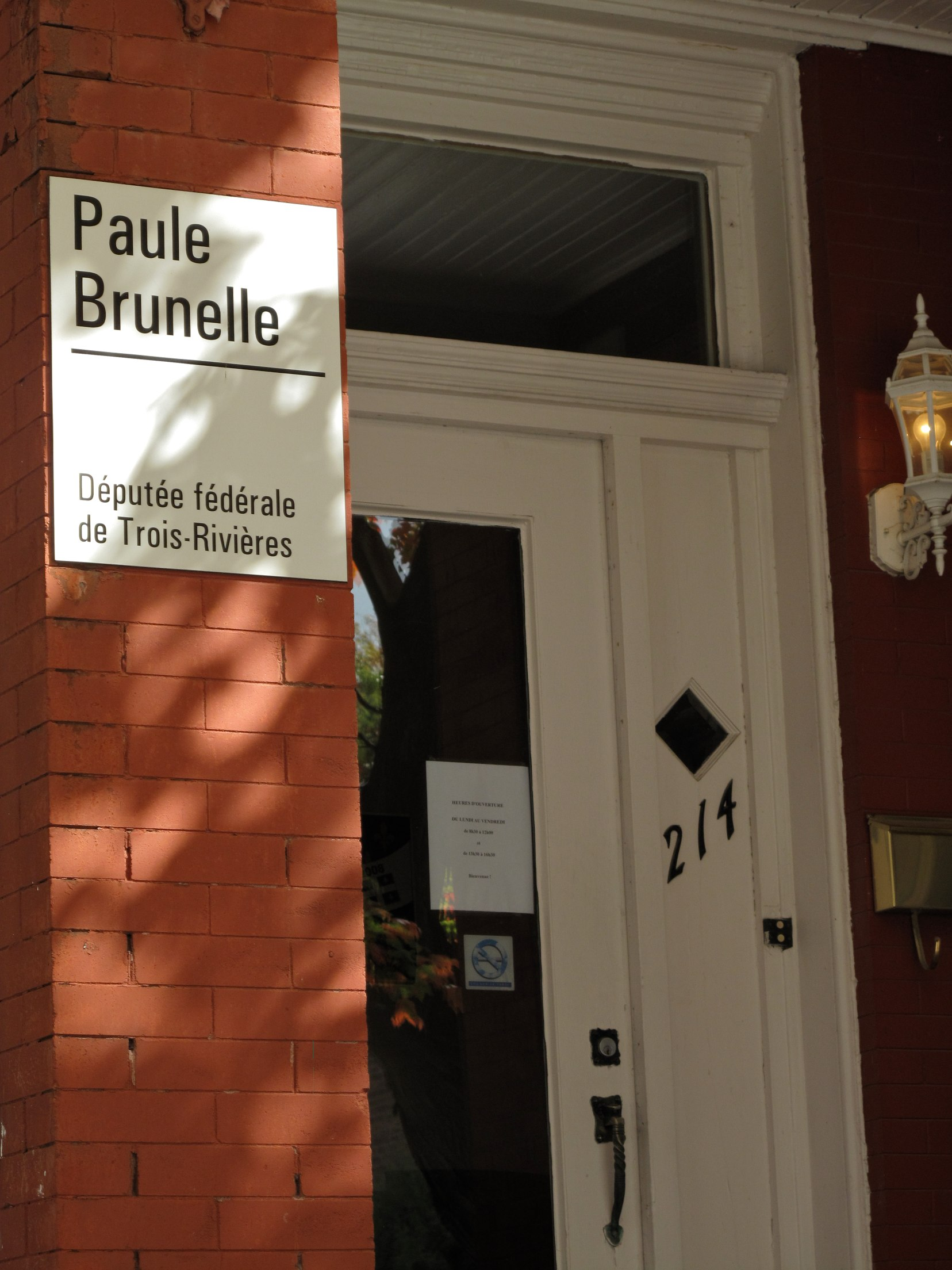
The riding office of Paule Brunelle.

Paule Brunelle (born August 21, 1953) is a Canadian politician. She was the Bloc Québécois member of the House of Commons of Canada from the riding of Trois-Rivières from 2004 to 2011. She was the Bloc critic on Intergovernmental Affairs and Industry. Born in Trois-Rivières, Quebec, Brunelle is a businesswoman and an executive director.
