= Yves Lévesque =

Canadian politician (born 1957)

His Worship Yves Lévesque
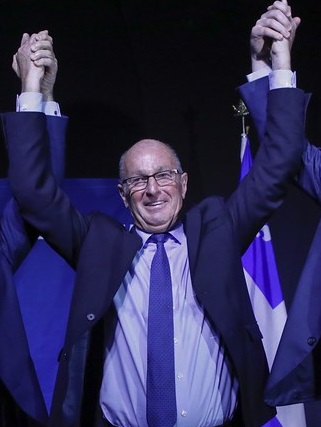

Mayor of Shawinigan
- Incumbent
- Assumed office November 12, 2025
- Preceded by: Michel Angers

Mayor of Trois-Rivières
- In office November 4, 2001 – December 27, 2018
- Preceded by: Guy Leblanc
- Succeeded by: Jean Lamarche

Personal details
- Born: 1957 (age 68–69)
- Party: Conservative (federal); Conservative (provincial; 2021–present)
- Other political affiliations: CAQ (provincial; after 2003, before 2021); Parti Québécois (provincial; before 2003)

Yves Lévesque (French pronunciation: [iv levɛ(s)k]; born 1957) is a Canadian politician who has been the mayor of Shawinigan since 2025. He previously served as Mayor of Trois-Rivières between 2001 and 2018.

== Career ==
=== City Councillor ===
Lévesque won his first electoral victory in 1994, when he became city councillor in Trois-Rivières-Ouest. He was re-elected in 1998.

=== Mayor of Trois-Rivières ===
In the wake of the province-wide municipal merging of 2001, he ran for Mayor of Trois-Rivières and won an upset victory against favourite candidate and Cap-de-la-Madeleine Mayor Alain Croteau. In the 2003 provincial election, he campaigned in favour of the re-election of Parti Québécois incumbent Guy Julien, who lost.

In 2005, Julien ran against Lévesque for mayor, but the incumbent was easily re-elected with 70% of the vote.

Recently, Lévesque has been trying to get the Trois-Rivières Draveurs, a franchise of the Quebec Major Junior Hockey League, back in town.

On December 27, 2018, Lévesque announced he was retiring as mayor for medical reasons.

=== Federal politics ===
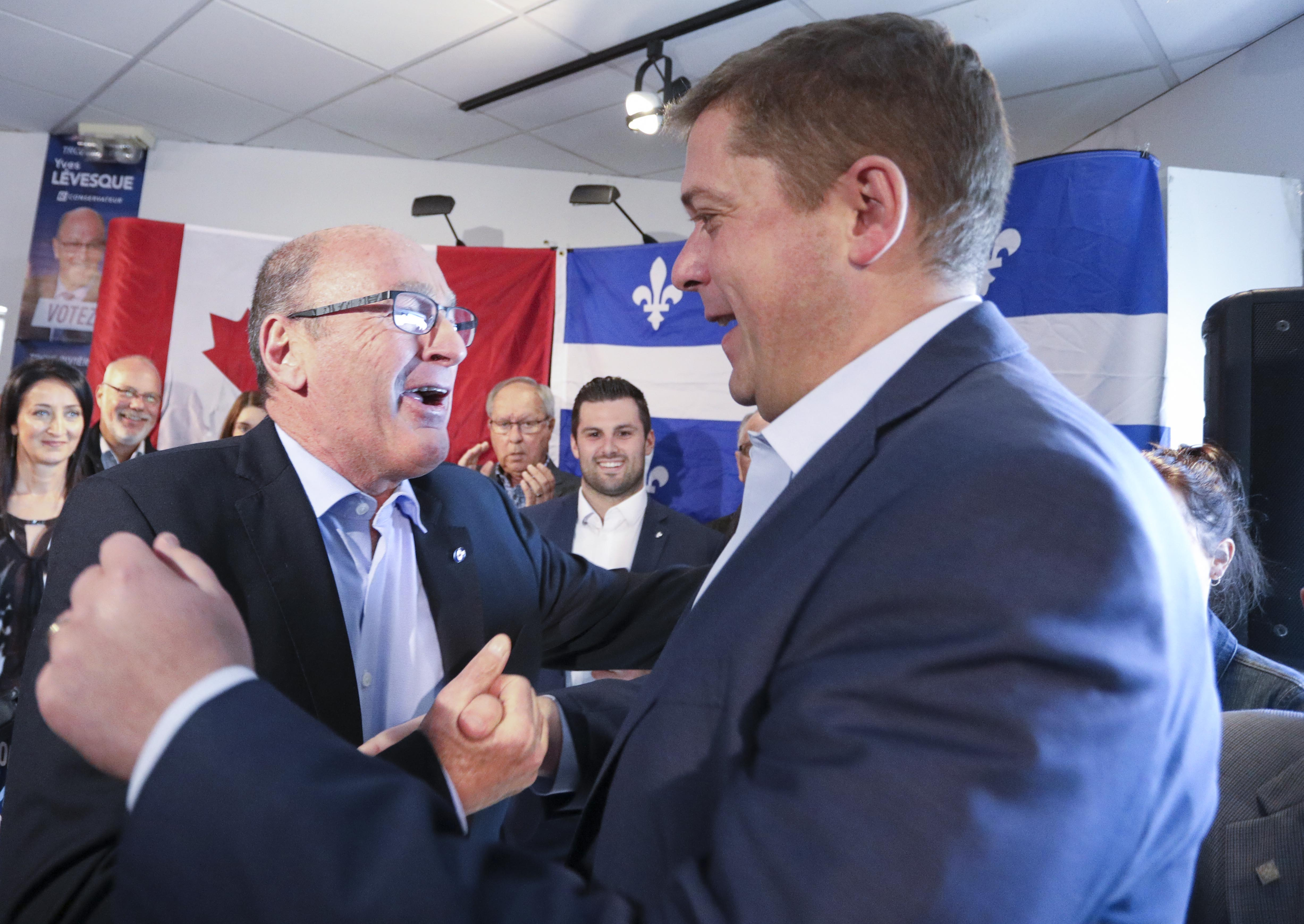
Lévesque with Andrew Scheer in 2019

Lévesque officially joined the Conservative Party of Canada in May 2018, taking out a party membership and speaking at the party's convention in Saint-Hyacinthe. He stated at the time that he was considering running for the party in the 43rd election. He joined the Conservative Party because of its stated goal of decentralizing power to the provinces.

On May 30, 2019, Lévesque was named the Conservative candidate for the riding of Trois-Rivières. During the race, he was expected to win; however, he lost the race, standing third. Lévesque blamed party leader Andrew Scheer's first French-language debate, wherein Scheer's perceived inability to defend his personal views from the other leaders shifted support from the Conservatives in Quebec, which never recovered.

Lévesque ran in Trois-Rivières again as a Conservative in 2021 and gained 17,027 votes (an increase of 1,787) but came in second.

=== Mayor of Shawinigan ===
Lévesque ran for mayor of Shawinigan in the 2025 Quebec municipal elections, placing first.

== Electoral record ==
=== Federal ===
2025 Canadian federal election: Trois-Rivières
Party	Candidate	Votes	%	±%
Liberal	Caroline Desrochers	25,147	41.01	+12.38
Bloc Québécois	René Villemure	16,921	27.60	−1.89
Conservative	Yves Levesque	16,708	27.25	−2.10
New Democratic	Matthew Sévigny	1,437	2.34	−5.71
Green	David Turcotte	569	0.93	−0.37
People's	Yan Patry	320	0.52	−1.40
Rhinoceros	Mathieu Doyon	215	0.35	N/A
Total valid votes/expense limit		61,317	98.32	
Total rejected ballots		1,046	1.68	-0.37
Turnout		62,363	68.11	+3.91
Eligible voters		91,563		
Liberal gain from Bloc Québécois		Swing		+7.14
Source: Elections Canada
Note: number of eligible voters does not include voting day registrations.

2021 Canadian federal election: Trois-Rivières
Party	Candidate	Votes	%	±%	Expenditures
Bloc Québécois	René Villemure	17,136	29.49	+1.01	$16,854.26
Conservative	Yves Lévesque	17,053	29.35	+4.17	$40,285.49
Liberal	Martin Francoeur	16,637	28.63	+2.57	$80,504.68
New Democratic	Adis Simidzija	4,680	8.05	-8.61	$4,281.85
People's	Jean Landry	1,115	1.92	+0.99	$0.00
Green	Andrew Holman	754	1.30	-1.17	$0.00
Free	Gilles Brodeur	735	1.26	–	$1,244.68
Total valid votes/expense limit		58,110	97.95	–	$120,485.08
Total rejected ballots		1,214	2.05	–	
Turnout		59,324	64.19	-2.53	
Eligible voters		92,413			
Bloc Québécois hold		Swing		-1.58	
Source: Elections Canada

2019 Canadian federal election: Trois-Rivières
Party	Candidate	Votes	%	±%	Expenditures
Bloc Québécois	Louise Charbonneau	17,240	28.48	+11.48	$19,118.47
Liberal	Valérie Renaud-Martin	15,774	26.06	-4.16	$59,713.01
Conservative	Yves Lévesque	15,240	25.17	+6.54	none listed
New Democratic	Robert Aubin	10,090	16.67	-15.16	none listed
Green	Marie Duplessis	1,492	2.46	+0.75	none listed
People's	Marc-André Gingras	565	0.93	–	$5,574.25
Independent	Ronald St-Onge Lynch	137	0.23	–	$0.00
Total valid votes/expense limit		60,538	100.0		
Total rejected ballots		1,092	1.77		
Turnout		61,630	66.73		
Eligible voters		92,362			
Bloc Québécois gain from New Democratic		Swing		+7.82	
Source: Elections Canada

=== Municipal (mayoral) ===
==== 2017 ====
Mayoral candidate	Vote	%
Yves Lévesque (X)	26,503	51.37
Jean-François Aubin	23,252	45.07
André Bertrand	1,837	3.56

==== 2013 ====
Party	Mayoral candidate	Vote	%
Independent	Yves Lévesque (X)	29,204	49.25
Independent	Sylvie Tardif	18,491	31.18
Independent	Catherine Dufresne	8,324	14.04
Independent	Marcelle Girard	1,609	2.71
Force 3R	Richard St-Germain	1,321	2.23
Independent	Pierre Benoit Fortin	352	0.59

==== 2009 ====
Candidate	Party	Vote	%
Yves Lévesque (X)	Independent	25,637	54.9
André Carle	Force 3R	21,077	45.1

==== 2005 ====
Candidate	Vote	%
Yves Lévesque (inc.)	34,298	70.3
Guy Julien	13,741	28.2
Serge Simard	754	1.5
