= Charles Bourgeois =

Canadian politician

The Hon. Charles Bourgeois

Senator for Shawinegan, Quebec
- In office 1935–1940
- Appointed by: R. B. Bennett
- Preceded by: Philippe-Jacques Paradis
- Succeeded by: Charles-Édouard Ferland

Member of the Canadian Parliament for Three Rivers and St. Maurice
- In office 1931–1935
- Preceded by: Arthur Bettez
- Succeeded by: District was abolished in 1933

Personal details
- Born: July 29, 1879 Trois-Rivières, Quebec, Canada
- Died: May 15, 1940 (aged 60)
- Party: Conservative

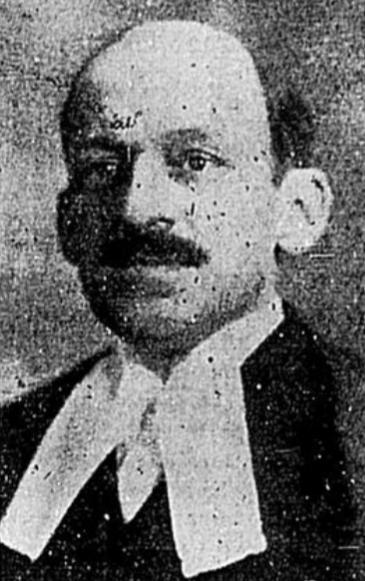
Charles Bourgeois

Charles Bourgeois (July 29, 1879 – May 15, 1940) was a politician in the Quebec, Canada. He served as a Member of Parliament and as a Senator.

== Early life ==
He was born on July 29, 1879, in Trois-Rivières, Mauricie. He was an attorney.

== Member of Parliament ==
He ran as a Conservative candidate to the House of Commons of Canada in 1926 in the district of Nicolet but lost. He won a seat in the district of Three Rivers and St. Maurice in a 1931 by-election, but did not run for re-election in 1935.

== Senator ==
In 1935, Bourgeois was appointed to the Canadian Senate on the advice of Prime Minister Richard Bedford Bennett and served until his death. He represented the division of Shawinegan.

== Death ==
He died in office on May 15, 1940.

== Electoral record ==
By-election on 10 August 1931
Party	Candidate	Votes
Conservative	Charles Bourgeois	13,539
Liberal	Wilfrid Gariépy	13,501
