= Michel Bellehumeur =

Canadian politician (born 1963)

Member of the Canadian Parliament for Berthier—Montcalm
- In office October 25, 1993 – May 18, 2002
- Preceded by: Robert de Cotret
- Succeeded by: Roger Gaudet

Personal details
- Born: January 21, 1963 (age 63) Louiseville, Quebec, Canada
- Party: Bloc Québécois
- Portfolio: Deputy House Leader of the Official Opposition (1994-1996 & 1997); Bloc Québécois Deputy House Leader (1994-1996 & 1997)

Michel Bellehumeur (born January 21, 1963) is a Canadian politician from Quebec. He was the Bloc Québécois Member of Parliament for the riding of Berthier—Montcalm.

== Biography ==
Born in Louiseville, Quebec, Bellehumeur had always been a Quebec nationalist, but was previously a member of the Liberal Party of Canada, serving as the official agent for the Liberal candidate in Berthier—Montcalm in the 1988 election. In an interview, he told the Toronto Star that "he saw Quebec's future within Canada until the 1992 referendum on the Charlottetown accord, rejected in both English Canada and Quebec".

He was first elected in 1993, in which the Bloc Québécois became the official opposition. During the 35th Canadian Parliament, Bellehumeur built the reputation of being a fighter. "At one point during parliamentary debate before the 1995 Quebec referendum," wrote Paul Wells in the Montreal Gazette "Liberal MP Patrick Gagnon invited Bellehumeur to step outside the House and settle an argument the two were having. Days after the referendum, Bellehumeur was kicked out of the House for accusing Deputy Prime Minister Sheila Copps of lying - an accusation that happened at that moment to be true, but was unparliamentary anyway". In 1996, Bellehumeur was promoted by the BQ's then-leader Michel Gauthier as shadow critic for Intergovernmental Affairs, a position that allowed Bellehumeur to represent the BQ's position for post-referendum Quebec.

He was re-elected in 1997 and 2000. From 1994 to 1996 and in 1997, he was the Deputy House Leader of the Official Opposition and Bloc Québécois Deputy House Leader. He resigned on May 18, 2002.

In 2004, Bellehumeur was named as judge in the Montreal district by the Court of Quebec.
