= Berthier—Montcalm =

Former federal electoral district in Quebec, Canada

Quebec electoral district

Defunct federal electoral district
- Legislature: House of Commons
- District created: 1987
- District abolished: 2003
- First contested: 1988
- Last contested: 2002 by-election

Berthier—Montcalm was a federal electoral district in Quebec, Canada, that was represented in the House of Commons of Canada from 1988 to 2004.

This riding was created in 1987 from Berthier—Maskinongé—Lanaudière riding. It was abolished in 2003 when it was redistributed into Berthier—Maskinongé, Laurentides—Labelle, Montcalm and Rivière-du-Nord ridings.

Berthier—Montcalm consisted of the towns of Berthierville, Louiseville and Saint-Gabriel; parts of the Counties of Berthier, Joliette, Maskinongé, Montcalm, and Saint-Maurice. In 1996, the riding was redefined to consist of the cities of Berthierville, Laurentides and Saint-Gabriel, the county regional municipalities of Montcalm, D'Autray and Matawinie (including Manouane Indian Reserve No. 26), and the Village Municipality of New Glasgow and the Municipality of Sainte-Sophie in the County Regional Municipality of La Rivière-du-Nord.

== Members of Parliament ==
This riding has elected the following members of Parliament:

Parliament	Years	Member	Party
Berthier—Montcalm; Riding created from Berthier—Maskinongé—Lanaudière
34th	1988–1993	Robert de Cotret	Progressive Conservative
35th	1993–1997	Michel Bellehumeur	Bloc Québécois
36th	1997–2000	Michel Bellehumeur	Bloc Québécois
37th	2000–2002	Michel Bellehumeur	Bloc Québécois
37th	2002–2004	Roger Gaudet	Bloc Québécois
Riding dissolved into Berthier—Maskinongé, Laurentides—Labelle, Montcalm and Rivière-du-Nord

== Electoral history ==
1988 Canadian federal election
Party	Candidate	Votes	%	±%
Progressive Conservative	Robert de Cotret	29,370		
Liberal	Maurice Roberge	13,624		
New Democratic	Pierre Arès	5,883		
Green	Roberte Sylvestre	2,084		
No affiliation	Antonio Yanakis	1,292		

1993 Canadian federal election
Party	Candidate	Votes	%	±%
Bloc Québécois	Michel Bellehumeur	36,065		
Liberal	Madeleine Bélanger	16,133		
Progressive Conservative	Réal Naud	5,358		
Natural Law	Réal Croteau	804		
New Democratic	Jean-Pierre de Billy	591		
National	Laurent Harvey	276		

1997 Canadian federal election
Party	Candidate	Votes	%	±%
Bloc Québécois	Michel Bellehumeur	32,707		
Liberal	Lise Perreault	15,073		
Progressive Conservative	Réal Naud	13,338		
New Democratic	Jean-Pierre de Billy	1,009		

2000 Canadian federal election
Party	Candidate	Votes	%	±%
Bloc Québécois	Michel Bellehumeur	31,703		
Liberal	Jean-Carle Hudon	16,675		
Alliance	Réal Naud	2,853		
Progressive Conservative	Paul Lavigne	2,014		
Marijuana	Sébastien Hénault	1,460		
New Democratic	Jean-Pierre de Billy	829		

By-election on Mr. Bellehumeur's resignation, 18 May 2002:
Party	Candidate	Votes	%	±%
Bloc Québécois	Roger Gaudet	13,747		
Liberal	Richard Giroux	11,646		
New Democratic	François Rivest	977		
Progressive Conservative	Richard Lafleur	598		
Alliance	Réal Naud	475		

== See also ==
- List of Canadian electoral districts
- Historical federal electoral districts of Canada
