= Three Rivers and St. Maurice =

Former federal electoral district in Quebec, Canada

Coordinates: 46.4°N 72.5°W

Quebec electoral district

Defunct federal electoral district
- Legislature: House of Commons
- District created: 1892
- District abolished: 1933
- First contested: 1896
- Last contested: 1931 by-election

Three Rivers and St. Maurice (French: Trois-Rivières-et-Saint-Maurice; also known as Three Rivers—St. Maurice) was a federal electoral district in Quebec, Canada, that was represented in the House of Commons of Canada from 1892 to 1935.

This riding was created as "Three Rivers and St. Maurice" riding in 1892 from Three Rivers and Saint Maurice ridings. It was renamed "Three Rivers—St. Maurice" in 1924 and defined to consist of the Cities of Three Rivers and Shawinigan Falls and the County of St. Maurice.

The electoral district was abolished in 1933 when it was redistributed into St-Maurice—Laflèche and Three Rivers ridings.

== Members of Parliament ==
This riding elected the following members of Parliament:

Parliament	Years	Member	Party
Three Rivers and St. Maurice; Riding created from Three Rivers and Saint Maurice
8th	1896–1900	Adolphe-Philippe Caron	Conservative
9th	1900–1904	Jacques Bureau	Liberal
10th	1904–1907	Jacques Bureau	Liberal
10th	1907–1908	Jacques Bureau	Liberal
11th	1908–1911	Jacques Bureau	Liberal
12th	1911–1917	Jacques Bureau	Liberal
13th	1917–1921	Jacques Bureau	Opposition (Laurier Liberals)
14th	1921–1922	Jacques Bureau	Liberal
14th	1922–1925	Jacques Bureau	Liberal
Three Rivers—St. Maurice
15th	1925–1926	Arthur Bettez	Liberal
16th	1926–1930	Arthur Bettez	Liberal
17th	1930–1931	Arthur Bettez	Liberal
17th	1931–1935	Charles Bourgeois	Conservative
Riding dissolved into St-Maurice—Laflèche and Three Rivers

== Election results ==
=== Three Rivers and St. Maurice, 1896–1925 ===
1896 Canadian federal election
Party	Candidate	Votes
Conservative	Adolphe-Philippe Caron	1,691
Liberal	L. P. Fiset	1,422

1900 Canadian federal election
Party	Candidate	Votes
Liberal	Jacques Bureau	1,832
Conservative	P. E. Panneton	1,527
Conservative	F. L. Desaulniers	103

1904 Canadian federal election
Party	Candidate	Votes
Liberal	Jacques Bureau	2,667
Conservative	Nérée-L. Duplessis	2,270

By-election: On Mr. Bureau being appointed Solicitor-General of Canada, 14 February 1907

By-election on 28 February 1907
Party	Candidate	Votes
Liberal	Jacques Bureau	acclaimed

1908 Canadian federal election
Party	Candidate	Votes
Liberal	Jacques Bureau	3,139
Conservative	Philippe-Elisée Panneton	1,773

1911 Canadian federal election
Party	Candidate	Votes
Liberal	Jacques Bureau	3,155
Conservative	Louis-Philippe Normand	3,146

1917 Canadian federal election
Party	Candidate	Votes
Opposition (Laurier Liberals)	Jacques Bureau	acclaimed

1921 Canadian federal election
Party	Candidate	Votes
Liberal	Jacques Bureau	13,995
Conservative	Louis-Philippe Normand	6,688

By-election: On Mr. Bureau's acceptance of an office of emolument under the Crown 3 January 1922

By-election on 19 January 1922
Party	Candidate	Votes
Liberal	Jacques Bureau	acclaimed

=== Three Rivers—St. Maurice, 1925–1935 ===
1925 Canadian federal election
Party	Candidate	Votes
Liberal	Arthur Bettez	10,285
Conservative	Louis Normand	6,007
Unknown	Robert Ryan	1,999

1926 Canadian federal election
Party	Candidate	Votes}}
Liberal	Arthur Bettez	11,384
Conservative	Louis Normand	5,737

1930 Canadian federal election
Party	Candidate	Votes}}
Liberal	Arthur Bettez	14,732
Conservative	Louis-D. Durand	11,083

By-election: On Mr. Bettez's death, 4 January 1931

By-election on 10 August 1931
Party	Candidate	Votes
Conservative	Charles Bourgeois	13,539
Liberal	Wilfrid Gariépy	13,501

== See also ==
- List of Canadian electoral districts
- Mauricie
- Historical federal electoral districts of Canada
