= Louise Charbonneau (politician) =

Canadian politician

Member of Parliament for Trois-Rivières
- In office October 21, 2019 – September 19, 2021
- Preceded by: Robert Aubin
- Succeeded by: René Villemure

Personal details
- Born: January 31, 1951 (age 75) Trois-Rivières, Quebec
- Party: Bloc Québécois
- Profession: Teacher

Louise Charbonneau (French pronunciation: [lwiz ʃaʁbɔno]; born January 31, 1951) is a Canadian politician, who was elected to the House of Commons of Canada in the 2019 election from Trois-Rivières as a member of the Bloc Québécois.

In January 2021, she announced she would not run again in the federal election later that year.

== Electoral record ==
2019 Canadian federal election: Trois-Rivières
Party	Candidate	Votes	%	±%	Expenditures
Bloc Québécois	Louise Charbonneau	17,240	28.48	+11.48	$19,118.47
Liberal	Valérie Renaud-Martin	15,774	26.06	-4.16	$59,713.01
Conservative	Yves Lévesque	15,240	25.17	+6.54	none listed
New Democratic	Robert Aubin	10,090	16.67	-15.16	none listed
Green	Marie Duplessis	1,492	2.46	+0.75	none listed
People's	Marc-André Gingras	565	0.93	–	$5,574.25
Independent	Ronald St-Onge Lynch	137	0.23	–	$0.00
Total valid votes/expense limit		60,538	100.0		
Total rejected ballots		1,092	1.77		
Turnout		61,630	66.73		
Eligible voters		92,362			
Bloc Québécois gain from New Democratic		Swing		+7.82	
Source: Elections Canada
