= Robert Aubin =

Canadian politician

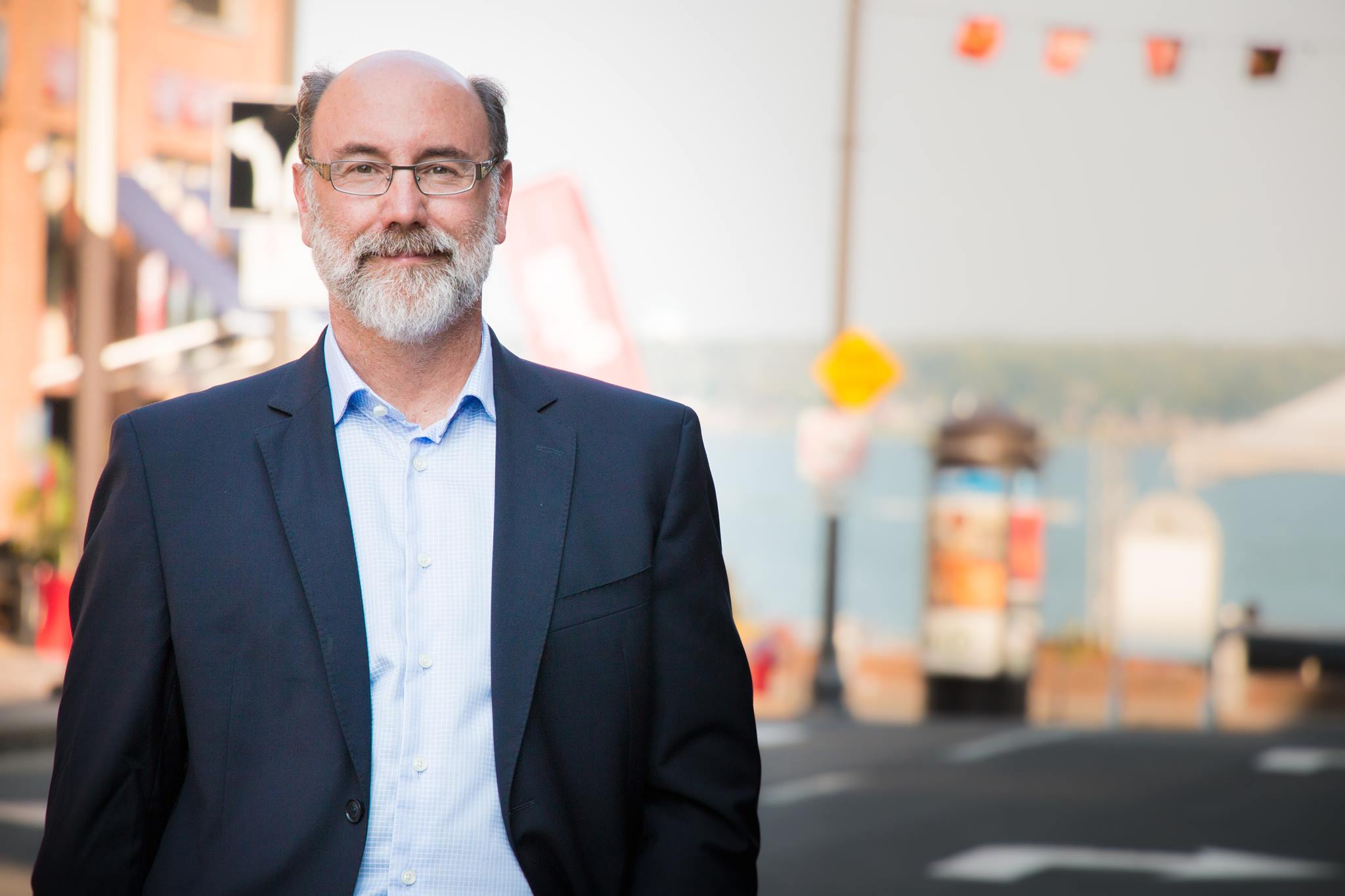

Member of Parliament for Trois-Rivières
- In office May 2, 2011 – September 11, 2019
- Preceded by: Paule Brunelle
- Succeeded by: Louise Charbonneau

Personal details
- Born: May 26, 1960 (age 66) Trois-Rivières, Quebec
- Party: New Democratic Party
- Education: Université du Québec à Trois-Rivières; Université Laval
- Profession: Musician, teacher, politician

Robert Aubin (born May 26, 1960) is a Canadian politician who served as the Member of Parliament for the riding of Trois-Rivières from 2011 to 2019 as a member of the New Democratic Party.

== Background and education ==
Born in Trois-Rivières, Quebec, Aubin has a diploma in geography from Université Laval and a degree in music and education from the Université du Québec à Trois-Rivières.

At the time of his election, he had been a teacher at the Séminaire St-Joseph for nearly 25 years. He has also been a musician.

== Political career ==
Aubin was first elected to the House of Commons of Canada in the 2011 election and was re-elected in 2015. After the 2015 election, Aubin was appointed the NDP critic for International development and La Francophonie in the 42nd Canadian Parliament.

In the 2012 NDP leadership election, he supported Tom Mulcair. In the 2017 NDP leadership election, Aubin initially supported Peter Julian, then switched his support to Guy Caron after Julian withdrew from the race.

Aubin lost his seat in the 2019 federal election, falling to fourth place.

== Electoral record ==
2019 Canadian federal election: Trois-Rivières
| Party | Candidate | Votes | % | ±% | Expenditures |
|---|---|---|---|---|---|
| Bloc Québécois | Louise Charbonneau | 17,240 | 28.48 | +11.48 | $19,118.47 |
| Liberal | Valérie Renaud-Martin | 15,774 | 26.06 | -4.16 | $59,713.01 |
| Conservative | Yves Lévesque | 15,240 | 25.17 | +6.54 | none listed |
| New Democratic | Robert Aubin | 10,090 | 16.67 | -15.16 | none listed |
| Green | Marie Duplessis | 1,492 | 2.46 | +0.75 | none listed |
| People's | Marc-André Gingras | 565 | 0.93 | – | $5,574.25 |
| Independent | Ronald St-Onge Lynch | 137 | 0.23 | – | $0.00 |
| Total valid votes/expense limit | | 60,538 | 100.0 | | |
| Total rejected ballots | | 1,092 | 1.77 | | |
| Turnout | | 61,630 | 66.73 | | |
| Eligible voters | | 92,362 | | | |
| Bloc Québécois gain from New Democratic | | Swing | | +7.82 | |
Source: Elections Canada

2015 Canadian federal election
| Party | Candidate | Votes | % | ±% | Expenditures |
|---|---|---|---|---|---|
| New Democratic | Robert Aubin | 19,193 | 31.83 | -17.87 | $59,109.30 |
| Liberal | Yvon Boivin | 18,224 | 30.22 | +20.19 | $33,318.95 |
| Conservative | Dominic Therrien | 11,231 | 18.63 | +5.48 | $88,781.37 |
| Bloc Québécois | André Valois | 10,249 | 17.00 | -7.21 | $37,874.56 |
| Green | Éric Trottier | 1,032 | 1.71 | -0.18 | – |
| Libertarian | Maxime Rousseau | 360 | 0.6 | – | – |
| Total valid votes/Expense limit | | 60,289 | 100.0 | | $232,803.19 |
| Total rejected ballots | | 940 | – | – | |
| Turnout | | 61,229 | – | – | |
| Eligible voters | | 90,900 | | | |
Source: Elections Canada

2011 Canadian federal election
| Party | Candidate | Votes | % | ±% | Expenditures |
|---|---|---|---|---|---|
| New Democratic | Robert Aubin | 26,981 | 53.57 | +44.39 | |
| Bloc Québécois | Paule Brunelle | 11,987 | 23.80 | -21.46 | |
| Conservative | Pierre Lacroix | 6,205 | 12.32 | -11.92 | |
| Liberal | Patrice Mangin | 3,617 | 7.18 | -11.01 | |
| Green | Louis Lacroix | 972 | 1.93 | -1.18 | |
| Independent | Marc-André Fortin | 346 | 0.69 | – | |
| Rhinoceros | Francis Arsenault | 256 | 0.51 | – | |
| Total valid votes/Expense limit | | 50,364 | 100.00 | | |
| Total rejected ballots | | 889 | 1.73 | – | |
| Turnout | | 51,253 | 64.59 | – | |
| Eligible voters | | 79,346 | – | – | |
