= Claude Lajoie =

Canadian politician (1928–2015)

Claude G. Lajoie

9th Gentleman Usher of the Black Rod
- In office July 1984 – July 1985
- Preceded by: Thomas Guy Bowie
- Succeeded by: René Jalbert

Member of the Canadian Parliament for Trois-Rivières
- In office 1971–1984
- Preceded by: Joseph-Alfred Mongrain
- Succeeded by: Pierre H. Vincent

Personal details
- Born: 26 January 1928 Trois-Rivières, Quebec
- Died: 15 May 2015 (aged 87) Trois-Rivières, Quebec
- Party: Liberal Party of Canada
- Spouse: Leonore E. Wiren
- Children: Cindy
- Occupation: Building contractor, businessman

Claude G. Lajoie (26 January 1928 – 15 May 2015) was a Liberal party member of the House of Commons of Canada. He was a businessman and building contractor by career.

Born in Trois-Rivières, he represented Quebec's Trois-Rivières electoral district since his victory there in a by-election on 31 May 1971. He was re-elected in the 1972, 1974, 1979 and 1980 federal elections. After serving consecutive terms from the 28th through the 32nd Canadian Parliaments, Lajoie left national politics and did not campaign in the 1984 election.
