= Roger Gaudet =

Canadian politician

Member of Parliament for Montcalm (Berthier—Montcalm; 2002–2004)
- In office December 9, 2002 – May 2, 2011
- Preceded by: Michel Bellehumeur
- Succeeded by: Manon Perreault

Personal details
- Born: May 26, 1945 (age 80) Saint-Liguori, Quebec, Canada
- Party: Bloc Québécois
- Profession: Restaurateur

Roger Gaudet (born May 26, 1945) is a Canadian politician and former restaurant owner.

Gaudet served as a councillor in Saint-Liguori from 1985 to 1989. In 1989 he was elected mayor of Saint-Liguoiri, and then in 1993 he became reeve of the Montcalm MRC. In 2002 he was elected to the House of Commons of Canada in a by-election for the Bloc Québécois in the riding Berthier—Montcalm. In the 2004 Canadian federal election he was re-elected- this time in Montcalm. He briefly was the Bloc's critic to Public Works and Government services in 2004.

Gaudet was born in Saint-Liguori, Quebec.

== Electoral record ==
2011 Canadian federal election: Montcalm
Party	Candidate	Votes	%	±%
New Democratic	Manon Perreault	34,434	52.97	+39.12
Bloc Québécois	Roger Gaudet	19,609	30.16	-25.52
Conservative	Jason Fuoco	5,118	7.87	-5.58
Liberal	Yves Dufour	3,501	5.39	-8.55
Green	Marianne Girard	2,347	3.61	+0.53
Total valid votes		65,009	98.21	
Total rejected ballots		1,183	1.79	-0.26
Turnout		66,192	61.47	-0.26
Eligible voters		107,677	–	–
New Democratic gain from Bloc Québécois		Swing		+32.32

2008 Canadian federal election: Montcalm
Party	Candidate	Votes	%	±%	Expenditures
Bloc Québécois	Roger Gaudet	33,519	55.69	-6.59	$73,797
Liberal	David Grégoire	8,387	13.93	+5.66	$7,023
New Democratic	Marie-Josée Beauchamp	8,337	13.85	+7.14	none listed
Conservative	Claude Marc Boudreau	8,096	13.45	-5.81	$79,804
Green	Michel Paulette	1,854	3.08	-0.40	$722
Total valid votes		60,193	97.89		
Total rejected ballots		1,296	2.11	+0.03	
Turnout		61,489	61.73	-1.86	
Electors on the lists		99,604			
Bloc Québécois hold		Swing		-6.13	
Sources: Official Results, Elections Canada and Financial Returns, Elections Canada.

2006 Canadian federal election: Montcalm
Party	Candidate	Votes	%	±%	Expenditures
Bloc Québécois	Roger Gaudet	34,975	62.28	-8.96	
Conservative	Michel Paulette	10,818	19.26	+13.40	$6,764
Liberal	Luc Fortin	4,645	8.27	-8.13	$9,690
New Democratic	Nancy Leclerc	3,766	6.71	+3.53	$0
Green	Wendy Gorchinsky	1,954	3.48	+0.15	
Total		56,158	97.92	–	$86,039
Total rejected ballots		1,193	2.08	-1.13	
Turnout		57,351	63.59	+4.38	
Electors on the lists		90,186			
Bloc Québécois hold		Swing		-11.18	

2004 Canadian federal election: Montcalm
Party	Candidate	Votes	%	±%	Expenditures
Bloc Québécois	Roger Gaudet	34,383	71.24	+11.78	$61,436
Liberal	Daniel Brazeau	7,915	16.40	-9.43	$78,151
Conservative	Michel Paulette	2,831	5.87	-3.82	$3,730
Green	Serge Bellemare	1,606	3.33	–	$0
New Democratic	François Rivest	1,531	3.17	+1.57	
Total valid votes/expense limit		48,266	96.79	$81,149	
Total rejected ballots		1,601	3.21		
Turnout		49,867	59.22		
Electors on the lists		84,211			
Bloc Québécois hold		Swing		+10.60	
Percentage change figures are factored for redistribution. Conservative Party percentages are contrasted with the combined Canadian Alliance and Progressive Conservative percentages from 2000.
