= Jacques Bureau =

Canadian politician

The Honourable Jacques Bureau PC KC
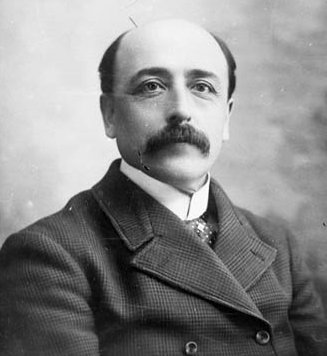

8th Senator for La Salle, Quebec
- In office September 5, 1925 – January 23, 1933
- Nominated by: William Lyon Mackenzie King
- Preceded by: Joseph Godbout
- Succeeded by: Lucien Moraud

Minister of Customs and Excise
- In office December 29, 1921 – September 4, 1925
- Prime Minister: William Lyon Mackenzie King
- Preceded by: John Babington Macaulay Baxter
- Succeeded by: Georges Henri Boivin

6th Solicitor General of Canada
- In office February 14, 1907 – October 6, 1911
- Prime Minister: Sir Wilfrid Laurier
- Preceded by: Rodolphe Lemieux
- Succeeded by: Arthur Meighen

Member of the House of Commons of Canada
- In office November 7, 1900 – September 5, 1925
- Preceded by: Sir Adolphe-Philippe Caron
- Succeeded by: Arthur Bettez
- Constituency: Three Rivers and St. Maurice

Personal details
- Born: July 9, 1860 Trois-Rivières, Canada East
- Died: January 23, 1933 (aged 72)
- Party: Liberal
- Profession: Lawyer

Jacques Bureau, PC KC (July 9, 1860 – January 23, 1933) was a Canadian politician.

Born in Trois-Rivières, Canada East, the son of J. Napoleon Bureau and Sophie Gingras, Bureau was educated at Nicolet College and received a Bachelor of Laws degree in 1881 from Laval University. A lawyer, he was elected to the House of Commons of Canada for the riding of Three Rivers and St. Maurice in the 1900 federal election. A Liberal, he was re-elected in 1904, 1908, 1911, 1917, and 1921. From 1907 to 1911, he was the Solicitor General of Canada. From 1921 to 1925, he was the Minister of Customs and Excise. In 1925, after his involvement in the King-Byng Affair, he was called to the Senate of Canada representing the senatorial division of La Salle, Quebec. He served until his death in 1933.
