= Pierre H. Vincent =

Canadian politician

The Honourable Pierre H. Vincent PC

Minister of the Environment
- In office June 25, 1993 – November 3, 1993
- Governor General: Roméo LeBlanc
- Prime Minister: Kim Campbell
- Preceded by: Jean Charest
- Succeeded by: Sheila Copps

Minister of Consumer and Corporate Affairs
- In office January 4, 1993 – June 24, 1993
- Governor General: Roméo LeBlanc
- Prime Minister: Brian Mulroney
- Preceded by: Pierre Blais
- Succeeded by: Jean Charest as Minister of Industry

Member of Parliament for Trois-Rivières
- In office September 4, 1984 – October 24, 1993
- Preceded by: Claude Lajoie
- Succeeded by: Yves Rocheleau

Personal details
- Born: April 2, 1955 (age 71) Trois-Rivières, Quebec
- Party: Progressive Conservative

Pierre H. Vincent, PC (born April 2, 1955 in Trois-Rivières, Quebec) is a Canadian tax lawyer and former politician.

== Member of Parliament ==
Vincent was first elected to the House of Commons of Canada in the 1984 electoral landslide that brought Brian Mulroney and the Progressive Conservative Party to power. Vincent, the PC Member of Parliament for Trois-Rivières served as Parliamentary Secretary to the Minister of National Revenue from 1984 until 1985; Parliamentary Secretary to the Minister of Finance from 1985 to 1993, and was also Parliamentary Secretary to the Deputy Prime Minister of Canada from 1991 to 1993.

== Cabinet member ==
In January 1993, Vincent was elevated to Prime Minister Mulroney's Cabinet as Minister of State for Indian Affairs and Northern Development and Minister of Consumer and Corporate Affairs. When Kim Campbell succeeded Mulroney as PC leader and prime minister, she promoted Vincent to Minister of the Environment.

He was sworn of the Privy Council on January 5, 1993.

Both Vincent and the Campbell government were defeated in the 1993 federal election and Vincent returned to private life.

== Return in politics ==
Both Vincent and former colleague Suzanne Duplessis managed the Conservative campaign in Quebec in the 2008 federal election.

== Footnotes ==
Parliament of Canada
Preceded by Claude Lajoie (Liberal)	Member of Parliament for Trois-Rivières; 1984–1993	Succeeded by Yves Rocheleau (BQ)
25th Canadian Ministry (1993) – Cabinet of Kim Campbell
Cabinet post (1)
Predecessor	Office	Successor
Jean Charest	Minister of the Environment; 1993	Sheila Copps
24th Canadian Ministry (1984–1993) – Cabinet of Brian Mulroney
Cabinet post (1)
Predecessor	Office	Successor
Pierre Blais	Minister of Consumer and Corporate Affairs; 1993	Jean Charest
