= Arthur Bettez =

Canadian politician (1871–1931)

Arthur Bettez (28 December 1871 – 4 January 1931) was a Canadian politician from Quebec, Canada.

He was born in Trois-Rivières, Mauricie and became an accountant by trade. From 1923 to 1931 he was Mayor of Trois-Rivières.

Bettez ran as a Liberal candidate in the district of Three Rivers and St. Maurice in the 1925 federal election and won. He was re-elected in 1926 and 1930, then in 1931 died in office.

== Electoral record ==
1925 Canadian federal election: Three Rivers—St. Maurice
Party	Candidate	Votes
Liberal	Arthur Bettez	10,285
Conservative	Louis Normand	6,007
Unknown	Robert Ryan	1,999

1926 Canadian federal election: Three Rivers—St. Maurice
Party	Candidate	Votes}}
Liberal	Arthur Bettez	11,384
Conservative	Louis Normand	5,737

1930 Canadian federal election: Three Rivers—St. Maurice
Party	Candidate	Votes}}
Liberal	Arthur Bettez	14,732
Conservative	Louis-D. Durand	11,083

Parliament of Canada
Preceded by Jacques Bureau, Liberal	MP, District of Three Rivers and St. Maurice; 1925–1931	Succeeded by Charles Bourgeois, Conservative
Political offices
Preceded by Louis-Philippe Normand	Mayor of Trois-Rivières; 1923-1931	Succeeded by J.-H. Robichon
