= Yves Rocheleau =

Canadian politician

Member of Parliament for Trois-Rivières
- In office 25 October 1993 – 28 June 2004
- Preceded by: Pierre H. Vincent
- Succeeded by: Paule Brunelle

Personal details
- Born: 31 October 1944 (age 81) Cap-de-la-Madeleine, Quebec, Canada
- Party: Bloc Québécois
- Profession: consultant

Yves Rocheleau (born 31 October 1944) was a member of the House of Commons of Canada from 1993 to 2004. He is a consultant by career, including government work.

Born in Cap-de-la-Madeleine, Quebec, Rocheleau was elected in the Trois-Rivières electoral district under the Bloc Québécois party in the 1993, 1997 and 2000 elections, serving in the 35th, 36th and 37th Canadian Parliaments respectively.

In the 1984 general election, he unsuccessfully campaigned in the Trois-Rivières riding for the Parti nationaliste du Québec.

Rocheleau left Canadian federal politics in 2004.

== Electoral record ==
1984 Canadian federal election: Trois-Rivières
Party	Candidate	Votes	%	±%
Progressive Conservative	Pierre H. Vincent	26,843	63.9	+51.0
Liberal	Françoise C. Drolet	10,217	24.3	-44.1
New Democratic	John A. Pratt	1,947	4.6	-6.5
Parti nationaliste	Yves Rocheleau	1,847	4.4	
Rhinoceros	Houblon-oubedon Lemoine	1,018	2.4	
Communist	Paul Gagné	110	0.3	
Total valid votes		41,982	100.0	

1993 Canadian federal election: Trois-Rivières
Party	Candidate	Votes	%	±%
Bloc Québécois	Yves Rocheleau	24,882	53.2	
Progressive Conservative	Pierre H. Vincent	11,053	23.6	-45.2
Liberal	Jean-Pierre Caron	9,937	21.2	+5.5
Natural Law	Roger Périgny	522	1.1	
New Democratic	Maryse Choquette	374	0.8	-12.0
Total valid votes		46,768	100.0	

1997 Canadian federal election: Trois-Rivières
Party	Candidate	Votes	%	±%
Bloc Québécois	Yves Rocheleau	21,267	42.5	-10.7
Liberal	Jean-Guy Doucet	15,692	31.3	+10.1
Progressive Conservative	Michel Charland	12,102	24.2	+0.5
New Democratic	Dorothy Hénaut	528	1.1	+0.3
Natural Law	Roger Périgny	503	1.0	-0.1
Total valid votes		50,092	100.0	

2000 Canadian federal election: Trois-Rivières
Party	Candidate	Votes	%	±%
Bloc Québécois	Yves Rocheleau	22,405	46.7	+4.2
Liberal	Denis Normandin	20,606	42.9	+11.6
Alliance	Luc Legaré	2,161	4.5	
Progressive Conservative	Scott Healy	1,599	3.3	-20.8
Natural Law	Gilles Raymond	538	1.1	+0.1
New Democratic	David Horlock	512	1.1	–
Marxist–Leninist	Alexandre Deschênes	184	0.4	
Total valid votes		48,005	100.0	
