= Guy Julien =

Canadian politician

Guy Julien was a politician from Quebec, Canada.

== Background ==
He was born on February 16, 1945, in Shawinigan, Mauricie.

== Provincial politics ==
He won the Parti Québécois nomination in the district of Trois-Rivières by only three votes, but won a seat at the legislature in 1994.

Julien was appointed to the Cabinet in 1996. He served as Ministry of Industry and Trade under Premier Lucien Bouchard and as Minister of Revenue under Premier Bernard Landry.

He was re-elected in 1998 against Liberal candidate and Mayor of Trois-Rivières Guy Leblanc, but lost hid bid for re-election against Liberal André Gabias in 2003.

== Mayoral candidate ==
He ran for Mayor of Trois-Rivières in 2005 against incumbent Yves Lévesque, but was defeated with only 28% of the vote.

== Footnotes ==
National Assembly of Quebec
| Preceded by Paul Philibert, Liberal | MNA, District of Trois-Rivières; 1994–2003 | Succeeded by André Gabias, Liberal |
