= Vaugeois =

Vaugeois is a French surname. Notable people with the surname include:

- Denis Vaugeois (born 1935), Canadian historian
- Henri Vaugeois (1864–1916), French politician
- Lise Vaugeois, Canadian politician
