= William McDonell Dawson =

Canadian politician (1822–1890)

William McDonell Dawson (1822 – August 9, 1890) was a Quebec businessman and political figure, and a Scottish Roman Catholic.

He was born in Redhaven, Banffshire, Scotland in 1822 and came to Nepean Township near Bytown around 1836. He served as Crown Lands agent at Ottawa and was superintendent of the woods and forests branch in the Crown Lands department from 1852 to 1857. Dawson was founder and present of the North-West Transit Company.

In 1858, he was elected to the Legislative Assembly of the Province of Canada for Trois-Rivières; he was defeated there but elected for the County of Ottawa in the 1861 general election. During his first term in office, he travelled to London in an attempt to secure financing for a transcontinental railroad.

He died at Montreal in 1890.

His brother Simon James served in the Ontario legislature and the Canadian House of Commons. Another brother Aeneas McDonell Dawson was a priest and author at Ottawa.

Political offices
| Preceded by Antoine Polette, Parti bleu | MLA, District of Trois-Rivières; 1858–1861 | Succeeded by Joseph-Édouard Turcotte, Parti bleu |
