= Guy LeBlanc (Quebec politician) =

Canadian politician

Guy LeBlanc was a politician from Quebec, Canada, who was Mayor of Trois-Rivières from 1990 to 2001.

== Background ==
He was born around 1947 and became a notary.

== City Councillor ==
He was elected to the Trois-Rivières City Council in 1982 and was re-elected in 1986.

== Mayor of Trois-Rivières ==
After Mayor Gilles Beaudoin announced that he would retire from politics in 1990, LeBlanc made the decision to run for Mayor of Trois-Rivières and won. He was re-elected in 1994 and 1998. He did not run for re-election in 2001.

== Provincial Politics ==
He also ran as a Liberal candidate in 1998 in the provincial district of Trois-Rivières against Parti Québécois incumbent Guy Julien. Julien was re-elected by a large margin.

== Footnotes ==
Political offices
Preceded by Gilles Beaudoin	Mayor of Trois-Rivières; 1990-2001	Succeeded by Yves Lévesque
