= Yves Gabias =

Canadian politician

Member of the Legislative Assembly of Quebec for Trois-Rivières
- In office 1960–1969
- Preceded by: Maurice Duplessis
- Succeeded by: Gilles Gauthier

Personal details
- Born: December 8, 1920 Montreal, Quebec
- Died: March 22, 2002 (aged 81) Trois-Rivières, Quebec
- Party: Union Nationale

Yves Gabias (December 8, 1920 – March 25, 2002) was a politician from Quebec, Canada.

== Background ==
He was born on December 8, 1920, in Montreal and was a lawyer. He was the father of Liberal MNA André Gabias.

== Member of the legislature ==
He ran as a Union Nationale candidate in the district of Trois-Rivières in 1960 and won. He was succeeding Maurice Duplessis who had died a year before. He was re-elected in 1962 and 1966.

== Member of the Cabinet ==
He was appointed to the Cabinet and served as Minister of Immigration under Premier Jean-Jacques Bertrand.

== Retirement from Politics ==
Gabias resigned in 1969 to become judge in Trois-Rivières. He died on March 22, 2002.
