= Jean-Denis Girard =

Canadian politician

Trois-Rivières City Councillor for Châteaudun
- Incumbent
- Assumed office November 13, 2025
- Preceded by: Luc Tremblay

Member of the National Assembly of Quebec for Trois-Rivières
- In office April 7, 2014 – August 29, 2018
- Preceded by: Danielle St-Amand
- Succeeded by: Jean Boulet

Personal details
- Born: January 15, 1967 (age 59) Trois-Rivières, Quebec, Canada
- Party: Quebec Liberal Party

Jean-Denis Girard (born January 15, 1967) is a Canadian politician in Quebec, who was elected to the National Assembly of Quebec in the 2014 election. He represented the electoral district of Trois-Rivières as a member of the Quebec Liberal Party from 2014 to 2018.

Prior to his election to the legislature, he was the President of the Chamber of Commerce for Coeur-de-Québec.

In 2025, he was elected to the Trois-Rivières City Council, representing the district of Châteaudun.

== Electoral record ==
2025 Trois-Rivières municipal election: Châteaudun District
Party	Candidate	Popular vote			Expenditures
Party	Candidate	Votes	%	±%	Expenditures
Independent	Jean-Denis Girard	1,736	46.04		
Trois-Rivières Ville Forte	Annie Duchesne	1,030	27.31		
Independent	Luc Tremblay (X)	570	15.12		
Action Trois-Rivières	Jean Blanchette	230	6.10		
Independent	Simon Bégin	205	5.44		
Total valid votes					
Total rejected, unmarked and declined votes					
Turnout					
Eligible voters		7,724			
Note: Candidate campaign colours, unless a member of a party, are based on the prominent colour used in campaign items (signs, literature, etc.) or colours used in polling graphs and are used as a visual differentiation between candidates.

2018 Quebec general election: Trois-Rivières
Party	Candidate	Votes	%	±%
Coalition Avenir Québec	Jean Boulet	15,323	41.07	+18.79
Liberal	Jean-Denis Girard	8,522	22.84	-16.32
Québec solidaire	Valérie Delage	6,411	17.18	+8.68
Parti Québécois	Marie-Claude Camirand	5,758	15.43	-12.96
Green	Adis Simidzija	653	1.75	
Conservative	Daniel Hénault	639	1.71	+0.84
Total valid votes		37,306	98.04	
Total rejected ballots		744	1.96	
Turnout		38,050	70.22	
Eligible voters		54,187		
Coalition Avenir Québec gain from Liberal		Swing		+17.56
Source(s) "Rapport des résultats officiels du scrutin". Élections Québec.

2014 Quebec general election
Party	Candidate	Votes	%
Liberal	Jean-Denis Girard	11,658	39.16
Parti Québécois	Alexis Deschênes	8,452	28.39
Coalition Avenir Québec	Diego Brunelle	6,634	22.28
Québec solidaire	Jean-Claude Landry	2,531	8.50
Conservative	Pierre-Louis Bonneau	260	0.87
Option nationale	André de Repentigny	238	0.80
Total valid votes		29,773	98.05
Total rejected ballots		593	1.95
Turnout		30,366	69.00
Electors on the lists		43,721	–

Quebec provincial government of Philippe Couillard
Cabinet posts (2)
Predecessor	Office	Successor
Ministry Established	Minister for Small and Medium Enterprises, Regulatory Streamlining and Regional Economic Development; April 23, 2014–January 28, 2016	Lise Thériault
Yves-François Blanchet	Minister responsible for the Mauricie region April 23, 2014–January 28, 2016	Julie Boulet
