= Antoine Polette =

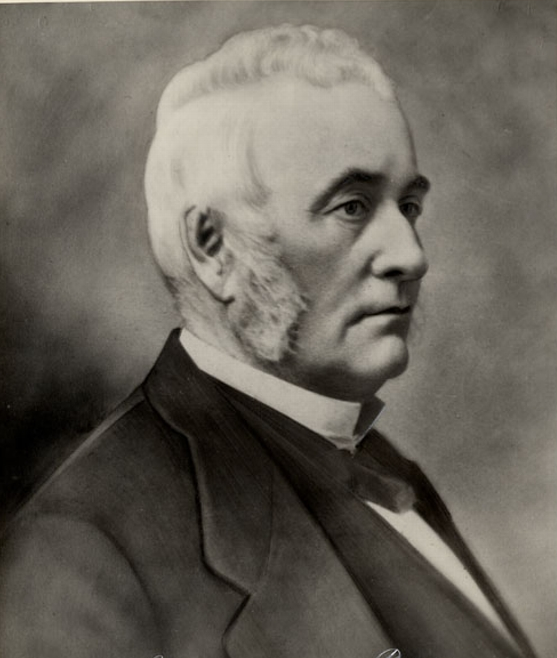
Antoine Polette

Antoine Polette (August 24, 1807 – January 6, 1887) was a Quebec lawyer, judge and political figure.

He was born Antoine Paulet in Pointe-aux-Trembles, Lower Canada in 1807 and studied at the Petit Séminaire de Québec. He articled in law at Quebec City, was admitted to the bar in 1828 and set up practice in Trois-Rivières. Polette served as warden for the county from 1842 to 1846 and then was mayor of Trois-Rivières from 1846 to 1853. He was elected to the Legislative Assembly of the Province of Canada for Trois-Rivières as a Reformer in an 1848 by-election held after the preceding general election was not completed in that riding. He was reelected in 1851 and 1854 and retired from politics in 1857. Although Polette had originally supported the government of Francis Hincks and Augustin-Norbert Morin, he participated in the defeat of this government in 1854 because of the unresolved issue of seigneurial tenure. In 1854, he was named Queen's Counsel. Polette served as a judge in the Quebec Superior Court for Trois-Rivières district from 1860 to 1880 and was a member of the royal commission that investigated the Pacific Scandal in 1873.

He died in Trois-Rivières in 1887.

Political offices
Preceded by Pierre-Benjamin Dumoulin	Mayor of Trois-Rivières; 1846-1853	Succeeded by John McDougall
Preceded by Joseph-Édouard Turcotte, Moderate Reformer	MLA, District of Trois-Rivières; 1848–1858	Succeeded by William McDonell Dawson, Tory
