= Henri-Gédéon Malhiot =

Canadian politician

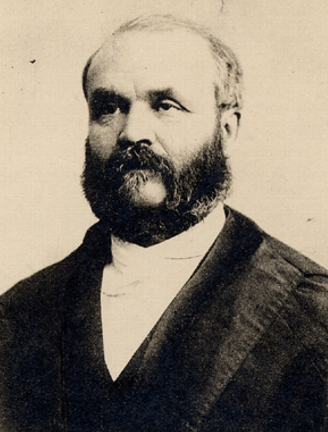

Member of the Legislative Assembly of Quebec for Trois-Rivières
- In office 1871–1876
- Preceded by: Charles-Borromée Genest
- Succeeded by: Arthur Turcotte

Personal details
- Born: March 22, 1840 Saint-Pierre-les-Becquets, Lower Canada
- Died: October 20, 1909 (aged 69) Saint-Pierre-les-Becquets, Quebec
- Party: Conservative

Henri-Gédéon Malhiot (March 22, 1840 – October 20, 1909) was a politician from Quebec, Canada.

== Background ==
He was born on March 22, 1840, in Saint-Pierre-les-Becquets, Centre-du-Quebec. He was a lawyer. He was married to Élizabeth-Eugénie Labarre in 1865 and to Louise Olivier in 1884.

== Provincial Politics ==
He ran as a Liberal candidate in the district of Nicolet in 1867 and as a Conservative candidate in the district of Trois-Rivières in an 1869 by-election. Each time he lost.

He was elected in 1871. He resigned from his seat to accept a position as Minister for Crown Lands in Premier Boucher de Boucherville's Cabinet. He was re-elected in an 1874 by-election and in a 1875 general election.

He also served as the Government House Leader from 1874 to 1876. He resigned in 1876.

== Federal Politics ==
He ran as a Conservative candidate in the district of Trois-Rivières in 1878, but lost.

== Mayor of Trois-Rivières ==
Malhiot served as Mayor of Trois-Rivières from 1885 to 1888.

== Death ==
He died on October 20, 1909.

Political offices
Preceded by Sévère Dumoulin	Mayor of Trois-Rivières; 1885-1888	Succeeded by J.-E. Hétu
