= 2025 Trois-Rivières municipal election =

Municipal election in Quebec, Canada

- Mayoral election
- November 2, 2025
Nominee	Jean-François Aubin	Pascale Albernhe-Lahaie
Party	Independent	Trois-Rivières ville forte
Popular vote	18,348	11,753
Percentage	39.22%	25.13%
Nominee	Jonathan Bradley	Dany Carpentier
Party	Independent	Independent
Popular vote	11,019	4,652
Percentage	23.56%	9.95%
Mayor before election
Jean Lamarche
Independent
Elected mayor
Jean-François Aubin
Independent
- City Council election
- November 2, 2025
- 14 seats on Trois-Rivières City Council (Note: The Mayor is a member of City Council, but for the purposes of documentation is treated as their own individual.); 8 seats needed for a majority
Party	Leader	Vote %	Seats	+/–
Independent	–		13	0
TRVF	Pascale Albernhe-Lahaie		1	0
This lists parties that won seats. See the complete results below.

The 2025 Trois-Rivières municipal election took place on November 2, 2025, to elect a mayor and city councillors in Trois-Rivières, Quebec, Canada. The election was held in conjunction with municipal elections held across Quebec on that date.

== Background ==
Jean Lamarche was elected mayor for the first time in a by-election on May 5, 2019 to succeed Yves Lévesque, who resigned on December 27, 2018, citing health reasons. He won the by-election with 54.9% of the vote, defeating Jean-François Aubin (33.5%), Éric Lord (10.7%) and Pierre-Benoît Fortin (0.9%) to become only the second-ever mayor of the city in its current amalgamated form. He was re-elected in 2021 with an increased majority of 61.49% against Valérie Renaud-Martin (37.00%) and Gilles Brodeur (1.52%). On December 18, 2024, Lamarche announced that he would not seek re-election as Mayor, citing politics as a "poison that destroys lives."

As of April 2025, only two municipal political parties in the city are registered with Élections Québec: Action Trois-Rivières, led by Jean-Claude Ayotte, and Trois-Rivières Ville Forte, led by city councillor Pascale Albernhe-Lahaie. However, Action Trois-Rivières has not yet received any applications for the position of mayor, which the party hopes to fill by April 2025. The party's candidate would be elected among party members to concurrently serve as party leader, meaning there would be a leadership race should several candidates put their names forward.

Trois-Rivières was initially slated to be one of 21 Quebec municipalities selected to participate in the Internet voting pilot project for the 2025 municipal election cycle. Élections Québec ultimately postponed the project, as the selection process for a viable firm to implement the pilot project was unsuccessful; the selection criteria had a high standard to guarantee the voting process's integrity.

== Mayoral election ==
Party	Candidate	Vote	%
Independent	Jean-François Aubin	18,348	39.22
Trois-Rivières Ville Forte	Pascale Albernhe-Lahaie	11,753	25.13
Independent	Jonathan Bradley	11,019	23.56
Independent	Dany Carpentier	4,652	9.95
Action Trois-Rivières	Jean-Claude Ayotte	738	1.58
Independent	Pierre-Benoit Fortin	267	0.57

== City council elections ==
=== Carmel District ===
Incumbent Independent city councillor Pierre Montreuil was re-elected in 2021 with 57.94% of the vote. He is not running for re-election.

2025 Trois-Rivières municipal election: Carmel District
Party	Candidate	Popular vote			Expenditures
Party	Candidate	Votes	%	±%	Expenditures
Independent	Annie Provencher	1,288	43.27		
Independent	Luc Galvani	1,073	36.04		
Trois-Rivières Ville Forte	Marie-Claude Piché	616	20.69		
Total valid votes					
Total rejected, unmarked and declined votes					
Turnout					
Eligible voters		7,601			
Note: Candidate campaign colours, unless a member of a party, are based on the prominent colour used in campaign items (signs, literature, etc.) or colours used in polling graphs and are used as a visual differentiation between candidates.

=== Carrefours District ===
Incumbent Independent city councillor René Martin was elected in 2021 with 59.47% of the vote.

2025 Trois-Rivières municipal election: Carrefours District
Party	Candidate	Popular vote			Expenditures
Party	Candidate	Votes	%	±%	Expenditures
Independent	René Martin (X)	1,934	49.68		
Independent	Gilles Matteau	801	20.58		
Trois-Rivières Ville Forte	Kézia Labonté	698	17.93		
Independent	Christian Ethier	460	11.82		
Total valid votes					
Total rejected, unmarked and declined votes					
Turnout					
Eligible voters		8,013			
Note: Candidate campaign colours, unless a member of a party, are based on the prominent colour used in campaign items (signs, literature, etc.) or colours used in polling graphs and are used as a visual differentiation between candidates.

=== Châteaudun District ===
Incumbent Independent city councillor Luc Tremblay was re-elected in 2021 with 47.05% of the vote.

2025 Trois-Rivières municipal election: Châteaudun District
Party	Candidate	Popular vote			Expenditures
Party	Candidate	Votes	%	±%	Expenditures
Independent	Jean-Denis Girard	1,736	46.04		
Trois-Rivières Ville Forte	Annie Duchesne	1,030	27.31		
Independent	Luc Tremblay (X)	570	15.12		
Action Trois-Rivières	Jean Blanchette	230	6.10		
Independent	Simon Bégin	205	5.44		
Total valid votes					
Total rejected, unmarked and declined votes					
Turnout					
Eligible voters		7,724			
Note: Candidate campaign colours, unless a member of a party, are based on the prominent colour used in campaign items (signs, literature, etc.) or colours used in polling graphs and are used as a visual differentiation between candidates.

=== Chavigny District ===
Incumbent Independent city councillor Maryse Bellemare was re-elected in 2021 with 63.72% of the vote.

2025 Trois-Rivières municipal election: Chavigny District
Party	Candidate	Popular vote			Expenditures
Party	Candidate	Votes	%	±%	Expenditures
Independent	Maryse Bellemare (X)	1,731	54.76		
Independent	Maverick Fleurent	761	24.07		
Trois-Rivières Ville Forte	Jeffrey Leguë	669	21.16		
Total valid votes					
Total rejected, unmarked and declined votes					
Turnout					
Eligible voters		8,034			
Note: Candidate campaign colours, unless a member of a party, are based on the prominent colour used in campaign items (signs, literature, etc.) or colours used in polling graphs and are used as a visual differentiation between candidates.

=== Estacades District ===
Incumbent Independent city councillor Pierre-Luc Fortin was re-elected in 2021 by acclamation.

2025 Trois-Rivières municipal election: Estacades District
Party	Candidate	Popular vote			Expenditures
Party	Candidate	Votes	%	±%	Expenditures
Independent	Pierre-Luc Fortin (X)	1,976	65.34		
Trois-Rivières Ville Forte	René Guillemette	615	20.34		
Action Trois-Rivières	Stéphane Boisvert	433	14.32		
Total valid votes					
Total rejected, unmarked and declined votes					
Turnout					
Eligible voters		7,700			
Note: Candidate campaign colours, unless a member of a party, are based on the prominent colour used in campaign items (signs, literature, etc.) or colours used in polling graphs and are used as a visual differentiation between candidates.

=== Forges District ===
Incumbent Independent city councillor Alain Lafontaine was elected in 2021 with 35.28% of the vote.

2025 Trois-Rivières municipal election: Forges District
Party	Candidate	Popular vote			Expenditures
Party	Candidate	Votes	%	±%	Expenditures
Independent	Pierre Piché	1,496	38.05		
Trois-Rivières Ville Forte	Yannick Daviault	1,452	36.93		
Independent	Alain Lafontaine (X)	984	25.03		
Total valid votes					
Total rejected, unmarked and declined votes					
Turnout					
Eligible voters		8,537			
Note: Candidate campaign colours, unless a member of a party, are based on the prominent colour used in campaign items (signs, literature, etc.) or colours used in polling graphs and are used as a visual differentiation between candidates.

=== La-Vérendrye District ===
Incumbent Independent city councillor Dany Carpentier was re-elected in 2021 with 68.38% of the vote. He is running for mayor.

2025 Trois-Rivières municipal election: La-Vérendrye District
Party	Candidate	Popular vote			Expenditures
Party	Candidate	Votes	%	±%	Expenditures
Independent	Gabrielle Groulx	799	38.67		
Independent	Jean-Philippe Lemay	605	29.28		
Trois-Rivières Ville Forte	Jean-Marc Bouchard	466	22.56		
Action Trois-Rivières	Xavier Douville	196	9.49		
Total valid votes					
Total rejected, unmarked and declined votes					
Turnout					
Eligible voters		7,018			
Note: Candidate campaign colours, unless a member of a party, are based on the prominent colour used in campaign items (signs, literature, etc.) or colours used in polling graphs and are used as a visual differentiation between candidates.

=== Madeleine District ===
Incumbent Independent city councillor Sabrina Roy was re-elected in 2021 with 80.70% of the vote.

2025 Trois-Rivières municipal election: Madeleine District
Party	Candidate	Popular vote			Expenditures
Party	Candidate	Votes	%	±%	Expenditures
Independent	Sabrina Roy (X)	1,197	42.34		
Independent	Pierre Catellier	737	26.07		
Trois-Rivières Ville Forte	Ariann Bellerose	600	21.22		
Action Trois-Rivières	Éric Lemaire	293	10.36		
Total valid votes					
Total rejected, unmarked and declined votes					
Turnout					
Eligible voters		8,289			
Note: Candidate campaign colours, unless a member of a party, are based on the prominent colour used in campaign items (signs, literature, etc.) or colours used in polling graphs and are used as a visual differentiation between candidates.

=== Marie-de-l'Incarnation District ===
Incumbent Independent city councillor Richard W. Dober was elected in 2021 with 51.60% of the vote.

2025 Trois-Rivières municipal election: Marie-de-l'Incarnation District
Party	Candidate	Popular vote			Expenditures
Party	Candidate	Votes	%	±%	Expenditures
Trois-Rivières Ville Forte	Édith Lachance	1,328	47.77		
Independent	Richard W. Dober (X)	888	31.94		
Independent	Lisette Venne	501	18.02		
Independent	Sir-Daniel Simon	63	2.27		
Total valid votes					
Total rejected, unmarked and declined votes					
Turnout					
Eligible voters		7,495			
Note: Candidate campaign colours, unless a member of a party, are based on the prominent colour used in campaign items (signs, literature, etc.) or colours used in polling graphs and are used as a visual differentiation between candidates.

=== Pointe-du-Lac District ===
Incumbent Independent city councillor François Bélisle was re-elected in 2021 with 75.71% of the vote.

2025 Trois-Rivières municipal election: Pointe-du-Lac District
Party	Candidate	Popular vote			Expenditures
Party	Candidate	Votes	%	±%	Expenditures
Independent	François Bélisle (X)	2,561	72.30		
Action Trois-Rivières	Isabelle D. Lecours	541	15.27		
Trois-Rivières Ville Forte	Pascal Marchesseault	440	12.42		
Total valid votes					
Total rejected, unmarked and declined votes					
Turnout					
Eligible voters		8,511			
Note: Candidate campaign colours, unless a member of a party, are based on the prominent colour used in campaign items (signs, literature, etc.) or colours used in polling graphs and are used as a visual differentiation between candidates.

=== Richelieu District ===
Incumbent Independent city councillor Jonathan Bradley was elected in 2021 with 48.93% of the vote. He is running for mayor.

2025 Trois-Rivières municipal election: Richelieu District
Party	Candidate	Popular vote			Expenditures
Party	Candidate	Votes	%	±%	Expenditures
Independent	Vincent Héroux	938	22.30		
Independent	Nathalie Cauchon	937	22.28		
Independent	Nicolas Mêlé	890	21.16		
Independent	François Morasse	761	18.09		
Trois-Rivières Ville Forte	Marc-Antoine Berthiaume	449	10.68		
Independent	Luc Bouthillier	231	5.49		
Total valid votes					
Total rejected, unmarked and declined votes					
Turnout					
Eligible voters		8,019			
Note: Candidate campaign colours, unless a member of a party, are based on the prominent colour used in campaign items (signs, literature, etc.) or colours used in polling graphs and are used as a visual differentiation between candidates.

=== Rivières District ===
Incumbent Trois-Rivières Ville Forte city councillor Pascale Albernhe-Lahaie was elected in 2021 with 41.20% of the vote. She has announced that she will be running for Mayor in the upcoming election, and thus will not seek re-election.

2025 Trois-Rivières municipal election: Rivières District
Party	Candidate	Popular vote			Expenditures
Party	Candidate	Votes	%	±%	Expenditures
Independent	Nancy Sabourin	2,365	65.75		
Independent	Christiane Bernier	803	22.32		
Trois-Rivières Ville Forte	Adeline Mbo Atabelafi	429	11.93		
Total valid votes					
Total rejected, unmarked and declined votes					
Turnout					
Eligible voters		7,525			
Note: Candidate campaign colours, unless a member of a party, are based on the prominent colour used in campaign items (signs, literature, etc.) or colours used in polling graphs and are used as a visual differentiation between candidates.

=== Sainte-Marthe District ===
Incumbent Independent city councillor Daniel Cournoyer was re-elected in 2021 with 69.28% of the vote. He is not running for re-election.

2025 Trois-Rivières municipal election: Sainte-Marthe District
Party	Candidate	Popular vote			Expenditures
Party	Candidate	Votes	%	±%	Expenditures
Independent	Jean-François Lasnier	902	29.27		
Trois-Rivières Ville Forte	Marie-Stéphanie Duclos	775	25.15		
Independent	Denis Foucault	731	23.72		
Independent	Robert Pilotte	333	10.80		
Independent	Jesús Machado	280	9.09		
Action Trois-Rivières	Alain St-Onge	61	1.98		
Total valid votes					
Total rejected, unmarked and declined votes					
Turnout					
Eligible voters		7,695			
Note: Candidate campaign colours, unless a member of a party, are based on the prominent colour used in campaign items (signs, literature, etc.) or colours used in polling graphs and are used as a visual differentiation between candidates.

=== Saint-Louis-de-France District ===
Incumbent Independent city councillor Geneviève Auclair was elected in 2021 with 62.90% of the vote. She is not running for re-election.

2025 Trois-Rivières municipal election: Saint-Louis-de-France District
Party	Candidate	Popular vote			Expenditures
Party	Candidate	Votes	%	±%	Expenditures
Independent	Guy Daigle	1,653	46.22		
Independent	Steve Gosselin	1,022	28.58		
Independent	Julie Caron	901	25.20		
Total valid votes					
Total rejected, unmarked and declined votes					
Turnout					
Eligible voters		8,255			
Note: Candidate campaign colours, unless a member of a party, are based on the prominent colour used in campaign items (signs, literature, etc.) or colours used in polling graphs and are used as a visual differentiation between candidates.
