= Joseph-Adolphe Tessier =

Canadian politician

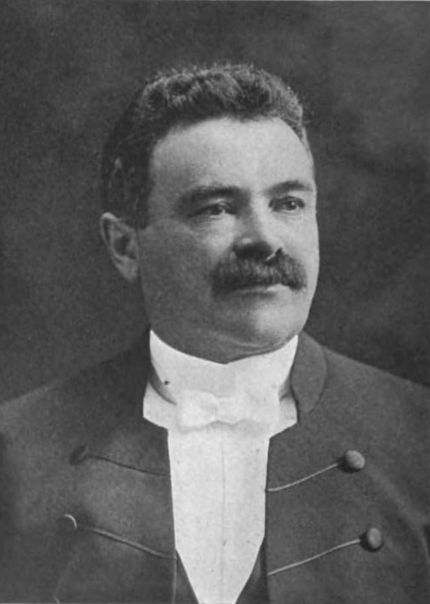

Minister of Transportation of Quebec
- In office 1914–1921

Mayor of Trois-Rivières
- In office 1913–1921

Member of the National Assembly of Quebec
- In office 1904–1914

Personal details
- Born: December 17, 1861; Sainte-Anne-de-la-Pérade, Canada East
- Died: November 8, 1928 (aged 66); Trois-Rivières, Quebec
- Political party: Liberal
- Spouse: Marie-Louise-Elmire Guillet
- Occupation: Politician

Joseph-Adolphe Tessier (French pronunciation: [ʒozɛf adɔlf tesje]; December 17, 1861 – November 8, 1928) was a politician from Quebec, Canada.

== Background ==
He was born on December 17, 1861, in Sainte-Anne-de-la-Pérade, Mauricie. He was a lawyer and a senior army officer of the local military reserve. He was married to Marie-Louise-Elmire Guillet.

== Mayor of Trois-Rivières ==
He was Mayor of Trois-Rivières from 1913 to 1921.

== Member of the legislature ==
He ran as a Liberal candidate in the district of Trois-Rivières in 1904 and won. He was re-elected in 1908 and 1912. He was Deputy Speaker of the House from 1912 to 1914.

== Member of the Cabinet ==
Tessier resigned from his seat to accept a position in Premier Lomer Gouin's Cabinet and was re-elected in a by-election. He served as Minister of Transportation from 1914 until 1921.

He was re-elected in 1916 and 1919.

== Retirement from politics ==
Tessier resigned in 1921 to accept a government appointment. He died in Trois-Rivières on November 8, 1928.

== Footnotes ==
National Assembly of Quebec
Preceded by Richard-Stanislas Cooke, Liberal	MLA, District of Trois-Rivières; 1904–1921	Succeeded by Louis-Philippe Mercier, Liberal
Political offices
Preceded by Louis-Philippe Normand	Mayor of Trois-Rivières; 1913-1921	Succeeded by Louis-Philippe Normand
