= Paul Philibert =

Canadian politician (born 1944)

Paul Philibert was a politician in Quebec, Canada. He served as a Member of the National Assembly (MNA) from 1985 to 1994.

== Background ==
He was born on September 10, 1944, in Saint-Élie, Mauricie.

== Political career ==
He ran as a Liberal candidate in the district of Trois-Rivières in 1981, but lost against PQ incumbent Denis Vaugeois.

After Vaugeois resigned in 1985, Philibert won a by-election in the same district. He was re-elected six months later against newly appointed Cabinet Member Rollande Cloutier and was re-elected in 1989. He served as a Parliamentary Assistant from 1985 until the 1994 election in which he was defeated by PQ candidate Guy Julien.

== Footnotes ==
National Assembly of Quebec
Preceded by Denis Vaugeois (PQ)	MNA, District of Trois-Rivières; 1985–1994	Succeeded by Guy Julien (PQ)
