= Guy LeBlanc =

Guy LeBlanc may refer to:

- Guy LeBlanc (Nova Scotia politician)
- Guy LeBlanc (Quebec politician)
- Guy LeBlanc (keyboardist)
