= John McDougall (Quebec politician) =

John McDougall (July 25, 1805 – February 25, 1870) was a businessman and political figure in Canada East.

He was born in Coldstream, Scotland in 1805 and settled at Trois-Rivières around 1833. He owned a general store there and served as mayor from 1855 to 1857. He was president of the Three Rivers Gas Company. He was elected to the Legislative Assembly of the Province of Canada for Drummond in 1851; he ran unsuccessfully in Trois-Rivières in 1858. McDougall served as a director for the North Shore Railway. In 1862 and 1863, he purchased ironworks at Saint-Maurice and L'Islet.

He died in Vieilles-Forges near Trois-Rivières in 1870.

His sons became partners in his various businesses. His son William was a member of the Canadian House of Commons.

The former ironworks at Saint-Maurice, Les Forges du Saint-Maurice, has been designated a National Historic Site of Canada.

Political offices
Preceded by Antoine Polette	Mayor of Trois-Rivières; 1854-1855	Succeeded by J.-B. Lajoie
