= Liberal-Conservative Party =

- Founders: John A. Macdonald; George-Étienne Cartier
- Founded: 1867
- Dissolved: 1938 (party renamed)
- Preceded by: Parti bleu
- Merged into: Conservative Party of Canada (historical)
- Ideology: Conservatism
- Political position: Centre-right to right-wing

The Liberal-Conservative Party (French: le Parti libéral-conservateur) was the formal name of the Conservative Party of Canada until 1917, and again from 1922 to 1938. Prior to 1970, candidates could run under any label they chose, and in many of Canada's early elections, there were both "Liberal-Conservative" and "Conservative" candidates; however, these were simply different labels used by candidates of the same party. Both were part of Sir John A. Macdonald's government and official Conservative and Liberal-Conservative candidates would not, generally, run against each other. It was also common for a candidate to run on one label in one election and the other in a subsequent election.

== History ==
The roots of the name are in the coalition of September 11, 1854 in which moderate Reformers and Conservatives from Canada West joined with bleus from Canada East under the dual premiership of Sir Allan MacNab and A.-N. Morin. The new ministry committed to secularizing Clergy reserves in Canada West and abolishing seigneurial tenure in Canada East. Over time, the Liberal-Conservatives were commonly referred to as the Conservative party and their opponents, the Clear Grits and the Parti rouge evolved into the Liberal Party of Canada. However, the Liberal-Conservative Party remained the official name to 1917, and again from 1922 to 1938.

Prominent Liberal-Conservative Members of Parliament and Senators in Canadian history include:

- Sir John A. Macdonald
- Sir George-Étienne Cartier
- Sir Alexander Tilloch Galt
- Sir John Carling
- Sir John Rose
- Thomas D'Arcy McGee
- Joseph Howe
- Sir Samuel Leonard Tilley
- Sir John Joseph Caldwell Abbott
- John Henry Pope
- Joseph-Aldric Ouimet (Liberal-Conservative MP 1873–1896, ran as Conservative and defeated in 1908)
- Sir John Sparrow David Thompson
- Sir Sam Hughes
- Sir Hugh John Macdonald
- Archibald McLelan (Liberal-Conservative Senator, resigned and elected to the House of Commons as a Conservative after 1881)
- Joseph Godéric Blanchet (Liberal-Conservative from 1867 to 1875, Conservative 1875–1878, Liberal-Conservative 1878–1883)
- John Costigan (Liberal-Conservative 1867–1900, crossed the floor to join the Liberals in 1901)

The party resumed formally referring to itself as Liberal-Conservative from 1922 until 1938 when it officially became the National Conservative Party; however, it was commonly referred to as the Conservative Party throughout this period.

== Liberal Conservative Coalition ==
In the 1957 election, George Rolland, a watchmaker, sought election as a Liberal Conservative Coalition candidate in the Toronto riding of Eglinton. He placed last, winning only 252 votes, or 0.7% of the total. Both the Liberal and Conservative parties nominated candidates in the riding, so Rolland did not have the endorsement of either party.

Source: Parliament of Canada History of the Federal Electoral Ridings since 1867

== See also ==
- Conservative Party of Canada (1867–1942)
- List of political parties in Canada
- Democratic-Republican Party
