= Sévère Dumoulin =

Canadian politician

Member of the Legislative Assembly of Quebec for Trois-Rivières
- In office 1868–1869
- Preceded by: Louis-Charles Boucher de Niverville
- Succeeded by: Charles-Borromée Genest
- In office 1881–1884
- Preceded by: Arthur Turcotte
- Succeeded by: Arthur Turcotte

Personal details
- Born: February 4, 1829 Trois-Rivières, Lower Canada
- Died: May 17, 1910 (aged 81) Trois-Rivières, Quebec
- Party: Conservative

Sévère Dumoulin (February 4, 1829 – May 17, 1910) was a politician from Quebec, Canada.

== Background ==
He was born on February 4, 1829, in Trois-Rivières, Mauricie. He was a lawyer. He was married to Frances Sophia Macaulay in 1862 and to Elizabeth Broster in 1877.

== Mayor of Trois-Rivières ==
Dumoulin served as a Council member from 1857 to 1861 and from 1864 to 1865 and as Mayor of Trois-Rivières from 1865 to 1869 and from 1879 to 1885.

== Provincial Politics ==
He ran as a Conservative candidate in the district of Trois-Rivières in 1867 and lost, but won a by-election in the same district in 1868. He resigned in 1869 to accept an appointment as a sheriff.

Dumoulin ran again in 1881 as a Conservative candidate in the same district and won. However the election was cancelled and he lost the subsequent by-election.

== Death ==
He died on May 17, 1910.

== Footnotes ==
Political offices
Preceded by Louis-Charles Boucher de Niverville	Mayor of Trois-Rivières; 1865-1869	Succeeded by Joseph-Moïse Désilet
Preceded by Joseph-Napoléon Bureau	Mayor of Trois-Rivières; 1879-1885	Succeeded by Henri-Gédéon Malhiot
