= Louis-Philippe Normand =

Canadian politician

The Hon. Louis-Philippe Normand
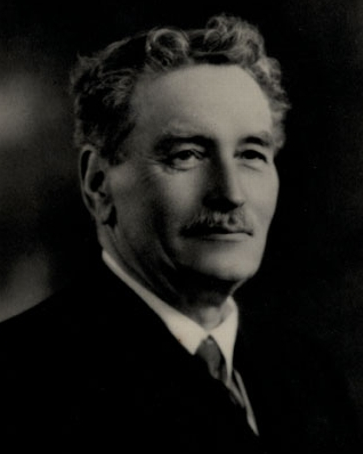

Mayor of Trois-Rivières
- In office 1908–1913
- Preceded by: François-Siméon Tourigny
- Succeeded by: Joseph-Adolphe Tessier
- In office 1921–1923
- Preceded by: Joseph-Adolphe Tessier
- Succeeded by: Arthur Bettez

Personal details
- Born: September 21, 1863 Trois-Rivières, Quebec, Canada
- Died: June 27, 1928 (aged 64) Trois-Rivières, Quebec
- Party: Conservative
- Cabinet: President of the Privy Council (1921)

Louis-Philippe Normand, PC (French pronunciation: [lwi filip nɔʁmɑ̃]; September 21, 1863 – June 27, 1928) was a Canadian physician and politician.

Born in Trois-Rivières, Canada East, the son of Télesphore-Eusèbe Normand and Alphonsine Giroux, he received his Doctor of Medicine from Université Laval in 1886. A practicing physician, he was also mayor of Trois-Rivières. In 1911, he ran for the House of Commons of Canada in the Quebec riding of Three Rivers and St. Maurice as the Conservative candidate and was defeated. In September 1921, he was appointed President of the Privy Council in the cabinet of Arthur Meighen. He was defeated in the 1921 federal election which was held in December.

In 1922, Normand was appointed as President of the Medical Council of Canada.

He married Graziella Beaulieu and had nine children.

In 1916, a geographic township in the Mékinac Regional County Municipality was named after him, which in turn gave its name to a lake and the Lac-Normand unorganized territory.
