= Jean Lamarche =

Canadian politician

Mayor of Trois-Rivières
- In office May 17, 2019 – November 13, 2025
- Preceded by: Yves Lévesque
- Succeeded by: Jean-François Aubin

Personal details
- Born: 1971 (age 54–55) Trois-Rivières
- Spouse: Kathleen Bélanger
- Children: 2

Jean Lamarche (born 1971) is a Canadian politician. He served as the mayor of Trois-Rivières, Quebec from 2019 to 2025.

== Early life ==
Prior to being entering politics, Lamarche worked in the communications office for the Ministry of Transportation and was the president of FestiVoix, a local music festival. He received a social communications degree from the Université du Québec à Trois-Rivières and worked for Radio-Canada Mauricie as a researcher and assistant director from 2006 to 2008. He was also the co-founder and former publisher of the La Galère, a community newspaper.

== Mayoralty ==
=== First term ===
Lamarche was elected as mayor of Trois-Rivières in a by-election on May 5, 2019, winning 55% of the vote. He had been endorsed by the previous mayor, Yves Lévesque who had resigned for health reasons.

In his first term as mayor, Lamarche has had to deal with the COVID-19 pandemic in Quebec, the completion of Colisée Vidéotron, reorganization of Société de transport de Trois-Rivières bus routes, a lack of indoor pools and criticism from city councillors for keeping them out of the decision making process. On council, he has lost some major votes including a grant for the Trois-Rivières Aigles baseball team, and a grant for the Grand Prix of Trois-Rivières. Despite his opposition on council, he was seen as being more willing to listen than Lévesque.

In August 2021, a council resolution he was sponsoring, aimed at authorizing a loan to begin wetland drainage work to advance the expansion project of the Carrefour 40-55 industrial park, was blocked by city council. This work would have led to the destruction of fifteen hectares of wetland and affected another twelve hectares. In July 2022, Radio-Canada revealed that while city councillors were voting against the expansion project, backfilling work was underway on a wetland belonging to an electric vehicle charging station manufacturing plant. Lamarche was accused of failing to keep city councillors informed, some of whom expressed surprise or outrage. He defended himself by saying that the expansion plan on which councillors had voted for a year prior, did not include the factory's land and that the land sold to the factory, with council approval, included the destroyed wetland. This plan allowed the city to retain its permit for filling in 26.6 hectares of wetlands, obtained in 2014, before the law was updated in 2018.

=== Second term ===
Lamarche was re-elected in the 2021 mayoral election, defeating city councillor Valérie Renaud-Martin 61.5% to 37%, and a margin of nearly 10,000 votes. He cited the renovations of the J.-Antonio-Thompson Hall, the airport terminal, and the Port of Trois-Rivières as among his top accomplishments from his first term, and took pride in the city's acquisition of the Trois-Rivières Lions ice hockey team. In the election, he ran on a platform of diversifying the city's economy, a better balance between sustainable development and the economy, and quality of life.

In January 2023, Lamarche stepped back from his duties after controversy surrounding his support for the plan to destroy wetlands for the expansion of the Carrefour 40-55 industrial park. According to Lamarche, council opposition was causing an "unhealthy work climate", leading him to make the decision. He would ultimately take a six-month leave of absence, returning in July of that year. During his leave of absence, he was replaced as Deputy Mayor Daniel Cournoyer. When he returned, he was able to secure funding for the industrial park, casting the deciding vote at council, breaking a 7–7 tie, amidst protests from residents attending the vote, who had interrupted the processions on several occasions.

In December 2024, Lamarche announced he was not going to run in the 2025 mayoral election. A few months later, it was rumoured that he was considering running for the Quebec Liberal Party in the 2026 Quebec general election.

Lamarche endorsed Jonathan Bradley in the 2025 mayoral race.
