= Denis Vaugeois =

Canadian politician (born 1935)

Denis Vaugeois CM OQ
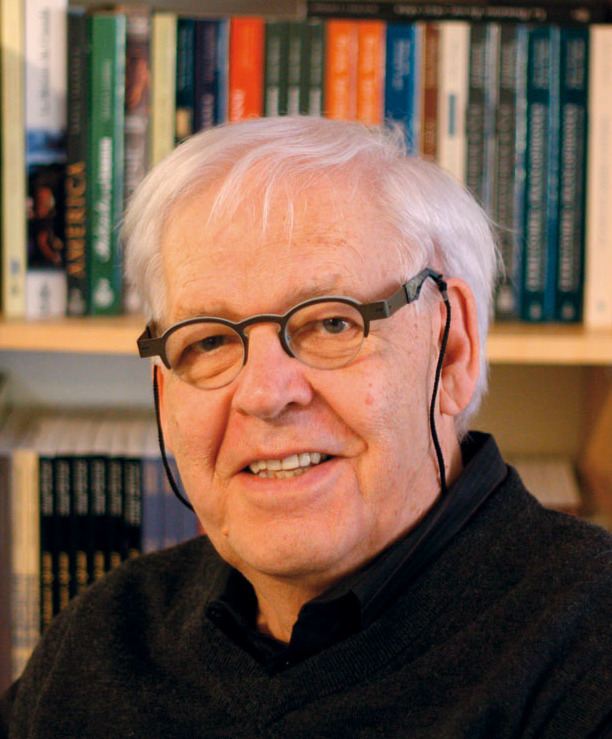

Member of the National Assembly of Quebec for Trois-Rivières
- In office November 15, 1976 – January 31, 1985
- Preceded by: Guy Bacon
- Succeeded by: Paul Philibert

Personal details
- Born: September 7, 1935 (age 91) Saint-Tite, Quebec
- Party: Parti Québecois
- Profession: Author, Publisher, Historian

Denis Vaugeois CM OQ (born September 7, 1935) is a French-speaking author, publisher and historian from Quebec, Canada. He also served as a Member of the National Assembly (MNA) from 1976 to 1985.

== Biography ==
He was born in Saint-Tite, a small town north of Trois-Rivières and has always considered himself as a child of the Mauricie, where his immigrant ancestors settled in the middle of the 19th century. They were among the first Europeans to settle as high as the Mékinac River in the upper Saint-Maurice River area. His family moved to Trois-Rivières in 1942 and his father signed him up in the Jardin de l'Enfance where he was taught by nuns from Brittany, in France, who were also related to the Vaugeois family. That choice would have a major influence on him, first because of the nuns concern for language and also because there was a children's library on the way to school. It was like a calling, books!

He took his "cours classique" at the séminaire Saint-Joseph de Trois-Rivières and opted to study arts and education. Then he went on to the École normale Jacques-Cartier and the Faculty of Arts of the Université de Montréal. Two professors particularly influenced him, Jan de Groot and Maurice Séguin. The former taught the importance of work, while the latter introduced him to history.

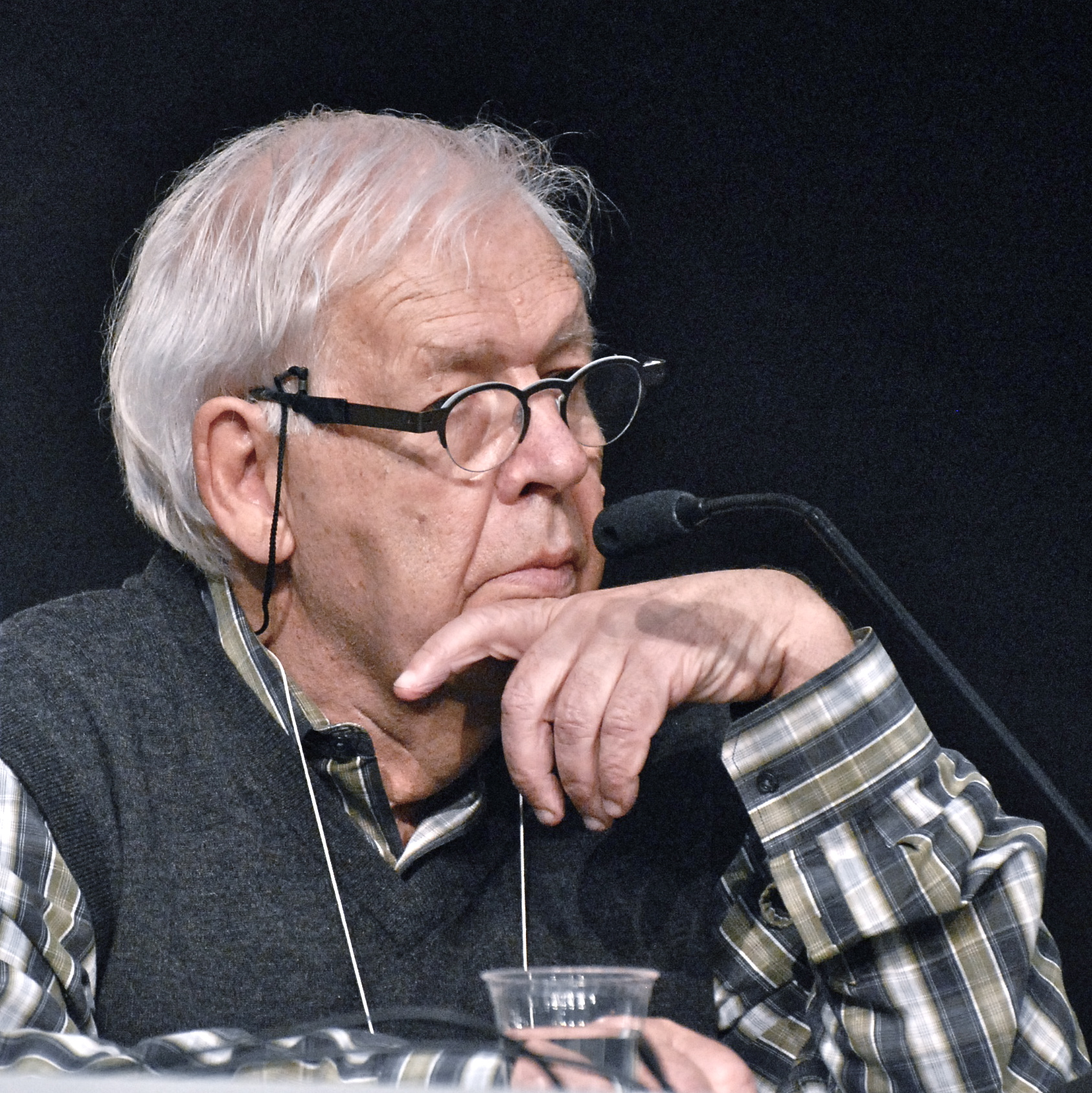
Denis Vaugeois in 2012

He began teaching history in several institutions while pursuing his education towards a degree in arts, a degree in education, and doctoral studies in history. In 1963 he participated to the creation of Boreal Express with Jacques Lacourcière and the librarian and student Pierre Gravel, at that time participating to the creation of the Comite international pour l'indépendance du Québec. He also started to get in touch with a famous engineer, closely linked with politicians Gordon Boisseau.

In 1965, he became the first head of studies in history of Quebec's newly created Education Ministry. Extremely disappointed by the orientation of education reform, which the people rejected by sending the Liberal Party back into the opposition in the 1966 elections, he turned towards international activities. After being co-director of the Centre franco-québécois de développement pédagogique (the France-Quebec education development centre), he became executive director of Quebec's international relations and, in that capacity, worked on developing the network of Quebec delegations and houses abroad.

In 1976, he was elected Member of the National Assembly for Trois-Rivières and became a member of René-Lévesque's Cabinet in 1978. Appointed Minister of Cultural Affairs, he devoted much effort to the defense of Quebec's heritage and the development of its network of libraries and museums. He also took on responsibility for the Ministry of Communications during the 1980 referendum and he denounced what he claimed was illegal spending done by the Liberal Party led by Pierre Trudeau. Following a disagreement with Premier Lévesque concerning development of the Quebec territory, he left the cabinet in 1981 and then left politics in 1985. He went back to publishing. Feeling some nostalgia for the years devoted to Les éditions du Boréal, which he had founded with others in 1962, he decided to found Les éditions du Septentrion.

As in the past, he combines management with research. The Atlantic world interests him, and more specifically, the history of the French in the Americas and their meeting with the first inhabitants and the constant and multi-formed exchange with immigrants from throughout the world. His work, both books and radio and television, bear witness to the progress of what he has qualified as the "Quebec melting pot".

== Bibliography ==
Author of:

- L'Union des deux Canadas (1791–1840), Éditions du Bien public, Montréal, 1962.
- Les Juifs et la Nouvelle-France, éditions du Boréal, 1968.
- L'Assemblée nationale en devenir. Pour un meilleur équilibre de nos institutions, Québec, 1982.
- Québec 1792. Les acteurs, les institutions et les frontières, Éditions Fides, Montréal, 1992.
- La Fin des alliances franco-indiennes, éditions du Boréal, Montréal, 1995.
- Les Hurons de Lorette (Dir.), éditions du Septentrion, Québec, 1996.
- America. L’expédition de Lewis & Clark et la naissance d’une nouvelle puissance, éditions du Septentrion, Québec, 2002.
- The Last French and Indian War, McGill-Queen’s University Press, Montréal, 2002.
- America. The Lewis and Clark Expedition and the Dawn of a New Power, Véhicule Press, Montréal, 2005.
- L’Amour du livre. L’édition au Québec, ses petits secrets et ses mystères, éditions du Septentrion, Québec, 2005.
- Les Premiers Juifs d'Amérique, 1760–1860. L'extraordinaire histoire de la famille Hart, éditions du Septentrion, Québec, 2011.
- The First Jews in North America. The Extraordinary Story of the Hart Family 1760–1860, Baraka Books, Montréal, 2011.

== In collaboration ==
- Le Boréal Express 1534–1760, Boréal Express, 1964. Collectif. Réédité en 2009 aux éditions du Septentrion, Québec.
- Le Boréal Express 1760–1810, Boréal Express, 1964. Collectif. Réédité en 2010 aux éditions du Septentrion, Québec.
- Histoire 1534–1968, éditions du Renouveau pédagogique, 1968. Réédité en 1969 sous le titre Canada-Québec – Synthèse historique.
- Les troubles de 1837–1838 (dossier d'histoire), Éditions Fides, 1969, en collaboration avec Jacques Lacoursière.
- L'Acte de Québec et l'Invasion américaine (dossier d'histoire), Éditions Fides, 1970, en collaboration avec Jacques Lacoursière.
- Le Boréal Express 1810–1841, Boréal Express, 1972. Collectif. Réédité en 2010 aux éditions du Septentrion, Québec.
- L’Indien généreux. Ce que le monde doit aux Amériques, éditions du Boréal, 1992, coauteur avec Louise Côté et Louis Tardivel.
- Canada-Québec, 1534–2000, les éditions du Septentrion, Québec, 2000, directeur et coauteur avec Jacques Lacoursière et Jean Provencher.
- The Last French and Indian War, McGill-Queen's University Press, Montréal, 2002, translated by Käthe Roth.
- La generosidad del indigena. Dones de las Americas al mundo, Fondo, 2003, en collaboration avec Socorro Arias (trad.).
- Champlain. La naissance de l’Amérique française, les éditions du Septentrion, Québec, 2004, codirecteur avec Raymonde Litalien.
- Champlain. The Birth of French America, McGill-Queen's University Press, Montréal, 2004, Edited with Raymonde Litalien.
- John Lambert, Voyage au Canada dans les années 1806, 1807 et 1808, les éditions du Septentrion, Québec, 2006, traduit et annoté avec Roch Côté.
- La Mesure d’un continent. Atlas historique de l’Amérique du Nord, 1492–1814, les éditions du Septentrion, Québec, 2007, coauteur avec Raymonde Litalien et Jean-François Palomino.
- Mapping a continent. Historical Atlas of North America, 1492–1814, McGill-Queen's University Press, Montréal, 2007, in collaboration with Raymonde Litalien and Jean-François Palomino.
- L’Impasse amérindienne. Trois commissions d’enquête à l’origine d’une politique de tutelle et d’assimilation, 1828–1858, les éditions du Septentrion, Québec, 2010, codirecteur avec Michel Lavoie.

== Honours and distinctions ==
- 1996 – Finalist for the Governor General's Literary Prize for La Fin des alliances franco-indiennes.
- 1997 – Prix Samuel de Champlain awarded by the Institut France-Canada (France-Amériques).
- 2004 – Prix littéraire (mention) de l’Académie de marine (France) pour America. L’expédition de Lewis & Clark et la naissance d’une nouvelle puissance.
- 2005 – Finalist for the Governor General's Literary Prize pour America. The Lewis & Clark Expedition and the Dawn of a New Power, traduction de Jane Brierley.
- 2008 – Prix Gérard-Parizeau for his works on French-speaking America.
- 2008 – Prix Hercule Louis Catenacci awarded by the Académie des sciences morales et politiques (France), together with Raymonde Litalien and Jean-François Palomino, for La Mesure d’un continent.
- 2008 – Prix Marcel Couture awarded by the Salon du livre de Montréal, together with Raymonde Litalien and Jean-François Palomino, for La Mesure d’un continent.
- 2008 – Special mention by the jury for the Prix Lionel Groulx, together with Raymonde Litalien and Jean-François Palomino, for La Mesure d’un continent.
- 2008 – Honorary degree from the faculty of Arts and Sciences of the Université de Montréal.
- 2009 – Recognition by the Corporation des bibliothécaires professionnels du Québec on the occasion of the Corporation's 40th anniversary for his exceptional contribution to the development of libraries and information centres in Québec.
- 2009 – Prix René-Chaloult awarded by the Amicale des anciens parlementaires du Québec, from the Quebec National Assembly by its président André Harvey.
- 2011 – Honorary doctorate in Lettres from the Université Laval.
- 2011 – Finalist for the Prix Marcel-Couture for Les premiers Juifs d’Amérique 1760-1860, Septentrion, 2011.
- 2012 – Recipient of the Pix Lauréat Le Soleil/Radio-Canada, in the category « Société », février 2012.
- 2012 – Winner of the Helen & Stan Vine Canadian Jewish Book Award for History offered by the Koffler Foundation for Les premiers Juifs d’Amérique 1760-1860, Septentrion, 2011.
- 2012 – Prix Percy-W.-Foy from the Société historique de Montréal for Les premiers Juifs d’Amérique 1760-1860, Septentrion, 2011.
- 2012 – Prix Fleury-Mesplet awarded by the Salon du livre de Montréal.
- 2012 – Prix Adagio awarded by the Salon du livre de Trois-Rivières.

== Footnotes ==
National Assembly of Quebec
Preceded by Guy Bacon (Liberal)	MNA, District of Trois-Rivières; 1976–1985	Succeeded by Paul Philibert (Liberal)
Preceded by Louis O'Neill (PQ)	Minister of Cultural Affairs; 1978–1981	Succeeded by Clément Richard (PQ)
