= Louis-Charles Boucher de Niverville =

Lawyer and political figure in Quebec

Mayor of Trois-Rivières
- In office 1863–1865
- Preceded by: Joseph-Édouard Turcotte
- Succeeded by: Sévère Dumoulin

Member of the Legislative Assembly of the Province of Canada for Trois-Rivières
- In office 1865–1866
- Preceded by: Joseph-Édouard Turcotte
- Succeeded by: Institution abolished

Member of the Canadian Parliament for Trois-Rivières
- In office 1867–1868
- Succeeded by: William McDougall

Member of the Legislative Assembly of Quebec for Trois-Rivières
- In office 1867–1868
- Succeeded by: Sévère Dumoulin

Personal details
- Born: August 12, 1825 Trois-Rivières, Lower Canada
- Died: August 1, 1869 (aged 43) Trois-Rivières, Quebec
- Party: Conservative

Louis-Charles Boucher de Niverville, QC (August 12, 1825 – August 1, 1869) was a Quebec lawyer and political figure. He represented Trois-Rivières in the House of Commons of Canada.

== Early background ==
He was born in Trois-Rivières, Lower Canada on August 12, 1825. He studied at the Séminaire de Nicolet, went on to study law and was called to the bar in 1849.

== Before 1867 ==
Boucher de Niverville was the Mayor of Trois-Rivières from 1863 to 1865.

He was elected as a member of the Parti bleu to the Legislative Assembly of the Province of Canada for Trois-Rivières in an 1865 by-election. He succeeded Joseph-Édouard Turcotte who had recently died. Boucher de Niverville spoke in the Assembly in favour of the Quebec Resolutions in 1865.

== After 1867 ==
After the British North America Act 1867 was enacted, Boucher de Niverville joined the Conservative Party. The district of Trois-Rivières elected him to both the House of Commons and the Legislative Assembly of Quebec. He was also appointed to the Queen's Counsel.

== After retirement from politics ==
In 1868, he retired from politics and accepted the post of sheriff for the district of Trois-Rivières.

He died in Trois-Rivières on August 1, 1869, after suffering from lung disease.
