= Joseph-Édouard Turcotte =

Lawyer, politician and businessman in Lower Canada

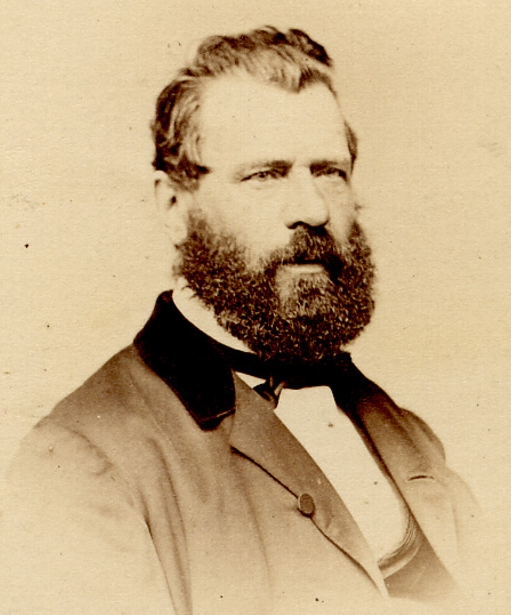

7th Speaker of the Legislative Assembly of the Province of Canada
- In office 1862–1863
- Preceded by: Sir Henry Smith
- Succeeded by: Lewis Wallbridge

Solicitor General for Lower Canada
- In office December 8, 1847 – March 10, 1848
- Preceded by: Joseph-André Taschereau
- Succeeded by: Thomas Cushing Aylwin

Member of the Legislative Assembly of the Province of Canada for Saint Maurice
- In office 1841–1844
- Preceded by: New position
- Succeeded by: François Lesieur Desaulniers

Member of the Legislative Assembly of the Province of Canada
- In office 1851 – 1864 (four different electoral districts, five different elections; for details, see succession box at end of article)

Mayor of Trois-Rivières
- In office 1857–1863
- Preceded by: J.-B. Lajoie
- Succeeded by: Louis-Charles Boucher de Niverville

Personal details
- Born: October 10, 1808 Gentilly, Lower Canada
- Died: December 20, 1864 (aged 56) Trois-Rivières, Canada East, Province of Canada
- Party: 1841–1844: French-Canadian Group; 1852–1856: Ministerialist; 1857–1864: Bleu
- Spouse: Flore Buteau
- Relations: Arthur Turcotte (son); Gustave-Adolphe-Narcisse Turcotte (son); Ernest Pacaud (son-in-law)
- Children: 6 daughters, 4 boys
- Education: Séminaire de Nicolet; Collège de Sainte-Anne-de-la-Pocatière
- Occupation: Businessman, journalist
- Profession: Lawyer

Joseph-Édouard Turcotte (October 10, 1808 – December 20, 1864) was a lawyer, businessman, and political figure in Canada East (now Quebec). Born to a merchant family, he considered the priesthood, but after the loss of one arm in an accident, he opted instead for a legal career. In addition to the law, he was engaged in journalism and in business activities in Trois-Rivières.

When he entered politics during the turbulent period of the 1830s, Turcotte was one of the more radical supporters of the Parti patriote, led by Louis-Joseph Papineau. He did not participate in the Lower Canada Rebellion of 1837 directly, but continued to make speeches supporting the Patriote cause. He also applied successfully for writs of habeas corpus for Patriotes who had been arrested by the Lower Canada government.

Following the establishment of the Province of Canada in 1841, Turcotte continued his political career. He was a respected member of the Assembly, although he held only one executive position for a short time and was never a member of the Executive Council, the provincial cabinet.

Turcotte died in office as a member of the Legislative Assembly in 1864, at age 56.

== Family and early life ==
Turcotte was born in Gentilly, Lower Canada in 1808, the son of Joseph Turcotte and Marguerite Marchildon, and one of a large family. His father was a merchant in Gentilly. The Turcotte family was long-established in Lower Canada, descended from Abel Turcot, who had emigrated from Mouilleron-en-Pareds, in Poitou. Turcotte's branch of the family lived in the Trois-Rivières area.

He studied at the Séminaire de Nicolet, and then at the Collège de Sainte-Anne-de-la-Pocatière. During his schooling, he was attracted to the priesthood. In 1831, he lost his right arm in an accident. He decided not to pursue a future in the priesthood, but it is not known if that decision was related to his injury. Instead, he decided to pursue a career in the law. He articled with Elzéar Bédard and was called to the bar in 1836. He initially practised law at Quebec City. In 1839, he moved to Trois-Rivières, where he established his legal practice and business interests.

In 1842, Turcotte married Flore Buteau from Quebec. The couple had ten children, six daughters and four sons. His son Arthur Turcotte served as a member in the Legislative Assembly of Quebec and his son Gustave-Adolphe-Narcisse Turcotte was a member of the Canadian House of Commons. His daughter Marie-Louise married Ernest Pacaud, a Quebec lawyer and journalist.

== Lower Canada politics ==
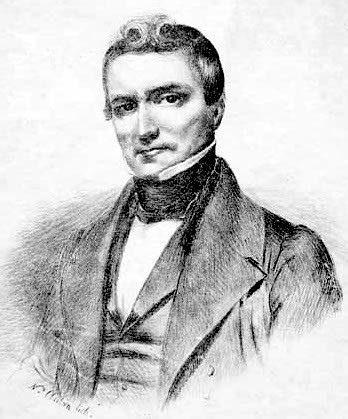
Louis-Joseph Papineau, leader of the Parti patriote

While he was articling, Turcotte became involved in the politics of Lower Canada. During the 1830s, the political climate was extremely heated. The Parti patriote, led by Louis-Joseph Papineau, was engaged in a major political and constitutional battle with the Governor General, appointed by the British government, and the oligarchic Legislative Council of Lower Canada, whose members were appointed by the Governor General and largely came from the British merchant and professional classes in Lower Canada. Turcotte began contributing pieces to La Minerve, one of the newspapers which supported the Parti patriote. His articles expressed liberal and eventually revolutionary views, reflecting current trends in French political theories.

Turcotte became one of the more radical Patriote followers of Papineau. In 1835, he was a candidate in a by-election in the Nicolet area, but was defeated by Jean-Baptiste Hébert. In 1837, in a by-election in Quebec's Lower Town, he took part in the ultimately unsuccessful campaign for the Patriote candidate; the seat was won by John Munn, who supported the government. In September 1837, as political tensions rose, Turcotte was one of the founding members the Comité permanent de Québec, established to coordinate the political activities of the Patriotes in the Quebec area.

The Lower Canada Rebellion broke out in November 1837. Turcotte did not participate in the armed rebellion, but he continued to make speeches supporting the Patriote cause. He also successfully applied to the courts for writs of habeas corpus to free various Patriotes who had been arrested, even though the provincial government had attempted to suspend the writ during the Rebellion.

== Province of Canada ==
=== First Parliament, 1841–1844 ===
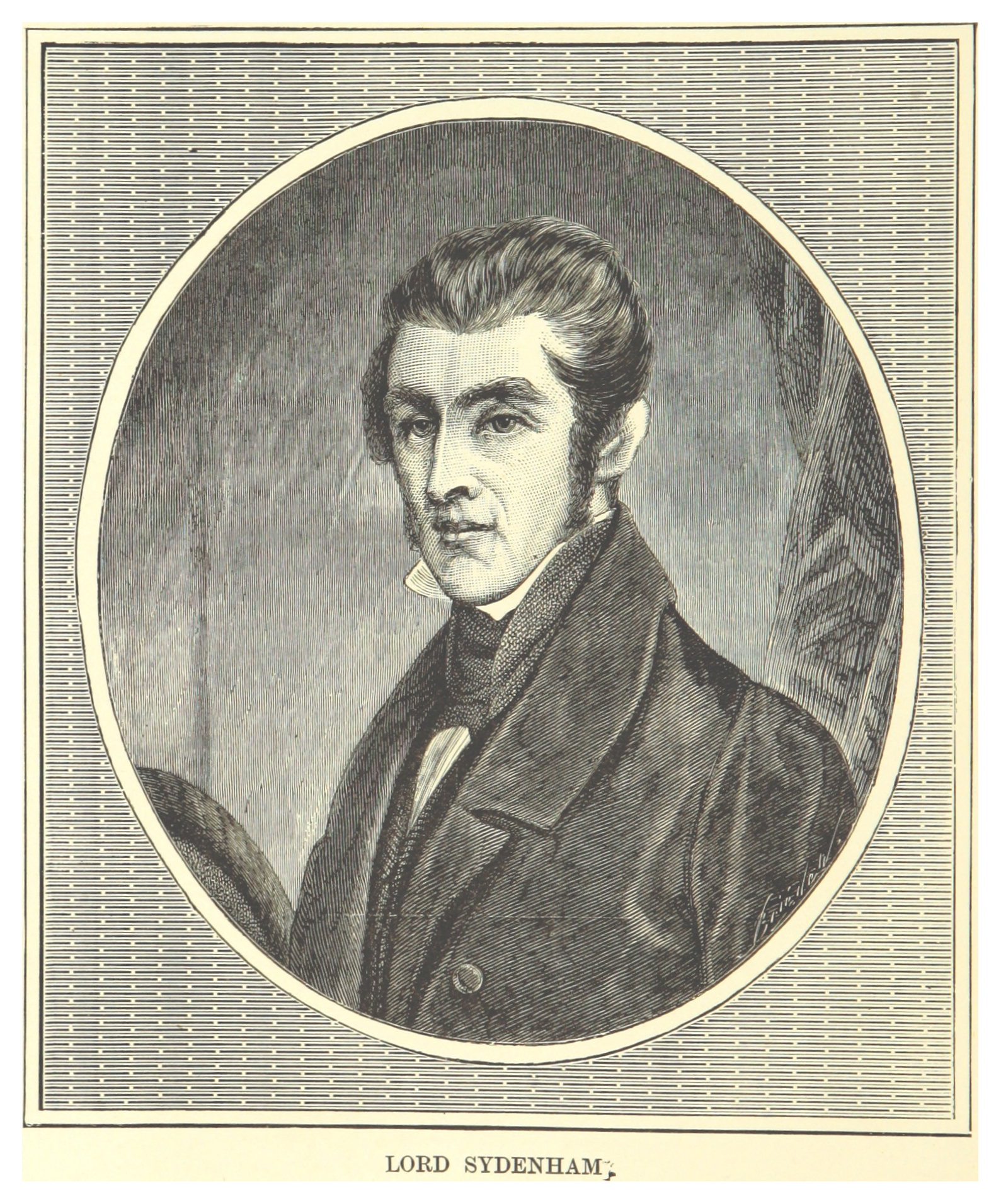
Lord Sydenham, first Governor General of the Province of Canada

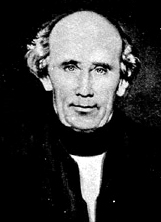
John Neilson, who introduced the motion condemning the union

Following the rebellion in Lower Canada, and the similar rebellion in 1837 in Upper Canada (now Ontario), the British government decided to merge the two provinces into a single province, as recommended by Lord Durham in the Durham Report. The Union Act, 1840, passed by the British Parliament, abolished the two provinces and their separate parliaments, and created the Province of Canada, with a single Parliament for the entire province, composed of an elected Legislative Assembly and an appointed Legislative Council. The Governor General initially retained a strong position in the government.

The first general elections for the Legislative Assembly were held in the spring of 1841. Turcotte stood for election for the Saint-Maurice riding, campaigning against the union of the Canadas. His opponent was a supporter of the union, Colonel Bartholomew Gugy, who had led troops in the suppression of the Rebellion. Turcotte was successful, in part because his supporters seized the single polling place in the constituency and dominated the open voting, a practice typical of the violent elections at that time.

In the first session of the new Parliament, Turcotte was part of the French-Canadian Group, an informal group of members from Canada East, initially led by John Neilson from Quebec and Denis-Benjamin Viger from Montreal. The members of the Group were generally opposed to the government of the Governor General, Lord Sydenham. One of the first orders of business for the Assembly was a motion introduced by Neilson, condemning the way the union had been imposed on Lower Canada. Turcotte, like all the other members of the French-Canadian group, voted against the union, but the motion was defeated by those who supported the union, from Canada East and also Canada West. In other votes in the 1841 session, Turcotte was a consistent opponent of Governor General Lord Sydenham.

In December 1841, Turcotte was appointed to a government position, a translator of laws. Under the traditional law relating to the independence of Parliament, he was required to resign his seat upon accepting an office of profit under the Crown, which he did effective December 6, 1841. In April 1842, he was also appointed secretary of the commission on seigneurial tenure. A by-election was held in July 1842, and he was re-elected by his constituents, ratifying his acceptance of the two positions.

Turcotte was a consistent supporter of LaFontaine and the Reform movement for the rest of the term of the Parliament. However, in the 1844 general elections, there was a split in the French-Canadian Group, between LaFontaine and Denis-Benjamin Viger, who had replaced LaFontaine as head of the government. Turcotte stood for election as a supporter of Viger, although he also campaigned for supporters of LaFontaine. He was criticised heavily for the position he took, and was defeated in Saint-Maurice by François Lesieur Desaulniers, who supported LaFontaine.

=== Solicitor General, 1847–1848 ===
Although defeated in 1844, Turcotte continued to be involved in politics. In late 1847, the government, now headed by a Compact Tory from Toronto, Henry Sherwood, and a "British Tory" from Canada East, Denis-Benjamin Papineau, was having trouble filling the position of solicitor general for Lower Canada East. He accepted the position in December, 1847.

However, in the general elections in January, 1848, he was defeated in two attempts to win a seat. Louis-Joseph Papineau defeated him in Saint-Maurice, and Louis Guillet defeated him in the riding of Champlain. (At that time, an individual could be a candidate in more than one constituency.) The Sherwood–Papineau ministry was also defeated and resigned their positions in March 1848, to be replaced by LaFontaine and Baldwin. As part of the defeated ministry, Turcotte also resigned.

=== Subsequent Parliaments, 1851 to 1864 ===
From 1851 until his death in 1864, Turcotte was a member of the Legislative Assembly, although elected from four different constituencies during that period. As party identities developed, he also shifted from Reform to the Parti bleu.

His electoral history was as follows:

- 1851: elected again in Saint-Maurice, as a Reformer/Ministerialist;
- 1854: elected in the new riding of Maskinongé, again as a Ministerialist;
- 1858: elected in Champlain, now as a Bleu;
- 1861 and 1863: elected in Three-Rivers, as a Bleu.

From 1862 to 1863, Turcotte served as Speaker of the Legislative Assembly.

== Business enterprises ==
Turcotte played an important role in the economic development of the Trois-Rivières region. He was involved in the operation of a local ironworks, the construction of a large hotel at Shawinigan Falls, and the extension of the town wharf. He helped with the foundation of the Collège de Trois-Rivières, as well as the funding and construction of a branch line of the Grand Trunk Railway linking Trois-Rivières to Arthabaska. He was the owner and editor of the Journal des Trois-Rivières from 1847 to 1853.

In municipal politics, Turcotte was mayor of Trois-Rivières from 1857 to 1863.

== Death and legacy ==
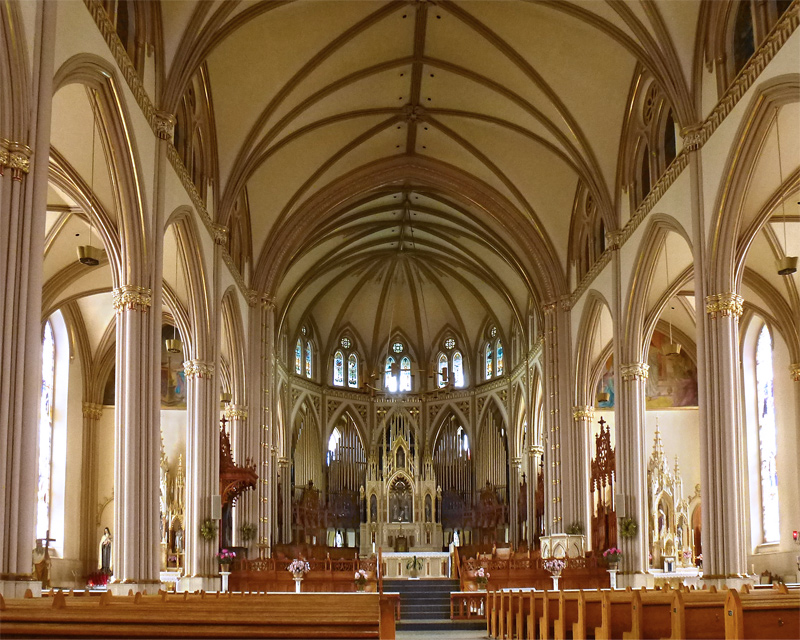
Interior of the Church of the Immaculate Conception, Trois-Rivières

Turcotte died in Trois-Rivières December 20, 1864. He was buried from the Church of the Immaculate Conception.

Turcotte left an impressive record as a parliamentarian. He was recognised as an exceptional speaker, able to participate in the debates on a wide range of topics in the Assembly. He was well-respected. One journalist, Benjamin Sulte commented: "Although a plain member, he was listened to as if he were a minister." After the retirements of LaFontaine, Baldwin, and Augustin-Norbert Morin, Turcotte stood out as one of the last veterans of the Reform movement in the Assembly.

== See also ==
- 1st Parliament of the Province of Canada
- 4th Parliament of the Province of Canada
- 5th Parliament of the Province of Canada
- 6th Parliament of the Province of Canada
- 7th Parliament of the Province of Canada
- 8th Parliament of the Province of Canada

Political offices
Preceded by Louis-Joseph Papineau, French-Canadian Group / Liberal	MLA, District of Saint-Maurice; 1851–1854	Succeeded by Louis-Léon Lesieur Desaulniers, Ministerialist / Parti bleu
Preceded by District created in 1853	MLA, District of Maskinongé; 1854–1857	Succeeded by Louis-Honoré Gauvreau, Parti bleu
Preceded by Thomas Marchildon, Parti rouge	MLA, District of Champlain; 1858–1861	Succeeded by John Jones Ross, Parti bleu
Preceded by William McDonell Dawson, Conservative	MLA, District of Three Rivers; 1861–1864	Succeeded by Louis-Charles Boucher de Niverville, Parti bleu
