= Charles-Borromée Genest =

Canadian politician

Member of the Legislative Assembly of Quebec for Trois-Rivières
- In office 1868–1869
- Preceded by: Sévère Dumoulin
- Succeeded by: Henri-Gédéon Malhiot

Personal details
- Born: October 4, 1832 Gentilly, Lower Canada
- Died: January 14, 1873 (aged 40) Trois-Rivières, Quebec
- Party: Conservative

Charles-Borromée Genest (October 4, 1832 – January 14, 1873) was a politician from Quebec, Canada.

== Background ==
He was born on October 4, 1832, in Gentilly, Mauricie.

== Political career ==
He ran as a Conservative candidate in the federal district of Trois-Rivières in 1867 and lost.

Genest won a provincial by-election in the district of Trois-Rivières in 1869. He lost his bid for re-election in 1871, against another Conservative, Henri-Gédéon Malhiot.

== Death ==
He died on January 14, 1873, in Trois-Rivières.
