= Danielle St-Amand =

Canadian politician

MNA for Trois-Rivières
- In office 2008–2014
- Preceded by: Sébastien Proulx
- Succeeded by: Jean-Denis Girard

Personal details
- Born: April 8, 1964 (age 62) Sainte-Thècle, Quebec
- Party: Liberal

Danielle St-Amand (born April 8, 1964) is a politician in the Canadian province of Quebec, who was elected to represent the riding of Trois-Rivières in the National Assembly of Quebec in the 2008 provincial election. She is a member of the Quebec Liberal Party.

She now works as a business coach and strategy advisor at Concordia Cabinet-conseil inc. in Trois-Rivières.

Prior to her political career, Saint-Amand worked 14 years in the field of education and was manager for the Mauricie Tourism Association and the Trois-Rivières hospital Foundation (financial campaign). In 2007, she was the manager for the Saint-Tite Western Festival.

She was rewarded in 2003 for a Management Award by the Association des professionnels en gestion philanthropique du Québec.
