= Gilles Beaudoin =

Canadian politician

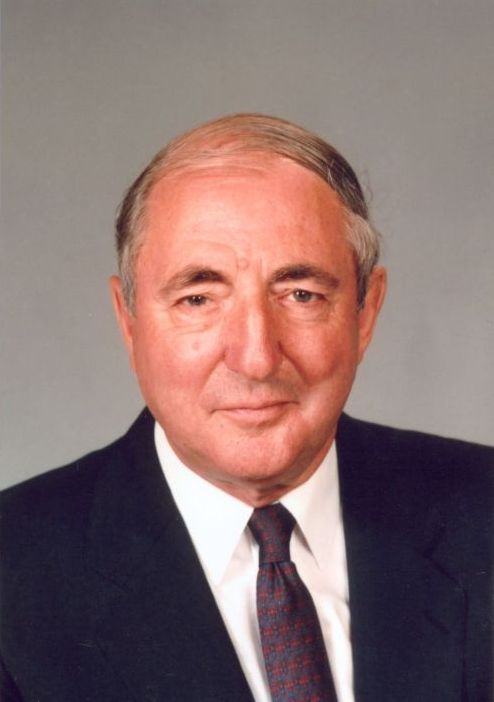
- Gilles Beaudoin in 1990

Mayor of Trois-Rivières, Quebec
- In office 1970–1990
- Preceded by: René Matteau
- Succeeded by: Guy Leblanc

Personal details
- Born: October 12, 1919
- Died: August 22, 2007 (aged 87)

Gilles Beaudoin (October 12, 1919 – August 22, 2007) was a Canadian politician who served as the mayor of Trois-Rivières from 1970 to 1990.

== Background ==
Beaudoin was born on October 12, 1919. He owned and managed a furniture store located on rue Champflour. He married Dolorès Blais in 1943 and was the father of five children.

== Political career ==
Beaudoin was elected as the mayor of Trois-Rivières, Quebec in 1970. He was re-elected in 1974, 1978, 1982 and 1986. He did not run for re-election in 1990. He was the longest-serving mayor of Trois-Rivières.

== Achievements ==
His accomplishments include:

- the advent of the 1975 Jeux du Québec (Quebec Games) finals;
- the beautification of the port of Trois-Rivières;
- the completion of Hôtel Delta's convention center;
- the construction of the pont Radisson (Radisson Bridge);
- the opening of the Salle J.-Antonio-Thompson concert hall and
- the revitalization of downtown Trois-Rivières.

== Death ==
Beaudoin died on August 22, 2007.
