= André Gabias =

Canadian politician

Member of the National Assembly of Quebec for Trois-Rivières
- In office 2003–2007
- Preceded by: Guy Julien
- Succeeded by: Sébastien Proulx

Personal details
- Born: May 20, 1956 (age 69) Trois-Rivières, Quebec
- Party: Liberal

André Gabias (born May 20, 1956) is a lawyer, governance expert and politician in Quebec, Canada. He holds a degree in law from the Université de Sherbrooke, and has been a member of the Quebec Bar since 1981. Since 1984, he has taught law at the Université du Québec à Trois-Rivières (UQTR) and was a member of the National Assembly of Quebec. He represented the electoral district of Trois-Rivières and is a member of the Quebec Liberal Party (QLP).

== Biography ==
Born in Trois-Rivières, Quebec, Gabias was first elected in the 2003 election, and originally served as the Parliamentary Assistant to the Minister of Public Security. In the spring of 2005, he was appointed as the Parliamentary Assistant to the Minister of Economic Development, Innovation and Export Trade.

Gabias is preceded in his political career by his father, past Trois-Rivières MLA and Union Nationale Minister Yves Gabias, and his grandfather Joseph-Maurice Gabias, once Liberal MLA for Montréal—Saint-Henri and Assistant Mayor of the City of Montreal. Prior to serving as a member of the Quebec legislature, he maintained a private civil and commercial practice in municipal and administrative law. He is also the founder and President of the Jeune Chambre de Commerce (Junior Chamber of Commerce) of the Mauricie, and is the founder of Opération Nez rouge (Operation Red Nose) for Trois-Rivières.

In the 2007 Quebec elections, Gabias lost the seat to the Action démocratique du Québec's Sébastien Proulx who had received the support of Trois-Rivières mayor Yves Lévesque during the campaign.

He served as board chair of the Musée québécois de culture populaire from July 2013 until March 2014, and was secretary general of UQTR from February 2008 until May 2014.
