= Louis-Philippe Mercier =

Canadian politician

Louis-Philippe Mercier was a politician from Quebec, Canada.

== Background ==
He was born on September 4, 1877, in Fraserville, Quebec (now Rivière-du-Loup). He was a notary public and a senior army officer of the local military reserve.

== Member of the legislature ==
He ran as a Liberal candidate in a 1921 provincial by-election in the district of Trois-Rivières and won, succeeding Joseph-Adolphe Tessier who had recently died.

Mercier was re-elected in 1923, but was defeated by Conservative rising political star Maurice Duplessis in 1927.

== Retirement from Politics ==
Mercier was sheriff of Trois-Rivières from 1931 until his death. He died on March 16, 1961.

== Footnotes ==
National Assembly of Quebec
Preceded by Joseph-Adolphe Tessier, Liberal	MLA, District of Trois-Rivières; 1921–1927	Succeeded by Maurice Duplessis, Conservative
