= List of mayors of Trois-Rivières =

The mayor is the highest elected official in Trois-Rivières, in the Mauricie region of Quebec. Since its incorporation in 1845, the city has had thirty-six mayors.

The mayor presides over the Trois-Rivières City Council.

== List ==
This is a list of mayors of the city of Trois-Rivières.

#	Mayor	Taking Office	Leaving
1	Pierre-Benjamin Dumoulin	1845	1846
2	Antoine Polette	1846	1853
3	John McDougall	1854	1855
4	J.-B. Lajoie	1855	1857
5	Joseph-Édouard Turcotte	1857	1863
6	Louis-Charles Boucher de Niverville	1863	1865
7	Sévère Dumoulin	1865	1869
8	Joseph-Moïse Désilet	1869	1872
9	Joseph-Napoléon Bureau	1872	1873
10	Télesphore-Eusèbe Normand	1873	1876
11	Arthur Turcotte	1876	1877
9	Joseph-Napoléon Bureau	1877	1879
7	Sévère Dumoulin	1879	1885
12	Henri-Gédéon Malhiot	1885	1888
13	J.-E. Hétu	1888	1889
10	Télesphore-Eusèbe Normand	1889	1894
14	Philippe-Elisée Panneton	1894	1896
15	Richard-Stanislas Cooke	1896	1898
16	Arthur Olivier	1898	1900
17	Louis-Docithé Paquin	1900	1902
18	N.-L. Denoncourt	1902	1904
19	Nérée Le Noblet Duplessis	1904	1905
17	Louis-Docithé Paquin	1905	1905
20	J.-F. Bellefeuille	1905	1906
21	François-Siméon Tourigny	1906	1908
23	Louis-Philippe Normand	1908	1913
24	Joseph-Adolphe Tessier	1913	1921
23	Louis-Philippe Normand	1921	1923
25	Arthur Bettez	1923	1931
26	J.-H. Robichon	1931	1937
27	Atchez Pitt	1937	1941
28	Arthur Rousseau	1941	1949
29	Joseph-Alfred Mongrain	1949	1953
30	Léo Leblanc	1953	1955
31	Laurent Paradis	1955	1960
29	Joseph-Alfred Mongrain	1960	1963
32	Gérard Dufresne	1963	1966
33	René Matteau	1966	1970
34	Gilles Beaudoin	1970	1990
35	Guy Leblanc	1990	2001
36	Yves Lévesque	2002	2019
37	Jean Lamarche	2019	2025
38	Jean-François Aubin	2025	present

Officially, elections to the Trois-Rivières Council are on a non-partisan basis.
