= Aeneas Dawson =

Scottish-Canadian priest and writer

- Born: 30 July 1810; Scotland
- Died: 29 December 1894 (aged 84); Ottawa, Ontario, Canada
- Occupations: Priest, writer

Aeneas McDonell Dawson (30 July 1810 – 29 December 1894) was a Scottish-Canadian Roman Catholic priest and writer.

== Life ==
Dawson studied at the seminary of Paris and was ordained a priest in 1835. Until 1840 he laboured on the mission of Dumfries, Scotland, and subsequently in Edinburgh. He was in Dunfermline in 1846. Before immigrating to Canada in 1855, he had successive charge of the counties of Fife, Kinross, and Clackmannan.

On his arrival in Canada he was given the parish of St. Andrew's, Ottawa, and later became preacher at the cathedral. Dawson was a lecturer of repute and a frequent contributor to the provincial press. He was the brother of two politicians: William McDonell Dawson and Simon James Dawson.

== Works ==
- The Temporal Sovereignty of the Pope (Ottawa and London, 1860), the first book printed and published in Ottawa
- St. Vincent de Paul: A Biography (London, 1865)
- Seven Letters together with a Lecture on the Colonies of Great Britain (Ottawa, 1870)
- The Late Hon. Thomas D'Arcy McGee. A Funeral Oration (Ottawa, 1870)
- Our Strength and Their Strength: The Northwest Territory and Other Papers, Chiefly Relating to the Dominion of Canada (Ottawa, 1870) - the first title heads a refutation of Goldwin Smith's anti-clerical views; under the last comes a series of poems, discourses, lectures, critical reviews
- Pius IX and his Time (London, 1880)

He translated from the French:

- Maître Pierre. Conversations on Morality, by M. Delcasott (Paris, 1836)
- The Parish Priest and His Parishioners, or Answer to Popular Prejudices against Religion, by M. B. D'Exauvillez (Glasgow, 1842), reviewed in The Tablet, London, 12 Feb., 1842
- Letters of same author on the Spanish Inquisition (London, 1848)
- Count Joseph de Maistre's celebrated work on the Pope (London, 1850)
- Soirées de S. Pétersbourg (London, 1851)

A list of his poems and other works is in the "Proceedings and Transactions of the Royal Society of Canada" (1894, XII, 23), of which he was a member.
