= Arthur Turcotte =

Canadian politician (1845–1905)

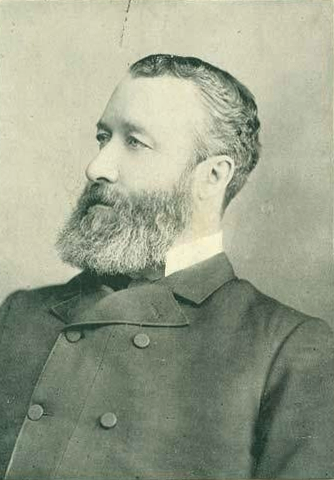

Member of the Legislative Assembly of Quebec for Trois-Rivières
- In office 1876–1881
- Preceded by: Henri-Gédéon Malhiot
- Succeeded by: Sévère Dumoulin
- In office 1884–1890
- Preceded by: Sévère Dumoulin
- Succeeded by: Télesphore-Eusèbe Normand

Personal details
- Born: January 19, 1845 Montreal, Canada East
- Died: October 12, 1905 (aged 60) Montreal, Quebec, Canada
- Party: Liberal

Arthur Turcotte (French pronunciation: [aʁtyʁ tyʁkɔt]; January 19, 1845 – October 12, 1905) was a Quebec lawyer, journalist and political figure.

He was born Arthur-Henri-René Turcotte in Montreal in 1845, the son of Joseph-Édouard Turcotte. He studied at the Jesuit Collège Sainte-Marie de Montréal and at Stonyhurst College in England. He then studied law at the Université Laval and McGill and was called to the bar in 1867. He began practice in Trois-Rivières. In 1872, he served as parliamentary correspondent in the provincial assembly for Le Canadien. In 1873, he became a member of the town council in Trois-Rivières and served as mayor from July 1876 to July 1877. Turcotte was elected to the Legislative Assembly of Quebec for Trois-Rivières in an 1876 by-election as an independent Conservative; he was re-elected in 1878. Turcotte served as speaker of the assembly from 1878 to 1882. He was named Queen's Counsel in 1878. In 1879, he helped found La Concorde, becoming its editor. He was defeated in 1881, now running as a Liberal but, after his opponent was unseated because he was accused of bribery, won the seat in an 1884 by-election; he was re-elected in 1886. Turcotte condemned the actions of the federal government during the North-West Rebellion, was part of the campaign in Quebec to save Louis Riel and supported autonomy for the Métis people. In 1884, after La Concorde ceased publication, he helped establish a new newspaper, La Sentinelle. In 1887, he was named minister without portfolio in the cabinet of Honoré Mercier and served as attorney general from 1888 to 1890. He was defeated in the 1890 election. Later that year, Turcotte was appointed protonotary for the Superior Court in Montreal district and served until his death in Montreal in 1905. He was buried in Trois-Rivières.

His brother Gustave-Adolphe served as a member of the House of Commons.

Political offices
Preceded by Télesphore-Eusèbe Normand	Mayor of Trois-Rivières; 1876–1877	Succeeded by Joseph-Napoléon Bureau
National Assembly of Quebec
Preceded by Louis Beaubien, Conservative	Speaker of the Legislative Assembly of Quebec; 1878–1882	Succeeded by Louis-Olivier Taillon, Conservative
