= Gilles Gauthier =

Canadian politician (1935–2015)

Member of the Legislative Assembly of Quebec for Trois-Rivières
- In office 1969–1970
- Preceded by: Yves Gabias
- Succeeded by: Guy Bacon

Personal details
- Born: September 3, 1935 Louiseville, Quebec, Canada
- Died: August 17, 2015 (aged 79)
- Party: Union Nationale

Gilles Gauthier (September 3, 1935 – August 17, 2015) was a Canadian politician from Quebec. He was a Member of the National Assembly.

== Background ==
Gilles Gauthier was born on September 3, 1935, in Louiseville, Quebec, and was a lawyer. He died on August 17, 2015, at the age of 79.

== Federal Politics ==
Gauthier ran as a Progressive Conservative candidate in the federal district of Trois-Rivières in 1968, but lost against Liberal incumbent Joseph-Alfred Mongrain.

== Member of the Legislature and work for the Montréal Conservatoire ==
Gauthier ran as a Union Nationale candidate in the district of Trois-Rivières in a 1969 by-election, following the resignation of Yves Gabias and won.

Gauthier lost his bid for re-election in 1970 and was defeated in the district of Champlain in 1976. In 1978-1979 he served as the interim director of the Conservatoire de musique du Québec à Montréal after Raymond Daveluy left the post. He was succeeded by Albert Grenier.
