= Trois-Rivières City Council =

Trois-Rivières City Council (in French: Conseil municipal de Trois-Rivières) is the governing body for the mayor–council government in the city of Trois-Rivières, in the Mauricie region of Quebec, Canada.

== Mayor ==
- Yves Lévesque (2001–2019)
- Jean Lamarche (2019–2025; elected in a by-election on May 5)
- Jean-François Aubin (2025–present)

== Councillors ==
As of the 2025 Trois-Rivières municipal election

Name	Party	District
Jean-François Aubin	Independent	Mayor
Annie Provencher	Independent	Carmel (1)
René Martin	Independent	Carrefours (2)
Jean-Denis Girard	Independent	Châteaudun (3)
Maryse Bellemare	Independent	Chavigny (4)
Pierre-Luc Fortin	Independent	Estacades (5)
Pierre Piché	Independent	Forges (6)
Gabrielle Groulx	Independent	La-Vérendrye (7)
Sabrina Roy	Independent	Madeleine (8)
Édith Lachance	Trois-Rivières Ville Forte	Marie-de-l'Incarnation (9)
François Bélisle	Independent	Pointe-du-Lac (10)
Vincent Héroux	Independent	Richelieu (11)
Nancy Sabourin	Independent	Richelieu (12)
Jean-François Lasnier	Independent	Sainte-Marthe (13)
Guy Daigle	Independent	Saint-Louis-de-France (14)

== See also ==
- List of mayors of Trois-Rivières
