= Jean Boulet (politician) =

Canadian politician

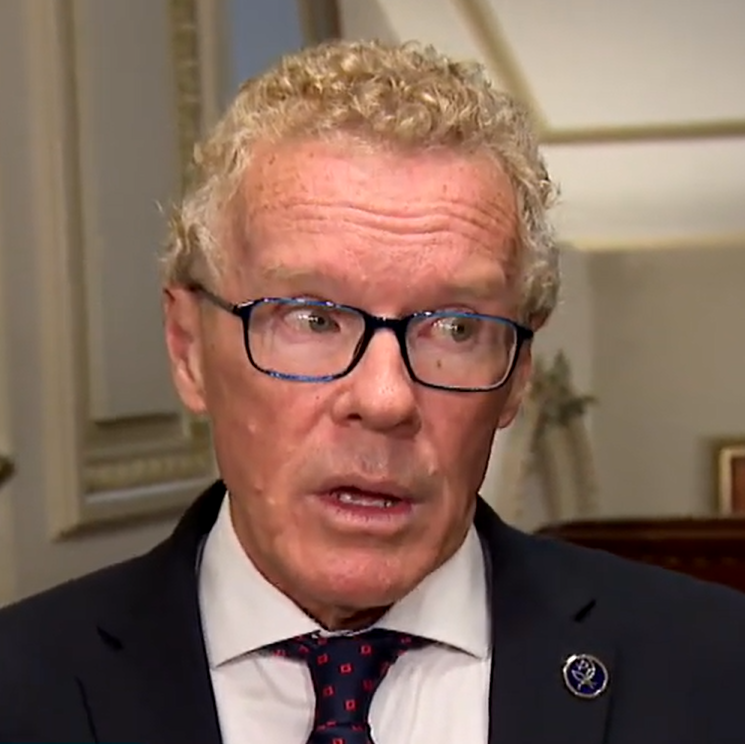
- Boulet in 2023

Quebec Minister of Labour
- In office October 18, 2018 – 2026
- Premier: François Legault; Christine Fréchette
- Preceded by: Dominique Vien
- Succeeded by: to be appointed

Member of the National Assembly of Quebec for Trois-Rivières
- In office October 1, 2018 – August 27, 2026
- Preceded by: Jean-Denis Girard
- Succeeded by: Jean Pellerin

Personal details
- Born: Saint-Tite
- Party: Coalition Avenir Québec
- Relatives: Julie Boulet (sister)

Jean Boulet is a Canadian politician who was elected to the National Assembly of Quebec in the 2018 provincial election. He represented the electoral district of Trois-Rivières as a member of the Coalition Avenir Québec (CAQ) until 2026.

His sister is former Quebec Liberal MNA Julie Boulet.

== Political career ==
Boulet was first elected to represent Trois-Rivières in the National Assembly of Quebec in 2018. On October 18, he was chosen by Premier François Legault to serve as Minister of Labour. He was re-elected in the 2022 election. He did not seek re-election in the 2026 general election.

=== 2022 immigration remarks controversy ===
A few days before the 2022 election, Boulet walked back from his past comments during a debate a few days before, stating that 80% of immigrants go to Montreal, don't work, don't speak French or don't adhere to the values of Quebec.

In response to the controversy, Liberal leader Dominique Anglade called for his removal as minister. Éric Duhaime, the leader of the Conservative Party of Quebec, called for Boulet to withdraw his candidacy.

== Electoral record ==
2022 Quebec general election: Trois-Rivières
Party	Candidate	Votes	%	±%
Coalition Avenir Québec	Jean Boulet	18,859	50.81	+9.74
Québec solidaire	Steven Roy Cullen	6,069	16.35	-0.83
Parti Québécois	Laurent Vézina	5,323	14.34	-1.09
Conservative	Karine Pépin	4,552	12.26	+10.55
Liberal	Adams Tekougoum	2,056	5.54	-17.3
Climat Québec	Éric Trottier	148	0.40	–
L'Union fait la force	Georges Samman	108	0.29	–
Total valid votes		37,115	98.69	
Total rejected ballots		492	1.31	
Turnout		37,607	68.72	
Electors on the lists		54,728		

2018 Quebec general election: Trois-Rivières
Party	Candidate	Votes	%	±%
Coalition Avenir Québec	Jean Boulet	15,323	41.07	+18.79
Liberal	Jean-Denis Girard	8,522	22.84	-16.32
Québec solidaire	Valérie Delage	6,411	17.18	+8.68
Parti Québécois	Marie-Claude Camirand	5,758	15.43	-12.96
Green	Adis Simidzija	653	1.75	
Conservative	Daniel Hénault	639	1.71	+0.84
Total valid votes		37,306	98.04	
Total rejected ballots		744	1.96	
Turnout		38,050	70.22	
Eligible voters		54,187		
Coalition Avenir Québec gain from Liberal		Swing		+17.56
Source(s) "Rapport des résultats officiels du scrutin". Élections Québec.
