= Richard-Stanislas Cooke =

Canadian politician

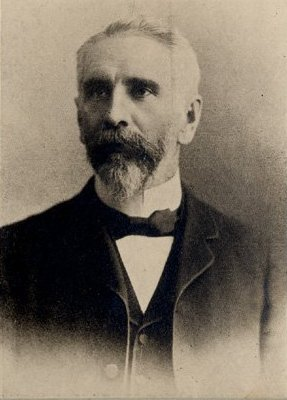

Member of the Legislative Assembly of Quebec for Trois-Rivières
- In office 1900–1904
- Preceded by: Télesphore-Eusèbe Normand
- Succeeded by: Joseph-Adolphe Tessier

Personal details
- Born: January 23, 1850 Trois-Rivières, Canada East
- Died: July 10, 1924 (aged 74) Trois-Rivières, Quebec
- Party: Liberal

Richard-Stanislas Cooke (January 23, 1850 – July 10, 1924) was a politician from Quebec, Canada.

== Background ==
He was born on January 23, 1850, in Trois-Rivières, Mauricie. He was a lawyer. He was married to Marie-Sara-Henriette-Louise Lajoie in 1877 and to Florence Genest in 1889.

== Mayor of Trois-Rivières ==
He was a Council member from 1880 to 1886 and from 1888 to 1889 and Mayor of Trois-Rivières from 1896 to 1898.

== Member of the legislature ==
He ran as a Liberal candidate in the district of Trois-Rivières in the 1892 general election and the by-election held in that same year. Each time he lost.

He was elected in 1900, but did not run for re-election in 1904.

== Retirement from Politics ==
Cooke was appointed judge in 1904. He died on July 10, 1924.

Political offices
Preceded by Philippe-Elisée Panneton	Mayor of Trois-Rivières; 1896-1898	Succeeded by Arthur Olivier
