= Télesphore-Eusèbe Normand =

Canadian politician

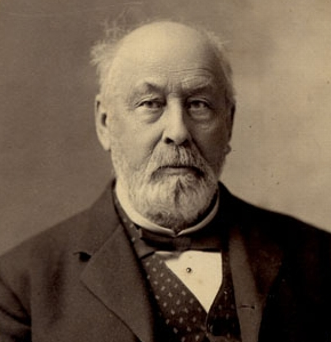

Member of the Legislative Assembly of Quebec for Trois-Rivières
- In office 1890–1900
- Preceded by: Arthur Turcotte
- Succeeded by: Richard-Stanislas Cooke

Personal details
- Born: August 18, 1832 Quebec City, Lower Canada
- Died: April 3, 1918 (aged 85) Trois-Rivières, Quebec
- Party: Liberal and Conservative

Télesphore-Eusèbe Normand (August 18, 1832 – April 3, 1918) was a politician from Quebec, Canada.

== Background ==
He was born on August 18, 1832, in Quebec City. He was a notary. He was married to Alphonsine Giroux in 1856 and to Marie Dufresne in 1893.

== Mayor of Trois-Rivières ==
Normand served as a Council member from 1861 to 1865 and as a Mayor of Trois-Rivières from 1873 to 1876 and from 1889 to 1894.

== Provincial Politics ==
He ran as a Liberal candidate in the district of Champlain in 1867 and 1871. Each time he lost. He also lost an 1876 by-election as a Conservative in the district of Trois-Rivières.

However he won the general election in the same district in 1890 and 1892. The 1892 general election was cancelled, but he won the by-election that followed. He was re-elected in 1897, but did not run for re-election in 1900.

== Death ==
Normand died on April 3, 1918.

== Footnotes ==
Political offices
Preceded by Joseph-Napoléon Bureau	Mayor of Trois-Rivières; 1873–1876	Succeeded by Arthur Turcotte
Preceded by J.-E. Hétu	Mayor of Trois-Rivières; 1889–1894	Succeeded by Philippe-Elisée Panneton
