= Three Rivers (Province of Canada electoral district) =

Electoral district in former Province of Canada

Coordinates: 46.3°N 72.6°W

Three Rivers Canada East
Province of Canada electoral district

Defunct pre-Confederation electoral district
- Legislature: Legislative Assembly of the Province of Canada
- District created: 1841
- District abolished: 1867
- First contested: 1841
- Last contested: 1865

Three Rivers (French name: Trois-Rivières) was an electoral district of the Legislative Assembly of the Parliament of the Province of Canada, in Canada East. It was centered on the town of Trois-Rivières (known at that time as "Three Rivers" in English). The district was created in 1841, based in part on the previous electoral district of the same name in the Parliament of Lower Canada.

Three Rivers electoral district was represented by one member in the Legislative Assembly. The district was abolished in 1867, upon the creation of Canada and the province of Quebec.

== Boundaries ==
Three Rivers electoral district was located on the north shore of the Saint Lawrence River, midway between Quebec City and Montreal. It was created in 1841, upon the establishment of the new Province of Canada. Although it was centered on the town of Trois-Rivières, in the same way as the predecessor electoral district of the same name for Lower Canada, its boundaries had been significantly altered by the Governor General, Lord Sydenham, to favour voters of British background over the francophone Canadiens. Sydenham wanted to ensure members were elected who would support the new union and his government and drew the boundaries with this goal. It was an example of a linguistic and ethnic gerrymander.

The Union Act, 1840 merged the two provinces of Upper Canada and Lower Canada into the Province of Canada, with a single Parliament. The separate parliaments of Lower Canada and Upper Canada were abolished. The Union Act provided that the pre-existing electoral boundaries of Lower Canada and Upper Canada would continue to be used in the new Parliament, unless altered by the Union Act itself.

Three Rivers was one of the electoral districts specifically defined in the Union Act. The Act provided that the town would continue as a separate electoral district, electing one member to the Legislative Assembly. However, instead of continuing the district under the previous boundaries, the Act gave the Governor General the power to draw new boundaries for the district. The Governor General exercised this power by a proclamation on March 4, 1841, only four days before the elections were to begin on March 8.

The boundaries set by the Proclamation were as follows:

The Town of Three Rivers, for the purposes aforesaid, shall be bounded and limited as follows, to wit:— shall comprehend all the tract or parcel of land, (being part and parcel of the aforesaid County of Saint Maurice,) bounded in front by the River St. Lawrence, and in rear by a line parallel to the general course of the said front, at a distance of one hundred and sixty chains from the westerly point of the mouth of the River Saint Maurice; on the easterly side by the said River Saint Maurice, and on the westerly side by a line rectangular to the aforesaid rear line, running from a point therein at the distance of one hundred and sixty chains from the westerly bank of the River Saint Maurice until it strikes the River St. Lawrence.

The effect of these boundaries was to contract the electoral district, excluding the outlying areas of the town, which had a largely French-speaking population, thus diluting the voting strength of the francophone voters.

== Members of the Legislative Assembly (1841–1867) ==
Three Rivers was a single-member constituency.

The following were the members of the Legislative Assembly for Three Rivers. The party affiliations are based on the biographies of individual members given by the National Assembly of Quebec, as well as votes in the Legislative Assembly. "Party" was a fluid concept, especially during the early years of the Province of Canada.

Parliament	Members	Years in Office	Party
1st Parliament; 1841–1844	Charles Richard Ogden	1841–1844	Unionist; "British" Tory
2nd Parliament; 1844–1847	Edward Greive (Note: Died in office, June 1845: Côté, Political Appointments and Elections, pp. 47, 60, note (83).)	1844–1845	Tory
2nd Parliament; 1844–1847	Denis-Benjamin Viger (Note: Elected in by-election, July 14, 1845: Côté, Political Appointments and Elections, pp. 47, 60, note (84).)	1845–1847 (by-election)	"British" Tory
3rd Parliament; 1848–1851 (Note: No member was returned in the general election; Antoine Polette was elected in a by-election, April 26, 1848: Côté, Political Appointments and Elections, pp. 51, 61, note (122).)	Antoine Polette	1848–1857	French-Canadian Group
4th Parliament; 1851–1854	Antoine Polette	1848–1857	Ministerialist, then temporary opposition moderate
5th Parliament; 1854–1857	Antoine Polette	1848–1857	Moderate, then Bleu
6th Parliament; 1858–1861	William McDonell Dawson	1858–1861	Conservative
7th Parliament; 1861–1863	Joseph-Édouard Turcotte	1861–1864	Bleu
8th Parliament; 1863–1867	Joseph-Édouard Turcotte (Note: Died in office, December 20, 1864: "Biography of Joseph-Édouard-Turcotte". Dictionnaire des parlementaires du Québec de 1792 à nos jours (in French). National Assembly of Quebec.)	1861–1864	Bleu
8th Parliament; 1863–1867	Louis-Charles Boucher de Niverville (Note: Elected in by-election, January 16, 1865: J.O. Côté, Political Appointments and Elections in the Province of Canada from 1841 to 1865, 2nd ed. (Ottawa: G.E. Desbarats, 1865), p. 117.)	1865–1867 (by-election)	Confederation; Bleu

== Abolition ==
The district was abolished on July 1, 1867, when the British North America Act, 1867 came into force, creating Canada and splitting the Province of Canada into Quebec and Ontario. It was succeeded by electoral districts of the same name in the House of Commons of Canada and the Legislative Assembly of Quebec.

== See also ==
- List of elections in the Province of Canada
