= Guy Bacon =

Canadian politician (1936–2018)

Guy Bacon (13 February 1936 – 24 December 2018) was a politician in Quebec, Canada. He was a Member of the National Assembly (MNA).

== Background ==
Bacon was born on 13 February 1936, in Trois-Rivières, and was the younger brother of Senator Lise Bacon. He died on 24 December 2018, aged 82.

== Political career ==
Bacon ran as a Liberal candidate in the district of Trois-Rivières in 1970, and won against Union Nationale incumbent Gilles Gauthier.

He became Parliamentary Assistant in 1973 and was re-elected in the same year. In 1976 though, he was defeated by Parti Québécois candidate Denis Vaugeois.

== Footnotes ==
National Assembly of Quebec
Preceded by Gilles Gauthier (Union Nationale)	MNA, District of Trois-Rivières; 1970–1976	Succeeded by Denis Vaugeois (PQ)
