= Trois-Rivières (provincial electoral district) =

Provincial electoral district in Quebec, Canada

Coordinates: 46.3°N 72.6°W

Quebec electoral district

Provincial electoral district
- Legislature: National Assembly of Quebec
MNA
Jean Pellerin
Parti Québécois
- District created: 1867
- First contested: 1867
- Last contested: 2026

Demographics
- Electors (2012): 43,252
- Area (km²): 62.4
- Census division: Francheville (part)
- Census subdivision: Trois-Rivières (part)

Trois-Rivières (French: [tʁwɑ ʁivjɛʁ], Canadian French: [tʁwɔ ʁivjaɛ̯ʁ]) is a provincial electoral district in the Mauricie region of Quebec, Canada, that elects members to the National Assembly of Quebec. It includes part of the city of Trois-Rivières, including most of the territory of the city as it existed prior to its 2002 amalgamation and expansion.

It was created for the 1867 election, and an electoral district of that name existed even earlier: see Trois-Rivières (Lower Canada) and Trois-Rivières (Province of Canada electoral district).

In the change from the 2001 to the 2011 electoral map, its border with the Maskinongé electoral district was adjusted, resulting in simultaneously gaining and losing different parts of the city of Trois-Rivières.

== Members of the Legislative Assembly / National Assembly ==
Legislature	Years	Member	Party
1st	1867–1868	Louis-Charles Boucher de Niverville	Conservative
1st	1868–1869	Sévère Dumoulin	Conservative
1st	1869–1871	Charles-Borromée Genest	Conservative
2nd	1871–1874	Henri-Gédéon Malhiot	Conservative
2nd	1874–1875	Henri-Gédéon Malhiot	Conservative
3rd	1875–1876	Henri-Gédéon Malhiot	Conservative
3rd	1876–1878	Arthur Turcotte	Independent
4th	1878–1881	Arthur Turcotte	Independent
5th	1881–1883	Sévère Dumoulin	Conservative
5th	1884–1886	Arthur Turcotte	Independent
6th	1886–1888	Arthur Turcotte	Liberal
6th	1888–1890	Arthur Turcotte	Liberal
7th	1890–1892	Télesphore-Eusèbe Normand	Conservative
8th	1892–1892	Télesphore-Eusèbe Normand	Conservative
8th	1892–1897	Télesphore-Eusèbe Normand	Conservative
9th	1897–1900	Télesphore-Eusèbe Normand	Conservative
10th	1900–1904	Richard-Stanislas Cooke	Liberal
11th	1904–1908	Joseph-Adolphe Tessier	Liberal
12th	1908–1912	Joseph-Adolphe Tessier	Liberal
13th	1912–1914	Joseph-Adolphe Tessier	Liberal
13th	1914–1916	Joseph-Adolphe Tessier	Liberal
14th	1916–1919	Joseph-Adolphe Tessier	Liberal
15th	1919–1921	Joseph-Adolphe Tessier	Liberal
15th	1919–1923	Louis-Philippe Mercier	Liberal
16th	1923–1927	Louis-Philippe Mercier	Liberal
17th	1927–1931	Maurice Duplessis	Conservative
18th	1931–1935	Maurice Duplessis	Conservative
19th	1935–1936	Maurice Duplessis	Conservative
20th	1936–1939	Maurice Duplessis	Union Nationale
21st	1939–1944	Maurice Duplessis	Union Nationale
22nd	1944–1948	Maurice Duplessis	Union Nationale
23rd	1948–1952	Maurice Duplessis	Union Nationale
24th	1952–1956	Maurice Duplessis	Union Nationale
25th	1956–1959†	Maurice Duplessis	Union Nationale
26th	1960–1962	Yves Gabias	Union Nationale
27th	1962–1966	Yves Gabias	Union Nationale
28th	1966–1969	Yves Gabias	Union Nationale
28th	1969–1970	Gilles Gauthier	Union Nationale
29th	1970–1973	Guy Bacon	Liberal
30th	1973–1976	Guy Bacon	Liberal
31st	1976–1981	Denis Vaugeois	Parti Québécois
32nd	1981–1985	Denis Vaugeois	Parti Québécois
32nd	1985–1985	Paul Philibert	Liberal
33rd	1985–1989	Paul Philibert	Liberal
34th	1989–1994	Paul Philibert	Liberal
35th	1994–1998	Guy Julien	Parti Québécois
36th	1998–2003	Guy Julien	Parti Québécois
37th	2003–2007	André Gabias	Liberal
38th	2007–2008	Sébastien Proulx	Action démocratique
39th	2008–2012	Danielle St-Amand	Liberal
40th	2012–2014	Danielle St-Amand	Liberal
41st	2014–2018	Jean-Denis Girard	Liberal
42nd	2018–2022	Jean Boulet	Coalition Avenir Québec
43rd	2022–2026	Jean Boulet	Coalition Avenir Québec
44th	2026–Present	Jean Pellerin	Parti Québécois

== Election results ==
Template:2026 Quebec general election/Trois-Rivières

2022 Quebec general election
Party	Candidate	Votes	%	±%
Coalition Avenir Québec	Jean Boulet	18,859	50.81	+9.74
Québec solidaire	Steven Roy Cullen	6,069	16.35	-0.83
Parti Québécois	Laurent Vézina	5,323	14.34	-1.09
Conservative	Karine Pépin	4,552	12.26	+10.55
Liberal	Adams Tekougoum	2,056	5.54	-17.3
Climat Québec	Éric Trottier	148	0.40	–
L'Union fait la force	Georges Samman	108	0.29	–
Total valid votes		37,115	98.69	
Total rejected ballots		492	1.31	
Turnout		37,607	68.72	
Electors on the lists		54,728		

2018 Quebec general election
Party	Candidate	Votes	%	±%
Coalition Avenir Québec	Jean Boulet	15,323	41.07	+18.79
Liberal	Jean-Denis Girard	8,522	22.84	-16.32
Québec solidaire	Valérie Delage	6,411	17.18	+8.68
Parti Québécois	Marie-Claude Camirand	5,758	15.43	-12.96
Green	Adis Simidzija	653	1.75	
Conservative	Daniel Hénault	639	1.71	+0.84
Total valid votes		37,306	98.04	
Total rejected ballots		744	1.96	
Turnout		38,050	70.22	
Eligible voters		54,187		
Coalition Avenir Québec gain from Liberal		Swing		+17.56
Source(s) "Rapport des résultats officiels du scrutin". Élections Québec.

2014 Quebec general election
Party	Candidate	Votes	%
Liberal	Jean-Denis Girard	11,658	39.16
Parti Québécois	Alexis Deschênes	8,452	28.39
Coalition Avenir Québec	Diego Brunelle	6,634	22.28
Québec solidaire	Jean-Claude Landry	2,531	8.50
Conservative	Pierre-Louis Bonneau	260	0.87
Option nationale	André de Repentigny	238	0.80
Total valid votes		29,773	98.05
Total rejected ballots		593	1.95
Turnout		30,366	69.00
Electors on the lists		43,721	–

2012 Quebec general election
Party	Candidate	Votes	%	±%
Liberal	Danielle St-Amand	11,255	35.15	-5.28
Parti Québécois	Djemila Benhabib	10,254	32.02	-3.77
Coalition Avenir Québec	Andrew D'Amours	7,447	23.26	+4.64
Québec solidaire	Jean-Claude Landry	1,615	5.04	+1.95
Option nationale	Charles-Hugo Normand	1,121	3.50	–
Independent	Robert Deschamps	217	0.68	–
Équipe Autonomiste	Kathie McNicoll	110	0.34	–
Total valid votes		32,019	98.36	–
Total rejected ballots		534	1.64	–
Turnout		32,553	75.22	
Electors on the lists		43,279	–	–
Liberal hold		Swing		-0.75

^ Change is from redistributed results. CAQ change is from ADQ.

2008 Quebec general election
Party	Candidate	Votes	%	±%
Liberal	Danielle St-Amand	9,129	40.10	+11.56
Parti Québécois	Yves St-Pierre	8,169	35.88	+8.03
Action démocratique	Sébastien Proulx	4,241	18.63	-18.57
Québec solidaire	Alex Noel	714	3.14	-0.15
Green	Louis Lacroix	515	2.26	-0.42
Total valid votes		22,768	98.56	–
Total rejected ballots		333	1.44	–
Turnout		23,101	60.46	–
Electors on the lists		38,209	–	–

2007 Quebec general election
Party	Candidate	Votes	%
Action démocratique	Sébastien Proulx	10,247	37.20
Liberal	André Gabias	7,862	28.54
Parti Québécois	Jean-Pierre Adam	7,672	27.85
Québec solidaire	André Lemay	907	3.29
Green	Louis Lacroix	739	2.68
Independent	Stéphan Vincent	121	0.44
Total valid votes		27,548	98.94
Total rejected ballots		295	1.06
Turnout		27,843	73.49
Electors on the lists		37,887	–

2003 Quebec general election
Party	Candidate	Votes	%
Liberal	André Gabias	11,034	40.80
Parti Québécois	Guy Julien	10,154	37.55
Action démocratique	Jean-Claude Ayotte	5,181	19.16
Bloc Pot	Rachel Sauvageau	274	1.01
UFP	David Lanneville	214	0.79
Independent	Marcel Fugère	110	0.41
Christian Democracy	Stéphan Robert	76	0.28
Total valid votes		27,043	98.73
Total rejected ballots		347	1.27
Turnout		27,390	72.51
Electors on the lists		37,775	–

1998 Quebec general election
Party	Candidate	Votes	%
Parti Québécois	Guy Julien	13,495	46.31
Liberal	Guy Leblanc	11,972	41.09
Action démocratique	Lucille Francoeur	3,477	11.93
Natural Law	Gilles Raymond	113	0.39
Independent (RAP)	Serge Simard	82	0.28
Total valid votes		29,139	98.41
Total rejected ballots		471	1.59
Turnout		29,610	78.91
Electors on the lists		37,526	–

1995 Quebec referendum
Side	Votes	%
Oui	19,328	55.64
Non	15,411	44.36

1994 Quebec general election
Party	Candidate	Votes	%
Parti Québécois	Guy Julien	12,607	43.24
Liberal	Paul Philibert	11,998	41.16
Action démocratique	Luc Bouthillier	4,267	14.64
Natural Law	Roger Périgny	281	0.96
Total valid votes		29,153	97.76
Total rejected ballots		667	2.24
Turnout		29,820	81.94
Electors on the lists		36,391	–

1992 Charlottetown Accord referendum
Side	Votes	%
Non	18,841	60.58
Oui	12,262	39.42

1989 Quebec general election
Party	Candidate	Votes	%
Liberal	Paul Philibert	15,181	54.53
Parti Québécois	Rollande Cloutier	11,619	41.73
New Democratic	Donald Molnar	413	1.48
Independent	Roger Livernoche	412	1.48
Marxist–Leninist	Lise Ethier	216	0.96
Total valid votes		27,841	97.10
Total rejected ballots		831	2.90
Turnout		28,672	75.50
Electors on the lists		37,975	–

1985 Quebec general election
Party	Candidate	Votes	%
Liberal	Paul Philibert	17,258	59.18
Parti Québécois	Rollande Cloutier	10,893	37.35
New Democratic	Jocelyn Ann Leblanc-Girard	614	2.10
Socialist Movement	Roger Deslauriers	315	1.08
Communist	Paul Gagné	84	0.29
Total valid votes		29,164	98.52
Total rejected ballots		439	1.48
Turnout		29,603	74.82
Electors on the lists		39,564	–

Quebec provincial by-election, 1985
Party	Candidate	Votes	%
Liberal	Paul Philibert	14,347	67.09
Parti Québécois	Jacques Lessard	3,530	16.51
Union Nationale	Jean-Marc Béliveau	3,357	15.70
Republic of Canada	Aurore Lamer	152	0.71
Total valid votes		21,386	97.84
Total rejected ballots		472	2.16
Turnout		21,858	55.50
Electors on the lists		39,381	–

1981 Quebec general election
Party	Candidate	Votes	%
Parti Québécois	Denis Vaugeois	16,070	51.32
Liberal	Paul Philibert	14,120	45.09
Union Nationale	Jules Francoeur	926	2.96
Independent	Marcel Levasseur	83	0.27
Workers Communist	Pirette Deschênes	72	0.23
Marxist–Leninist	Lise Ethier	41	0.13
Total valid votes		31,312	98.87
Total rejected ballots		357	1.13
Turnout		31,669	81.51
Electors on the lists		38,855	–

1980 Quebec referendum
Side	Votes	%
Non	18,736	59.05
Oui	12,995	40.95

1976 Quebec general election
Party	Candidate	Votes	%
Parti Québécois	Denis Vaugeois	13,821	43.80
Liberal	Guy Bacon	10,639	33.71
Union Nationale	Jacques Trahan	5,662	17.94
Ralliement créditiste	Gaétan Laflèche	1,437	4.55
Total valid votes		31,559	98.06
Total rejected ballots		625	1.94
Turnout		32,184	85.26
Electors on the lists		37,750	–

1973 Quebec general election
Party	Candidate	Votes	%
Liberal	Guy Bacon	16,714	57.57
Parti Québécois	Claude Lajeunesse	8,707	29.99
Parti créditiste	Jacques Vachon	1,865	6.42
Union Nationale	Jean Gauthier	1,746	6.02
Total valid votes		29,032	97.96
Total rejected ballots		606	2.04
Turnout		29,638	78.80
Electors on the lists		37,612	–

1970 Quebec general election
Party	Candidate	Votes	%
Liberal	Guy Bacon	12,899	39.84
Union Nationale	Gilles Gauthier	8,706	26.89
Parti Québécois	Charles Saint-Arnaud	6,995	21.60
Ralliement créditiste	Roger Simard	3,778	11.67
Total valid votes		32,378	98.39
Total rejected ballots		531	1.61
Turnout		32,909	81.15
Electors on the lists		40,554	–

Quebec provincial by-election, 1969
Party	Candidate	Votes	%
Union Nationale	Gilles Gauthier	11,003	53.38
Ralliement créditiste	Roger Simard	5,208	25.27
Independent Crédit social uni	Jacques Vachon	2,983	14.47
Independent	Aimé Lefrançois	1,417	6.87
Total valid votes		20,611	94.71
Total rejected ballots		1,151	5.29
Turnout		21,762	57.03
Electors on the lists		38,158	–

1966 Quebec general election
Party	Candidate	Votes	%
Union Nationale	Yves Gabias	15,362	48.97
Liberal	Léon Balcer	14,317	45.64
RIN	Fernand Villemure	1,692	5.39
Total valid votes		31,371	98.55
Total rejected ballots		461	1.45
Turnout		31,832	82.88
Electors on the lists		38,408	–

1962 Quebec general election
Party	Candidate	Votes	%
Union Nationale	Yves Gabias	15,323	51.75
Liberal	Fernand Duchaine	14,287	48.25
Total valid votes		29,610	99.00
Total rejected ballots		299	1.00
Turnout		29,909	89.96
Electors on the lists		33,247	–

1960 Quebec general election
Party	Candidate	Votes	%
Union Nationale	Yves Gabias	13,221	46.65
Liberal	Fernand Duchaine	13,118	46.29
Independent	J.-Cyprien Sawyer	1,856	6.55
Capital familial	Henri-Georges Grenier	144	0.51
Total valid votes		28,339	100.00
Turnout		28,339	89.22
Electors on the lists		31,763	–

1956 Quebec general election
Party	Candidate	Votes	%
Union Nationale	Maurice Duplessis	16,263	61.73
Liberal	Lorne Berlinguet	9,936	37.72
Capital familial	Henri-Georges Grenier	93	0.35
Labor-Progressive	Wilfrid-Édouard Terreault	52	0.20
Total valid votes		26,344	98.77
Total rejected ballots		328	1.23
Turnout		26,672	88.23
Electors on the lists		30,230	–

1952 Quebec general election
Party	Candidate	Votes	%
Union Nationale	Maurice Duplessis	15,493	60.64
Liberal	Joseph-Alfred Mongrain	10,058	39.36
Total valid votes		25,551	99.28
Total rejected ballots		185	0.72
Turnout		25,736	90.65
Electors on the lists		28,392	–

1948 Quebec general election
Party	Candidate	Votes	%
Union Nationale	Maurice Duplessis	16,097	76.91
Liberal	Alexandre-Marcel Lajoie	3,836	18.33
Union des électeurs	Paul-Henri Poliquin	997	4.76
Total valid votes		20,930	98.81
Total rejected ballots		253	1.19
Turnout		21,183	81.12
Electors on the lists		26,114	–

1944 Quebec general election
Party	Candidate	Votes	%
Union Nationale	Maurice Duplessis	12,576	66.74
Liberal	Léopold Pinsonnault	5,318	28.22
Bloc populaire	Lucien Richard	950	5.04
Total valid votes		18,844	98.90
Total rejected ballots		209	1.10
Turnout		19,053	80.41
Electors on the lists		23,695	–

1939 Quebec general election
Party	Candidate	Votes	%
Union Nationale	Maurice Duplessis	5,278	59.69
Liberal	Atchez Pitt	3,565	40.31
Total valid votes		8,843	98.47
Total rejected ballots		137	1.53
Turnout		8,980	87.91
Electors on the lists		10,215	–

1936 Quebec general election
Party	Candidate	Votes	%
Union Nationale	Maurice Duplessis	5,628	69.31
Liberal	Philippe Bigué	2,492	30.69
Total valid votes		8,120	99.12
Total rejected ballots		72	0.88
Turnout		8,192	83.13
Electors on the lists		9,855	–

1935 Quebec general election
Party	Candidate	Votes	%
Conservative	Maurice Duplessis	4,873	57.03
Liberal	Léon Lajoie	3,671	42.97
Total valid votes		8,544	99.62
Total rejected ballots		33	0.38
Turnout		8,577	86.70
Electors on the lists		9,893	–

1931 Quebec general election
Party	Candidate	Votes	%
Conservative	Maurice Duplessis	3,812	50.27
Liberal	Philippe Bigué	3,771	49.73
Total valid votes		7,583	99.63
Total rejected ballots		28	0.37
Turnout		7,611	82.96
Electors on the lists		9,174	–

1927 Quebec general election
Party	Candidate	Votes	%
Conservative	Maurice Duplessis	2,622	51.23
Liberal	Louis-Philippe Mercier	2,496	48.77
Total valid votes		5,118	98.99
Total rejected ballots		52	1.01
Turnout		5,170	72.28
Electors on the lists		7,153	–

1923 Quebec general election
Party	Candidate	Votes	%
Liberal	Louis-Philippe Mercier	1,612	54.83
Conservative	Maurice Duplessis	1,328	45.17
Total valid votes		2,940	98.29
Total rejected ballots		51	1.71
Turnout		2,991	59.94
Electors on the lists		4,990	–

Quebec provincial by-election, 1921
Party	Candidate	Votes
Liberal	Louis-Philippe Mercier	Acclaimed

1919 Quebec general election
Party	Candidate	Votes
Liberal	Joseph-Adolphe Tessier	Acclaimed
Electors on the lists		4,300

1916 Quebec general election
Party	Candidate	Votes	%
Liberal	Joseph-Adolphe Tessier	2,101	65.53
Conservative	Napoléon Lamy	1,105	34.47
Total valid votes		3,206	98.83
Total rejected ballots		38	1.17
Turnout		3,244	70.17
Electors on the lists		4,623	–

Quebec provincial by-election, 1914
Party	Candidate	Votes	%
Liberal	Joseph-Adolphe Tessier	1,792	54.17
Conservative	Joseph-Alfred Désy	1,516	45.83
Total valid votes		3,308	99.19
Total rejected ballots		27	0.81
Turnout		3,335	84.58
Electors on the lists		3,943	–

1912 Quebec general election
Party	Candidate	Votes	%
Liberal	Joseph-Adolphe Tessier	1,360	56.13
Conservative	Pierre-Narcisse Martel	1,063	43.87
Total valid votes		2,423	98.78
Total rejected ballots		30	1.22
Turnout		2,453	80.61
Electors on the lists		3,043	–

1908 Quebec general election
Party	Candidate	Votes	%
Liberal	Joseph-Adolphe Tessier	1,135	57.12
Conservative	Pierre-Narcisse Martel	852	42.88
Total valid votes		1,987	98.90
Total rejected ballots		22	1.10
Turnout		2,009	81.50
Electors on the lists		2,465	–

1904 Quebec general election
Party	Candidate	Votes
Liberal	Joseph-Adolphe Tessier	Acclaimed
Electors on the lists		2,000

1900 Quebec general election
Party	Candidate	Votes
Liberal	Richard-Stanislas Cooke	Acclaimed
Electors on the lists		1,623

1897 Quebec general election
Party	Candidate	Votes	%
Conservative	Télesphore-Eusèbe Normand	737	58.96
Liberal	John Ryan	513	41.04
Total valid votes		1,250	99.29
Total rejected ballots		9	0.71
Turnout		1,259	80.50
Electors on the lists		1,564	–

Quebec provincial by-election, 1892
Party	Candidate	Votes	%
Conservative	Télesphore-Eusèbe Normand	556	50.82
Liberal	Richard-Stanislas Cooke	538	49.18
Total valid votes		1,094	99.27
Total rejected ballots		8	0.73
Turnout		1,102	81.81
Electors on the lists		1,347	–

1892 Quebec general election
Party	Candidate	Votes	%
Conservative	Télesphore-Eusèbe Normand	566	50.13
Liberal	Richard-Stanislas Cooke	563	49.87
Total valid votes		1,129	99.38
Total rejected ballots		7	0.62
Turnout		1,136	81.81
Electors on the lists		1,382	–

1890 Quebec general election
Party	Candidate	Votes	%
Conservative	Télesphore-Eusèbe Normand	627	51.78
Liberal	Arthur Turcotte	584	48.22
Total valid votes		1,211	98.54
Total rejected ballots		18	1.46
Turnout		1,229	86.06
Electors on the lists		1,428	–

Quebec provincial by-election, 1888
Party	Candidate	Votes	%
Liberal	Arthur Turcotte	607	59.34
Conservative	Arthur Olivier	416	40.66
Total valid votes		1,023	99.82
Total rejected ballots		8	0.78
Turnout		1,031	83.41
Electors on the lists		1,236	–

1886 Quebec general election
Party	Candidate	Votes	%
Liberal	Arthur Turcotte	493	50.72
Conservative	Arthur Olivier	479	49.28
Total valid votes		972	98.08
Total rejected ballots		19	1.92
Turnout		991	82.04
Electors on the lists		1,208	–

Quebec provincial by-election, 1884
Party	Candidate	Votes	%
Independent Conservative	Arthur Turcotte	509	61.03
Conservative	Sévère Dumoulin	325	38.97
Total valid votes		834	100.00
Turnout		834	72.65
Electors on the lists		1,148	–

1881 Quebec general election
Party	Candidate	Votes	%
Conservative	Sévère Dumoulin	452	52.99
Independent Conservative	Arthur Turcotte	401	47.01
Total valid votes		853	98.39
Total rejected ballots		14	1.61
Turnout		867	79.76
Electors on the lists		1,087	–

1878 Quebec general election
Party	Candidate	Votes
Independent Conservative	Arthur Turcotte	Acclaimed
Electors on the lists		1,549

Quebec provincial by-election, 1876
Party	Candidate	Votes	%
Independent Conservative	Arthur Turcotte	632	48.22
Conservative	Télesphore-Eusèbe Normand	428	51.78
Total valid votes		1,060	100.00
Turnout		1,060	71.52
Electors on the lists		1,482	–

1875 Quebec general election
Party	Candidate	Votes	%
Conservative	Henri-Gédéon Malhiot	621	55.05
Liberal	Georges A. Gouin	507	44.95
Total valid votes		1,128	98.86
Total rejected ballots		13	1.14
Turnout		1,141	80.64
Electors on the lists		1,415	–

Quebec provincial by-election, 1874
Party	Candidate	Votes
Conservative	Henri-Gédéon Malhiot	Acclaimed

1875 Quebec general election
Party	Candidate	Votes	%
Conservative	Henri-Gédéon Malhiot	333	57.91
Conservative	Charles-Borromée Genest	242	42.09
Total valid votes		575	100.00
Turnout		575	72.97
Electors on the lists		788	–

Quebec provincial by-election, 1869
Party	Candidate	Votes	%
Conservative	Charles-Borromée Genest	254	55.58
Conservative	Henri-Gédéon Malhiot	203	44.42
Total valid votes		457	100.00
Turnout		457	67.40
Electors on the lists		678	–

Quebec provincial by-election, 1868
Party	Candidate	Votes
Conservative	Sévère Dumoulin	Acclaimed

1867 Quebec general election
Party	Candidate	Votes	%
Conservative	Louis-Charles Boucher de Niverville	233	55.08
Conservative	Sévère Dumoulin	242	44.92
Total valid votes		423	100.00
Turnout		423	74.60
Electors on the lists		567	–

== See also ==
- Three Rivers (Province of Canada electoral district)
- Trois-Rivières (Lower Canada electoral district)
- List of Quebec provincial electoral districts
- Canadian provincial electoral districts
