= Anaïs Allard-Rousseau =

Canadian educator and social activist

Anaïs Allard-Rousseau (née Allard; October 31, 1904 – February 15, 1971) was a Canadian educator and social activist who lived in Quebec.

== Biography ==
Anaïs Allard was born in Sainte-Monique de Nicolet. She was the sister of Jean Victor Allard. She studied music, education, philosophy and botany. In 1926, she married Arthur Rousseau, mayor of Trois-Rivières, and settled in Trois-Rivières. In 1942, she founded Les Rendez-vous artistiques, a concert society, and established the Club André-Mathieu, a series of concerts for young people. In 1949, she helped found the Jeunesses musicales du Canada (JMC); she served as its president from 1954 to 1956 and was delegate for the JMC to various international conventions. From 1952 to 1955, she was vice-president of the international federation of the Jeunesses Musicales. She taught courses in music and fine arts at the École normale du Christ-Roi, the Centre d'études universitaires and the École normale Maurice-Duplessis in Trois-Rivières. She also helped found the Conservatoire de Trois Rivières.

== Death and legacy ==
Allard-Rousseau died in Fort-de-France, Martinique at the age of 66.

The concert hall of the Centre culturel for Trois-Rivières was named in her honour.

== Awards and honours ==
In 1969, she was named an officer in the Order of Canada.
