= Jean Pellerin =

Quebec politician

Jean Pellerin MNA

Member of the National Assembly for Trois-Rivières
- Incumbent
- Assumed office October 5, 2026
- Preceded by: Jean Boulet

Personal details
- Party: Parti Québécois
- Education: University of Quebec at Trois-Rivières

Jean Pellerin is a Quebec politician who was the elected to the National Assembly of Quebec for Trois-Rivières in the 2026 Quebec general election as a member of the Parti Québécois, defeating Premier Christine Frechette. He is a graduate of the University of Quebec at Trois-Rivières with a bachelor's degree in administration.

Pellerin was appointed Minister of the Environment, the Fight Against Climate Change, Wildlife and Parks in 2026.
