= William McDougall (Quebec politician) =

Canadian politician

William McDougall, QC (1831 – March 3, 1886) was a lawyer, judge and political figure in Quebec, Canada. He represented Three Rivers in the House of Commons of Canada from 1868 to 1878 as a Conservative member.

He was born in Scotland in 1831, the son of John McDougall, and came to Lower Canada with his family while still young. He studied law and was called to the bar in 1851. McDougall was elected to the federal parliament by acclamation in an 1868 by-election after the sitting member resigned. In 1873, he became a Queen's Counsel. He was a director of the Phillipsburgh, Farnham and Yamaska Railway. He resigned his seat in 1878 to allow Hector-Louis Langevin to have a seat in the House of Commons.

In 1880, he was named to the Quebec Superior Court for Ottawa district. He died in Aylmer in 1886.

His daughter Alice married James Klock who also later served in the House of Commons.

Parliament of Canada
Preceded by Louis-Charles Boucher de Niverville (Conservative)	Member of Parliament from Three Rivers; 1868–1878	Succeeded by Hector Langevin (Conservative)
