= Arthur Rousseau =

Canadian politician (1900–1994)

Arthur Rousseau (February 4, 1900 – October 30, 1994) was a Canadian politician and a former Mayor of Trois-Rivières.

== Background ==
In 1926, he married Anaïs Allard-Rousseau, co-founder of the Jeunesses Musicales du Canada. They had seven children. In 1927, he opened a funeral home.

== Achievements ==
In 1946, he endowed Trois-Rivières its first public library.

== Footnotes ==
Political offices
Preceded by Atchez Pitt	Mayor of Trois-Rivières; 1941–1949	Succeeded by Joseph-Alfred Mongrain
