= Jean-François Aubin =

Canadian politician

His Worship Jean-François Aubin

Mayor of Trois-Rivières
- Incumbent
- Assumed office November 13, 2025
- Preceded by: Jean Lamarche

Jean-François Aubin is a Canadian politician who has served as the mayor of Trois-Rivières, Quebec, since 2025. He is an independent.
