= Parti bleu =

Pre-Confederation political party in Canada

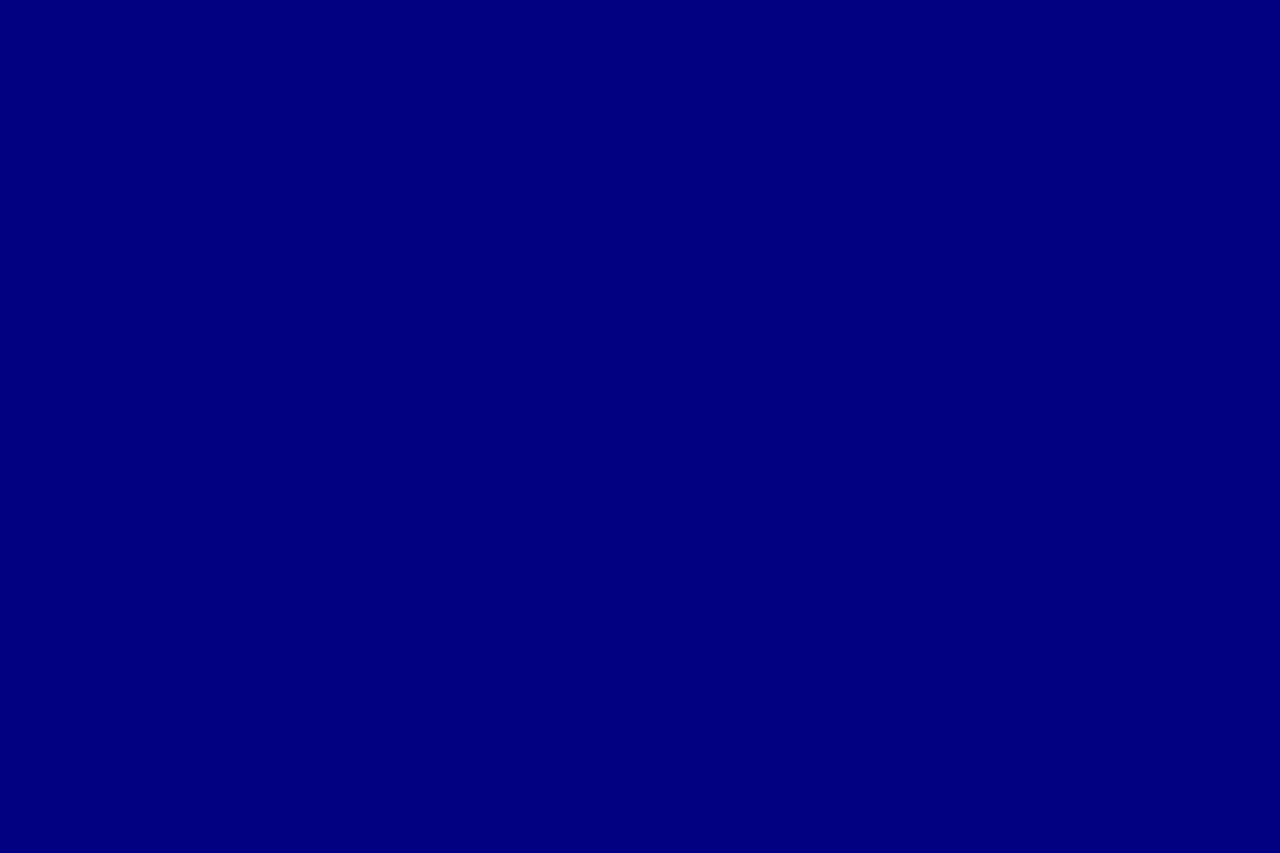
- Founded: 1854
- Dissolved: 1867
- Preceded by: Reform Movement (Upper Canada)
- Succeeded by: Conservative Party of Quebec, Liberal-Conservative Party
- Headquarters: Montreal, Canada East
- Ideology: Conservatism; Quebec nationalism Ultramontanism
- Political position: Right-wing
- Colours: Blue

The Parti bleu (French pronunciation: [paʁti blø], "Blue Party") was a political group that contested elections in the Eastern section of the Province of Canada. The Blue Party was ideologically located on the political right; it was also defined by its support for the Catholic Church, and later for supporting confederation.

The party was formed in 1854 by conservative members of the former Reform movement, following in the tradition of Louis-Hippolyte Lafontaine and Francis Hincks. The first leader of the Blue Party, George-Étienne Cartier, was the Premier of Canada East. The Parti bleu held majorities in Canada East uninterrupted from 1854 to 1867; the party often formed coalition governments with the English-speaking Conservatives from Canada East, and the Liberal-Conservative Party from Canada West. Their main electoral challenge came from the Parti rouge, a secularist left-wing party. After confederation in 1867, the party was dissolved; members became part of the Conservative Party of Quebec at the provincial level, and the Conservative Party of Canada federally.

== History ==
The Reform Party was a broad movement, organized around achieving responsible government in the Province of Canada. Because responsible government was required to enact any form of self-government, it was supported by both liberals and conservatives who could not achieve their own policy aims without it. The Reform Party was thus able to draw in members from across the ideological spectrum. After 1848, when responsible government was introduced by the Imperial Government, the unifying policy of the movement had been achieved and the movement began to break down. By 1853, the government was unable to secure majorities on core legislation. By the time of election in 1854, the party had broken down into factions based on their ideological positions. The French-Canadian conservatives initially called themselves Ministerialists, in recognition of their support of the government and opposition of the Rouges and Liberals. By 1856, the Ministerialist faction had changed their name to Bleu.

The Ministerialists experienced electoral success in the Canadian general election, 1854. They won 35 seats in Canada East, forming the largest group out of the Eastern members. Their strong electoral performance allowed them to form a coalition government with the Canada West Conservatives led by Allan MacNab. Sir Étienne-Paschal Taché was the first leader of the Ministerialist group, but was replaced by George-Étienne Cartier as the Blue Party was formed. The coalition between the Canada West Conservatives and Blue Party began the Liberal-Conservative tradition of government in the province.

After the 1858 election, the Blue Party and Eastern-Canadian Conservatives became the largest group in the Legislative Assembly; they formed a coalition government with the Canada West Conservatives as the larger partner. Canada West had returned a majority of Liberal members, but the large majority commanded by the Blue Party and Conservatives in Canada East prevented the Liberals from taking power. The number of factions in the legislature made it difficult to secure majorities on government legislation, forcing the Blue-Conservative coalition out for a four-day period in 1858 after losing a non-confidence vote. However, the new Liberal-Rouge government was unable to secure a majority in the Legislative Assembly, and the Blue Party reformed a ministry with the Conservatives.

== Ideology ==
The Blue Party was ideologically moderate, established from the former reformers in Canada East. The party supported Confederation, the role of the Catholic Church in Canadian society, and the dismantling of the seigneurial system. The Blue Party was opposed to the anti-clerical and republican positions of the Parti rouge.

== Leaders ==
| Picture | Name | Term start | Term end | Notes |
|---|---|---|---|---|
| | Sir Étienne-Paschal Taché | 27 January 1855 | 26 November 1857 | Used the "Ministerialist" party label during first term |
| | Sir George-Étienne Cartier | 26 November 1857 | 24 May 1864 | First leader using the "Bleu" party label |
| | Sir Étienne-Paschal Taché | 30 May 1864 | 30 July 1865 | Senior statesman to lead the Great Coalition government; died in office |
| | Sir Narcisse-Fortunat Belleau | 30 July 1865 | 30 June 1867 | Appointed Lieutenant Governor of Quebec after Confederation |

== See also ==
- List of political parties in Canada
- Clerico-nationalism
