= Executive Council of Quebec =

Seat of executive power in Quebec, Canada

- Conseil exécutif du Québec
- Coat of arms of Quebec
- Nickname: Cabinet of Quebec (French: Conseil des ministres du Québec)
- Formation: July 1, 1867; 159 years ago
- Headquarters: Quebec City, Quebec
- Members: Lieutenant Governor of Quebec; Premier of Quebec; ministers of the Crown
- Crown: Charles III represented by Manon Jeannotte, Lieutenant Governor
- Chair: Paul St-Pierre Plamondon, Premier
- Staff: Government of Quebec
- Website: www.quebec.ca/en/premier/team/members-of-cabinet

The Executive Council of Quebec (French: Conseil exécutif du Québec, pronounced [kɔ̃sɛj ɛɡzekytif dy kebɛk]) is the cabinet of the Government of Quebec. It comprises ministers of the provincial Crown, who are selected by the premier of Quebec and appointed by the lieutenant governor.

== Composition ==
Typically made up of members of the National Assembly of Quebec, the provincial Executive Council is similar in structure and role to the federal Cabinet of Canada. The lieutenant governor, as representative of the Crown in Right of Quebec, heads the council, and is referred to as the Governor-in-Council. Other members of the cabinet are selected by the premier, and appointed by the lieutenant governor. Most members are the head of a ministry, but this is not always the case.

== Current Cabinet ==
The current cabinet is formed by members of the Parti Québecois under leader Paul St-Pierre Plamondon since 2026.
