= List of MPs who stood down at the 2015 Canadian federal election =

61 MPs chose to not seek reelection at the 2015 Canadian federal election, meaning they were Members of Parliament (MPs) in the 41st Parliament of Canada, but chose not to stand for election to the 42nd Parliament of Canada (in some cases after being deselected by their parties).

== Retired from office ==
Province	Electoral district	Outgoing incumbent (at 2011 and at dissolution)	Succeeded by
Alberta	Calgary—Nose Hill	Diane Ablonczy	Michelle Rempel
Alberta	Calgary West (Note: now called Calgary Signal Hill)	Rob Anders	Ron Liepert
Alberta	Edmonton Centre	Laurie Hawn	Randy Boissonnault
Alberta	Edmonton East (Note: now called Edmonton Griesbach)	Peter Goldring	Kerry Diotte
Alberta	Edmonton—Leduc (Note: now called Edmonton Riverbend)	James Rajotte	Matt Jeneroux
Alberta	Medicine Hat (Note: now called Medicine Hat—Cardston—Warner)	LaVar Payne	Jim Hillyer
Alberta	Vegreville—Wainwright (Note: merged to form Lakeland)	Leon Benoit	Shannon Stubbs
Alberta	Westlock—St. Paul	Brian Storseth	Shannon Stubbs
British Columbia	British Columbia Southern Interior (Note: now called South Okanagan—West Kootenay)	Alex Atamanenko	Richard Cannings
British Columbia	Cariboo—Prince George	Dick Harris	Todd Doherty
British Columbia	Nanaimo—Alberni (Note: now called Courtenay—Alberni)	James Lunney	Gord Johns
British Columbia	Nanaimo—Cowichan (Note: now called Cowichan—Malahat—Langford)	Jean Crowder	Alistair MacGregor
British Columbia	Okanagan—Shuswap (Note: now called North Okanagan—Shuswap)	Colin Mayes	Mel Arnold
British Columbia	Pitt Meadows—Maple Ridge—Mission (Note: now called Pitt Meadows—Maple Ridge)	Randy Kamp	Dan Ruimy
British Columbia	Port Moody—Westwood—Port Coquitlam (Note: now called Coquitlam—Port Coquitlam)	James Moore	Ron McKinnon
British Columbia	South Surrey—White Rock—Cloverdale (Note: now called South Surrey—White Rock)	Russ Hiebert	Dianne Watts
British Columbia	Vancouver East	Libby Davies	Jenny Kwan
Manitoba	Kildonan—St. Paul	Joy Smith	MaryAnn Mihychuk
Manitoba	Saint Boniface (Note: now called Saint Boniface—Saint Vital)	Shelly Glover	Dan Vandal
Manitoba	Winnipeg South	Rod Bruinooge	Terry Duguid
New Brunswick	Acadie—Bathurst	Yvon Godin	Serge Cormier
New Brunswick	Tobique—Mactaquac	Mike Allen	T. J. Harvey
Newfoundland and Labrador	Humber—St. Barbe—Baie Verte (Note: now called Long Range Mountains)	Gerry Byrne	Gudie Hutchings
Nova Scotia	Central Nova	Peter MacKay	Sean Fraser
Nova Scotia	South Shore—St. Margaret's	Gerald Keddy	Bernadette Jordan
Nova Scotia	West Nova	Greg Kerr	Colin Fraser
Ontario	Carleton—Mississippi Mills (Note: now called Kanata—Carleton)	Gordon O'Connor	Karen McCrimmon
Ontario	Elgin—Middlesex—London	Joe Preston	Karen Vecchio
Ontario	Guelph	Frank Valeriote	Lloyd Longfield
Ontario	Haliburton—Kawartha Lakes—Brock	Barry Devolin	Jamie Schmale
Ontario	Hamilton Mountain	Chris Charlton	Scott Duvall
Ontario	Kingston and the Islands	Ted Hsu	Mark Gerretsen
Ontario	Northumberland—Quinte West (Note: now called Northumberland—Peterborough South)	Rick Norlock	Kim Rudd
Ontario	Perth Wellington	Gary Schellenberger	John Nater
Ontario	Sarnia—Lambton	Patricia Davidson	Marilyn Gladu
Ontario	Windsor—Tecumseh	Joe Comartin	Cheryl Hardcastle
Quebec	Brome—Missisquoi	Pierre Jacob	Denis Paradis
Quebec	Jonquière—Alma (Note: now called Jonquière)	Claude Patry	Karine Trudel
Quebec	Louis-Saint-Laurent	Alexandrine Latendresse	Gérard Deltell
Quebec	Mégantic—L'Érable	Christian Paradis	Luc Berthold
Quebec	Mount Royal	Irwin Cotler	Anthony Housefather
Quebec	Richmond—Arthabaska	André Bellavance	Alain Rayes
Quebec	Saint-Hyacinthe—Bagot	Marie-Claude Morin	Brigitte Sansoucy
Quebec	Saint-Jean	Tarik Brahmi	Jean Rioux
Quebec	Saint-Léonard—Saint-Michel	Massimo Pacetti	Nicola Di Iorio
Quebec	Saint-Maurice—Champlain	Lise St-Denis	François-Philippe Champagne
Quebec	Shefford	Réjean Genest	Pierre Breton
Quebec	Verchères—Les Patriotes (Note: now called Pierre-Boucher—Les Patriotes—Verchères)	Sana Hassainia	Xavier Barsalou-Duval
Saskatchewan	Palliser (Note: now called Moose Jaw—Lake Centre—Lanigan)	Ray Boughen	Tom Lukiwski
Saskatchewan	Saskatoon—Wanuskewin (Note: now called Carlton Trail—Eagle Creek)	Maurice Vellacott	Kelly Block
Saskatchewan	Souris—Moose Mountain	Ed Komarnicki	Robert Kitchen
Saskatchewan	Yorkton—Melville	Garry Breitkreuz	Cathay Wagantall

== Lost Nomination ==
Province	Electoral district	Outgoing incumbent (at 2011 and at dissolution)	Succeeded by
Ontario	Mississauga—Brampton South (Note: now called Mississauga—Malton)	Eve Adams	Navdeep Bains
Quebec	Jeanne-Le Ber (Note: now called Ville-Marie—Le Sud-Ouest—Île-des-Sœurs)	Tyrone Benskin	Marc Miller
Quebec	Joliette	Francine Raynault	Gabriel Ste-Marie
Quebec	Laurentides—Labelle	Marc-André Morin	David de Burgh Graham
Saskatchewan	Blackstrap (Note: now called Saskatoon—Grasswood)	Lynne Yelich	Kevin Waugh

== Seats vacant at dissolution ==
Province	Electoral district	Outgoing incumbent (at 2011 and at time of resignation)	Succeeded by
Ontario	Barrie (Note: now called Barrie—Innisfil)	Patrick Brown	John Brassard
Ontario	Ottawa West—Nepean	John Baird	Anita Vandenbeld
Ontario	Peterborough (Note: now called Peterborough—Kawartha)	Dean Del Mastro	Maryam Monsef
Ontario	Sudbury	Glenn Thibeault	Paul Lefebvre
