= 2015 Canadian federal election in Quebec =

- October 19, 2015

All 78 Quebec seats in the House of Commons of Canada
- Opinion polls
- Registered: 6,393,478
- Turnout: 4,303,758 (67.3)
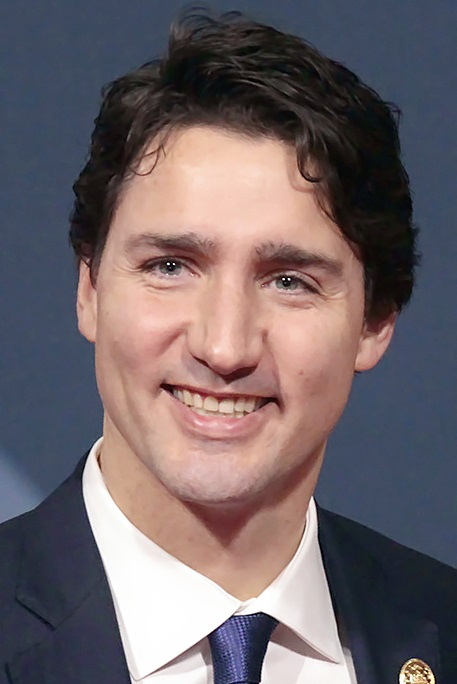

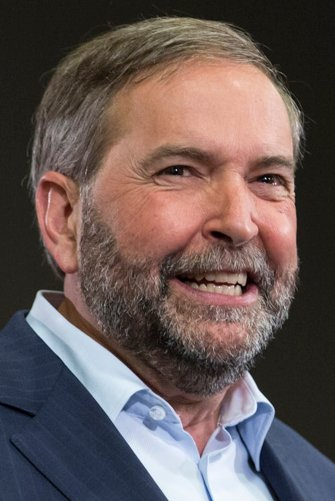

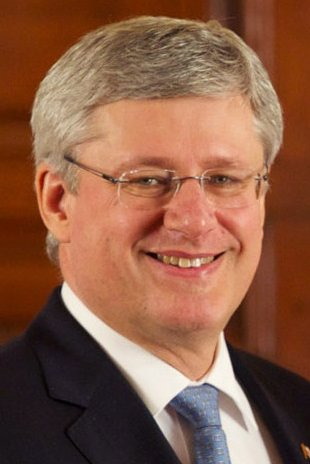

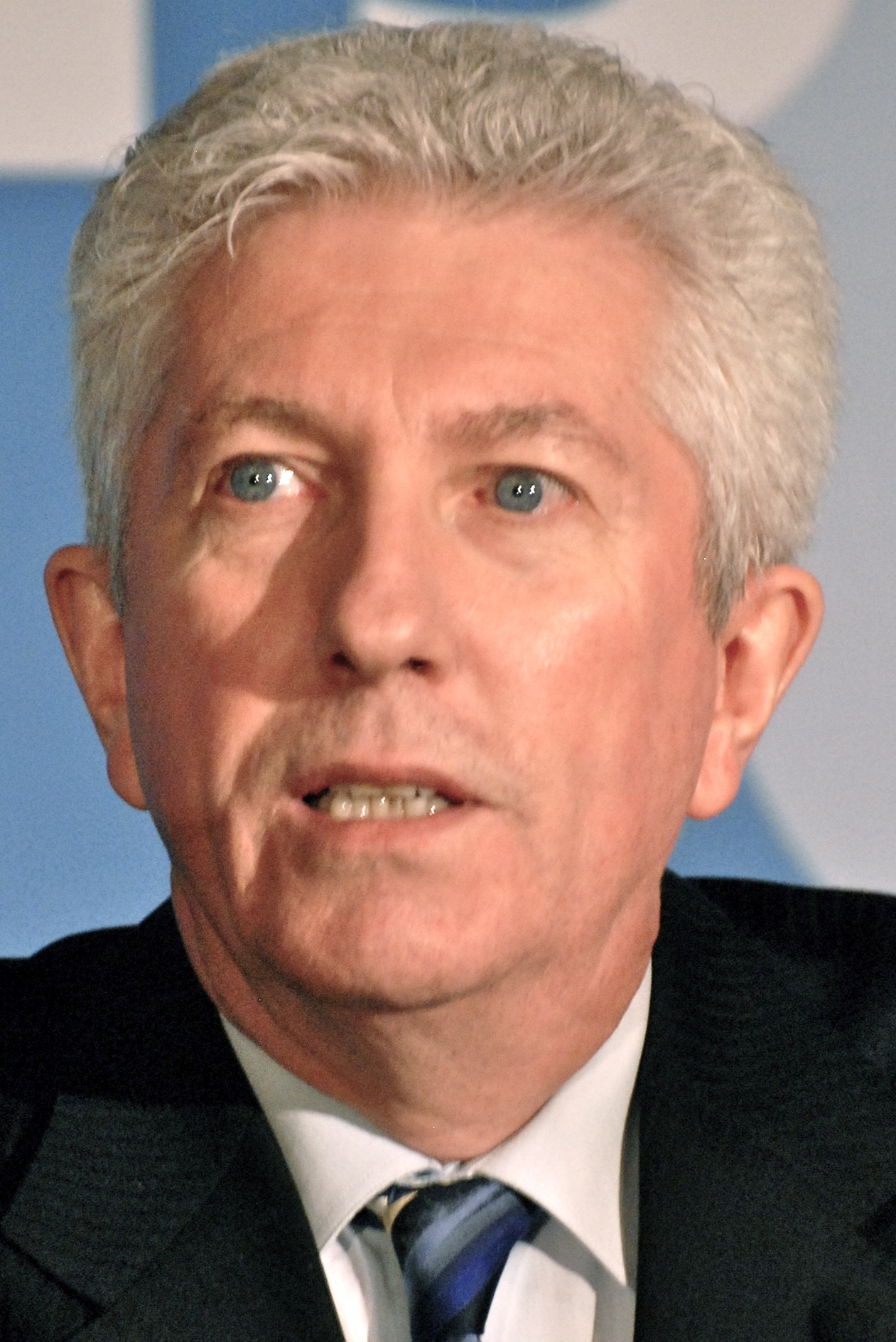
	First party	Second party
Leader	Justin Trudeau	Tom Mulcair
Party	Liberal	New Democratic
Leader since	April 14, 2013	March 24, 2012
Last election	7 seats, 14.2%	59 seats, 42.9%
Seats before	7	54 (Note: Includes José Núñez-Melo, who sat as a member of the NDP at the dissolution of Parliament, but ran as a Green Party candidate in the 2015 election. Does not include Maria Mourani, who sat as an independent at the dissolution of Parliament, but ran as an NDP candidate in the 2015 election.)
Seats won	40	16
Seat change	▲33	▼38
Popular vote	1,515,673	1,075,366
Percentage	35.7%	25.4%
Swing	▲21.5 pp	▼17.5 pp
	Third party	Fourth party
Leader	Stephen Harper	Gilles Duceppe
Party	Conservative	Bloc Québécois
Leader since	March 20, 2004	June 10, 2015 (Note: Appointed as leader without a leadership election.)
Last election	5 seats, 16.5%	4 seats, 23.4%
Seats before	5	2
Seats won	12	10
Seat change	▲7	▲8
Popular vote	709,164	821,144
Percentage	16.7%	19.3%
Swing	▲0.2 pp	▼4.1 pp
Prime minister before election
Stephen Harper
Conservative
Prime minister after election
Justin Trudeau
Liberal

In the 2015 Canadian federal election, there were 78 members of Parliament elected to the House of Commons from the province of Quebec, making up 23.1% of all members of the House.

The Liberal party became the biggest party in Quebec, a position they have held as of 2025.

== Background ==
=== 2012 electoral redistribution ===
The 2015 Canadian federal election was the first election to utilize the electoral districts established following the 2012 Canadian federal electoral redistribution. The House of Commons increased from 308 seats to 338 seats, with Quebec's number of seats increasing from 75 to 78 seats. This made the average population per constituency in Quebec 104,671 (according to the 2011 Canadian census), which was 672 more people per electoral district than the national average.

2011 results transposed onto 2013 boundaries
Party	MPs		
Party	2011 actual result	2011 notional result	Change
New Democratic	59	61	▲2
Liberal	7	8	▲1
Conservative	5	5	0
Bloc Québécois	4	4	0
Total seats	75	78	3 ▲

=== Timeline ===
Changes in Quebec seats held (2011–2015)
Seat	Before				Change		
Seat	Date	Member	Party	Reason	Date	Member	Party
Saint-Maurice—Champlain	January 10, 2012	Lise St-Denis	█ New Democratic	Crossed the floor			█ Liberal
Jonquière—Alma	February 27, 2013	Claude Patry	█ New Democratic	Crossed the floor			█ Bloc Québécois
Bourassa	June 2, 2013	Denis Coderre	█ Liberal	Resigned to run for mayor of Montreal	November 25, 2013	Emmanuel Dubourg	█ Liberal
Ahuntsic	September 12, 2013.	Maria Mourani	█ Bloc Québécois	Expelled from caucus			█ Independent (Note: On 19 November 2014, Mourani announced that she would run for the NDP in the next election, though as per the party's policy on crossing the floor she remained an independent MP until the election.)
Montcalm	June 6, 2014	Manon Perreault	█ New Democratic	Suspended from caucus			█ Independent (Note: Sat as an independent for the remainder of her term, but ran as a Strength in Democracy candidate in the 2015 election.)
Haute-Gaspésie—La Mitis—Matane—Matapédia	August 12, 2014.	Jean-François Fortin	█ Bloc Québécois	Resigned from caucus			█ Independent
Verchères—Les Patriotes	August 20, 2014	Sana Hassainia	█ New Democratic	Changed affiliation			█ Independent
Richmond—Arthabaska	August 25, 2014	André Bellavance	█ Bloc Québécois	Resigned from caucus			█ Independent
Haute-Gaspésie—La Mitis—Matane—Matapédia	October 21, 2014.	Jean-François Fortin	█ Independent	Co-founded Strength in Democracy			█ Str. in Demo.
Repentigny	October 21, 2014	Jean-François Larose	█ New Democratic	Co-founded Strength in Democracy			█ Str. in Demo.
Saint-Léonard—Saint-Michel	November 5, 2014	Massimo Pacetti	█ Liberal	Suspended from caucus			█ Independent

== Results ==
Results of the 2015 Canadian federal election showing support for Bloc Québécois candidates by riding

=== Summary ===
Quebec summary seat results in the 2015 Canadian federal election
Party	Votes	Vote %	Vote +/-	Seats	Seat +/-
Liberal	1,515,673	35.7%	▲21.5pp	40 / 78 (51%)	▲33
New Democratic	1,075,366	25.4%	▼17.5pp	16 / 78 (21%)	▼38 (Note: Includes José Núñez-Melo, who sat as a member of the NDP at the dissolution of Parliament, but ran as a Green Party candidate in the 2015 election. Does not include Maria Mourani, who sat as an independent at the dissolution of Parliament, but ran as an NDP candidate in the 2015 election.)
Conservative	709,164	16.7%	▲0.2pp	12 / 78 (15%)	▲7
Bloc Québécois	821,144	19.3%	▼4.1pp	10 / 78 (13%)	▲8
Green	95,395	2.3%	▲0.2pp	0 / 78 (0%)	0 (Note: Does not include José Núñez-Melo, who sat as a member of the NDP at the dissolution of Parliament, but ran as a Green Party candidate in the 2015 election)
Strength in Democracy	8,059	0.2%	▲0.2pp	0 / 78 (0%)	▼2 (Note: Does not include Manon Perreault, who sat as an independent at the dissolution of Parliament, but ran as a Strength in Democracy candidate in the 2015 election.)
Independent	3,438	0.1%	pp	0 / 78 (0%)	▼4 (Note: Includes Manon Perreault, who sat as an independent at the dissolution of Parliament, but ran as a Strength in Democracy candidate in the 2015 election. Includes Maria Mourani, who sat as an independent at the dissolution of Parliament, but ran as an NDP candidate in the 2015 election.)
Other	13,248	0.3%	pp	0 / 78 (0%)	0
Total	4,241,487	100%	–	78 / 78 (100%)	▲3 (Note: Quebec gained 3 seats in the electoral redistribution.)
Seat apportionment diagram:

=== Comparison with national results ===
Results by party
Party	Popular vote %			Seats in caucus
Party	QC	Natl. avg.	diff.	Seats in caucus
Liberal	35.7	39.5	-3.8	40 / 184 (22%)
New Democratic	25.4	19.7	+5.7	16 / 44 (36%)
Conservative	16.7	31.9	-15.2	12 / 99 (12%)
Bloc Québécois	19.3	4.7	+14.6	10 / 10 (100%)
Green	2.3	3.4	-1.1	0 / 1 (0%)
Total	–	–	–	78 / 338 (23%)

=== New Democratic Party Decline ===
During the 2015 election, Tom Mulcair's and NDP's stance on a niqab issue contributed to a decline in the party's support in Quebec.

The Bloc Québécois supported banning the face covering during citizenship ceremony and voting.

== Student Vote results ==
Student votes are mock elections, running parallel to actual elections, in which students not of voting age participate. They are administered by Student Vote Canada. These are for educational purposes and do not count towards the results. Note that the total seats adds up to 79 instead of 78, due to ties.

Summary of the 2015 Canadian Student Vote in Quebec
Party	Leader	Seats		Popular vote	
Party	Leader	Elected	%	Votes	%
Liberal	Justin Trudeau	51	64.56	19,205	37.26
New Democratic	Tom Mulcair	19	24.05	12,263	23.79
Conservative	Stephen Harper	8	10.13	7,258	14.08
Green	Elizabeth May	1	1.27	5,134	9.96
Bloc Québécois	Gilles Duceppe	0	0	5,924	11.49
Other		0	0	1,766	3.43
Total		79*	100.00	51,550	100.00 ;
Source: Student Vote Canada
