= Jean-Yves Laforest =

Canadian politician (born 1949)

Member of Parliament for Saint-Maurice—Champlain
- In office January 23, 2006 – May 2, 2011
- Preceded by: Marcel Gagnon
- Succeeded by: Lise St-Denis

Personal details
- Born: June 13, 1949 (age 76) Shawinigan, Quebec, Canada
- Party: Bloc Québécois
- Profession: school administrator

Jean-Yves Laforest (born June 13, 1949 in Shawinigan, Quebec) is a former Canadian politician who served as the member of Parliament for the riding of Saint-Maurice—Champlain from 2006 to 2011.

== Background ==
Before he entered politics, Laforest was an administrator by profession.

== Member of Parliament ==
He was first elected to the House of Commons of Canada in the 2006 federal election representing the Bloc Québécois for the riding of Saint-Maurice—Champlain. He sat in the Bloc Québécois shadow cabinet as critic for the Economic Development Agency of Canada for the Regions of Quebec. He lost his riding to the NDP in the 2011 federal election.

Briefly after TQS, a Quebec-based TV network, announced that it would abolish its information services division, Laforest introduced legislation that would create a separate branch of the Canadian Radio-television and Telecommunications Commission for Quebec.
