= Marc-André Morin =

Canadian politician (born 1951)

Member of Parliament for Laurentides—Labelle
- In office May 2, 2011 – October 19, 2015
- Preceded by: Johanne Deschamps
- Succeeded by: David Graham

Personal details
- Born: March 13, 1951 (age 75) Prévost, Quebec, Canada
- Party: New Democratic Party
- Profession: Environmentalist, foreman, journalist

Marc-André Morin (born March 13, 1951) is a Canadian politician, who was elected to the House of Commons of Canada in the 2011 election. He represented the electoral district of Laurentides—Labelle as a member of the New Democratic Party.

Prior to being elected, Morin was an environmentalist and journalist. He has previously worked in forestry and construction in the Yukon. On March 1, 2015, he lost the NDP nomination for the next general election to local doctor Simon-Pierre Landry.
