= David de Burgh Graham =

Canadian politician

David Graham
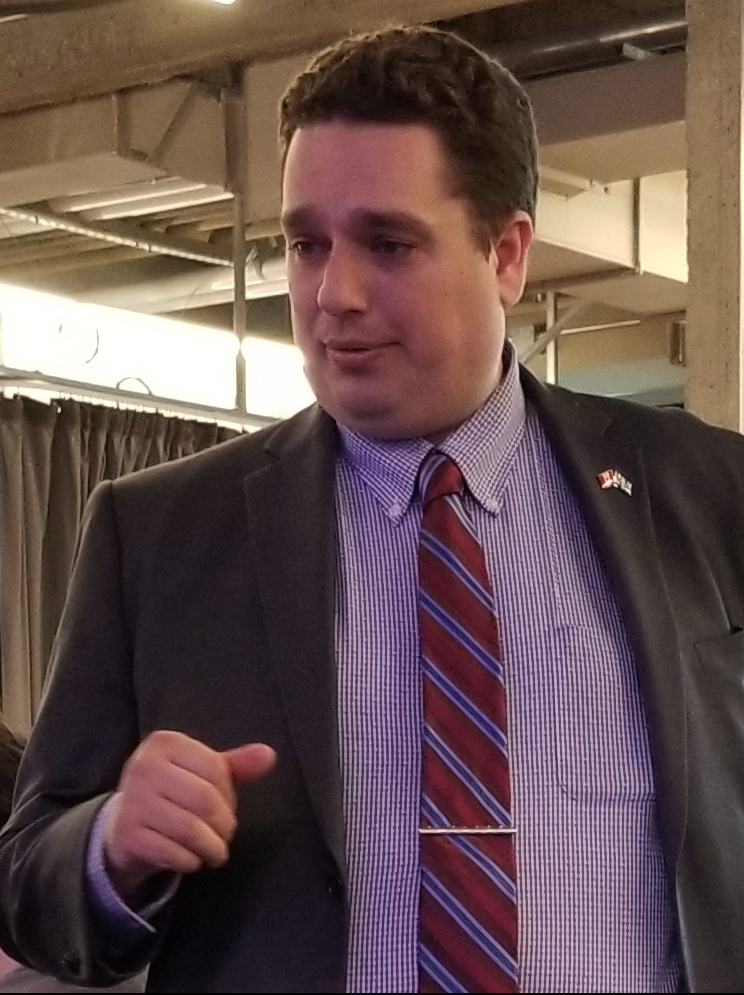

Member of Parliament for Laurentides—Labelle
- In office 19 October 2015 – 11 September 2019
- Preceded by: Marc-André Morin
- Succeeded by: Marie-Hélène Gaudreau

Personal details
- Born: 29 July 1981 (age 45) Sainte-Agathe-des-Monts, Quebec, Canada
- Party: Liberal

David de Burgh Graham (born 29 July 1981) is a Canadian politician and railway dispatcher who served as the Member of Parliament (MP) for the riding of Laurentides—Labelle from 2015 until his defeat in the 2019 federal election. A member of the Liberal Party of Canada, he is also an important player in the free software movement.

== Early life ==
Graham was born on 29 July 1981, and grew up in the Laurentides region. His great-grandfather was Hirsch Wolofsky, the founder of Keneder Adler (Canadian Eagle), a Yiddish-language newspaper in Montreal. He is the great-great-nephew of Leon Crestohl, who served as the MP for Cartier from 1950 until his death in 1963. Judaism played an important part in his life. Graham attended Hebrew School as a child, and now considers himself a Reconstructionist Jew.

=== Free Software Movement ===
At 18 years of age, Graham was an editor for the websites of the FLOSS community DevChannel.org, freshmeat.net and later the news sites Newsforge.com and Linux.com, controlled by the predecessors of Geeknet. He was co-founder of the Open and Free Technology Community in late 2001 when OpenProjects.net split into OFTC and Freenode where he was elected to four terms as president and remains as honorary adviser. In 2002, OFTC joined Software in the Public Interest, and Graham was elected to the Board of Directors in January 2004.

=== Railfan ===
Graham is a noted railfan, whose photos have appeared in several publications. He is recognized as an expert in rail transportation and public transit and the Guelph Mercury newspaper named him among the "Top 40 Under 40" for his work in public transit.

== Political career ==
Prior to his election, Graham worked as a political assistant for Liberal MP Scott Simms. In October 2015, he was elected to Parliament for the riding of Laurentides—Labelle.

As an MP, Graham was quick to start talking about open source software in an official capacity. As a long-time Linux user, Graham was able to advocate for use of free software in government.

Serving a rural riding, it was particularly important for Graham to promote high-speed internet. Graham is aware of the importance of high-speed internet in supporting any digital-first agenda for this country. Graham has been a leader in promoting Rural Digital Infrastructure, including basic cell phone access which is missing from much of Canada. He has also promoted co-operatives as a viable solution for rural broadband.

Graham was the first MP to use several references in Canada's Hansard including grok, Linux, and Electronic Frontier Foundation.

As a science fiction fan, Graham was the first to talk about Arthur Dent and The Hitchhiker's Guide to the Galaxy in the House of Commons. He also demonstrated a sense of humour with an April Fools joke discussing the petition to sell Montana to Canada for $1 trillion.

== Electoral record ==
2019 Canadian federal election: Laurentides—Labelle
Party	Candidate	Votes	%	±%	Expenditures
Bloc Québécois	Marie-Hélène Gaudreau	30,625	46.8	+17.05	$15,620.09
Liberal	David Graham	21,655	33.1	+1.0	$98,928.72
Conservative	Serge Grégoire	4,983	7.6	-2.23	$11,670.89
New Democratic	Claude Dufour	4,122	6.3	-20.05	$10,091.59
Green	Gaël Chantrel	3,157	4.8	+2.82	$2,631.54
People's	Richard Evanko	418	0.6		$2,112.25
Rhinoceros	Ludovic Schneider	272	0.4		none listed
Independent	Michel Leclerc	174	0.3		$1,784.92
Total valid votes/expense limit		65,406	100.00		
Total rejected ballots		1018	1.53	-0.07	
Turnout		66,424	66.22	-0.15	
Eligible voters		100,315			
Bloc Québécois gain from Liberal		Swing		+8.03	
Source: Elections Canada

2015 Canadian federal election
Party	Candidate	Votes	%	±%	Expenditures
Liberal	David Graham	20,277	32.10	+19.43	$42,071.27
Bloc Québécois	Johanne Régimbald	18,793	29.75	-1.71	$38,438.60
New Democratic	Simon-Pierre Landry	16,644	26.35	-17.48	$46,974.86
Conservative	Sylvain Charron	6,209	9.83	+0.56	$4,589.93
Green	Niloufar Hedjazi	1,251	1.98	-0.53	–
Total valid votes/Expense limit		63,173	100.00		$259,852.50
Total rejected ballots		1,030	1.60	–	
Turnout		64,203	66.37	–	
Eligible voters		96,737			
Liberal gain from New Democratic		Swing		+18.45	
Source: Elections Canada
