= François-Philippe Champagne =

Canadian politician (born 1970)

The Honourable François-Philippe Champagne PC MP
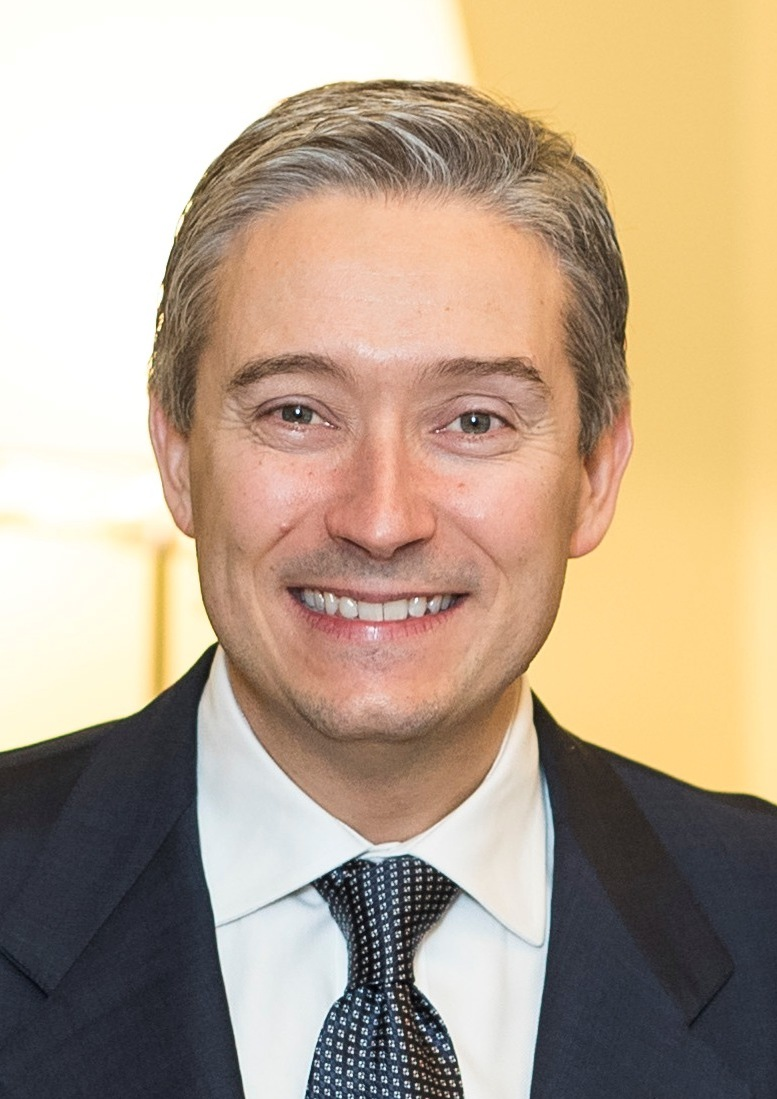
- Champagne in 2017

Minister of Finance
- Incumbent
- Assumed office March 14, 2025
- Prime Minister: Mark Carney
- Preceded by: Dominic LeBlanc

Minister of National Revenue
- Incumbent
- Assumed office May 13, 2025
- Prime Minister: Mark Carney
- Preceded by: Élisabeth Brière
Former ministerial positions
Minister of Innovation, Science and Industry
In office January 12, 2021 – March 14, 2025
Prime Minister	Justin Trudeau
Preceded by	Navdeep Bains
Succeeded by	Anita Anand
Minister of Foreign Affairs
In office November 20, 2019 – January 12, 2021
Prime Minister	Justin Trudeau
Preceded by	Chrystia Freeland
Succeeded by	Marc Garneau
Minister of Infrastructure and Communities
In office July 18, 2018 – November 20, 2019
Prime Minister	Justin Trudeau
Preceded by	Amarjeet Sohi
Succeeded by	Catherine McKenna
Minister of International Trade
In office January 10, 2017 – July 18, 2018
Prime Minister	Justin Trudeau
Preceded by	Chrystia Freeland
Succeeded by	Jim Carr

Member of Parliament for Saint-Maurice—Champlain
- Incumbent
- Assumed office October 19, 2015
- Preceded by: Lise St-Denis

Personal details
- Born: June 25, 1970 (age 56) Greenfield Park, Quebec, Canada
- Party: Liberal
- Education: Université de Montréal; Case Western Reserve University School of Law
- Occupation: Lawyer; politician

François-Philippe Champagne (Note: French pronunciation: [fʁɑ̃swa filip ʃɑ̃paɲ]) (born June 25, 1970) is a Canadian lawyer and politician who has been Minister of Finance and National Revenue since 2025. A member of the Liberal Party, he was elected to the House of Commons in the 2015 election, serving as the member of Parliament (MP) for Saint-Maurice—Champlain. Champagne joined Cabinet in 2017 and assumed his current roles as the minister of finance in March 2025 and minister of national revenue in May 2025.

In 2017, Champagne became the minister of international trade in the government of Prime Minister Justin Trudeau. He then served as the minister of infrastructure and communities from 2018 to 2019 before becoming the minister of foreign affairs. In 2021, he became minister of innovation science and industry. Prime Minister Mark Carney selected Champagne to be finance minister after taking office in 2025.

== Early life ==
Champagne was born on June 25, 1970, in Greenfield Park, Quebec. His parents divorced when he was a small child and he split his time between his father's home in Shawinigan and his mother's apartment in Sainte-Foy, Quebec City. His father Gilles owned a water treatment company in Shawinigan and was "a prominent entrepreneur".

Champagne attended CEGEP in Trois-Rivières and later studied law at the Université de Montréal. He went on to complete a postgraduate program at the Case Western Reserve University School of Law in Cleveland, Ohio, where he won a scholarship for non-American students. After graduating he lived in Wickliffe and worked for Bailey Controls, an industrial automation systems manufacturer that had been acquired by Italian conglomerate Elsag SpA. In 1994, Champagne moved to Italy to work for Elsag, living in Genoa and learning to speak Italian. The company was taken over by Swiss firm ABB Group in 1998 and the following year he moved to Zurich.

In 2008, Champagne joined engineering and project management consultancy Amec PLC as director of strategic development. According to The Globe and Mail, by this point he had "built a network of business contacts across Europe, helping him land him on the World Economic Forum's 2009 roster of young global leaders".

== Political career ==
In an interview with The Globe and Mail in London, 2009, Champagne expressed his desire to eventually return to Canada and enter politics, citing fellow Shawinigan resident Jean Chrétien as an inspiration. Ahead of the 2015 Canadian federal election, he was nominated as the Liberal candidate in Saint-Maurice—Champlain, a riding represented at the time by New Democratic-turned-Liberal MP Lise St-Denis, and was elected to Parliament on October 19, 2015.

After his election in 2015, Champagne was appointed as parliamentary secretary to the Minister of Finance until 2017, when he was appointed Minister of International Trade.

=== Minister of Infrastructure and Communities (2018–2019) ===
In 2018, Champagne was named Minister of Infrastructure and Communities, and oversaw the federal government's $187 billion infrastructure investment plan.

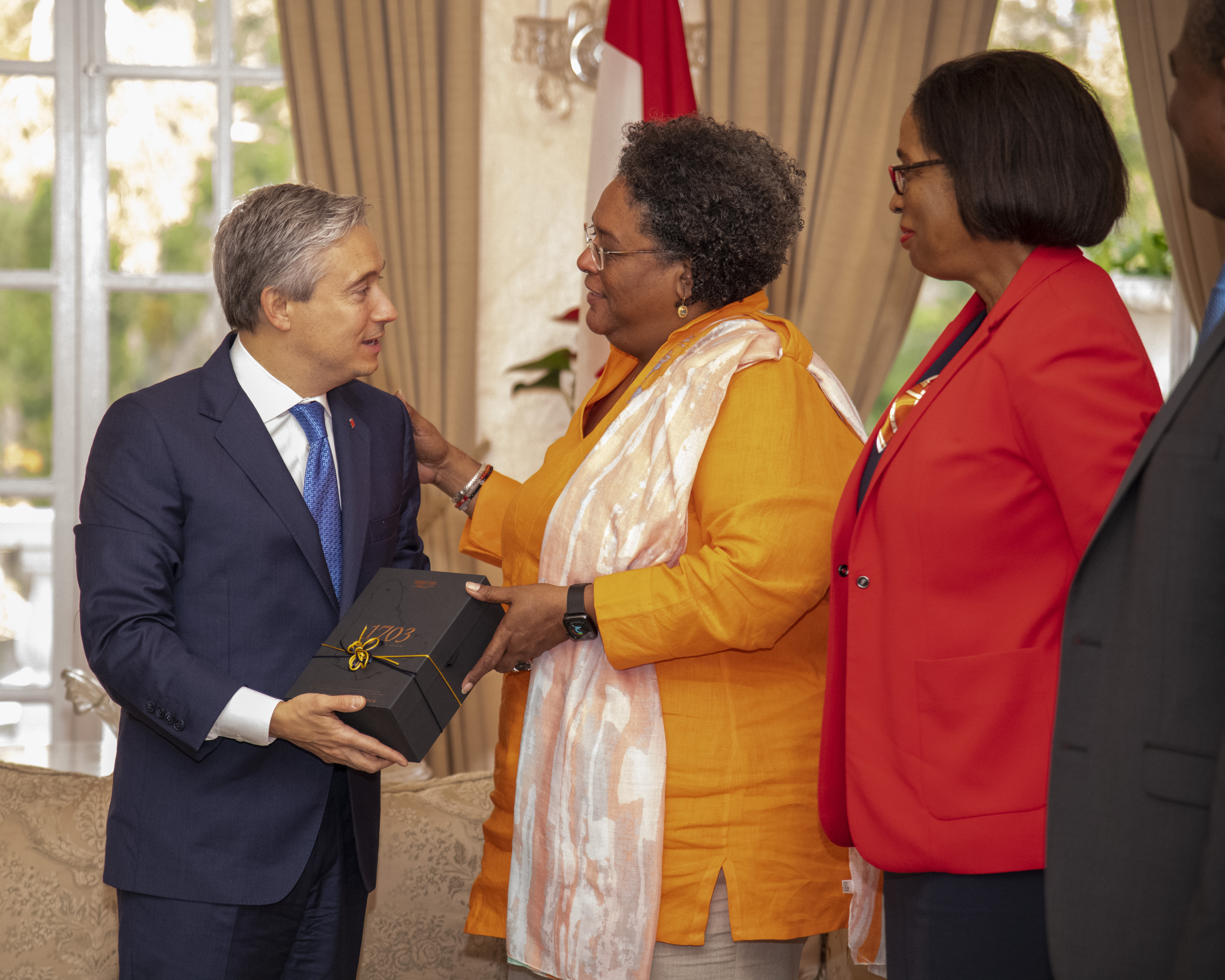
Champagne in Barbados in 2020

=== Minister of Foreign Affairs (2019–2021) ===
In November 2019, Champagne became Minister of Foreign Affairs, taking the helm of Trudeau's foreign policy.

In June 2020, it was reported that Champagne had two more mortgages with the state-owned Bank of China, raising questions of potential vulnerability to foreign influence.

Champagne welcomed Trump's peace agreement between Israel and the United Arab Emirates as a positive and historic step toward a peaceful and secure Middle East, adding Canada was gladdened by suspension of Israel's plans to annex parts of the occupied Palestinian territories in the West Bank.

=== Minister of Innovation, Science and Industry (2021–2025) ===
In the 2021 Canadian cabinet shuffle, Champagne was moved out of the foreign affairs portfolio, and became Minister of Innovation, Science and Industry. Champagne was characterized by Politico in 2023 as "Trudeau's pitchman" for a global audience, tasked with luring would-be foreign investment in the United States to instead invest in Canada. His efforts were credited with enticing Volkswagen to construct a gigafactory in Canada rather than the U.S., a first for the company outside of Europe.

In 2024, he suggested that the Competition Bureau should scrutinize Big Tech companies' activities in the payments sector. Champagne highlighted competition-related concerns associated with Apple and Google's digital wallet services.

Champagne was widely considered to be a possible candidate in the 2025 Liberal Party of Canada leadership election, following the resignation of Prime Minister Justin Trudeau. He later announced that he would not enter the leadership race to focus on defending Canadians from the threat of tariffs of the second Trump administration. On January 16, he endorsed former Bank of Canada governor Mark Carney.

=== Minister of Finance (2025–present) ===
Champagne was appointed minister of finance on March 14, 2025, upon the swearing-in of Mark Carney's cabinet. Following the 2025 federal election, he was additionally given the responsibility of National Revenue. In July 2025, Champagne asked fellow cabinet ministers to find savings in their departments, with the goal of a 15% government operational spending cut by 2029. Champagne announced in October that the government would establish a Financial Crimes Agency in 2026, along with a "national anti-fraud strategy". He presented the 2025 federal budget in November, promising to reduce the civil service by about 40,000 positions, cut temporary immigration from 673,650 in 2025 to 385,000 in 2026, balance operational spending by 2029, and reach the 2% of GDP NATO target for military spending by 2026.

In January 2026, the government announced the "Canada Groceries and Essentials Benefit", which will increase quarterly goods and services tax (GST) payments by 25 percent over five years. It was also announced that a one-time GST top-up of 50 percent would be implemented in June 2026.

In September 2026, Champagne announced an extension of federal government's temporary suspension of the excise tax on gasoline and diesel, which had originally been scheduled to end after Labour Day. The measure introduced by Prime Minister Mark Carney in April 2026 in response to rising global fuel prices, reduced the federal excise tax by 10 cents per litre on gasoline and four cents per litre on diesel. The extension was intended to provide continued relief to Canadian households and businesses facing higher fuel costs.

== Personal life ==
As of 2025, Champagne lived with his domestic partner Anne-Marie Gaudet in Grand-Mère, Quebec.

Champagne is trilingual, speaking English, French and Italian.

== Electoral record ==
2025 Canadian federal election: Saint-Maurice—Champlain
Party	Candidate	Votes	%	±%	Expenditures
Liberal	François-Philippe Champagne	31,095	49.96	+7.51	$75,375.85
Conservative	Pierre-Augustin Allard	15,321	24.62	+6.62	$4,886.36
Bloc Québécois	Thierry Bilodeau	13,190	21.19	–8.88	$12,630.11
New Democratic	Nathalie Garceau	1,224	1.97	–3.09	$0.00
Green	Marie-Claude Gaudet	704	1.13	–0.17	$0.00
People's	David Rioux	455	0.73	N/A	$0.00
Rhinoceros	Dji-Pé Frazer	251	0.40	–0.10	$0.00
Total valid votes/expense limit		62,240	98.42	+0.81	$160,164.87
Total rejected ballots		1,001	1.58	–0.81	
Turnout		63,241	65.78	+4.23	
Eligible voters		96,138			
Liberal hold		Swing		+0.45	
Source: Elections Canada

2019 Canadian federal election: Saint-Maurice—Champlain
Party	Candidate	Votes	%	±%	Expenditures
Liberal	François-Philippe Champagne	23,104	39.55	-1.97	$101,231.55
Bloc Québécois	Nicole Morin	19,950	34.15	+14.99	$4,638.18
Conservative	Bruno-Pier Courchesne	9,542	16.33	+0.06	none listed
New Democratic	Barthélémy Boisguérin	3,071	5.26	-15.51	none listed
Green	Stéphanie Dufresne	1,809	3.10	+1.16	none listed
People's	Julie Déziel	938	1.61	–	none listed
Total valid votes/expense limit		58,414	100.0		
Total rejected ballots		1,307	2.19		
Turnout		59,721	65.20		
Eligible voters		91,594			
Liberal hold		Swing		-8.48	
Source: Elections Canada

2015 Canadian federal election: Saint-Maurice—Champlain
Party	Candidate	Votes	%	±%	Expenditures
Liberal	François-Philippe Champagne	24,475	41.52	+30.59	$107,029.87
New Democratic	Jean-Yves Tremblay	12,245	20.77	−20.51	$29,855.51
Bloc Québécois	Sacki Carignan Deschamps	11,295	19.16	−9.31	$32,567.29
Conservative	Jacques Grenier	9,592	16.27	−0.86	$49,358.13
Green	Martial Toupin	1,144	1.94	−0.09	$3,832.69
Marxist–Leninist	Jean-Paul Bédard	196	0.33	–	–
Total valid votes/Expense limit		58,947	100.0		$269,923.91
Total rejected ballots		1,175	–	–	
Turnout		60,122	–	–	
Eligible voters		92,086			
Source: Elections Canada

== Notes ==
30th Canadian Ministry (2025–present) – Cabinet of Mark Carney
Cabinet posts (2)
Predecessor	Office	Successor
Élisabeth Brière	Minister of National Revenue; 2025–present	Incumbent
Dominic LeBlanc	Minister of Finance; 2025–present	Incumbent
29th Canadian Ministry (2015–2025) – Cabinet of Justin Trudeau
Cabinet posts (4)
Predecessor	Office	Successor
Navdeep Bains	Minister of Innovation, Science and Industry; 2021–2025	Anita Anand
Chrystia Freeland	Minister of Foreign Affairs; 2019–2021	Marc Garneau
Amarjeet Sohi	Minister of Infrastructure and Communities; 2018–2019	Catherine McKenna
Chrystia Freeland	Minister of International Trade; 2017–2018	Jim Carr
Order of precedence
Preceded by Mélanie Joly as Member of the Cabinet	Order of Precedence of Canada as Member of the Cabinet	Succeeded by Anita Anand as Member of the Cabinet
