= Laurentides—Labelle =

Federal electoral district in Quebec, Canada

Quebec electoral district
- Interactive map of riding boundaries from the 2025 federal election
- Coordinates: 46.219°N 74.500°W

Federal electoral district
- Legislature: House of Commons
MP
Marie-Hélène Gaudreau
Bloc Québécois
- District created: 2003
- First contested: 2004
- Last contested: 2021
- District webpage: profile, map

Demographics
- Population (2016): 113,815
- Electors (2019): 100,315
- Area (km²): 19,694
- Pop. density (per km²): 5.8
- Census division(s): Antoine-Labelle RCM, Les Laurentides RCM
- Census subdivision(s): Mont-Laurier, Sainte-Agathe-des-Monts, Mont-Tremblant, Val-David, Rivière-Rouge, Saint-Donat, Mont-Blanc, Val-Morin, Lac-des-Écorces, Labelle

Laurentides—Labelle is a federal electoral district in Quebec, Canada, that has been represented in the House of Commons of Canada since 2004.

== Geography ==
The district is located north of Gatineau and northwest of Montreal, in the Quebec region of Laurentides. It includes the Regional County Municipalities of Antoine-Labelle, and Les Laurentides, and the eastern part of Les Pays-d'en-Haut.

The main towns are Saint-Sauveur, Sainte-Agathe-des-Monts, Mont-Laurier, Mont-Tremblant and Val-David.

The neighbouring ridings are Argenteuil—Papineau—Des Collines, Pontiac—Kitigan Zibi, Saint-Maurice—Champlain, Joliette—Manawan and Les Pays-d'en-Haut.

== Demographics ==
According to the 2021 Canadian census, 2023 representation order

Racial groups: 94.6% White, 4.0% Indigenous
Languages: 94.0% French, 5.3% English
Religions: 70.8% Christian (64.8% Catholic, 5.9% other), 28.4% none
Median income: $36,400 (2020)
Average income: $45,320 (2020)

== History ==
The electoral district was created in 2004: 61.5 per cent of the riding came from Laurentides, 34.9 per cent from Pontiac—Gatineau—Labelle, and 3.6 per cent from Argenteuil—Papineau—Mirabel. The borders of the riding were not changed in the 2012 electoral redistribution.

Following the 2022 Canadian federal electoral redistribution, the riding gained the municipalities of Saint-Donat and Notre-Dame-de-la-Merci from Joliette, and lost all of its territory in the Les Pays-d'en-Haut Regional County Municipality to the new riding of Les Pays-d'en-Haut.

=== Member of Parliament ===
This riding has elected the following members of the House of Commons of Canada:

Parliament	Years	Member	Party
Laurentides—Labelle; Riding created from Laurentides, Pontiac—Gatineau—Labelle and Argenteuil—Papineau—Mirabel
38th	2004–2006	Johanne Deschamps	Bloc Québécois
39th	2006–2008	Johanne Deschamps	Bloc Québécois
40th	2008–2011	Johanne Deschamps	Bloc Québécois
41st	2011–2015	Marc-André Morin	New Democratic
42nd	2015–2019	David Graham	Liberal
43rd	2019–2021	Marie-Hélène Gaudreau	Bloc Québécois
44th	2021–2025	Marie-Hélène Gaudreau	Bloc Québécois
45th	2025–present	Marie-Hélène Gaudreau	Bloc Québécois

== Election results ==
Graph of election results in Laurentides—Labelle (minor parties that never got 2% of the vote or didn't run consistently are omitted) View source data.

2025 Canadian federal election
Party	Candidate	Votes	%	±%	Expenditures
Bloc Québécois	Marie-Hélène Gaudreau	23,615	44.57	−7.74	$51,391.09
Liberal	Emrick Vienneau	18,514	34.94	+11.48	$11,788.84
Conservative	Daniel Paquette	7,900	14.91	+4.41	$2,249.98
New Democratic	Michel Noël De Tilly	1,341	2.53	−3.03	$1,748.01
Green	Michel Le Comte	864	1.63	−0.79	$3,996.61
People's	Amélie Charbonneau	749	1.41	−2.22	$0.00
Total valid votes		52,983	98.34	+0.45	$137,668.06
Total rejected ballots		896	1.66	–0.45	
Turnout		53,879	65.53	+4.54	
Eligible voters		82,215			
Bloc Québécois notional hold		Swing		−9.61	
Source: Elections Canada

2021 federal election redistributed results
Party	Vote	%
Bloc Québécois	24,463	52.31
Liberal	10,974	23.47
Conservative	4,910	10.50
New Democratic	2,601	5.56
People's	1,701	3.64
Green	1,132	2.42
Free	841	1.80
Independent	132	0.28
Marijuana	11	0.02
Total valid votes	46,765	97.89
Rejected ballots	1,008	2.11
Registered voters/ estimated turnout	78,328	60.99

2021 Canadian federal election
Party	Candidate	Votes	%	±%	Expenditures
Bloc Québécois	Marie-Hélène Gaudreau	32,133	50.11	+3.29	$21,484.26
Liberal	Antoine Menassa	15,966	24.90	-8.21	$30,189.73
Conservative	Kathy Laframboise	6,770	10.56	+2.94	$4,502.65
New Democratic	Eric-Abel Baland	3,907	6.09	-0.21	$2,232.62
People's	Richard Evanko	2,432	3.79	+3.15	$2,846.39
Green	Michel Le Comte	1,570	2.45	-2.38	$0.00
Free	Michel Leclerc	1,165	1.82	+1.55	$2,135.77
Independent	Jean-Noël Sorel	180	0.28	–	2,135.77
Total valid votes/expense limit		64,123	98.02	–	$140,281.75
Total rejected ballots		1,293	1.98	–	
Turnout		65,416	61.91	-4.30	
Registered voters		105,659			
Bloc Québécois hold		Swing		+5.75	
Source: Elections Canada

2019 Canadian federal election
Party	Candidate	Votes	%	±%	Expenditures
Bloc Québécois	Marie-Hélène Gaudreau	30,625	46.8	+17.05	$15,620.09
Liberal	David Graham	21,655	33.1	+1.0	$98,928.72
Conservative	Serge Grégoire	4,983	7.6	-2.23	$11,670.89
New Democratic	Claude Dufour	4,122	6.3	-20.05	$10,091.59
Green	Gaël Chantrel	3,157	4.8	+2.82	$2,631.54
People's	Richard Evanko	418	0.6		$2,112.25
Rhinoceros	Ludovic Schneider	272	0.4		none listed
Independent	Michel Leclerc	174	0.3		$1,784.92
Total valid votes/expense limit		65,406	100.00		
Total rejected ballots		1018	1.53	-0.07	
Turnout		66,424	66.22	-0.15	
Eligible voters		100,315			
Bloc Québécois gain from Liberal		Swing		+8.03	
Source: Elections Canada

2015 Canadian federal election
Party	Candidate	Votes	%	±%	Expenditures
Liberal	David Graham	20,277	32.10	+19.43	$42,071.27
Bloc Québécois	Johanne Régimbald	18,793	29.75	-1.71	$38,438.60
New Democratic	Simon-Pierre Landry	16,644	26.35	-17.48	$46,974.86
Conservative	Sylvain Charron	6,209	9.83	+0.56	$4,589.93
Green	Niloufar Hedjazi	1,251	1.98	-0.53	–
Total valid votes/expense limit		63,173	100.00		$259,852.50
Total rejected ballots		1,030	1.60	–	
Turnout		64,203	66.37	–	
Eligible voters		96,737			
Liberal gain from New Democratic		Swing		+18.45	
Source: Elections Canada

2011 Canadian federal election
Party	Candidate	Votes	%	±%	Expenditures
New Democratic	Marc-André Morin	24,800	43.83	+34.60	$1,258.43
Bloc Québécois	Johanne Deschamps	17,799	31.45	-15.63	$86,253.84
Liberal	Jean-Marc Lacoste	7,169	12.67	-14.01	$57,752.84
Conservative	Guy Joncas	5,246	9.27	-3.77	$6,075.77
Green	François Beauchamp	1,423	2.51	-1.44	
Marxist–Leninist	Mikaël St-Louis	149	0.26	–	
Total valid votes/expense limit		56,586	100.00		
Total rejected ballots		695	1.21	+0.15	
Turnout		57,281	62.44	+2.04	
Eligible voters		91,742	–	–	

2008 Canadian federal election
Party	Candidate	Votes	%	±%	Expenditures
Bloc Québécois	Johanne Deschamps	24,956	47.08	-6.7	$84,074
Liberal	Pierre Gfeller	14,143	26.68	+12.2	$68,722
Conservative	Guy Joncas	6,914	13.04	-7.3	$21,200
New Democratic	David Dupras	4,896	9.23	+2.8	$2,719
Green	Jacques Rigal	2,094	3.95	-0.9	$700
Total valid votes/expense limit		53,003	100.00	$98,720	
Total rejected ballots		570	1.06		
Turnout		53,573	60.40		

2006 Canadian federal election
Party	Candidate	Votes	%	±%	Expenditures
Bloc Québécois	Johanne Deschamps	28,217	53.8	-4.6	$82,985
Conservative	Guy Joncas	10,666	20.3	+14.5	$46,224
Liberal	Jean-Pierre Fortin	7,616	14.5	-14.9	$22,123
New Democratic	Rose-Aimée Auclair	3,382	6.5	+3.8	$1,635
Green	Richard Savignac	2,543	4.9	+1.2	
Total valid votes/expense limit		52,424	100.0	$90,966	

2004 Canadian federal election
Party	Candidate	Votes	%	±%	Expenditures
Bloc Québécois	Johanne Deschamps	28,675	58.4	–	$76,294
Liberal	Dominique Boyer	14,459	29.4	–	$75,647
Conservative	Guillaume Desjardins	2,887	5.9	–	$13,907
Green	Jacques Léger	1,781	3.6		$2,090
New Democratic	Brendan Naef	1,320	2.7		$877
Total valid votes/expense limit		49,122	100.0	$88,110	

== See also ==
- List of Canadian electoral districts
- Historical federal electoral districts of Canada
