= Johanne Deschamps =

Canadian politician

Member of Parliament for Laurentides—Labelle
- In office 2004–2011
- Preceded by: new riding
- Succeeded by: Marc-André Morin

Personal details
- Born: April 2, 1959 (age 67) Saint-Jovite, Quebec
- Party: Bloc Québécois
- Profession: administrative assistant

Johanne Deschamps (born April 2, 1959 in Saint-Jovite, Quebec) is a Canadian politician.

She is a former administrative assistant and political attaché. She served as a councillor in Val-Barrette, Quebec from 1994 to 2004 and was Commissioner of the Pierre-Neveu School Board in Mont-Laurier, Quebec from 1998 to 2004. After that, she was elected as a Bloc Québécois member of the House of Commons of Canada in the 2004 Canadian federal election. She represents the riding of Laurentides—Labelle. She had also run in the 2000 Canadian federal election for the Bloc in the riding of Pontiac—Gatineau—Labelle but lost. She was re-elected in 2006 and 2008, but lost to NDP candidate Marc-André Morin in the 2011 election.
