= Marie-Hélène Gaudreau =

Canadian politician

Marie-Hélène Gaudreau MP

Member of Parliament for Laurentides—Labelle
- Incumbent
- Assumed office October 21, 2019
- Preceded by: David de Burgh Graham

Personal details
- Born: November 24, 1976 (age 49) Mont-Laurier, Quebec, Canada
- Party: Bloc Québécois

Marie-Hélène Gaudreau MP (born November 24, 1976) is a Canadian politician who was elected to the House of Commons in the 2019 election. She represents Laurentides—Labelle as a member of the Bloc Québécois.

From 2021 to 2025 she has served as the caucus chair in the Bloc Québécois Shadow Cabinet. She was the vice president of the Procedure and House Affairs committee and studied the Foreign Interference in Canadian politics.

She was elected vice chair of the Canadian House of Commons Standing Committee on Veterans Affairs and the Canadian House of Commons Standing Committee on Government Operations and Estimates in the 45th Canadian Parliament in 2025. She is also the Bloc Québécois critic for Tourism and Children and Families.

Before entering politics, Marie-Hélène Gaudreau was a member of the Caisses Desjardins council in Les Hautes-Laurentides, founder of Table Forêt Laurentides and worked for the CSSS Antoine-Labelle. She is the owner of a Recreational Centre in Mont-Laurier. She is married and a mother of two.

At the time of the 2025 Canadian federal election, she lived in Lac-des-Écorces.

== Electoral record ==
2021 Canadian federal election: Laurentides—Labelle
Party	Candidate	Votes	%	±%	Expenditures
Bloc Québécois	Marie-Hélène Gaudreau	32,133	50.11	+3.29	$21,484.26
Liberal	Antoine Menassa	15,966	24.90	-8.21	$30,189.73
Conservative	Kathy Laframboise	6,770	10.56	+2.94	$4,502.65
New Democratic	Eric-Abel Baland	3,907	6.09	-0.21	$2,232.62
People's	Richard Evanko	2,432	3.79	+3.15	$2,846.39
Green	Michel Le Comte	1,570	2.45	-2.38	$0.00
Free	Michel Leclerc	1,165	1.82	+1.55	$2,135.77
Independent	Jean-Noël Sorel	180	0.28	–	2,135.77
Total valid votes/expense limit		64,123	98.02	–	$140,281.75
Total rejected ballots		1,293	1.98	–	
Turnout		65,416	61.91	-4.30	
Registered voters		105,659			
Bloc Québécois hold		Swing		+5.75	
Source: Elections Canada

2019 Canadian federal election: Laurentides—Labelle
Party	Candidate	Votes	%	±%	Expenditures
Bloc Québécois	Marie-Hélène Gaudreau	30,625	46.8	+17.05	$15,620.09
Liberal	David Graham	21,655	33.1	+1.0	$98,928.72
Conservative	Serge Grégoire	4,983	7.6	-2.23	$11,670.89
New Democratic	Claude Dufour	4,122	6.3	-20.05	$10,091.59
Green	Gaël Chantrel	3,157	4.8	+2.82	$2,631.54
People's	Richard Evanko	418	0.6		$2,112.25
Rhinoceros	Ludovic Schneider	272	0.4		none listed
Independent	Michel Leclerc	174	0.3		$1,784.92
Total valid votes/expense limit		65,406	100.00		
Total rejected ballots		1018	1.53	-0.07	
Turnout		66,424	66.22	-0.15	
Eligible voters		100,315			
Bloc Québécois gain from Liberal		Swing		+8.03	
Source: Elections Canada
