= Manon Perreault =

Canadian politician

Member of Parliament for Montcalm
- In office May 2, 2011 – August 4, 2015
- Preceded by: Roger Gaudet
- Succeeded by: Luc Thériault

Personal details
- Born: December 29, 1965 (age 60) Rimouski, Quebec, Canada
- Party: Strength in Democracy
- Other political affiliations: Independent (2014–2015); New Democratic (2011–2014)

Manon Perreault (born December 29, 1965) is a former Canadian politician, who served in the House of Commons of Canada from 2011 until 2015. Following her election, she was named to the NDP's shadow cabinet as critic for people with disabilities. She represented the electoral district of Montcalm as a member of the New Democratic Party until June 6, 2014, when she was suspended from the NDP caucus after being charged with public mischief. She had told police some items had been stolen from her office, when in fact a former employee had the items and voluntarily offered to return them. She was convicted on March 20, 2015. She sat as an Independent until August 12, 2015, when she joined Strength in Democracy as their candidate in Montcalm, but she was soundly defeated in the 2015 federal election by Bloc Québécois candidate Luc Thériault.

Perreault was a municipal councillor in Sainte-Marie-Salomé, Quebec from 2002 to 2009. Before being elected to parliament, Perreault was an administrator and trainer. As a person living with restricted mobility, she worked with Kéroul, an organization promoting tourism for people with disabilities, and Handami, a regional association for people with disabilities. Perreault became a paraplegic, following an equestrian accident in 1993.

She joined former cabinet minister Steven Fletcher as a member of Parliament who uses a wheelchair, and sought, among others, to use her parliamentary position to defend people with disabilities.

2011 Canadian federal election: Montcalm
Party	Candidate	Votes	%	±%	Expenditures
New Democratic	Manon Perreault	34,434	52.97	+39.1	
Bloc Québécois	Roger Gaudet	19,609	30.16	-25.5	
Conservative	Jason Fuoco	5,118	7.87	-5.6	
Liberal	Yves Dufour	3,501	5.39	-8.5	
Green	Marianne Girard	2,347	3.61	+0.5	
Total valid votes/expense limit		65,009	100.00		
Total rejected ballots		1,183	1.79	-0.3	
Turnout		66,192	61.76	–	
Eligible voters		107,180	–	–	
