= Saint-Maurice—Champlain =

Federal electoral district in Quebec, Canada

Coordinates: 47.009°N 72.620°W

Quebec electoral district
- Interactive map of riding boundaries from the 2025 federal election

Federal electoral district
- Legislature: House of Commons
MP
François-Philippe Champagne
Liberal
- District created: 2003
- First contested: 2004
- Last contested: 2025
- District webpage: profile, map

Demographics
- Population (2011): 110,273
- Electors (2015): 91,588
- Area (km²): 38,904
- Pop. density (per km²): 2.8
- Census division(s): La Tuque, Les Chenaux, Mékinac, Shawinigan
- Census subdivision(s): Trois-Rivières (part), Shawinigan, La Tuque, Notre-Dame-du-Mont-Carmel, Saint-Tite, Saint-Maurice, Sainte-Thècle, Sainte-Anne-de-la-Pérade, Obedjiwan, Champlain

Saint-Maurice–Champlain (French pronunciation: [sɛ̃ mɔʁis ʃɑ̃plɛ̃]) is a federal electoral district in Quebec, Canada, that has been represented in the House of Commons of Canada since 2004.

It consists of:

- the City of Shawinigan;
- the Regional County Municipality of Les Chenaux;
- the Agglomeration of La Tuque, including the Indian reserves of Communauté de Wemotaci, Coucoucache No. 24A and Obedjiwan No. 28;
- that part of the Regional County Municipality of Matawinie comprising the unorganized territories of Baie-Obaoca and Lac-Cabasta;
- the Regional County Municipality of Mékinac; and
- that part of the City of Trois-Rivières comprising the areas of Saint-Louis-de-France and Sainte-Marthe-du-Cap.

The neighbouring ridings are Abitibi—Baie-James—Nunavik—Eeyou, Lac-Saint-Jean, Montmorency—Charlevoix, Saint-Augustin—Portneuf—Jacques-Cartier, Bécancour—Nicolet—Saurel—Alnôbak, Trois-Rivières, Berthier—Maskinongé, Joliette—Manawan, Laurentides—Labelle, and Pontiac—Kitigan Zibi.

== Demographics ==
According to the 2021 Canadian census

Ethnic groups: 93.0% White, 5.5% Indigenous

Languages: 93.9% French, 2.6% Atikamekw, 1.1% English

Religions: 75.7% Christian (70.3% Catholic, 5.4% Other), 23.5% none

Median income: $37,200 (2020)

Average income: $43,040 (2020)

== History ==
Saint-Maurice—Champlain riding was created in 2003 from parts of Abitibi—Baie-James—Nunavik, Champlain, Roberval and Saint-Maurice ridings.

This riding gained territory from Trois-Rivières during the 2012 electoral redistribution.

=== Member of Parliament ===
Parliament	Years	Member	Party
Saint-Maurice—Champlain; Riding created from Abitibi—Baie-James—Nunavik, Champlain, Roberval and Saint-Maurice
38th	2004–2006	Marcel Gagnon	Bloc Québécois
39th	2006–2008	Jean-Yves Laforest	Bloc Québécois
40th	2008–2011	Jean-Yves Laforest	Bloc Québécois
41st	2011–2012	Lise St-Denis	New Democratic
41st	2012–2015	Lise St-Denis	Liberal
42nd	2015–2019	François-Philippe Champagne	Liberal
43rd	2019–2021	François-Philippe Champagne	Liberal
44th	2021–2025	François-Philippe Champagne	Liberal
45th	2025–present	François-Philippe Champagne	Liberal

== Election results ==
2025 Canadian federal election
Party	Candidate	Votes	%	±%	Expenditures
Liberal	François-Philippe Champagne	31,095	49.96	+7.51	$75,375.85
Conservative	Pierre-Augustin Allard	15,321	24.62	+6.62	$4,886.36
Bloc Québécois	Thierry Bilodeau	13,190	21.19	–8.88	$12,630.11
New Democratic	Nathalie Garceau	1,224	1.97	–3.09	$0.00
Green	Marie-Claude Gaudet	704	1.13	–0.17	$0.00
People's	David Rioux	455	0.73	N/A	$0.00
Rhinoceros	Dji-Pé Frazer	251	0.40	–0.10	$0.00
Total valid votes/expense limit		62,240	98.42	+0.81	$160,164.87
Total rejected ballots		1,001	1.58	–0.81	
Turnout		63,241	65.78	+4.23	
Eligible voters		96,138			
Liberal hold		Swing		+0.45	
Source: Elections Canada

2021 Canadian federal election
Party	Candidate	Votes	%	±%	Expenditures
Liberal	François-Philippe Champagne	23,913	42.45	+2.8	$72,408.64
Bloc Québécois	Jacynthe Bruneau	16,940	30.07	-4.1	$13,486.24
Conservative	Jacques Bouchard	10,139	18.00	+1.7	$3,888.81
New Democratic	Valérie Bergeron	2,849	5.06	-0.2	$4,894.13
Free	Marie Gabrielle Rouleau	932	1.65	N/A	$572.97
Green	Marie-Claude Gaudet	731	1.30	-1.8	$704.90
Marijuana	Hugo Beaumont Tremblay	307	0.54	N/A	$1,661.82
Rhinoceros	Dji-Pé Frazer	285	0.51	N/A	$0.00
Independent	Alain Magnan	241	0.43	N/A	none listed
Total valid votes/expense limit		56,337	97.61	–	$139,639.56
Total rejected ballots		1,379	2.39		
Turnout		57,716	61.55		
Eligible voters		93,769			
Liberal hold		Swing		+3.5	
Source: Elections Canada

2019 Canadian federal election
Party	Candidate	Votes	%	±%	Expenditures
Liberal	François-Philippe Champagne	23,104	39.55	-1.97	$101,231.55
Bloc Québécois	Nicole Morin	19,950	34.15	+14.99	$4,638.18
Conservative	Bruno-Pier Courchesne	9,542	16.33	+0.06	none listed
New Democratic	Barthélémy Boisguérin	3,071	5.26	-15.51	none listed
Green	Stéphanie Dufresne	1,809	3.10	+1.16	none listed
People's	Julie Déziel	938	1.61	–	none listed
Total valid votes/expense limit		58,414	100.0		
Total rejected ballots		1,307	2.19		
Turnout		59,721	65.20		
Eligible voters		91,594			
Liberal hold		Swing		-8.48	
Source: Elections Canada

2015 Canadian federal election
Party	Candidate	Votes	%	±%	Expenditures
Liberal	François-Philippe Champagne	24,475	41.52	+30.59	$107,029.87
New Democratic	Jean-Yves Tremblay	12,245	20.77	-20.51	$29,855.51
Bloc Québécois	Sacki Carignan Deschamps	11,295	19.16	-9.31	$32,567.29
Conservative	Jacques Grenier	9,592	16.27	-0.86	$49,358.13
Green	Martial Toupin	1,144	1.94	-0.09	$3,832.69
Marxist–Leninist	Jean-Paul Bédard	196	0.33	–	–
Total valid votes/expense limit		58,947	100.0		$269,923.91
Total rejected ballots		1,175	1.95	–	
Turnout		60,122	65.29	–	
Eligible voters		92,086			
Source: Elections Canada

2011 federal election redistributed results
Party	Vote	%
New Democratic	22,777	41.28
Bloc Québécois	15,711	28.47
Conservative	9,452	17.13
Liberal	6,029	10.93
Green	1,120	2.03
Others	88	0.16

2011 Canadian federal election
Party	Candidate	Votes	%	±%
New Democratic	Lise St-Denis	18,628	39.1	+31.3
Bloc Québécois	Jean-Yves Laforest	13,961	29.3	-14.7
Conservative	Jacques Grenier	8,447	17.7	-6.2
Liberal	Yves Tousignant	5,670	11.9	-9.1
Green	Pierre Audette	972	2.0	-1.4
Total valid votes/expense limit		47,678	100.0	
Total rejected ballots		1,193	2.4	–
Turnout		48,871	60.8	–
Eligible voters		80,315	–	–

2008 Canadian federal election
Party	Candidate	Votes	%	±%	Expenditures
Bloc Québécois	Jean-Yves Laforest	20,397	44.0	-0.6	$57,864
Conservative	Stéphane Roof	11,083	23.9	-9.1	$65,544
Liberal	Ronald St-Onge Lynch	9,755	21.0	+9.5	$1,857
New Democratic	Anne Marie Aubert	3,601	7.8	+0.3	
Green	Martial Toupin	1,562	3.4	-0.2	$2,629
Total valid votes/expense limit		46,398	100.0	$99,633	

2006 Canadian federal election
Party	Candidate	Votes	%	±%	Expenditures
Bloc Québécois	Jean-Yves Laforest	21,532	44.3	-11.0	$36,733
Conservative	Martial Toupin	16,028	33.0	+24.2	$13,342
Liberal	Lucille Whissell	5,612	11.6	-19.0	$14,587
New Democratic	Claude Larocque	3,684	7.6	+5.2	$1,524
Green	Pierre Cayou Audette	1,705	3.5	+1.7	$1,585
Total valid votes/expense limit		48,561	100.0	$93,422	

2004 Canadian federal election
Party	Candidate	Votes	%	±%	Expenditures
Bloc Québécois	Marcel Gagnon	25,918	55.3	–	$55,299
Liberal	Marie-Eve Bilodeau	14,320	30.6	–	$64,827
Conservative	Martial Toupin	4,129	8.8	–	$17,805
New Democratic	Pierre J.C. Allard	1,104	2.4	–	
Green	Pierre Cayou Audette	855	1.8	–	$7.58
Marijuana	Paul Giroux	547	1.2	–	
Total valid votes/expense limit		46,873	100.0	$91,967	

== See also ==
- List of Canadian electoral districts
- Mauricie
- Historical federal electoral districts of Canada
