= Lise St-Denis =

Canadian politician

Member of Parliament for Saint-Maurice—Champlain
- In office May 2, 2011 – August 4, 2015
- Preceded by: Jean-Yves Laforest
- Succeeded by: François-Philippe Champagne

Personal details
- Born: April 18, 1940 (age 86) Montreal, Quebec, Canada
- Party: Liberal Party (2012–present)
- Other political affiliations: New Democratic Party (2008–2012)
- Profession: Teacher

Lise St-Denis (born April 18, 1940) is a former Canadian politician. She was elected to the House of Commons of Canada in the 2011 election and served a single term. She was elected in the electoral district of Saint-Maurice—Champlain as a member of the New Democratic Party, but crossed the floor to the Liberal Party of Canada on January 10, 2012, saying in French to explain her move: "Voters voted for Jack Layton. Jack Layton is dead."

Prior to being elected, St-Denis was a teacher. She has bachelor's and master's degrees in Quebec literature and education. She previously ran as the New Democratic Party's candidate in Longueuil—Pierre-Boucher in the 2008 election, losing to Jean Dorion of the Bloc Québécois.

Shortly after her election, St-Denis was diagnosed with non-Hodgkin's lymphoma. She did not stand for re-election in 2015.

Before joining the Liberals, St-Denis supported Thomas Mulcair as the next leader of the NDP.

== Electoral history ==
=== Saint-Maurice—Champlain ===
2011 Canadian federal election
Party	Candidate	Votes	%	±%	Expenditures
New Democratic	Lise St-Denis	18,628	39.1	+31.3	
Bloc Québécois	Jean-Yves Laforest	13,961	29.3	-14.7	
Conservative	Jacques Grenier	8,447	17.7	-6.2	
Liberal	Yves Tousignant	5,670	11.9	-9.1	
Green	Pierre Audette	972	2.0	-1.4	
Total valid votes/Expense limit		47,678	100.0		
Total rejected ballots		1,193	2.4	–	
Turnout		48,871	60.8	–	
Eligible voters		80,315	–	–	

=== Longueuil—Pierre-Boucher ===
2008 Canadian federal election
Party	Candidate	Votes	%	±%	Expenditures
Bloc Québécois	Jean Dorion	23,118	46.1	-9.1	$49,818
Liberal	Ryan Hillier	10,920	21.8	+9.2	$10,797
Conservative	Jacques Bouchard	7,210	14.4	-4.4	$55,552
New Democratic	Lise St-Denis	7,021	14.0	+5.4	$1,131
Green	Danielle Moreau	1,752	3.5	-0.5	
Marxist–Leninist	Serge Patenaude	103	0.2	–	
Total valid votes/Expense limit		50,124	100.0	$83,504	
Total rejected ballots		682	1.34		
Turnout		50,806			
