= 2015 Canadian federal election =

- October 19, 2015

338 seats in the House of Commons 170 seats needed for a majority
- Opinion polls
- Turnout: 68.3% (▲7.2 pp)
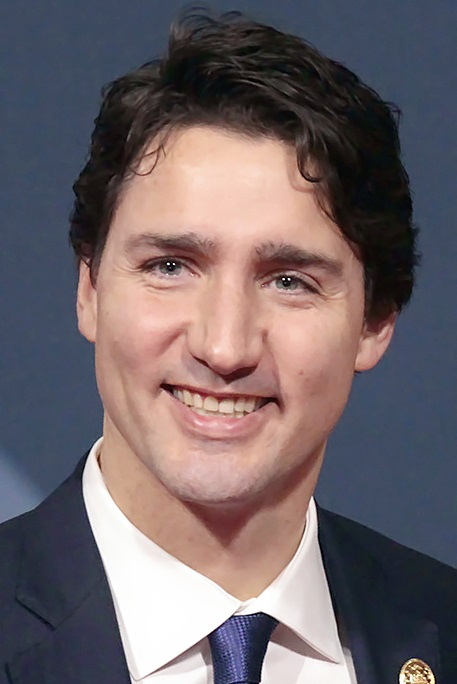

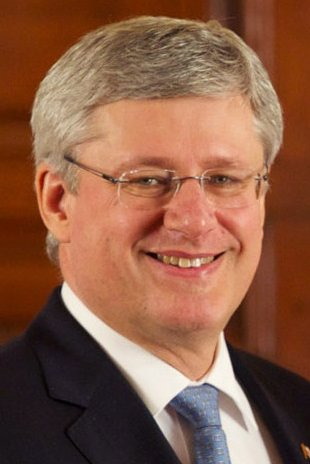

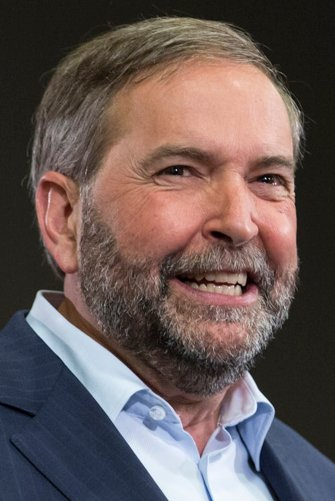

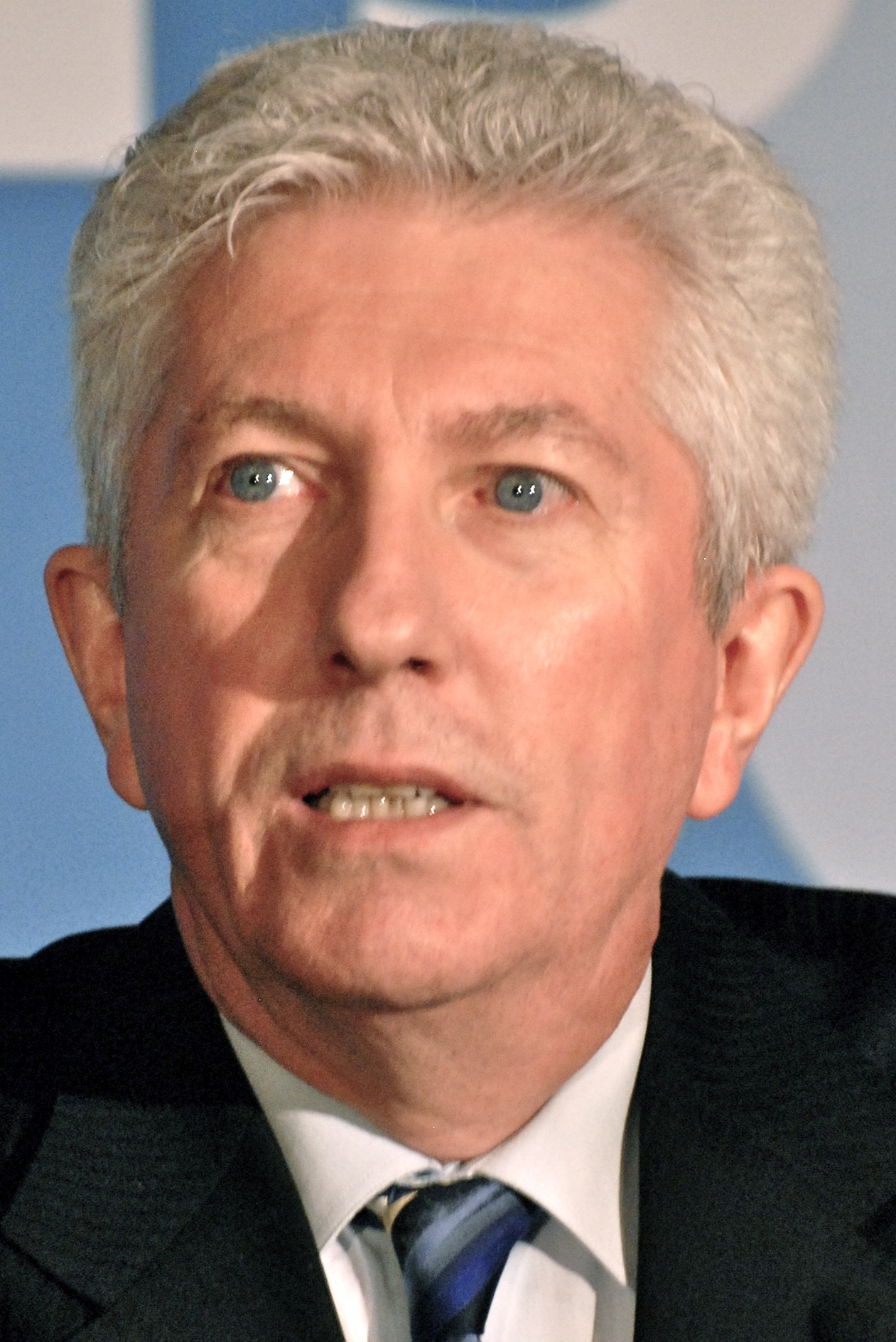

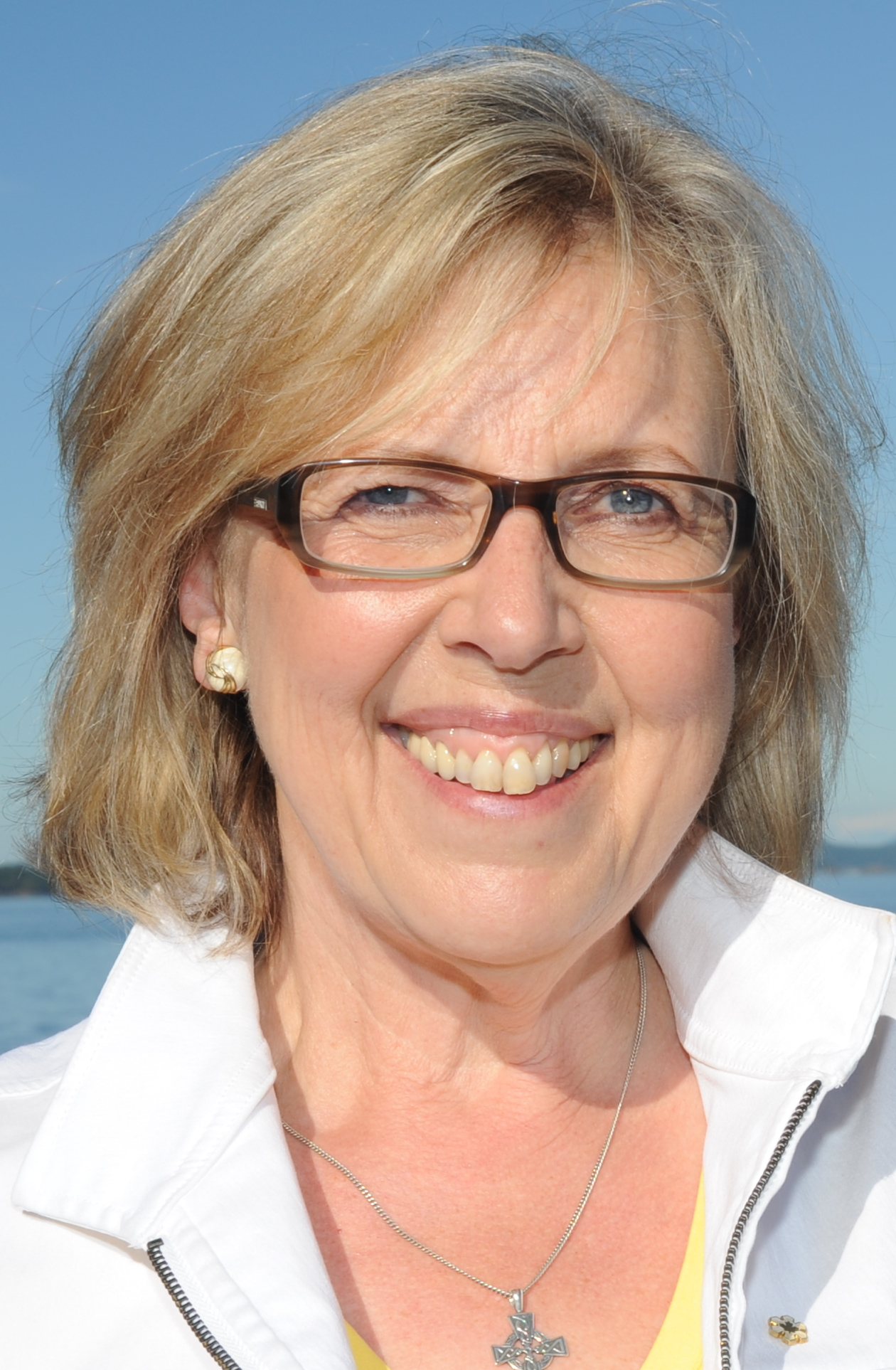
	First party	Second party	Third party
Leader	Justin Trudeau	Stephen Harper	Tom Mulcair
Party	Liberal	Conservative	New Democratic
Leader since	April 14, 2013	March 20, 2004	March 24, 2012
Leader's seat	Papineau	Calgary Heritage	Outremont
Last election	34 seats, 18.91%	166 seats, 39.62%	103 seats, 30.63%
Seats before	36	159	95 (Note: Includes José Núñez-Melo, who sat as a member of the NDP at the dissolution of Parliament, but ran as a Green Party candidate in the 2015 election. Does not include Maria Mourani, who sat as an independent at the dissolution of Parliament, but ran as an NDP candidate in the 2015 election.)
Seats won	184	99	44
Seat change	▲148	▼60	▼51
Popular vote	6,942,937	5,613,633	3,469,368
Percentage	39.47%	31.91%	19.72%
Swing	▲20.56 pp	▼7.71 pp	▼10.91 pp
	Fourth party	Fifth party
Leader	Gilles Duceppe	Elizabeth May
Party	Bloc Québécois	Green
Leader since	June 10, 2015 (Note: Appointed as leader without a leadership election.)	August 27, 2006
Leader's seat	Ran in Laurier—Sainte-Marie (lost)	Saanich—Gulf Islands
Last election	4 seats, 6.04%	1 seat, 3.91%
Seats before	2	2 (Note: Does not include José Núñez-Melo, who sat as a member of the NDP at the dissolution of Parliament, but ran as a Green Party candidate in the 2015 election)
Seats won	10	1
Seat change	▲8	▼1
Popular vote	821,144	602,933
Percentage	4.67%	3.43%
Swing	▼1.38 pp	▼0.49 pp
Prime Minister before election
Stephen Harper
Conservative
Prime Minister after election
Justin Trudeau
Liberal

The 2015 Canadian federal election was held on October 19, 2015, to elect the 338 members of the House of Commons of the 42nd Parliament of Canada. In accordance with the maximum four-year term under a 2007 amendment to the Canada Elections Act, the writs of election for the 2015 election were issued by Governor General David Johnston on August 2. At 11 weeks, the ensuing campaign was one of the longest in Canadian history: It was also the first time since 1979 that a prime minister attempted to remain in office into a fourth consecutive Parliament and the first time since 1980 that someone attempted to win a fourth term of any kind as prime minister. (Note: In both cases, it was Pierre Trudeau, father of 2015 winner Justin Trudeau, who attempted in 1979 to win a 4th consecutive term and succeeded in 1980 in winning a fourth term overall. He joined John A. Macdonald (four consecutive) and Wilfrid Laurier (four consecutive) as the only four-time Canadian prime ministers.) This is also the most recent election in which a majority government was formed. (Note: The April 2025 election result did not form a majority government; following the general election, a series of floor crossings and byelections would make it a majority government in April 2026.)

The Liberal Party won 184 seats, forming a majority government with its leader Justin Trudeau becoming prime minister. Trudeau and the rest of his cabinet were sworn in on November 4, 2015. The Conservative Party, led by incumbent Prime Minister Stephen Harper, won 99 seats, becoming the Official Opposition after nearly a decade on the government benches. The New Democratic Party, led by Tom Mulcair, won 44 seats, becoming the third-largest party in the House of Commons, after having formed the Official Opposition following the 2011 election. The Bloc Québécois won 10 seats, the Green Party won 1 seat, and Strength in Democracy lost all its seats.

The Liberal Party's increase of 148 seats from the previous election was the largest-ever numerical increase by a party in a Canadian election. Prior to the campaign, the Liberals had held only 36 seats—the fewest seats ever held at dissolution by any federal party that won the following election. The Liberals also became the first federal party in Canadian history to win a majority of seats without having been either the governing party or the Official Opposition in the previous parliament, and this was only the second time a party went from having the third-most seats to the most seats (the first being in 1925). It was the second largest number of seats won in a federal election for the Liberals, the best being 191 in 1949. This was the first election since 2000 in which the Liberals gained seats. It was also the first election since 1980 in which the Liberals won the most seats in Quebec, and the first election since 1968 in which the Liberals won the most seats in British Columbia. The election also had the highest voter turnout since 1993. Every party represented in the House of Commons except the Liberal Party recorded a decrease in its popular vote share. There was an increase in voter turnout among all age groups. The largest was among eligible voters aged 18 to 24, which increased 18.3 points, to 57.1%. Elections Canada reported that this was the biggest increase in turnout among this age group since it began making demographic turnout estimates.

Following the election, Harper conceded defeat to Trudeau and resigned as leader of the Conservative Party. Gilles Duceppe resigned as leader of the Bloc Québécois shortly after the election on October 22, 2015. Tom Mulcair announced his intention to remain leader of the NDP, but was forced to step down in October 2017, after losing a party vote on his leadership in the spring of 2016.

== Background ==
The 2011 federal election resulted in the continuation of the incumbent Conservative government headed by Stephen Harper, while the New Democratic Party (NDP) became Official Opposition and the Liberal Party became the third party. The Bloc Québécois won four seats and the Green Party won one seat. Liberal leader Michael Ignatieff and Bloc leader Gilles Duceppe resigned shortly after failing to win their own ridings. The Bloc Québécois lost official party status by failing to attain the minimum seats needed (12).

Bob Rae was chosen as interim leader of the Liberal Party. In July 2011 Jack Layton, suffering from cancer, temporarily stepped down as leader of the NDP because of illness, indicating his intention to return for the reconvening of Parliament in September. Weeks later Layton died of cancer and was given a state funeral. In March 2012 Tom Mulcair was elected leader of the New Democratic Party. In April 2013 Justin Trudeau was elected leader of the Liberal Party. Bloc Québécois leader Daniel Paillé stepped down in December 2013 and was eventually replaced in June 2014 by Mario Beaulieu, who in turn was replaced by Duceppe in June 2015. In late 2014, MPs Jean-François Larose of the NDP and Jean-François Fortin of the Bloc formed the new political party Strength in Democracy. As set forth in the Fair Representation Act, the number of seats in the House of Commons to be contested in the 42nd Canadian federal election was 338, an increase of 30 seats from the 308 seats comprising the House of Commons of Canada of the 41st Parliament of Canada, at its dissolution.

Prime Minister Stephen Harper requested writs of election for a federal general election from Governor General David Johnston on August 2. The official proclamations were issued on August 4. The date of the vote is determined by the fixed-date Canada Elections Act. At 11 weeks, the campaign was the longest in modern Canadian history. As a result of the 2012 federal electoral redistribution, the number of electoral districts was increased to 338, with additional seats based on population assigned to Alberta (6), British Columbia (6), Ontario (15), and Quebec (3).

Effect of 2012 redistribution on notional number of seats held
Party	2011 (election)	New seats	Merged seat	Adjt +	Adjt -	2011 (redistributed)
Liberal	34	2		2	(2)	36
Conservative	166	23	(1)	4	(4)	188
New Democratic	103	6		4	(4)	109
Bloc Québécois	4			1	(1)	4
Green	1					1
Total	308	31	(1)	11	(11)	338

The transposed results of the 2011 election, if they had taken place under the 2013 Representation Order

Notional seats by party by province
Party	BC	AB	SK	MB	ON	QC	NB	PE	NS	NL	Territories	Total
Conservative	28	33	11	11	83	5	8	1	4	2	2	188
New Democratic	11	1	2	3	24	61	1		3	2	1	109
Liberal	2		1		14	8	1	3	4	3		36
Bloc Québécois						4						4
Green	1											1
Total	42	34	14	14	121	78	10	4	11	7	3	338

61 MPs chose to not seek reelection at the 2015 federal election, meaning they were Members of Parliament (MPs) in the 41st Parliament of Canada, but chose not to stand for election to the 42nd Parliament of Canada (in some cases after being deselected by their parties).

== Campaign slogans ==
Party	English	French	Translation of French (unofficial)
Conservative Party	"Proven leadership for a strong Canada." "Safer Canada/Stronger Economy" "Protect our Economy"	"Un leadership qui a fait ses preuves pour une économie plus forte"	"Leadership that has proven itself for a stronger economy"
New Democratic Party	"Ready for Change."	"Ensemble pour le changement"	"Together for change"
Liberal Party	"Real Change (Now)."	"Changer ensemble (maintenant)"	"Change together (now)"
Bloc Québécois	—N/a	"Des gains pour le Québec" "On a tout à gagner"	"Gains for Quebec" "We have everything to win"
Green Party	"A Canada That Works. Together."	"Prendre l'avenir en main"	"Take the future in hand"

== Election campaign ==
=== Leaders' debates ===
Traditionally, party leaders participated in at least two nationally televised debates during the federal election – at least one each in English and French. These debates were produced by a consortium of Canada's major television networks. In May 2015, the Conservatives said they would not participate in the consortium debates and instead would take part in as many as five independently staged debates in the run-up to the fall federal election. Ultimately, the Conservatives agreed to participate in a French-language debate organized by the consortium of broadcasters as one of their five debates. The New Democratic Party confirmed that Tom Mulcair would accept every debate where the prime minister was present. The NDP had previously confirmed its intention to participate in both of the consortium debates before Stephen Harper withdrew but ultimately only participated in the French language consortium debate which included the Conservatives. Liberal leader Justin Trudeau attended the Maclean's, Globe and Mail, and French consortium debates; and the Liberals confirmed he would attend the other debates. The Bloc Québécois attended the French language consortium debate and confirmed its attendance at the French-language TVA debate. The Green Party attended the Maclean's and French language consortium debates, and confirmed its intention to participate in the English language consortium debate. Strength in Democracy, which had the same number of seats in the House of Commons at dissolution as the Greens and Bloc Québécois, were not invited to participate in any of the televised debates. The leaders of the party objected to their exclusion and launched a petition demanding that all parties represented in Parliament be invited to the debates. Other minor parties without representation in the House of Commons were not invited to participate in any of the televised debates.

Televised debates
Subject	Participants	Date	Organizer	Moderator	Location	Notes
General	Harper, May, Mulcair, Trudeau	August 6	Rogers Media (Maclean's)	Paul Wells	Toronto	The debate included live translations into French, Italian, Mandarin, Cantonese and Punjabi. Aired live on City stations (English), CPAC (French), and Omni Television stations (all other languages); streamed live at the Maclean's website and all networks' websites, Facebook and YouTube; and on Rogers Media news radio stations.
Economy	Harper, Mulcair, Trudeau	September 17	The Globe and Mail and Google Canada	David Walmsley	Calgary	The first half of the 90-minute debate covered five central themes on the economy: jobs, energy and the environment, infrastructure, housing and taxation. The second half consisted of follow-up questions and questions sent in by voters. Aired live nationwide on CPAC in both official languages with an additional English feed in Ontario on CHCH, streamed live on The Globe and Mail's website, and distributed on YouTube. Uninvited Green Party leader Elizabeth May answered questions on Twitter live during the debate at an event in Victoria, British Columbia.
General	Duceppe, Harper, May, Mulcair, Trudeau	September 24	Consortium (CBC/Radio-Canada, CTV, Global, Télé-Québec) and La Presse	Anne-Marie Dussault	Montreal	The debate included live translation into English. Aired live in French on Ici Radio-Canada Télé and Télé-Québec stations, and participant networks' websites; and in English on CBC News Network, CTV News Channel, and participant networks' websites.
Foreign Policy	Harper, Mulcair, Trudeau	September 28	Aurea Foundation and Facebook Canada	Rudyard Griffiths	Toronto	Bilingual debate on Canada's foreign policy hosted as part of the foundation's regular Munk Debates. The debate consisted of six 12-minute segments, with two leaders debating for the first seven minutes and the third leader brought in to the debate for the final five. Aired on CPAC in both official languages with an additional English feed in Ontario on CHCH, streamed live on the Munk Debates website, and distributed on Facebook.
General	Duceppe, Harper, Mulcair, Trudeau	October 2	Quebecor Media (TVA)	Pierre Bruneau	Montreal	The debate focused on three themes: the economy, national security and Canada's place in the world, and social policies; the format consisted of six rounds of four-minute debate between two leaders, with an open debate section at the end of each theme. Aired live in French on TVA stations, Le Canal Nouvelles, and streamed on the TVA Nouvelles website; Aired with simultaneous interpretation to English on CPAC.

=== Controversies ===
The second Canadian federal election to significantly incorporate social media, the 2015 campaign was notable for the rise of new avenues of scrutiny for potential candidates. A number of damaging revelations for each of the major political parties late in the campaign led to calls for increased vetting amongst political strategists, academics and outside observers.

Party	Description
Conservative	August 7, 2015: Hochelaga candidate Augustin Ali Kitoko was removed as a candidate after sharing a Facebook photo album from New Democrat leader Tom Mulcair.; August 21, 2015: Rosemont—La Petite-Patrie candidate Gilles Guibord was no longer a candidate after a number of online comments on Le Journal de Montréal were uncovered, including blaming First Nations for not integrating into European culture, claiming the French, not the Mohawks, have ancestral rights to Quebec, and speaking about man's "authority over women".; August 24, 2015: Ahuntsic-Cartierville candidate Wiliam Moughrabi deleted his Facebook account after violent and sexist posts were discovered.; August 25, 2015: Joliette candidate Soheil Eid apologized after comparing New Democrat leader Tom Mulcair's statements regarding the Energy East pipeline project to Nazi propagandist Joseph Goebbels by quoting "Mentez mentez, il en restera toujours quelque chose" ("Lie lie and something will always remain").; September 6, 2015: Scarborough—Rouge Park candidate Jerry Bance was dropped from the party after a video from CBC's Marketplace surfaced showing an appliance repairman named Jerry urinating into a mug in a client's kitchen. It was later discovered that it was Bance himself. It became a popular meme on Twitter under the hashtag #peegate.; September 7, 2015: Toronto—Danforth candidate Tim Dutaud was forced to resign his candidacy after it was discovered he was YouTube user UniCaller, who has uploaded videos of himself pretending to orgasm while on the phone with female customer service representatives, and mocking people with mental disabilities.; September 8, 2015: Bay of Quinte Conservative Electoral District Association board member Sue MacDonell was fired after she posted on Facebook that Cree woman and newly crowned Mrs. Universe Ashley Callingbull-Burnham was a "monster" and a "smug entitled Liberal pet."; September 15, 2015: Bonavista—Burin—Trinity candidate Blair Dale was removed from his candidacy after racist and sexist online comments surfaced, including saying that abortion should not be an option for "irresponsible" people.; September 17, 2015: Prime Minister Stephen Harper's use of the appellation "Old Stock Canadians" during a nationally televised debate with Liberal Leader Justin Trudeau, and NDP Leader Tom Mulcair created a Twitter frenzy and substantial media coverage. Without specifically repeating the phrase, Harper later claimed to be referring to Canadians whose families have been here for "one or more generations".; October 1, 2015: Sackville—Preston—Chezzetcook candidate Robert Strickland was lambasted after Facebook remarks made by Strickland (or a staffer) told a young voter to "gain some experience in life" before engaging in political discussions.; October 1, 2015: St. Catharines incumbent Rick Dykstra was alleged to have purchased six Cîroc vodka bottles for underage girls at a local nightclub and then had his campaign offer bribes in exchange for their silence, a charge Dykstra denied.; October 6, 2015: Mississauga—Malton candidate Jagdish Grewal was dropped from the party after an editorial by Grewal was printed in the Punjabi Post titled "Is it wrong for a homosexual to become a normal person?" in which he defended gay-conversion therapy to return gay youths to their "normal" heterosexuality. He remained on the ballot.; October 10, 2015: The Economist said that "Muslim-bashing" had entered the election campaign, led primarily by the Conservatives, through the issue of the public wearing of the niqab. See also: Zunera Ishaq
NDP	August 10, 2015: Kings—Hants candidate Morgan Wheeldon resigned his candidacy after a Facebook comment surfaced where he is accused of saying Israel intended to "ethnically cleanse the region".; September 8, 2015: Shawn Dearn, Tom Mulcair's director of communications apologized after tweets came to light criticizing the Catholic Church, including stating that the "misogynist, homophobic, child-molesting Catholic church" is no moral authority, and used an expletive to refer to Pope Benedict XVI after the pope denounced Britain's gay equality rights.; September 20, 2015: NDP Leader Tom Mulcair was forced to apologize for using the term "Newfie" in a derogatory fashion as a synonym for "stupid" during a heated exchange in the Quebec legislature in 1996.; September 21, 2015: Winnipeg Centre MP Pat Martin apologized for offensive language. Martin called Green Party candidate Don Woodstock a "son of a bitch" during a candidates debate the previous week. In a Huffington Post article, Martin was quoted as saying Liberal candidate Robert-Falcon Ouellette is a "political slut" because he had considered running for different political parties before running for the Liberals.; September 22, 2015: Hamilton West—Ancaster—Dundas candidate Alex Johnstone apologized for Facebook comments from seven years prior, where she commented on photos of the Auschwitz concentration camp with "Ahhh, the infamous Pollish [sic], phallic, hydro posts." She claimed to not know that the picture was of the infamous concentration camp.; September 24, 2015: Charleswood—St. James—Assiniboia—Headingley candidate Stefan Johansson was asked to step down as candidate after social media posts from three years earlier emerged where he compared the Haredim sect of Judaism to the Taliban and other extremists.; October 7, 2015: Brampton East candidate Harbaljit Singh Kahlon, who once told a television programme same-sex marriage could lead to polygamy and public nudity, offered an apology and said he no longer held those views.
Liberal	August 18, 2015: Calgary Nose Hill candidate Ala Buzreba stepped down as candidate after offensive Twitter tweets from several years earlier were uncovered, including "Go blow your brains out you waste of sperm" and "Your mother should have used that coat hanger."; September 10, 2015: South Surrey—White Rock candidate Joy Davies resigned her candidacy after Facebook comments surfaced where she suggested that marijuana reduced family violence, that growing marijuana in a home poses no harm to children, and that the Canadian Cancer Society was "another outlet for big pharma."; September 10, 2015: Peace River—Westlock candidate Chris Brown apologized for offensive tweets he made in December 2009, during a bout of alcoholism after the death of his wife.; September 16, 2015: Sturgeon River—Parkland candidate Chris Austin had his candidacy removed because of views that "are irreconcilable with the values" of the Liberals, including saying Stephen Harper "has turned our Nation's Capital into a War Zone as his thirst for War" in the aftermath of the Parliament Hill shootings, and suggesting that the RCMP are the "Canadian Gestapo."; September 28, 2015: Cowichan—Malahat—Langford candidate Maria Manna resigned her candidacy after Facebook comments surfaced questioning the events of the September 11 attacks.; September 30, 2015: Victoria candidate Cheryl Thomas resigned after past social media posts came to light, including referring to mosques as "brainwashing stations" and saying "the oppressed of the Warsaw ghettos and the concentration camps have become the oppressors." As the candidate deadline (September 28) had already passed, her name remained on the ballot.; October 14, 2015: Dan Gagnier, a co-chair of the Liberal Party's national campaign, stepped down from his position after the reveal of an email indicating he had provided advice to TransCanada on how to lobby a potential Liberal government regarding energy issues.
BQ	Late August 2015: Mégantic—L'Érable candidate Virginie Provost was embarrassed after a survey asking what she would need in the event of a nuclear attack was revealed. Her answer was that she would bring "her cellphone, a penis and chips".; September 19, 2015: Ville-Marie—Le Sud-Ouest—Île-des-Sœurs candidate Chantal St-Onge apologized after sharing an anti-Islam Pegida post on Facebook.

== Opinion polls ==

Evolution of voting intentions during the campaign leading up to the 2015 Canadian federal election to be held on October 19, 2015. Points represent results of individual polls.

== Election spending ==
Before the campaign, there were no limits to what a political party, candidate, or third party (corporations, unions, special interest groups, etc.) can spend: spending rules are only in force after the writs have been dropped and the campaign has begun. Because the election period is set longer than the standard 37-day election period, spending limits are increased in proportion to the length of the period.

Party spending limits and actual spending, 2015 vs 2011
Type	Spending limits		2015						2011					
Type	2015	2011	Conservative		NDP		Liberal		Conservative		NDP		Liberal	
Type	2015	2011	Amount	%	Amount	%	Amount	%	Amount	%	Amount	%	Amount	%
Political party	$54,475,840	$21,025,793	$29,000,000		$28,000,000		$26,000,000		$19,519,995	93%	$20,372,231	97%	$19,507,746	93%
Party candidates	$73,611,590	$28,244,499	$21,000,000		$11,000,000		$15,000,000		$19,655,136	70%	$7,117,962	25%	$14,517,363	41%
Total	$128,087,430	$49,270,292							$39,175,131	80%	$27,490,193	56%	$34,025,109	69%
Candidates spending > 75% of limit									173		44		91	
Candidates spending > 50% of limit									228		70		169	

=== Reimbursements for political parties and candidates ===
Political parties receive a reimbursement for 50 per cent of their election expenses during the writ period. Similarly, candidates (through their official agents) receive a reimbursement of 60 per cent of their election expenses during the writ period. Both reimbursements are publicly funded.

=== Fundraising ===
Elections Canada reports that during the financial quarter preceding the writ period, the Conservatives received $7.4 million in contributions, the NDP received $4.5 million, and the Liberals received $4.0 million. The NDP had the most individual donors at 48,314, followed by the Conservatives at 45,532 and then the Liberals at 32,789.

The New Democratic Party stated that it collected greater than $9 million in the third quarter of 2015, the most it ever received from donors, and greater than the quarterly record established by the Conservative Party in 2011.

At the riding level, financial reports in each of the 338 constituencies showed that in Conservative electoral district associations ended 2014 with net assets totalling more than $19 million, Liberal riding associations reported a total of about $8 million in net assets, and NDP associations more than $4.4 million.

Individuals are able to give up to $1,500 to each political party and an additional $1,500 to all the registered associations, nomination contestants and candidates of each registered party combined.

=== Registered third parties ===
A person or group must register as a third party immediately after incurring election advertising expenses totalling $500 or more. There are strict limits on advertising expenses, and specific limits that can be incurred to promote or oppose the election of one or more candidates in a particular electoral district. There were 112 registered third parties in the 2015 election. There was a $150,000 election advertising expenses limit. Of that amount, no more than $8,788 could be incurred to promote or oppose the election of one or more candidates in a particular electoral district.

== Results ==
Cartogram of the 2015 Canadian federal election results

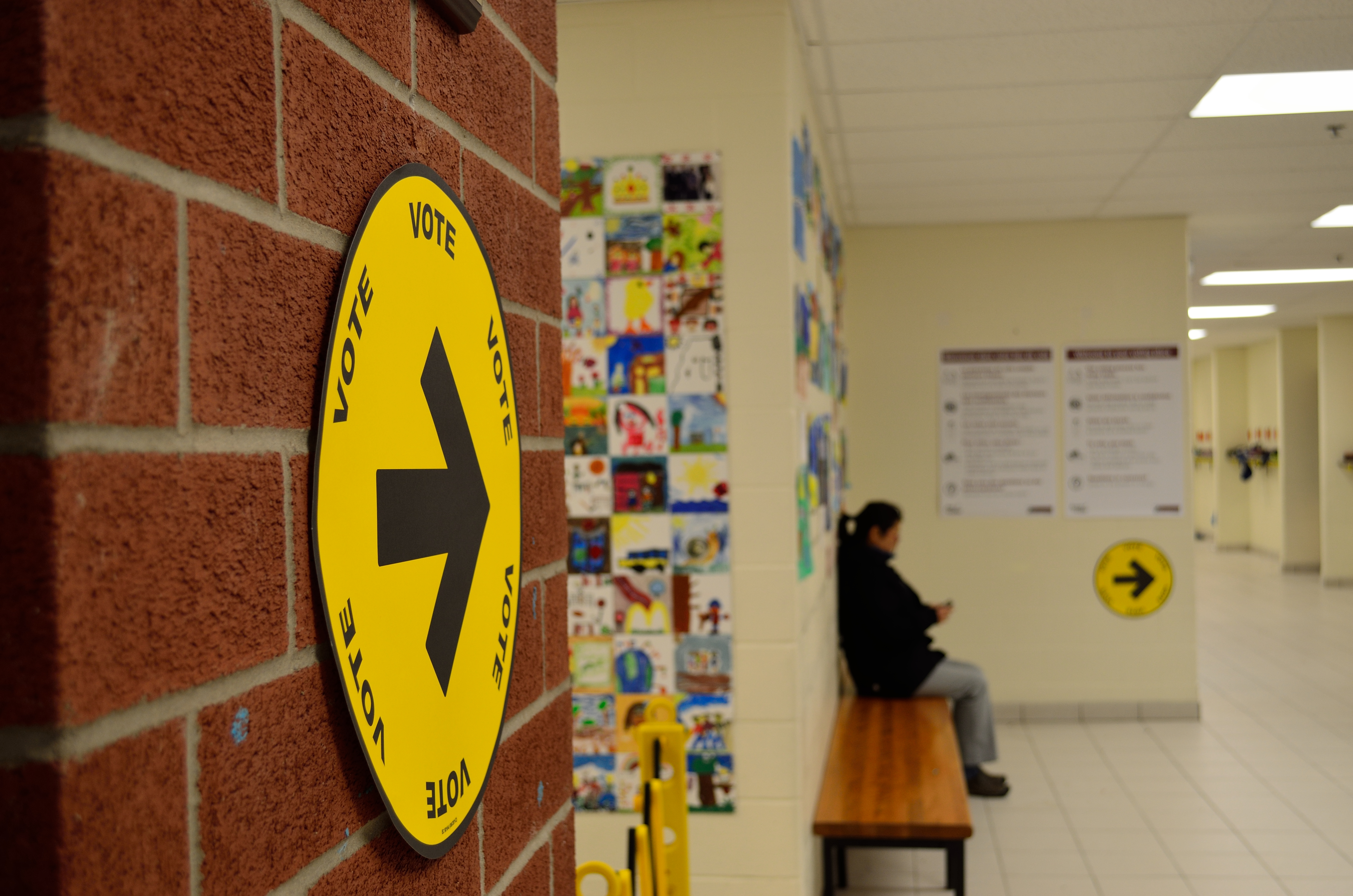
A polling station on election day

Summary of the 2015 Canadian federal election
Party	Party leader	Candidates	Seats						Popular vote				
Party	Party leader	Candidates	2011	Dissol.	Redist. (Note: The party totals are theoretical. They are the transposition of the 2011 district results redistributed to the new districts formed in 2015.)	2015	% change from 2011	% seats	Votes	Vote change	%	pp change	% where running
Liberal	Justin Trudeau	338 (Note: Includes Liberal candidate Cheryl Thomas from Victoria, who publicly withdrew from the election after the final list of candidates was released and thus remained on the ballot as the Liberal candidate.)	34	36	36	184	+441.18%	54.44%	6,942,937	+4,159,861	39.47%	+20.57pp	39.47%
Conservative	Stephen Harper	338 (Note: Includes Conservative candidate Jagdish Grewal from Mississauga—Malton, who was expelled by the Conservative Party after the final list of candidates was released and thus remained on the ballot as the Conservative candidate.)	166	159	188	99	-40.36%	29.29%	5,613,633	−221,637	31.91%	−7.72pp	31.91%
New Democratic	Tom Mulcair	338	103	95 (Note: Includes José Núñez-Melo, who sat as a member of the NDP at the dissolution of Parliament, but ran as a Green Party candidate in the 2015 election. Does not include Maria Mourani, who sat as an independent at the dissolution of Parliament, but ran as an NDP candidate in the 2015 election.)	109	44	-57.28%	13.02%	3,469,368	−1,043,043	19.72%	−10.92pp	19.73%
Bloc Québécois	Gilles Duceppe	78	4	2	4	10	+150%	2.96%	821,144	−70,281	4.67%	−1.39pp	19.36%
Green	Elizabeth May	336	1	2 (Note: Does not include José Núñez-Melo, who sat as a member of the NDP at the dissolution of Parliament, but ran as a Green Party candidate in the 2015 election)	1	1	0%	0.3%	602,933	+30,838	3.43%	−0.46pp	3.44%
Independent and No Affiliation		80	0	8 (Note: Includes Manon Perreault, who sat as an independent at the dissolution of Parliament, but ran as a Strength in Democracy candidate in the 2015 election. Includes Maria Mourani, who sat as an independent at the dissolution of Parliament, but ran as an NDP candidate in the 2015 election.)	0	0	0	0	49,616	−23,245	0.28%	−0.21pp	1.18%
Libertarian	Tim Moen	72	0	0	0	0	0	0	36,775	+30,773	0.21%	+0.17pp	0.93%
Christian Heritage	Rod Taylor	30	0	0	0	0	0	0	15,232	−3,678	0.09%	−0.04pp	0.97%
Marxist–Leninist	Anna Di Carlo	70	0	0	0	0	0	0	8,838	−1,087	0.05%	−0.02pp	0.23%
Strength in Democracy	Jean-François Fortin	17	—N/a	2 (Note: Does not include Montcalm MP Manon Perreault, who sat as an independent before the writ was dropped, after which she announced her candidacy for Strength in Democracy.)	—N/a	0	0	0	8,274	*	0.05%	*	0.90%
Rhinoceros	Sébastien Corriveau	27	0	0	0	0	0	0	7,263	+3,463	0.04%	+0.02pp	0.52%
Progressive Canadian	Sinclair Stevens	8	0	0	0	0	0	0	4,476	−1,314	0.03%	−0.01pp	1.03%
Communist	Miguel Figueroa	26	0	0	0	0	0	0	4,393	+1,499	0.02%	+0.01pp	0.32%
Animal Alliance	Liz White	8	0	0	0	0	0	0	1,699	+355	0.01%	–	0.36%
Marijuana	Blair Longley	8	0	0	0	0	0	0	1,557	−199	0.01%	–	0.34%
Democratic Advancement Party	Stephen Garvey	4	—N/a	0	—N/a	0	0	0	1,187	*	0.01%	*	0.62%
Pirate	Roderick Lim	5	0	0	0	0	0	0	908	−2,289	0.01%	−0.02pp	0.32%
Canadian Action	Jeremy Arney	3	0	0	0	0	0	0	401	−1,550	0.00%	−0.01pp	0.24%
Canada Party	Jim Pankiw	1	—N/a	0	—N/a	0	0	0	271	*	0.00%	*	0.72%
Seniors	Daniel J. Patton	1	—N/a	—N/a	—N/a	0	0	0	157	*	0.00%	*	0.29%
Alliance of the North	François Bélanger	1	—N/a	—N/a	—N/a	0	0	0	136	*	0.00%	*	0.22%
Bridge	David Berlin	1	—N/a	0	—N/a	0	0	0	122	*	0.00%	*	0.29%
PACT	Michael Nicula	1	—N/a	0	—N/a	0	0	0	91	*	0.00%	*	0.17%
United	Bob Kesic	1	0	0	0	0	0	0	57	−237	0.00%	−0.00pp	0.10%
Vacant			0	4	0	0	—N/a						
Total		1,792	308	308	338	338	+9.74%	100%	17,591,468	+2,870,888	100%		100%
Source: Elections Canada (Final results)

=== Analysis ===
Ternary plots - shift of electoral support (2011-2015)
2011

2015
Electoral districts identified by colours of winning parties

Popular vote
Liberal	39.47%
Conservative	31.91%
New Democratic	19.73%
Bloc Québécois	4.67%
Green	3.43%
Others	0.79%

Seat totals
Liberal	54.44%
Conservative	29.29%
New Democratic	13.02%
Bloc Québécois	2.96%
Green	0.3%

Elections to the 42nd Parliament of Canada – seats won/lost by party, 2011–2015
Party	2011 (redist.)	Gain from (loss to)					2015
Party	2011 (redist.)	Lib	Con	NDP	BQ	Grn	2015
Liberal	36		96	51	1		184
Conservative	188	(96)		(3)			99
New Democratic	109	(51)	3		(7)		44
Bloc Québécois	4	(1)		7			10
Green	1						1
Total	338	(148)	99	55	(6)		338

Swing analysis	Conservative to Liberal	NDP to Liberal	NDP to Conservative
Swing analysis	+14.15pp	+15.74pp	+1.60pp

=== Results by province ===
Party name		BC	AB	SK	MB	ON	QC	NB	NS	PE	NL	YT	NT	NU	Total
Liberal	Seats:	17	4	1	7	80	40	10	11	4	7	1	1	1	184
Liberal	Vote:	35.2	24.6	23.9	44.6	44.8	35.7	51.6	61.9	58.3	64.5	53.6	48.3	47.2	39.5
Conservative	Seats:	10	29	10	5	33	12	0	0	0	0	0	0	0	99
Conservative	Vote:	30.0	59.5	48.5	37.3	35.0	16.7	25.3	17.9	19.3	10.3	24.0	18.0	24.8	31.9
New Democratic	Seats:	14	1	3	2	8	16	0	0	0	0	0	0	0	44
New Democratic	Vote:	25.9	11.6	25.1	13.8	16.6	25.4	18.3	16.4	16.0	21.0	19.5	30.8	26.5	19.7
Bloc Québécois	Seats:	—N/a					10	—N/a							10
Bloc Québécois	Vote:	—N/a					19.3	—N/a							4.7
Green	Seats:	1	0	0	0	0	0	0	0	0	0	0	0	0	1
Green	Vote:	8.2	2.5	2.1	3.2	2.9	2.3	4.6	3.4	6.0	1.1	2.9	2.8	1.5	3.4
Independent and No Affiliation	Vote:	0.1	0.8	0.2	0.6	0.2	0.1	0.1	0.3		2.9				0.2
Total seats		42	34	14	14	121	78	10	11	4	7	1	1	1	338

=== Canadian Election Study ===
The 2015 CES included two survey components. Both included two waves of questions, one in the campaign period (CPS) and a recontact wave after the election (PES).

The non-probability online survey included a sample of Canadians from across the country (CPS n=11,614; PES n=6,554).

The following table is the indicated vote choice in the 2015 election, cross-tabbed with demographic questions. The weights have been adjusted to match the actual results of the election.

==== Demographics ====
Demographic Subgroup	LPC	CPC	NDP	BQC	GPC	Other	Sample
Total Vote	39.5	31.9	19.7	4.7	3.4	0.8	6,554
Gender
Men	36.6	35.7	18.8	4.8	2.9	1.2	3,083
Women	42.5	28.0	20.7	4.6	3.9	0.4	2,996
Age
18-29	45.7	22.1	23.7	2.6	4.2	1.7	762
30-39	43.9	26.9	22.1	4.1	2.9	0.0	963
40-49	39.1	33.4	18.1	4.9	4.3	0.3	929
50-59	37.2	32.7	20.1	5.7	3.1	1.2	1,225
60-69	36.4	34.2	18.8	6.3	3.1	1.2	1,300
70-79	37.0	40.0	16.2	3.6	2.7	0.5	665
80+	30.8	46.9	14.7	0.9	6.7	0.0	143
Language
English	41.5	35.5	18.1	0.2	3.9	0.7	4,868
French	31.4	17.4	26.1	22.6	1.5	1.0	1,216
Highest Education Attainment
High School or Less	38.0	32.4	19.7	5.5	3.4	1.0	2,495
College	35.9	36.0	19.8	4.2	2.9	1.2	1,299
University	43.1	29.1	19.7	4.0	3.7	0.4	2,221
Religion
Atheist	41.6	23.0	24.7	4.7	5.1	0.9	1,603
Agnostic	38.7	21.0	26.3	5.9	8.1	0.0	75
Buddhist	38.2	26.1	21.2	2.3	7.6	4.5	61
Hindu	63.8	27.5	8.7	0.0	0.0	0.0	39
Jewish	39.5	49.8	10.7	0.0	0.0	0.0	60
Muslim/Islam	76.5	9.4	13.4	0.0	0.7	0.0	84
Sikh	67.5	22.0	10.5	0.0	0.0	0.0	19
Christian	37.0	37.7	17.0	4.9	2.5	0.9	3,416
Catholic	40.4	27.9	19.6	9.6	1.8	0.7	1,606
Protestant & Other Christian	33.9	46.4	14.7	0.7	3.2	1.0	1,810
Other Religion	43.8	27.2	20.2	1.4	7.4	0.0	147
Ethnicity
White	38.4	32.4	19.8	5.1	3.5	0.8	5,462
East Asian	44.9	39.6	13.1	0.0	2.3	0.0	159
Hispanic	47.5	31.9	16.7	0.0	3.9	0.0	27
South Asian	53.1	30.5	15.3	1.0	0.0	0.0	67
Indigenous	49.0	22.2	23.2	0.5	5.0	0.0	129
Other	49.7	24.2	20.5	1.5	3.5	0.6	432
Income
0-30,000	37.1	25.2	24.9	7.1	4.6	1.1	889
30,001-60,000	38.8	29.7	21.7	5.5	3.7	0.4	1,514
60,001-90,000	38.8	32.9	19.9	4.5	2.8	1.1	1,277
90,001-110,000	43.0	32.1	18.0	4.0	2.5	0.3	614
>110,000	41.8	36.5	14.8	3.1	2.8	1.0	1,281
Home Ownership
Own	39.1	34.4	18.0	4.0	3.6	0.9	4,699
Rent	40.3	23.3	26.0	7.0	3.0	0.3	1,311
Marital Status
Married	39.4	38.4	15.2	2.9	3.2	0.9	3,042
Not Married	39.5	25.4	24.3	6.4	3.7	0.7	2,983
Employment
Working for pay	41.9	31.0	19.0	4.1	3.4	0.5	2,678
Self employed	33.2	38.5	18.3	3.5	4.1	2.4	478
Retired	36.3	35.0	18.8	5.9	3.4	0.5	1,604
Unemployed	40.9	24.4	24.2	6.3	2.5	1.7	244
Student	42.9	18.8	26.6	5.0	4.5	2.3	188
Caregiver/Homemaker	36.8	37.9	17.7	3.4	4.3	0.0	177
Disabled	42.5	26.6	24.4	3.4	3.0	0.0	219
Do you belong to a union?
Yes	42.3	24.5	24.4	5.2	2.9	0.7	1,087
No	38.6	34.3	18.5	4.4	3.6	0.5	3,992

== Student Vote results ==
Student votes are mock elections, running parallel to actual elections, in which students not of voting age participate. Student vote elections are administered by Student Vote Canada, and are for educational purposes and do not count towards the results. Note that the total seats adds up to 340 instead of 338, due to ties.

Summary of the 2015 Canadian Student Vote
Party	Leader	Seats		Popular vote	
Party	Leader	Elected	%	Votes	%
Liberal	Justin Trudeau	225	66.18	335,887	37.61
Conservative	Stephen Harper	71	20.88	232,033	25.98
New Democratic	Tom Mulcair	40	11.76	175,360	19.64
Green	Elizabeth May	4	1.18	107,431	12.03
Other		0	0	36,383	4.1
Bloc Québécois	Gilles Duceppe	0	0	5,924	0.66
Total		340*	100.00	893,018	100.00;

== Election aftermath ==
Pie chart detailing the percentage of seats won in the House of Commons

Hours after conceding defeat on election night, incumbent Prime Minister Stephen Harper resigned as leader of the Conservative Party, though he announced his intention to remain in the new parliament as a backbencher after being elected in the riding of Calgary Heritage. The Conservative caucus met on November 5, 2015, and elected former health minister and Alberta MP Rona Ambrose as interim leader of the party, and hence, interim Leader of the Official Opposition. The next Conservative Party of Canada leadership election was held on May 27, 2017. Following his swearing in on November 4, 2015, Prime Minister Justin Trudeau announced that parliament would reconvene on December 3, 2015, with the Speech from the Throne to follow on December 4.

=== Commentary ===
In the aftermath of the 2011 election, many pundits had characterized it as a realigning election. Lawrence Martin, commentator for The Globe and Mail said, "Harper has completed a remarkable reconstruction of a Canadian political landscape that endured for more than a century. The realignment saw both old parties of the moderate middle, the Progressive Conservatives and the Liberals, either eliminated or marginalized." Andrew Coyne, writing in Maclean's, said the election marked "an unprecedented realignment of Canadian politics" as "the Conservatives are now in a position to replace the Liberals as the natural governing party in Canada."

Despite the grim outlook and poor early poll numbers, when the 2015 election was held, the Liberals under Trudeau made an unprecedented comeback. Gaining 148 seats, they won a majority government for the first time since 2000. Chantal Hébert, writing in the Toronto Star, claimed the comeback was "headed straight for the history books" and that Harper's name would "forever be joined with that of his Liberal nemesis in Canada's electoral annals". Spencer McKay, writing for the National Post, suggested that "maybe we've witnessed a revival of Canada's 'natural governing party'".

=== International reactions ===
- China: Foreign Ministry Deputy Director and Spokeswoman Hua Chunying expressed hope on building on existing relations between Canada and China, stating "a sustainable and steady development of China–Canada relations" will benefit both countries.
- Germany: German Ambassador to Canada Werner Wnendt said that his government welcomed Trudeau's commitment to restoring a multilateral foreign policy and "the traditional voice that Canada has had at the UN has been missed".
- India: Prime Minister Narendra Modi congratulated Trudeau by telephone where he reminisced about meeting Trudeau's family, expressed hope for further improvement of Canada–India relations, and invited Trudeau to visit India.
- Italy: Prime Minister Matteo Renzi sent Trudeau a Twitter message wishing him luck and saying that he looked forward to them meeting at the 2015 G-20 Antalya summit.
- Mexico: President Enrique Peña Nieto congratulated Trudeau by telephone and tweeted that "Canada and Mexico have the opportunity to start a new chapter in their relationship".
- United States: President Barack Obama congratulated Trudeau on the result in a telephone call where the two discussed Canada–United States relations, the Trans-Pacific Partnership, and the 2015 climate change conference in Paris.

== Cabinet appointments ==
On November 4, 2015, the following individuals were sworn in as cabinet ministers of the 29th Canadian Ministry, in addition to Justin Trudeau as prime minister and minister of Intergovernmental Affairs and Youth:

- Public Safety: Ralph Goodale
- Agriculture and Agri-Food: Lawrence MacAulay
- Foreign Affairs: Stéphane Dion
- Immigration: John McCallum
- Indigenous and Northern Affairs: Carolyn Bennett
- President of the Treasury Board: Scott Brison
- Leader of the Government in the House of Commons: Dominic LeBlanc
- Innovation, Science and Economic Development: Navdeep Singh Bains
- Finance: Bill Morneau
- Minister of Justice and Attorney General: Jody Wilson-Raybould
- Public Services and Procurement: Judy Foote
- International Trade: Chrystia Freeland
- Health: Jane Philpott
- Families, Children and Social Development: Jean-Yves Duclos
- Transport: Marc Garneau
- International Development: Marie-Claude Bibeau
- Natural Resources: Jim Carr
- Canadian Heritage: Mélanie Joly
- Revenue: Diane Lebouthillier
- Veterans Affairs: Kent Hehr
- Environment and Climate Change: Catherine McKenna
- National Defence: Harjit Sajjan
- Employment, Workforce and Labour: MaryAnn Mihychuk
- Infrastructure and Communities: Amarjeet Sohi
- Democratic Institutions: Maryam Monsef
- Sports and Persons with Disabilities: Carla Qualtrough
- Fisheries, Oceans and the Canadian Coast Guard: Hunter Tootoo
- Science: Kirsty Duncan
- Status of Women: Patty Hajdu
- Small Business and Tourism: Bardish Chagger

== See also ==
- Fixed election dates in Canada
- List of Canadian federal general elections
- List of political parties in Canada
- Results by riding of the Canadian federal election, 2015
- 2011 Bloc Québécois leadership election
- 2012 New Democratic Party leadership election
- 2013 Liberal Party of Canada leadership election
- 2014 Bloc Québécois leadership election
- 2015 Canadian federal election in Quebec
