= McConville =

McConville or MacConville is a surname. Notable people with the surname include:

- Bernard McConville (1887–1961), American screenwriter
- Bobby McConville (born 1964), Scottish footballer
- Brendan McConville (born 1965), American historian
- Cameron McConville (born 1974), Australian racing driver
- Chloe McConville (born 1987), Australian cyclist
- David Gordon McConville (1910-1971), Scots born Architect
- Lt Col James McConville (1884-1969) Belfast-born Lieutenant Colonel in British Army
- James C. McConville (born 1959), United States Army general, 40th chief of staff of the United States Army
- Jean McConville (1934–1972), Irish murder victim
- John McConville (died 1849), Irish educator
- Joseph-Norbert-Alfred McConville (1839–1912), Canadian lawyer and politician
- Josh McConville, Australian actor
- Kelly McConville, American statistician
- Lewis Arthur McConville (1849–1882), Canadian lawyer and politician
- Oisín McConville (born 1975), Irish Gaelic footballer
- Paddy McConville (1902 – after 1932), Irish footballer
- Peter McConville (born 1958), Australian rules footballer
- Sean McConville (born 1989), English footballer
- Tommy McConville (born 1947), Irish footballer
- Tommy McConville (Australian footballer) (1901–1969), Australian rules footballer

The surname originates in Ulster, Ireland, being primarily found on the borderlands of County Armagh and Down, but also Antrim and Louth. It is an anglicisation of the Gaelic name MacConmhaoil which means 'son of the high chief', although other translations are noted. Variants include McConvill, Conwell and McConwell, an early spelling that was eventually replaced by McConville.

In December 1565, a party of Queen Elizabeth's troops seized the Franciscan priests Father Roger MacConvill and Father Connor MacWard, stripped them of their habits and flogged them through the streets of Armagh until they both 'died beneath the lash'. In 1590 Rorie, Edm.mcTirlagh and Gilduff McConwall are recorded in County Down. Ten McConville variants are found in the Census of the Fews, in South Armagh/Louth, in 1602. In the Irish Rebellion of 1641 Neece McConwell of Clanconnell, a boy, was chosen to inform Sir William Brownlow that he should surrender Lurgan. The Irish force, containing Neece, Patrick Duff McConwell and Donal Duff McConwell, later burnt Lurgan and murdered around sixteen English people there. In the same year Patrick Moder McConwall and Mortagh McConwall are recorded as Irish rebels in County Down. Six MacConvilles (MacConwells) from County Down were attainted in 1690, losing their lands after supporting King James II and VII in the Jacobite wars. In 1743 Hugh McConwell is recorded as a Franciscan Friar or priest in Balimascanlan, Louth.

A noted family of McConwells are said to have originated at Drum-macawale or Drumackawall, sited to the SE of Crossmaglen in Creggan Parish, Armagh. The name means Ridge of McConwell, although other sources say its McCalls or Campbell's ridge. A round fort is shown on OS maps from the 1830s, but it has been mostly destroyed. In around 1752 two brothers Owen McConwell (1709-1771) and Arthur Antony McConwell (1711-1809) are said to have left Creggan and settled in Ardrea or Artrea parish. Owen's son Henry Conwell (1748-1842) became Bishop of Philadelphia in 1820. The Rev Arthur Anthony Conwell, whose surname was McConwell in the 1740s, served as parish priest in Ardtrea from 1756 until his death in 1809. His gravestone inscription records that he fought at Culloden for Prince Charles Edward Stuart in 1746 and received sabre wounds on his face and breast.

In 1755 a Hugh McConwell is recorded in Virginia, US.

There are over 400 entries of the surname McConville on the Griffiths Valuation, a list of those who occupied property in Ireland between 1847 and 1864.

McConville's Bar in Portadown, formerly the Mandeville Arms, was rebuilt by the McConville family in the 1890s and its interior retains a series of timber snugs from this era. It is a listed building.
