= Maurice Breton =

Canadian politician

Member of the Canadian Parliament for Joliette—l'Assomption—Montcalm
- In office 1950–1958
- Preceded by: Georges-Émile Lapalme
- Succeeded by: Louis-Joseph Pigeon

Personal details
- Born: August 15, 1909 Joliette, Quebec, Canada
- Died: June 3, 2001 (aged 91)
- Party: Liberal
- Occupation: lawyer

Maurice Breton (August 15, 1909 – June 3, 2001) was a Canadian politician and lawyer. He was acclaimed after the resignation of Georges-Émile Lapalme to the House of Commons of Canada in a 1950 by-election as a member of the Liberal Party to represent the riding of Joliette—l'Assomption—Montcalm. He was re-elected in 1953 and 1957 and lost the election of 1958.
