= Charles Bazinet =

Canadian politician (1845–1916)

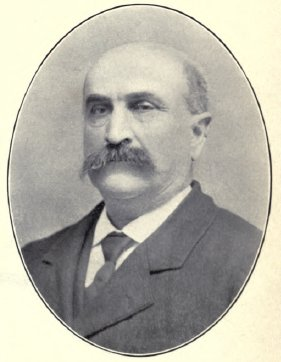

Member of the Canadian Parliament for Joliette
- In office 1896–1904
- Preceded by: Urbain Lippé
- Succeeded by: Joseph Adélard Dubeau

Personal details
- Born: July 20, 1845 Joliette, Canada East
- Died: March 3, 1916 (aged 70)
- Party: Liberal

Charles Bazinet (July 20, 1845 – March 3, 1916) was a Canadian politician who served in the House of Commons of Canada.

Born in Joliette, Canada East and educated at the Collège de Joliette, Bazinet was a lumber merchant by occupation and owned a sawmill. In 1867, he married Marie Philomene Courtois. He was first elected to the House of Commons for the electoral district of Joliette in the 1896 federal election. A Liberal, he was re-elected in 1900. Bazinet also served as mayor of St-Jean-de-Matha.
