= Lewis Arthur McConville =

Canadian politician (1849–1882)

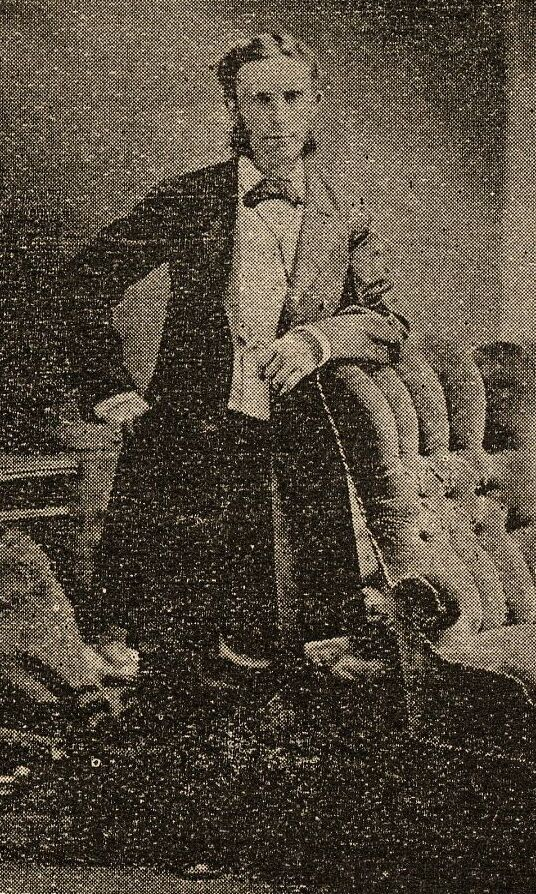
- Arthur McConville, 1893

Member of Parliament for Joliette
- In office 1880–1882
- Preceded by: Louis François Georges Baby
- Succeeded by: Édouard Guilbault

Personal details
- Born: 20 December 1849; Berthier, Canada East, Canada
- Died: 10 May 1882 (aged 32); Joliette, Quebec, Canada
- Political party: Conservative
- Spouse: Josephte-Antonine Tarieu de Lanaudière (m. 1878)
- Parents: John McConville (father); Mary McKay (mother)
- Relatives: Joseph-Norbert-Alfred McConville (brother)

Lewis Arthur McConville (20 December 1849 – 10 May 1882) was a lawyer, journalist and political figure in Quebec. He represented Joliette in the House of Commons of Canada from 1880 to 1882 as a Conservative member.

He was born in Berthier, Canada East (in what is now Saint-Paul, Quebec), the son of John McConville, an Irish immigrant, and Mary McKay. McConville was educated in Joliette and was admitted to the bar in 1871. He served as a member of the editorial staff for Le Nouveau Monde and founded L'Industrie at Joliette in 1876. In 1878, McConville married Josephte-Antonine Tarieu de Lanaudière, the daughter of a co-seigneur of Lavaltrie. He served on the municipal council for Joliette from 1879 to 1882. McConville was first elected to the House of Commons in an 1880 by-election held after Louis François Georges Baby was named to the Quebec Court of Appeal. He died in Joliette at the age of 32 after a short illness.

McConville's wife entered a convent two years after the death of her husband. His brother Joseph-Norbert-Alfred McConville served as a member of the Quebec provincial assembly.
