= René Laurin =

Canadian politician (1940–2023)

René Laurin MP

Mayor of Joliette
- In office 2001–2013
- Preceded by: Danielle Laferrière
- Succeeded by: Alain Beaudry

Member of Parliament for Joliette
- In office 25 October 1993 – 27 November 2000
- Preceded by: Gaby Larrivée
- Succeeded by: Pierre Paquette

Personal details
- Born: 4 February 1940 Joliette, Quebec, Canada
- Died: 21 January 2023 (aged 82) Joliette, Quebec, Canada
- Party: Bloc Québécois
- Profession: Teacher

René Laurin (4 February 1940 – 21 January 2023) was a Canadian politician who was a member of the House of Commons from 1993 to 2000.

Born in Joliette, Quebec, Laurin was a teacher in Joliette's public and secondary schools after receiving a certificate from Ignace-Bourget College in 1969. Previously, he received a Bachelor of Arts degree at Joliette Seminary, and a Bachelor of Science in Communication at École des Hautes Études commerciales de Montréal. Between 1969 and 1971 he was general director of the Nouvelle-Acanadie School Board in the Joliette district, after which he joined the Joliette School Board until 1993.

Laurin was elected in the Joliette electoral district under the Bloc Québécois party in the 1993 and 1997 federal elections, thus serving in the 35th and 36th Canadian Parliaments. Laurin did not seek a third term in Parliament and left Canadian politics in 2000. He then became mayor of Joliette, serving 12 years in that position until his retirement in 2013.

Laurin died on 21 January 2023, at the age of 82.

== Electoral record ==
1997 Canadian federal election: Joliette
| Party | Candidate | Votes | % | ±% | Expenditures |
|---|---|---|---|---|---|
| Bloc Québécois | René Laurin | 22,605 | 46.54 | | $58,632 |
| Progressive Conservative | Anie Perrault | 17,417 | 35.86 | | $27,044 |
| Liberal | Denise Cloutier Bergeron | 7,452 | 15.34 | – | $19,618 |
| Natural Law | Gilles Roy | 594 | 1.22 | | $707 |
| New Democratic | Jacques Trudeau | 502 | 1.03 | | $910 |
| Total valid votes | | 48,570 | 100.00 | | |
| Total rejected ballots | | 2,407 | | | |
| Turnout | | 50,977 | 73.56 | | |
| Electors on the lists | | 69,304 | | | |
Sources: Official Results, Elections Canada and Financial Returns, Elections Canada.
