= Joliette—L'Assomption—Montcalm =

Former federal electoral district in Quebec, Canada

Quebec electoral district

Defunct federal electoral district
- Legislature: House of Commons
- District created: 1933
- District abolished: 1967
- First contested: 1935
- Last contested: 1965

Joliette—L'Assomption—Montcalm (French pronunciation: [ʒɔljɛt lasɔ̃psjɔ̃ mɔ̃kalm]) was a federal electoral district in Quebec, Canada, that was represented in the House of Commons of Canada from 1935 to 1968.

This riding was created in 1933 from parts of Joliette and L'Assomption—Montcalm ridings.

It was initially defined to consist of:

- the county of Joliette including the city of Joliette;
- the county of L'Assomption; and
- the county of Montcalm, except the township of Archambault.

In 1947, it was redefined to consist of:

- the county of Joliette (except the township of Gouin), and the city of Joliette;
- the county of L'Assomption and the towns of L'Assomption and Laurentides;
- the county of Montcalm, except the townships of Brunet, Nantel and Pérodeau and the township of Archambault.

It was abolished in 1966 when it was redistributed into Berthier, Joliette, Labelle and Terrebonne ridings.

== Members of Parliament ==
This riding elected the following members of Parliament:

Parliament	Years	Member	Party
Joliette—L'Assomption—Montcalm; Riding created from Joliette and L'Assomption—Montcalm
18th	1935–1940	Charles-Édouard Ferland	Liberal
19th	1940–1945	Charles-Édouard Ferland	Liberal
20th	1945–1949	Georges-Émile Lapalme	Liberal
21st	1949–1950	Georges-Émile Lapalme	Liberal
21st	1950–1953	Maurice Breton	Liberal
22nd	1953–1957	Maurice Breton	Liberal
23rd	1957–1958	Maurice Breton	Liberal
24th	1958–1962	Louis-Joseph Pigeon	Progressive Conservative
25th	1962–1963	Louis-Joseph Pigeon	Progressive Conservative
26th	1963–1965	Louis-Joseph Pigeon	Progressive Conservative
27th	1965–1968	Joseph-Roland Comtois	Liberal
Riding dissolved into Berthier, Joliette, Labelle and Terrebonne

== Election results ==
1935 Canadian federal election
Party	Candidate	Votes
Liberal	Charles-Édouard Ferland	14,087
Reconstruction	François-Xavier-Romulus Joly	1,966
Conservative	Mario Forest	1,640

1940 Canadian federal election
Party	Candidate	Votes
Liberal	Charles-Édouard Ferland	14,112
National Government	Julien Lavallée	3,430

1945 Canadian federal election
Party	Candidate	Votes
Liberal	Georges-Émile Lapalme	14,810
Independent	Paul Brien	12,560
Independent	Rodolphe Gariépy	393
Progressive Conservative	Damien Neveu	318
Social Credit	Joseph-Arthur Marchand	161

1949 Canadian federal election
Party	Candidate	Votes
Liberal	Georges-Émile Lapalme	18,755
Progressive Conservative	Claude-Édouard Hétu	13,584
Union des électeurs	Frédéric Therrien	361

By-election on 3 October 1950 Lapalme resigned, 23 June 1950
Party	Candidate	Votes
Liberal	Maurice Breton	acclaimed

1953 Canadian federal election
Party	Candidate	Votes
Liberal	Maurice Breton	18,149
Progressive Conservative	Sarto Blais	4,541

1957 Canadian federal election
Party	Candidate	Votes
Liberal	Maurice Breton	19,445
Progressive Conservative	Placide Morency	4,409

1958 Canadian federal election
Party	Candidate	Votes
Progressive Conservative	Louis-Joseph Pigeon	21,821
Liberal	Maurice Breton	15,454

1962 Canadian federal election
Party	Candidate	Votes
Progressive Conservative	Louis-Joseph Pigeon	17,600
Liberal	J.-Roland Comtois	12,172
Social Credit	Victor Pagette	6,310
New Democratic	Pierre-Émile Doré	829

1963 Canadian federal election
Party	Candidate	Votes
Progressive Conservative	Louis-Joseph Pigeon	16,103
Liberal	Joseph-Roland Comtois	12,299
Social Credit	Victor Pagette	7,399
New Democratic	Raymond Legendre	2,033

1965 Canadian federal election
Party	Candidate	Votes
Liberal	Joseph-Roland Comtois	15,221
Progressive Conservative	Roch La Salle	15,043
New Democratic	Noël Lacas	4,951
Ralliement créditiste	Jean Boisclair	2,961

== See also ==
- List of Canadian electoral districts
- Historical federal electoral districts of Canada
