= Charles-Édouard Ferland =

Canadian politician

The Hon. Charles-Édouard Ferland

Member of the Canadian Parliament for Joliette
- In office December 1928 – October 1935
- Preceded by: Jean-Joseph Denis
- Succeeded by: riding dissolved

Member of the Canadian Parliament for Joliette—l'Assomption—Montcalm
- In office October 1935 – June 1945
- Preceded by: riding created
- Succeeded by: Georges-Émile Lapalme

Senator for Shawinegan, Quebec
- In office 1945–1951
- Appointed by: William Lyon Mackenzie King
- Preceded by: Charles Bourgeois
- Succeeded by: Léon Méthot

Personal details
- Born: 2 March 1892 Sainte-Élisabeth, Quebec
- Died: 8 January 1974 (aged 81)
- Party: Liberal
- Spouse(s): Marie-Rose Brunelle m. 4 January 1923
- Profession: lawyer

Charles-Édouard Ferland (2 March 1892 – 8 January 1974) was a Canadian jurist and Liberal member of the House of Commons of Canada and Senate of Canada. He was born in Sainte-Élisabeth, Quebec in Joliette County and became a lawyer by career.

Ferland attended seminary at Joliette then the Université de Montréal where he received Bachelor of Arts, Ph.L and LL.L degrees.

He was first elected to Parliament at the Joliette riding in a by-election on 17 December 1928 then re-elected there in the 1930 general election. When riding boundaries were changed in 1933, Ferland sought re-election at the new Joliette—l'Assomption—Montcalm riding and won that seat in the 1935 election and re-elected there in 1940. After completing that term, he was appointed in 1945 to the Senate and remained in that post until April 1951 when he resigned to accept a position as a Puisne Judge on the Superior Court of Quebec.
