= Joseph Adélard Dubeau =

Canadian politician

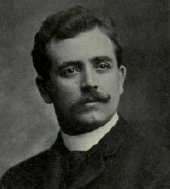

Member of the Canadian Parliament for Joliette
- In office 1904–1911
- Preceded by: Charles Bazinet
- Succeeded by: Joseph-Pierre Guilbault

Personal details
- Born: March 25, 1873 Saint-Ambroise-de-Kildare, Quebec
- Died: October 10, 1937 (aged 64)
- Party: Liberal

Joseph Adélard Dubeau (March 25, 1873 – October 10, 1937) was a Canadian politician.

Born in Saint-Ambroise-de-Kildare, Quebec, Dubeau was educated at the College of Joliette and read law in the office of Joseph-Mathias Tellier, the M.L.A. for Joliette. He was first elected to the House of Commons of Canada for the electoral district of Joliette in the general elections of 1904. A Liberal, he was re-elected in 1908 and was defeated in 1911 and 1917.
