= Louis François Georges Baby =

Canadian politician and judge

The Honourable Louis François Georges Baby PC
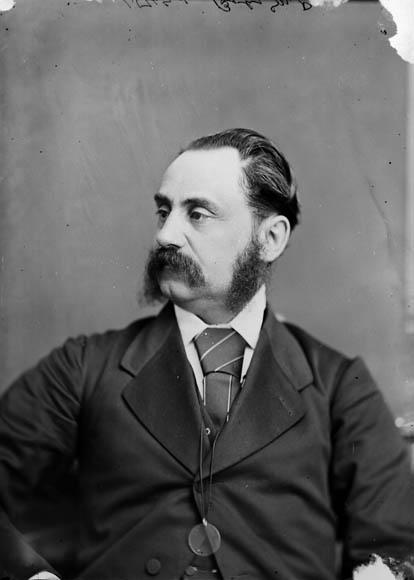

Member of the Canadian Parliament for Joliette
- In office 1872–1880
- Preceded by: François Benjamin Godin
- Succeeded by: Lewis Arthur McConville

Personal details
- Born: August 26, 1832 Montreal, Lower Canada
- Died: May 13, 1906 (aged 73)
- Party: Conservative Party
- Occupation: lawyer

Louis François Georges Baby, PC (August 26, 1832 – May 13, 1906) was a Canadian politician and judge.

Born in Montreal, Lower Canada, he first ran for public office in the 1867 federal election in the Quebec riding of Joliette, but lost to François Benjamin Godin. A Conservative candidate, he was acclaimed in the 1872 elections. However, he was unseated by petition protesting the outcome of an election on June 11, 1874. He was re-elected in the resulting 1874 by-election and re-elected in 1878. From 1878 to 1880, he was the Minister of Inland Revenue. From 1881 to 1896, he was the judge of the Quebec Court of Appeal.

Baby was a notable collector of Canadian coins, medals, books, and manuscripts.
