= Hilaire Neveu =

Canadian politician

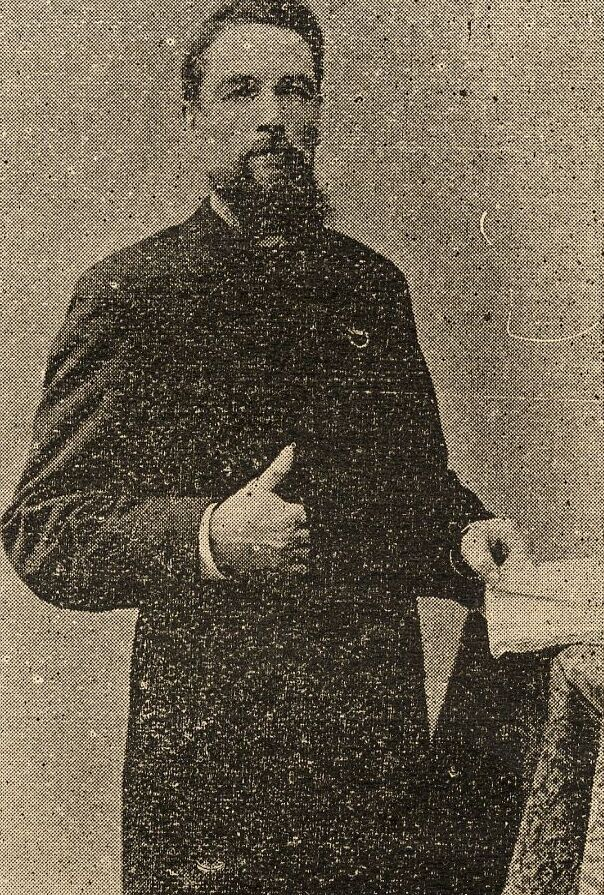
Hilaire Neveu, mayor of Saint-Ambroise-de-Kildare

Hilaire Neveu (August 30, 1839 – July 10, 1913) was a farmer and political figure in Quebec. He represented Joliette in the House of Commons of Canada from 1889 to 1891 as a Nationalist/Liberal member.

He was born in Kildare, Lower Canada, the son of Gouzagne Neveu and Henriette Farley, and educated at the model school there. In 1867, he married Armeline Ducharme. He served twenty years as mayor of Saint-Ambroise-de-Kildare, also serving as school commissioner and warden for Joliette County for 15 years. Neveu was defeated by Édouard Guilbault in the 1887 federal election by a single vote; that election was appealed and Neveu won the by-election which followed in 1889. He was defeated by Urbain Lippé when he ran for reelection in 1891.
