= Pierre Paquette =

Canadian politician

Pierre A. Paquette

Member of the Canadian Parliament for Joliette
- In office 2000–2011
- Preceded by: René Laurin
- Succeeded by: Francine Raynault

Personal details
- Born: June 1, 1955 (age 71) Sorel, Quebec, Canada
- Party: Bloc Québécois, Parti Québécois
- Profession: economist/unionist
- Portfolio: Bloc Québécois House Leader (2007–2011)

Pierre A. Paquette (born June 1, 1955) is a Canadian economist, professor, union leader and politician.

Born in Sorel, Quebec, Paquette was first elected to the House of Commons of Canada as a member of the Bloc Québécois in the 2000 Canadian federal election in the riding of Joliette. He was re-elected in the 2004 Canadian federal election defeating the Liberal candidate by nearly 20,000 votes. He is the Bloc former critic of International Financial Institutions and Finance, and is the current critic of Globalization, Financial Institutions, and International Trade. After his promotion to House Leader in April 2007, many pundits claimed he was being groomed as Gilles Duceppe's successor. Paquette made no attempt to dispel rumours that he was considering a run for BQ leadership, openly stating he was "considering" a run during the 24-hour period in which it seemed Duceppe would depart for the 2007 Parti Québécois leadership election.

Paquette was the Bloc's House Leader until losing his seat in the May 2, 2011 federal election which reduced the Bloc to four seats in the House of Commons. On May 11, 2011, he announced his intention to stand for the leadership of the Bloc. However, in August he announced he would not be a candidate and called for the leadership election to be delayed until late 2012.

In the 2014 provincial election he ran for the Parti Québécois in L'Assomption, but was defeated by incumbent CAQ leader François Legault.
