= Joliette—Manawan =

Federal electoral district in Quebec, Canada

Coordinates: 46.654°N 73.962°W

Quebec electoral district
- Interactive map of riding boundaries from the 2025 federal election

Federal electoral district
- Legislature: House of Commons
MP
Gabriel Ste-Marie
Bloc Québécois
- District created: 1966
- First contested: 1968
- Last contested: 2021
- District webpage: profile, map

Demographics
- Population (2016): 104,136
- Electors (2019): 88,831
- Area (km²): 9,102
- Pop. density (per km²): 11.4
- Census division(s): Joliette, L'Assomption, Matawinie
- Census subdivision(s): L'Assomption (part), Joliette, Saint-Charles-Borromée, Rawdon, Notre-Dame-des-Prairies, Saint-Paul, Crabtree, Saint-Ambroise-de-Kildare, Saint-Thomas, Saint-Alphonse-Rodriguez

Joliette—Manawan (formerly Joliette, French pronunciation: [ʒɔljɛt]) is a federal electoral district in Quebec, Canada, that has been represented in the House of Commons of Canada from 1867 to 1935 and since 1968.

== Geography ==
This electoral district, located northeast of Montreal in the Quebec region of Lanaudière, currently consists of:

- the Regional County Municipality of Matawinie, including Communauté Atikamekw de Manawan indian reserve
- the Regional County Municipality of Joliette.

It is bounded by the:

- electoral district of Repentigny and Berthier—Maskinongé and the Saint Lawrence River to the south
- electoral district of Saint-Maurice—Champlain to the east and north
- Lac Nemiscachingue and the electoral districts of Laurentides—Labelle, Les Pays-d'en-Haut and Montcalm to the west

== Demographics ==
According to the 2021 Canadian census

Ethnic groups: 93.4% White, 3.8% Indigenous, 1.1% Black

Languages: 92.5% French, 2.1% English, 1.8% Atikamekw

Religions: 70.0% Christian (63.5% Catholic, 6.5% Other), 28.4% None

Median income: $37,200 (2020)

Average income: $45,280 (2020)

== History ==
It was created by the British North America Act 1867 which preserved existing electoral districts in Lower Canada. In 1933, Joliette became part of the new electoral district of Joliette—L'Assomption—Montcalm.

It was created again in 1966 from Berthier—Maskinongé—delanaudière, Joliette—L'Assomption—Montcalm and Terrebonne ridings.

This riding lost territory to Berthier—Maskinongé during the 2012 electoral redistribution.

Following the 2022 Canadian federal electoral redistribution, the riding was largely replaced by Joliette—Manawan. It lost the municipalities of Saint-Donat and Notre-Dame-de-la-Merci to Laurentides—Labelle; it lost the municipalities of Entrelacs and Chertsey to Les Pays-d'en-Haut; and it gained the Domaine-Ouellet area from Repentigny.

=== Members of Parliament ===
This riding has elected the following members of Parliament:

Parliament	Years	Member	Party
Joliette
1st	1867–1872	François Benjamin Godin	Liberal
2nd	1872–1874	Louis François Georges Baby	Conservative
3rd	1874–1874	Louis François Georges Baby	Conservative
3rd	1874–1878	Louis François Georges Baby	Conservative
4th	1878–1878	Louis François Georges Baby	Conservative
4th	1878–1880	Louis François Georges Baby	Conservative
4th	1880–1882	Lewis Arthur McConville	Conservative
5th	1882–1882	Édouard Guilbault	Conservative
5th	1882–1887	Édouard Guilbault	Independent Conservative
6th	1887–1889	Édouard Guilbault	Conservative
6th	1889–1891	Hilaire Neveu	Nationalist
7th	1891–1896	Urbain Lippé	Conservative
8th	1896–1900	Charles Bazinet	Liberal
9th	1900–1904	Charles Bazinet	Liberal
10th	1904–1908	Joseph Adélard Dubeau	Liberal
11th	1908–1911	Joseph Adélard Dubeau	Liberal
12th	1911–1917	Joseph Pierre Octave Guilbault	Conservative
13th	1917–1921	Jean-Joseph Denis	Liberal
14th	1921–1925	Jean-Joseph Denis	Liberal
15th	1925–1926	Jean-Joseph Denis	Liberal
16th	1926–1928	Jean-Joseph Denis	Liberal
16th	1928–1930	Charles-Édouard Ferland	Liberal
17th	1930–1935	Charles-Édouard Ferland	Liberal
Riding dissolved into Joliette—L'Assomption—Montcalm
Riding re-created from Berthier—Maskinongé—Delanaudière, Joliette—L'Assomption—Montcalm and Terrebonne
28th	1968–1971	Roch La Salle	Progressive Conservative
28th	1971–1972	Roch La Salle	Independent
29th	1972–1974	Roch La Salle	Independent
30th	1974–1979	Roch La Salle	Progressive Conservative
31st	1979–1980	Roch La Salle	Progressive Conservative
32nd	1980–1984	Roch La Salle	Progressive Conservative
33rd	1984–1988	Roch La Salle	Progressive Conservative
34th	1988–1993	Gaby Larrivée	Progressive Conservative
35th	1993–1997	René Laurin	Bloc Québécois
36th	1997–2000	René Laurin	Bloc Québécois
37th	2000–2004	Pierre Paquette	Bloc Québécois
38th	2004–2006	Pierre Paquette	Bloc Québécois
39th	2006–2008	Pierre Paquette	Bloc Québécois
40th	2008–2011	Pierre Paquette	Bloc Québécois
41st	2011–2015	Francine Raynault	New Democratic
42nd	2015–2018	Gabriel Ste-Marie	Bloc Québécois
42nd	2018–2018	Gabriel Ste-Marie	Groupe parlementaire québécois
42nd	2018–2019	Gabriel Ste-Marie	Bloc Québécois
43rd	2019–2021	Gabriel Ste-Marie	Bloc Québécois
44th	2021–2025	Gabriel Ste-Marie	Bloc Québécois
Joliette—Manawan
45th	2025–present	Gabriel Ste-Marie	Bloc Québécois

== Election results ==
=== Joliette—Manawan ===
2025 Canadian federal election
Party	Candidate	Votes	%	±%	Expenditures
Bloc Québécois	Gabriel Ste-Marie	28,196	49.27	–5.87	$27,759.58
Liberal	Marc Allaire	17,890	31.26	+8.98	$9,580.50
Conservative	Pascal Bapfou Vozang Siewe	8,721	15.24	+5.76	$1,861.49
New Democratic	Vanessa Gordon	1,408	2.46	–3.33	$0.00
Green	Érica Poirier	1,014	1.77	–0.18	$0.00
Total valid votes/expense limit		57,229	98.14	+0.49	$135,617.63
Total rejected ballots		1,087	1.86	–0.49	
Turnout		58,316	65.07	+2.92	
Eligible voters (Note: Number of eligible voters does not include election day registrations.)		89,623			
Bloc Québécois notional hold		Swing		–7.42	
Source: Elections Canada

2021 federal election redistributed results
Party	Vote	%
Bloc Québécois	28,538	55.14
Liberal	11,533	22.28
Conservative	4,904	9.47
New Democratic	2,997	5.79
People's	1,565	3.02
Green	1,011	1.95
Free	970	1.87
Marijuana	219	0.42
Indépendance du Québec	21	0.04
Total valid votes	51,758	97.64
Rejected ballots	1,250	2.36
Registered voters/ estimated turnout	85,297	62.15

=== 1968–present ===
Graph of election results in Joliette (minor parties that never got 2% of the vote or didn't run consistently are omitted) View source data.

2021 Canadian federal election: Joliette
Party	Candidate	Votes	%	±%	Expenditures
Bloc Québécois	Gabriel Ste-Marie	30,913	55.0	-3.2	$20,415.99
Liberal	Michel Bourgeois	12,731	22.7	+0.2	$14,000.77
Conservative	Roger Materne	5,314	9.5	+0.5	$2,412.32
New Democratic	Alexis Beaudet	3,100	5.5	+0.9	$59.42
People's	Maxime Leclerc	1,771	3.2	+2.3	$0.00
Green	Érica Poirier	1,126	2.0	-2.1	$80.52
Free	Manon Coutu	992	1.8	N/A	$2,900.09
Marijuana	Yanick Théoret	251	0.4	N/A	$0.00
Total valid votes/expense limit		56,198	97.7	–	$120,469.50
Total rejected ballots		1,332	2.3		
Turnout		57,530	62.3		
Registered voters		92,281			
Bloc Québécois hold		Swing		-1.8	
Source: Elections Canada

2019 Canadian federal election: Joliette
Party	Candidate	Votes	%	±%	Expenditures
Bloc Québécois	Gabriel Ste-Marie	33,590	58.22	+24.92	$25,277.75
Liberal	Michel Bourgeois	12,995	22.52	-5.70	$33,054.52
Conservative	Jean-Martin Masse	5,176	8.97	-1.09	$15,856.88
New Democratic	Julienne Soumaoro	2,623	4.55	-21.14	none listed
Green	Érica Poirier	2,343	4.06	+1.71	$752.47
People's	Sylvain Prescott	498	0.86	–	$932.68
Indépendance du Québec	Paul Savard	474	0.82	–	$0.00
Total valid votes/expense limit		57,699	100.0		
Total rejected ballots		1,203	1.35	+0.15	
Turnout		58,902	66.31	-0.91	
Eligible voters		88,831			
Bloc Québécois hold		Swing		+15.31	
Source: Elections Canada

2015 Canadian federal election: Joliette
Party	Candidate	Votes	%	±%	Expenditures
Bloc Québécois	Gabriel Ste-Marie	18,875	33.30	+0.29	$39,176.25
Liberal	Michel Bourgeois	15,995	28.22	+21.83	$24,407.76
New Democratic	Danielle Landreville	14,566	25.69	-21.23	$46,434.16
Conservative	Soheil Eid	5,705	10.06	+0.37	$34,086.31
Green	Mathieu Morin	1,335	2.35	-1.64	$1,229.90
Strength in Democracy	Robert D. Morais	213	0.38	–	–
Total valid votes/expense limit		56,689	100.0		$233,084.37
Total rejected ballots		1,109	1.20	-0.36	
Turnout		57,798	67.22	+3.7	
Eligible voters		85,981			
Bloc Québécois gain from New Democratic		Swing		+10.8	
Source: Elections Canada

2011 federal election redistributed results
Party	Vote	%
New Democratic	23,813	46.92
Bloc Québécois	16,751	33.01
Conservative	4,919	9.69
Liberal	3,243	6.39
Green	2,024	3.99

2011 Canadian federal election: Joliette
Party	Candidate	Votes	%	±%	Expenditures
New Democratic	Francine Raynault	27,050	47.33	+36.91	
Bloc Québécois	Pierre Paquette	18,804	32.90	-19.50	
Conservative	Michel Morand	5,525	9.67	-8.16	
Liberal	François Boucher	3,545	6.20	-8.32	
Green	Annie Durette	2,227	3.90	-0.94	
Total valid votes/expense limit		57,151	100.00		
Total rejected ballots		904	1.56	-0.05	
Turnout		58,055	63.52	+1.50	
Eligible voters		91,395	–	–	

2008 Canadian federal election: Joliette
Party	Candidate	Votes	%	±%	Expenditures
Bloc Québécois	Pierre Paquette	28,040	52.40	-1.63	$66,256
Conservative	Sylvie Lavallée	9,540	17.83	-8.93	$55,729
Liberal	Suzie St-Onge	7,769	14.52	+4.62	$4,504
New Democratic	Francine Raynault	5,579	10.42	+5.05	$1,331
Green	Annie Durette	2,588	4.84	+0.90	$2,465
Total valid votes/expense limit		53,516	100.00	$94,530	
Total rejected ballots		878	1.61		
Turnout		54,394	62.02		
Bloc Québécois hold		Swing		+3.65	

2006 Canadian federal election: Joliette
Party	Candidate	Votes	%	±%	Expenditures
Bloc Québécois	Pierre Paquette	28,630	54.03	-9.39	$59,887
Conservative	Sylvie Lavallée	14,182	26.76	+20.33	$33,883
Liberal	Gérard Leclerc	5,245	9.90	-12.80	$8,879
New Democratic	Jacques Trudeau	2,845	5.37	+1.74	$2,326
Green	Jean-François Lévêque	2,086	3.94	+1.57	$0
Total valid votes/expense limit		52,988	100.00	$86,852	

2004 Canadian federal election: Joliette
Party	Candidate	Votes	%	±%	Expenditures
Bloc Québécois	Pierre Paquette	30,661	63.42	+11.22	$68,711
Liberal	Jean-François Coderre	10,975	22.70	-10.06	$40,336
Conservative	Daniel Bouchard	3,107	6.43	-4.98	$4,639
New Democratic	Jacques Trudeau	1,755	3.63	+1.23	$1,187
Green	Wendy Gorchinsky	1,147	2.37	–	$77
Marijuana	Marco Geoffroy	701	1.45	–	
Total valid votes/expense limit		48,346	100.00	$84,187	

Note: Conservative vote is compared to the total of the Canadian Alliance vote and Progressive Conservative vote in the 2000 election.

2000 Canadian federal election: Joliette (federal electoral district)
Party	Candidate	Votes	%	±%
Bloc Québécois	Pierre Paquette	23,615	52.20	+5.66
Liberal	Robert Malo	14,820	32.76	+17.41
Progressive Conservative	Eric Champagne	2,730	6.03	-29.83
Alliance	Clément Lévesque	2,432	5.38	
New Democratic	François Rivest	1,085	2.40	+1.36
Communist	Bob Aubin	560	1.24	
Total valid votes		45,242	100.00	

1997 Canadian federal election: Joliette
Party	Candidate	Votes	%	±%	Expenditures
Bloc Québécois	René Laurin	22,605	46.54		$58,632
Progressive Conservative	Anie Perrault	17,417	35.86		$27,044
Liberal	Denise Cloutier Bergeron	7,452	15.34	–	$19,618
Natural Law	Gilles Roy	594	1.22		$707
New Democratic	Jacques Trudeau	502	1.03		$910
Total valid votes		48,570	100.00		
Total rejected ballots		2,407			
Turnout		50,977	73.56		
Electors on the lists		69,304			
Sources: Official Results, Elections Canada and Financial Returns, Elections Canada.

1993 Canadian federal election: Joliette
Party	Candidate	Votes	%	±%
Bloc Québécois	René Laurin	41,057	65.94	
Liberal	Réjean Lefebvre	10,344	16.61	-8.20
Progressive Conservative	Gaby Larrivée	8,776	14.10	-40.99
Natural Law	Gilles Roy	1,274	2.05	
New Democratic	Gilles De Chantal	809	1.30	-12.98
Total valid votes		62,260	100.00	

1988 Canadian federal election: Joliette
Party	Candidate	Votes	%	±%
Progressive Conservative	Gaby Larrivée	27,908	55.09	-18.83
Liberal	Denis Coderre	12,573	24.82	+7.68
New Democratic	Claude Hétu	7,232	14.28	+10.12
Green	Gaétan Riopel-Savignac	2,290	4.52	
Independent	Jean-François Desroches	530	1.05	
Commonwealth of Canada	François Roy	128	0.25	+0.17
Total valid votes		50,661	100.00	

1984 Canadian federal election: Joliette
Party	Candidate	Votes	%	±%
Progressive Conservative	Roch La Salle	38,839	73.91	+8.59
Liberal	Hélène Meagher	9,006	17.14	-13.47
New Democratic	Martin Vaillancourt	2,186	4.16	+3.41
Rhinoceros	Henri Dicule Mondor	1,515	2.88	+1.10
Parti nationaliste	Marc Argeris	654	1.24	
Social Credit	Alfred Blouin	200	0.38	+0.13
Communist	Montserrat Escola	103	0.20	
Commonwealth of Canada	Isaylovic Momo	44	0.08	
Total valid votes		52,547	100.00	

Canadian federal by-election, 17 August 1981
Party	Candidate	Votes	%	±%
On resignation of Mr. LaSalle, 17 March 1981
Progressive Conservative	Roch Lasalle	24,434	65.32	+18.36
Liberal	Michel Denis	11,450	30.61	-15.53
Rhinoceros	Claude Le Propre Forget	667	1.78	
Independent	Jean-Guy Mercier	349	0.93	
New Democratic	Jacques Trudeau	281	0.75	-4.16
Social Credit	Carl O'Malley	92	0.25	-1.35
Independent	Paul Desormiers	91	0.24	
Independent	Raymond J. Turmel	42	0.11	
Total valid votes		37,406	100.00	

1980 Canadian federal election: Joliette
Party	Candidate	Votes	%	±%
Progressive Conservative	Roch Lasalle	22,280	46.96	-3.76
Liberal	Gilles Ratelle	21,891	46.14	+7.05
New Democratic	Jacques Trudeau	2,330	4.91	+2.11
Social Credit	Alfred Blouin	756	1.59	-3.58
Marxist–Leninist	Mario Verrier	184	0.39	+0.23
Total valid votes		47,441	100.00	

1979 Canadian federal election: Joliette
Party	Candidate	Votes	%	±%
Progressive Conservative	Roch Lasalle	23,960	50.72	-3.84
Liberal	Roger Cabana	18,466	39.09	+3.93
Social Credit	Alfred Blouin	2,446	5.18	-2.30
New Democratic	Jacques Trudeau	1,324	2.80	+0.87
Rhinoceros	Andrée social Hallé	828	1.75	
Union populaire	Robert Forget	140	0.30	
Marxist–Leninist	André Pesant	74	0.16	-0.22
Total valid votes		47,238	100.00	

1974 Canadian federal election: Joliette
Party	Candidate	Votes	%	±%
Progressive Conservative	Roch Lasalle	22,546	54.56	+7.83
Liberal	Serge Rochon	14,529	35.16	+2.02
Social Credit	Louis Comtois	3,090	7.48	-7.13
New Democratic	Gerard Doyon	797	1.93	-2.65
Communist	J.E. Poirier	201	0.49	
Marxist–Leninist	André Pesant	157	0.38	
Total valid votes		41,320	100.00	

Note: results from the 1974 federal election are missing from the Library of Parliament website. Results shown are incomplete results (250 of 256 polling stations reporting) reported in the Globe and Mail on 9 July 1974.

Note: percentage change for Roch LaSalle compares his vote as a PC candidate in 1974 to his vote as an independent candidate in 1972.

1972 Canadian federal election: Joliette (federal electoral district)
Party	Candidate	Votes	%	±%
Independent	Roch Lasalle	18,074	46.73	+3.40
Liberal	Claude Livernoche	12,819	33.14	-9.58
Social Credit	Louis Comtois	5,652	14.61	+6.30
Progressive Conservative	Sylvio Ricard	1,770	4.58	
New Democratic	Constance Riverin	361	0.93	-4.70
Total valid votes		38,676	100.00	

Note: Social Credit vote is compared to Ralliement créditiste vote in the 1968 election. Note: percentage change for Roch LaSalle compares his vote as an independent candidate in 1972 to his vote as a PC candidate in 1968.

1968 Canadian federal election: Joliette
Party	Candidate	Votes	%
Progressive Conservative	Roch Lasalle	12,464	43.33
Liberal	Georges Rondeau	12,292	42.73
Ralliement créditiste	Aurélien Neveu	2,391	8.31
New Democratic	Roland Bourgeois	1,620	5.63
Total valid votes		28,767	100.00

=== 1867–1935 ===
1930 Canadian federal election
Party	Candidate	Votes	%	±%
Liberal	Charles-Édouard Ferland	5,904	54.25	-12.33
Conservative	Joseph-Conrad Perrault	4,979	45.75	
Total valid votes		10,883	100.00	

Canadian federal by-election, 17 December 1928
Party	Candidate	Votes	%	±%
On Mr. Denis' acceptance of an office of emolument under the Crown, 3 November 1928
Liberal	Charles-Édouard Ferland	5,251	66.58	
Liberal	René-Laurier Guilbault	2,636	33.42	
Total valid votes		7,887	100.00	

1926 Canadian federal election
Party	Candidate	Votes	%	±%
Liberal	Jean-Joseph Denis	5,659	57.39	-0.43
Conservative	Joseph Damien Neveu	4,202	42.61	+0.43
Total valid votes		9,861	100.00	

1925 Canadian federal election
Party	Candidate	Votes	%	±%
Liberal	Jean-Joseph Denis	5,638	57.81	-2.82
Conservative	Joseph Emery Ladouceur	4,114	42.19	+5.41
Total valid votes		9,752	100.00	

1921 Canadian federal election
Party	Candidate	Votes	%	±%
Liberal	Jean-Joseph Denis	6,203	60.63	+6.95
Conservative	Joseph Pierre Laporte	3,763	36.78	
Independent	Paplinuce Bonin	265	2.59	
Total valid votes		10,231	100.00	

1917 Canadian federal election
Party	Candidate	Votes	%	±%
Opposition (Laurier Liberals)	Jean-Joseph Denis	2,459	53.68	
Opposition (Laurier Liberals)	Joseph Adélard Dubeau	2,122	46.32	-2.93
Total valid votes		4,581	100.00	

1911 Canadian federal election
Party	Candidate	Votes	%	±%
Conservative	Joseph Pierre Octave Guilbault	2,239	50.75	+4.74
Liberal	Joseph Adélard Dubeau	2,173	49.25	-4.74
Total valid votes		4,412	100.00	

1908 Canadian federal election
Party	Candidate	Votes	%	±%
Liberal	Joseph Adélard Dubeau	2,178	53.99	+1.04
Conservative	Joseph-Alexandre Guilbault	1,856	46.01	-1.04
Total valid votes		4,034	100.00	

1904 Canadian federal election
Party	Candidate	Votes	%	±%
Liberal	Joseph Adélard Dubeau	1,972	52.95	+1.76
Conservative	Joseph Adolphe Renaud	1,752	47.05	-1.76
Total valid votes		3,724	100.00	

1900 Canadian federal election
Party	Candidate	Votes	%	±%
Liberal	Charles Bazinet	1,822	51.19	-3.71
Conservative	Joseph Adolphe Renaud	1,737	48.81	+3.71
Total valid votes		3,559	100.00	

1896 Canadian federal election
Party	Candidate	Votes	%	±%
Liberal	Charles Bazinet	1,769	54.90	+5.87
Conservative	V.P. Lavallée	1,453	45.10	-5.87
Total valid votes		3,222	100.00	

1891 Canadian federal election
Party	Candidate	Votes	%	±%
Conservative	Urbain Lippe	1,581	50.97	
Liberal	Hilaire Neveu	1,521	49.03	
Total valid votes		3,102	100.00	

By-election on 16 January 1889 On election being declared void, 6 November 1888
Party	Candidate	Votes	%	±%
Nationalist	Hilaire Neveu	?		
Independent Conservative	Édouard Guilbault	?	–	
Total valid votes		?		

1887 Canadian federal election
Party	Candidate	Votes	%	±%
Conservative	Édouard Guilbault	1,533	50.02	-8.23
Liberal	Hilaire Neveu	1,532	49.98	
Total valid votes		3,065	100.00	

N.B. Mr. Guilbault elected by the casting vote of the Returning Officer.

Canadian federal by-election, 7 December 1882
Party	Candidate	Votes	%	±%
On election being declared void, 4 November 1882
Independent Conservative	Édouard Guilbault	1,070	58.25	+3.20
Conservative	J.N.A. McConville	767	41.75	
Total valid votes		1,837	100.00	

Note: The change in Mr. Guilbault's popular vote is compared to his result in the 1882 general election.

1882 Canadian federal election
Party	Candidate	Votes	%	±%
Conservative	Édouard Guilbault	1,215	55.05	
Conservative	Lewis Arthur McConville	992	44.95	-19.19
Total valid votes		2,207	100.00	

Canadian federal by-election, 9 December 1880
Party	Candidate	Votes	%	±%
On Mr. Baby being appointed Puisne Judge, Quebec Superior Court, 29 October 1880
Conservative	Lewis Arthur McConville	1,225	64.14	+5.86
Liberal	F.B. Godin	685	35.86	-5.86
Total valid votes		1,910	100.00	

By-election on 14 November 1878 On Mr. Baby being named Minister of Inland Revenue, 26 October 1878
Party	Candidate	Votes
Conservative	Louis François Georges Baby	acclaimed

1878 Canadian federal election
Party	Candidate	Votes	%	±%
Conservative	Louis François Georges Baby	1,264	58.28	+4.15
Liberal	François Benjamin Godin	905	41.72	
Total valid votes		2,169	100.00	

Canadian federal by-election, 10 December 1874
Party	Candidate	Votes	%	±%
Mr. Baby being unseated on petition, 6 November 1874
Conservative	Louis François Georges Baby	1,069	54.13	+2.88
Unknown	Amable Beaupré	906	45.87	-2.88
Total valid votes		1,975	100.00	

1874 Canadian federal election
Party	Candidate	Votes	%
Conservative	Louis François Georges Baby	924	51.25
Unknown	A. Beaupré	879	48.75
Total valid votes		1,803	100.00

1872 Canadian federal election
Party	Candidate	Votes
Conservative	Louis François Georges Baby	acclaimed

1867 Canadian federal election
Party	Candidate	Votes	%
Liberal	François Benjamin Godin	918	51.57
Conservative	Louis François Georges Baby	862	48.43
Total valid votes		1780	100.00

== See also ==
- List of Canadian electoral districts
- Historical federal electoral districts of Canada
