= Gabriel Ste-Marie =

Canadian politician

Gabriel Ste-Marie MP
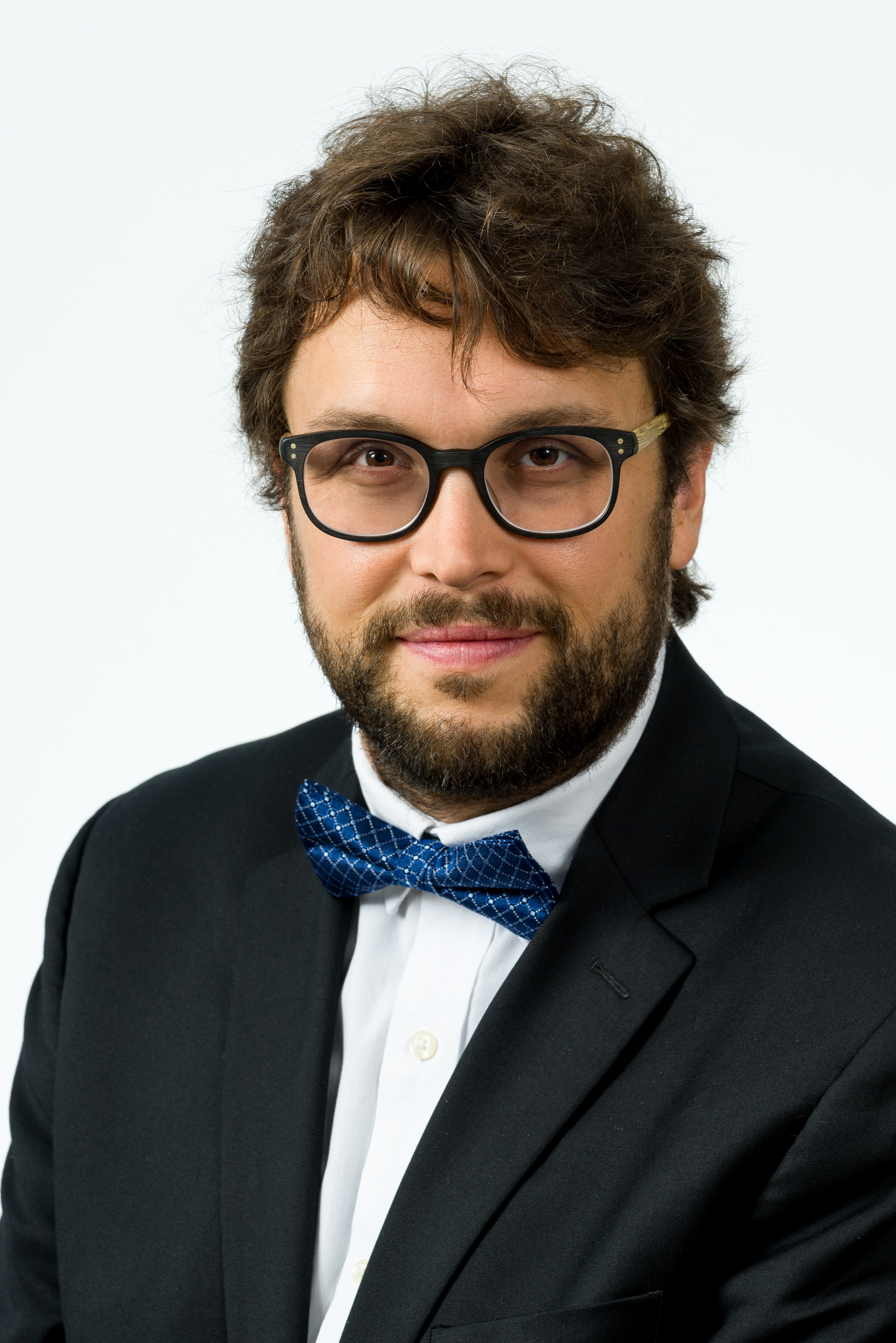
- Ste-Marie's official parliamentary photo

Member of Parliament for Joliette—Manawan Joliette (2015–2025)
- Incumbent
- Assumed office October 19, 2015
- Preceded by: Francine Raynault

Personal details
- Born: Saint-Jean-de-Matha, Quebec
- Party: Bloc Québécois
- Other political affiliations: Québec debout (2018)
- Profession: Economist, Teacher

Gabriel Ste-Marie MP is a Canadian politician and academic who was elected to represent the riding Joliette in the House of Commons in the 2015 election. He teaches economics at Cégep régional de Lanaudière.

Ste-Marie served as the Bloc Québécois House Leader (and its parliamentary leader as the party leader did not have a seat in parliament) from 2017 until he resigned from the position on February 25, 2018 in a dispute with party leader Martine Ouellet. He, along with six other Bloc MPs, resigned from the Bloc's caucus to sit as an independent MP on February 28, 2018 citing conflicts with the leadership style of Martine Ouellet. He rejoined the Bloc Québécois caucus on September 17, 2018.

He is also a researcher at the Contemporary Economics Research Institute and lecturer at Université du Québec à Montréal.

Since 2021 he has served as the critic of finance and the treasury board in the Bloc Québécois Shadow Cabinet. He was elected vice chair of the Canadian House of Commons Standing Committee on Industry, Science and Technology in the 45th Canadian Parliament in 2025.

== Electoral record ==
2025 Canadian federal election: Joliette—Manawan
Party	Candidate	Votes	%	±%	Expenditures
Bloc Québécois	Gabriel Ste-Marie	28,196	49.27	–5.87	$27,759.58
Liberal	Marc Allaire	17,890	31.26	+8.98	$9,580.50
Conservative	Pascal Bapfou Vozang Siewe	8,721	15.24	+5.76	$1,861.49
New Democratic	Vanessa Gordon	1,408	2.46	–3.33	$0.00
Green	Érica Poirier	1,014	1.77	–0.18	$0.00
Total valid votes/expense limit		57,229	98.14	+0.49	$135,617.63
Total rejected ballots		1,087	1.86	–0.49	
Turnout		58,316	65.07	+2.92	
Eligible voters (Note: Number of eligible voters does not include election day registrations.)		89,623			
Bloc Québécois notional hold		Swing		–7.42	
Source: Elections Canada

2021 Canadian federal election: Joliette
Party	Candidate	Votes	%	±%	Expenditures
Bloc Québécois	Gabriel Ste-Marie	30,913	55.0	-3.2	$20,415.99
Liberal	Michel Bourgeois	12,731	22.7	+0.2	$14,000.77
Conservative	Roger Materne	5,314	9.5	+0.5	$2,412.32
New Democratic	Alexis Beaudet	3,100	5.5	+0.9	$59.42
People's	Maxime Leclerc	1,771	3.2	+2.3	$0.00
Green	Érica Poirier	1,126	2.0	-2.1	$80.52
Free	Manon Coutu	992	1.8	N/A	$2,900.09
Marijuana	Yanick Théoret	251	0.4	N/A	$0.00
Total valid votes/expense limit		56,198	97.7	–	$120,469.50
Total rejected ballots		1,332	2.3		
Turnout		57,530	62.3		
Registered voters		92,281			
Bloc Québécois hold		Swing		-1.8	
Source: Elections Canada

2019 Canadian federal election: Joliette
Party	Candidate	Votes	%	±%	Expenditures
Bloc Québécois	Gabriel Ste-Marie	33,590	58.22	+24.92	$25,277.75
Liberal	Michel Bourgeois	12,995	22.52	-5.70	$33,054.52
Conservative	Jean-Martin Masse	5,176	8.97	-1.09	$15,856.88
New Democratic	Julienne Soumaoro	2,623	4.55	-21.14	none listed
Green	Érica Poirier	2,343	4.06	+1.71	$752.47
People's	Sylvain Prescott	498	0.86	–	$932.68
Indépendance du Québec	Paul Savard	474	0.82	–	$0.00
Total valid votes/expense limit		57,699	100.0		
Total rejected ballots		1,203	1.35	+0.15	
Turnout		58,902	66.31	-0.91	
Eligible voters		88,831			
Bloc Québécois hold		Swing		+15.31	
Source: Elections Canada

2015 Canadian federal election
Party	Candidate	Votes	%	±%	Expenditures
Bloc Québécois	Gabriel Ste-Marie	18,875	33.3	+0.29	–
Liberal	Michel Bourgeois	15,995	28.2	+21.81	–
New Democratic	Danielle Landreville	14,566	25.7	-21.22	–
Conservative	Soheil Eid	5,705	10.1	+0.41	–
Green	Mathieu Morin	1,335	2.4	-1.59	–
Strength in Democracy	Robert D. Morais	213	0.4	–	–
Total valid votes/Expense limit		56,689	100.0		$232,599.74
Total rejected ballots		1,109	1.20	-0.36	
Turnout		57,798	67.22	+3.7	
Eligible voters		85,981			
Bloc Québécois gain from New Democratic		Swing		+10.8	
Source: Elections Canada
