= St. Charles Borromeo Cathedral (Joliette) =

Coordinates: 46.0271°N 73.4364°W

- Cathédrale Saint-Charles-Borromée de Joliette
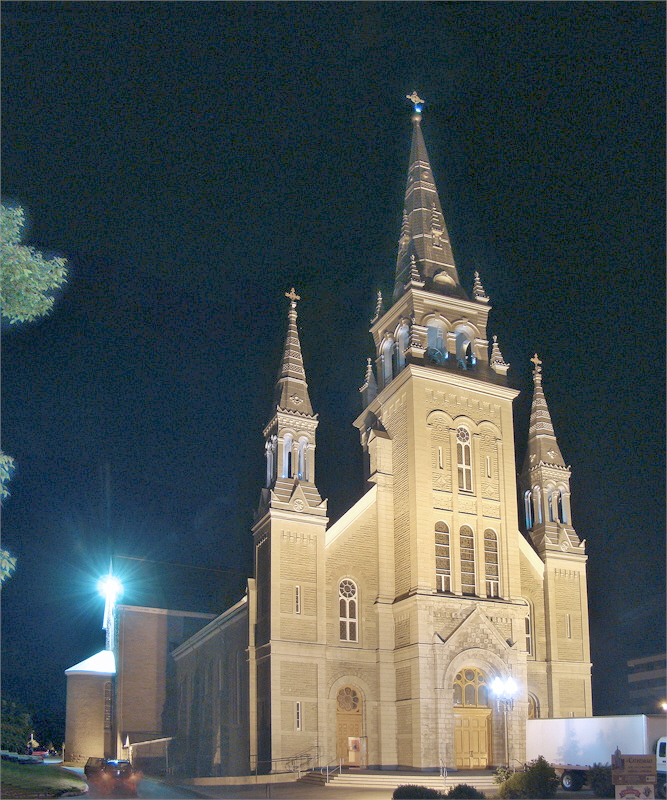
- St. Charles Borromeo Cathedral
- Location: Joliette; Quebec
- Country: Canada
- Denomination: Roman Catholic Church

The St. Charles Borromeo Cathedral (French: Cathédrale Saint-Charles-Borromée de Joliette) is the name given to a religious building belonging to the Catholic Church and is located in Joliette, a town in the administrative region of Lanaudière in the southern part of the province of Quebec (Eastern Canada).

The headquarters of the diocese of Joliette was built between 1887 and 1892 according to plans by the architects Maurice Perrault and Albert Mesnard. It was declared as a protected building (immeuble patrimonial) by the city of Joliette in 1999.

== See also ==
- Roman Catholicism in Canada
