= John McConville =

John McConville (c. 1793 – 10 September 1849) was an Irish-born educator in Lower Canada.

== Life and career ==
John was born in Newry, the son of Meredith McConville and Mary McCardle, and came to Lower Canada, teaching in Montreal, then Vaudreuil and finally Berthier-en-Haut. Although his application supported by the legislative councillor James Cuthbert, McConville was originally rejected for the post in Berthier-en-Haut because he was Roman Catholic, even though he was able to teach in French. He finished his teaching career as principal for the Académie de Berthier. McConville married Mary Magdalen Mackie in 1832. He died in Industrie (later Joliette).

His son Joseph Norbet Alfred served in the Quebec legislative assembly and his son Lewis Arthur served in the Canadian House of Commons.
