= Francine Raynault =

Canadian politician

Member of Parliament for Joliette
- In office May 2, 2011 – October 19, 2015
- Preceded by: Pierre Paquette
- Succeeded by: Gabriel Ste-Marie

Personal details
- Born: March 9, 1945 (age 81) L'Assomption, Quebec
- Party: New Democratic Party
- Occupation: Entrepreneur, Real Estate Agent, Property Caretaker

Francine Raynault (born March 9, 1945) is a Canadian politician, who was elected to the House of Commons of Canada in the 2011 Canadian federal election. She represented the electoral district of Joliette as a member of the New Democratic Party. She did not run for re-election in 2015.

Raynault first ran for the riding of Joliette in 2008 and finished fourth, 22,462 votes behind Bloc Québécois incumbent Pierre Paquette. Indeed, she finished just a few hundred votes over the threshold for having her campaign expenses refunded. During the campaign for the 2011 election, Raynault gained the edge over Pierre Paquette as part of a provincewide surge in support for the New Democratic Party, winning by 8,147 votes on election day.

Raynault studied commerce in Montreal, business management in Joliette and business law at the Université du Québec à Montréal. She is a mother of four and grandmother of nine grandchildren.

Since 1977 she has been a member of the Association féminine d’éducation et d’action sociale, was president of the AFEAS in the Lanaudière region from 1997 to 2001, member of the provincial executive from 2001 to 2007 and provincial second vice-president and first vice-president.

Raynault is a founding member of the Syndicat des agricultrices de Lanaudière. She is a founding member of the Union des producteurs agricoles, Nouvelle-Acadie local section. From 2003 to 2007, Raynault sat on the Executive Committee of the Centre local de développement de Joliette.

She is the great-niece of former Montreal mayor Adhémar Raynault.

== Election results ==
2011 Canadian federal election: Joliette
Party	Candidate	Votes	%	±%	Expenditures
New Democratic	Francine Raynault	27,050	47.33	+36.91	
Bloc Québécois	Pierre Paquette	18,804	32.90	-19.50	
Conservative	Michel Morand	5,525	9.67	-8.16	
Liberal	François Boucher	3,545	6.20	-8.32	
Green	Annie Durette	2,227	3.90	-0.94	
Total valid votes/Expense limit		57,151	100.00		
Total rejected ballots		904	1.56	-0.05	
Turnout		58,055	63.52	+1.50	
Eligible voters		91,395	–	–	

2008 Canadian federal election: Joliette
Party	Candidate	Votes	%	±%	Expenditures
Bloc Québécois	Pierre Paquette	28,040	52.40	-1.63	$66,256
Conservative	Sylvie Lavallée	9,540	17.83	-8.93	$55,729
Liberal	Suzie St-Onge	7,769	14.52	+4.62	$4,504
New Democratic	Francine Raynault	5,579	10.42	+5.05	$1,331
Green	Annie Durette	2,588	4.84	+0.90	$2,465
Total valid votes/Expense limit		53,516	100.00	$94,530	
Total rejected ballots		878	1.61		
Turnout		54,394	62.02		
Bloc Québécois hold		Swing		+3.65	
