= Joseph-Norbert-Alfred McConville =

Canadian politician

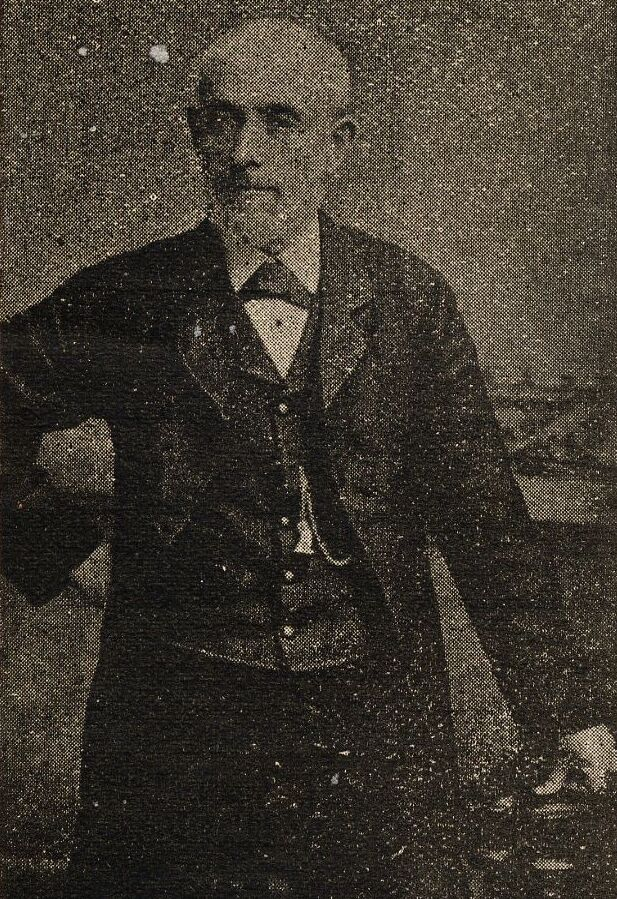
- Born: February 28, 1839; Berthier, Lower Canada
- Died: January 17, 1912 (aged 72); Joliette, Quebec, Canada
- Education: Collège de l'Assomption
- Occupation(s): Lawyer, newspaper owner & politician
- Parents: John McConville (father); Mary McKay (mother)
- Relatives: Lewis Arthur McConville (brother)

Joseph-Norbert-Alfred McConville (February 28, 1839 – January 17, 1912) was a lawyer, newspaper owner and political figure in Quebec. He represented Joliette in the Legislative Assembly of Quebec from 1885 to 1886 as a Conservative member.

He was born in Berthier, Lower Canada, the son of John McConville and Mary McKay. McConville was educated at the Collège de l'Assomption, studied law in Drummondville and was called to the Lower Canada bar in 1865. He set up practice in Joliette. McConville was secretary-treasurer for the school board for Grantham, Wendover and Simpson and for the municipality of Saint-Germain-de-Grantham. He was co-owner and editor of the newspaper L'Industrie with his brother Lewis Arthur. McConville was also co-owner of the Compagnie d'imprimerie de Joliette which published the Gazette de Joliette. He served as school commissioner for Joliette from 1860 to 1890 and also served as captain in the militia. In 1874, he married Anne Marguerite Kittson. He was elected to the provincial assembly in an 1885 by-election held after Vincent-Paul Lavallée was named to the province's Legislative Council and was defeated when he ran for reelection in 1886. McConville served as prothonotary for the Quebec Superior Court at Joliette from 1897 to 1909. He died in Joliette at the age of 72.
