= Joseph Pierre Octave Guilbault =

Canadian politician

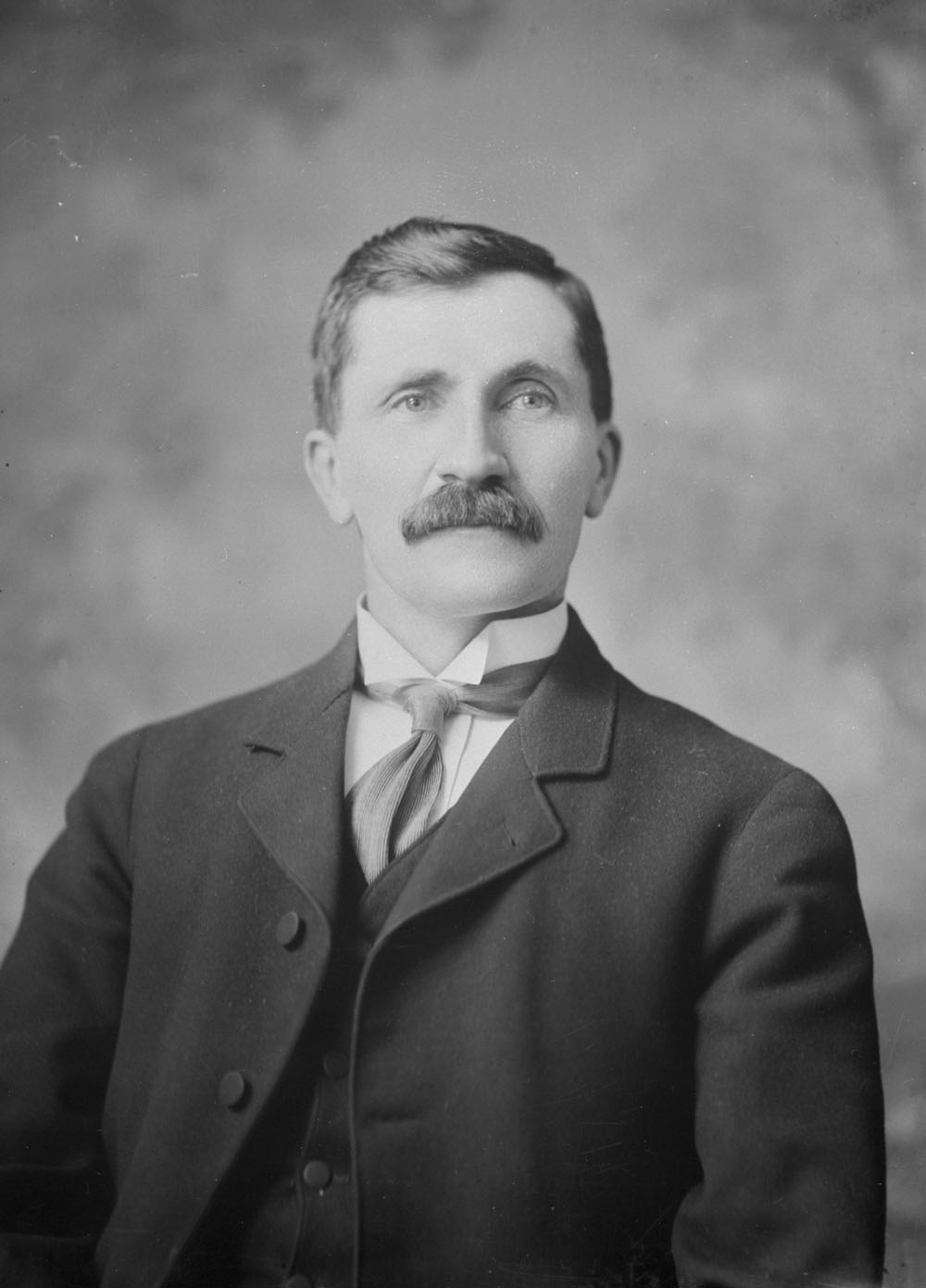
Joseph Pierre Octave Guilbault in 1912

Joseph Pierre Octave Guilbault (September 3, 1870 – September 27, 1924) was a notary and political figure in Quebec. He represented Joliette in the House of Commons of Canada from 1911 to 1917 as a Conservative.

He was born in Saint-Paul, Quebec, the son of Joseph Guilbault and Adelaide Renaud, and was educated at the Collège de l'Assomption and the Université Laval. He set up practice in Joliette. In 1898, he married Clementine Richard. Guilbault was secretary-treasurer of the school commission. He did not run for reelection in 1917 due to illness.
