= Gaby Larrivée =

Canadian politician (born 1933)

Gaby Larrivée MP

Member of Parliament for Joliette
- In office 21 November 1988 – 25 October 1993
- Preceded by: Roch La Salle
- Succeeded by: René Laurin

Mayor of Saint-Charles-Borromée
- In office 1983–1988
- Preceded by: Robert Boucher
- Succeeded by: André Hénault

Personal details
- Born: February 4, 1933 (age 93) Quebec City, Quebec, Canada
- Party: Progressive Conservative
- Profession: Businessman

Gaby Larrivée (born 4 February 1933 in Quebec City, Quebec) was a member of the House of Commons of Canada from 1988 to 1993. His background was in business.

He was elected in the 1988 federal election at the Joliette electoral district for the Progressive Conservative party. He served in the 34th Canadian Parliament after which he was defeated by Bloc Québécois candidate René Laurin in the 1993 federal election.
