= Édouard Guilbault =

Canadian politician

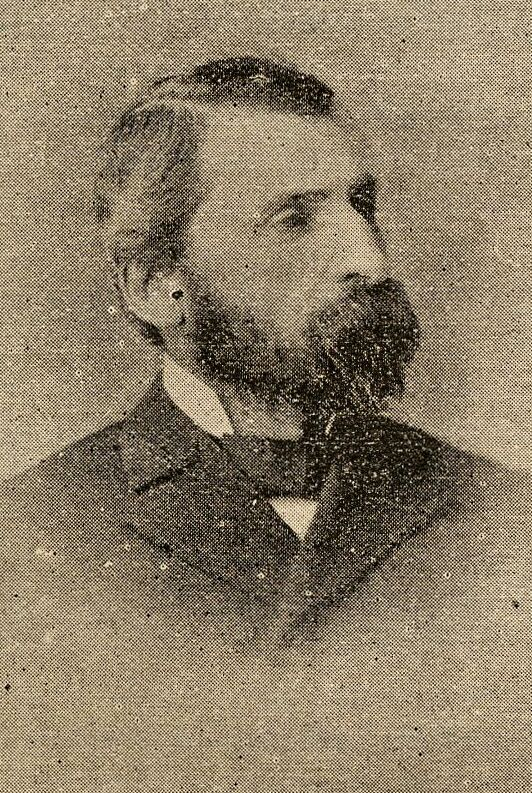

Édouard Guilbault (April 18, 1834 – July 8, 1903) was a manufacturer, merchant and political figure in Quebec, Canada. He represented Joliette in the House of Commons of Canada from 1882 to 1888 as a Conservative then independent

Conservative member.

== Life and work ==
He was born in Ste-Mélanie, Lower Canada and was educated at the Collège Joliette. Guilbault served 33 years on the town council for Joliette, serving as mayor in 1875. He helped establish the agricultural society for Joliette County in 1854, serving as secretary and president for the society. His election to the House of Commons in 1882 was declared void but Guilbault won the by-election that followed later that year. He was elected again in 1887 by a single vote but that election was overturned after an appeal and he was defeated by Hilaire Neveu in the 1889 by-election which followed. Guilbault was one of the founders of the Society of Canadian Tobacco Manufacturers in 1884. He took part in a protest held in 1885 against the execution of Louis Riel.
