= Jean-Joseph Denis =

Canadian politician

Jean-Joseph Denis (January 27, 1876 – September 22, 1960) was a Canadian lawyer, judge and political figure in Quebec. He represented Joliette in the House of Commons of Canada from 1917 to 1928 as a Liberal.

He was born in Saint-Cuthbert, Quebec, the son of Gaspard Denis and Eugènie de Grandpré, and was educated at the Université Laval. He was called to the Quebec bar in 1901 and practised in Montreal until 1903 and then in Berthier. He was an unsuccessful candidate for a seat in the House of Commons in 1911, losing to Joseph-Pierre Guilbault. In 1912, he was named King's Counsel. Denis was elected in 1917 as a Laurier Liberal. He resigned his seat in the House of Commons 1928 after he was named puisne judge in the Quebec Superior Court.
