= François Benjamin Godin =

Canadian politician

François Benjamin Godin (March 28, 1828 – March 3, 1888) was a Quebec lawyer and political figure. He was a Liberal member of the 1st Canadian Parliament representing Joliette.

He was born in Saint-Constant, Lower Canada in 1828, the son of Joseph Godin and Sophie Connaissant, and educated at Montreal. Godin studied law and was called to the bar in 1849. In 1850, he married Alice Bernard. Godin ran unsuccessfully for a seat in the Quebec assembly in 1871. In 1878, he was named Queen's Counsel. He was defeated when he ran for reelection in 1878 and 1880.

His grandson Lucien Dugas later represented Joliette in the Legislative Assembly of Quebec and served as speaker in 1936.
