= Conwell =

Conwell is a surname. Notable people with the surname include:

- Angell Conwell (born 1983), American actress and model
- Carolyn Conwell, American actress
- Ernie Conwell (born 1972), American football player
- Esther M. Conwell (1922–2014), physicist who studied properties of semiconductors and organic conductors
- Henry Conwell (1745–1842), Roman Catholic clergyman
- Joe Conwell (born 1961), American football player
- Leon M. Conwell, American journalist and politician
- Nula Conwell (born 1959), British-born character actress with strong Irish family ties
- Russell Conwell (1843–1925), American Baptist minister, orator, philanthropist, lawyer, and writer
- Tommy Conwell, American guitarist, songwriter and performer
- Tony Conwell (1932–2017), English footballer
- Wilfred Conwell Bain (1908–1997), American music educator and an opera theater director

== See also ==
- Conwell–Egan Catholic High School, coeducational Catholic high school in Fairless Hills, Pennsylvania
- Gordon–Conwell Theological Seminary (GCTS) is an evangelical theological seminary in South Hamilton, Massachusetts
