= Louis-Joseph Pigeon =

Canadian politician

Member of Parliament for Joliette—L'Assomption—Montcalm
- In office March 1958 – September 1965

Personal details
- Born: 7 July 1922 Pointe-aux-Trembles, Quebec
- Died: 2 March 1993 (aged 70) Montreal, Quebec
- Party: Progressive Conservative
- Profession: agrologist

Louis-Joseph Pigeon (7 July 1922 – 2 March 1993) was a Progressive Conservative party member of the House of Commons of Canada. He was an agrologist by career, and worked for the Liberal minister of labour during the St Laurent government.

He was first elected at the Joliette—L'Assomption—Montcalm riding in the 1958 general election and re-elected there for successive terms in 1962 and 1963. After completing his third and final term, the 26th Canadian Parliament, Pigeon left the House of Commons and did not seek further re-election.

In August 1962, he became Parliamentary Secretary to the Minister of Agriculture, a post he held until February 1963.
