= Urbain Lippé =

Canadian politician

Urbain Lippé (21 July 1831 – 20 December 1896) was a Quebec notary and political figure. He represented Joliette in the House of Commons of Canada from 1891 to 1896 as a Conservative member.

He was born in L'Assomption, Lower Canada, of German descent, and was educated at the college there. In 1870, he married Marie Louise Lèvesque. Lippé served as clerk for the circuit courts for Joliette district and Joliette county and for the lower court (Cour des Commissaires) at St-Jean de Matha.
