= Joliette, Quebec =

Joliette
- City
- Ville de Joliette
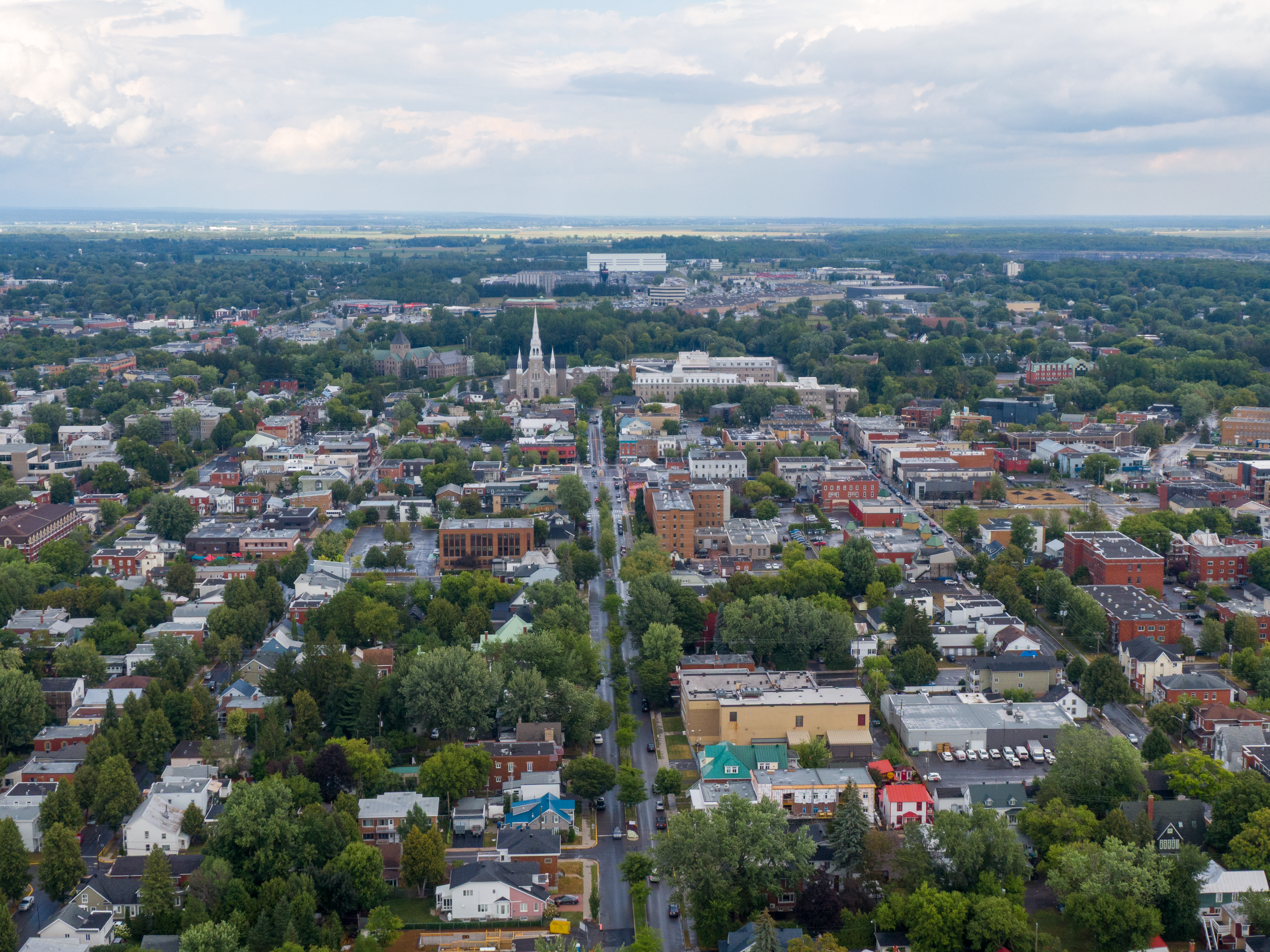
- Joliette in 2025

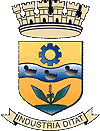
- Coat of arms

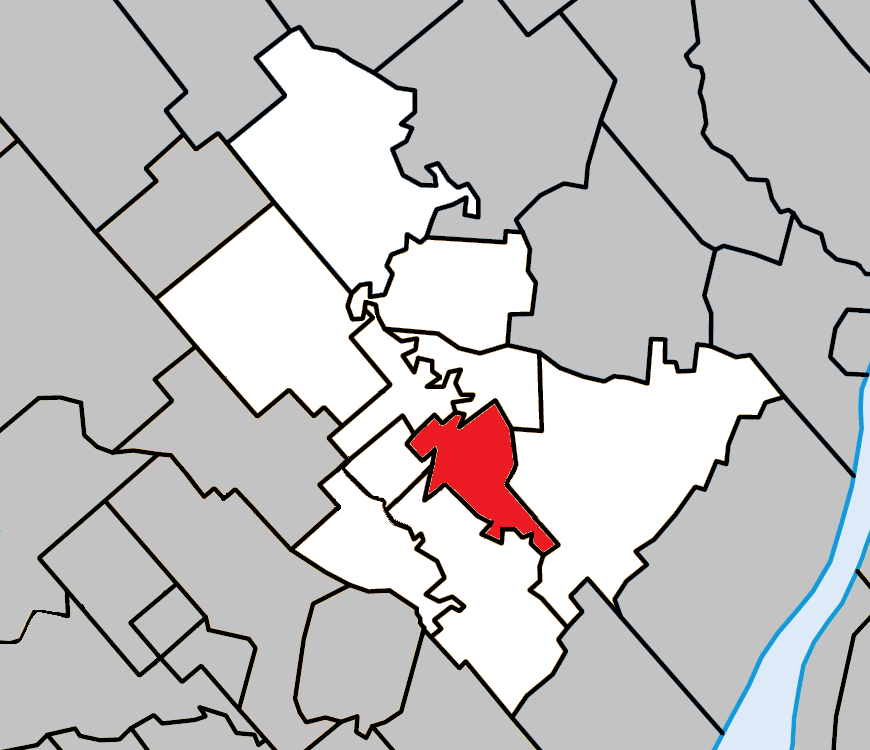
- Location within Joliette RCM

- Location in central Quebec.
- Coordinates: 46°01′N 73°27′W
- Country: Canada
- Province: Quebec
- Region: Lanaudière
- RCM: Joliette
- Constituted: November 12, 1966; 59 years ago

Government
  - Mayor: Pierre-Luc Bellerose
  - Federal riding: Joliette
  - Prov. riding: Joliette

Area
  - City: 23.60 km^{2} (9.11 sq mi)
  - Land: 22.96 km^{2} (8.86 sq mi)
  - Urban: 39.03 km^{2} (15.07 sq mi)
  - Metro: 108.66 km^{2} (41.95 sq mi)

Population (2021)
  - City: 21,384
  - Density: 891.8/km^{2} (2,310/sq mi)
  - Urban: 49,246
  - Urban density: 1,261.7/km^{2} (3,268/sq mi)
  - Metro: 52,706
  - Metro density: 485/km^{2} (1,260/sq mi)
  - Pop 2016-2021: ▲6.6%
  - Dwellings: 10,285
- Demonym(s): Joliettain, Joliettaine
- Time zone: UTC−5 (EST)
  - Summer (DST): UTC−4 (EDT)
- Postal code(s): J6E
- Area codes: 450 and 579
- Highways A-31: R-131; R-158; R-343
- Website: www.joliette.ca

Joliette (French pronunciation: [ʒɔljɛt]) is a city in southwest Quebec, Canada. It is approximately 50 kilometres (31 mi) northeast of Montreal, on the L'Assomption River. It is also the seat of the Regional County Municipality of Joliette. Founded in 1823 by Barthélemy Joliette and his wife Marie-Charlotte de Lanaudière. Joliette named it L'Industrie to "design [it] around economic activity, mills, land development and a desire to create a durable centre on the L’Assomption River." In 1863, the city incorporated, and changed its name to Joliette.

Considered part of the North Shore of Greater Montreal, the city is home to the Musée d'art de Joliette, which has a permanent collection of more than 8,300 works of art: paintings, sculpture, art on paper and a large collection of art from the French Middle Ages.

== Demographics ==
In the 2021 Census of Population, conducted by Statistics Canada, Joliette had a population of 21,384 living in 10,568 of its 11,153 total private dwellings, an increase of 4.4% from its 2016 population of 20,484. With a land area of 22.96 km^{2} (8.86 sq mi), it had a population density of 931.4/km^{2} (2,412.2/sq mi) in 2021.

Ethnic Identity	%	
Minorities		7.1
— Black	3.1	
— Latin American	1.7	
— Arab	1.3	
— Indigenous	2.4	
White/European		90.5

Mother Tongue	%
French	92.3
Spanish	1.2
English	1.1
Arabic	0.8
Atikamekw	0.5
Bilingual: French-English	1.0
Bilingual: French and non-official language	0.9

Religious Practice	%
Christian	65.6*
Catholic	58.2
Christian n.o.s.	4.7
Protestants	0.7
Christian other	1.9
Non-religious or Secular	31.3
Islam	2.4
Buddhism	0.3
All other religions or spiritual traditions	0.5
_{*Down from 85.4% in 2011.}	

== Government and infrastructure ==
Joliette is the seat of the judicial district of Joliette.The Joliette Institution for Women, a prison of the Correctional Service of Canada, is also located there.

== Economy ==
The city's economy is mainly in the manufacturing and service sectors. The largest gravel manufacturer in the area, Graybec, is located in Joliette and exploits a huge quarry just outside the city. In the center of the city is Galeries Joliette, which has nearly 100 retailers as well as a 5-storey office building.

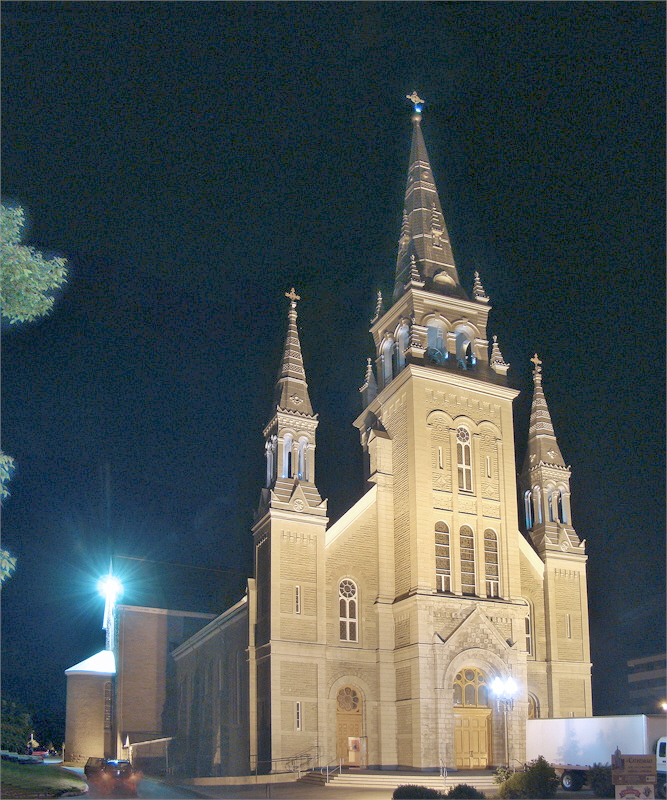
Saint-Charles-Borromée Cathedral

== Local institutions ==
Joliette has three Francophone high schools and one Anglophone high school, as well as the Joliette campus of the Cégep régional de Lanaudière.

Educational System

Francophone Cégep schools^{(a)}
— Collège Constituent de Joliette

Francophone public schools^{(b)}
— École Secondaire Thérèse-Martin
— École Secondaire Barthélemy-Joliette
— École Primaire Les Mélèzes
— École Primaire Saint-Pierre (Marie-Charlotte)

Francophone private schools^{(c)}
— Académie Antoine-Manseau

Anglophone public schools^{(d)}
— Joliette Elementary School in Saint-Charles-Borromée
— Joliette High School

Operated by: (a) Cégep régional de Lanaudière à Joliette; (b) Commission scolaire des Samares;

(c) Académie Antoine-Manseau; (d) Sir Wilfrid Laurier School Board

== Diocese ==
- Diocese of Joliette
- St. Charles Borromeo Cathedral

== Notable people ==
- Francine Racette - actress
- Charles Richard-Hamelin - concert pianist
- Paul Tellier - businessman and public servant
- Marie-Hélène Turcotte - animated film director and artist
- Guy Larose - professional wrestler

== Gallery ==
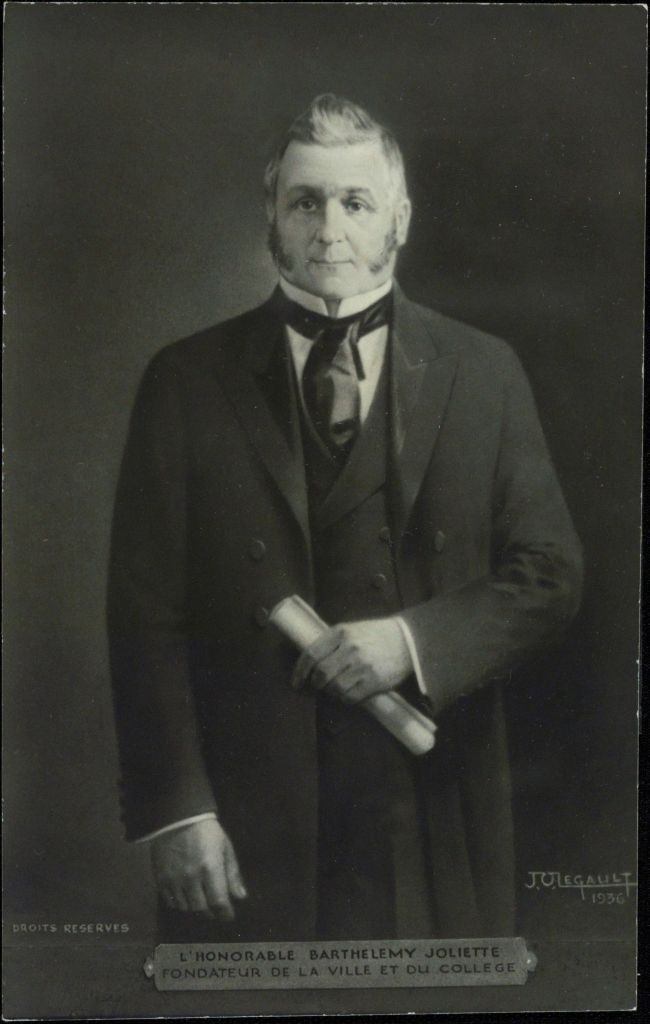
Portrait of businessman Barthélemy Joliette, postcard, 1936.

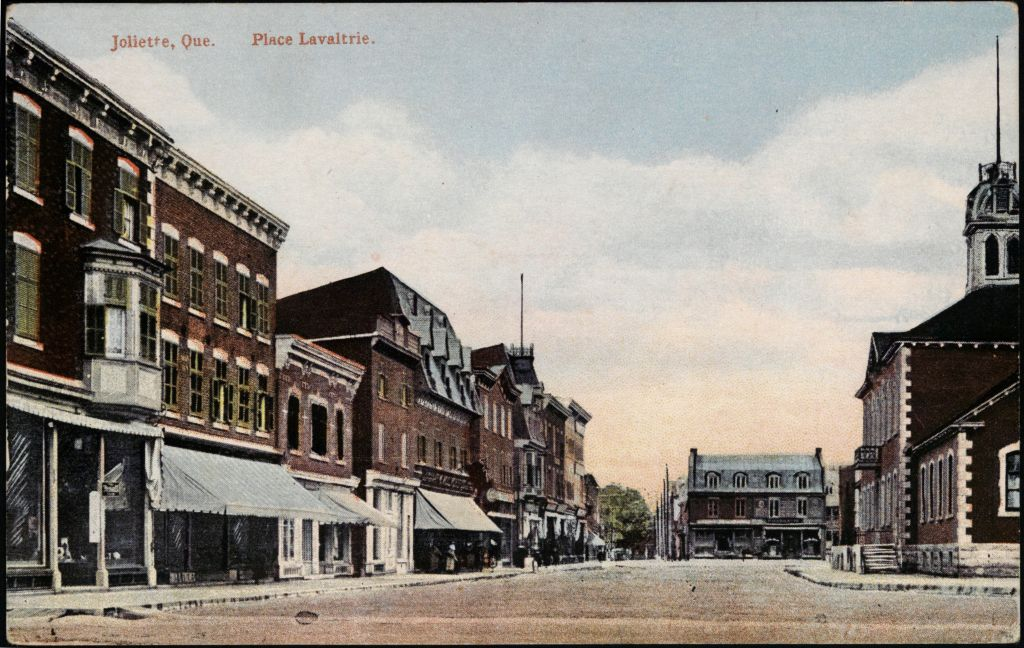
The village of Joliette, Place Lavaltrie, postcard, n.d.

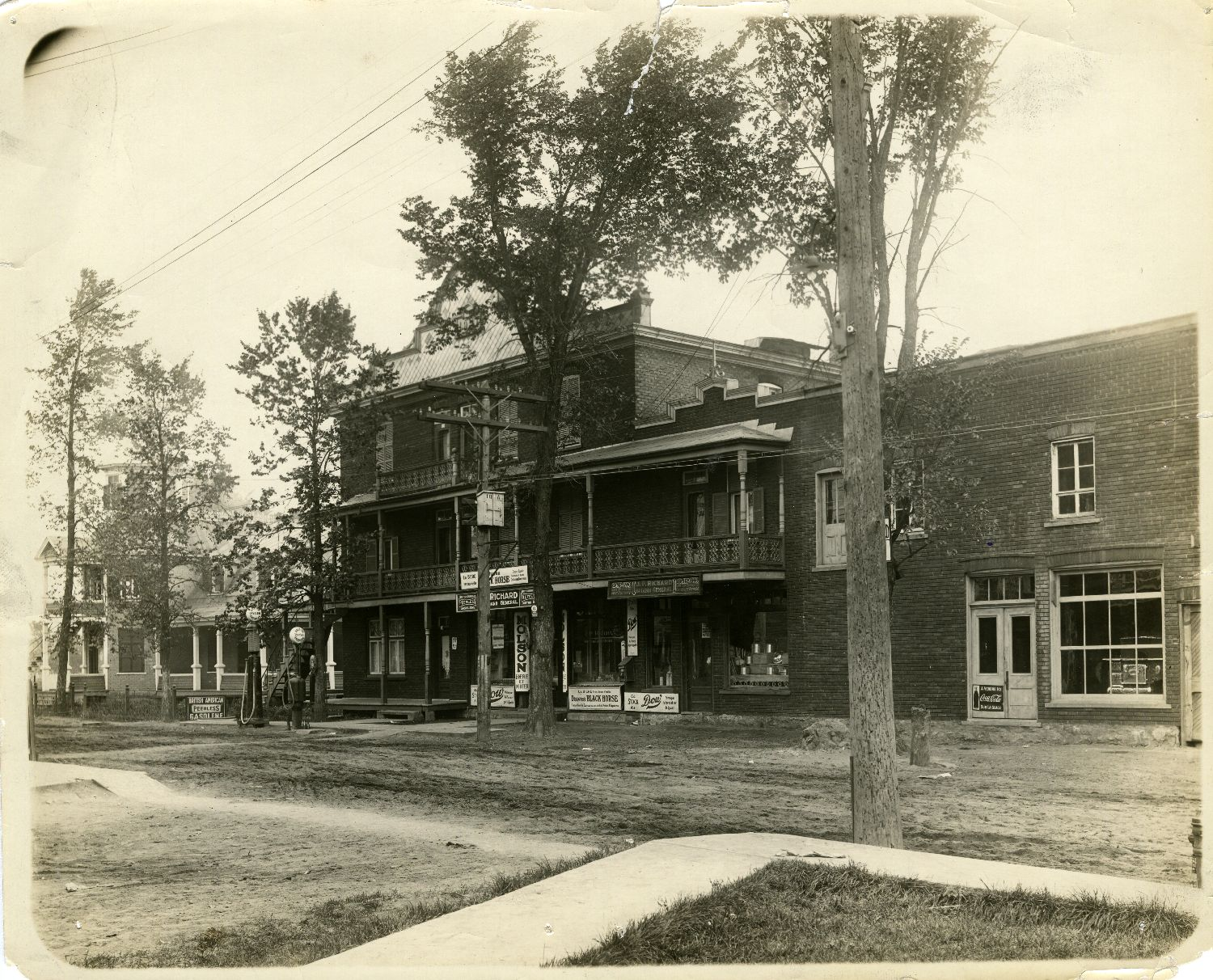
General store J.P. Richard, postcard, 1910.

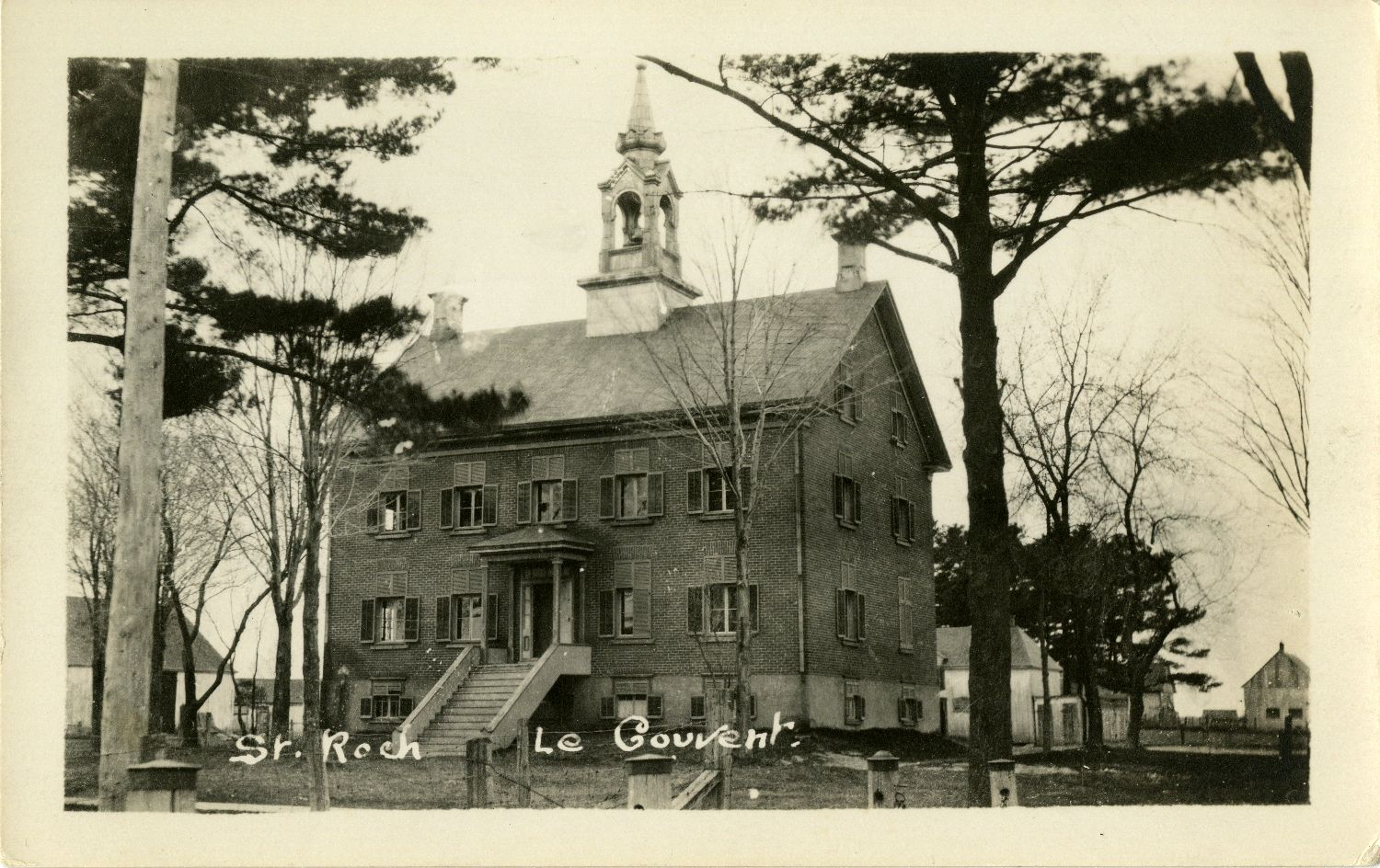
Sr. Roche le Couvent de Joliette, postcard, 1930.

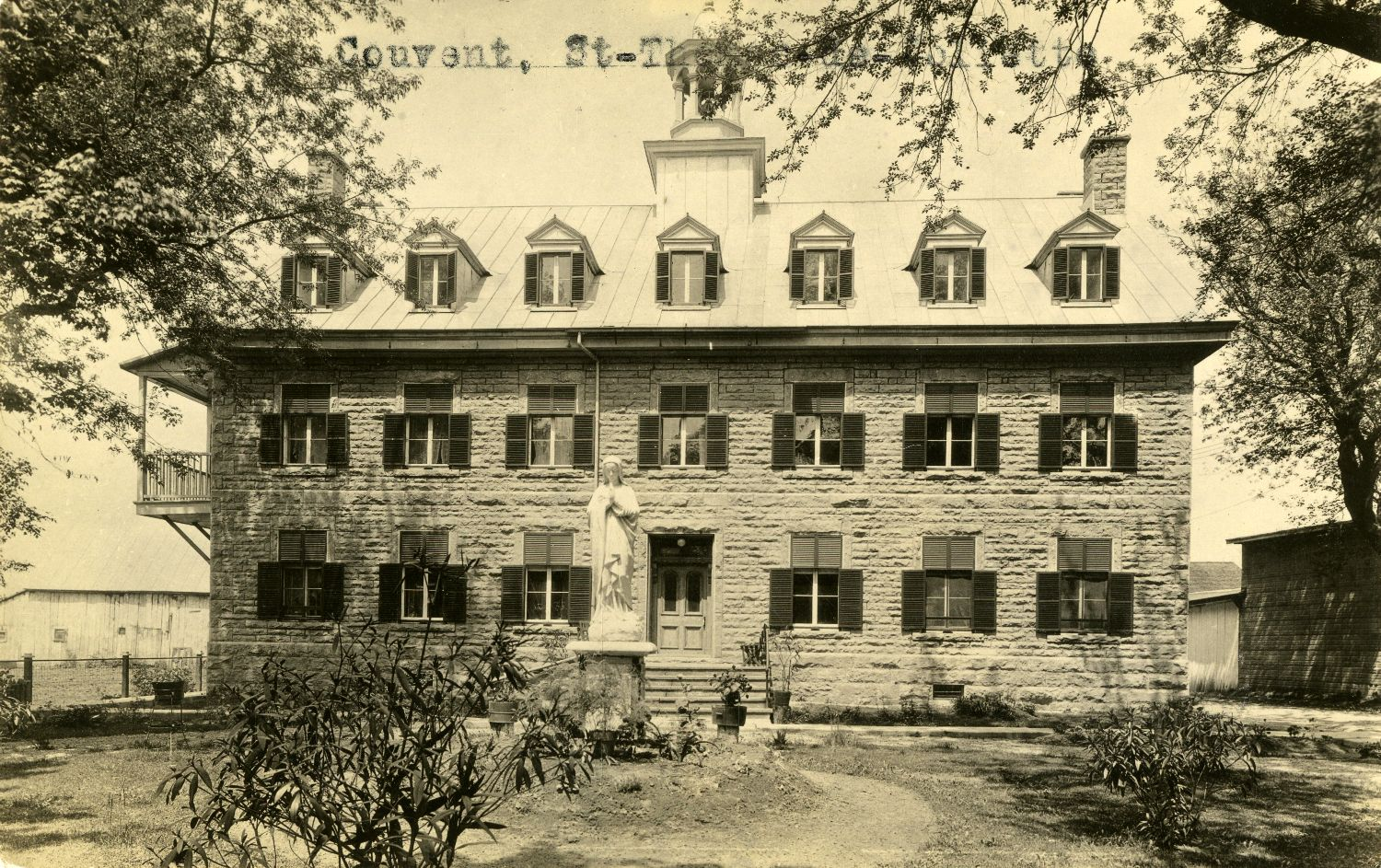
Couvent des soeurs de la Charité de la Providence de Saint-Thomas de Joliette, postcard, 1930.

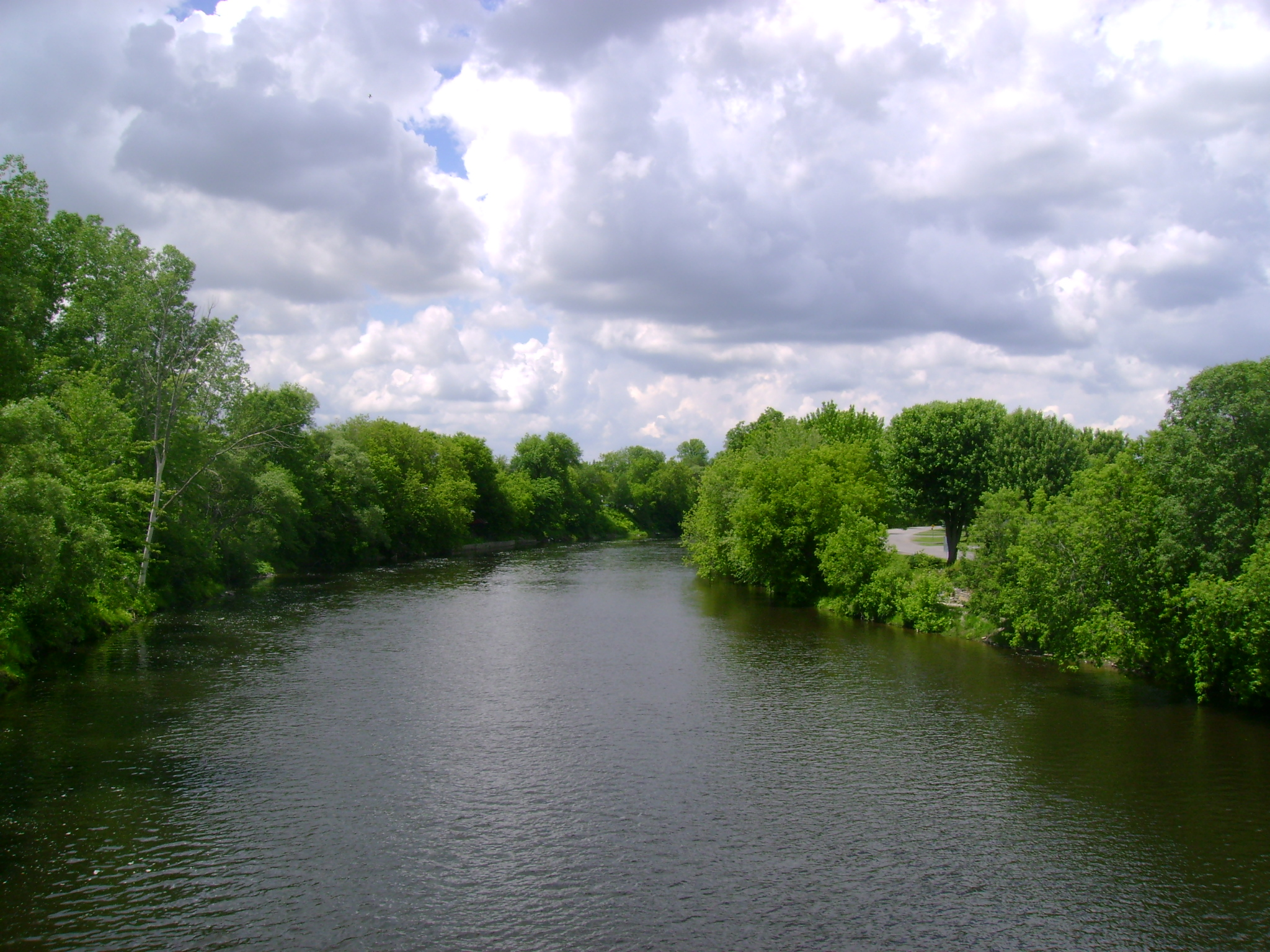
L’Assomption River seen from a bridge in Joliette, 2009.

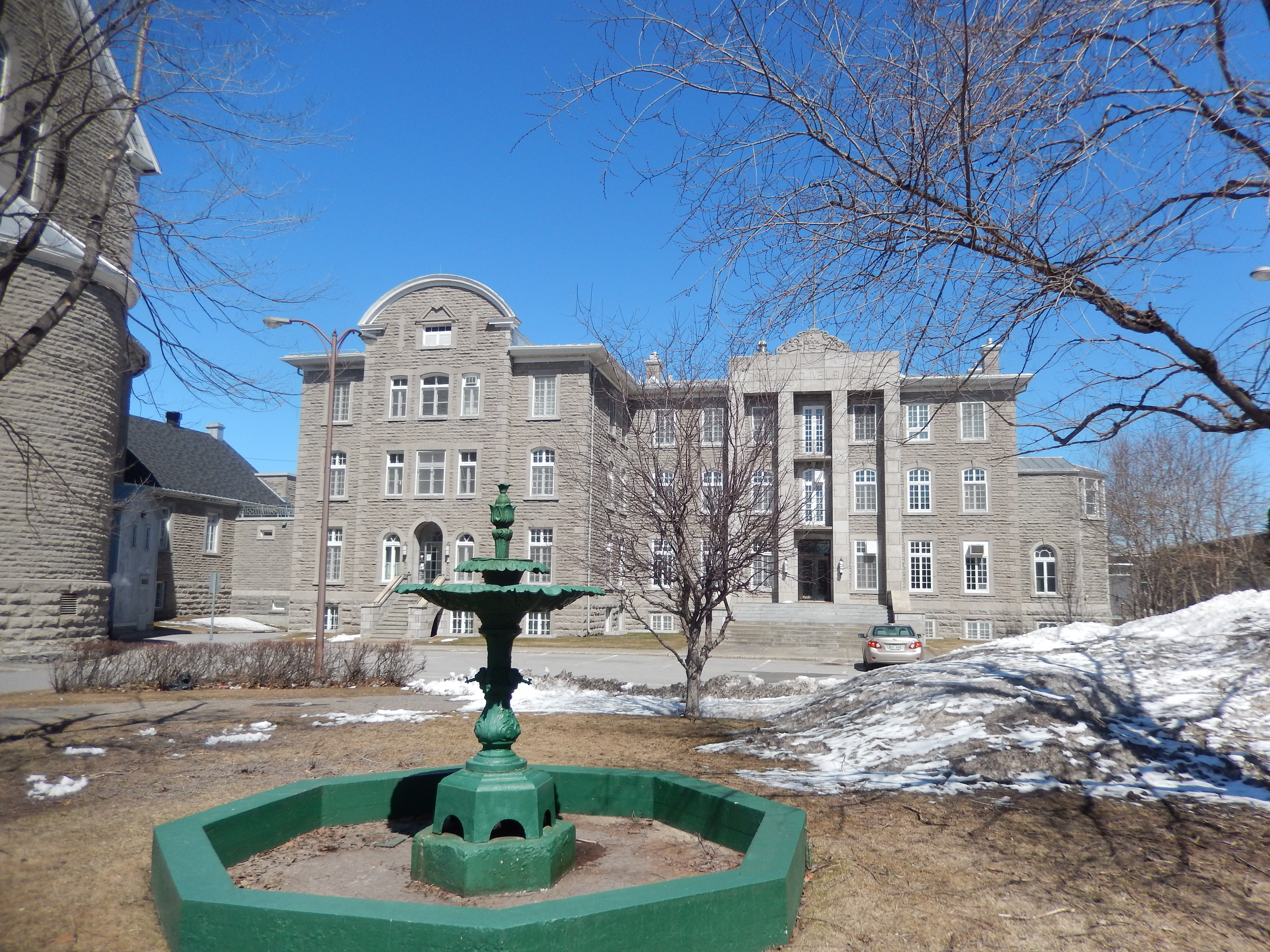
Joliette Bishropic, 2009.

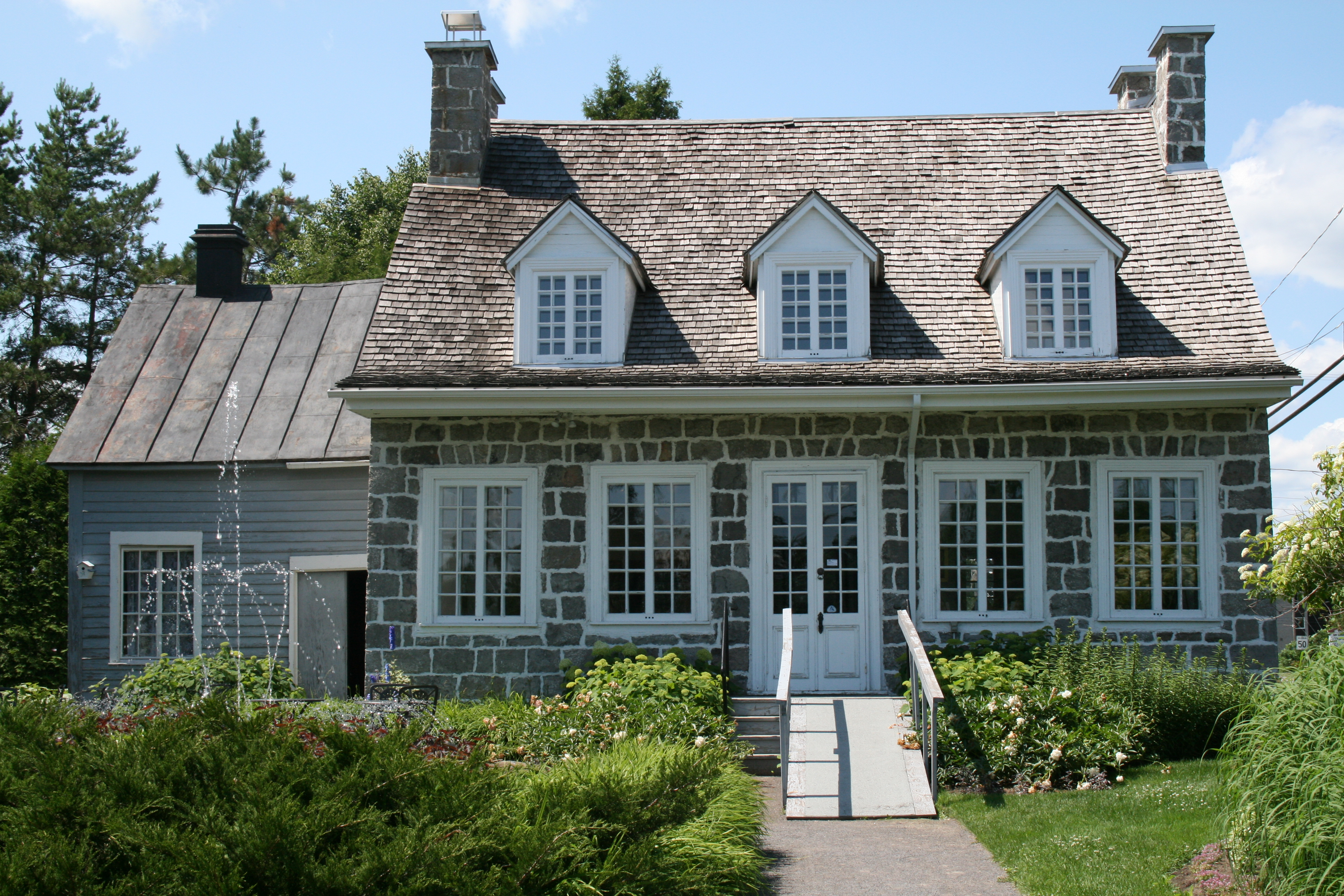
The Antoine-Lacombe House, built ca. 1840, located in Saint-Charles Borromée, and classified an historic monument. Photographed in 2008.

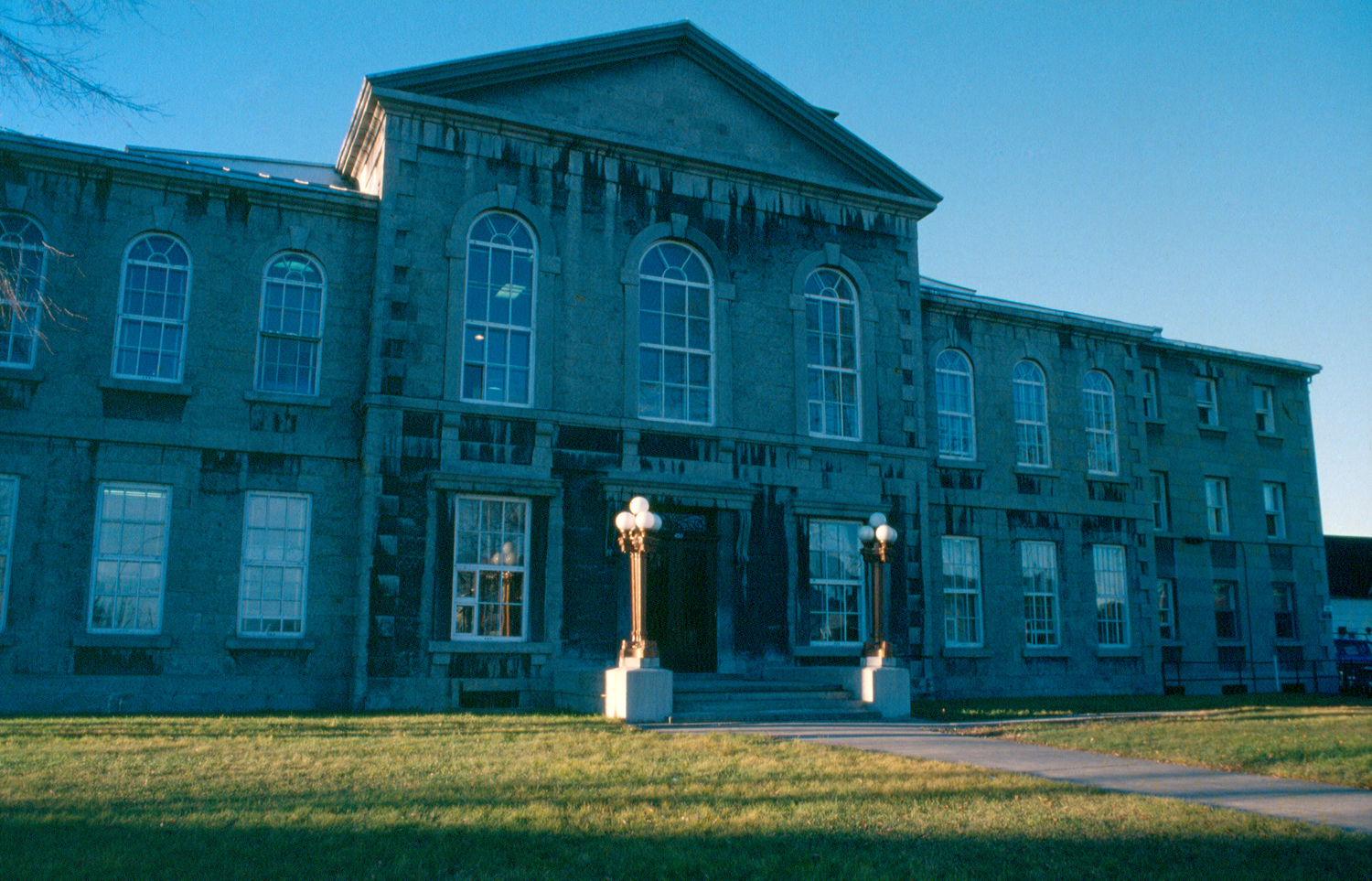
Facade of the local courthouse and prison, 1978.

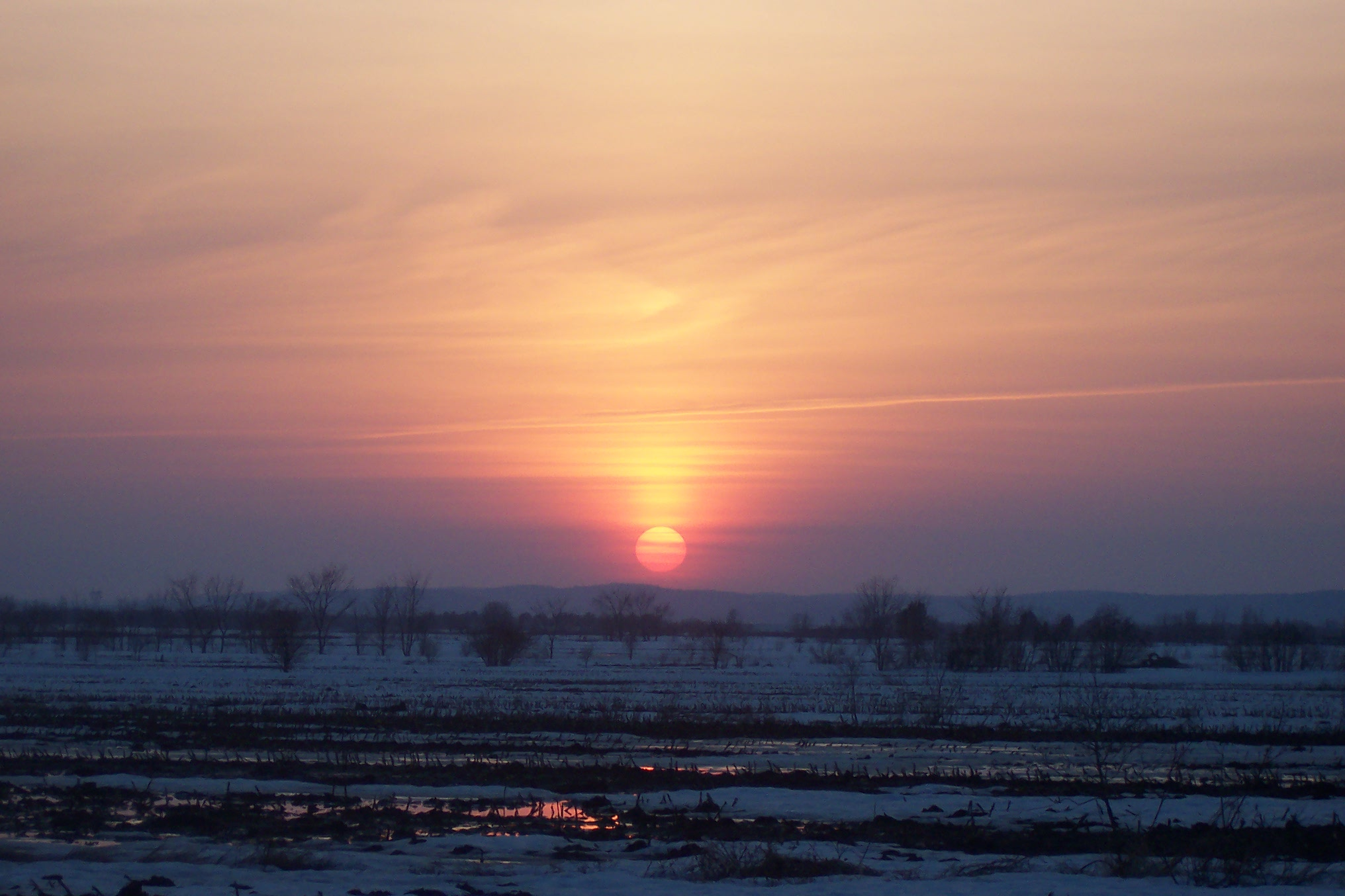
Joliette's sky in winter, 2008.

== See also ==
- List of cities in Quebec
