= Mégantic-Compton =

Former provincial electoral district in Quebec, Canada

Quebec electoral district

Defunct provincial electoral district
- Legislature: National Assembly of Quebec
- District created: 1972
- First contested: 1973
- Last contested: 2008

Demographics
- Population (2006): 44,624
- Electors (2008): 34,153
- Area (km²): 5,322.14
- Census division(s): Coaticook (part), Le Granit (part), Le Haut-Saint-François (all)
- Census subdivision(s): Ascot Corner, Audet, Bury, Chartierville, Cookshire-Eaton, Dixville, Dudswell, East Angus, East Hereford, Frontenac, Hampden, Lac-Drolet, Lac-Mégantic, Lambton, La Patrie, Lingwick, Marston, Martinville, Milan, Nantes, Newport, Notre-Dame-des-Bois, Piopolis, Saint-Augustin-de-Woburn, Sainte-Cécile-de-Whitton, Sainte-Edwidge-de-Clifton, Saint-Herménégilde, Saint-Isidore-de-Clifton, Saint-Malo, Saint-Romain, Saint-Sébastien, Saint-Venant-de-Paquette, Scotstown, Stornoway, Stratford, Val-Racine, Weedon, Westbury

Megantic-Compton is a former provincial electoral district in the Estrie region of Quebec, Canada. As of its final election, it included the municipalities of East Angus, Cookshire-Eaton, Lac-Mégantic, Weedon, Lac-Drolet, and Chartierville.

It was created for the 1973 election from parts of Frontenac, Compton, and Wolfe electoral districts; despite the name, it did not include any part of the territory of the former Mégantic electoral district. Its final election was in 2008. It disappeared in the 2012 election and the successor electoral district was the recreated Mégantic.

== Members of National Assembly ==
Legislature	Years	Member	Party
Riding created from Frontenac, Compton, and Wolfe
30th	1973–1976	Omer Dionne	Liberal
31st	1976–1980	Fernand Grenier	Union Nationale
31st	1980–1981	Fabien Bélanger	Liberal
32nd	1981–1983	Fabien Bélanger	Liberal
32nd	1983–1985	Madeleine Bélanger	Liberal
33rd	1985–1989	Madeleine Bélanger	Liberal
34th	1989–1994	Madeleine Bélanger	Liberal
35th	1994–1998	Madeleine Bélanger	Liberal
36th	1998–2003	Madeleine Bélanger	Liberal
37th	2003–2004	Daniel Bouchard	Liberal
37th	2004–2007	Daniel Bouchard	Independent
38th	2007–2008	Johanne Gonthier	Liberal
39th	2008–2012	Johanne Gonthier	Liberal
Riding dissolved into Mégantic

== Election results ==
2008 Quebec general election
Party	Candidate	Votes	%	±%
Liberal	Johanne Gonthier	9,204	45.09	
Parti Québécois	Gloriane Blais	7,170	35.13	
Action démocratique	Samuel Therrien	3,268	16.01	
Québec solidaire	Julie Dionne	769	3.77	

2007 Quebec general election
Party	Candidate	Votes	%	±%
Liberal	Johanne Gonthier	8,701	32.98	
Action démocratique	Jocelyn Brouillette	7,861	32.12	
Parti Québécois	Gloriane Blais	7,095	28.99	
Green	Sébastien Lanctôt	904	3.69	–
Québec solidaire	Ludovick Nadeau	544	2.22	

2003 Quebec general election
Party	Candidate	Votes	%
Liberal	Daniel Bouchard	11,135	47.09
Parti Québécois	Suzanne Durivage	7,347	31.07
Action démocratique	Alain Boisvert	4,901	20.73
UFP	Christian Poulin	193	0.82
Equality	Frank Moller	71	0.30

1998 Quebec general election
Party	Candidate	Votes	%	±%
Liberal	Madeleine Bélanger	12,675	50.49	-3.46
Parti Québécois	Suzanne Durivage	10,339	41.18	-1.18
Action démocratique	Olivier Chalifoux	1,835	7.31	–
Socialist Democracy	Yves Couturier	174	0.69	–
Equality	Frank Moller	81	0.32	-1.50
Total valid votes		25,104	99.01	
Rejected and declined votes		250	0.99	-1.07
Turnout		25,354	79.89	-1.14
Electors on the lists		31,736		
Source: Official Results, Government of Quebec
Liberal hold		Swing		-2.32

1995 Quebec referendum
Side	Votes	%
Non	14,535	52.71
Oui	13,042	47.29

1994 Quebec general election
Party	Candidate	Votes	%	±%
Liberal	Madeleine Bélanger	12,799	53.95	-6.44
Parti Québécois	Jacques Blais	10,051	42.36	+12.44
Natural Law	Christian Simard	444	1.87	–
Equality	Matthew Begbie	432	1.82	-3.16
Total valid votes		23,725	97.94	
Rejected and declined votes		500	2.06	+0.55
Turnout		24,225	81.03	+4.32
Electors on the lists		29,896		
Source: Official Results, Government of Quebec
Liberal hold		Swing		-9.44

1989 Quebec general election
Party	Candidate	Votes	%	±%
Liberal	Madeleine Bélanger	12,608	60.39	+0.91
Parti Québécois	Léon Ducharme	6,246	29.92	-7.43
Equality	Frank Moller	1,039	4.98	–
Green	Pierre Gilbert	740	3.54	–
Parti 51	Edmond Trudeau	245	1.17	–
Total valid votes		20,878	98.49	
Rejected and declined votes		320	1.51	+0.41
Turnout		21,198	76.71	-0.68
Electors on the lists		27,634		
Source: Official Results, Government of Quebec
Liberal hold		Swing		+4.17

1985 Quebec general election
Party	Candidate	Votes	%	±%
Liberal	Madeleine Bélanger	12,865	59.48	-8.12
Parti Québécois	Maurice Bernier	8,708	37.35	+6.87
New Democratic	Joseph Lemoine	594	2.75	–
Christian Socialist	Steeve Stratford	91	0.42	–
Total valid votes		21,628	98.90	
Rejected and declined votes		241	1.10	+0.15
Turnout		21,869	77.39	+4.96
Electors on the lists		28,257		
Source: Official Results, Government of Quebec
Liberal hold		Swing		-7.50

Quebec provincial by-election, December 5, 1983
Party	Candidate	Votes	%	±%
Liberal	Madeleine Bélanger	13,711	67.60	+15.87
Parti Québécois	Noël Landry	6,182	30.48	-11.04
Independent	Jean-Luc Perron	233	1.15	–
No Affiliation	Patricia Métivier	156	0.77	–
Total valid votes		20,282	99.05	
Total rejected ballots		194	0.95	+0.23
Turnout		20,476	72.43	-9.61
Electors on the lists		28,270		
Liberal hold		Swing		+13.50
By-election due to the death of Fabien Bélanger
Source(s) "December 5, 1983 By-election". Chief Electoral Officer of Quebec. 5 December 1983.

1981 Quebec general election
Party	Candidate	Votes	%	±%
Liberal	Fabien Bélanger	11,795	51.73	
Parti Québécois	Noël Landry	9,468	41.52	
Union Nationale	Jacques Labranche	1,539	6.75	–

Mégantic-Compton by-election November 17, 1980
Party	Candidate	Votes	%	±%
Liberal	Fabien Bélanger	9,259	46.95	
Parti Québécois	Richard Labelle	7,135	36.18	
Union Nationale	Fernand Grenier	233	1.15	–
United Social Credit	Jean-Paul Poulin	156	0.77	

1980 Quebec referendum
Side	Votes	%
Non	15,202	65.23
Oui	8,102	34.77

1976 Quebec general election
Party	Candidate	Votes	%	±%
Union Nationale	Fernand Grenier	8,539	39.58	–
Liberal	J. Omer Dionne	6,037	27.99	
Parti Québécois	Richard Labelle	4,809	22.29	
Ralliement créditiste	Robert Leroux	2,188	10.14	

1973 Quebec general election
Party	Candidate	Votes	%	±%
Liberal	J. Omer Dionne	9,815	47.96	
Ralliement créditiste	Paul-André Latulippe	5,385	26.31	
Parti Québécois	Gérald Ouellette	2,819	13.78	
Union Nationale	Octave Grenier	2,445	11.95	–

== See also ==
- List of Quebec provincial electoral districts
- Canadian provincial electoral districts
