= Victoria River (lake Mégantic) =

River in Estrie, Quebec (Canada)

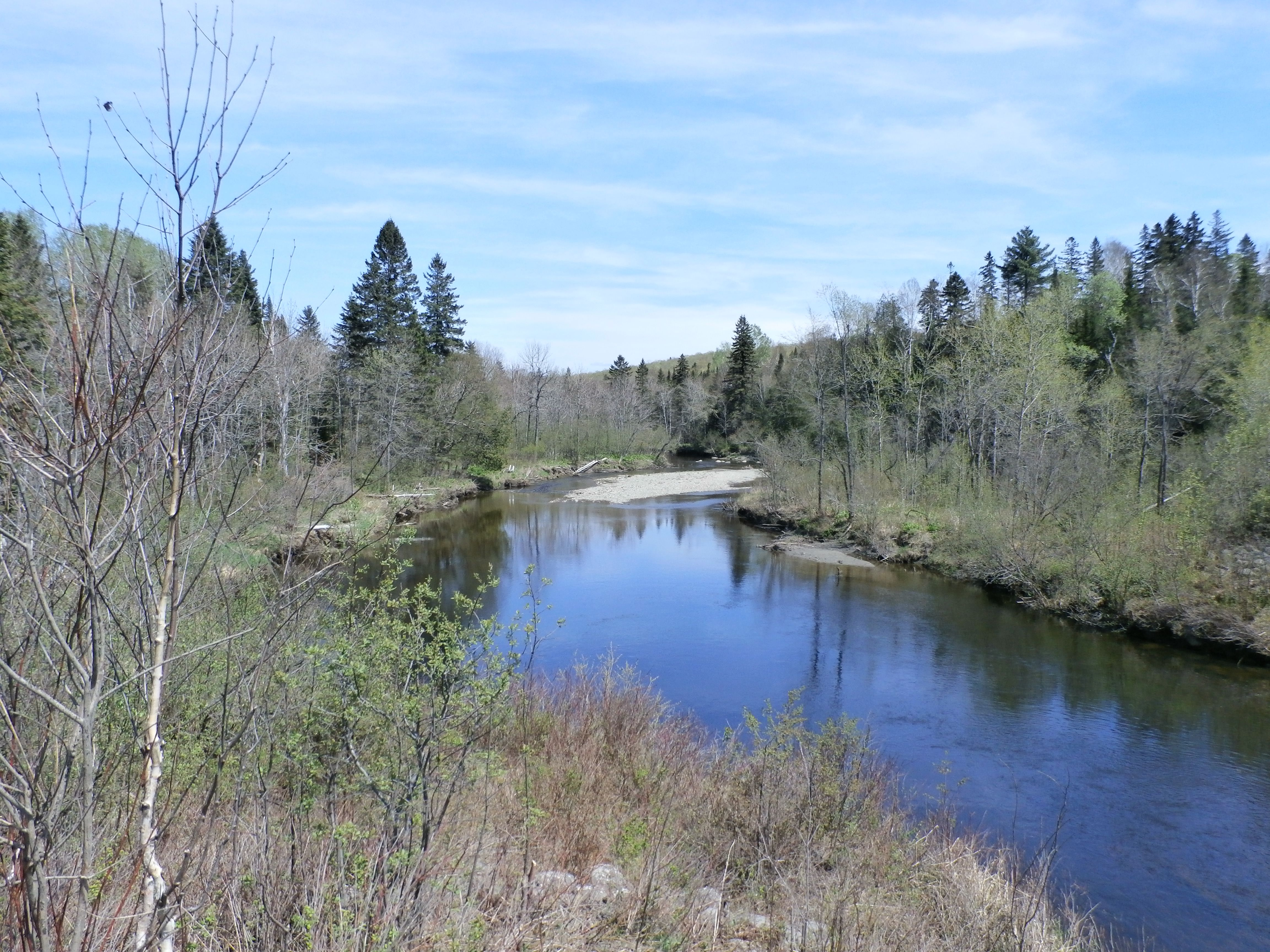
- Victoria River near lake Mégantic

- Location within Quebec
- Native name: Rivière Victoria (French)

Location
- Country: Canada
- Province: Quebec
- Region: Estrie
- MRC: Le Granit Regional County Municipality

Physical characteristics
- Source: Lake Noël
  - location: Val-Racine
  - coordinates: 45.444929°N 71.088961°W
  - elevation: 534 metres (1,752 ft)
- Mouth: Lake Mégantic, Chaudière River
  - location: Marston
  - coordinates: 45.539944°N 70.928746°W
  - elevation: 388 metres (1,273 ft)
- Length: 21.2 kilometres (13.2 mi)
- Basin size: 140.5 kilometres (87.30 mi)

Basin features
- Progression: Chaudière River, St. Lawrence River
- River system: St. Lawrence River
- Tributaries
  - left: (upstream) décharge du lac McKenzie, ruisseau Boucher, ruisseau Saint-Joseph
  - right: (upstream)

The Victoria River (in French: rivière Victoria) is a tributary of the Chaudière River, therefore a sub-tributary of the St. Lawrence River.

The Victoria River flows through the municipalities of Val-Racine, Piopolis and Marston, in the Le Granit Regional County Municipality, in the administrative region of Estrie, Quebec, Canada.

== Toponymy ==
The toponym of this watercourse was attributed around the middle of the XIXth in honor of Queen Victoria, whose reign extended from 1837 to 1901.

The toponym "Rivière Victoria" was formalized on December 5, 1968, at the Commission de toponymie du Québec.

== See also ==
- List of rivers of Quebec
