= Arnold River (lac aux Araignées) =

River in Estrie, Quebec (Canada)

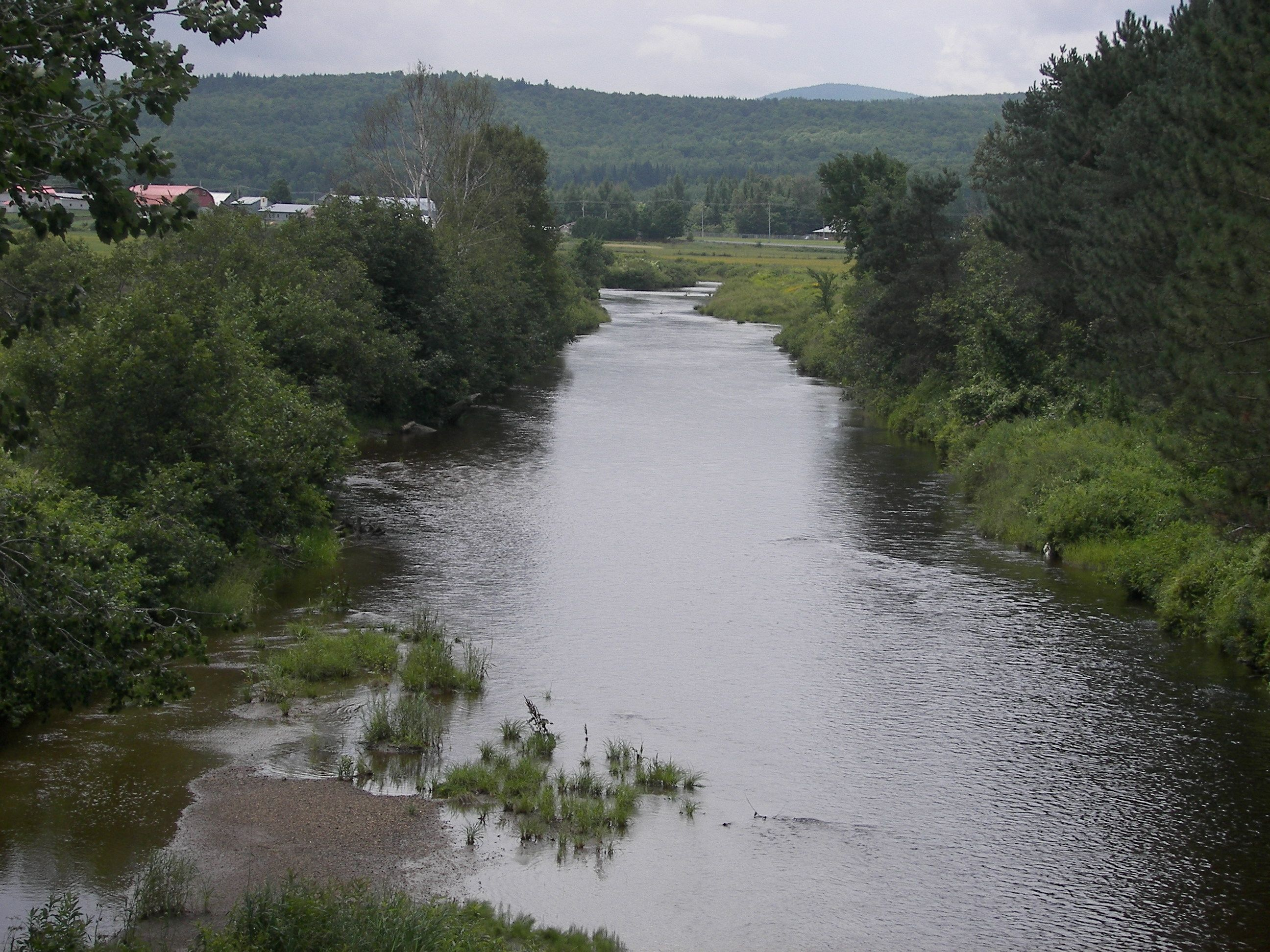
- Arnold River between Lac Mégantic and Woburn

- Location within Quebec
- Native name: Rivière Arnold (French)

Location
- Country: Canada
- Province: Quebec
- Region: Estrie
- MRC: Le Granit Regional County Municipality

Physical characteristics
- Source: Arnold Lake
  - location: Saint-Augustin-de-Woburn
  - coordinates: 45.476435°N 71.022988°W
  - elevation: 577 metres (1,893 ft)
- Mouth: Lake Mégantic, Chaudière River
  - location: Frontenac
  - coordinates: 45.45583°N 70.86528°W
  - elevation: 392 metres (1,286 ft)
- Length: 28.2 kilometres (17.5 mi)
- Basin size: 265 kilometres (164.66 mi)

Basin features
- Progression: Lake Mégantic, Chaudière River, St. Lawrence River
- River system: St. Lawrence River
- Tributaries
  - left: (upstream) Clinton River, ruisseau Saint-Joseph
  - right: (upstream) ruisseau Vaseux, ruisseau Morin, ruisseau Clearwater

The Arnold River is a tributary of the Lac des Joncs, which flows into Lake Mégantic. The latter, which also receives the discharge from the Lac aux Araignées, constitutes the main body of water at the head of the Chaudière River, which flows northward to empty on the south shore of the St. Lawrence River.

The Arnold River flows through the municipalities of Saint-Augustin-de-Woburn, Piopolis and Frontenac, in the Le Granit Regional County Municipality, in the administrative region of Estrie, in Quebec, in Canada.

== Geography ==
The main neighboring hydrographic slopes of the Arnold River are:

- north side: lake Mégantic, rivière aux Araignées;
- east side: rivière aux Araignées, Vaseux stream;
- south side: Morin Creek, Cupsuptic River (Cupsuptic River), (USA), Porter Brook (USA);
- west side: first east branch of the Magalloway River (USA), Deer Brook (USA), Bergeron River.

The Arnold River originates in Arnold Lake(length: 2.4 kilometres (1.5 mi) north–south direction; altitude: 754 metres (2,474 ft)). This lake is located in the southern part of the municipality of Saint-Augustin-de-Woburn. The mouth of this lake is located 4.8 kilometres (3.0 mi) south of the summit of Mont Gosford. This swampy lake straddles the Canada-US border. A dam was erected at its mouth, giving it the status of a lake. The average flow of the Arnold River is approximately 5 cubic metres per second (180 cu ft/s) and its watershed covers 265 kilometres (164.66 mi).

From Lake Arnold, the River Arnold flows on 28.2 kilometres (17.5 mi) divided into the following segments:

Upper course (segment de 17.8 kilometres (11.1 mi))

- 2.5 kilometres (1.6 mi) towards the north, to the mouth of the Morold Pond, which the current crosses for about one hundred meters;
- 2.8 kilometres (1.7 mi) north, to a stream (coming from the east);
- 3.3 kilometres (2.1 mi) north, to a stream (coming from the west);
- 4.9 kilometres (3.0 mi) eastward, up to the confluence of Morin brook (coming from the south);
- 3.2 kilometres (2.0 mi) north, to the limit of the township of Woburn;
- 1.1 kilometres (0.68 mi) north, to a road that it intersects at 0.6 kilometres (0.37 mi) east of the center of the village of Saint-Augustin-de-Woburn;

Lower course (segment de 10.4 kilometres (6.5 mi))

- 2.4 kilometres (1.5 mi) north-west, to the confluence of Vaseux stream (coming from the south-east);
- 0.6 kilometres (0.37 mi) towards the north-west, entering the until the confluence of Ruisseau Saint-Joseph (coming from the south);
- 1.7 kilometres (1.1 mi) north, to the limit of the townships of Clinton and Woburn;
- 0.7 kilometres (0.43 mi) north, winding to the start of the enlarged Arnold River area;
- 0.7 kilometres (0.43 mi) northward, to the confluence of the Clinton River (coming from the southwest);
- 0.5 kilometres (0.31 mi) northward, up to the limit between the municipalities of Saint-Augustin-de-Woburn and Piopolis;
- 3.8 kilometres (2.4 mi) north, to the outlet of Lac des Joncs.

The Arnold River empties on the south shore of the outlet of Lac des Joncs at 1.5 kilometres (0.93 mi) upstream from the confluence of the last, which empties on the south shore of lake Mégantic. The confluence of the Arnold River is located 7.2 kilometres (4.5 mi) north of the village center of Saint-Augustin-de-Woburn, at 1.5 kilometres (0.93 mi) at the east of the confluence of the Bergeron River and at 1.1 kilometres (0.68 mi) west of the western bay of lac aux Araignées.

== Toponymy ==
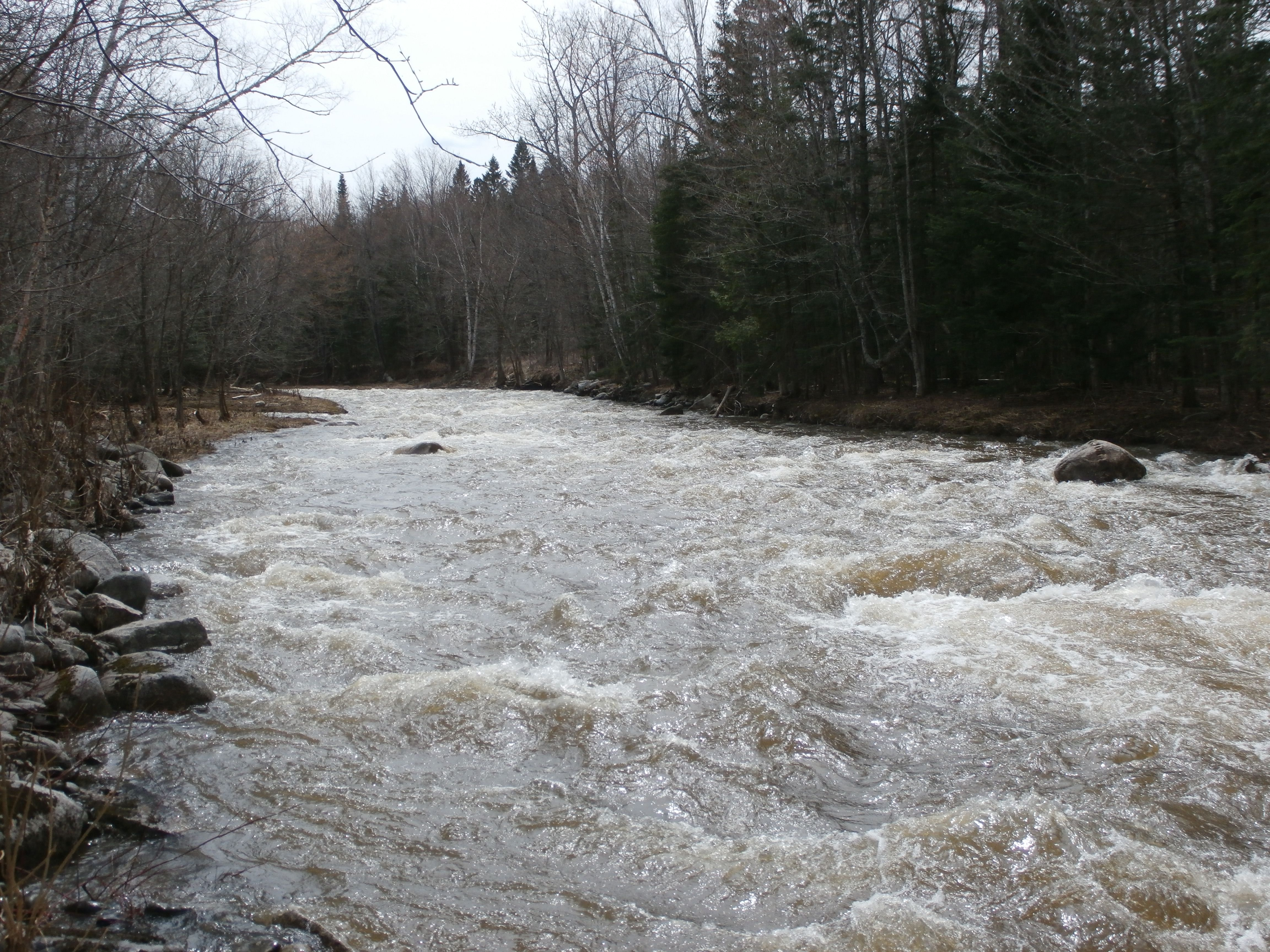
Arnold River upstream of Route 161 in Saint-Augustin-de-Woburn.

The name of the river recalls Benedict Arnold (1741–1801) who had the American army cross this river during the invasion of Canada in 1775, with the objective of capturing the Quebec (city).

Born in 1741 or 1742 in New England, Benedict Arnold chose the insurgent party at the start of the conflict between the thirteen American colonies and their mother country, England. In June 1775, Arnold went to Quebec to assess the defense system of the British authorities. Following the disclosure of its report, the American Congress decides to send its troops to seize the valley of the St. Lawrence River. Arnold then took the lead of one of the invading armies by taking the Arnold River, the rivière aux Araignées, Lake Mégantic and Chaudière River.

Its armies arrived in November 1775} on the south shore of the St. Lawrence River, opposite the city of Quebec (city). The considerable difficulties encountered by this expedition helped the English to rout the Americans before the walls of Quebec on the night of 30 to December 31, 1775. Transferred to Montreal, previously occupied by Montgomery, in April 1776, General Arnold must evacuate the city and return to the United States in June in the face of growing hostility from the Canadians and the arrival of British reinforcements. Arnold became commanding officer of West Point after the victory of Saratoga (1777) against Burgoyne. General Arnold is then at the heart of a plot and he is accused of treason to the American cause; he then fled to London where he died in 1801. Arnold is considered, after George Washington, as the best American general of that time.

The toponym "rivière Arnold" was made official on December 5, 1968, at the Commission de toponymie du Québec.

== See also ==
- List of rivers of Quebec
