= Clinton River (Arnold River tributary) =

River in Estrie, Quebec, Canada

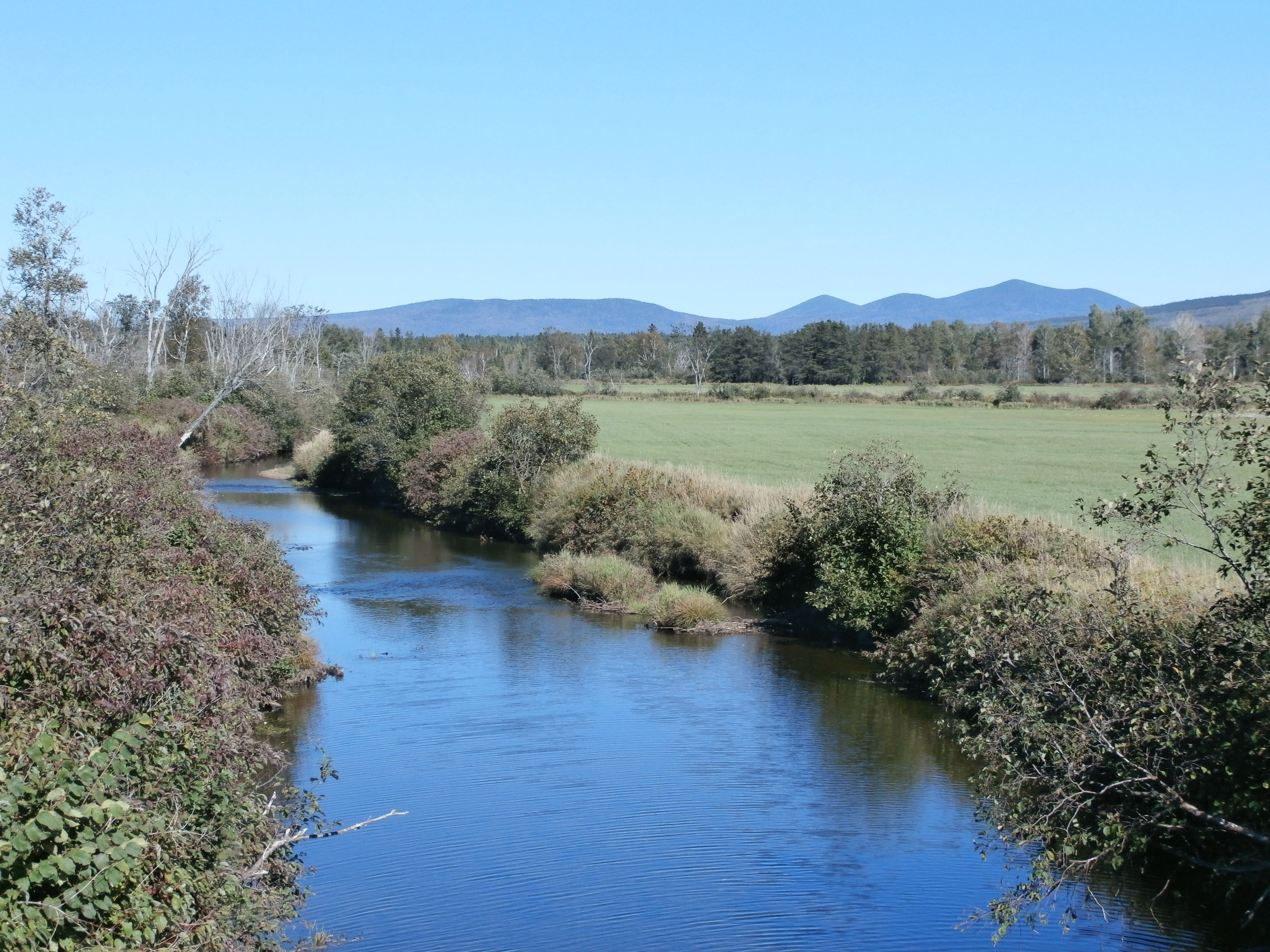
- Clinton River a few hundred meters before its confluence with the Arnold River, seen from Chemin de la Rivière-Bergeron

- Location within Quebec
- Native name: Rivière Clinton (French)

Location
- Country: Canada
- Province: Quebec
- Region: Estrie
- MRC: Le Granit Regional County Municipality

Physical characteristics
- Source: Mountain streams
  - location: Notre-Dame-des-Bois (canton de Chesham)
  - coordinates: 45.35535°N 71.000088°W
  - elevation: 597 metres (1,959 ft)
- Mouth: Arnold River
  - location: Saint-Augustin-de-Woburn
  - coordinates: 45.41883°N 70.86528°W
  - elevation: 395 metres (1,296 ft)
- Length: 21.8 kilometres (13.5 mi)
- Basin size: 265 kilometres (164.66 mi)

Basin features
- Progression: Rivière Arnold, Lake Mégantic, Chaudière River, St. Lawrence River
- River system: St. Lawrence River
- Tributaries
  - left: (upstream) Ruisseau du Mocassin
  - right: (upstream)

The Clinton River (in French: rivière Clinton) is a tributary of the Arnold River whose current flows northward and successively empties onto the south shore of the Lac des Joncs outlet, the south shore of lake Mégantic, the Chaudière River and the south shore of St. Lawrence River.

The Clinton River flows through the municipalities of Notre-Dame-des-Bois, Quebec, Saint-Augustin-de-Woburn and Piopolis, in the Le Granit Regional County Municipality, in the administrative region of Estrie, in Quebec, in Canada.

== Geography ==
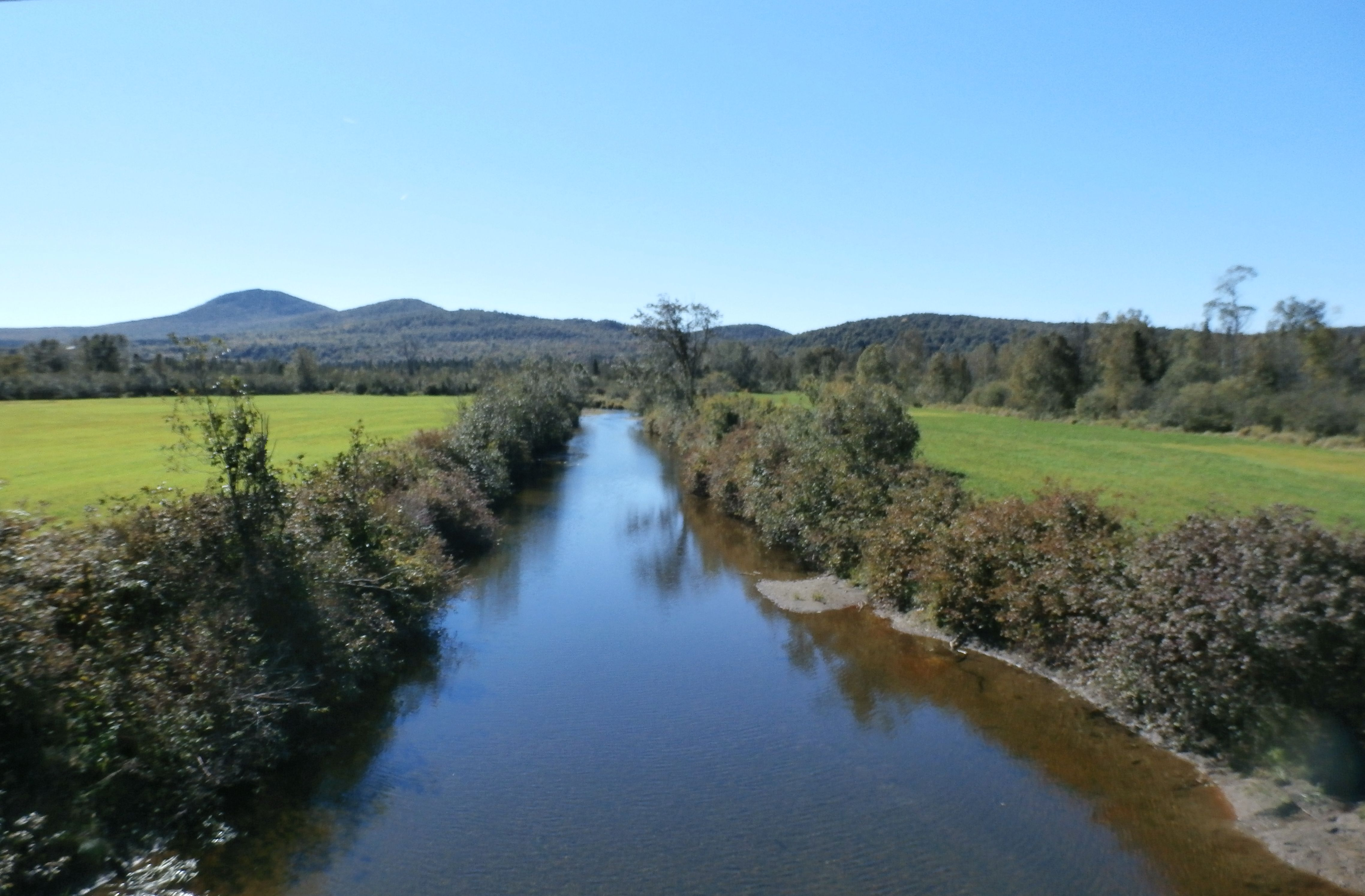
Clinton River upstream

The Clinton River originates at 2.0 kilometres (1.2 mi) northeast of the summit of Saddle Mountain, near the Canada–United States border, in the municipality of Notre-Dame-des-Bois.

From its source, the Clinton River flows over 21.8 kilometres (13.5 mi), divided into the following segments:

- 1.7 kilometres (1.1 mi) eastward in the township of Chesham, in the municipality of Notre-Dame-des-Bois, to the limit of the township of Woburn which belongs to Saint-Augustin-de-Woburn;
- 2.7 kilometres (1.7 mi) northeasterly, to the confluence of the "Mocassin brook" just before the route 212 bridge;
- 4.2 kilometres (2.6 mi) northeasterly, to the confluence of a stream, which originates near Mount Scotch (680 metres (2,230 ft)), and which comes from the southwest;
- 0.4 kilometres (0.25 mi) to the limit of the Township of Clinton;
- 4.9 kilometres (3.0 mi) northeasterly, to the confluence of a stream coming from the west;
- 1.6 kilometres (0.99 mi) towards the northeast, up to the limit of the municipality of Piopolis;
- 2.5 kilometres (1.6 mi) eastward, curving northward, in Piopolis;
- 2.8 kilometres (1.7 mi) towards the south-east, up to the confluence of a stream (coming from the south);
- 1.0 kilometre (0.62 mi) north-east, crossing the "Chemin de la rivière Bergeron", up to its confluence.

The river flows on the west bank into the Arnold River in a marshy area of about 5 kilometres (3.11 mi), between Piopolis and Saint-Augustin-de-Woburn; this confluence is located 4.2 kilometres (2.6 mi) before its confluence with the rivière aux Araignées which flows north-west to empty into lake Mégantic.

== Toponymy ==
The toponym rivière Clinton was made official on December 5, 1968, at the Commission de toponymie du Québec.

== See also ==
- List of rivers of Quebec
