= Johanne Gonthier =

Canadian politician

Member of the National Assembly of Quebec for Mégantic-Compton
- In office April 25, 2007 – September 4, 2012
- Preceded by: Daniel Bouchard
- Succeeded by: Ghislain Bolduc

Personal details
- Born: November 3, 1954 (age 71) Montreal, Quebec
- Party: Quebec Liberal Party
- Parent(s): Jules Gonthier; Madeleine Bélanger
- Portfolio: Natural Resources, Wildlife

Johanne Gonthier (born November 3, 1954, in Montreal, Quebec) is a former Canadian politician who served as a Member of the National Assembly of Quebec (MNA) for the riding of Mégantic-Compton from 2007 to 2012. She is the daughter of former MNA Madeleine Bélanger, who represented the same riding from 1983 to 2003. Gonthier represented the Quebec Liberal Party

Prior to entering politics, Gonthier worked in public relations and marketing for 20 years and was the director of the Chambre de Commerce de la région de Mégantic (Lac-Megantic region Chamber of Commerce) from 2003 to 2007. She was narrowly elected in the 2007 election and served as Parliamentary Secretary to the Minister of Natural Resources and Wildlife, a portfolio held by Claude Béchard, from 2007 to 2008. She was re-elected in 2008 and served as Parliamentary Secretary to the Minister of Employment and Social Solidarity from 2009 to 2012. She did not run for re-election in 2012.
