= Bergeron River =

River in Estrie, Quebec (Canada)

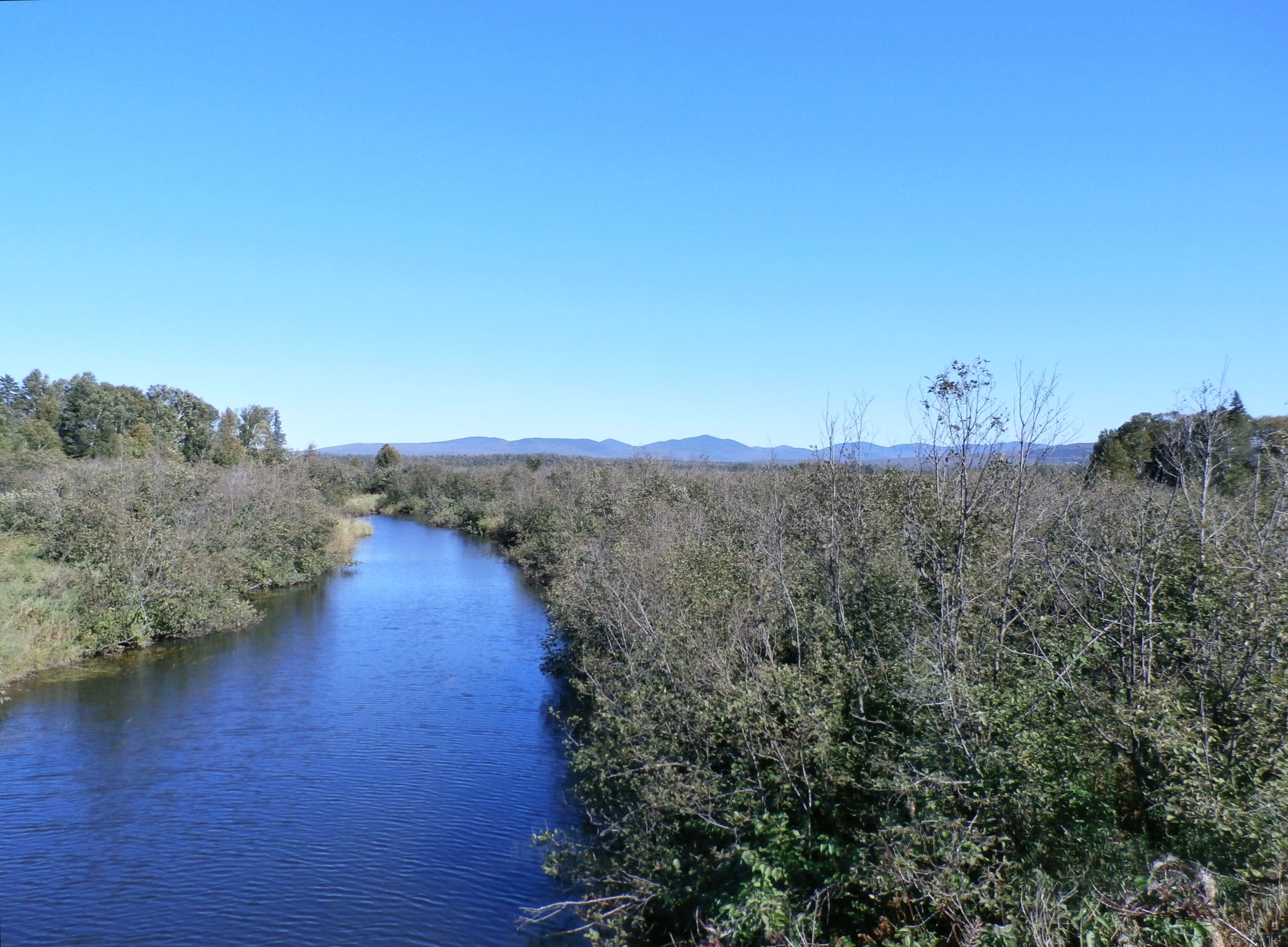
- Bergeron River at the confluence of Lac Mégantic.

- Location within Quebec
- Native name: Rivière Bergeron (French)

Location
- Country: Canada
- Province: Quebec
- Region: Estrie
- MRC: Le Granit Regional County Municipality

Physical characteristics
- Source: Little mountain stream
  - location: Val-Racine
  - coordinates: 45.476435°N 71.022988°W
  - elevation: 577 metres (1,893 ft)
- Mouth: Lake Mégantic, Chaudière River
  - location: Piopolis
  - coordinates: 45.45483°N 70.88528°W
  - elevation: 395 metres (1,296 ft)
- Length: 12.8 kilometres (8.0 mi)
- Basin size: 55.5 kilometres (34.49 mi)

Basin features
- Progression: Chaudière River, St. Lawrence River
- River system: St. Lawrence River
- Tributaries
  - left: (upstream)
  - right: (upstream)

The Bergeron river (in French: rivière Bergeron) is a tributary on the south shore of Lake Mégantic which flows into the Chaudière River; the latter flows northward to empty on the south shore of the St. Lawrence River.

The Bergeron river flows in the municipalities of Val-Racine and Piopolis, in the Le Granit Regional County Municipality, in the administrative region of Estrie, in Quebec, in Canada.

== Geography ==
The Bergeron River has its source in a mountain area east of Mont Mégantic in the municipality of Val-Racine at approximately 0.4 kilometres (0.25 mi) west of the boundary of the municipality of Piopolis.

From its source, the Bergeron River flows in a forest zone over 12.8 kilometres (8.0 mi) divided into the following segments:

- 0.5 kilometres (0.31 mi) towards the south-east, up to the limit of the municipality of Piopolis;
- 9.6 kilometres (6.0 mi) easterly in Marston Township, to the limit of Clinton Township;
- 2.7 kilometres (1.7 mi) eastward in Clinton Township, crossing route 263, to its confluence.

== Toponymy ==
The toponym "rivière Bergeron" was made official on December 5, 1968, at the Commission de toponymie du Québec.

== See also ==
- List of rivers of Quebec
