= Patrice Tardif =

Patrice Tardif may refer to:

- Patrice Tardif (ice hockey)
- Patrice Tardif (politician)
