= Paul-André Latulippe =

Canadian politician

Paul-André Latulippe was a politician in Quebec, Canada and a Member of the National Assembly of Quebec (MNA).

== Background ==
He was born in Lac-Mégantic, Quebec on May 25, 1941, and made career in the furniture industry. He was the son of Social Credit politician Henry Latulippe.

== Provincial politics ==
Latulippe ran as a candidate of the Ralliement créditiste in the 1970 election and won, becoming the Member of the National Assembly for the district of Frontenac.

During his term of office, the party was plagued by internal divisions. While three MNAs remained loyal to Leader Camil Samson, Latulippe and the rest of the caucus withdrew their support and appointed Armand Bois as temporary leader, until a leadership convention could determine a new leader.

Eventually, the Samson faction re-joined the party and Yvon Dupuis was chosen as leader. Nonetheless, Latulippe was defeated and finished second in the district of Mégantic-Compton in the 1973 election.

== See also ==
- History of Quebec

National Assembly of Quebec
Preceded by Fernand Grenier (Union Nationale)	MNA for Frontenac; 1970–1973	Succeeded by Henri Lecours (Liberal)
