= Ruisseau Saint-Joseph =

River in Estrie, Quebec, Canada

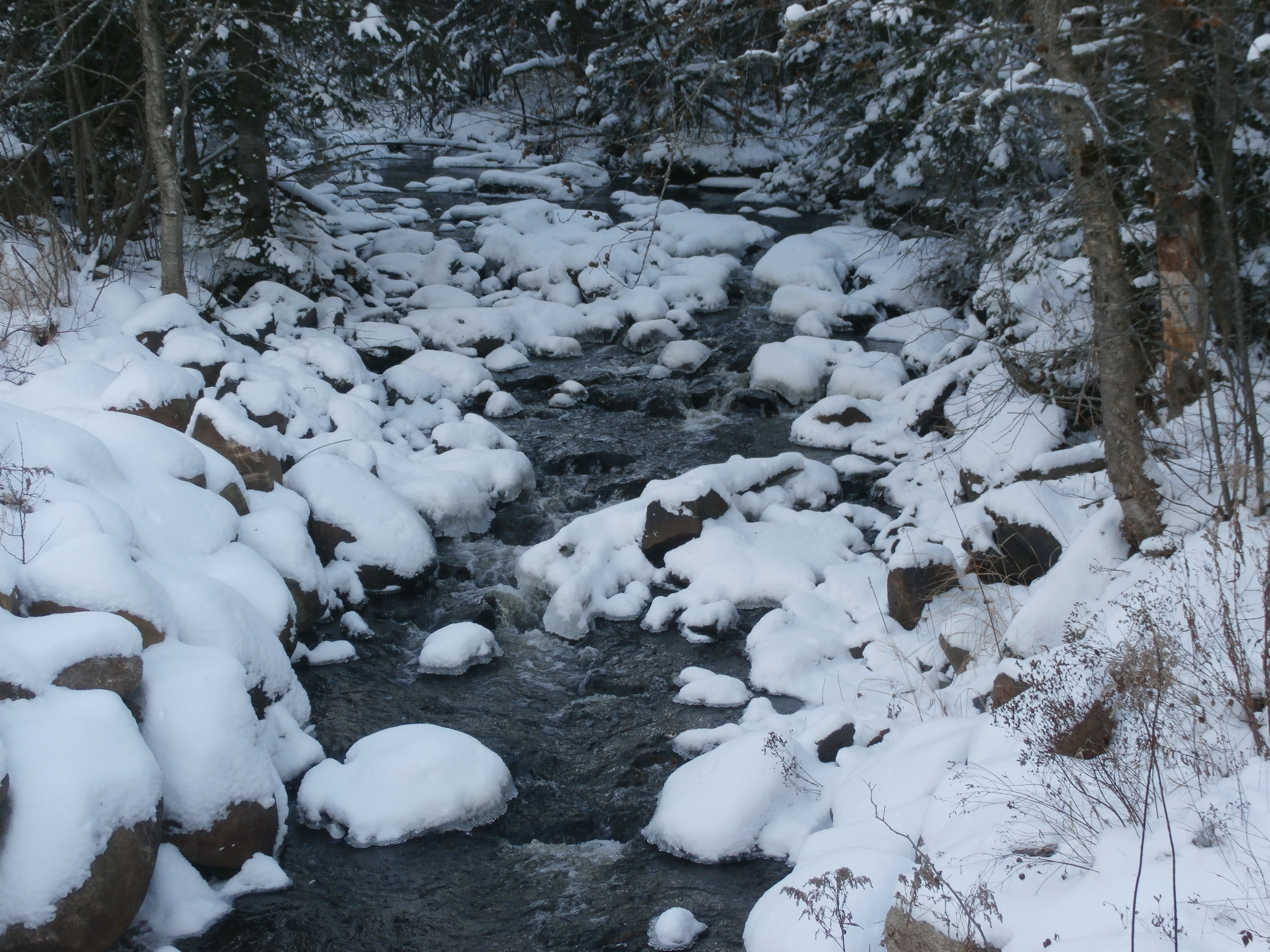
- Ruisseau St-Joseph

- Location within Quebec

Location
- Country: Canada
- Province: Quebec
- Region: Estrie
- MRC: Le Granit Regional County Municipality

Physical characteristics
- Source: Mountain streams
  - location: Saint-Augustin-de-Woburn
  - coordinates: 45.466435°N 71.012988°W
  - elevation: 600 metres (2,000 ft)
- Mouth: Lake Mégantic, Chaudière River
  - location: Saint-Augustin-de-Woburn
  - coordinates: 45.44483°N 70.88428°W
  - elevation: 395 metres (1,296 ft)
- Length: 7 kilometres (4.3 mi)

Basin features
- Progression: Lake Mégantic, Chaudière River, St. Lawrence River
- River system: St. Lawrence River
- Tributaries
  - left: (upstream)
  - right: (upstream)

The ruisseau Saint-Joseph (in English: Saint-Joseph stream) is a tributary on the south shore of Lake Mégantic which flows into the Chaudière River; the latter flows northward to empty on the south shore of the St. Lawrence River. The stream flows in the municipality of Saint-Augustin-de-Woburn, in the Le Granit Regional County Municipality, in the administrative region of Estrie, in Quebec, in Canada.

== Toponymy ==
The toponym Ruisseau Saint-Joseph was made official on October 19, 1971, at the Commission de toponymie du Québec.

== See also ==
- List of rivers of Quebec
