= Saint-Sébastien, Quebec =

Saint-Sébastien, Quebec can refer to:

- Saint-Sébastien, Estrie, Quebec, in Le Granit Regional County Municipality
- Saint-Sébastien, Montérégie, Quebec, in Le Haut-Richelieu Regional County Municipality
