= Clinton River (disambiguation) =

The Clinton River is a stream in the U.S. state of Michigan.

Clinton River may also refer to:

- Clinton River (New Zealand), a stream in the Southland Region of the South Island of New Zealand
- Clinton River (Arnold River tributary), a stream in Estrie, Quebec, Canada
