= Joseph Demers =

Joseph Demers may refer to:

- Joseph Demers (Quebec MLA) (1861–1936), member of the Legislative Assembly of Quebec, representing Mégantic from 1912 to 1916
- Joseph Demers (Quebec MP) (1871–1940), member of the Canadian Parliament, representing St. Johns—Iberville from 1906 to 1922
