= Madeleine Bélanger =

Canadian politician

Member of the National Assembly of Quebec for Mégantic-Compton
- In office December 5, 1983 – April 14, 2003
- Preceded by: Fabien Bélanger
- Succeeded by: Daniel Bouchard

Personal details
- Born: April 7, 1932 (age 94) Saint-Sébastien, Quebec, Canada
- Party: Quebec Liberal Party
- Spouse(s): Jules Gonthier; Fabien Bélanger (1973-1983)
- Children: Johanne Gonthier
- Profession: Educator

Madeleine Bélanger (née Audet; born April 7, 1932) is a Canadian politician who served as a Member of the National Assembly of Quebec (MNA) for the riding of Mégantic-Compton from 1983 until 2003. Following the death of her second husband, Fabien Bélanger, on October 2, 1983, she was elected as his replacement on December 5, 1983. She served as a member of the Quebec Liberal Party.

Bélanger's daughter, Johanne Gonthier, served as the Liberal MNA for the same riding from 2007 to 2012. Bélanger's nephew, Gérard Gosselin, served as a Parti Québécois MNA for Sherbrooke from 1976 to 1981.

== Biography ==
Bélanger was born April 7, 1932, in Saint-Sébastien, Quebec to Léopold Audet, a farmer, and Zélia Saint-Pierre. She worked as an elementary school teacher at Saint-Samuel-Station for three years. She owned two hairdressing salons and worked as an administrator and manager of a home electrical installation company for three years, then as a director of two residential development companies.

== Political career ==
Bélanger's husband, Fabien Bélanger, died suddenly on October 2, 1983. She secured the Liberal nomination for Mégantic-Compton and won the ensuing by-election. She was re-elected in 1985, 1989, 1994 and 1998. Bélanger served as Parliamentary Assistant to the Minister of Municipal Affairs during the brief government of Daniel Johnson Jr. and later became Chair of the Committee on Planning and the Public Domain as well as the Chairperson of the Committee on Education during her time in office.

She did not seek re-election in 2003.

== Electoral record ==
=== Provincial ===
1998 Quebec general election: Mégantic-Compton
Party	Candidate	Votes	%	±%
Liberal	Madeleine Bélanger	12,675	50.49	-3.46
Parti Québécois	Suzanne Durivage	10,339	41.18	-1.18
Action démocratique	Olivier Chalifoux	1,835	7.31	–
Socialist Democracy	Yves Couturier	174	0.69	–
Equality	Frank Moller	81	0.32	-1.50
Total valid votes		25,104	99.01	
Rejected and declined votes		250	0.99	-1.07
Turnout		25,354	79.89	-1.14
Electors on the lists		31,736		
Source: Official Results, Government of Quebec
Liberal hold		Swing		-2.32

1994 Quebec general election: Mégantic-Compton
Party	Candidate	Votes	%	±%
Liberal	Madeleine Bélanger	12,799	53.95	-6.44
Parti Québécois	Jacques Blais	10,051	42.36	+12.44
Natural Law	Christian Simard	444	1.87	–
Equality	Matthew Begbie	432	1.82	-3.16
Total valid votes		23,725	97.94	
Rejected and declined votes		500	2.06	+0.55
Turnout		24,225	81.03	+4.32
Electors on the lists		29,896		
Source: Official Results, Government of Quebec
Liberal hold		Swing		-9.44

1989 Quebec general election: Mégantic-Compton
Party	Candidate	Votes	%	±%
Liberal	Madeleine Bélanger	12,608	60.39	+0.91
Parti Québécois	Léon Ducharme	6,246	29.92	-7.43
Equality	Frank Moller	1,039	4.98	–
Green	Pierre Gilbert	740	3.54	–
Parti 51	Edmond Trudeau	245	1.17	–
Total valid votes		20,878	98.49	
Rejected and declined votes		320	1.51	+0.41
Turnout		21,198	76.71	-0.68
Electors on the lists		27,634		
Source: Official Results, Government of Quebec
Liberal hold		Swing		+4.17

1985 Quebec general election: Mégantic-Compton
Party	Candidate	Votes	%	±%
Liberal	Madeleine Bélanger	12,865	59.48	-8.12
Parti Québécois	Maurice Bernier	8,708	37.35	+6.87
New Democratic	Joseph Lemoine	594	2.75	–
Christian Socialist	Steeve Stratford	91	0.42	–
Total valid votes		21,628	98.90	
Rejected and declined votes		241	1.10	+0.15
Turnout		21,869	77.39	+4.96
Electors on the lists		28,257		
Source: Official Results, Government of Quebec
Liberal hold		Swing		-7.50

Quebec provincial by-election, December 5, 1983: Mégantic-Compton
Party	Candidate	Votes	%	±%
Liberal	Madeleine Bélanger	13,711	67.60	+15.87
Parti Québécois	Noël Landry	6,182	30.48	-11.04
Independent	Jean-Luc Perron	233	1.15	–
No Affiliation	Patricia Métivier	156	0.77	–
Total valid votes		20,282	99.05	
Total rejected ballots		194	0.95	+0.23
Turnout		20,476	72.43	-9.61
Electors on the lists		28,270		
Liberal hold		Swing		+13.50
By-election due to the death of Fabien Bélanger
Source(s) "December 5, 1983 By-election". Chief Electoral Officer of Quebec. December 5, 1983.
