= Jimmy Gagnon =

Quebec politician

Jimmy Gagnon MNA

Member of the National Assembly for Mégantic
- Incumbent
- Assumed office October 5, 2026
- Preceded by: François Jacques

Personal details
- Party: Quebec Conservative Party

Jimmy Gagnon is a Quebec politician who was the elected to the National Assembly of Quebec for Mégantic in the 2026 Quebec general election as a member of the Quebec Conservative Party.

== Electoral record ==
2026 Quebec general election: Mégantic
** Preliminary results — Not yet official **
Party	Candidate	Votes	%	±%
Conservative	Jimmy Gagnon	12,290	34.29	
Parti Québécois	Debbie Fennety	8,955	24.98	
Coalition Avenir Québec	François Jacques	7,184	20.04	
Liberal	Sylvain Houle	4,346	12.12	
Québec solidaire	Marilyn Ouellet	2,532	7.06	
Climat Québec	Marie-Michèle Boutet	302	0.84	
Démocratie directe	Claude Jr Tremblay	235	0.66	
Total valid votes				
Total rejected ballots				
Turnout			69.99	
Electors on the lists			–	–
Source: Élections Québec
