= Louis Houde =

Canadian politician

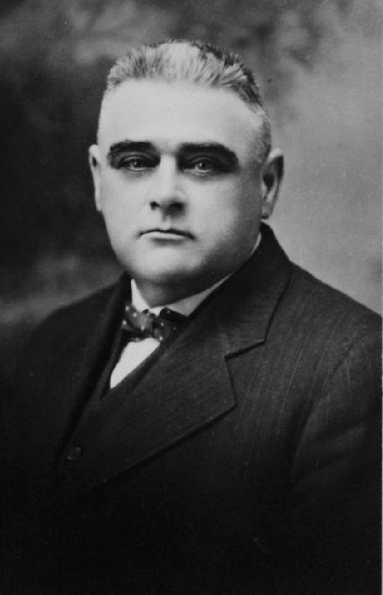

Member of the Legislative Assembly of Quebec for Mégantic
- In office 1939–1940
- Preceded by: Tancrède Labbé
- Succeeded by: Tancrède Labbé

Personal details
- Born: October 2, 1879 Deschaillons, Quebec
- Died: December 9, 1945 (aged 66) Quebec City, Quebec
- Party: Liberal

Louis Houde (October 2, 1879 – December 9, 1945) was a Canadian provincial politician.

Born in Deschaillons, Quebec, Houde was mayor of Plessisville from 1910 to 1913. He was the member of the Legislative Assembly of Quebec for Mégantic from 1939 to 1940.
