= Éloi Guillemette =

Canadian politician

Member of the Legislative Assembly of Quebec for Frontenac
- In office 1956–1966
- Preceded by: Gérard Noël
- Succeeded by: Fernand Grenier

Personal details
- Born: December 1, 1911 Saint-Célestin, Quebec
- Died: February 23, 1984 (aged 72) Sherbrooke, Quebec
- Party: Union Nationale

Éloi Guillemette (December 1, 1911 – February 23, 1984) was a Canadian politician and a three-term Member of the Legislative Assembly of Quebec.

== Background ==
He was born on December 1, 1911, near Saint-Célestin, Centre-du-Québec and became an agronomist.

== Member of the legislature ==
Guillemette ran as a Union Nationale and won a seat to the Legislative Assembly of Quebec in the 1956 election in the provincial district of Frontenac. He was re-elected in the 1960 and 1962 elections.

He did not run for re-election in the 1966 election.

== Death ==
He died on February 23, 1984, in Sherbrooke, Quebec.
