= Andrew Stuart Johnson =

Canadian politician

Andrew Stuart Johnson (December 14, 1848 – June 11, 1926) was a farmer, lumber merchant, mining company owner and political figure in Quebec. He represented Mégantic in the Legislative Assembly of Quebec from 1886 to 1888 and from 1890 to 1892 as a Conservative.

He was born in Clapham, Inverness Township, Canada East, the son of Samuel Johnson and Agnes Steel. Johnson was the owner of the Johnson Asbestos Company, a mining company, and helped establish the asbestos industry in the province. He married Maria McGommon. He was postmaster at Clapham and served on the municipal council at Thetford Mines. Johnson was mayor of Thetford Mines from 1885 to 1888. His election to the Quebec assembly in 1886 was annulled in 1888 and he lost the subsequent by-election to William Rhodes. Johnson was elected again in 1890. He died at Thetford Mines at the age of 77 and was buried in Elmwood Cemetery in Sherbrooke.

The Andrew S. Johnson Science Building at Bishop's University in Lennoxville, Quebec, was named after him. He was a trustee member of Bishop's executive committee from 1935 since 1966, as well as chairman of that committee from 1956 until 1963.

The Andrew Stuart Johnson Memorial High School in Thetford Mines is also named after him.

His son Andrew Stuart Johnson Jr. took over the operation of the asbestos company after his father's death.
