= François Jacques (politician) =

Canadian politician

Member of the National Assembly of Quebec for Mégantic
- In office October 1, 2018 – October 5, 2026
- Preceded by: Ghislain Bolduc
- Succeeded by: Jimmy Gagnon

Personal details
- Born: March 27, 1970 (age 56) Lac-Mégantic, Quebec, Canada
- Party: Coalition Avenir Québec
- Spouse: Dominik Leblanc (deceased)

François Jacques (born March 27, 1970) is a Canadian politician, who was elected to the National Assembly of Quebec in the 2018 provincial election. He represented the electoral district of Mégantic as a member of the Coalition Avenir Québec until 2026.

Jacques previously served as a municipal councillor in Lac-Mégantic.

== Electoral record ==
2026 Quebec general election: Mégantic
** Preliminary results — Not yet official **
Party	Candidate	Votes	%	±%
Conservative	Jimmy Gagnon	12,290	34.29	
Parti Québécois	Debbie Fennety	8,955	24.98	
Coalition Avenir Québec	François Jacques	7,184	20.04	
Liberal	Sylvain Houle	4,346	12.12	
Québec solidaire	Marilyn Ouellet	2,532	7.06	
Climat Québec	Marie-Michèle Boutet	302	0.84	
Démocratie directe	Claude Jr Tremblay	235	0.66	
Total valid votes				
Total rejected ballots				
Turnout			69.99	
Electors on the lists			–	–
Source: Élections Québec

2022 Quebec general election: Mégantic
Party	Candidate	Votes	%	±%
Coalition Avenir Québec	François Jacques	12,973	46.17	-1.36
Conservative	Mathieu Chenard	6,252	22.25	–
Québec solidaire	Marilyn Ouellet	3,592	12.78	-3.18
Parti Québécois	André Duncan	3,588	12.77	+0.22
Liberal	Eloïse Gagné	1,604	5.71	-15.13
Parti 51	André Giguère	89	0.32	–
Total valid votes		28,098	98.61	–
Total rejected ballots		397	1.39	–
Turnout		28,495	70.39	
Electors on the lists		40,481		

2018 Quebec general election: Mégantic
Party	Candidate	Votes	%	±%
Coalition Avenir Québec	François Jacques	12,593	47.53	+24.66
Liberal	Robert G. Roy	5,257	19.84	-20.95
Québec solidaire	Andrée Larrivée	4,228	15.96	+10.16
Parti Québécois	Gloriane Blais	3,325	12.55	-17.1
Green	Sylvain Dodier	809	3.05	
Citoyens au pouvoir	Richard Veilleux	281	1.06	
Total valid votes		26,493	98.60	
Total rejected ballots		377	1.40	
Turnout		26,870	69.15	
Eligible voters		38,856		
Coalition Avenir Québec gain from Liberal		Swing		+22.81
Source(s) "Rapport des résultats officiels du scrutin". Élections Québec.
