= Frontenac (Quebec provincial electoral district, 1912–1973) =

Former provincial electoral district in Quebec, Canada

Quebec electoral district

Defunct provincial electoral district
- Legislature: National Assembly of Quebec
- District created: 1912
- District abolished: 1972
- First contested: 1912
- Last contested: 1970

Frontenac (French pronunciation: [fʁɔ̃tnak]) was a provincial electoral district in the province of Quebec, Canada. It was located in the Estrie region, and is not to be confused with the other former Frontenac electoral district located in the Chaudière-Appalaches region, which re-used the name.

Sources differ on whether the pre-1973 and post-1973 Frontenac electoral districts should be considered different or one and the same. The 1966 version of Frontenac and the 1973 version of Frontenac were drastically different but actually had a small overlap of territory around the area of the modern municipality of Adstock.

It was created for the 1912 election from parts of the existing Beauce and Compton districts. It last existed in the 1970 election. Its successor electoral district was Mégantic-Compton.

It was named after a former governor of New France, Louis de Buade de Frontenac.

== Members of the Legislative / National Assembly ==
- Georges-Stanislas Gregoire, Liberal (1912–1923)
- Cyril Baillargeon, Liberal (1923–1931)
- Henri-Louis Gagnon, Liberal (1931–1935)
- Patrice Tardif, Action liberale nationale – Union Nationale (1935–1939)
- Henri-Louis Gagnon, Liberal (1939–1944)
- Patrice Tardif, Union Nationale (1944–1952)
- Gérard Noel, Liberal (1952–1956)
- Éloi Guillemette, Union Nationale (1956–1966)
- Fernand Grenier, Union Nationale (1966–1970)
- Paul-André Latulippe Ralliement creditiste (1970–1973)

== See also ==
- List of Quebec provincial electoral districts
- Canadian provincial electoral districts
