= Mégantic (provincial electoral district) =

Provincial electoral district in Quebec, Canada

Coordinates: 45°35′N 71°10′W

Quebec electoral district

Provincial electoral district
- Legislature: National Assembly of Quebec
MNA
Jimmy Gagnon
Conservative
- District created: 1867
- District abolished: 1972
- District re-created: 2011
- First contested: 1867, 2012
- Last contested: 1970, 2026

Demographics
- Population (2011): 49,055
- Electors (2014): 38,589
- Area (km²): 5,266.8
- Pop. density (per km²): 9.3
- Census division(s): Coaticook (all), Les Sources (all), Le Granit (part), Le Val-Saint-François (part), Les Appalaches (part)
- Census subdivision(s): Ascot Corner, Audet, Beaulac-Garthby, Bury, Chartierville, Cookshire-Eaton, Disraeli (parish), Disraeli (city), Dudswell, East Angus, Frontenac, Hampden, Lac-Drolet, Lac-Mégantic, Lambton, La Patrie, Lingwick, Marston, Milan, Nantes, Newport, Notre-Dame-des-Bois, Piopolis, Saint-Augustin-de-Woburn, Sainte-Cécile-de-Whitton, Saint-Isidore-de-Clifton, Sainte-Praxède, Saint-Romain, Saint-Sébastien, Scotstown, Stornoway, Stratford, Val-Racine, Weedon, Westbury, Danville, Val-des-Sources, Saint-Georges-de-Windsor, Wotton, Saint-Camille, Saint-Adrien and Ham-Sud.

Mégantic is a provincial electoral district in the Estrie and Chaudière-Appalaches regions of Quebec, Canada. It notably includes the municipalities of Lac-Mégantic, Cookshire-Eaton, East Angus, Ascot Corner, Stoke, Weedon, and Disraeli.

It was created for the 1867 election (and an electoral district of that name existed earlier in the Legislative Assembly of the Province of Canada and the Legislative Assembly of Lower Canada). It was abolished before the 1973 election and its territory was mostly divided between Lotbinière and Frontenac; a small part also went to Arthabaska. Despite the name, none of the territory of Mégantic went into the newly created Mégantic-Compton. However, Mégantic-Compton was abolished before the 2012 election and its successor electoral district was the recreated Mégantic, which contains most of the former area Mégantic-Compton, as well as parts of Johnson, Richmond, and Frontenac as they existed prior to the 2012 election.

In 2026, it lost Stoke, while gaining Danville, Val-des-Sources, Saint-Georges-de-Windsor, Wotton, Saint-Camille, Saint-Adrien and Ham-Sud.

== Members of the Legislative Assembly / National Assembly ==
Legislature	Years	Member	Party
1st	1867–1871	George Irvine	Conservative
2nd	1871–1874	George Irvine	Conservative
2nd	1874–1875	George Irvine	Independent
3rd	1875–1876	George Irvine	Liberal
3rd	1876–1878	Andrew Kennedy	Conservative
4th	1878–1881	George Irvine	Liberal
5th	1881–1884	George Irvine	Liberal
5th	1884–1886	John Whyte	Liberal
6th	1886–1888	Andrew Stuart Johnson	Conservative
6th	1888–1890	William Rhodes	Liberal
7th	1890–1892	Andrew Stuart Johnson	Conservative
8th	1892–1897	James King	Conservative
9th	1897–1900	George Robert Smith	Liberal
10th	1900–1904	George Robert Smith	Liberal
11th	1904–1908	George Robert Smith	Liberal
12th	1908–1912	David Henry Pennington	Conservative
13th	1912–1916	Joseph Demers	Liberal
14th	1916–1919	Lauréat Lapierre	Liberal
15th	1919–1923	Lauréat Lapierre	Liberal
16th	1923–1927	Lauréat Lapierre	Liberal
17th	1927–1931	Lauréat Lapierre	Liberal
18th	1931–1935	Lauréat Lapierre	Liberal
19th	1935–1936	Tancrède Labbé	Action liberale nationale
20th	1936–1939	Tancrède Labbé	Union Nationale
21st	1939–1940	Louis Houde	Liberal
21st	1940–1944	Tancrède Labbé	Union Nationale
22nd	1944–1948	Tancrède Labbé	Union Nationale
23rd	1948–1952	Tancrède Labbé	Union Nationale
24th	1952–1956	Tancrède Labbé	Union Nationale
25th	1956–1956†	Tancrède Labbé	Union Nationale
25th	1957–1960	Joseph-Émile Fortin	Union Nationale
26th	1960–1962	Émilien Maheux	Liberal
27th	1962–1966	Émilien Maheux	Liberal
28th	1966–1970	Marc Bergeron	Union Nationale
29th	1970–1973	Bernard Dumont	Ralliement créditiste
Riding dissolved into Lotbinière, Frontenac and Arthabaska
Riding re-created from Mégantic-Compton, Johnson, Richmond and Frontenac
40th	2012–2014	Ghislain Bolduc	Liberal
41st	2014–2018	Ghislain Bolduc	Liberal
42nd	2018–2022	François Jacques	Coalition Avenir Québec
43rd	2022–2026	François Jacques	Coalition Avenir Québec
44th	2026–Present	Jimmy Gagnon	Conservative

== Election results ==
=== 2012 – present ===
2026 Quebec general election
** Preliminary results — Not yet official **
Party	Candidate	Votes	%	±%
Conservative	Jimmy Gagnon	12,290	34.29	
Parti Québécois	Debbie Fennety	8,955	24.98	
Coalition Avenir Québec	François Jacques	7,184	20.04	
Liberal	Sylvain Houle	4,346	12.12	
Québec solidaire	Marilyn Ouellet	2,532	7.06	
Climat Québec	Marie-Michèle Boutet	302	0.84	
Démocratie directe	Claude Jr Tremblay	235	0.66	
Total valid votes				
Total rejected ballots				
Turnout			69.99	
Electors on the lists			–	–
Source: Élections Québec

2022 Quebec general election redistributed results
Party	Vote	%
Coalition Avenir Québec	15,848	46.52
Conservative	7,487	21.98
Québec solidaire	4,420	12.97
Parti Québécois	4,373	12.84
Liberal	1,826	5.36
Others	113	0.33

2022 Quebec general election
Party	Candidate	Votes	%	±%
Coalition Avenir Québec	François Jacques	12,973	46.17	-1.36
Conservative	Mathieu Chenard	6,252	22.25	–
Québec solidaire	Marilyn Ouellet	3,592	12.78	-3.18
Parti Québécois	André Duncan	3,588	12.77	+0.22
Liberal	Eloïse Gagné	1,604	5.71	-15.13
Parti 51	André Giguère	89	0.32	–
Total valid votes		28,098	98.61	–
Total rejected ballots		397	1.39	–
Turnout		28,495	70.39	
Electors on the lists		40,481		

2018 Quebec general election
Party	Candidate	Votes	%	±%
Coalition Avenir Québec	François Jacques	12,593	47.53	+24.66
Liberal	Robert G. Roy	5,257	19.84	-20.95
Québec solidaire	Andrée Larrivée	4,228	15.96	+10.16
Parti Québécois	Gloriane Blais	3,325	12.55	-17.1
Green	Sylvain Dodier	809	3.05	
Citoyens au pouvoir	Richard Veilleux	281	1.06	
Total valid votes		26,493	98.60	
Total rejected ballots		377	1.40	
Turnout		26,870	69.15	
Eligible voters		38,856		
Coalition Avenir Québec gain from Liberal		Swing		+22.81
Source(s) "Rapport des résultats officiels du scrutin". Élections Québec.

2014 Quebec general election
Party	Candidate	Votes	%	±%
Liberal	Ghislain Bolduc	10,840	40.79	+5.70
Parti Québécois	Isabelle Hallé	7,879	29.65	-1.57
Coalition Avenir Québec	Pierre-Luc Boulanger	6,078	22.87	-2.75
Québec solidaire	Ludovick Nadeau	1,541	5.80	+0.40
Option nationale	Évelyne Beaudin	236	0.89	-0.78
Total valid votes		26,574	98.59	–
Total rejected ballots		381	1.41	–
Turnout		26,955	69.85	-4.59
Electors on the lists		38,589	–	–
Liberal hold		Swing		+3.64

2012 Quebec general election
Party	Candidate	Votes	%	±%
Liberal	Ghislain Bolduc	9,946	35.09	-9.32
Parti Québécois	Gloriane Blais	8,847	31.22	-4.35
Coalition Avenir Québec	Raymonde Lapointe	7,260	25.62	+9.49
Québec solidaire	William Leclerc Bellavance	1,531	5.40	+1.74
Option nationale	Jasmin Roy-Rouleau	473	1.67	–
Independent	Jacques Audet	178	0.63	–
Independent	Jean-Luc Perron	106	0.37	–
Total valid votes		28,341	98.76	–
Total rejected ballots		355	1.24	–
Turnout		28,696	74.44	
Electors on the lists		38,548	–	–
Liberal hold		Swing		-2.49

^ Change is from redistributed results. CAQ change is from ADQ.

=== 1867 – 1970 ===
1970 Quebec general election
Party	Candidate	Votes	%	±%
Ralliement créditiste	Bernard Dumont	8,201	28.79	–
Union Nationale	Marc Bergeron	7,700	27.04	-19.34
Liberal	Paul-E. Giguère	6,954	24.42	-19.67
Parti Québécois	Guy Lebel	5,626	19.75	+10.22*
Total valid votes		28,481	96.02	–
Total rejected ballots		1,181	3.98	–
Turnout		29,662	88.09	+4.01
Electors on the lists		33,674	–	–

* Result compared to Ralliement national

1966 Quebec general election
Party	Candidate	Votes	%
Union Nationale	Marc Bergeron	11,894	46.38
Liberal	Pierre-Émilien Maheux	11,306	44.09
Ralliement national	Harold Vachon	2,443	9.53
Total valid votes		25,643	98.59
Total rejected ballots		367	1.41
Turnout		26,010	84.08
Electors on the lists		30,936	–

1962 Quebec general election
Party	Candidate	Votes	%
Liberal	Pierre-Émilien Maheux	13,182	55.05
Union Nationale	Joseph-Henri Paquet	10,762	44.95
Total valid votes		23,944	99.28
Total rejected ballots		173	0.72
Turnout		24,117	88.95
Electors on the lists		27,114	–

1960 Quebec general election
Party	Candidate	Votes	%
Liberal	Pierre-Émilien Maheux	14,221	59.22
Union Nationale	Joseph-Émile Fortin	9,794	40.78
Total valid votes		24,015	98.56
Total rejected ballots		351	1.44
Turnout		24,366	88.95
Electors on the lists		26,520	–

Quebec provincial by-election, 1957
Party	Candidate	Votes	%
Union Nationale	Joseph-Émile Fortin	13,799	64.77
Liberal	Pierre-Émilien Maheux	7,504	35.23
Total valid votes		21,303	99.11
Total rejected ballots		191	0.89
Turnout		21,494	84.10
Electors on the lists		25,559	–

== See also ==
- List of Quebec provincial electoral districts
- Canadian provincial electoral districts
