= William Rhodes (Canadian politician) =

Canadian politician (1821–1892)

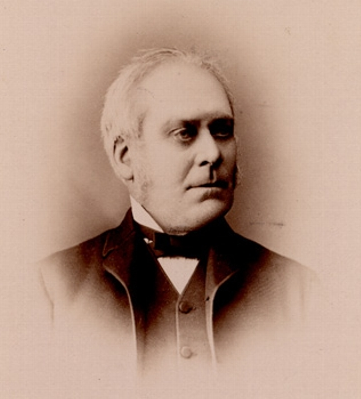

Member of the Legislative Assembly of Quebec for Mégantic
- In office 1888–1890
- Preceded by: Andrew Stuart Johnson
- Succeeded by: Andrew Stuart Johnson

Member of the Legislative Assembly of the Province of Canada
- In office 1854–1858

Personal details
- Born: November 29, 1821 Bramhope Hall, Yorkshire, England
- Died: February 16, 1892 (aged 70) Sillery, Quebec, Canada
- Resting place: Mount Hermon Cemetery, Sillery, Quebec, Canada

William Rhodes (29 November 1821 – 16 February 1892) was a soldier, farmer and political figure in Quebec. He represented Mégantic in the Legislative Assembly of the Province of Canada from 1854 to 1858 as a Reformer and in the Legislative Assembly of Quebec from 1888 to 1890 as a Liberal.

He was born at Bramhope Hall Estate in Yorkshire, England, the son of William Rhodes and Ann Smith. Rhodes entered the British Army in 1838, and served in Canada East, from 1842 to 1844.

In 1847, he retired from the army as a captain and settled in Sillery, Canada East. During the same year, he married Anne Catherine Dunn, granddaughter of Thomas Dunn and Mathew Bell, at the Cathedral of the Holy Trinity in Quebec City, on 16 June. The following year, Rhodes purchased Sillery's Benmore Estate (French: domaine Benmore), which has been designated a component of the Sillery Heritage Site since 1964.

Rhodes was one of the founders of the Union Bank of Lower Canada. He was president of the Quebec Bridge Company, the North Shore Railway, the Quebec and Trois-Pistoles Railway, and the Quebec and Richmond Railway. Rhodes was also president of the Quebec Geographical Society, a justice of the peace, and a lieutenant in the militia.

In January 1889, L'Électeur published a detailed profile of Rhodes, describing him as a loyal subject of the Crown, a former British Army officer, and a respected figure in Quebec politics. By then serving as Minister of Agriculture in Honoré Mercier’s cabinet, he was praised as both a knowledgeable and practical farmer who invested in agricultural research and shared his expertise with French-Canadian audiences in their own language. The newspaper portrayed him as a tall, vigorous man in his late sixties, admired for his integrity, moderation, and ability to bridge English and French communities.

Rhodes was defeated when he ran for reelection in 1890. William Rhodes died at his residence of the Benmore Estate in Sillery, at the age of 70.
