= List of Quebec 1000 meter peaks =

This list of Quebec's 1000-meter peaks is a list of the summits in Quebec higher than 1,000 meters (3,300 ft), used in the mountaineering sport of peak bagging. Ranked peaks have 100 m (328 ft) of clean prominence.

Rank	Peak	Elev.		Prom.		Range (Level 4)	Isol.	
Rank	Peak	m	ft	m	ft	Range (Level 4)	km	mi
1.	Mont D'Iberville/Mount Caubvick	1,652	5,420	0	0	Torngat Mountains	.0	0
2.	Minaret Ridge	1,554	5,098	60	200	Torngat Mountains	1.0	0.62
3.	Peak 4824	1,470	4,820	738	2,421	Torngat Mountains	8.1	5.0
4.	Peak 4800 Map 14L13	1,463	4,800	427	1,401	Torngat Mountains	3.4	2.1
5.	Peak 4700 Map 24I16 No 1	1,433	4,701	580	1,900	Torngat Mountains	8.6	5.3
6.	Peak 4534	1,382	4,534	407	1,335	Torngat Mountains	4.2	2.6
7.	West Korok Mountain	1,311	4,301	488	1,601	Torngat Mountains	5.8	3.6
8.	Mont Jacques-Cartier	1,268	4,160	1,085	3,560	Notre Dame Mountains	405.7	252.1
9.	Mont Jacques-Rousseau	1,261	4,137	712	2,336	Torngat Mountains	15.7	9.8
10.	Peak 4100 Map 14L12	1,250	4,100	518	1,699	Torngat Mountains	6.9	4.3
11.	Mont Dos de Baleine	1,245	4,085	1	3.3	Notre Dame Mountains	1.3	0.81
12.	Mont de la Passe	1,240	4,070	110	360	Notre Dame Mountains	1.6	0.99
13.	Mont Comte	1,232	4,042	72	236	Notre Dame Mountains	1.6	0.99
14.	Peak 3992	1,217	3,993	364	1,194	Torngat Mountains	3.2	2.0
15.	Mont Les Cônes	1,207	3,960	209	686	Notre Dame Mountains	3.6	2.2
16.	Korok Mountain	1,204	3,950	290	950	Torngat Mountains	4.5	2.8
17.	Mont Rolland-Germain	1,202	3,944	76	249	Notre Dame Mountains	1.4	0.87
18.	Mont Gosford	1,193	3,914	120	390	Longfellow Mountains	2.3	1.4
19.	Peak 3900 Map 24P9	1,189	3,901	457	1,499	Torngat Mountains	4.5	2.8
20.	West Monument 443 Peak	1,187	3,894	480	1,570	Longfellow Mountains	10.3	6.4
21.	Mont Richardson	1,180	3,870	200	660	Notre Dame Mountains	5.5	3.4
22.	Mont de la Table	1,180	3,870	130	430	Notre Dame Mountains	2.9	1.8
23.	Mont de la Table-Sommet Nord	1,180	3,870	70	230	Notre Dame Mountains	3.2	2.0
24.	Mont Raoul-Blanchard	1,175	3,855	785	2,575	Laurentian Mountains	206.4	128.3
25.	Border Monuments 445-446 Peak	1,175	3,855	151	495	Longfellow Mountains	2.9	1.8
26.	Mont Allioux	1,159	3,802	309	1,014	Laurentian Mountains	18.0	11.2
27.	Peak 3800 Map 24P8	1,158	3,799	305	1,001	Torngat Mountains	4.2	2.6
28.	East Qarqaaluk Mountain	1,158	3,799	244	801	Torngat Mountains	3.4	2.1
29.	Mont Belle Fontaine	1,152	3,780	302	991	Laurentian Mountains	12.1	7.5
30.	Mont Albert	1,151	3,776	740	2,430	Notre Dame Mountains	14.0	8.7
31.	Mont Logan	1,150	3,770	620	2,030	Notre Dame Mountains	31.9	19.8
32.	Mont de la Table-Sommet Sud	1,150	3,770	40	130	Notre Dame Mountains	.8	0.50
33.	Petit Mont Sainte-Anne	1,147	3,763	87	285	Notre Dame Mountains	2.1	1.3
34.	Mont Xalibu	1,140	3,740	109	358	Notre Dame Mountains	1.6	0.99
35.	South Les Cônes	1,131	3,711	31	102	Notre Dame Mountains	1.8	1.1
36.	Mont MacLeod	1,130	3,710	120	390	Laurentian Mountains	3.0	1.9
37.	Peak 3700 Map 24P8	1,128	3,701	92	302	Torngat Mountains	1.8	1.1
38.	Mont Yapeitso	1,128	3,701			Northern Quebec	467.1	290.2
39.	Mont de la Québécoise	1,112	3,648	212	696	Laurentian Mountains	6.1	3.8
40.	Montagne du Malin	1,110	3,640	262	860	Laurentian Mountains	5.4	3.4
41.	Mont Auclair	1,105	3,625	55	180	Notre Dame Mountains	2.5	1.6
42.	Mont Veyrier	1,104	3,622			Northern Quebec	185.2	115.1
43.	Mont Mégantic	1,102	3,615	572	1,877	Longfellow Mountains	28.1	17.5
44.	Petit Mont Gosford	1,100	3,600	41	135	Longfellow Mountains	.9	0.56
45.	Peak 3600	1,097	3,599	365	1,198	Northern Quebec	26.4	16.4
46.	Peak 3600 Map 24P9	1,097	3,599	213	699	Torngat Mountains	3.7	2.3
47.	Caribou Mountain-West Peak	1,092	3,583	37	121	Longfellow Mountains	1.1	0.68
48.	Montagne du Pavillon	1,090	3,580	186	610	Laurentian Mountains	3.4	2.1
49.	Montagne Brûlé	1,090	3,580	124	407	Laurentian Mountains	2.4	1.5
50.	Mont du lac Boily	1,090	3,580	110	360	Laurentian Mountains	2.7	1.7
51.	Mont Provencher	1,087	3,566	157	515	Northern Quebec	6.1	3.8
52.	Mont Fernald	1,087	3,566	77	253	Notre Dame Mountains	2.2	1.4
53.	Mont Joseph-Fortin	1,086	3,563	62	203	Notre Dame Mountains	1.4	0.87
54.	Mont du Lac Ben	1,084	3,556			Laurentian Mountains	21.9	13.6
55.	Mont Albert-Sommet Nord	1,083	3,553	73	240	Notre Dame Mountains	4.6	2.9
56.	Mont Lucie	1,082	3,550	350	1,150	Northern Quebec	15.6	9.7
57.	Mont de la Tour Boissinot	1,082	3,550	168	551	Northern Quebec	9.1	5.7
58.	Peak 3550 A	1,082	3,550	137	449	Northern Quebec	11.6	7.2
59.	Peak 3550 B	1,082	3,550	30	98	Northern Quebec	12.0	7.5
60.	Mont du Lycopode	1,082	3,550			Northern Quebec	16.9	10.5
61.	Brown Benchmark North	1,079	3,540	171	561	Longfellow Mountains	3.0	1.9
62.	Monument 450 Peak	1,079	3,540	76	249	Longfellow Mountains	1.5	0.93
63.	Mont de la Galette	1,078	3,537	158	518	Laurentian Mountains	36.0	22.4
64.	Mont Dodge	1,078	3,537	38	125	Notre Dame Mountains	1.6	0.99
65.	Mont Provencher Nord	1,077	3,533	10	33	Northern Quebec	.5	0.31
66.	Mont des Loupes	1,076	3,530	196	643	Notre Dame Mountains	4.5	2.8
67.	Mont Matawees	1,073	3,520	193	633	Notre Dame Mountains	2.9	1.8
68.	Mont Camille-Pouliot - Sommet Ouest	1,071	3,514	216	709	Laurentian Mountains	4.9	3.0
69.	Mont Saint-Joseph	1,071	3,514	171	561	Longfellow Mountains	2.6	1.6
70.	Mont Qarqaaluk	1,069	3,507	277	909	Torngat Mountains	7.5	4.7
71.	Mont Sainte-Anne	1,068	3,504	18	59	Notre Dame Mountains	2.1	1.3
72.	Mont Camille-Pouliot - Sommet 1067	1,067	3,501	27	89	Laurentian Mountains	.3	0.19
73.	Peak 3500 A	1,067	3,501	259	850	Northern Quebec	9.1	5.7
74.	Peak 3500 Map 24P9	1,067	3,501	183	600	Torngat Mountains	2.4	1.5
75.	Peak 3500 B	1,067	3,501	168	551	Northern Quebec	2.5	1.6
76.	Peak 3500 E	1,067	3,501	137	449	Northern Quebec	10.3	6.4
77.	Peak 3500 F	1,067	3,501	137	449	Northern Quebec	3.1	1.9
78.	Peak 3500 D	1,067	3,501	46	151	Northern Quebec	3.5	2.2
79.	Peak 3500 C	1,067	3,501	15	49	Northern Quebec	3.2	2.0
80.	Mont Goéland	1,066	3,497	136	446	Northern Quebec	3.6	2.2
81.	Mont Blanc	1,065	3,494	731	2,398	Notre Dame Mountains	19.0	11.8
82.	Mont Jean-Hubert	1,065	3,494	153	502	Laurentian Mountains	4.3	2.7
83.	Mont Jauffret	1,065	3,494	105	344	Northern Quebec	3.0	1.9
84.	Mont Victoria	1,064	3,491	44	144	Longfellow Mountains	1.7	1.1
85.	Mont Marjolaine	1,063	3,488	133	436	Northern Quebec	5.2	3.2
86.	Mont du lac à l'Alouette	1,060	3,480	110	360	Laurentian Mountains	3.9	2.4
87.	Mont Pembroke	1,060	3,480	70	230	Notre Dame Mountains	1.8	1.1
88.	Petit mont de la Galette	1,055	3,461	15	49	Laurentian Mountains	.3	0.19
89.	Mont Bleu	1,052	3,451	192	630	Laurentian Mountains	2.9	1.8
90.	Peak 3450 A	1,052	3,451	549	1,801	Northern Quebec	29.7	18.5
91.	Peak 3450 B	1,052	3,451	153	502	Northern Quebec	31.7	19.7
92.	Peak 3450 C	1,052	3,451	107	351	Northern Quebec	2.3	1.4
93.	Mont Louis-Marie-Lalonde	1,051	3,448	59	194	Notre Dame Mountains	1.8	1.1
94.	Mont Jérémie	1,050	3,440			Laurentian Mountains	27.0	16.8
95.	Montagne des Érables	1,048	3,438	408	1,339	Laurentian Mountains	5.5	3.4
96.	Mont Jacques Ferron	1,043	3,422	253	830	Notre Dame Mountains	3.1	1.9
97.	Mont de la Rivière Noire	1,043	3,422	193	633	Laurentian Mountains	2.8	1.7
98.	Mont Griscom	1,040	3,410	50	160	Notre Dame Mountains	.8	0.50
99.	Montagne des Érables-Pic Central	1,040	3,410	50	160	Laurentian Mountains	1.0	0.62
100.	Mont du Lac du Verrou	1,040	3,410			Laurentian Mountains	3.5	2.2
101.	Mont du Lac Ovide	1,040	3,410			Laurentian Mountains	6.6	4.1
102.	Mont Stefansson	1,039	3,409	292	958	Northern Quebec	21.3	13.2
103.	Mont du lac des Marais	1,039	3,409	249	817	Laurentian Mountains	6.0	3.7
104.	Mont de la Péribonka (OT4)	1,039	3,409			Northern Quebec	30.3	18.8
105.	Mont Elie	1,038	3,406	288	945	Laurentian Mountains	2.3	1.4
106.	Peak 3400 Map 24P9	1,036	3,399	335	1,099	Torngat Mountains	2.3	1.4
107.	Salmon Mountain	1,036	3,399	268	879	Longfellow Mountains	7.2	4.5
108.	Peak 3400 A	1,036	3,399	198	650	Northern Quebec	6.3	3.9
109.	Peak 3400 B	1,036	3,399	183	600	Northern Quebec	14.4	8.9
110.	Peak 3400 C	1,036	3,399	152	499	Northern Quebec	5.8	3.6
111.	Peak 3400 D	1,036	3,399	152	499	Northern Quebec	9.1	5.7
112.	Peak 3400 E	1,036	3,399	137	449	Northern Quebec	4.9	3.0
113.	Peak 3400 H	1,036	3,399	122	400	Northern Quebec	9.1	5.7
114.	Mont de la Chicoutai	1,036	3,399	122	400	Northern Quebec	2.6	1.6
115.	Peak 3400 G	1,036	3,399	91	299	Northern Quebec	8.7	5.4
116.	Peak 3400 F	1,036	3,399	76	249	Northern Quebec	5.8	3.6
117.	Mont McWhirter	1,036	3,399	46	151	Notre Dame Mountains	2.5	1.6
118.	Peak 3400 I	1,036	3,399	45	148	Northern Quebec	9.8	6.1
119.	Mont de la Chicoutai Nord-Est	1,036	3,399	45	148	Northern Quebec	3.1	1.9
120.	Mont Collins	1,036	3,399	46	151	Notre Dame Mountains	1.2	0.75
121.	Montagne des Érables-Pic Sud	1,030	3,380	40	130	Laurentian Mountains	.4	0.25
122.	Mont des Conscrits	1,030	3,380			Laurentian Mountains	34.0	21.1
123.	Mont du lac Magneron (OT5)	1,030	3,380			Northern Quebec	9.6	6.0
124.	Montagne de Cristal	1,029	3,376	309	1,014	Notre Dame Mountains	2.7	1.7
125.	Mont du lac Shikapio (OT6)	1,028	3,373			Northern Quebec	13.9	8.6
126.	Pic du Vieillard	1,026	3,366	46	151	Notre Dame Mountains	3.0	1.9
127.	Mont du Lac Sérénité	1,023	3,356	136	446	Laurentian Mountains	4.4	2.7
128.	Mont du Lac des Roches	1,022	3,353	112	367	Laurentian Mountains	1.8	1.1
129.	Peak 3350 A	1,021	3,350	168	551	Northern Quebec	2.5	1.6
130.	Peak 3350 D	1,021	3,350	122	400	Northern Quebec	2.4	1.5
131.	Peak 3350 E	1,021	3,350	122	400	Northern Quebec	10.2	6.3
132.	Peak 3350 F	1,021	3,350	107	351	Northern Quebec	3.1	1.9
133.	Peak 3350 G	1,021	3,350	107	351	Northern Quebec	2.2	1.4
134.	Peak 3350 H	1,021	3,350	107	351	Northern Quebec	3.5	2.2
135.	Peak 3350 I	1,021	3,350	107	351	Northern Quebec	3.7	2.3
136.	Peak 3350 J	1,021	3,350	107	351	Northern Quebec	2.7	1.7
137.	Peak 3350 K	1,021	3,350	107	351	Northern Quebec	4.9	3.0
138.	Peak 3350 B	1,021	3,350	30	98	Northern Quebec	3.0	1.9
139.	Peak 3350 C	1,021	3,350	15	49	Northern Quebec	2.2	1.4
140.	Minganie High Point	1,021	3,350			Central and South Labrador	210.9	131.0
141.	Mont Fortin	1,020	3,350	110	360	Notre Dame Mountains	1.1	0.68
142.	Petit Mont Auclair	1,020	3,350	100	330	Notre Dame Mountains	1.3	0.81
143.	Border Monument 441 Peak	1,018	3,340	12	39	Longfellow Mountains	1.9	1.2
144.	Mont des Conscrits-Sommet Sud	1,016	3,333	6	20	Laurentian Mountains	.6	0.37
145.	Mont des Cris Perdus	1,016	3,333			Northern Quebec	17.2	10.7
146.	Mont du Lac Chapais	1,013	3,323	203	666	Laurentian Mountains	5.9	3.7
147.	Mont du Lac Ruban	1,010	3,310	211	692	Laurentian Mountains	3.0	1.9
148.	Mont Paul	1,010	3,310	170	560	Notre Dame Mountains	9.0	5.6
149.	Mont René-Richard - Sommet Nord	1,006	3,301	196	643	Laurentian Mountains	2.5	1.6
150.	Peak 3300 Map 24P9	1,006	3,301	214	702	Torngat Mountains	1.4	0.87
151.	Mont du Chicouté	1,006	3,301	214	702	Northern Quebec	8.2	5.1
152.	Mont Coulée de l’Orignal	1,006	3,301	183	600	Northern Quebec	4.3	2.7
153.	Peak 3300 A	1,006	3,301	137	449	Northern Quebec	7.9	4.9
154.	Peak 3300 B	1,006	3,301	122	400	Northern Quebec	2.7	1.7
155.	Mont du Petit Lac à l'Épaule	1,000	3,300	160	520	Laurentian Mountains	4.7	2.9

== See also ==
- Northeast 111 4000-footers
  - New England Four-thousand footers
  - Adirondack Forty-sixers
- New England Fifty Finest
