= Fernand Grenier (Canadian politician) =

Canadian politician (1927–1988)

Member of the Legislative Assembly of Quebec for Frontenac
- In office 1966–1970
- Preceded by: Éloi Guillemette
- Succeeded by: Paul-André Latulippe
- In office 1976–1980
- Preceded by: Joseph-Omer Dionne
- Succeeded by: Fabien Bélanger

Personal details
- Born: June 28, 1927 Nantes, near Lac-Mégantic, Quebec
- Died: January 19, 1988 (aged 60) Lac-Mégantic, Quebec
- Party: Union Nationale

Fernand Grenier (June 28, 1927 – January 19, 1988) was a Canadian politician from Quebec.

== Background ==
He was born on June 28, 1927, near Lac-Mégantic, Quebec, and made a career in education.

== Member of the legislature ==
Grenier ran as a Union Nationale and won a seat to the Legislative Assembly of Quebec in the 1966 provincial election in the district of Frontenac. He was defeated by Ralliement créditiste candidate Paul-André Latulippe in the 1970 election.

== Mayor ==
He was Mayor of Nantes, Quebec from 1969 to 1971.

== Political comeback ==
Grenier remained active in the Union Nationale. He ran as the party candidate in Lotbinière in the 1973 election but was defeated.

He was re-elected in the 1976 election in the district of Mégantic-Compton and won. He served as his party's House Whip from 1976 to 1980.

== Federal politics ==
Grenier resigned his seat and ran as a Progressive Conservative candidate in the district of Mégantic-Compton-Stanstead in the 1980 federal election. He was defeated against Liberal incumbent Claude Tessier. After the defeat, Grenier attempted to win back his seat to the National Assembly of Quebec, but finished third.

== Local politics ==
He served as a city councillor in Lac-Mégantic from 1986 until his death.
