= Tancrède Labbé =

Canadian politician and businessman (1887-1956)

Member of the Legislative Assembly of Quebec for Mégantic
- In office 1935–1939
- Preceded by: Lauréat Lapierre
- Succeeded by: Louis Houde
- In office 1940–1956
- Preceded by: Louis Houde
- Succeeded by: Joseph-Émile Fortin

Personal details
- Born: June 18, 1887 East Broughton, Quebec
- Died: December 13, 1956 (aged 69) Saint-Romuald, Quebec
- Party: Action libérale nationale Union Nationale

Joseph-Tancrède Labbé (June 18, 1887 – December 13, 1956) was a prominent Quebec politician and businessman. He was the father of media mogul François Labbé.

== Background ==
He was born on June 18, 1887, in East Broughton to parents who operated a farm and studied at the Frères des écoles chrétiennes, and studied commerce in Sainte-Marie.

He first worked as a general store clerk, and after that as a manager from 1913 to 1919 and after that, became a grocer when he founded T. Labbé Ltd. He also started an ice cream plant, Produits Régal LTD, in 1921, which remained in business until the 1980s, but with different owners. He was a member of the provincial ice cream producers association and became a director for Thetford Asbestos, a mining company.

Labbé was honorary member of the Thetford Mines Chamber of Commerce from 1931 to 1937 and from 1947 to 1951. Member of the Canadian Club, Rotary Club and the Knights of Columbus.

== Mayor ==
He was elected mayor of Thetford Mines on February 3, 1931, and kept his seat until February 9, 1937. He was elected mayor again in May 1946 and stayed there until May 1951.

== Member of the legislature ==
He was elected to the Legislative Assembly of Quebec in Mégantic in 1935 for the Action libérale nationale. Labbé joined Maurice Duplessis's Union Nationale and was re-elected in 1936.

He was defeated in 1939, but managed to win a by-election on November 19, 1940, and was re-elected in 1944, 1948, 1952 and 1956. He became a Minister without Portfolio in Duplessis's Cabinet in 1944.

With 11 years in office, he was the longest-tenured mayor of Thetford Mines until Henri Therrien retired after 12 years in office in 1999. He was the only politician to have been mayor of Thetford Mines and provincial MLA at the same time, from 1935 to 1937 and from 1946 to 1951, a practice that is now forbidden in Quebec. Laurent Lessard became a provincial MNA for the Liberal Party of Quebec after resigning as mayor of Thetford Mines in 2003.

Labbé was the first MLA from the Mégantic (now Frontenac) county to become a minister and the only Union Nationale MLA from the county to do so. After him, Roger Lefebvre and Laurent Lessard, both Liberals, also became ministers.

== Death ==
Labbé died in office in Saint-Romuald, Quebec on December 13, 1956.
