= Henri-Louis Gagnon =

Canadian politician

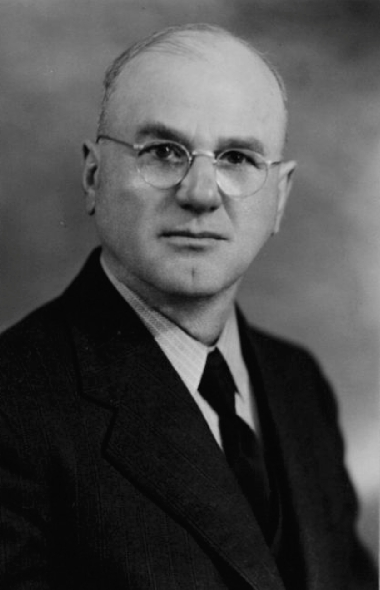

Member of the Legislative Assembly of Quebec for Frontenac
- In office 1931–1935
- Preceded by: Cyril Baillargeon
- Succeeded by: Patrice Tardif
- In office 1939–1944
- Preceded by: Patrice Tardif
- Succeeded by: Patrice Tardif

Personal details
- Born: September 13, 1881 Lambton, Quebec
- Died: June 16, 1964 (aged 82) Lambton, Quebec
- Party: Liberal

Henri-Louis Gagnon (September 13, 1881 – June 16, 1964) was a Canadian politician.

Born in Lambton, Quebec, the son of Louis Gagnon and Sobronie Bélanger, Gagnon was elected to the Legislative Assembly of Quebec for Frontenac in 1931. A Liberal, he was defeated in 1935. He was mayor of Lambton in 1935 and 1936. He was re-elected in 1939 and defeated in 1944.

He died in Lambton in 1964.
