= Joseph Demers (Quebec MLA) =

Canadian politician

Member of the Legislative Assembly of Quebec for Mégantic
- In office 1912–1916
- Preceded by: David Henry Pennington
- Succeeded by: Laureat Lapierre

Personal details
- Born: November 11, 1861 Sainte-Julie (Laurierville), Canada East
- Died: August 16, 1936 (aged 74) Thetford Mines, Quebec
- Party: Liberal

Joseph Demers (November 11, 1861 – August 16, 1936) was a Canadian politician in the province of Quebec.

Born in Sainte-Julie (Laurierville), Canada East, the son of Édouard Demers and Olympe Rousseau, Demers was educated in Sainte-Julie. He started clerking in 1877 until 1883 when he opened a general store in Thetford Mines. He was a councillor from 1890 till 1893, mayor from 1893 to 1895, and alderman from 1903 to 1905. He was first elected to the Legislative Assembly of Quebec for the electoral district of Mégantic in the 1912 election. A Liberal, he did not run in the 1916 election.
