= Ghislain Bolduc =

Canadian politician

Member of the National Assembly of Quebec for Mégantic
- In office September 4, 2012 – August 29, 2018
- Preceded by: first member
- Succeeded by: François Jacques

Personal details
- Born: July 18, 1952 (age 74) Sherbrooke, Quebec
- Party: Liberal
- Education: Université de Sherbrooke
- Profession: manager

Ghislain Bolduc (born July 18, 1952) is a Canadian politician. He was a member of the National Assembly of Quebec for the riding of Mégantic, first elected in the 2012 election and serving until his retirement in 2018.

Prior to his election to the legislature, Bolduc served as mayor of Lambton from 2009 to 2012 and as councillor from 2005 to 2009. Before elected office he worked as a chemical engineer and manager at AkzoNobel Polymer Chemicals.

Bolduc is a graduate of business management and chemical engineering at Université de Sherbrooke.
