= Mount Gosford =

Mountain in Quebec, Canada

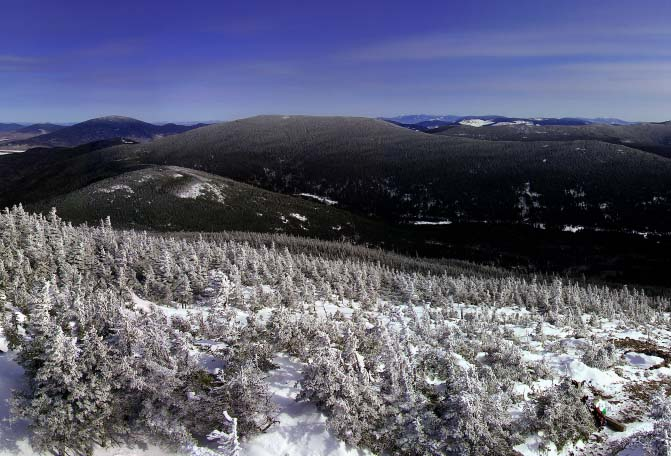
- View from the summit.

Highest point
- Elevation: 1,193 m (3,914 ft)
- Prominence: 541 m (1,775 ft)
- Listing: Quebec 1000 meter peaks
- Coordinates: 45°18′06″N 70°52′04″W

Geography
- Location within Quebec
- Location: Saint-Augustin-de-Woburn, Quebec
- Parent range: Longfellow Mountains

Geology
- Rock age: Precambrian
- Mountain type(s): Gneiss, Granulite

Climbing
- Easiest route: hiking

Mount Gosford is a mountain located in southern Quebec, Canada, at the border with Maine. It lies entirely in Saint-Augustin-de-Woburn in Estrie and is part of the White Mountains of the Appalachians. It is named after Archibald Acheson, 2nd Earl of Gosford, governor general of British North America from 1835 to 1837. It is the 21st highest peak in Quebec and 4th in Southern Quebec.

It is made of gneiss and granulite dating from the Precambrian era.

== Environmental protection ==
Since 1978, Mount Gosford is included in "ZEC Louise-Gosford", a controlled harvesting zone open to the public. Recently, the areas at more than 700 metres of altitude were designated Important Bird Areas due to the presence Bicknell's thrushes, an endemic species living in mountain peaks of northeast North America.

In 2009, Quebec's Ministry of Natural Resources and Wildlife set aside part of the Mount Gosford to create an ecological reserve. The same year, about 76 hectares of the mountain was renamed forêt rare du Mont-Gosford (Mount Gosford's Rare Forest) and declared an exceptional forest ecosystem. The designation protects mountain woodsorrels, considered rare at this altitude.

== See also ==
- Quebec 1000 meter peaks
