= Patrice Tardif (politician) =

Canadian politician (1904-1989)

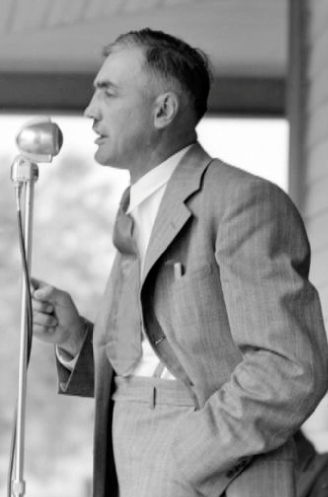
- Tardif in 1947

Member of the Legislative Assembly of Quebec for Frontenac
- In office 1935–1939
- Preceded by: Henri-Louis Gagnon
- Succeeded by: Henri-Louis Gagnon
- In office 1952–1956
- Preceded by: Henri-Louis Gagnon
- Succeeded by: Gérard Noel

Member of the Legislative Council of Quebec for De la Vallière
- In office 1952–1968
- Preceded by: Ernest Ouellet
- Succeeded by: Institution abolished in 1968

Personal details
- Born: June 17, 1904 Saint-Méthode-de-Frontenac, Quebec
- Died: May 1, 1989 (aged 84) Quebec City, Quebec
- Party: Union Nationale

Patrice Tardif (June 17, 1904 – May 1, 1989) was a politician in Quebec. He was a Member of the Legislative Assembly of Quebec (MLA).

== Early life ==
Tardif was born on June 17, 1904, in Saint-Méthode-de-Frontenac, Quebec and became a farmer.

== Career ==
Tardif ran as an Action libérale nationale candidate in the district of Frontenac in the 1935 provincial election and won. Tardif joined Maurice Duplessis's Union Nationale and was re-elected in 1936, but was defeated by Liberal candidate Henri-Louis Gagnon in 1939.

He served as Mayor of Saint-Méthode from 1939 to 1947.

Tardif was re-elected in 1944 and became Minister without Portfolio. He was re-elected in 1948, but was defeated in 1952.

He was appointed to the Legislative Council of Quebec in 1952 and represented the division of De la Vallière until the institution was abolished in 1968.

== Personal life and death ==
Tardif married Florida Jolicoeur in 1925.

He died on May 1, 1989, in Quebec.
