= Saint-Sébastien, Estrie =

Saint-Sébastien
- Municipality
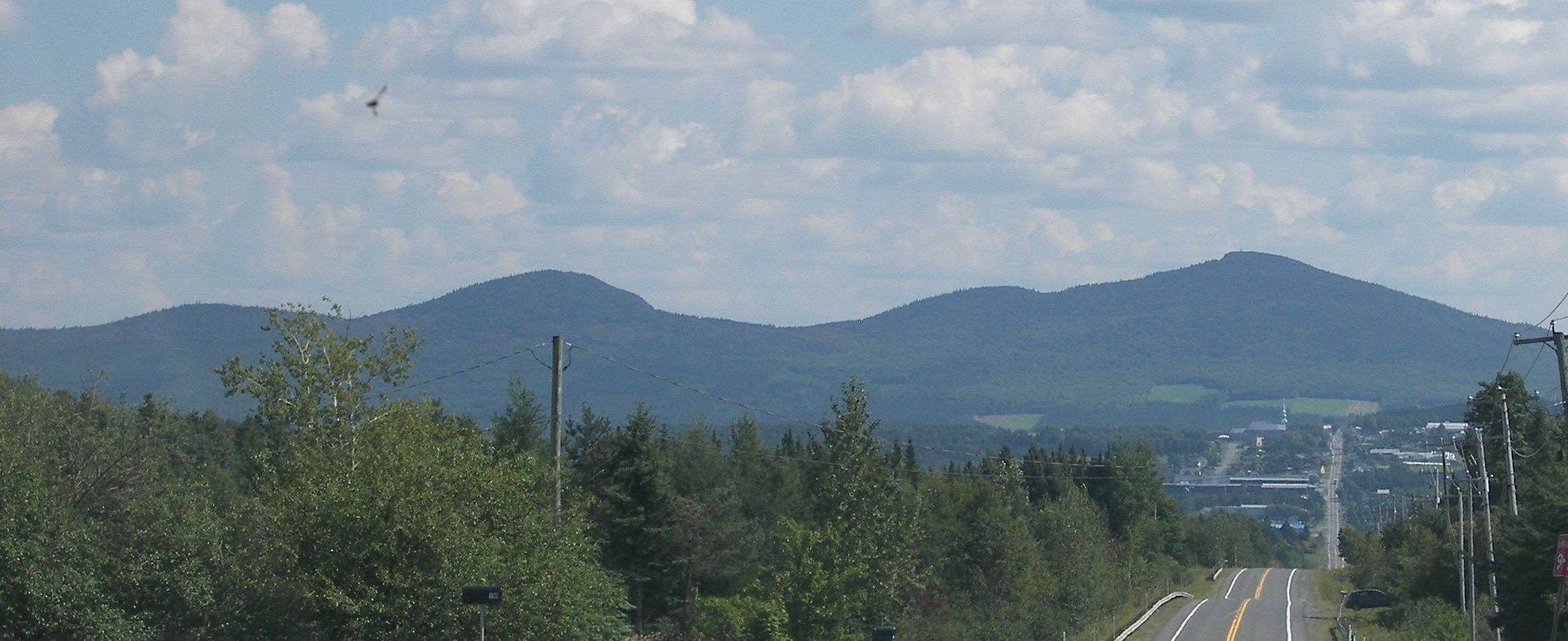

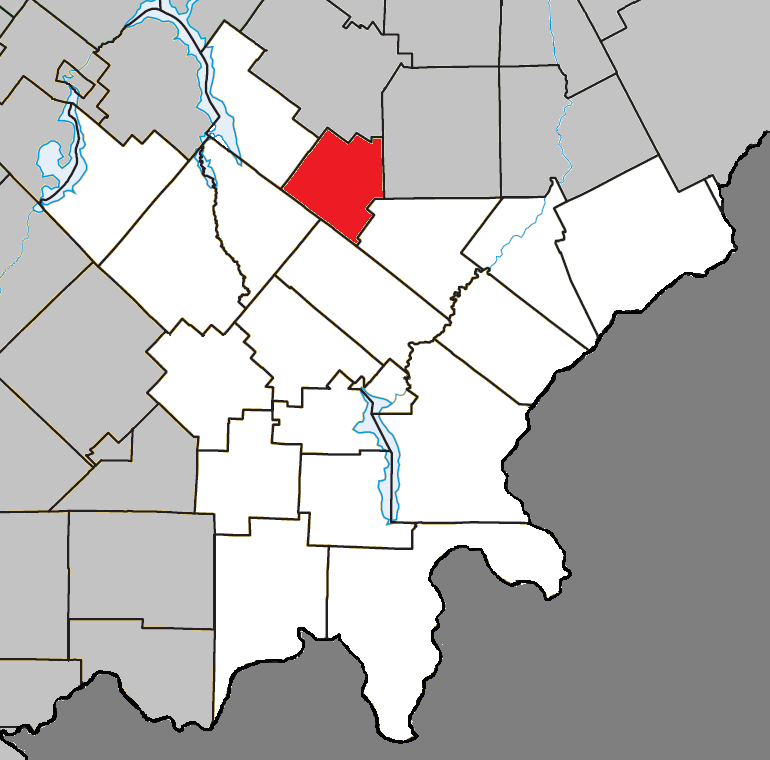
- Location within Le Granit RCM

- Location in southern Quebec
- Coordinates: 45°47′N 70°58′W
- Country: Canada
- Province: Quebec
- Region: Estrie
- RCM: Le Granit
- Constituted: March 15, 1975

Government
  - Mayor: France Bisson
  - Federal riding: Mégantic—L'Érable—Lotbinière
  - Prov. riding: Mégantic

Area
  - Total: 91.10 km^{2} (35.17 sq mi)
  - Land: 91.95 km^{2} (35.50 sq mi)
- There is an apparent contradiction between two authoritative sources

Population (2021)
  - Total: 674
  - Density: 7.3/km^{2} (19/sq mi)
  - Pop 2016-2021: ▲2.6%
  - Dwellings: 329
- Time zone: UTC−5 (EST)
  - Summer (DST): UTC−4 (EDT)
- Postal code(s): G0Y 1M0
- Area code: 819
- Highways: R-263
- Website: www.st-sebastien.com

Saint-Sébastien (French pronunciation: [sɛ̃ sebastjɛ̃]) is a municipality in Le Granit Regional County Municipality in the Estrie region of Quebec, Canada. It is named after Saint Sebastian, who died c. 288.

== History ==
Settled in 1846 by people from Saint-Anselme, Sainte-Claire, Saint-Lambert (Lévis) and Saint-Charles-de-Bellechasse, they founded Aylmer in 1855. The church of Saint-Sébastien was completed in 1889. In 1904, a section of Aylmer was taken for the creation of Courcelles. In 1933, the village section of Aylmer split off to became Saint-Sébstien. In 1958 Aylmer also changed its name to Saint-Sébastien. In 1975, both Saint-Sébastien merged to create the current municipality of Saint-Sébastien.

== Demographics ==
In the 2021 Census of Population conducted by Statistics Canada, Saint-Sébastien had a population of 674 living in 301 of its 329 total private dwellings, a change of 2.6% from its 2016 population of 657. With a land area of 91.95 km^{2} (35.50 sq mi), it had a population density of 7.3/km^{2} (19.0/sq mi) in 2021.

== Notable people ==
The politician Madeleine Bélanger and the novelist Andrée A. Michaud were born in Saint-Sébastien.
