= Daniel Bouchard =

Canadian politician (born 1968)

Daniel Bouchard (born February 6, 1968, in Quebec City) is a Quebec politician and was a member of the National Assembly of Quebec.

He was elected to the National Assembly for the constituency of Mégantic-Compton in the 2003 Quebec general election as a Liberal. He sat as an independent after March 16, 2004. He did not run for re-election in the 2007 election.
