= Marston, Quebec =

Marston
- Township municipality
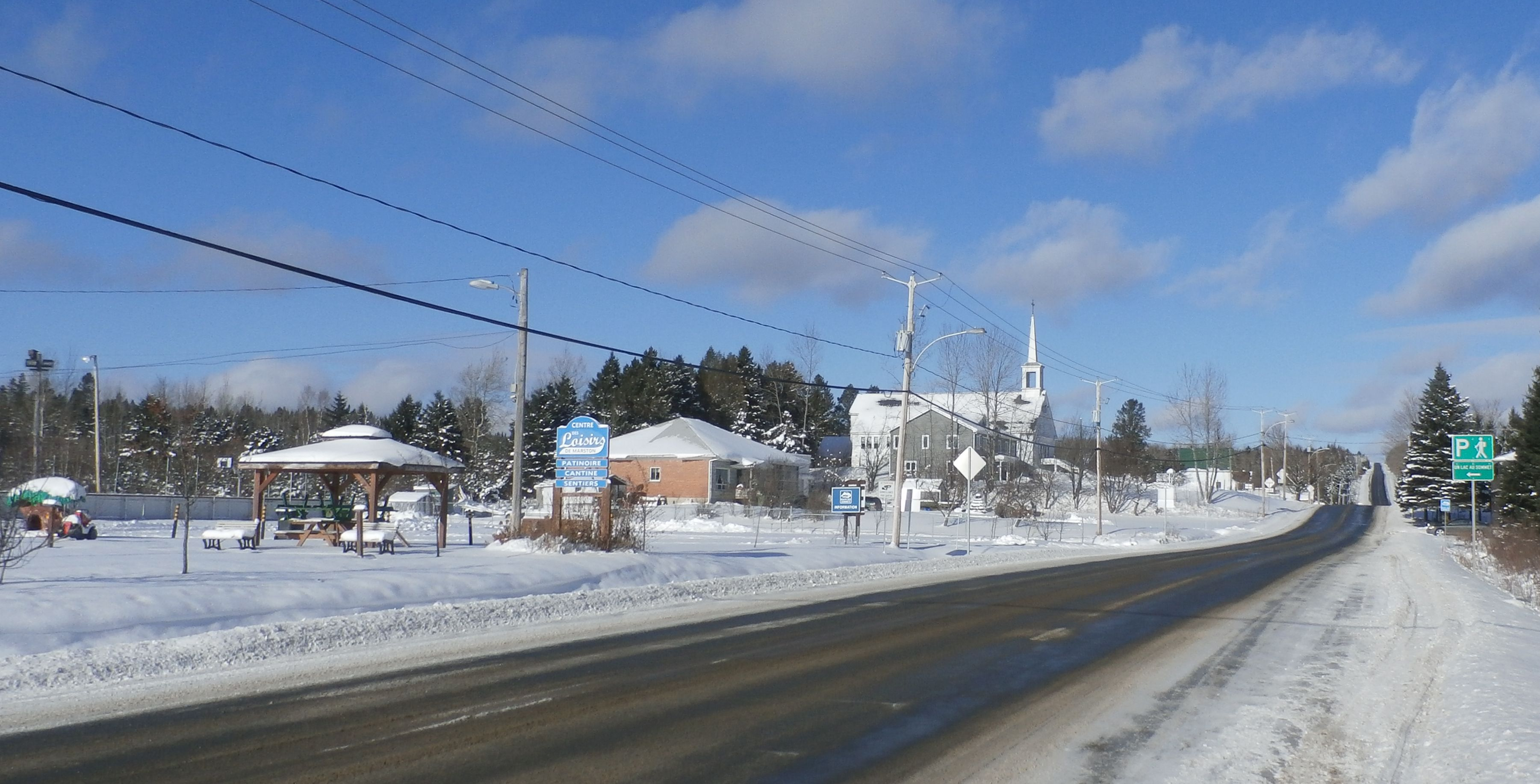

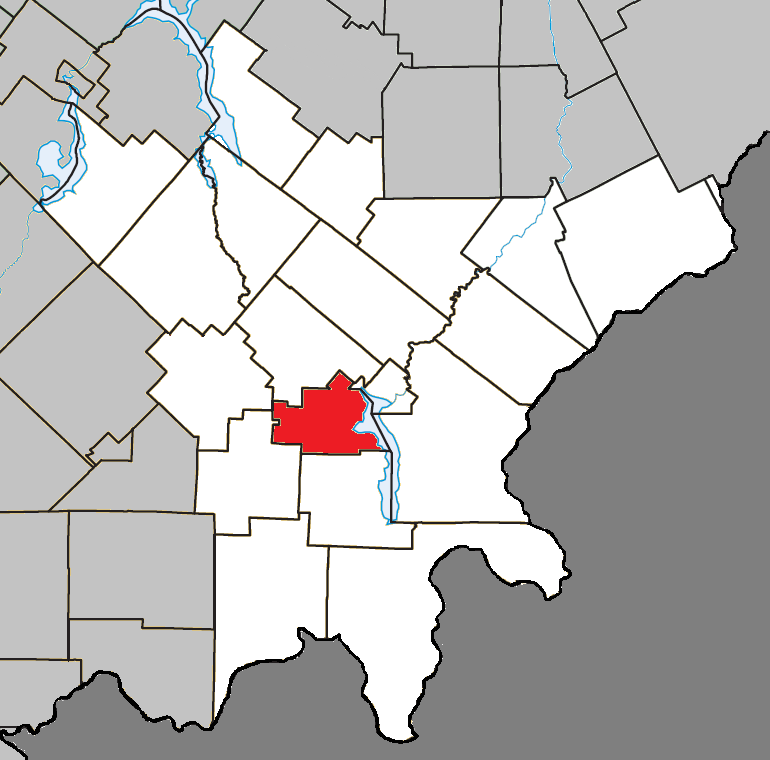
- Location within Le Granit RCM

- Location in southern Quebec
- Coordinates: 45°30′N 71°00′W
- Country: Canada
- Province: Quebec
- Region: Estrie
- RCM: Le Granit
- Constituted: January 1, 1874

Government
  - Mayor: Louis Gendron
  - Federal riding: Mégantic—L'Érable—Lotbinière
  - Prov. riding: Mégantic

Area
  - Total: 78.70 km^{2} (30.39 sq mi)
  - Land: 71.83 km^{2} (27.73 sq mi)

Population (2021)
  - Total: 777
  - Density: 10.8/km^{2} (28/sq mi)
  - Pop 2016-2021: ▲10.2%
  - Dwellings: 419
- Time zone: UTC−5 (EST)
  - Summer (DST): UTC−4 (EDT)
- Postal code(s): G0Y 1G0
- Area code: 819
- Highways: R-263
- Website: www.munmarston.qc.ca

Marston is a township municipality in Le Granit Regional County Municipality in the Estrie region in Quebec, Canada. A township municipality is all or part of the territory of a township (townships were originally only a land surveying feature) set up as a municipality.

It is named after Long Marston, North Yorkshire in England.

== Demographics ==
In the 2021 Census of Population conducted by Statistics Canada, Marston had a population of 777 living in 341 of its 419 total private dwellings, a change of 10.2% from its 2016 population of 705. With a land area of 71.83 km^{2} (27.73 sq mi), it had a population density of 10.8/km^{2} (28.0/sq mi) in 2021.

Population trend:

Census	Population	Change (%)
2021	777	▲10.2%
2016	705	▲6.5%
2011	662	▼3.1%
2006	683	▲9.6%
2001	623	▲4.7%
1996	595	▲20.9%
1991	492	▲4.9%
1986	469	▲26.1%
1981	372	▲30.1%
1976	286	▲15.3%
1971	248	▼9.8%
1966	275	▼3.5%
1961	285	▼28.0%
1956	396	▲8.5%
1951	365	▼29.0%
1941	471	▲45.8%
1931	323	▼33.3%
1921	484	▼7.1%
1911	521	▼21.1%
1901	660	▼2.2%
1891	675	▲34.5%
1881	502	N/A

Mother tongue language (2021)

Language	Population	Pct (%)
French only	755	96.8%
English only	10	1.3%
Both English and French	5	0.6%
Other languages	5	0.6%

== See also ==
Types of municipalities in Quebec
