= Lake Mégantic =

Lake Mégantic Lac Mégantic
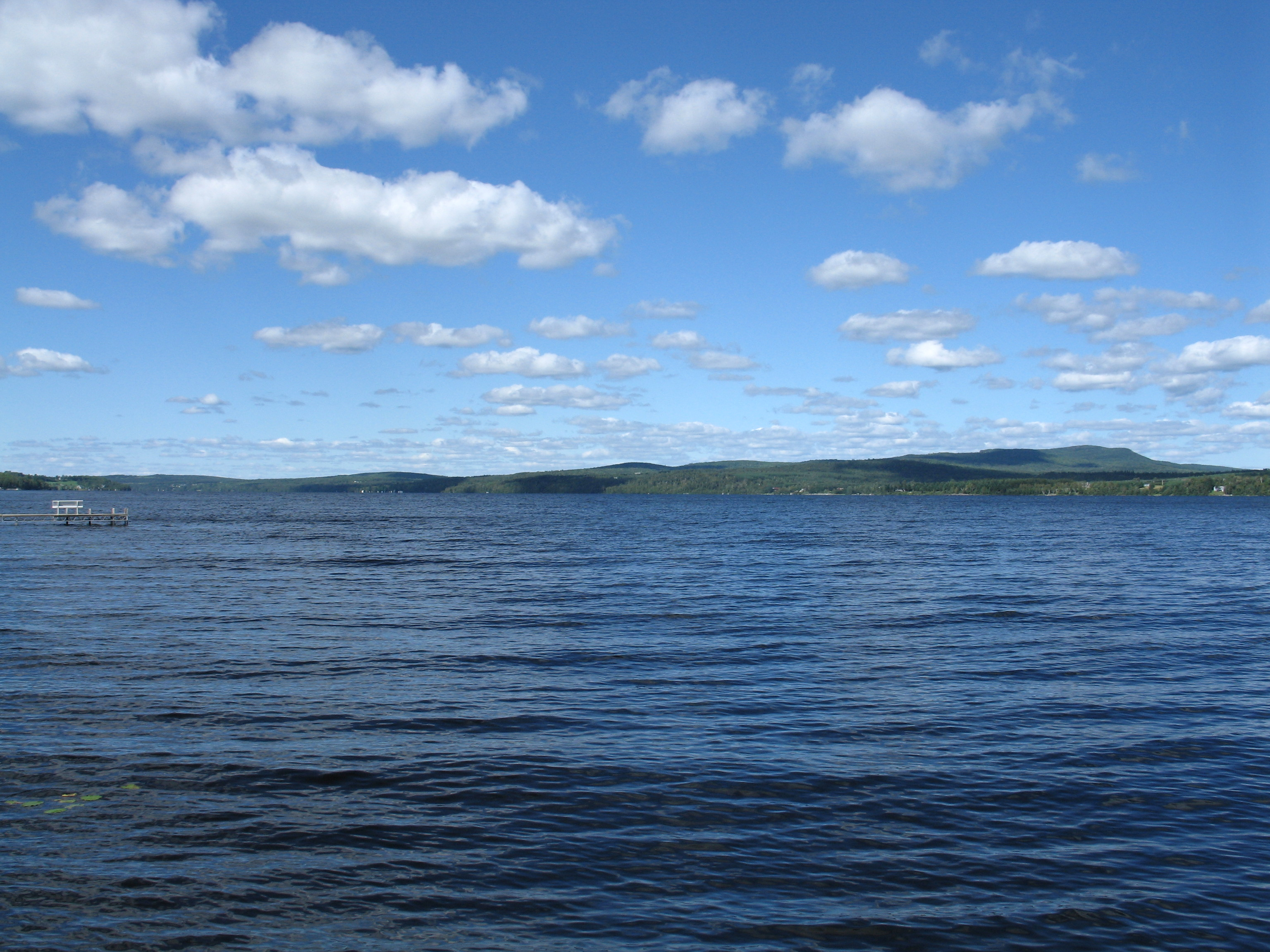
- Lake Mégantic in Piopolis

- Location within Quebec
- Location: Le Granit Regional County Municipality, Estrie, Quebec, Canada
- Coordinates: 45°30′50″N 70°52′38″W
- Type: Glacial lake
- Primary inflows: Arnold River
- Primary outflows: Chaudière River
- Basin countries: Canada
- Max. length: 16 kilometres (9.9 mi)
- Max. width: 3.5 kilometres (2.2 mi)
- Surface area: 26.4 square kilometres (10.2 sq mi)
- Average depth: 75 m (246 ft)
- Shore length^{1}: 45.4 km (28.2 mi)
- Surface elevation: 395 metres (1,296 ft)
- Settlements: Lac-Mégantic, Frontenac, Marston, and Piopolis
- ^{1} Shore length is not a well-defined measure.

Lake Mégantic (French: Lac Mégantic, French pronunciation: [lak meɡɑ̃tik]) is a large body of water in Québec, Canada, located in the Appalachian Mountains near the U.S. border. It is a source of the Chaudière River which drains into the St Lawrence River at Québec City. The lake has a surface area of 26.4 km^{2} (10.2 sq mi) with several villages and small towns on its shores, including Lac-Mégantic, Frontenac, Marston, and Piopolis. It is part of Le Granit Regional County Municipality, a rural region where forestry and granite extraction are important activities.

== Toponymy ==
The name may derive from Namagôntekw, which in the Abenaki language means place where there is trout in the lake. The name has had many variants, including Amaguntik on maps documenting the 1775 American invasion of Quebec.

== Physical geography ==
The water surface is 395 m (1,296 ft) above mean sea level and the lake has an average depth of 75 m (246 ft); its total surface area is 26.4 square kilometres (10.2 sq mi), with a total shoreline of 45.4 km (28.2 mi). Its length is about 16 km (9.9 mi) and it has an average width of 3.5 km (2.2 mi).

== Conservation ==
It is the site of the Lake Megantic Marsh, a 755 hectare habitat that hosts migratory birds and is a breeding site.
