= Val-Racine =

- Municipality
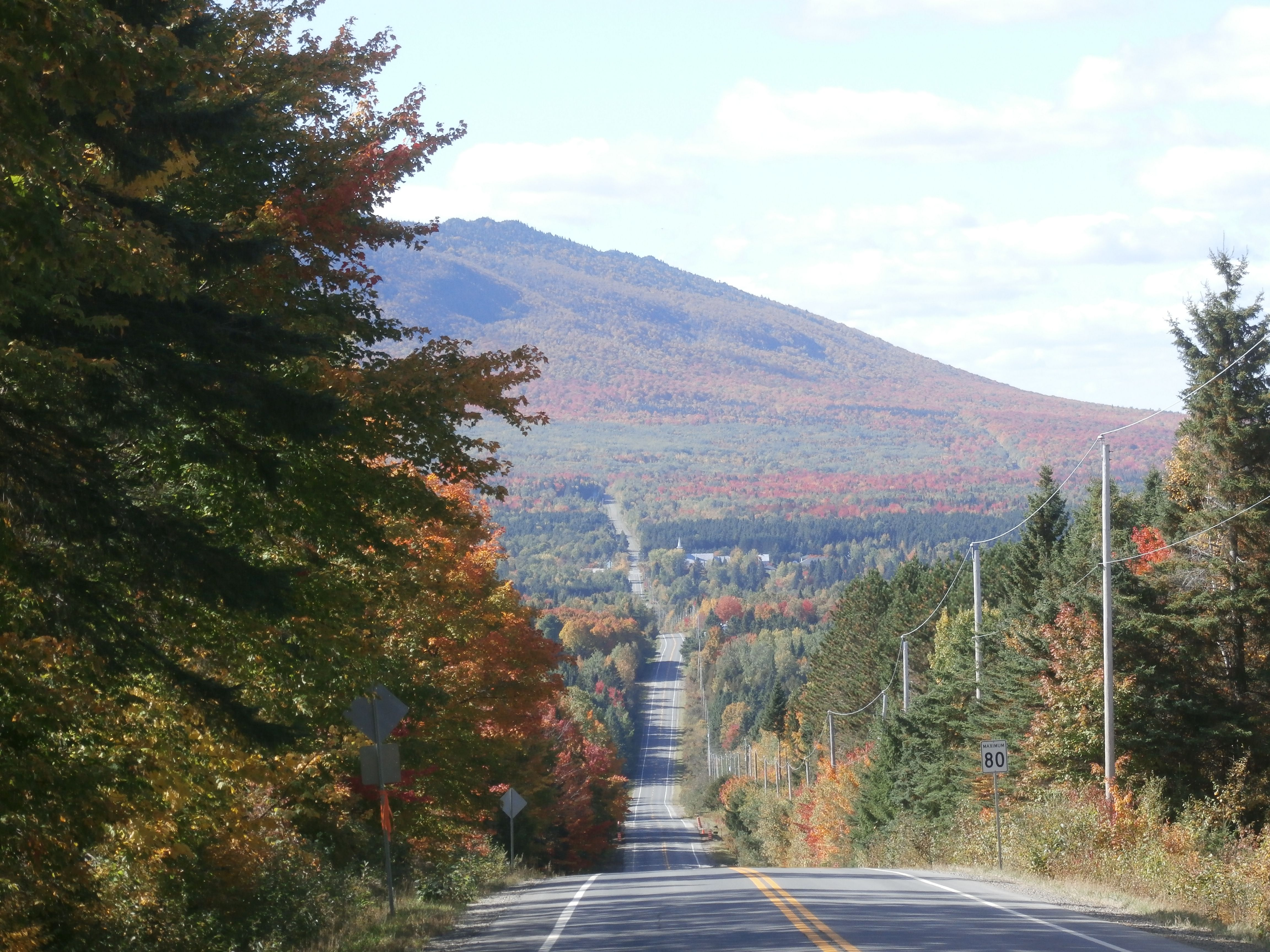

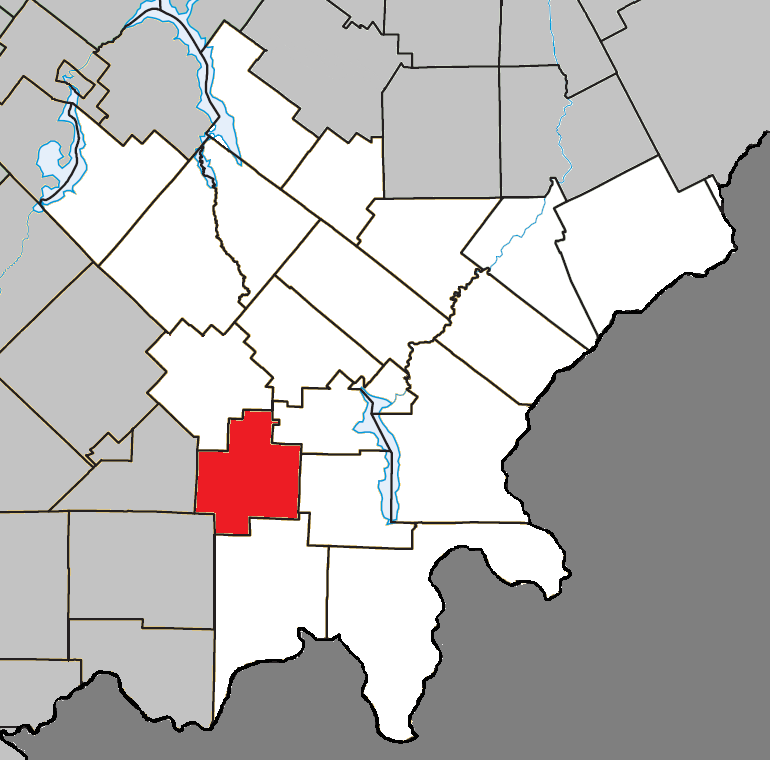
- Location within Le Granit RCM

- Location in southern Quebec
- Coordinates: 45°29′N 71°04′W
- Country: Canada
- Province: Quebec
- Region: Estrie
- RCM: Le Granit
- Constituted: April 26, 1907

Government
  - Mayor: Éric Morency
  - Federal riding: Mégantic—L'Érable—Lotbinière
  - Prov. riding: Mégantic

Area
  - Total: 118.60 km^{2} (45.79 sq mi)
  - Land: 116.06 km^{2} (44.81 sq mi)

Population (2021)
  - Total: 183
  - Density: 1.6/km^{2} (4.1/sq mi)
  - Pop 2016-2021: ▲2.8%
  - Dwellings: 132
- Time zone: UTC−5 (EST)
  - Summer (DST): UTC−4 (EDT)
- Postal code(s): G0Y 1E1
- Area code: 819
- Highways: No major routes
- Website: www.municipalite.val-racine.qc.ca

Val-Racine (French pronunciation: [val ʁasin]) is a municipality in Quebec, Canada.

== Attractions ==
Mont-Mégantic National Park is situated, in part, within the Val-Racine area. Within the park, Mont Saint-Joseph and Mont Victoria are situated within the municipality’s boundaries.
