= Saint-Augustin-de-Woburn =

- Parish municipality

- Seal

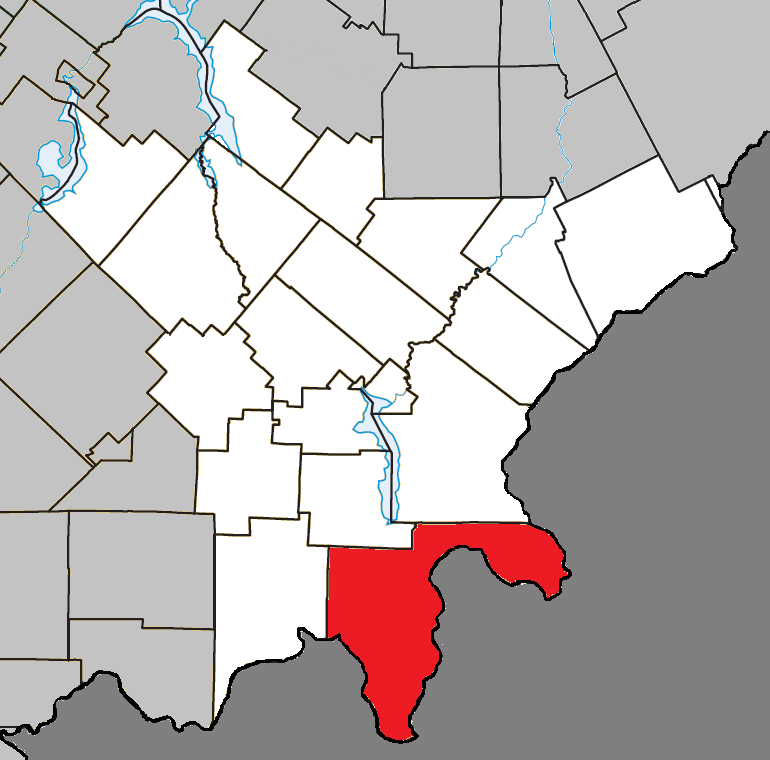
- Location within Le Granit RCM

- Location in southern Quebec
- Coordinates: 45°23′N 70°51′W
- Country: Canada
- Province: Quebec
- Region: Estrie
- RCM: Le Granit
- Constituted: January 13, 1900

Government
  - Mayor: Jonathan Parisé
  - Federal riding: Mégantic—L'Érable—Lotbinière
  - Prov. riding: Mégantic

Area
  - Total: 284.10 km^{2} (109.69 sq mi)
  - Land: 281.07 km^{2} (108.52 sq mi)

Population (2021)
  - Total: 667
  - Density: 2.4/km^{2} (6.2/sq mi)
  - Pop 2016-2021: ▼3.6%
  - Dwellings: 354
- Time zone: UTC−5 (EST)
  - Summer (DST): UTC−4 (EDT)
- Postal code(s): G0Y 1R0
- Area code: 819
- Highways: R-161; R-212; R-263

Saint-Augustin-de-Woburn is a parish municipality in Le Granit Regional County Municipality in the Estrie region of Quebec, Canada. The population is 667 as of the Canada 2021 Census. A parish municipality is the territory of a parish established as a municipality. Settlement began around 1880. It is the site of Coburn Gore–Woburn Border Crossing along the Canada–United States border. Mount Gosford lies entirely within the parish, making Woburn one of the highest towns in Quebec, at an altitude of 1,193 metres (3,914 ft).

== Demographics ==
In the 2021 Census of Population conducted by Statistics Canada, Saint-Augustin-de-Woburn had a population of 667 living in 309 of its 354 total private dwellings, a change of −3.6% from its 2016 population of 692. With a land area of 281.07 km^{2} (108.52 sq mi), it had a population density of 2.4/km^{2} (6.1/sq mi) in 2021.

== See also ==
- Classification of municipalities in Quebec
