= Piopolis, Quebec =

Piopolis
- Municipality
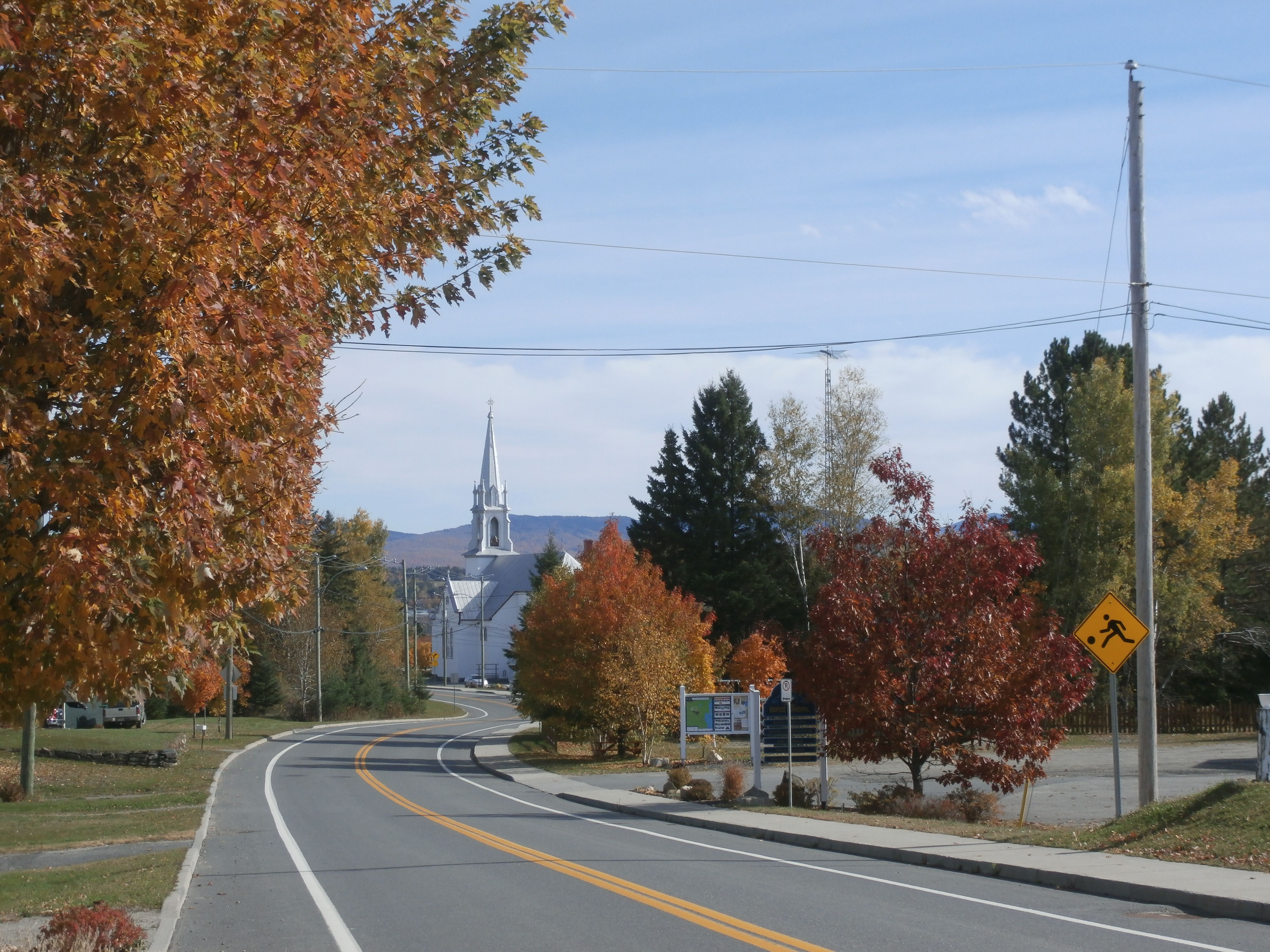
- Road 263 in Piopolis

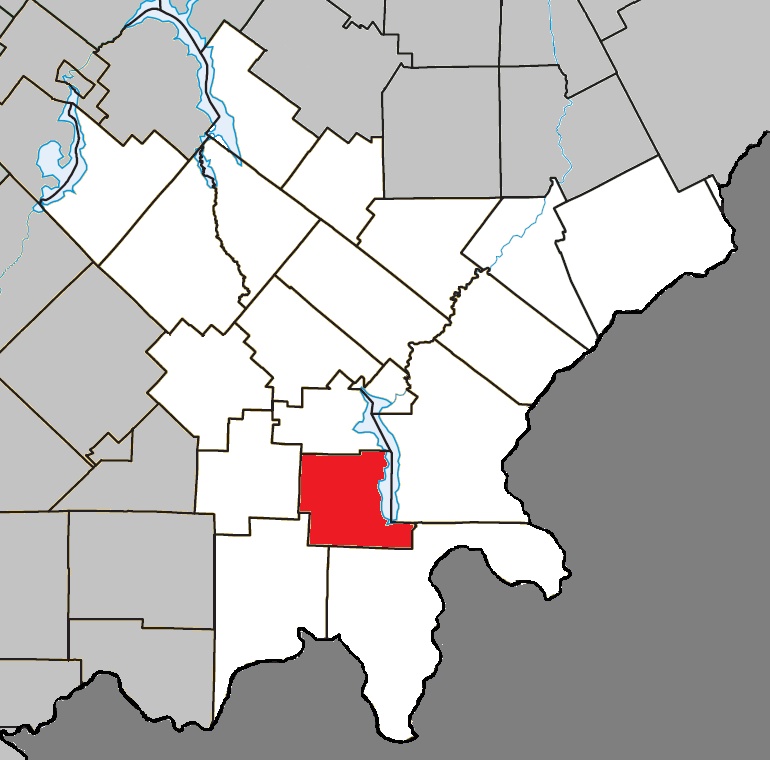
- Location within Le Granit RCM

- Location in southern Quebec
- Coordinates: 45°29′N 70°54′W
- Country: Canada
- Province: Quebec
- Region: Estrie
- RCM: Le Granit
- Constituted: January 1, 1880

Government
  - Mayor: Peter Manning
  - Federal riding: Mégantic—L'Érable—Lotbinière
  - Prov. riding: Mégantic

Area
  - Total: 111.70 km^{2} (43.13 sq mi)
  - Land: 103.38 km^{2} (39.92 sq mi)

Population (2021)
  - Total: 398
  - Density: 3.8/km^{2} (9.8/sq mi)
  - Pop 2016-2021: ▲11.2%
  - Dwellings: 315
- Time zone: UTC−5 (EST)
  - Summer (DST): UTC−4 (EDT)
- Postal code(s): G0Y 1H0
- Area code: 819
- Highways: R-263
- Website: www.piopolis.quebec

Piopolis is a municipality of about 400 people in Le Granit Regional County Municipality in the Estrie region in Quebec, Canada.

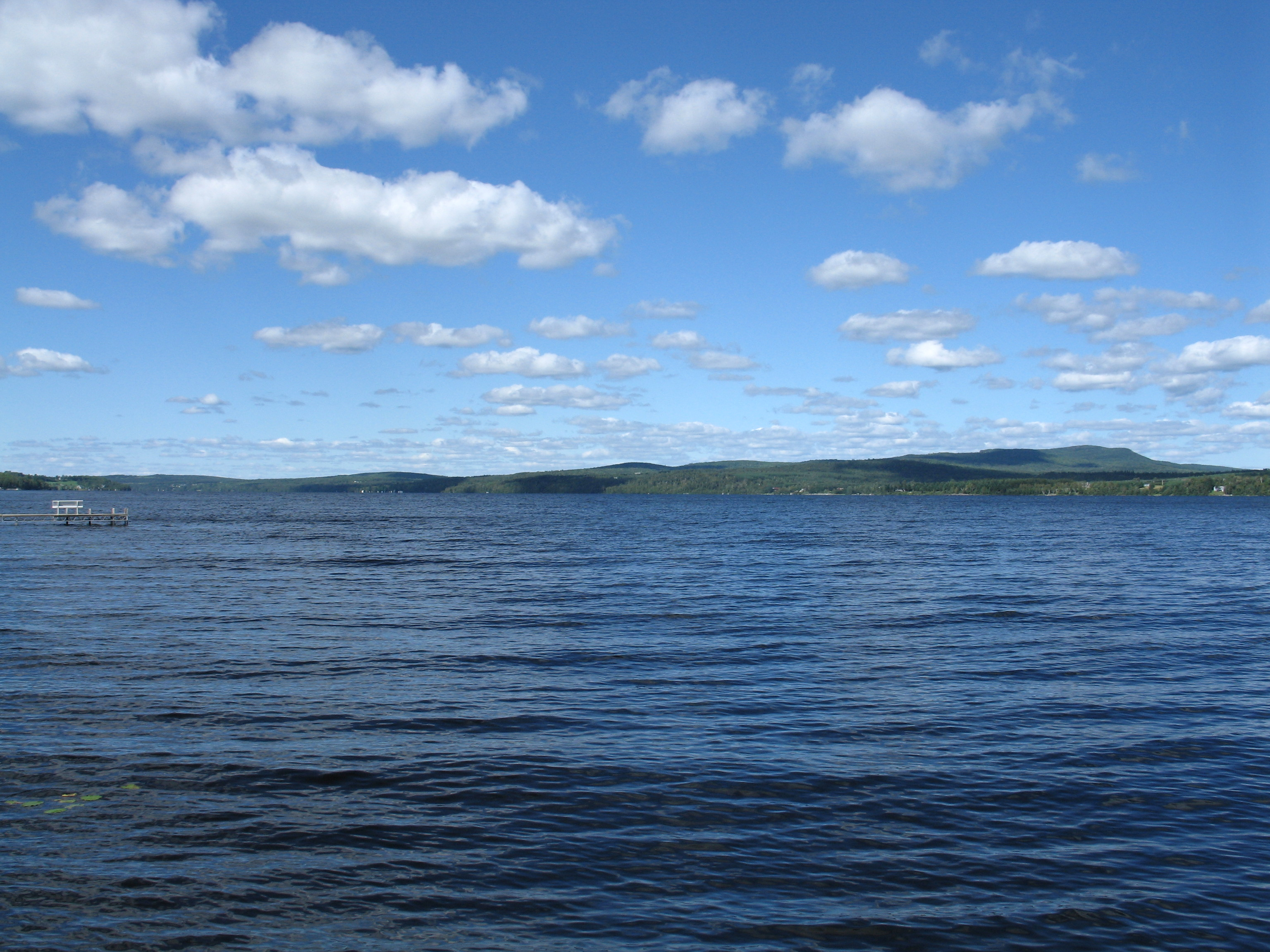
Megantic Lake in Piopolis

The name of the town means, 'city of the Pope' in recognition of the service of loyal Roman Catholics who answered the call by Pope Pius IX to defend The Vatican in 1860. A group of 14 returned Papal Zouaves, led by a missionary priest departed Montreal in 1871 and traveled by rail, stagecoach and on foot to land grants on the borders of the diocese of Trois-Rivières, in the township of Marston, on the edge of Lake Mégantic to build a new city dedicated to Pope Pius IX who they had served in Rome. There they discovered only a small logging camp building.

Piopolis was officially founded on September 24, 1871. All but one of the original settlers left over the following decades. At its peak, the parish's population was in 1932 with 37 families and 523 souls. In 2011, la Halte des Zouaves was opened as a tourist stop on the Route des Sommets to display the history of the Municipality. La Halte des Zouaves is located in front of the old fire tower. The present day population is approximately 400 and supports several small businesses, the municipal office, and garage.
