= 24th Quebec Legislature =

The 24th Legislative Assembly of Quebec was the Quebec, Canada provincial legislature that existed from July 16, 1952, to June 20, 1956. This assembly marked the third consecutive term of the Union Nationale as the governing party and the fourth under the leadership of Maurice Duplessis.

== Seats per political party ==
- After the 1952 elections

Affiliation	Members
Union Nationale	68
Liberal	23
Independent	1
Total	92
Government Majority	45

== Member list ==
This was the list of members of the Legislative Assembly of Quebec that were elected in the 1952 election:

Name	Party	Riding	First elected / previously elected	No. of terms
Jacques Miquelon	Union Nationale	Abitibi-Est	1948	2nd term
Émile Lesage	Union Nationale	Abitibi-Ouest	1936, 1944	4th term*
William McOuat Cottingham	Union Nationale	Argenteuil	1948	2nd term
Wilfrid Labbé	Union Nationale	Arthabaska	1948	2nd term
Daniel Johnson	Union Nationale	Bagot	1946	3rd term
Georges-Octave Poulin	Union Nationale	Beauce	1945	3rd term
Edgar Hébert	Union Nationale	Beauharnois	1948	2nd term
Alphée Poirier	Union Nationale	Bellechasse	1952	1st term
Azellus Lavallée	Union Nationale	Berthier	1948	2nd term
Henri Jolicoeur	Union Nationale	Bonaventure	1936, 1944	4th term*
Charles James Warwick Fox	Union Nationale	Brome	1948	2nd term
John Redmond Roche	Union Nationale	Chambly	1948	2nd term
Maurice Bellemare	Union Nationale	Champlain	1944	3rd term
Arthur Leclerc	Union Nationale	Charlevoix	1936, 1944	4th term*
Arthur Laberge	Union Nationale	Châteauguay	1948	2nd term
Antonio Talbot	Union Nationale	Chicoutimi	1938	5th term
Charles Daniel French	Union Nationale	Compton	1946	3rd term
John William French (1954)	Union Nationale	Compton	1954	1st term
Paul Sauvé	Union Nationale	Deux-Montagnes	1930, 1936	7th term*
Joseph-Damase Bégin	Union Nationale	Dorchester	1935	6th term
Bernard Pinard	Libéral	Drummond	1952	1st term
Gérard Noel	Libéral	Frontenac	1952	1st term
Alphonse Couturier	Union Nationale	Gaspé-Nord	1952	1st term
Camille-Eugène Pouliot	Union Nationale	Gaspé-Sud	1936	5th term
Gérard Desjardins	Union Nationale	Gatineau	1948	2nd term
Alexandre Taché	Union Nationale	Hull	1936, 1944	4th term*
Henry Somerville	Union Nationale	Huntingdon	1952	1st term
Yvon Thuot	Union Nationale	Iberville	1944	3rd term
Hormisdas Langlais	Union Nationale	Îles-de-la-Madeleine	1936	5th term
Charles-Aimé Kirkland	Libéral	Jacques-Cartier	1939	4th term
Antonio Barrette	Union Nationale	Joliette	1936	5th term
Alfred Plourde	Union Nationale	Kamouraska	1948	2nd term
Albiny Paquette	Union Nationale	Labelle	1935	6th term
Antonio Auger	Union Nationale	Lac-Saint-Jean	1948	2nd term
Victor-Stanislas Chartrand	Union Nationale	L'Assomption	1944	3rd term
Omer Barrière	Union Nationale	Laval	1948	2nd term
Charles Romulus Ducharme	Union Nationale	Laviolette	1935, 1944	5th term*
Raynold Bélanger	Libéral	Lévis	1952	1st term
Fernand Lizotte	Union Nationale	L'Islet	1948	2nd term
René Bernatchez	Union Nationale	Lotbinière	1948	2nd term
Alcide Montpetit	Libéral	Maisonneuve	1952	1st term
Germain Caron	Union Nationale	Maskinongé	1944	3rd term
Onésime Gagnon	Union Nationale	Matane	1936	5th term
Philippe Cossette	Union Nationale	Matapédia	1944	3rd term
Clovis Gagnon (1953)	Union Nationale	Matapédia	1953	1st term
Tancrède Labbé	Union Nationale	Mégantic	1935, 1940	6th term*
Jean-Jacques Bertrand	Union Nationale	Missisquoi	1948	2nd term
Maurice Tellier	Union Nationale	Montcalm	1936, 1944	4th term*
Antoine Rivard	Union Nationale	Montmagny	1948	2nd term
Yves Prévost	Union Nationale	Montmorency	1948	2nd term
Jean-Paul Noël	Libéral	Montréal–Jeanne-Mance	1952	1st term
Paul Provençal	Union Nationale	Montréal-Laurier	1948	2nd term
Arsène Gagné (1955)	Union Nationale	Montréal-Laurier	1955	1st term
Gérard Thibeault	Union Nationale	Montréal-Mercier	1936, 1948	3rd term*
Paul Earl	Libéral	Montréal–Notre-Dame-de-Grâce	1948	2nd term
Henri Groulx	Libéral	Montréal-Outremont	1939	4th term
Georges-Émile Lapalme (1953)	Libéral	Montréal-Outremont	1953	1st term
Francis Hanley	Independent	Montréal–Sainte-Anne	1948	2nd term
Yvon Dupuis	Libéral	Montréal–Sainte-Marie	1952	1st term
Philippe Lalonde	Libéral	Montréal–Saint-Henri	1952	1st term
Omer Côté	Union Nationale	Montréal–Saint-Jacques	1944	3rd term
Dave Rochon	Libéral	Montréal–Saint-Louis	1948	2nd term
Lionel-Alfred Ross	Libéral	Montréal-Verdun	1944	3rd term
Hercule Riendeau	Union Nationale	Napierville-Laprairie	1944	3rd term
Camille Roy	Union Nationale	Nicolet	1952	1st term
Roméo Lorrain	Union Nationale	Papineau	1935	6th term
Raymond Thomas Johnston	Union Nationale	Pontiac	1948	2nd term
Bona Dussault	Union Nationale	Portneuf	1935, 1944	5th term*
Rosaire Chalifour (1953)	Union Nationale	Portneuf	1953	1st term
Maurice Cloutier	Union Nationale	Québec-Centre	1952	1st term
Jean-Jacques Bédard	Libéral	Québec-Comté	1952	1st term
Joseph-Antonin Marquis	Libéral	Québec-Est	1952	1st term
Jules Savard	Libéral	Québec-Ouest	1952	1st term
Gérard Cournoyer	Libéral	Richelieu	1952	1st term
Émilien Lafrance	Libéral	Richmond	1952	1st term
Alfred Dubé	Union Nationale	Rimouski	1936, 1944	4th term*
Roméo Gagné	Union Nationale	Rivière-du-Loup	1948	2nd term
Antoine Marcotte	Union Nationale	Roberval	1944	3rd term
Laurent Barré	Union Nationale	Rouville	1931, 1944	6th term*
Guy Dallaire	Union Nationale	Rouyn-Noranda	1948	2nd term
Pierre Ouellet	Union Nationale	Saguenay	1948	2nd term
Ernest-Joseph Chartier	Union Nationale	Saint-Hyacinthe	1944	3rd term
Pierre-Jacques-François Bousquet (1955)	Union Nationale	Saint-Hyacinthe	1955	1st term
Jean-Paul Beaulieu	Union Nationale	Saint-Jean	1941	4th term
René Hamel	Libéral	Saint-Maurice	1952	1st term
Francis Boudreau	Union Nationale	Saint-Sauveur	1948	2nd term
Gaston Ledoux	Libéral	Shefford	1952	1st term
John Samuel Bourque	Union Nationale	Sherbrooke	1935	6th term
Léon-Denis Gérin	Union Nationale	Stanstead	1948	2nd term
Paul-Oliva Goulet	Libéral	Témiscamingue	1939, 1952	2nd term*
Antoine Raymond	Union Nationale	Témiscouata	1952	1st term
Joseph-Léonard Blanchard	Union Nationale	Terrebonne	1944	3rd term
Maurice Duplessis	Union Nationale	Trois-Rivières	1927	8th term
Joseph-Édouard Jeannotte	Union Nationale	Vaudreuil-Soulanges	1948	2nd term
Arthur Dupré	Libéral	Verchères	1944	3rd term
George Carlyle Marler	Libéral	Westmount–Saint-Georges	1942	4th term
John Richard Hyde (1955)	Libéral	Westmount–Saint-Georges	1955	1st term
Gérard Lemieux	Libéral	Wolfe	1952	1st term
Antonio Élie	Union Nationale	Yamaska	1931	7th term

== Other elected MLAs ==
Other MLAs were elected during by-elections in this mandate

- Clovis Gagnon, Union Nationale, Matapédia, July 9, 1953
- Georges-Émile Lapalme, Quebec Liberal Party, Montréal-Outremont, July 9, 1953
- Rosaire Chalifour, Union Nationale, Portneuf, July 9, 1953
- John William French, Union Nationale, Compton, September 15, 1954
- Arsène Gagné, Union Nationale, Montréal-Laurier, July 6, 1955
- Pierre-Jacques-François Bousquet, Union Nationale, Saint-Hyacinthe, July 6, 1955
- John Richard Hyde, Quebec Liberal Party, Westmount-Saint-Georges, July 6, 1955

== Cabinet Ministers ==
- Prime Minister and Executive Council President: Maurice Duplessis
- Agriculture: Laurent Barrée
- Colonization: Joseph-Damase Begin
- Labour: Antonio Barrette
- Public Works: Roméo Lorrain
- Social Welfare and Youth: Paul Sauvé
- Health: Albiny Paquette
- Lands and Forests: John Samuel Bourque
- Hunting and Coastal Fisheries: Camille-Eugène Pouliot
- Mines: Charles Daniel French (1952-1954), William McOuat Cottingham (1954-1956)
- Hydraulic resources: John Samuel Bourque
- Roads: Antonio Talbot
- Transportation and Communications: Antoine Rivard (1954-1956)
- Municipal Affairs: Bona Dussault (1952-1953), Yves Prevost (1953-1956)
- Industry and Commerce: Jean-Paul Beaulieu
- Attorney General: Maurice Duplessis
- Provincial Secretary: Omer Côté (1952-1956), Romeo Lorrain (1956)
- Solicitor General: Antoine Rivard
- Finances: Onésime Gagnon
- State Ministers: Arthur Leclerc, Jacques Miquelon, Wilfrid Labbé

== New electoral ridings ==
The electoral map was slightly modified in 1954 with the creation of Jonquière-Kenogami from parts of Chicoutimi. The change was effective in the 1956 elections.
