= 22nd Quebec Legislature =

Legislative session

The 22nd Legislative Assembly of Quebec was the Quebec, Canada provincial legislature that existed from August 8, 1944, to July 28, 1948. The Union Nationale led by Maurice Duplessis returned to power after defeating the Quebec Liberal Party led by Adélard Godbout who defeated the Union Nationale in the 1939 elections. It was the first of four consecutive terms by the UN until 1960.

== Seats per political party ==
- After the 1944 elections

Affiliation	Members
Union Nationale	48
Liberal	37
Bloc populaire	4
Co-operative Commonwealth	1
Nationaliste	1
Total	91
Government Majority	11

== Member list ==
This was the list of members of the Legislative Assembly of Quebec that were elected in the 1944 election:

Name	Party	Riding	First elected / previously elected	No. of terms
Henri Drouin	Libéral	Abitibi-Est	1944	1st term
Émile Lesage	Union Nationale	Abitibi-Ouest	1936, 1944	2nd term*
Georges-Étienne Dansereau	Libéral	Argenteuil	1935	4th term
Pierre-Horace Plourde	Libéral	Arthabaska	1944	1st term
Cyrille Dumaine	Libéral	Bagot	1935, 1939	3rd term*
Daniel Johnson (1946)	Union Nationale	Bagot	1946	1st term
Édouard Lacroix	Bloc populaire canadien	Beauce	1944	1st term
Georges-Octave Poulin (1945)	Union Nationale	Beauce	1945	1st term
Albert Lemieux	Bloc populaire canadien	Beauharnois	1944	1st term
Valmore Bienvenue	Libéral	Bellechasse	1939	2nd term
Armand Sylvestre	Libéral	Berthier	1944	1st term
Henri Jolicoeur	Union Nationale	Bonaventure	1936, 1944	2nd term*
Jonathan Robinson	Union Nationale	Brome	1936	3rd term
Dowina-Évariste Joyal	Libéral	Chambly	1939	2nd term
Maurice Bellemare	Union Nationale	Champlain	1944	1st term
Arthur Leclerc	Union Nationale	Charlevoix-Saguenay	1936, 1944	2nd term*
Honoré Mercier III	Libéral	Châteauguay	1944	1st term
Antonio Talbot	Union Nationale	Chicoutimi	1938	3rd term
William James Duffy	Libéral	Compton	1931, 1939	3rd term*
Charles Daniel French (1946)	Union Nationale	Compton	1946	1st term
Paul Sauvé	Union Nationale	Deux-Montagnes	1930, 1936	5th term*
Joseph-Damase Bégin	Union Nationale	Dorchester	1935	4th term
Robert Bernard	Union Nationale	Drummond	1944	1st term
Patrice Tardif	Union Nationale	Frontenac	1935, 1944	3rd term*
Joseph-Alphonse Pelletier	Union Nationale	Gaspé-Nord	1936, 1944	2nd term*
Camille-Eugène Pouliot	Union Nationale	Gaspé-Sud	1936	3rd term
Joseph-Célestin Nadon	Libéral	Gatineau	1939	2nd term
Alexandre Taché	Union Nationale	Hull	1936, 1944	2nd term*
Dennis James O'Connor	Libéral	Huntingdon	1941	2nd term
John Gillies Rennie (1947)	Union Nationale	Huntingdon	1947	1st term
Yvon Thuot	Union Nationale	Iberville	1944	1st term
Hormisdas Langlais	Union Nationale	Îles-de-la-Madeleine	1936	3rd term
Charles-Aimé Kirkland	Libéral	Jacques-Cartier	1939	2nd term
Antonio Barrette	Union Nationale	Joliette	1936	3rd term
Louis Philippe Lizotte	Libéral	Kamouraska	1944	1st term
Albiny Paquette	Union Nationale	Labelle	1935	4th term
Joseph-Ludger Fillion	Libéral	Lac-Saint-Jean	1931, 1939	3rd term*
Victor-Stanislas Chartrand	Union Nationale	L'Assomption	1944	1st term
François Leduc	Libéral	Laval	1935	4th term
Charles Romulus Ducharme	Union Nationale	Laviolette	1935, 1944	3rd term*
Joseph-Théophile Larochelle	Union Nationale	Lévis	1935, 1944	3rd term*
Adélard Godbout	Libéral	L'Islet	1929, 1939	5th term*
Guy Roberge	Libéral	Lotbinière	1944	1st term
Albert Gatien	Union Nationale	Maisonneuve	1944	1st term
Germain Caron	Union Nationale	Maskinongé	1944	1st term
Onésime Gagnon	Union Nationale	Matane	1936	3rd term
Philippe Cossette	Union Nationale	Matapédia	1944	1st term
Tancrède Labbé	Union Nationale	Mégantic	1935, 1940	4th term*
Henri A. Gosselin	Libéral	Missisquoi	1939	2nd term
Maurice Tellier	Union Nationale	Montcalm	1936, 1944	2nd term*
Fernand Choquette	Libéral	Montmagny	1939	2nd term
Jacques Dumoulin	Libéral	Montmorency	1939	2nd term
Joseph-Émile Dubreuil	Libéral	Montréal–Jeanne-Mance	1939	2nd term
André Laurendeau	Bloc populaire canadien	Montréal-Laurier	1944	1st term
André Laurendeau	Independent	Montréal-Laurier	1944	1st term
Joseph-Achille Francoeur	Libéral	Montréal-Mercier	1931, 1939	3rd term*
James Arthur Mathewson	Libéral	Montréal–Notre-Dame-de-Grâce	1939	2nd term
Henri Groulx	Libéral	Montréal-Outremont	1939	2nd term
Thomas Guerin	Libéral	Montréal–Sainte-Anne	1942	2nd term
Camille Côté	Union Nationale	Montréal–Sainte-Marie	1944	1st term
Joseph-Hormisdas Delisle	Union Nationale	Montréal–Saint-Henri	1944	1st term
Omer Côté	Union Nationale	Montréal–Saint-Jacques	1944	1st term
Maurice Hartt	Libéral	Montréal–Saint-Louis	1939	2nd term
Lionel-Alfred Ross	Libéral	Montréal-Verdun	1944	1st term
Hercule Riendeau	Union Nationale	Napierville-Laprairie	1944	1st term
Émery Fleury	Union Nationale	Nicolet	1936, 1944	2nd term*
Roméo Lorrain	Union Nationale	Papineau	1935	4th term
Edward Charles Lawn	Libéral	Pontiac	1935	4th term
Bona Dussault	Union Nationale	Portneuf	1935, 1944	3rd term*
Joseph-William Morin	Libéral	Québec-Centre	1939	2nd term
René Chaloult	Nationaliste (Note: First elected as a Union Nationale candidate)	Québec-Comté	1936	3rd term
Henri-Paul Drouin	Libéral	Québec-Est	1944	1st term
Wilfrid Samson	Libéral	Québec-Ouest	1944	1st term
Joseph-Willie Robidoux	Libéral	Richelieu	1942	2nd term
Albert Goudreau	Union Nationale	Richmond	1935, 1944	3rd term*
Alfred Dubé	Union Nationale	Rimouski	1936, 1944	2nd term*
Léon Casgrain	Libéral	Rivière-du-Loup	1927	6th term
Antoine Marcotte	Union Nationale	Roberval	1944	1st term
Laurent Barré	Union Nationale	Rouville	1931, 1944	4th term*
David Côté	Co-operative Commonwealth Federation	Rouyn-Noranda	1944	1st term
David Côté	Independent	Rouyn-Noranda	1944	1st term
Ernest-Joseph Chartier	Union Nationale	Saint-Hyacinthe	1944	1st term
Jean-Paul Beaulieu	Union Nationale	Saint-Jean	1941	2nd term
Marc Trudel	Union Nationale	Saint-Maurice	1935, 1944	3rd term*
Wilfrid Hamel	Libéral	Saint-Sauveur	1939	2nd term
Hector Choquette	Union Nationale	Shefford	1935, 1944	3rd term*
John Samuel Bourque	Union Nationale	Sherbrooke	1935	4th term
Ovila Bergeron	Bloc populaire canadien	Stanstead	1944	1st term
Nil-Élie Larivière	Union Nationale	Témiscamingue	1935, 1944	3rd term*
André Pelletier	Union Nationale	Témiscouata	1944	1st term
Joseph-Léonard Blanchard	Union Nationale	Terrebonne	1944	1st term
Maurice Duplessis	Union Nationale	Trois-Rivières	1927	6th term
Alphide Sabourin	Libéral	Vaudreuil-Soulanges	1939	2nd term
Arthur Dupré	Libéral	Verchères	1944	1st term
George Carlyle Marler	Libéral	Westmount–Saint-Georges	1942	2nd term
Henri Vachon	Union Nationale	Wolfe	1936, 1944	2nd term*
Antonio Élie	Union Nationale	Yamaska	1931	5th term

== Other elected MLAs ==
Other MLAs were elected in by-elections during this term

- Georges-Octave Poulin, Union Nationale, Beauce, November 21, 1945
- Charles Daniel French, Union Nationale, Compton, July 3, 1946
- Daniel Johnson, Union Nationale, Bagot, December 18, 1946
- John Gillies Rennie, Union Nationale, Huntingdon, July 23, 1947

== Cabinet Ministers ==
- Prime Minister and Executive Council President: Maurice Duplessis
- Agriculture: Laurent Barrée
- Colonization: Joseph-Damase Begin
- Labour: Antonio Barrette
- Public Works: Roméo Lorrain
- Health and Social Welfare: Albiny Paquette (1944-1946)
  - Social Welfare and Youth: Paul Sauvé (1946-1948)
  - Health: Albiny Paquette (1947-1948)
- Lands and Forests: John Samuel Bourque
- Hunting and Coastal Fisheries: Camille-Eugène Pouliot
- Mines: Jonathan Robinson
- Hydraulic resources: John Samuel Bourque (1945-1948)
- Roads: Antonio Talbot
- Municipal Affairs: Bona Dussault
- Industry and Commerce: Jean-Paul Beaulieu
- Attorney General: Maurice Duplessis
- Provincial Secretary: Omer Côté
- Treasurer: Onésime Gagnon
- Members without portfolios: Thomas Chapais, Antonio Élie, Tancrède Labbé, Marc Trudel, Patrice Tardif, Joseph-Hormisdas Delisle, Joseph-Théophile Larochelle

== New electoral districts ==
The electoral map was slightly modified in 1945 as the Charlevoix et Saguenay riding was split into two new ridings: Charlevoix and Saguenay. The change was effective in the 1948 elections.
