= 23rd Quebec Legislature =

The 23rd Legislative Assembly of Quebec was the provincial legislature of Quebec, Canada that existed from July 28, 1948, to July 16, 1952. The governing party was the Union Nationale, led by Maurice Duplessis which held power for a second consecutive mandate since 1944.

== Seats per political party ==
- After the 1948 elections

Affiliation	Members
Union Nationale	82
Liberal	8
Independent	2
Total	92
Government Majority	74

== Member list ==
This was the list of members of the Legislative Assembly of Quebec that were elected in the 1948 election:

Name	Party	Riding	First elected / previously elected	No. of terms
Jacques Miquelon	Union Nationale	Abitibi-Est	1948	1st term
Émile Lesage	Union Nationale	Abitibi-Ouest	1936, 1944	3rd term*
William McOuat Cottingham	Union Nationale	Argenteuil	1948	1st term
Wilfrid Labbé	Union Nationale	Arthabaska	1948	1st term
Daniel Johnson	Union Nationale	Bagot	1946	2nd term
Georges-Octave Poulin	Union Nationale	Beauce	1945	2nd term
Edgar Hébert	Union Nationale	Beauharnois	1948	1st term
Paul-Eugène Bélanger	Union Nationale	Bellechasse	1948	1st term
Azellus Lavallée	Union Nationale	Berthier	1948	1st term
Henri Jolicoeur	Union Nationale	Bonaventure	1936, 1944	3rd term*
Jonathan Robinson	Union Nationale	Brome	1936	4th term
Charles James Warwick Fox (1948)	Union Nationale	Brome	1948	1st term
John Redmond Roche	Union Nationale	Chambly	1948	1st term
Maurice Bellemare	Union Nationale	Champlain	1944	2nd term
Arthur Leclerc	Union Nationale	Charlevoix	1936, 1944	3rd term*
Arthur Laberge	Union Nationale	Châteauguay	1948	1st term
Antonio Talbot	Union Nationale	Chicoutimi	1938	4th term
Charles Daniel French	Union Nationale	Compton	1946	2nd term
Paul Sauvé	Union Nationale	Deux-Montagnes	1930, 1936	6th term*
Joseph-Damase Bégin	Union Nationale	Dorchester	1935	5th term
Robert Bernard	Union Nationale	Drummond	1944	2nd term
Patrice Tardif	Union Nationale	Frontenac	1935, 1944	4th term*
Robert Lévesque	Libéral	Gaspé-Nord	1948	1st term
Camille-Eugène Pouliot	Union Nationale	Gaspé-Sud	1936	4th term
Gérard Desjardins	Union Nationale	Gatineau	1948	1st term
Alexandre Taché	Union Nationale	Hull	1936, 1944	3rd term*
John Gillies Rennie	Union Nationale	Huntingdon	1947	2nd term
Yvon Thuot	Union Nationale	Iberville	1944	2nd term
Hormisdas Langlais	Union Nationale	Îles-de-la-Madeleine	1936	4th term
Charles-Aimé Kirkland	Libéral	Jacques-Cartier	1939	3rd term
Antonio Barrette	Union Nationale	Joliette	1936	4th term
Alfred Plourde	Union Nationale	Kamouraska	1948	1st term
Albiny Paquette	Union Nationale	Labelle	1935	5th term
Antonio Auger	Union Nationale	Lac-Saint-Jean	1948	1st term
Victor-Stanislas Chartrand	Union Nationale	L'Assomption	1944	2nd term
Omer Barrière	Union Nationale	Laval	1948	1st term
Charles Romulus Ducharme	Union Nationale	Laviolette	1935, 1944	4th term*
Joseph-Théophile Larochelle	Union Nationale	Lévis	1935, 1944	4th term*
Joseph-Albert Samson (1949)	Union Nationale	Lévis	1949	1st term
Fernand Lizotte	Union Nationale	L'Islet	1948	1st term
René Bernatchez	Union Nationale	Lotbinière	1948	1st term
Albert Gatien	Union Nationale	Maisonneuve	1944	2nd term
Germain Caron	Union Nationale	Maskinongé	1944	2nd term
Onésime Gagnon	Union Nationale	Matane	1936	4th term
Philippe Cossette	Union Nationale	Matapédia	1944	2nd term
Tancrède Labbé	Union Nationale	Mégantic	1935, 1940	5th term*
Jean-Jacques Bertrand	Union Nationale	Missisquoi	1948	1st term
Maurice Tellier	Union Nationale	Montcalm	1936, 1944	3rd term*
Antoine Rivard	Union Nationale	Montmagny	1948	1st term
Yves Prévost	Union Nationale	Montmorency	1948	1st term
Georges Guévremont	Union Nationale	Montréal–Jeanne-Mance	1948	1st term
Paul Provençal	Union Nationale	Montréal-Laurier	1948	1st term
Gérard Thibeault	Union Nationale	Montréal-Mercier	1936, 1948	2nd term*
Paul Earl	Libéral	Montréal–Notre-Dame-de-Grâce	1948	1st term
Henri Groulx	Libéral	Montréal-Outremont	1939	3rd term
Francis Hanley	Independent	Montréal–Sainte-Anne	1948	1st term
Aimé Gendron	Union Nationale	Montréal–Sainte-Marie	1948	1st term
Joseph-Hormisdas Delisle	Union Nationale	Montréal–Saint-Henri	1944	2nd term
Omer Côté	Union Nationale	Montréal–Saint-Jacques	1944	2nd term
Dave Rochon	Libéral	Montréal–Saint-Louis	1948	1st term
Lionel-Alfred Ross	Libéral	Montréal-Verdun	1944	2nd term
Hercule Riendeau	Union Nationale	Napierville-Laprairie	1944	2nd term
Émery Fleury	Union Nationale	Nicolet	1936, 1944	3rd term*
Roméo Lorrain	Union Nationale	Papineau	1935	5th term
Raymond Thomas Johnston	Union Nationale	Pontiac	1948	1st term
Bona Dussault	Union Nationale	Portneuf	1935, 1944	4th term*
Gérard Guay	Union Nationale	Québec-Centre	1948	1st term
René Chaloult	Independent (Note: First elected as a Union Nationale candidate)	Québec-Comté	1936	4th term
Joseph-Onésime Matte	Union Nationale	Québec-Est	1948	1st term
Jean-Alphonse Saucier	Union Nationale	Québec-Ouest	1948	1st term
Bernard Gagné	Union Nationale	Richelieu	1948	1st term
Albert Goudreau	Union Nationale	Richmond	1935, 1944	4th term*
Alfred Dubé	Union Nationale	Rimouski	1936, 1944	3rd term*
Roméo Gagné	Union Nationale	Rivière-du-Loup	1948	1st term
Antoine Marcotte	Union Nationale	Roberval	1944	2nd term
Laurent Barré	Union Nationale	Rouville	1931, 1944	5th term*
Guy Dallaire	Union Nationale	Rouyn-Noranda	1948	1st term
Pierre Ouellet	Union Nationale	Saguenay	1948	1st term
Ernest-Joseph Chartier	Union Nationale	Saint-Hyacinthe	1944	2nd term
Jean-Paul Beaulieu	Union Nationale	Saint-Jean	1941	3rd term
Marc Trudel	Union Nationale	Saint-Maurice	1935, 1944	4th term*
Francis Boudreau	Union Nationale	Saint-Sauveur	1948	1st term
Hector Choquette	Union Nationale	Shefford	1935, 1944	4th term*
John Samuel Bourque	Union Nationale	Sherbrooke	1935	5th term
Léon-Denis Gérin	Union Nationale	Stanstead	1948	1st term
Nil-Élie Larivière	Union Nationale	Témiscamingue	1935, 1944	4th term*
André Pelletier	Union Nationale	Témiscouata	1944	2nd term
Joseph-Léonard Blanchard	Union Nationale	Terrebonne	1944	2nd term
Maurice Duplessis	Union Nationale	Trois-Rivières	1927	7th term
Joseph-Édouard Jeannotte	Union Nationale	Vaudreuil-Soulanges	1948	1st term
Arthur Dupré	Libéral	Verchères	1944	2nd term
George Carlyle Marler	Libéral	Westmount–Saint-Georges	1942	3rd term
Henri Vachon	Union Nationale	Wolfe	1936, 1944	3rd term*
Antonio Élie	Union Nationale	Yamaska	1931	6th term

== Other elected MLAs ==
Other MLAs were elected in by-elections during the term

- Charles James Warwick Fox, Union Nationale, Brome, December 7, 1948
- Albert Samson, Union Nationale, Lévis, February 16, 1949

== Cabinet Ministers ==
- Prime Minister and Executive Council President: Maurice Duplessis
- Agriculture: Laurent Barrée
- Colonization: Joseph-Damase Begin
- Labour: Antonio Barrette
- Public Works: Roméo Lorrain
- Social Welfare and Youth: Paul Sauvé
- Health: Albiny Paquette
- Lands and Forests: John Samuel Bourque
- Hunting and Coastal Fisheries: Camille-Eugène Pouliot
- Mines: Jonathan Robinson (1948), Charles Daniel French (1948–1952)
- Hydraulic resources: John Samuel Bourque
- Roads: Antonio Talbot
- Municipal Affairs: Bona Dussault
- Industry and Commerce: Jean-Paul Beaulieu
- Attorney General: Maurice Duplessis
- Provincial Secretary: Omer Côté
- Solicitor General: Antoine Rivard (1950–1952)
- Treasurer: Onésime Gagnon (1948–1951)
  - Finances: Onesime Gagnon (1951–1952)
- State Ministers: Antoine Rivard (1948–1950)
