= 25th Quebec Legislature =

The 25th Legislative Assembly of Quebec was the Quebec, Canada, provincial political legislature that existed from June 20, 1956, and June 22, 1960. The Union Nationale was the governing party for the fourth consecutive mandate. It was also Maurice Duplessis last term as Premier of Quebec. He died in office in 1959 and was succeeded in less than a year by Paul Sauvé and former cabinet Minister Antonio Barrette after Sauvé died less than four months after being sworn as Premier.

== Seats per political party ==
- After the 1956 elections

| Affiliation | Members |
|---|---|
| Union Nationale | 72 |
| Liberal | 20 |
| Independent | 1 |
| Total | 93 |
| Government Majority | 52 |

== Member list ==
This was the list of members of the Legislative Assembly of Quebec that were elected in the 1956 election:

| Name | Party | Riding | First elected / previously elected | No. of terms |
|---|---|---|---|---|
| Jacques Miquelon | Union Nationale | Abitibi-Est | 1948 | 3rd term |
| Alcide Courcy | Libéral | Abitibi-Ouest | 1956 | 1st term |
| William McOuat Cottingham | Union Nationale | Argenteuil | 1948 | 3rd term |
| Wilfrid Labbé | Union Nationale | Arthabaska | 1948 | 3rd term |
| Daniel Johnson | Union Nationale | Bagot | 1946 | 4th term |
| Georges-Octave Poulin | Union Nationale | Beauce | 1945 | 4th term |
| Edgar Hébert | Union Nationale | Beauharnois | 1948 | 3rd term |
| Alphée Poirier | Union Nationale | Bellechasse | 1952 | 2nd term |
| Azellus Lavallée | Union Nationale | Berthier | 1948 | 3rd term |
| Gérard D. Levesque | Libéral | Bonaventure | 1956 | 1st term |
| Glendon Brown | Libéral | Brome | 1956 | 1st term |
| Robert Théberge | Libéral | Chambly | 1956 | 1st term |
| Maurice Bellemare | Union Nationale | Champlain | 1944 | 4th term |
| Arthur Leclerc | Union Nationale | Charlevoix | 1936, 1944 | 5th term* |
| Arthur Laberge | Union Nationale | Châteauguay | 1948 | 3rd term |
| Joseph-Maurice Laberge (1957) | Union Nationale | Châteauguay | 1957 | 1st term |
| Antonio Talbot | Union Nationale | Chicoutimi | 1938 | 6th term |
| Fabien Gagnon | Libéral | Compton | 1956 | 1st term |
| Claude-Gilles Gosselin (1957) | Union Nationale | Compton | 1957 | 1st term |
| Paul Sauvé | Union Nationale | Deux-Montagnes | 1930, 1936 | 8th term* |
| Joseph-Damase Bégin | Union Nationale | Dorchester | 1935 | 7th term |
| Robert Bernard | Union Nationale | Drummond | 1944, 1956 | 3rd term* |
| Éloi Guillemette | Union Nationale | Frontenac | 1956 | 1st term |
| Alphonse Couturier | Union Nationale | Gaspé-Nord | 1952 | 2nd term |
| Camille-Eugène Pouliot | Union Nationale | Gaspé-Sud | 1936 | 6th term |
| Gérard Desjardins | Union Nationale | Gatineau | 1948 | 3rd term |
| Oswald Parent | Libéral | Hull | 1956 | 1st term |
| Henry Somerville | Union Nationale | Huntingdon | 1952 | 2nd term |
| Yvon Thuot | Union Nationale | Iberville | 1944 | 4th term |
| Hormisdas Langlais | Union Nationale | Îles-de-la-Madeleine | 1936 | 6th term |
| Charles-Aimé Kirkland | Libéral | Jacques-Cartier | 1939 | 5th term |
| Antonio Barrette | Union Nationale | Joliette | 1936 | 6th term |
| Léonce Ouellet | Union Nationale | Jonquière-Kénogami | 1956 | 1st term |
| Alfred Plourde | Union Nationale | Kamouraska | 1948 | 3rd term |
| Albiny Paquette | Union Nationale | Labelle | 1935 | 7th term |
| Pierre Bohémier (1958) | Union Nationale | Labelle | 1958 | 1st term |
| Fernand Lafontaine (1959) | Union Nationale | Labelle | 1959 | 1st term |
| Antonio Auger | Union Nationale | Lac-Saint-Jean | 1948 | 3rd term |
| Jean-Paul Levasseur (1959) | Union Nationale | Lac-Saint-Jean | 1959 | 1st term |
| Victor-Stanislas Chartrand | Union Nationale | L'Assomption | 1944 | 4th term |
| Léopold Pouliot | Union Nationale | Laval | 1956 | 1st term |
| Charles Romulus Ducharme | Union Nationale | Laviolette | 1935, 1944 | 6th term* |
| Albert Samson | Union Nationale | Lévis | 1949, 1956 | 2nd term* |
| Fernand Lizotte | Union Nationale | L'Islet | 1948 | 3rd term |
| René Bernatchez | Union Nationale | Lotbinière | 1948 | 3rd term |
| Lucien Tremblay | Union Nationale | Maisonneuve | 1956 | 1st term |
| Germain Caron | Union Nationale | Maskinongé | 1944 | 4th term |
| Onésime Gagnon | Union Nationale | Matane | 1936 | 6th term |
| Benoît Gaboury (1958) | Union Nationale | Matane | 1958 | 1st term |
| J-Clovis Gagnon | Union Nationale | Matapédia | 1953 | 2nd term |
| Tancrède Labbé | Union Nationale | Mégantic | 1935, 1940 | 7th term* |
| Joseph-Émile Fortin (1957) | Union Nationale | Mégantic | 1957 | 1st term |
| Jean-Jacques Bertrand | Union Nationale | Missisquoi | 1948 | 3rd term |
| Maurice Tellier | Union Nationale | Montcalm | 1936, 1944 | 5th term* |
| Antoine Rivard | Union Nationale | Montmagny | 1948 | 3rd term |
| Yves Prévost | Union Nationale | Montmorency | 1948 | 3rd term |
| Maurice-Tréflé Custeau | Union Nationale | Montréal–Jeanne-Mance | 1956 | 1st term |
| Arsène Gagné | Union Nationale | Montréal-Laurier | 1955 | 2nd term |
| Gérard Thibeault | Union Nationale | Montréal-Mercier | 1936, 1948 | 4th term* |
| Paul Earl | Libéral | Montréal–Notre-Dame-de-Grâce | 1948 | 3rd term |
| Georges-Émile Lapalme | Libéral | Montréal-Outremont | 1953 | 2nd term |
| Francis Hanley | Independent | Montréal–Sainte-Anne | 1948 | 3rd term |
| Edgar Charbonneau | Union Nationale | Montréal–Sainte-Marie | 1956 | 1st term |
| Philippe Lalonde | Libéral | Montréal–Saint-Henri | 1952 | 2nd term |
| Paul Dozois | Union Nationale | Montréal–Saint-Jacques | 1956 | 1st term |
| Dave Rochon | Libéral | Montréal–Saint-Louis | 1948 | 3rd term |
| Dave Rochon | Independent | Montréal–Saint-Louis | 1948 | 3rd term |
| Lionel-Alfred Ross | Libéral | Montréal-Verdun | 1944 | 4th term |
| Lionel-Alfred Ross | Independent | Montréal-Verdun | 1944 | 4th term |
| Hercule Riendeau | Union Nationale | Napierville-Laprairie | 1944 | 4th term |
| Camille Roy | Union Nationale | Nicolet | 1952 | 2nd term |
| Roméo Lorrain | Union Nationale | Papineau | 1935 | 7th term |
| Raymond Thomas Johnston | Union Nationale | Pontiac | 1948 | 3rd term |
| Rosaire Chalifour | Union Nationale | Portneuf | 1953 | 2nd term |
| Maurice Cloutier | Union Nationale | Québec-Centre | 1952 | 2nd term |
| Émilien Rochette | Union Nationale | Québec-Comté | 1956 | 1st term |
| Armand Maltais | Union Nationale | Québec-Est | 1956 | 1st term |
| Jean-Paul Galipeault | Libéral | Québec-Ouest | 1956 | 1st term |
| Bernard Gagné | Union Nationale | Richelieu | 1948, 1956 | 2nd term* |
| Émilien Lafrance | Libéral | Richmond | 1952 | 2nd term |
| Albert Dionne | Libéral | Rimouski | 1956 | 1st term |
| Alphonse Couturier | Libéral | Rivière-du-Loup | 1956 | 1st term |
| Paul-Henri Spence | Union Nationale | Roberval | 1956 | 1st term |
| Jean-Joseph Turcotte (1958) | Union Nationale | Roberval | 1958 | 1st term |
| Laurent Barré | Union Nationale | Rouville | 1931, 1944 | 7th term* |
| Edgar Turpin | Libéral | Rouyn-Noranda | 1956 | 1st term |
| Pierre Ouellet | Union Nationale | Saguenay | 1948 | 3rd term |
| René Saint-Pierre | Libéral | Saint-Hyacinthe | 1956 | 1st term |
| Jean-Paul Beaulieu | Union Nationale | Saint-Jean | 1941 | 5th term |
| René Hamel | Libéral | Saint-Maurice | 1952 | 2nd term |
| Francis Boudreau | Union Nationale | Saint-Sauveur | 1948 | 3rd term |
| Armand Russell | Union Nationale | Shefford | 1956 | 1st term |
| John Samuel Bourque | Union Nationale | Sherbrooke | 1935 | 7th term |
| Léon-Denis Gérin | Union Nationale | Stanstead | 1948 | 3rd term |
| Joseph-André Larouche | Union Nationale | Témiscamingue | 1956 | 1st term |
| Antoine Raymond | Union Nationale | Témiscouata | 1952 | 2nd term |
| Joseph-Léonard Blanchard | Union Nationale | Terrebonne | 1944 | 4th term |
| Maurice Duplessis | Union Nationale | Trois-Rivières | 1927 | 9th term |
| Joseph-Édouard Jeannotte | Union Nationale | Vaudreuil-Soulanges | 1948 | 3rd term |
| Loyola Schmidt (1957) | Union Nationale | Vaudreuil-Soulanges | 1957 | 1st term |
| Clodomir Ladouceur | Union Nationale | Verchères | 1956 | 1st term |
| John Richard Hyde | Libéral | Westmount–Saint-Georges | 1955 | 2nd term |
| Henri Vachon | Union Nationale | Wolfe | 1936, 1944, 1956 | 4th term* |
| Antonio Élie | Union Nationale | Yamaska | 1931 | 8th term |

== Other elected MLAs ==
Other MLAs were elected in by-elections during this mandate

- Joseph-Maurice Laberge, Union Nationale, Chateauguay, September 18, 1957
- Claude-Gilles Gosselin, Union Nationale, Compton, September 18, 1957
- Joseph-Émile Fortin, Union Nationale, Mégantic, September 18, 1957
- Loyola Schmidt, Union Nationale, Vaudreuil-Soulanges, September 18, 1957
- Benoît Gaboury, Union Nationale, Matane, July 2, 1958
- Pierre Bohémier, Union Nationale, Labelle, October 15, 1958
- Jean-Joseph Turcotte, Union Nationale, Roberval, October 15, 1958
- Fernand Lafontaine, Union Nationale, Labelle, September 16, 1959
- Jean-Paul Levasseur, Union Nationale, Lac-Saint-Jean, September 16, 1959

== Cabinet Ministers ==
=== Duplessis Cabinet (1956-1959) ===
- Prime Minister and Executive Council President: Maurice Duplessis
- Agriculture: Laurent Barrée
- Colonization: Joseph-Damase Begin
- Labour: Antonio Barrette
- Public Works: Roméo Lorrain
- Social Welfare and Youth: Paul Sauvé
- Health: Albiny Paquette (1956–1958), Arthur Leclerc (1958–1959)
- Lands and Forests: John Samuel Bourque (1956–1958), Jean-Jacques Bertrand (1958–1959)
- Hunting and Coastal Fisheries: Camille-Eugène Pouliot (1956–1958)
  - Fisheries and Hunting: Camille-Eugene Pouliot (1958–1959)
- Mines: William McOuat Cottingham
- Hydraulic resources: John Samuel Bourque (1956–1958), Daniel Johnson Sr. (1958–1959)
- Roads: Antonio Talbot
- Transportation and Communications: Antoine Rivard
- Municipal Affairs: Yves Prevost (1956), Paul Dozois (1956–1959)
- Industry and Commerce: Jean-Paul Beaulieu
- Attorney General: Maurice Duplessis
- Provincial Secretary: Romeo Lorrain (1956), Yves Prevost (1956–1959)
- Solicitor General: Antoine Rivard
- Finances: Onésime Gagnon (1956), John Samuel Bourque (1958–1959)
- State Ministers: Gerard Thibeault (1958–1959)

=== Sauve Cabinet (1959-1960) ===
- Prime Minister and Executive Council President: Paul Sauve
- Agriculture: Laurent Barrée
- Colonization: Joseph-Damase Begin
- Labour: Antonio Barrette
- Public Works: Roméo Lorrain
- Social Welfare and Youth: Paul Sauvé
- Health: Arthur Leclerc
- Lands and Forests: Jean-Jacques Bertrand
- Fisheries and Hunting: Camille-Eugène Pouliot
- Mines: William McOuat Cottingham
- Hydraulic resources: Daniel Johnson Sr.
- Roads: Antonio Talbot
- Transportation and Communications: Antoine Rivard
- Municipal Affairs: Paul Dozois
- Industry and Commerce: Jean-Paul Beaulieu
- Attorney General: Antoine Rivard
- Provincial Secretary: Yves Prevost
- Solicitor General: Jacques Miquelon (1959–1960)
- Finances: John Samuel Bourque
- State Ministers: Gerard Thibeault, Antonio Elie, Maurice Bellemare, Wilfrid Labbe, Robert Bernard, Jacques Miquelon (1959)

=== Barrette Cabinet (1960) ===
- Prime Minister and Executive Council President: Antonio Barrette
- Agriculture: Laurent Barrée
- Colonization: Joseph-Damase Begin
- Labour: Antonio Barrette
- Public Works: Roméo Lorrain
- Social Welfare and Youth: Jean-Jacques Bertrand
- Health: Arthur Leclerc
- Lands and Forests: Jacques Miquelon
- Fisheries and Hunting: Camille-Eugène Pouliot
- Mines: William McOuat Cottingham
- Hydraulic resources: Daniel Johnson Sr.
- Roads: Antonio Talbot
- Transportation and Communications: Antoine Rivard
- Municipal Affairs: Paul Dozois
- Industry and Commerce: Jean-Paul Beaulieu
- Attorney General: Antoine Rivard
- Provincial Secretary: Yves Prévost
- Solicitor General: Jacques Miquelon
- Finances: John Samuel Bourque
- State Ministers: Gerard Thibeault, Antonio Élie, Maurice Bellemare, Wilfrid Labbe, Robert Bernard, Maurice-Tréfflé Custeau, Armand Maltais

== New electoral districts ==
The electoral map was slightly modified in 1960 with the creation of the Duplessis riding from parts of Saguenay just before the elections later that year. In addition, Bourget was created from parts of Laval.
