= Paul Gérin-Lajoie =

Canadian politician

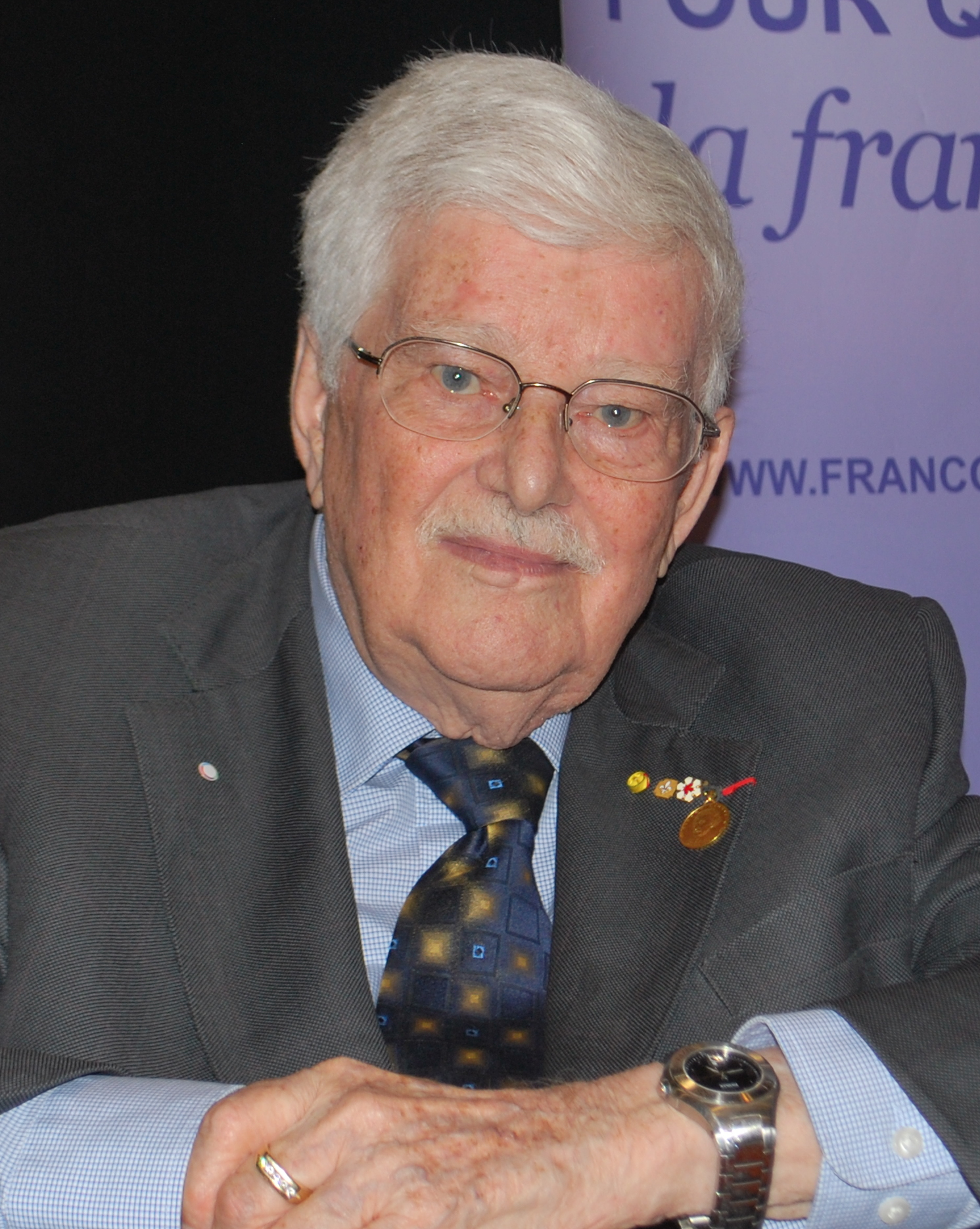

Deputy Premier of Quebec
- In office 1964–1966
- Premier: Jean Lesage
- Preceded by: Georges-Emile Lapalme
- Succeeded by: Jean-Jacques Bertrand

MNA for Vaudreuil-Soulanges
- In office 1960–1969
- Preceded by: Loyola Schmidt
- Succeeded by: François-Edouard Belliveau

Personal details
- Born: February 23, 1920 Montreal, Quebec, Canada
- Died: June 25, 2018 (aged 98)
- Party: Liberal
- Relations: Marie Lacoste Gérin-Lajoie (grandmother)
- Cabinet: Minister of Youth (1960–1964); Minister of Education (1964–1966)

Paul Gérin-Lajoie, CC GOQ QC (French pronunciation: [pol ʒeʁɛ̃ laʒwa]; February 23, 1920 – June 25, 2018) was a Canadian lawyer, philanthropist, and a former member of the National Assembly of Quebec and Cabinet Minister.

== Early life ==
Born in Montreal, Quebec, the son of Henri Gérin-Lajoie and Pauline Dorion, he studied at Collège Jean-de-Brébeuf, where he was editor of the school paper, the Université de Montréal, and Oxford University as a Rhodes Scholar, where he received a Doctor of Laws degree. He was admitted to the Bar of Quebec in 1943.

== Career ==
He ran unsuccessfully as a Liberal candidate in the riding of Vaudreuil-Soulanges in the 1956 general election and in a 1957 by-election. In 1958, he came in second at the Quebec Liberal Party leadership convention.

He was elected in Vaudreuil-Soulanges in the 1960 election and was re-elected in 1962 and 1966. From 1960 to 1964 he was the Minister of Youth in the cabinet of Jean Lesage (eventually serving as vice-premier) and in 1964 became the first person since 1875 to be appointed Minister of Education, serving in that position until 1966. As Minister of Education he was the driving force behind major changes made to Quebec's education system. He did not run for re-election in 1970.

Gérin-Lajoie was president of the Canadian International Development Agency from 1970 to 1977.

He founded the Paul Gérin-Lajoie Foundation, in 1977, an organization that has contributed to the basic education of children in the poorest countries in addition to raising awareness of these countries among primary school children in Canada.

== Honours ==
In 1966, he received an honorary doctorate from Sir George Williams University, which later became Concordia University. In 1979, he was made a Companion of the Order of Canada "in recognition of his distinguished services to his country, chiefly as president of the Canadian International Development Agency from 1970 to 1977, and as deputy premier and minister of education of the Government of Québec from 1960 to 1966". In 1987, he was made an Officer of the National Order of Quebec and was promoted to Grand Officer in 1998. In 2002, he was made a Knight of the Order of the Legion of Honour by the Government of France. A high school is named in his honour, called École Secondaire Paul-Gérin-Lajoie-d’Outremont; located in the borough of Outremont, Montreal.

== Electoral record ==
1966 Quebec general election: Vaudreuil-Soulanges
Party	Candidate	Votes	%
Liberal	Paul Gérin-Lajoie	11,120	53.17
Union Nationale	Aimé Grandmaison	8,490	40.60
Independent	Jean-Paul Laflèche	713	3.41
RIN	Louis Gravel	494	2.36
Ralliement national	Régent Millette	96	0.46
Total valid votes		20,913	100.00
Rejected and declined ballots		280	
Turnout		21,193	81.90
Electors on the lists		25,878	
