= Vaudreuil-Soulanges =

Vaudreuil-Soulanges may refer to:

- Vaudreuil-Soulanges Regional County Municipality, Quebec
- Vaudreuil—Soulanges (federal electoral district), a federal electoral district coterminal with the aforementioned Regional County Municipality
- Vaudreuil-Soulanges (provincial electoral district), a former provincial electoral district in Quebec
