= André Pelletier =

André Pelletier or may refer to:

- André Pelletier (Quebec MLA) (1898–1952), member of the Legislative Assembly of Quebec for Témiscouata
- André Pelletier (MNA) (born 1941), member of the National Assembly of Quebec for Abitibi-Est
- André Pelletier (historian) (born 1937), French scholar of Roman history

== See also ==
- Andrée Pelletier, Canadian actress
