= Alphonse Couturier =

Alphonse Couturier may refer to:

- Alphonse Couturier (Union Nationale politician) (1885–1973), a Union Nationale member of the Legislative Assembly of Quebec for Gaspé Nord
- Alphonse Couturier (Liberal politician) (1902–1995), a Liberal member of the Legislative Assembly of Quebec for Rivière-du-Loup
