= Communist eggs scandal =

1956 scandal in Quebec, Canada

Propaganda published in the newspaper L'Action catholique (1956)

The communist eggs scandal was a scandal in Quebec during the 1956 Quebec general election. The sitting Union Nationale attacked the federal government for importing 300,000 dozen eggs from communist Poland.

The incumbent Union Nationale, led by Maurice Duplessis, won re-election, defeating the Quebec Liberal Party, led by Georges-Émile Lapalme.

This was the fifth and final time (and the fourth in a row) that Duplessis led his party to a general election victory.

== Events ==
During the Quebec general election of 1956, Premier of Quebec and leader of the Union Nationale Maurice Duplessis was attacked by members of the federal Liberal party on his margarine policy - one of rural voters' main issues. Duplessis was accused of insufficiently regulating the sale of goods from Ontario.

Instead of defending itself on the margarine issue, the Union Nationale denounced the federal government for importing 300,000 dozen "communist eggs" from Poland, which was under the Iron Curtain. According to the Union Nationale, Quebeckers had unknowingly eaten communist eggs for five years due to negligence and collusion by the Liberal government, and this importation of eggs from Poland created unjust competition for Quebecker farmers. The Union Nationale also attacked the provincial Liberals' agricultural policy, which they associated with the federal Liberals' policy.

Jean Lesage, then a federal liberal deputy, explained on 12 June 1956 that a private company, and not the federal government, had imported these eggs. By then, however, the Union Nationale had already published a large volume of propaganda and pamphlets on the communist eggs. The communist eggs scandal provided challenging to confront for Georges-Émile Lapalme and other liberals because of the novelty and unlikelihood of the attacks.

The communist egg scandal was almost the only reference to communism during the 1956 election.
