= Antoine Rivard =

Canadian politician

Member of the Legislative Assembly of Quebec for Montmagny
- In office 1948–1960
- Preceded by: Fernand Choquette
- Succeeded by: Laurent Lizotte

Personal details
- Born: November 14, 1898 Quebec City, Quebec
- Died: December 26, 1985 (aged 87) Quebec City, Quebec
- Party: Union Nationale

Antoine Rivard (November 14, 1898 – December 26, 1985) was a French Canadian politician.

== Background ==
He was born in Quebec City on November 14, 1898. He was an attorney and a professor. He was on active military service during World War I and World War II.

== Member of the legislature ==
Rivard unsuccessfully ran as a Union Nationale candidate to the Legislative Assembly of Quebec in the district of Québec-Centre in 1944. He was elected in the riding of Montmagny in 1948. He was re-elected in 1952 and 1956.

== Cabinet Member ==
He was appointed to Premier Maurice Duplessis's Cabinet in 1948, serving as Minister without Portfolio, Solicitor General from 1950 to 1959 and Minister of Transportation and Communications from 1954 to 1960. Duplessis, who has often been accused of having authoritarian ways, is believed to have once told Rivard in public, "Toé, tais-toé!" (You hush!)

Rivard lost re-election by a margin of nine votes in 1960.

== Death ==
He died on December 26, 1985.
