= John William French =

Canadian politician

Member of the Legislative Assembly of Quebec for Compton
- In office 1954–1956
- Preceded by: Charles Daniel French
- Succeeded by: Fabien Gagnon

Personal details
- Born: October 22, 1888 Scotstown, Quebec
- Died: November 8, 1970 (aged 82) Cookshire, Quebec
- Party: Union Nationale
- Relations: Charles Daniel French, brother

John William French (October 22, 1888 – November 8, 1970) was a Canadian politician and a Member of the Legislative Assembly of Quebec.

== Background ==
He was born in Scotstown, Eastern Townships on October 22, 1888 and married Dorothy Isabella MacLeod in the state of New York in 1935. He was the brother and political successor of Charles Daniel French.

== Local Politics ==
French served as a city councillor from 1925 to 1935 and as a school board member from 1935 to 1940 in Cookshire, Quebec.

== Member of the legislature ==
His brother Charles, who was the Member of the Legislative Assembly (MLA) for the provincial district of Compton died in 1954. A by-election was called to fill the vacancy and French successfully ran as a Union Nationale candidate to take over his brother's function. French was defeated by Liberal candidate Fabien Gagnon in the 1956 election.

== Death ==
He died on November 8, 1970.
