= Joseph-Achille Francoeur =

Canadian politician (1882–1959)

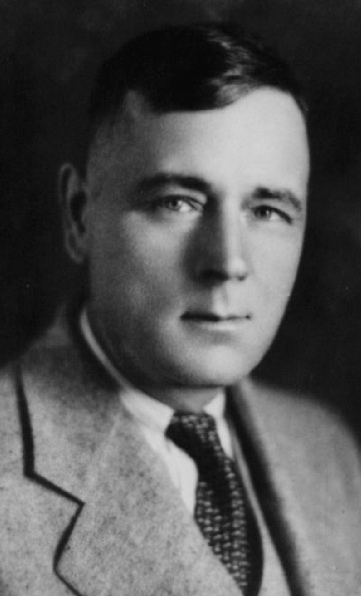

Member of the Legislative Assembly of Quebec for Montréal-Dorion
- In office 1931–1935
- Preceded by: Aldéric Blain
- Succeeded by: Grégoire Bélanger

Member of the Legislative Assembly of Quebec for Montréal-Mercier
- In office 1939–1948
- Preceded by: Gérard Thibeault
- Succeeded by: Gérard Thibeault

Personal details
- Born: August 28, 1882 Cap-Saint-Ignace, Quebec
- Died: January 21, 1959 (aged 76) Montreal, Quebec
- Resting place: Notre Dame des Neiges Cemetery
- Party: Liberal
- Relations: Joseph-Napoléon Francoeur, brother
- Cabinet: Minister without Portfolio (1944-1948)

Joseph-Achille Francoeur (August 28, 1882 – January 21, 1959) was a plumber and political figure in Quebec. He represented Montréal-Dorion from 1931 to 1935 and Montréal-Mercier from 1939 to 1948 in the Legislative Assembly of Quebec as a Liberal.

Francoeur was born in Cap-Saint-Ignace, Quebec, the son of Auguste Francoeur and Avila Caron, and was educated there. He apprenticed in Rivière-du-Loup and Quebec City and established a heating system business in Montreal. He invented a hot water furnace. In 1913, he married Léonie Bienvenue Francoeur. Francoeur ran unsuccessfully for a seat in the Quebec assembly in 1927. He was elected in 1931, but was defeated by Grégoire Bélanger when he ran for reelection in 1935 and 1936. He was elected in 1939 and re-elected in 1944. He served as a whip for the Liberal party and was a minister without portfolio in the Quebec cabinet in 1944. Francoeur was defeated when he ran for reelection in 1948.

Francoeur was a sergeant in the reserve during World War II. He also served as governor for the Hôpital Notre-Dame and the Hôpital Saint-Joseph in Montreal. He died in Montreal at the age of 76 and was buried in the Notre Dame des Neiges Cemetery.

His brother Joseph-Napoléon served in the Quebec assembly and the Canadian House of Commons.
