= Pierre Bohémier =

Canadian politician (1907–1959)

Member of the Legislative Assembly of Quebec for Labelle
- In office 1958–1959
- Preceded by: Albiny Paquette
- Succeeded by: Fernand Lafontaine

Personal details
- Born: January 7, 1907 Ferme-Neuve, Quebec, Canada
- Died: March 7, 1959 (aged 52) Montreal, Quebec, Canada
- Party: Union Nationale

Pierre Bohémier (January 7, 1907 – March 7, 1959) was a Canadian politician and a Member of the Legislative Assembly of Quebec.

== Background ==
He was born on January 7, 1907, in Ferme-Neuve, Laurentides, Quebec.

== Mayor ==
Bohémier served as Mayor of Ferme-Neuve from 1944 to 1959.

== Member of the legislature ==
He ran as a Union Nationale candidate in a by-election held on October 15, 1958, in the provincial district of Labelle and won without opposition.

== Death ==
Bohémier died in office on March 7, 1959, in Montreal.
