= Omer Côté =

Canadian politician (1906–1999)

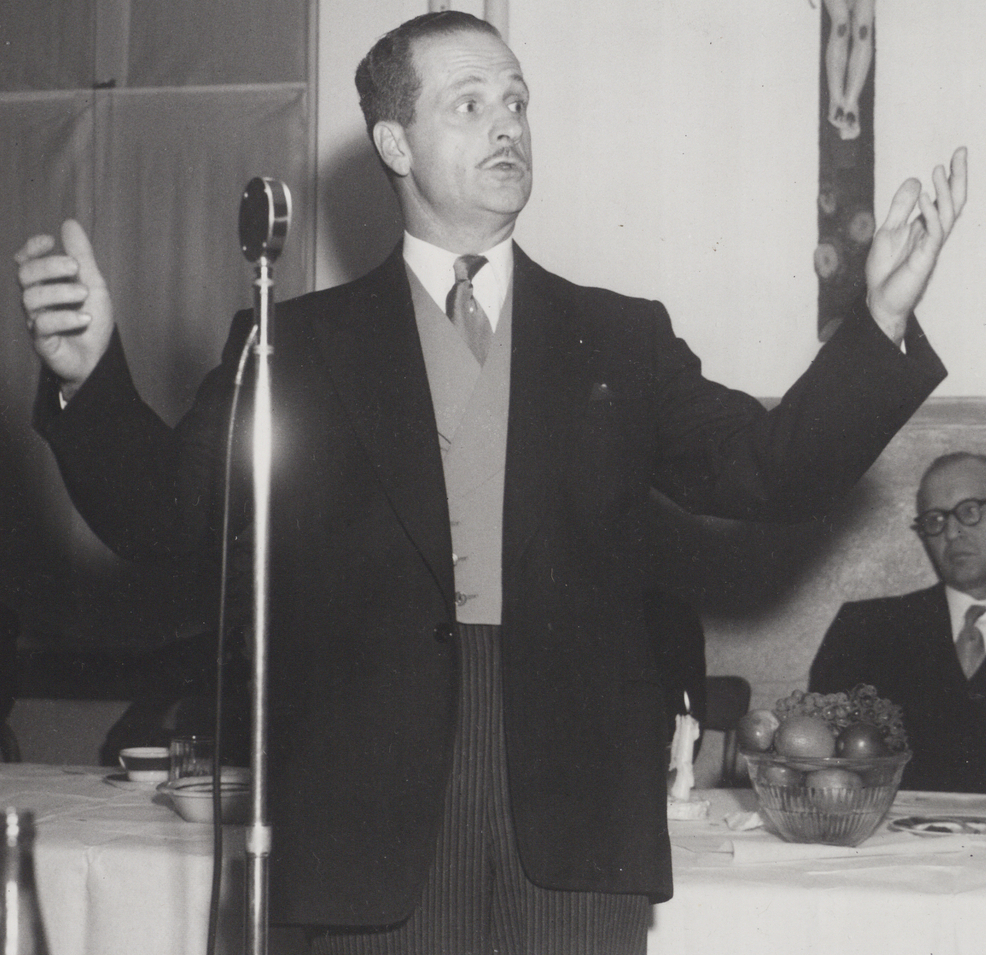

Member of the Legislative Assembly of Quebec for Montréal–Saint-Jacques
- In office 1944–1956
- Preceded by: Claude Jodoin
- Succeeded by: Paul Dozois

Personal details
- Born: 13 January 1906 Montreal, Quebec, Canada
- Died: 15 June 1999 (aged 93) Montreal, Quebec, Canada
- Resting place: Notre Dame des Neiges Cemetery
- Party: Union Nationale

Omer Côté (13 January 1906 – 15 June 1999) was a Canadian politician and a Member of the Legislative Assembly of Quebec.

== Political career ==
Born in Montreal, Quebec, Côté ran for a seat to the city council of Montreal in 1934 in the district of Ville-Marie, but was defeated by incumbent Tancrède Fortin. He ran again in 1936 and was successful against Fortin. Côté was re-elected in 1938 but did not run for re-election in 1940.

Côté ran unsuccessfully as a Union Nationale candidate in the 1942 by-election in the district of Montréal–Saint-Jacques. He was, however, successful in the Quebec general election in 1944 and was re-elected in 1948 and 1952. He also was appointed Minister in the Cabinet of Maurice Duplessis, serving as Province Secretary from 1944 to 1956.

Côté resigned his other posts in 1956 to become a judge, then left the bench in 1976 after reaching mandatory retirement age. After his death in 1999, he was entombed at the Notre Dame des Neiges Cemetery in Montreal.
