= André Pelletier (Témiscouata politician) =

Canadian politician

Member of the Legislative Assembly of Quebec for Témiscouata
- In office 1944–1952
- Preceded by: Joseph-Alphonse Beaulieu
- Succeeded by: Antoine Raymond

Personal details
- Born: 28 April 1898 Saint-Louis-du-Ha! Ha!, Quebec
- Died: 28 August 1952 (aged 54) Rivière-du-Loup, Quebec
- Party: Union Nationale

André Pelletier (28 April 1898 – 28 August 1952) was a Canadian politician and a two-term Member of the Legislative Assembly of Quebec.

== Background ==
He was born in Saint-Louis-du-Ha! Ha!, Bas-Saint-Laurent and became an insurance agent. He served as School Board President of Saint-Louis-du-Ha! Ha! from 1937 to 1944.

He ran as a Union Nationale candidate in the 1944 election in the provincial district of Témiscouata and won against Liberal incumbent Joseph-Alphonse Beaulieu. He was re-elected in the 1948 election, but he did not run for re-election in the 1952 election.

Pelletier died on August 28, 1952, in Rivière-du-Loup.
