= Charles Daniel French =

Canadian politician

Member of the Legislative Assembly of Quebec for Compton
- In office 1946–1954
- Preceded by: William James Duffy
- Succeeded by: John William French

Personal details
- Born: January 26, 1884 Scotstown, Quebec
- Died: May 3, 1954 (aged 70) Westmount, Quebec
- Party: Union Nationale
- Relations: John William French, brother

Charles Daniel French (January 26, 1884 – May 3, 1954) was a Canadian politician and a Member of the Legislative Assembly of Quebec.

== Background ==
He was born in Scotstown, Eastern Townships on January 26, 1884 and married Emily Christina Macaulay in 1914.

== Political career ==
French ran as a Union Nationale candidate in the provincial district of Compton in the 1939 election and was defeated by Liberal incumbent William James Duffy.

Following Duffy's death in 1946, a by-election was called. French successfully ran and became a Member of the Legislative Assembly (MLA). He was re-elected in the 1948 and 1952 elections.

He was appointed to Maurice Duplessis's Cabinet and served as Minister of Mining from 1948 until his death.

== Retirement ==
French died in office on May 3, 1954. He was succeeded by his brother John William French.
