= Victor-Stanislas Chartrand =

Canadian politician (1887–1966)

Member of the Legislative Assembly of Quebec for L'Assomption
- In office 1944–1961
- Preceded by: Bernard Bissonnette
- Succeeded by: Frédéric Coiteux

Personal details
- Born: March 12, 1887 Montreal, Quebec, Canada
- Died: February 11, 1966 (aged 78) L'Épiphanie, Quebec, Canada
- Party: Union Nationale

Victor-Stanislas Chartrand (March 12, 1887 – February 11, 1966) was a Canadian politician and a Member of the Legislative Assembly of Quebec.

== Background ==
He was born on March 12, 1887, in Montreal, Quebec.

== City politics ==
Chartrand served as Mayor of L'Épiphanie, Lanaudière from 1951 to 1957.

== Member of the provincial legislature ==
He unsuccessfully ran as a Union Nationale candidate to the Legislative Assembly of Quebec in the provincial district of L'Assomption in the 1939 election. He was elected in the 1944 election against Liberal incumbent Bernard Bissonnette. Chartrand was re-elected in the 1948, 1952, 1956 elections and, by a single ballot, the 1960 election. On July 13, 1961, a recount gave the 1960 election to Liberal candidate Frédéric Coiteux, with a majority of 10 ballots.

== Death ==
He died on February 11, 1966.
