= Alphonse Couturier (Union Nationale politician) =

Canadian politician

Member of the Legislative Assembly of Quebec for Gaspé-Nord
- In office 1952–1960
- Preceded by: Robert Lévesque
- Succeeded by: Claude Jourdain

Personal details
- Born: 12 February 1885 Sainte-Hélène, near Kamouraska, Quebec
- Died: 11 July 1973 (aged 88) Quebec City, Quebec
- Party: Union Nationale

Alphonse Couturier (French pronunciation: [alfɔ̃s kutyʁje]; 12 February 1885 – 11 July 1973) was a member of the Legislative Assembly of Quebec for the Union Nationale.

Couturier owned a sawmill in Saint-Louis-du-Ha! Ha!, Quebec from 1909 to 1936, and was mayor of that town from 1931 to 1936. He was mayor of Marsoui, Quebec from 1950 to 1960.

Couturier was first elected to the Legislative Assembly in the 1952 Quebec general election for the Union Nationale in the Gaspé-Nord electoral district. He was re-elected in 1956, but was defeated in 1960.
