= 1956 Quebec general election =

Canadian provincial election

- June 20, 1956

93 seats in the 24th Legislative Assembly of Quebec 47 seats were needed for a majority
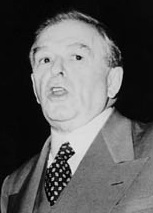

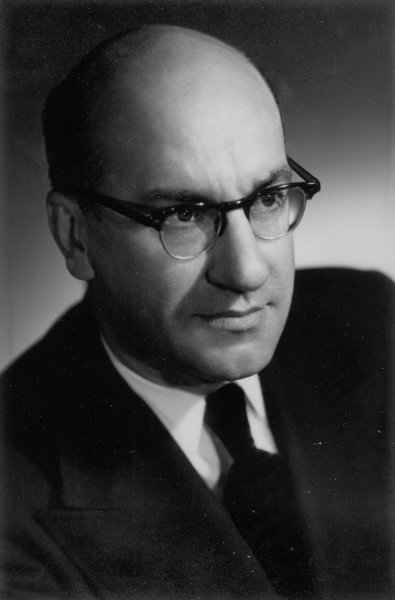
	First party	Second party
Leader	Maurice Duplessis	Georges-Émile Lapalme
Party	Union Nationale	Liberal
Leader since	June 20, 1936	May 20, 1950
Leader's seat	Trois-Rivières	Montréal-Outremont
Last election	68 seats, 50.5%	23 seats, 45.77%
Seats won	72	20
Seat change	▲4	▼3
Percentage	51.8%	44.87%
Swing	▲1.3pp	▼0.9pp
Premier before election
Maurice Duplessis
Union Nationale
Premier after election
Maurice Duplessis
Union Nationale

The 1956 Quebec general election was held on June 20, 1956, to elect members of the Legislative Assembly of Quebec, Canada. The incumbent Union Nationale, led by Maurice Duplessis, won re-election, defeating the Quebec Liberal Party, led by Georges-Émile Lapalme.

This was the fifth and final time (and the fourth in a row) that Duplessis led his party to a general election victory. No party has since been able to win more than three elections in a row. Duplessis died in office in 1959.

It was Lapalme's second (and final) loss in a row as Liberal leader. The Liberals did not manage to improve on their performance in the previous 1952 election.

== Expansion of the Legislative Assembly and titles ==
An Act passed in 1954 provided for the creation of the new electoral district of Jonquière-Kénogami for the next election, which was carved out from Chicoutimi and Lac-Saint-Jean. In 1955, a bill was passed designated members of the assembly as Members of Provincial Parliament or MPPs.

== Campaign ==
The Liberals and the Union des électeurs pooled their resources to conduct a joint campaign against the UN in at least 50 ridings. They collaborated to such a degree that in February 1956 the Liberal MPP René Hamel had proposed a motion espousing social credit theory in the Assembly, and a joint rally was held in May 1956 in Shawinigan to mark that event. While the strategy was viewed within the parties as a means to maximize their strength in opposing the UN, the electorate tended to view it as being confusing, while the Montreal Gazette called it "an irresponsible alliance". There were also Liberals in the old guard that wanted the UN to win.

The Liberals supported four UdE and two Nationalist candidates, respectively running as Liberals and Independents, of which none won:

- on the Social Credit side, there were Réal Caouette (Abitibi-Est), Arthur Marcoux (Beauce), Urbain Lajeunesse (Îles-de-la-Madeleine) and Paul-Eugène Drolet (Portneuf),
- René Chaloult campaigned in the new riding of Jonquière-Kénogami, and came within 320 votes of winning. This would be his last campaign.
- Pierre Laporte, director of the magazine L'Action nationale and previously parliamentary correspondent for Le Devoir, ran in Montréal-Laurier. He would later campaign and win as a Liberal candidate in a 1961 byelection in Chambly.

One observer noted, "The Union Nationale’s strongly entrenched position could not be seriously challenged unless a united front was formed of all opposing groups." The UN chose to campaign on Quebec's right to fiscal autonomy, the party's accomplishments and the future of Ungava, while the Liberals' chances were restrained by their alliance with the UdE (while shutting out the Parti social démocratique), the choice of Chaloult and Laporte not to identify themselves as Liberal candidates, and the party's tendency to side with Ottawa's centralizing policies. The UN correctly assumed that Quebec voters, when given a choice, would prefer a nationalist policy over a social one.

The Union Nationale notably used the importation of 300,000 eggs from communist Poland to attack the liberal opposition.

Riding contests, by number of candidates (1956)
Candidates	UN	Lib	PSD	Lab-Pr	Ind	I-Lib	I-UN	Lab	UN-Lab	CF	Total
2	50	49			1						100
3	20	20	7	10	1		1	1			60
4	13	12	10	12	1	2	1			1	52
5	5	5	4	5	1	1	3	1			25
6	2	2	2	2	1		2		1		12
7	1	1	1	1		3					7
8	2	2	2	2	2	2	3	1			16
Total	93	91	26	32	7	8	10	3	1	1	272

== Results ==
Elections to the Legislative Assembly of Quebec (1956)
Political party	Party leader	MPPs				Votes			
Political party	Party leader	Candidates	1952	1956	±	#	±	%	± (pp)
Union Nationale	Maurice Duplessis	93	68	72	4▲	956,082	108,099▲	51.80%	1.30▲
Liberal	Georges-Émile Lapalme	92	23	20	3▼	828,264	59,725▲	44.87%	0.90▼
Social Democratic	Thérèse Casgrain	26	–	–	–	11,232	4,807▼	0.61%	0.35▼
Labor–Progressive	Gui Caron	32	–	–	–	6,517	2,585▲	0.35%	0.12▲
Other candidates									
█ Independent		7	1	1	Steady	33,205	19,359▲	1.80%	0.98▲
█ Independent-Liberal		7	–	–	–	4,438	528▼	0.24%	0.06▼
█ Independent-Unionist		10	–	–	–	4,108	9,089▼	0.22%	0.57▼
█ Labour		3	–	–	–	1,274	247▲	0.07%	0.01▲
█ Union Nationale-Labour		1	–	–	–	516	New	0.03%	New
█ Capital familial		1	–	–	–	93	New	0.01%	New
Total		272	92	93		1,845,729		100%	
Rejected ballots						28,781	3,133▲		
Voter turnout						1,874,510	169,599▲	78.32	2.44▲
Registered electors						2,393,360	146,362▲		

=== Vote and seat summaries ===
Ternary plots - shift of electoral support (1952-1956)
1952

1956
Electoral districts identified by colours of winning parties

Popular vote
UN	51.80%
PLQ	44.87%
Others	3.33%

Seats summary
UN	77.42%
PLQ	21.51%
Others	1.08%

=== Synopsis of results ===
Results by riding - 1956 Quebec general election
Riding	Winning party						Turnout (Note: including spoilt ballots)	Votes									
Name	1952	Party	Votes	Share	Margin #	Margin %	Turnout	UN	Lib	PSD	Lab-Pr	Ind	I-Lib	I-UN	Lab	Other	Total
Abitibi-Est	UN	UN	13,967	53.94%	2,200	8.50%	81.31%	13,967	11,767	–	–	–	–	–	160	–	25,894
Abitibi-Ouest	UN	Lib	6,207	50.66%	161	1.31%	89.27%	6,046	6,207	–	–	–	–	–	–	–	12,253
Argenteuil	UN	UN	7,153	55.54%	1,427	11.08%	86.07%	7,153	5,726	–	–	–	–	–	–	–	12,879
Arthabaska	UN	UN	10,189	54.74%	1,765	9.48%	92.72%	10,189	8,424	–	–	–	–	–	–	–	18,613
Bagot	UN	UN	5,696	61.46%	2,124	22.92%	90.76%	5,696	3,572	–	–	–	–	–	–	–	9,268
Beauce	UN	UN	13,432	56.66%	3,158	13.32%	88.52%	13,432	10,274	–	–	–	–	–	–	–	23,706
Beauharnois	UN	UN	11,928	58.31%	3,450	16.87%	87.96%	11,928	8,478	–	50	–	–	–	–	–	20,456
Bellechasse	UN	UN	6,243	57.89%	1,702	15.78%	82.86%	6,243	4,541	–	–	–	–	–	–	–	10,784
Berthier	UN	UN	7,123	56.17%	1,565	12.34%	90.30%	7,123	5,558	–	–	–	–	–	–	–	12,681
Bonaventure	UN	Lib	8,551	52.68%	869	5.35%	84.06%	7,682	8,551	–	–	–	–	–	–	–	16,233
Brome	UN	Lib	3,274	51.66%	245	3.87%	83.36%	3,029	3,274	–	–	–	–	–	–	–	6,338
Chambly	UN	Lib	20,031	49.43%	767	1.89%	76.45%	19,264	20,031	877	150	–	205	–	–	–	40,527
Champlain	UN	UN	12,579	58.93%	3,814	17.87%	90.32%	12,579	8,765	–	–	–	–	–	–	–	21,344
Charlevoix	UN	UN	7,729	60.37%	2,655	20.74%	87.17%	7,729	5,074	–	–	–	–	–	–	–	12,803
Châteauguay	UN	UN	5,936	57.10%	1,477	14.21%	85.59%	5,936	4,459	–	–	–	–	–	–	–	10,395
Chicoutimi	UN	UN	19,103	67.22%	9,788	34.44%	87.25%	19,103	9,315	–	–	–	–	–	–	–	28,418
Compton	UN	Lib	5,542	51.41%	401	3.72%	85.72%	5,141	5,542	98	–	–	–	–	–	–	10,781
Deux-Montagnes	UN	UN	8,133	72.31%	5,162	45.90%	83.43%	8,133	2,971	143	–	–	–	–	–	–	11,247
Dorchester	UN	UN	9,569	60.74%	3,385	21.49%	85.40%	9,569	6,184	–	–	–	–	–	–	–	15,753
Drummond	Lib	UN	13,211	53.83%	1,928	7.86%	91.52%	13,211	11,283	–	47	–	–	–	–	–	24,541
Frontenac	Lib	UN	6,451	52.12%	524	4.23%	89.65%	6,451	5,927	–	–	–	–	–	–	–	12,378
Gaspé-Nord	UN	UN	4,574	50.40%	135	1.49%	84.26%	4,574	4,439	–	–	62	–	–	–	–	9,075
Gaspé-Sud	UN	UN	8,016	56.03%	1,726	12.06%	85.67%	8,016	6,290	–	–	–	–	–	–	–	14,306
Gatineau	UN	UN	8,206	55.96%	1,748	11.92%	76.32%	8,206	6,458	–	–	–	–	–	–	–	14,664
Hull	UN	Lib	10,564	45.70%	143	0.62%	83.05%	10,421	10,564	157	79	–	–	1,895	–	–	23,116
Huntingdon	UN	UN	3,273	52.33%	291	4.65%	84.69%	3,273	2,982	–	–	–	–	–	–	–	6,255
Iberville	UN	UN	3,903	57.22%	985	14.44%	88.13%	3,903	2,918	–	–	–	–	–	–	–	6,821
Îles-de-la-Madeleine	UN	UN	2,591	56.72%	614	13.44%	89.09%	2,591	1,977	–	–	–	–	–	–	–	4,568
Jacques-Cartier	Lib	Lib	31,385	55.39%	9,094	16.05%	70.68%	22,291	31,385	2,322	668	–	–	–	–	–	56,666
Joliette	UN	UN	11,500	64.88%	5,275	29.76%	86.06%	11,500	6,225	–	–	–	–	–	–	–	17,725
Jonquière-Kénogami	New	UN	11,946	50.68%	320	1.36%	88.00%	11,946	–	–	–	11,626	–	–	–	–	23,572
Kamouraska	UN	UN	6,489	58.30%	1,847	16.59%	81.48%	6,489	4,642	–	–	–	–	–	–	–	11,131
L'Assomption	UN	UN	7,260	55.53%	1,445	11.05%	87.97%	7,260	5,815	–	–	–	–	–	–	–	13,075
L'Islet	UN	UN	5,322	53.25%	649	6.49%	86.54%	5,322	4,673	–	–	–	–	–	–	–	9,995
Labelle	UN	UN	6,717	62.07%	2,658	24.56%	87.41%	6,717	4,059	–	46	–	–	–	–	–	10,822
Lac-Saint-Jean	UN	UN	8,544	54.49%	1,408	8.98%	92.66%	8,544	7,136	–	–	–	–	–	–	–	15,680
Laval	UN	UN	50,417	53.91%	9,203	9.84%	70.51%	50,417	41,214	1,129	763	–	–	–	–	–	93,523
Laviolette	UN	UN	11,848	59.46%	3,769	18.91%	82.94%	11,848	8,079	–	–	–	–	–	–	–	19,927
Lévis	Lib	UN	12,220	54.30%	2,114	9.39%	90.04%	12,220	10,106	–	18	–	–	161	–	–	22,505
Lotbinière	UN	UN	7,052	57.23%	1,781	14.45%	89.41%	7,052	5,271	–	–	–	–	–	–	–	12,323
Maisonneuve	Lib	UN	20,668	50.93%	2,469	6.08%	68.96%	20,668	18,199	227	176	249	119	941	–	–	40,579
Maskinongé	UN	UN	5,588	57.26%	1,417	14.52%	93.04%	5,588	4,171	–	–	–	–	–	–	–	9,759
Matane	UN	UN	10,109	57.93%	2,769	15.87%	84.28%	10,109	7,340	–	–	–	–	–	–	–	17,449
Matapédia	UN	UN	7,205	54.66%	1,229	9.32%	86.00%	7,205	5,976	–	–	–	–	–	–	–	13,181
Mégantic	UN	UN	12,123	52.50%	1,155	5.00%	92.22%	12,123	10,968	–	–	–	–	–	–	–	23,091
Missisquoi	UN	UN	7,001	56.72%	1,658	13.43%	86.03%	7,001	5,343	–	–	–	–	–	–	–	12,344
Montcalm	UN	UN	4,585	56.67%	1,079	13.34%	89.26%	4,585	3,506	–	–	–	–	–	–	–	8,091
Montmagny	UN	UN	6,403	55.92%	1,355	11.83%	87.37%	6,403	5,048	–	–	–	–	–	–	–	11,451
Montmorency	UN	UN	6,628	59.53%	2,165	19.44%	90.72%	6,628	4,463	–	43	–	–	–	–	–	11,134
Montréal–Jeanne-Mance	Lib	UN	29,076	49.76%	3,439	5.88%	66.38%	29,076	25,637	334	239	238	1,798	91	1,025	–	58,438
Montréal-Laurier	UN	UN	17,154	60.26%	7,491	26.31%	70.86%	17,154	–	–	–	9,663	1,652	–	–	–	28,469
Montréal-Mercier	UN	UN	18,165	60.03%	6,705	22.16%	65.79%	18,165	11,460	162	383	–	–	–	89	–	30,259
Montréal–Notre-Dame-de-Grâce	Lib	Lib	28,175	77.44%	21,106	58.01%	55.29%	7,069	28,175	629	510	–	–	–	–	–	36,383
Montréal-Outremont	Lib	Lib	24,348	67.83%	14,331	39.93%	55.80%	10,017	24,348	726	802	–	–	–	–	–	35,893
Montréal–Saint-Henri	Lib	Lib	17,344	51.30%	1,960	5.80%	70.57%	15,384	17,344	234	156	–	–	172	–	516	33,806
Montréal–Saint-Jacques	UN	UN	11,206	62.36%	4,922	27.39%	63.90%	11,206	6,284	279	200	–	–	–	–	–	17,969
Montréal–Saint-Louis	Lib	Lib	12,276	49.47%	2,461	9.92%	52.88%	9,815	12,276	425	649	–	1,650	–	–	–	24,815
Montréal–Sainte-Anne	Ind	Ind	10,520	66.01%	6,432	40.36%	60.75%	587	4,088	145	167	10,520	–	429	–	–	15,936
Montréal–Sainte-Marie	Lib	UN	15,051	54.80%	3,853	14.03%	67.93%	15,051	11,198	195	172	847	–	–	–	–	27,463
Montréal-Verdun	Lib	Lib	20,175	70.12%	13,361	46.43%	64.50%	6,814	20,175	1,785	–	–	–	–	–	–	28,774
Napierville-Laprairie	UN	UN	7,861	53.81%	1,166	7.98%	89.28%	7,861	6,695	–	52	–	–	–	–	–	14,608
Nicolet	UN	UN	8,498	59.33%	2,673	18.66%	86.53%	8,498	5,825	–	–	–	–	–	–	–	14,323
Papineau	UN	UN	11,164	56.21%	2,467	12.42%	87.78%	11,164	8,697	–	–	–	–	–	–	–	19,861
Pontiac	UN	UN	6,201	71.83%	3,769	43.66%	79.30%	6,201	2,432	–	–	–	–	–	–	–	8,633
Portneuf	UN	UN	12,810	60.72%	4,523	21.44%	87.52%	12,810	8,287	–	–	–	–	–	–	–	21,097
Québec-Centre	UN	UN	10,983	60.18%	3,715	20.36%	81.48%	10,983	7,268	–	–	–	–	–	–	–	18,251
Québec-Comté	Lib	UN	21,272	56.22%	5,047	13.34%	85.59%	21,272	16,225	–	63	–	–	280	–	–	37,840
Québec-Est	Lib	UN	20,173	55.47%	4,090	11.25%	85.85%	20,173	16,083	–	112	–	–	–	–	–	36,368
Québec-Ouest	Lib	Lib	10,073	50.40%	158	0.79%	82.76%	9,915	10,073	–	–	–	–	–	–	–	19,988
Richelieu	Lib	UN	9,552	54.28%	1,590	9.03%	89.78%	9,552	7,962	66	19	–	–	–	–	–	17,599
Richmond	Lib	Lib	9,470	51.49%	742	4.03%	90.47%	8,728	9,470	–	194	–	–	–	–	–	18,392
Rimouski	UN	Lib	9,911	51.05%	408	2.10%	85.03%	9,503	9,911	–	–	–	–	–	–	–	19,414
Rivière-du-Loup	UN	Lib	8,623	51.24%	556	3.30%	87.88%	8,067	8,623	–	–	–	–	139	–	–	16,829
Roberval	UN	UN	10,903	52.50%	1,038	5.00%	88.94%	10,903	9,865	–	–	–	–	–	–	–	20,768
Rouville	UN	UN	5,277	52.84%	567	5.68%	87.54%	5,277	4,710	–	–	–	–	–	–	–	9,987
Rouyn-Noranda	UN	Lib	7,561	51.16%	1,007	6.81%	84.35%	6,554	7,561	665	–	–	–	–	–	–	14,780
Saguenay	UN	UN	10,899	58.60%	3,198	17.19%	75.91%	10,899	7,701	–	–	–	–	–	–	–	18,600
Saint-Hyacinthe	UN	Lib	9,965	51.67%	669	3.47%	83.85%	9,296	9,965	–	24	–	–	–	–	–	19,285
Saint-Jean	UN	UN	8,279	56.17%	1,901	12.90%	85.62%	8,279	6,378	55	27	–	–	–	–	–	14,739
Saint-Maurice	Lib	Lib	13,851	51.37%	741	2.75%	90.44%	13,110	13,851	–	–	–	–	–	–	–	26,961
Saint-Sauveur	UN	UN	16,117	68.77%	8,862	37.81%	87.43%	16,117	7,255	–	64	–	–	–	–	–	23,436
Shefford	Lib	UN	11,534	53.59%	1,627	7.56%	85.31%	11,534	9,907	–	82	–	–	–	–	–	21,523
Sherbrooke	UN	UN	16,588	55.30%	3,438	11.46%	78.62%	16,588	13,150	73	185	–	–	–	–	–	29,996
Stanstead	UN	UN	7,815	50.26%	81	0.52%	82.63%	7,815	7,734	–	–	–	–	–	–	–	15,549
Témiscamingue	Lib	UN	4,078	50.83%	133	1.66%	86.26%	4,078	3,945	–	–	–	–	–	–	–	8,023
Témiscouata	UN	UN	6,299	59.35%	1,985	18.70%	85.36%	6,299	4,314	–	–	–	–	–	–	–	10,613
Terrebonne	UN	UN	20,984	57.57%	5,704	15.65%	85.34%	20,984	15,280	107	77	–	–	–	–	–	36,448
Trois-Rivières	UN	UN	16,263	61.73%	6,327	24.02%	88.23%	16,263	9,936	–	52	–	–	–	–	93	26,344
Vaudreuil-Soulanges	UN	UN	7,681	51.00%	370	2.46%	85.94%	7,681	7,311	70	–	–	–	–	–	–	15,062
Verchères	Lib	UN	5,104	53.06%	627	6.52%	89.67%	5,104	4,477	39	–	–	–	–	–	–	9,620
Westmount–Saint-Georges	Lib	Lib	13,808	80.05%	10,870	63.02%	51.26%	2,938	13,808	255	248	–	–	–	–	–	17,249
Wolfe	Lib	UN	4,058	50.31%	50	0.62%	93.33%	4,058	4,008	–	–	–	–	–	–	–	8,066
Yamaska	UN	UN	4,736	66.22%	2,320	32.44%	85.90%	4,736	2,416	–	–	–	–	–	–	–	7,152

= open seat
= turnout is above provincial average
= winning candidate was in previous Legislature
= incumbent had switched allegiance
= not incumbent; was previously elected to the Legislature
= incumbency arose from byelection gain
= previously incumbent in another riding
= other incumbents renominated
= UdE candidates under the Liberal banner
= Nationalist candidates supported by the Liberals
= multiple candidates

=== Analysis ===
Party candidates in 2nd place
Party in 1st place	Party in 2nd place			Total
Party in 1st place	UN	Lib	Ind	Total
Union Nationale		70	2	72
Liberal	20			20
Independent		1		1
Total	20	71	2	93

Candidates ranked 1st to 5th place, by party
Parties	1st	2nd	3rd	4th	5th	Total
█ Union Nationale	72	20	1			93
█ Liberal	20	71				92
█ Independent	1	2	2		1	6
█ Social Democratic			16	6	2	24
█ Labor–Progressive			13	11	5	29
█ Independent UN			5	3	1	9
█ Independent Liberal			3	2		5
█ Labour			1	1	1	3
█ UN-Labour			1			1
█ Capital familial			1			1

Resulting composition of the 23rd Quebec Legislative Assembly
Source		Party			
Source		UN	Lib	Ind	Total
Seats retained	Incumbents returned	55	9	1	65
Seats retained	Open seats held	3	1		4
Seats changing hands	Incumbents defeated	9	6		15
Seats changing hands	Incumbents defeated - previous incumbents returned	3			3
Seats changing hands	Open seats gained	1	4		5
New ridings	New MPP elected	1			1
Total		72	20	1	93

== See also ==
- List of Quebec premiers
- Politics of Quebec
- Timeline of Quebec history
- List of Quebec political parties
- 25th Legislative Assembly of Quebec
