= Henri Groulx =

Canadian politician

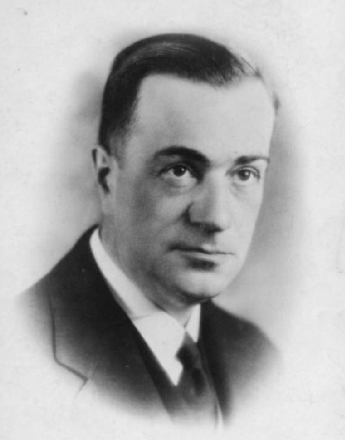

Member of the Legislative Assembly of Quebec for Montréal-Outremont
- In office 1939–1952
- Preceded by: District was created in 1939
- Succeeded by: Georges-Émile Lapalme

Personal details
- Born: 21 May 1888 Montreal, Quebec
- Died: 16 July 1952 (aged 64) Outremont, Quebec
- Party: Liberal

Henri Groulx (21 May 1888 – 16 July 1952) was a Canadian pharmacist and politician.

Born in Montreal, Quebec, Groulx was educated at the Collège Mont-Saint-Louis, Collège Saint-Laurent and at Université Laval à Montréal. He was a pharmacist since 1914 and owned a pharmacy.

He was elected to the Legislative Assembly of Quebec for Montréal-Outremont in 1939. A Liberal, he was re-elected in 1944, 1948, and 1952. He was a Provincial Secretary (1939-1940), Minister of Health (1939-1941), Minister of Welfare (1940-1941), and Minister of Health and Welfare (1941-1944).

He received an honorary degree in pharmacy from the Université de Montréal on May 30, 1941.

He died on 16 July 1952, the night of the election, in Outremont and was entombed at the Notre Dame des Neiges Cemetery in Montreal.
