= Montréal-Outremont =

Former provincial electoral district in Quebec, Canada

Coordinates: 45.517°N 73.609°W

Quebec electoral district

Defunct provincial electoral district
- Legislature: National Assembly of Quebec
- District created: 1939
- District abolished: 1965
- First contested: 1939
- Last contested: 1962

Montréal-Outremont (French pronunciation: [mɔ̃ʁeal utʁəmɔ̃]) was a former provincial electoral district in the Montreal region of Quebec, Canada that elected members to the Legislative Assembly of Quebec.

It was created for the 1939 election from part of Westmount electoral district. Its final election was in 1962. It disappeared in the 1966 election and its successor electoral district was Outremont.

== Members of the Legislative Assembly ==
| Legislature | Years | Member | Party |
|---|---|---|---|
Riding created from Westmount
| 21st | 1939–1944 | Henri Groulx | Liberal |
| 22nd | 1944–1948 | Henri Groulx | Liberal |
| 23rd | 1948–1952 | Henri Groulx | Liberal |
| 24th | 1952–1953 | Henri Groulx | Liberal |
| 24th | 1953–1956 | Georges-Émile Lapalme | Liberal |
| 25th | 1956–1960 | Georges-Émile Lapalme | Liberal |
| 26th | 1960–1962 | Georges-Émile Lapalme | Liberal |
| 27th | 1962–1966 | Georges-Émile Lapalme | Liberal |
Dissolved into Outremont
