= Albiny Paquette =

Canadian politician (1888–1978)

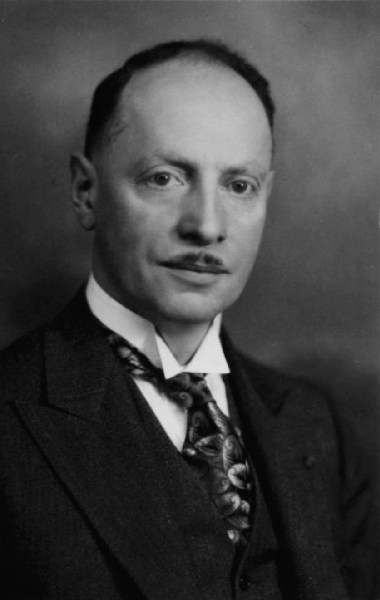

Member of the Legislative Assembly of Quebec for Labelle
- In office 1935–1958
- Preceded by: Pierre Lortie
- Succeeded by: Pierre Bohémier

Member of the Legislative Council of Quebec for Rougemont
- In office 1958–1967
- Preceded by: Wilfrid Bovey
- Succeeded by: Jean-Guy Cardinal

Personal details
- Born: October 7, 1888 Marieville, Quebec
- Died: September 25, 1978 (aged 89) Mont-Laurier, Quebec
- Party: Union Nationale
- Spouse(s): Marcelle Lévy-Génard; Rose Daviault
- Children: Gilbert
- Education: Collège Mont-Saint-Louis, Universite Laval
- Profession: physician

Joseph-Henri-Albiny Paquette (October 7, 1888 – September 25, 1978) was a Quebec politician and physician. He was a cabinet minister for 17 years in Maurice Duplessis's Union Nationale government.

== Biography ==
Born in Marieville, Quebec, Paquette studied in medical sciences at the Montreal campus of Université Laval. After additional studies and training at Bellevue Hospital in New York City, Paquette worked first for the Canadian Red Cross in the Balkans and then in the Canadian Expeditionary Force as a medical officer. He also served at several hospitals in Europe, including in Paris and in England.

Paquette returned to Quebec in 1919 and practiced medicine in Mont-Laurier until his entry into municipal politics and his nine-year stint as mayor of that city.

Paquette was first elected to the Legislative Assembly of Quebec for the district of Labelle in the 1935 general election as a member of Action libérale nationale. He was reelected, as a member of the Union Nationale, in all six subsequent elections from 1936 to 1956. Paquette remained as the Legislative Assembly Member for Labelle until he resigned in 1958.

In 1936, he was appointed as the first Minister of Health in the Duplessis Cabinet for the newly created provincial department of health. He served in the position from 1936 to 1939 and again from 1944 to 1958 when the Union Nationale regained power. Establishments made during his tenure as health minister included:

- parish clinics for maternal and infant health
- mobile tuberculosis screening units
- Dr. Armand Frappier's Institut de microbiologie et d'hygiène (today known as the Institut Armand-Frappier) at the Université de Montréal.

In 1958, he was appointed to the Legislative Council of Quebec for the division of Rougemont and resigned in 1967.

In support of Catholicism, he placed crucifixes above the chairs of the speakers in the Legislative Assembly and the Legislative Council.

He received several honours, distinctions and medals, including honorary doctorates for Université Laval, Université de Montréal, and Bishop's College.

Other rewards include:

- 1919 - decorated by the Prince of Wales
- 1920 - Military Medal of the British government
- Honour Cross of the French government
- 1937 - a perpetual member of the Holy Land by the Catholic Church
- 1938 a member of the Latin Order (1938)
- 1946 - Jerusalem Cross
- 1953 - Queen Elizabeth II Coronation Medal
- 1967 - Medal of the Canadian Centennial
