= 1952 Quebec general election =

Canadian provincial election

- July 16, 1952

92 seats in the 24th Legislative Assembly of Quebec 47 seats were needed for a majority
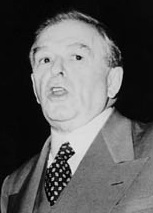

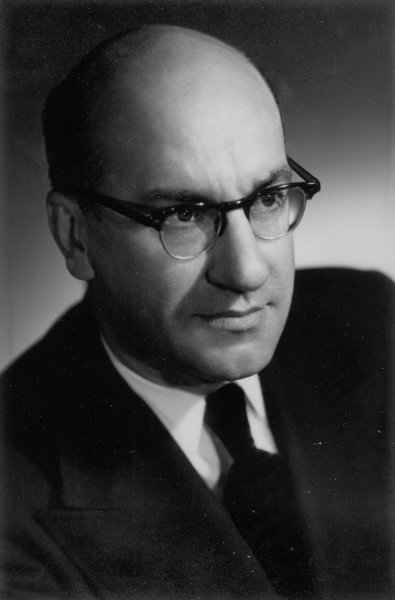
	First party	Second party
Leader	Maurice Duplessis	Georges-Émile Lapalme
Party	Union Nationale	Liberal
Leader since	June 20, 1936	May 20, 1950
Leader's seat	Trois-Rivières	Ran in Joliette (defeated)
Last election	82 seats, 51.24%	8 seats, 33.17%
Seats won	68	23
Seat change	▼14	▲15
Percentage	50.5%	45.77%
Swing	▼0.74pp	▲12.6pp
Premier before election
Maurice Duplessis
Union Nationale
Premier after election
Maurice Duplessis
Union Nationale

The 1952 Quebec general election was held on July 16, 1952, to elect members of the Legislative Assembly of the Province of Quebec, Canada. The incumbent Union Nationale, led by Maurice Duplessis, won re-election, defeating the Quebec Liberal Party, led by Georges-Émile Lapalme.

This was the fourth time (and the third in a row) that Duplessis led his party to a general election victory.

The number of seats won by the Liberals, and their share of the popular vote, were considerably increased over the previous election in 1948.

== Campaign ==
Thérèse Casgrain became the first female leader of a Quebec political party, heading the CCF.

Of the 92 races, 56 were two-way contests between the two major parties:

Riding contests, by number of candidates (1952)
Candidates	UN	Lib	CCF	I-UN	I-Lib	Ind	Lab-Pr	Lbr	PN	Total
2	56	56								112
3	23	24	11	8	2	2		1	1	72
4	8	8	8	2	2		2	2		32
5	4	4	4		4	2	2			20
Total	91	92	23	10	8	4	4	3	1	236

== Outcome ==
Henri Groulx (Montréal-Outremont) was the first candidate to learn that he had been reelected, but he died within an hour of hearing the news. Georges-Émile Lapalme, who had lost his campaign to take Joliette, would subsequently win the Outremont byelection held on July 9, 1953.

There were two notable results that arose from the election:

- From 1952 until the 1966 election, Frank Hanley (Montréal–Sainte-Anne) would be the only candidate outside the UN and Liberals to win a seat in the Legislature.
- For the first time since the 1936 election, no party other than the UN and the Liberals received more than 1% of the popular vote. This would continue until 1966.

== Results ==
Elections to the Legislative Assembly of Quebec (1952)
Political party	Party leader	MLAs				Votes			
Political party	Party leader	Candidates	1948	1952	±	#	±	%	± (pp)
Union Nationale	Maurice Duplessis	91	82	68	14▼	847,983	72,236▲	50.50%	0.75▼
Liberal	Georges-Émile Lapalme	92	8	23	15▲	768,539	221,061▲	45.77%	9.61▲
Co-operative Commonwealth	Thérèse Casgrain	23	–	–	–	16,039	7,023▲	0.96%	0.36▲
Union des électeurs		did not campaign							
Other candidates									
█ Independent		4	2	1	1▼	13,846	10,110▼	0.82%	0.76▼
█ Independent-Unionist		10	–	–	–	13,197	4,548▲	0.79%	0.22▲
Parti National (Note: contested by René Chaloult (Québec-Comté), who had previously won as an independent in 1948. This was the only riding in which the UN did not field a candidate but Léopold Larochelle did campaign as an Independent Unionist.)		1	–	–	–	9,734	New	0.58%	New
█ Independent-Liberal		8	–	–	–	4,966	1,998▲	0.30%	0.10▲
█ Labor–Progressive		4	–	–	–	3,932	967▼	0.23%	0.09▼
█ Labour		3	–	–	–	1,027	71▼	0.06%	0.01▼
Total		236	92	92		1,679,263		100%	
Rejected ballots						25,648	7,720▲		
Voter turnout						1,704,911	173,012▲	75.88	0.66▲
Registered electors						2,246,998	210,422▲		

=== Vote and seat summaries ===
Ternary plots - shift of electoral support (1948-1952)
1948

1952
Electoral districts identified by colours of winning parties

Seats and popular vote by party
Party	Seats	Votes	Change (pp)
█ Union Nationale	68 / 92	50.50%	-0.75
█ Liberal	23 / 92	45.77%	9.61
█ Independent	1 / 92	0.82%	-0.76
█ Other	0 / 92	2.91%	-8.10

=== Synopsis of results ===
Results by riding - 1952 Quebec general election
Riding	Winning party						Turnout (Note: including spoilt ballots)	Votes									
Name	1948	Party	Votes	Share	Margin #	Margin %	Turnout	UN	Lib	CCF	Ind	PN	I-UN	I-Lib	Lab-Pr	Lab	Total
Abitibi-Est	UN	UN	12,497	57.01%	3,074	14.02%	77.64%	12,497	9,423	–	–	–	–	–	–	–	21,920
Abitibi-Ouest	UN	UN	6,713	55.15%	1,254	10.30%	87.83%	6,713	5,459	–	–	–	–	–	–	–	12,172
Argenteuil	UN	UN	8,248	67.92%	4,352	35.84%	83.18%	8,248	3,896	–	–	–	–	–	–	–	12,144
Arthabaska	UN	UN	9,003	53.31%	1,119	6.63%	91.17%	9,003	7,884	–	–	–	–	–	–	–	16,887
Bagot	UN	UN	5,126	57.78%	1,381	15.57%	89.35%	5,126	3,745	–	–	–	–	–	–	–	8,871
Beauce	UN	UN	12,939	58.21%	3,649	16.42%	88.09%	12,939	9,290	–	–	–	–	–	–	–	22,229
Beauharnois	UN	UN	10,968	61.25%	4,030	22.51%	82.95%	10,968	6,938	–	–	–	–	–	–	–	17,906
Bellechasse	UN	UN	5,814	54.65%	989	9.30%	81.31%	5,814	4,825	–	–	–	–	–	–	–	10,639
Berthier	UN	UN	6,225	51.14%	277	2.28%	89.17%	6,225	5,948	–	–	–	–	–	–	–	12,173
Bonaventure	UN	UN	8,875	52.14%	730	4.29%	87.00%	8,875	8,145	–	–	–	–	–	–	–	17,020
Brome	UN	UN	3,982	60.57%	1,550	23.58%	83.84%	3,982	2,432	160	–	–	–	–	–	–	6,574
Chambly	UN	UN	18,486	56.54%	5,120	15.66%	74.16%	18,486	13,366	846	–	–	–	–	–	–	32,698
Champlain	UN	UN	11,634	59.94%	3,860	19.89%	88.79%	11,634	7,774	–	–	–	–	–	–	–	19,408
Charlevoix	UN	UN	7,454	62.64%	3,133	26.33%	83.20%	7,454	4,321	–	–	–	125	–	–	–	11,900
Châteauguay	UN	UN	4,691	53.70%	647	7.41%	84.19%	4,691	4,044	–	–	–	–	–	–	–	8,735
Chicoutimi	UN	UN	29,572	65.66%	14,106	31.32%	83.35%	29,572	15,466	–	–	–	–	–	–	–	45,038
Compton	UN	UN	6,349	59.58%	2,140	20.08%	83.85%	6,349	4,209	98	–	–	–	–	–	–	10,656
Deux-Montagnes	UN	UN	7,257	74.97%	4,991	51.56%	81.47%	7,257	2,266	157	–	–	–	–	–	–	9,680
Dorchester	UN	UN	9,764	61.92%	3,758	23.83%	85.58%	9,764	6,006	–	–	–	–	–	–	–	15,770
Drummond	UN	Lib	11,873	50.25%	118	0.50%	88.97%	11,755	11,873	–	–	–	–	–	–	–	23,628
Frontenac	UN	Lib	6,464	51.13%	286	2.26%	91.07%	6,178	6,464	–	–	–	–	–	–	–	12,642
Gaspé-Nord	Lib	UN	4,364	52.45%	438	5.26%	89.43%	4,364	3,926	–	–	–	30	–	–	–	8,320
Gaspé-Sud	UN	UN	8,473	61.41%	3,148	22.81%	84.66%	8,473	5,325	–	–	–	–	–	–	–	13,798
Gatineau	UN	UN	8,268	60.04%	3,251	23.61%	77.36%	8,268	5,017	–	–	–	486	–	–	–	13,771
Hull	UN	UN	12,354	60.73%	5,043	24.79%	79.08%	12,354	7,311	679	–	–	–	–	–	–	20,344
Huntingdon	UN	UN	3,162	52.11%	256	4.22%	82.87%	3,162	2,906	–	–	–	–	–	–	–	6,068
Iberville	UN	UN	3,597	58.49%	1,044	16.98%	85.98%	3,597	2,553	–	–	–	–	–	–	–	6,150
Îles-de-la-Madeleine	UN	UN	2,463	57.99%	679	15.99%	89.86%	2,463	1,784	–	–	–	–	–	–	–	4,247
Jacques-Cartier	Lib	Lib	22,847	53.70%	4,795	11.27%	68.73%	18,052	22,847	1,645	–	–	–	–	–	–	42,544
Joliette	UN	UN	10,281	57.88%	2,799	15.76%	89.29%	10,281	7,482	–	–	–	–	–	–	–	17,763
Kamouraska	UN	UN	6,723	59.65%	2,175	19.30%	82.79%	6,723	4,548	–	–	–	–	–	–	–	11,271
L'Assomption	UN	UN	6,169	55.44%	1,211	10.88%	88.55%	6,169	4,958	–	–	–	–	–	–	–	11,127
L'Islet	UN	UN	5,718	57.10%	1,422	14.20%	85.27%	5,718	4,296	–	–	–	–	–	–	–	10,014
Labelle	UN	UN	6,394	58.97%	1,945	17.94%	87.78%	6,394	4,449	–	–	–	–	–	–	–	10,843
Lac-Saint-Jean	UN	UN	8,180	57.87%	2,385	16.87%	85.78%	8,180	5,795	–	–	–	161	–	–	–	14,136
Laval	UN	UN	34,656	52.40%	5,972	9.03%	66.97%	34,656	28,684	771	–	–	2,031	–	–	–	66,142
Laviolette	UN	UN	9,598	52.67%	972	5.33%	82.44%	9,598	8,626	–	–	–	–	–	–	–	18,224
Lévis	UN	Lib	9,725	50.26%	99	0.51%	85.35%	9,626	9,725	–	–	–	–	–	–	–	19,351
Lotbinière	UN	UN	6,702	54.51%	1,108	9.01%	89.61%	6,702	5,594	–	–	–	–	–	–	–	12,296
Maisonneuve	UN	Lib	18,393	49.93%	672	1.82%	67.51%	17,721	18,393	723	–	–	–	–	–	–	36,837
Maskinongé	UN	UN	5,074	53.82%	721	7.65%	92.72%	5,074	4,353	–	–	–	–	–	–	–	9,427
Matane	UN	UN	10,241	58.89%	3,093	17.79%	86.76%	10,241	7,148	–	–	–	–	–	–	–	17,389
Matapédia	UN	UN	6,797	51.16%	427	3.21%	87.46%	6,797	6,370	–	118	–	–	–	–	–	13,285
Mégantic	UN	UN	10,710	51.38%	577	2.77%	91.04%	10,710	10,133	–	–	–	–	–	–	–	20,843
Missisquoi	UN	UN	7,191	61.42%	2,675	22.85%	82.40%	7,191	4,516	–	–	–	–	–	–	–	11,707
Montcalm	UN	UN	4,141	52.72%	428	5.45%	88.19%	4,141	3,713	–	–	–	–	–	–	–	7,854
Montmagny	UN	UN	6,409	59.49%	2,045	18.98%	83.13%	6,409	4,364	–	–	–	–	–	–	–	10,773
Montmorency	UN	UN	5,894	60.17%	1,992	20.33%	86.92%	5,894	3,902	–	–	–	–	–	–	–	9,796
Montréal–Jeanne-Mance	UN	Lib	22,666	48.48%	2,618	5.60%	62.83%	20,048	22,666	1,849	–	–	2,194	–	–	–	46,757
Montréal-Laurier	UN	UN	14,595	49.67%	1,791	6.10%	67.20%	14,595	12,804	436	–	–	–	1,549	–	–	29,384
Montréal-Mercier	UN	UN	16,280	51.88%	3,211	10.23%	64.15%	16,280	13,069	1,044	–	–	–	986	–	–	31,379
Montréal–Notre-Dame-de-Grâce	Lib	Lib	18,489	64.83%	11,516	40.38%	47.80%	6,973	18,489	634	2,066	–	–	359	–	–	28,521
Montréal-Outremont	Lib	Lib	18,794	61.01%	8,482	27.53%	51.62%	10,312	18,794	581	–	–	–	–	1,119	–	30,806
Montréal–Saint-Henri	UN	Lib	19,254	56.01%	5,153	14.99%	72.54%	14,101	19,254	562	–	–	–	–	–	460	34,377
Montréal–Saint-Jacques	UN	UN	11,049	54.08%	2,178	10.66%	60.43%	11,049	8,871	230	–	–	–	–	282	–	20,432
Montréal–Saint-Louis	Lib	Lib	15,226	50.36%	3,759	12.43%	50.94%	11,467	15,226	526	–	–	–	707	2,311	–	30,237
Montréal–Sainte-Anne	Ind	Ind	11,210	62.87%	5,621	31.52%	55.29%	410	5,589	445	11,210	–	–	177	–	–	17,831
Montréal–Sainte-Marie	UN	Lib	15,019	50.90%	1,773	6.01%	66.85%	13,246	15,019	218	–	–	–	806	220	–	29,509
Montréal-Verdun	Lib	Lib	17,219	62.17%	10,040	36.25%	61.09%	7,179	17,219	2,857	–	–	–	–	–	443	27,698
Napierville-Laprairie	UN	UN	7,094	57.29%	1,806	14.59%	88.47%	7,094	5,288	–	–	–	–	–	–	–	12,382
Nicolet	UN	UN	7,191	50.86%	242	1.71%	85.60%	7,191	6,949	–	–	–	–	–	–	–	14,140
Papineau	UN	UN	11,707	64.97%	5,794	32.15%	84.33%	11,707	5,913	400	–	–	–	–	–	–	18,020
Pontiac	UN	UN	5,792	61.22%	2,247	23.75%	83.90%	5,792	3,545	124	–	–	–	–	–	–	9,461
Portneuf	UN	UN	10,665	52.90%	1,676	8.31%	85.94%	10,665	8,989	–	–	–	508	–	–	–	20,162
Québec-Centre	UN	UN	9,593	54.50%	1,585	9.01%	76.09%	9,593	8,008	–	–	–	–	–	–	–	17,601
Québec-Comté	Ind	Lib	11,230	39.67%	1,496	5.28%	83.11%	–	11,230	–	–	9,734	7,344	–	–	–	28,308
Québec-Est	UN	Lib	15,778	51.12%	860	2.79%	81.22%	14,918	15,778	–	–	–	–	167	–	–	30,863
Québec-Ouest	UN	Lib	8,787	50.53%	183	1.05%	79.16%	8,604	8,787	–	–	–	–	–	–	–	17,391
Richelieu	UN	Lib	8,751	52.88%	954	5.77%	89.91%	7,797	8,751	–	–	–	–	–	–	–	16,548
Richmond	UN	Lib	8,156	51.07%	341	2.14%	87.33%	7,815	8,156	–	–	–	–	–	–	–	15,971
Rimouski	UN	UN	9,210	52.05%	981	5.54%	83.69%	9,210	8,229	–	–	–	256	–	–	–	17,695
Rivière-du-Loup	UN	UN	8,689	51.15%	453	2.67%	89.38%	8,689	8,236	–	–	–	62	–	–	–	16,987
Roberval	UN	UN	11,478	59.24%	3,579	18.47%	87.64%	11,478	7,899	–	–	–	–	–	–	–	19,377
Rouville	UN	UN	5,263	58.77%	1,571	17.54%	81.70%	5,263	3,692	–	–	–	–	–	–	–	8,955
Rouyn-Noranda	UN	UN	6,998	52.55%	678	5.09%	79.08%	6,998	6,320	–	–	–	–	–	–	–	13,318
Saguenay	UN	UN	8,977	62.55%	4,054	28.25%	75.34%	8,977	4,923	–	452	–	–	–	–	–	14,352
Saint-Hyacinthe	UN	UN	9,542	55.15%	1,783	10.31%	78.19%	9,542	7,759	–	–	–	–	–	–	–	17,301
Saint-Jean	UN	UN	7,901	60.64%	2,772	21.27%	83.44%	7,901	5,129	–	–	–	–	–	–	–	13,030
Saint-Maurice	UN	Lib	14,489	57.91%	3,960	15.83%	87.70%	10,529	14,489	–	–	–	–	–	–	–	25,018
Saint-Sauveur	UN	UN	12,877	57.02%	3,293	14.58%	85.54%	12,877	9,584	–	–	–	–	–	–	124	22,585
Shefford	UN	Lib	9,792	50.59%	230	1.19%	83.05%	9,562	9,792	–	–	–	–	–	–	–	19,354
Sherbrooke	UN	UN	14,905	55.77%	3,480	13.02%	74.15%	14,905	11,425	395	–	–	–	–	–	–	26,725
Stanstead	UN	UN	7,047	50.32%	91	0.65%	75.60%	7,047	6,956	–	–	–	–	–	–	–	14,003
Témiscamingue	UN	Lib	4,284	52.72%	442	5.44%	85.17%	3,842	4,284	–	–	–	–	–	–	–	8,126
Témiscouata	UN	UN	5,776	52.92%	638	5.85%	86.65%	5,776	5,138	–	–	–	–	–	–	–	10,914
Terrebonne	UN	UN	17,763	55.91%	3,970	12.50%	85.41%	17,763	13,793	–	–	–	–	215	–	–	31,771
Trois-Rivières	UN	UN	15,493	60.64%	5,435	21.27%	90.65%	15,493	10,058	–	–	–	–	–	–	–	25,551
Vaudreuil-Soulanges	UN	UN	7,235	55.44%	1,420	10.88%	83.14%	7,235	5,815	–	–	–	–	–	–	–	13,050
Verchères	Lib	Lib	4,673	53.97%	688	7.95%	88.13%	3,985	4,673	–	–	–	–	–	–	–	8,658
Westmount–Saint-Georges	Lib	Lib	12,455	75.99%	9,179	56.00%	46.48%	3,276	12,455	659	–	–	–	–	–	–	16,390
Wolfe	UN	Lib	3,995	50.42%	66	0.83%	92.33%	3,929	3,995	–	–	–	–	–	–	–	7,924
Yamaska	UN	UN	4,382	59.29%	1,373	18.58%	88.59%	4,382	3,009	–	–	–	–	–	–	–	7,391

= open seat
= turnout is above provincial average
= winning candidate was in previous Legislature
= incumbent had switched allegiance
= other incumbents renominated

=== Analysis ===
Party candidates in 2nd place
Party in 1st place	Party in 2nd place			Total
Party in 1st place	UN	Lib	Nat	Total
Union Nationale		68		68
Liberal	22		1	23
Independent		1		1
Total	22	69	1	92

Candidates ranked 1st to 5th place, by party
Parties	1st	2nd	3rd	4th	5th	Total
█ Union Nationale	68	22		1		91
█ Liberal	23	69				92
█ Independent	1		3			4
█ Parti National		1				1
█ Co-operative Commonwealth			15	6	2	23
█ Independent UN			10			10
█ Independent Liberal			4	2	2	8
█ Labor–Progressive			3	1		4
█ Labour			1	2		3

Resulting composition of the 24th Quebec Legislative Assembly
Source		Party			
Source		UN	Lib	Ind	Total
Seats retained	Incumbents returned	62	7	1	70
Seats retained	Open seats held	5			5
Seats changing hands	Incumbents defeated	1	16		17
Total		68	23	1	92

== See also ==
- List of Quebec premiers
- Politics of Quebec
- Timeline of Quebec history
- List of Quebec political parties
- 24th Legislative Assembly of Quebec
