= Georges-Émile Lapalme =

Canadian politician (1907–1985)

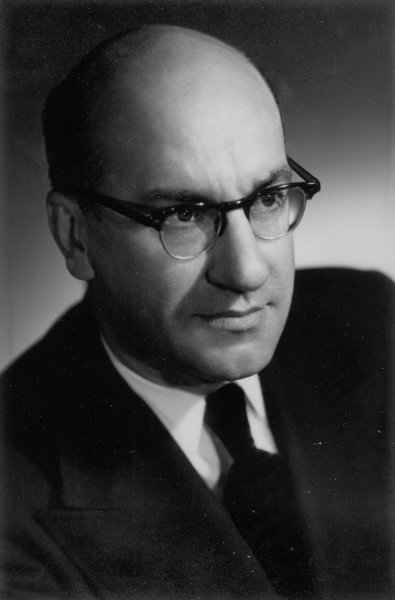
Image of Georges-Émile Lapalme

Georges-Émile Lapalme (January 14, 1907 – February 5, 1985) was a Quebec, Canada, politician who was a member of the Legislative Assembly of Quebec and leader of the Quebec Liberal Party.

== Background ==
Born in Montreal Lapalme studied law at the Université de Montréal. He was married to Maria Langlois for nearly 50 years with whom he had seven children.

== Member of Parliament ==
Lapalme was elected to the House of Commons of Canada in the 1945 federal election for the Liberal Party of Canada and served until 1950.

== Provincial politics ==
He resigned his federal seat to be acclaimed leader of the Liberal Party of Quebec in 1950. He ran for a seat to the Legislative Assembly of Quebec in the district of Joliette in the 1952 election but was defeated by the Labour Minister, the Union Nationale candidate Antonio Barrette.

Lapalme won a by-election in the district of Montréal-Outremont in 1953. He was re-elected in the 1956 election, but under his leadership, his party lost the election against the Union Nationale. He remained a Liberal leader until 1958 and remained Leader of the Opposition in Quebec until 1960.

It was during his leadership that the Quebec Liberal Party severed its affiliation with the Liberal Party of Canada in 1955.

== Member of the Cabinet ==
Lapalme won re-election in the 1960 and 1962 elections. He never became premier but served as deputy premier under Jean Lesage and as Attorney-General. Lapalme was also the province's first Minister of Cultural Affairs. He did not run for re-election in the 1966 election.

== See also ==
- Politics of Quebec
- Timeline of Quebec history
- List of Quebec general elections
- List of Quebec leaders of the Opposition
- History of Quebec

Party political offices
Preceded by Adélard Godbout	Leader of the Quebec Liberal Party; 1950–1958	Succeeded by Jean Lesage
National Assembly of Quebec
Preceded by Henri Groulx (Liberal)	MLA for Montréal-Outremont; 1953–1966	Succeeded by Jérôme Choquette (Liberal)
