= Montréal-Mercier =

Quebec electoral district

Defunct provincial electoral district
- Legislature: National Assembly of Quebec
- District created: 1922
- District abolished: 1965
- First contested: 1923
- Last contested: 1962

Montréal-Mercier (French pronunciation: [mɔ̃ʁeal mɛʁsje]) was a former provincial electoral district in the Montreal region of Quebec, Canada that elected members to the Legislative Assembly of Quebec.

It was created for the 1923 election from part of Montréal-Dorion and Montréal-Laurier electoral districts. Its final election was in 1962. It disappeared in the 1966 election and its successor electoral district was Mercier.

== Members of the Legislative Assembly ==
1. Adolphe L'Archevêque, Conservative Party (1923–1927)
2. Anatole Plante, Liberal (1927–1936)
3. Gérard Thibeault, Union Nationale (1936–1939)
4. Joseph-Achille Francoeur, Liberal (1939–1948)
5. Gérard Thibeault, Union Nationale (1948–1962)
6. Jean-Baptiste Crépeau, Liberal (1962–1966)

== Election results ==
1962 Quebec general election
Party	Candidate	Votes	%	±%
Liberal	Jean-Baptiste Crépeau	16,992	54.07	+5.53
Union Nationale	Gérard Thibeault	13,670	43.50	-7.96
Independent Lib.	Réal Clouette	764	2.43	-

1960 Quebec general election
Party	Candidate	Votes	%	±%
Union Nationale	Gérard Thibeault	16,423	51.46	-8.57
Liberal	Jean-Baptiste Crépeau	15,494	48.54	+10.67

1956 Quebec general election
Party	Candidate	Votes	%	±%
Union Nationale	Gérard Thibeault	18,165	60.03	+8.15
Liberal	Georges C. Lachance	11,460	37.87	-3.78
Labor–Progressive	Henri Gagnon	383	1.27	-
Social Democratic	Marie-Ange Gill	162	0.54	-2.79
Canadian Labour	John Monk	89	0.29	-

1952 Quebec general election
Party	Candidate	Votes	%	±%
Union Nationale	Gérard Thibeault	16,280	51.88	-5.83
Liberal	Ruben Lévesque	13,069	41.65	+4.78
CCF	James Doyle	1,044	3.33	-
Independent Lib.	Raymond Lévesque	89	0.29	-

1948 Quebec general election
Party	Candidate	Votes	%	±%
Union Nationale	Gérard Thibeault	17,844	57.71	+22.73
Liberal	Joseph-Achille Francoeur	11,400	36.87	-2.91
Union des électeurs	Lucien-Octave Samson	1,347	4.36	-
Independent Lib.	Émile Naud	337	1.07	-

1944 Quebec general election
Party	Candidate	Votes	%	±%
Liberal	Joseph-Achille Francoeur	12,977	39.78	-13.99
Union Nationale	Édouard Asselin	11,411	34.98	+2.24
Bloc populaire	J. Honoré Désy	8,235	25.24	-

1939 Quebec general election
Party	Candidate	Votes	%	±%
Liberal	Joseph-Achille Francoeur	6,215	53.77	+13.94
Union Nationale	Gérard Thibeault	3,784	32.74	-25.57
ALN	Paul Gouin	1,524	13.19	-
Independent U.N.	Antonio Vermette	35	0.30	-

1936 Quebec general election
Party	Candidate	Votes	%	±%
Union Nationale	Gérard Thibeault	9,340	58.31	-
Liberal	J. Euclide-Eugène Lefrançois	6,830	39.83	-10.22
Independent U.N.	Lucien Duchaîne	299	1.87	-

1935 Quebec general election
Party	Candidate	Votes	%	±%
Liberal	Anatole Plante	9,071	50.05	-9.40
ALN	Calixte Cormier	8,295	45.77	-
Independent Lib.	J. Odilon Boiteau	757	4.18	-

1931 Quebec general election
Party	Candidate	Votes	%	±%
Liberal	Anatole Plante	9,513	59.45	+8.34
Conservative	Joseph-Eugène Gagné	6,311	39.44	-9.45
Independent	Harry Blanshay	177	1.11	-

1927 Quebec general election
Party	Candidate	Votes	%	±%
Liberal	Anatole Plante	5,066	51.11	+20.15
Conservative	Adolphe L’Archevêque	4,837	48.89	-9.01

1923 Quebec general election
Party	Candidate	Votes	%
Conservative	Adolphe L’Archevêque	4,807	57.90
Liberal	Louis-Georges-Arthur Lapointe	2,570	30.96
Labour	Narcisse Arcand	925	11.14
