= Vaudreuil-Soulanges (provincial electoral district) =

Coordinates: 45.37°N 74.19°W

Quebec electoral district

Defunct provincial electoral district
- Legislature: National Assembly of Quebec
- District created: 1939
- District abolished: 1988
- First contested: 1939
- Last contested: 1985

Vaudreuil-Soulanges was a provincial electoral district in the Montérégie region of Quebec, Canada.

It was created for the 1939 election from parts of Vaudreuil and Soulanges electoral districts. Its final election was in 1985. It disappeared in the 1989 election and its successor electoral districts were the re-created Vaudreuil and the newly created Salaberry-Soulanges.

== Members of the Legislative Assembly / National Assembly ==
Legislature	Years	Member	Party
Riding created from Vaudreuil and Soulanges
21st	1939–1944	Alphide Sabourin	Liberal
22nd	1944–1948	Alphide Sabourin	Liberal
23rd	1948–1952	Joseph-Édouard Jeannotte	Union Nationale
24th	1952–1956	Joseph-Édouard Jeannotte	Union Nationale
25th	1956–1957	Joseph-Édouard Jeannotte	Union Nationale
25th	1957–1960	Loyola Schmidt	Union Nationale
26th	1960–1962	Paul Gérin-Lajoie	Liberal
27th	1962–1966	Paul Gérin-Lajoie	Liberal
28th	1966–1969	Paul Gérin-Lajoie	Liberal
28th	1969–1970	Francis-Édouard Belliveau	Union Nationale
29th	1970–1973	Paul Phaneuf	Liberal
30th	1973–1976	Paul Phaneuf	Liberal
31st	1976–1981	Louise Sauvé Cuerrier	Parti Québécois
32nd	1981–1985	Daniel Johnson Jr.	Liberal
33rd	1985–1989	Daniel Johnson Jr.	Liberal
Dissolved into Vaudreuil and Salaberry-Soulanges

== Election results ==
1970 Quebec general election
Party	Candidate	Votes	%	±%
Liberal	Paul Phaneuf	11,841	50.12	−3.05
Union Nationale	François-Édouard Belliveau	6,389	27.04	−13.56
Parti Québécois	A.-Léo Bédard	4,183	17.71	–
Ralliement créditiste	André Dussault	1,158	4.90	–
Crédit social uni	Joseph Ranger	53	0.22	–
Total valid votes		23,624	98.61	–
Rejected and declined votes		333	1.39	–
Turnout		23,957	84.88	+2.98
Electors on the lists		28,224	–	–
Liberal hold		Swing		+5.26
Source: Rapport du président général des élections, Élections 1970.

Quebec provincial by-election, October 8, 1969
Party	Candidate	Votes	%	±%
Union Nationale	François-Édouard Belliveau	8,075	68.51	+27.91
Ralliement créditiste	Marcel Lessard	3,111	26.39	
Crédit social uni	Joseph Ranger	601	5.10	
Total valid votes		11,787	93.41	–
Rejected and declined votes		831	6.59	–
Turnout		12,618	46.66	-33.24
Electors on the lists		27,044	–	–
Source: Official Results, Government of Quebec

1966 Quebec general election
Party	Candidate	Votes	%
Liberal	Paul Gérin-Lajoie	11,120	53.17
Union Nationale	Aimé Grandmaison	8,490	40.60
Independent	Jean-Paul Laflèche	713	3.41
RIN	Louis Gravel	494	2.36
Ralliement national	Régent Millette	96	0.46
Total valid votes		20,913	100.00
Rejected and declined ballots		280	
Turnout		21,193	81.90
Electors on the lists		25,878	
