= 1948 Quebec general election =

Canadian provincial election

- July 28, 1948

92 seats in the 23rd Legislative Assembly of Quebec 47 seats were needed for a majority
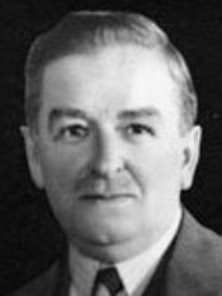

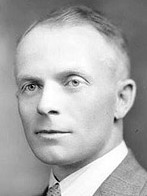
	First party	Second party
Leader	Maurice Duplessis	Adélard Godbout
Party	Union Nationale	Liberal
Leader since	June 20, 1936	June 11, 1936
Leader's seat	Trois-Rivières	L'Islet (defeated)
Last election	48 seats, 38.02%	37 seats, 39.35%
Seats won	82	8
Seat change	▲34	▼29
Popular vote	775,747	547,478
Percentage	51.24%	36.17%
Swing	▲13.22%	▼3.18%
Premier before election
Maurice Duplessis
Union Nationale
Premier after election
Maurice Duplessis
Union Nationale

The 1948 Quebec general election was held on July 28, 1948, to elect members of the Legislative Assembly of the province of Quebec, Canada. The incumbent Union Nationale, led by Maurice Duplessis, won re-election, defeating the Quebec Liberal Party, led by Adélard Godbout.

This was the third time (and the second in a row) that Duplessis led his party to a general election victory.

It was Godbout's third (and final) loss to Duplessis in a general election, and the second in a row. He had won one victory against Duplessis years earlier in the 1939 election. In this election, the Liberals fared particularly poorly, reduced to only 8 seats, although their share of the popular vote was around 36%.

== Adjustment of representation ==
The Legislative Assembly was expanded from 91 to 92 members, as a consequence of Charlevoix—Saguenay no longer returning a joint member, separate members being elected from Charlevoix and Saguenay.

== Campaign ==
The Union des électeurs fielded candidates in all 92 ridings, with 71 becoming, at minimum, three-way contests between them, the UN and the Liberals:

Riding contests, by number of candidates (1948)
Candidates	UN	Lib	UdE	CCF	Ind	I-UN	Lab-Pr	I-Lib	Lab	I-CCF	Total
3	70	71	71		1						213
4	13	13	13	3	6			3	1		52
5	4	4	4	1	3			3		1	20
6	2	2	2	1	3	1		1			12
7	2	2	2	1	3	2	1	1			14
Total	91	92	92	6	16	3	1	8	1	1	311

== Results ==
Elections to the Legislative Assembly of Quebec (1948)
Political party	Party leader	MLAs				Votes			
Political party	Party leader	Candidates	1944	1948	±	#	±	%	± (pp)
Union Nationale	Maurice Duplessis	91	48	82	34▲	775,747	270,086▲	51.25	13.22▲
Liberal	Adélard Godbout	92	37	8	29▼	547,478	24,162▲	36.16	3.19▼
Union des électeurs	P. Ernest Grégoire	92	–	–	–	140,050	123,508▲	9.25	8.01▲
Co-operative Commonwealth		7	1	–	1▼	9,016	24,970▼	0.60	1.96▼
Bloc populaire		–	4	–	4▼	did not campaign			
Other candidates									
█ Independent (Note: René Chaloult was reelected as an independent in Québec-Comté, the only riding in which the UN did not field a candidate) (Note: Frank Hanley was elected in Montréal–Sainte-Anne)	–	11	–	2	2▲	23,956	11,190▲	1.58	0.62▲
█ Independent-Nationalist	–	–	1	–	1▼	did not campaign			
█ Independent-Unionist	–	8	–	–	–	8,649	1,874▲	0.57	0.06▲
█ Labor–Progressive	–	1	–	–	–	4,899	2,974▼	0.32	0.27▼
█ Independent-Liberal	–	7	–	–	–	2,968	7,868▼	0.20	0.45▼
█ Labour	–	1	–	–	–	1,098	7,257▼	0.07	0.56▼
█ Independent-CCF	–	1	–	–	–	110	2,905▼	–	0.23▼
█ Candidat du peuple	–	did not campaign							
█ Independent-Bloc	–	did not campaign							
Total		311	91	92		1,513,971		100%	
Rejected ballots						17,928	2,376▲		
Voter turnout						1,531,899	186,388▲	75.22	3.24▲
Registered electors						2,036,576	167,180▲		

=== Vote and seat summaries ===
Ternary plots - shift of electoral support (1944-1948)
1944

1948
Electoral districts identified by colours of winning parties

Popular vote
UN	51.24%
PLQ	36.17%
UdÉ	9.25%
Others	3.34%

Seats summary
UN	89.13%
PLQ	8.70%
Others	2.17%

=== Synopsis of results ===
Results by riding - 1948 Quebec general election
Riding	Winning party						Turnout (Note: including spoilt ballots)	Votes										
Name	1944	Party	Votes	Share	Margin #	Margin %	Turnout	UN	Lib	UdE	CCF	Ind	I-UN	Lab-Pr	I-Lib	Lab	I-CCF	Total
Abitibi-Est	Lib	UN	8,373	42.23%	2,233	11.26%	81.88%	8,373	5,313	6,140	–	–	–	–	–	–	–	19,826
Abitibi-Ouest	UN	UN	5,669	50.90%	2,497	22.42%	87.56%	5,669	2,196	3,172	–	–	100	–	–	–	–	11,137
Argenteuil	Lib	UN	5,488	48.47%	433	3.82%	82.88%	5,488	5,055	779	–	–	–	–	–	–	–	11,322
Arthabaska	Lib	UN	8,368	54.83%	3,222	21.11%	88.03%	8,368	5,146	1,749	–	–	–	–	–	–	–	15,263
Bagot	Lib	UN	5,220	59.53%	1,925	21.95%	88.78%	5,220	3,295	254	–	–	–	–	–	–	–	8,769
Beauce	BP	UN	12,571	58.94%	8,012	37.57%	88.57%	12,571	4,559	4,197	–	–	–	–	–	–	–	21,327
Beauharnois	BP	UN	9,929	63.35%	5,923	37.79%	82.02%	9,929	4,006	1,738	–	–	–	–	–	–	–	15,673
Bellechasse	Lib	UN	5,027	48.48%	781	7.53%	83.49%	5,027	4,246	1,096	–	–	–	–	–	–	–	10,369
Berthier	Lib	UN	5,952	51.49%	410	3.55%	89.11%	5,952	5,542	66	–	–	–	–	–	–	–	11,560
Bonaventure	UN	UN	8,384	50.99%	715	4.35%	84.86%	8,384	7,669	137	–	–	252	–	–	–	–	16,442
Brome	UN	UN	3,977	60.09%	1,484	22.42%	83.39%	3,977	2,493	148	–	–	–	–	–	–	–	6,618
Chambly	Lib	UN	12,197	52.04%	3,499	14.93%	73.78%	12,197	8,698	869	–	661	1,014	–	–	–	–	23,439
Champlain	UN	UN	11,465	68.52%	7,332	43.82%	86.46%	11,465	4,133	1,135	–	–	–	–	–	–	–	16,733
Charlevoix	New	UN	6,078	54.45%	2,014	18.04%	84.80%	6,078	4,064	961	–	–	59	–	–	–	–	11,162
Châteauguay	Lib	UN	4,277	54.46%	803	10.23%	83.82%	4,277	3,474	102	–	–	–	–	–	–	–	7,853
Chicoutimi	UN	UN	23,602	57.82%	13,806	33.82%	85.69%	23,602	7,424	9,796	–	–	–	–	–	–	–	40,822
Compton	Lib	UN	5,593	53.21%	1,987	18.90%	82.05%	5,593	3,606	1,312	–	–	–	–	–	–	–	10,511
Deux-Montagnes	UN	UN	5,638	62.64%	2,431	27.01%	83.52%	5,638	3,207	155	–	–	–	–	–	–	–	9,000
Dorchester	UN	UN	9,345	61.53%	4,504	29.65%	87.45%	9,345	4,841	1,002	–	–	–	–	–	–	–	15,188
Drummond	UN	UN	10,016	55.09%	5,289	29.09%	79.24%	10,016	4,727	3,438	–	–	–	–	–	–	–	18,181
Frontenac	UN	UN	6,948	56.30%	3,898	31.59%	88.13%	6,948	3,050	2,343	–	–	–	–	–	–	–	12,341
Gaspé-Nord	UN	Lib	3,572	44.95%	213	2.68%	91.81%	3,359	3,572	97	–	918	–	–	–	–	–	7,946
Gaspé-Sud	UN	UN	8,002	60.98%	3,034	23.12%	83.12%	8,002	4,968	152	–	–	–	–	–	–	–	13,122
Gatineau	Lib	UN	6,649	52.34%	1,104	8.69%	78.56%	6,649	5,545	510	–	–	–	–	–	–	–	12,704
Hull	UN	UN	12,036	65.60%	6,499	35.42%	78.23%	12,036	5,537	774	–	–	–	–	–	–	–	18,347
Huntingdon	Lib	UN	3,453	56.54%	879	14.39%	83.64%	3,453	2,574	80	–	–	–	–	–	–	–	6,107
Iberville	UN	UN	3,369	59.55%	1,344	23.76%	86.71%	3,369	2,025	228	–	35	–	–	–	–	–	5,657
Îles-de-la-Madeleine	UN	UN	2,442	58.14%	723	17.21%	91.59%	2,442	1,719	39	–	–	–	–	–	–	–	4,200
Jacques-Cartier	Lib	Lib	14,524	49.59%	4,074	13.91%	66.06%	10,450	14,524	1,088	–	–	3,225	–	–	–	–	29,287
Joliette	UN	UN	10,482	64.99%	5,030	31.19%	86.46%	10,482	5,452	195	–	–	–	–	–	–	–	16,129
Kamouraska	Lib	UN	5,519	49.89%	454	4.10%	83.56%	5,519	5,065	479	–	–	–	–	–	–	–	11,063
L'Assomption	UN	UN	5,971	62.32%	2,729	28.48%	84.56%	5,971	3,242	233	–	–	–	–	135	–	–	9,581
L'Islet	Lib	UN	4,374	45.04%	40	0.41%	85.92%	4,374	4,334	1,004	–	–	–	–	–	–	–	9,712
Labelle	UN	UN	6,694	64.07%	4,127	39.50%	86.60%	6,694	2,567	1,187	–	–	–	–	–	–	–	10,448
Lac-Saint-Jean	Lib	UN	6,277	55.12%	1,661	14.59%	93.33%	6,277	4,616	494	–	–	–	–	–	–	–	11,387
Laval	Lib	UN	29,043	63.36%	15,582	33.99%	67.94%	29,043	13,461	3,033	–	–	–	–	300	–	–	45,837
Laviolette	UN	UN	8,612	54.05%	4,466	28.03%	79.84%	8,612	4,146	3,176	–	–	–	–	–	–	–	15,934
Lévis	UN	UN	10,322	52.41%	4,512	22.91%	85.06%	10,322	5,810	3,561	–	–	–	–	–	–	–	19,693
Lotbinière	Lib	UN	5,900	49.22%	668	5.57%	89.78%	5,900	5,232	854	–	–	–	–	–	–	–	11,986
Maisonneuve	UN	UN	18,493	52.70%	5,128	14.61%	66.51%	18,493	13,365	2,744	486	–	–	–	–	–	–	35,088
Maskinongé	UN	UN	5,184	55.68%	1,124	12.07%	91.60%	5,184	4,060	67	–	–	–	–	–	–	–	9,311
Matane	UN	UN	9,405	57.40%	3,069	18.73%	87.73%	9,405	6,336	643	–	–	–	–	–	–	–	16,384
Matapédia	UN	UN	6,039	47.00%	776	6.04%	87.62%	6,039	5,263	1,547	–	–	–	–	–	–	–	12,849
Mégantic	UN	UN	9,787	51.04%	3,110	16.22%	89.39%	9,787	6,677	2,710	–	–	–	–	–	–	–	19,174
Missisquoi	Lib	UN	5,899	53.75%	1,086	9.90%	82.83%	5,899	4,813	263	–	–	–	–	–	–	–	10,975
Montcalm	UN	UN	4,645	59.04%	1,466	18.63%	86.12%	4,645	3,179	43	–	–	–	–	–	–	–	7,867
Montmagny	Lib	UN	5,284	49.81%	702	6.62%	85.41%	5,284	4,582	742	–	–	–	–	–	–	–	10,608
Montmorency	Lib	UN	4,018	43.88%	245	2.68%	87.87%	4,018	3,773	1,365	–	–	–	–	–	–	–	9,156
Montréal–Jeanne-Mance	Lib	UN	21,456	55.28%	6,491	16.72%	62.55%	21,456	14,965	1,424	970	–	–	–	–	–	–	38,815
Montréal-Laurier	BP	UN	17,234	58.65%	7,176	24.42%	65.40%	17,234	10,058	1,236	–	–	–	–	855	–	–	29,383
Montréal-Mercier	Lib	UN	17,844	57.71%	6,444	20.84%	60.23%	17,844	11,400	1,347	–	–	–	–	331	–	–	30,922
Montréal–Notre-Dame-de-Grâce	Lib	Lib	18,834	76.13%	13,237	53.50%	53.01%	5,597	18,834	309	–	–	–	–	–	–	–	24,740
Montréal-Outremont	Lib	Lib	15,115	70.29%	9,137	42.49%	49.32%	5,978	15,115	412	–	–	–	–	–	–	–	21,505
Montréal–Saint-Henri	UN	UN	17,754	53.83%	6,340	19.22%	68.85%	17,754	11,414	1,625	1,779	–	166	–	246	–	–	32,984
Montréal–Saint-Jacques	UN	UN	12,328	60.56%	6,404	31.46%	61.71%	12,328	5,924	1,008	–	–	–	–	–	1,098	–	20,358
Montréal–Saint-Louis	Lib	Lib	11,032	38.37%	646	2.25%	49.83%	10,386	11,032	845	1,593	–	–	4,899	–	–	–	28,755
Montréal–Sainte-Anne	Lib	Ind	8,216	42.10%	1,771	9.07%	56.27%	2,632	6,445	556	366	8,398	1,120	–	–	–	–	19,517
Montréal–Sainte-Marie	UN	UN	16,108	55.48%	7,793	26.84%	61.51%	16,108	8,315	1,639	–	1,873	–	–	1,101	–	–	29,036
Montréal-Verdun	Lib	Lib	12,639	52.74%	6,017	25.11%	57.26%	6,622	12,639	1,052	3,544	–	–	–	–	–	110	23,967
Napierville-Laprairie	UN	UN	7,080	65.01%	3,389	31.12%	87.67%	7,080	3,691	119	–	–	–	–	–	–	–	10,890
Nicolet	UN	UN	6,810	49.72%	207	1.51%	83.88%	6,810	6,603	285	–	–	–	–	–	–	–	13,698
Papineau	UN	UN	10,129	61.93%	6,149	37.59%	82.86%	10,129	3,980	2,247	–	–	–	–	–	–	–	16,356
Pontiac	Lib	UN	4,723	56.03%	1,346	15.97%	76.61%	4,723	3,377	329	–	–	–	–	–	–	–	8,429
Portneuf	UN	UN	10,506	55.55%	5,224	27.62%	85.44%	10,506	5,282	3,123	–	–	–	–	–	–	–	18,911
Québec-Centre	Lib	UN	8,174	47.66%	404	2.36%	73.52%	8,174	7,770	1,208	–	–	–	–	–	–	–	17,152
Québec-Comté	Nat	Ind	11,807	49.49%	4,261	17.86%	81.97%	–	7,546	4,503	–	11,807	–	–	–	–	–	23,856
Québec-Est	Lib	UN	14,998	54.17%	6,004	21.68%	80.48%	14,998	8,994	3,696	–	–	–	–	–	–	–	27,688
Québec-Ouest	Lib	UN	7,034	50.35%	844	6.04%	74.43%	7,034	6,190	747	–	–	–	–	–	–	–	13,971
Richelieu	Lib	UN	6,647	47.86%	377	2.71%	84.48%	6,647	6,270	970	–	–	–	–	–	–	–	13,887
Richmond	UN	UN	7,135	50.00%	2,784	19.51%	84.70%	7,135	4,351	2,783	–	–	–	–	–	–	–	14,269
Rimouski	UN	UN	7,819	44.81%	1,439	8.25%	85.62%	7,819	6,380	3,252	–	–	–	–	–	–	–	17,451
Rivière-du-Loup	Lib	UN	9,391	56.90%	2,582	15.64%	89.63%	9,391	6,809	305	–	–	–	–	–	–	–	16,505
Roberval	UN	UN	9,695	55.02%	3,782	21.46%	89.83%	9,695	5,913	2,013	–	–	–	–	–	–	–	17,621
Rouville	UN	UN	4,946	54.78%	992	10.99%	88.04%	4,946	3,954	129	–	–	–	–	–	–	–	9,029
Rouyn-Noranda	CCF	UN	5,245	41.73%	1,183	9.41%	81.09%	5,245	3,263	4,062	–	–	–	–	–	–	–	12,570
Saguenay	New	UN	4,726	41.11%	2,207	19.20%	75.15%	4,726	2,519	1,274	–	264	2,713	–	–	–	–	11,496
Saint-Hyacinthe	UN	UN	7,973	49.20%	1,206	7.44%	79.41%	7,973	6,767	1,465	–	–	–	–	–	–	–	16,205
Saint-Jean	UN	UN	7,535	65.27%	3,948	34.20%	82.78%	7,535	3,587	423	–	–	–	–	–	–	–	11,545
Saint-Maurice	UN	UN	11,830	53.40%	5,491	24.79%	84.98%	11,830	3,983	6,339	–	–	–	–	–	–	–	22,152
Saint-Sauveur	Lib	UN	10,149	46.48%	3,261	14.93%	83.66%	10,149	6,888	4,799	–	–	–	–	–	–	–	21,836
Shefford	UN	UN	9,375	52.28%	2,578	14.38%	83.20%	9,375	6,797	1,760	–	–	–	–	–	–	–	17,932
Sherbrooke	UN	UN	13,818	57.26%	8,307	34.42%	77.15%	13,818	5,511	4,525	278	–	–	–	–	–	–	24,132
Stanstead	BP	UN	6,869	53.57%	2,597	20.25%	71.41%	6,869	4,272	1,681	–	–	–	–	–	–	–	12,822
Témiscamingue	UN	UN	3,374	43.95%	858	11.18%	86.54%	3,374	2,516	1,787	–	–	–	–	–	–	–	7,677
Témiscouata	UN	UN	4,779	45.24%	894	8.46%	87.41%	4,779	3,885	1,900	–	–	–	–	–	–	–	10,564
Terrebonne	UN	UN	16,805	59.94%	7,911	28.22%	83.33%	16,805	8,894	2,337	–	–	–	–	–	–	–	28,036
Trois-Rivières	UN	UN	16,097	76.91%	12,261	58.58%	81.12%	16,097	3,836	997	–	–	–	–	–	–	–	20,930
Vaudreuil-Soulanges	Lib	UN	6,272	55.29%	1,359	11.98%	82.22%	6,272	4,913	158	–	–	–	–	–	–	–	11,343
Verchères	Lib	Lib	3,796	49.97%	346	4.55%	86.48%	3,450	3,796	351	–	–	–	–	–	–	–	7,597
Westmount–Saint-Georges	Lib	Lib	13,947	75.87%	9,879	53.74%	47.94%	4,068	13,947	367	–	–	–	–	–	–	–	18,382
Wolfe	UN	UN	4,205	52.44%	905	11.29%	91.53%	4,205	3,300	513	–	–	–	–	–	–	–	8,018
Yamaska	UN	UN	4,326	62.24%	1,954	28.11%	83.33%	4,326	2,372	253	–	–	–	–	–	–	–	6,951

= open seat
= turnout is above provincial average
= winning candidate was in previous Legislature
= incumbent had switched allegiance
= incumbency arose from byelection gain
= previously incumbent in another riding
= other incumbents renominated
= multiple candidates

=== Analysis ===
Party candidates in 2nd place
Party in 1st place	Party in 2nd place				Total
Party in 1st place	UN	Lib	UDE	Ind-UN	Total
Union Nationale		76	5	1	82
Liberal	8				8
Independent		2			2
Total	8	78	5	1	92

Candidates ranked 1st to 5th place, by party
Parties	1st	2nd	3rd	4th	5th	Total
█ Union Nationale	82	8	1			91
█ Liberal	8	78	6			92
█ Independent	2		1	1	3	7
█ Union des électeurs		5	77	8	2	92
█ Independent UN		1	3	3		7
█ Co-operative Commonwealth			2	4		6
█ Labor–Progressive			1			1
█ Labour			1			1
█ Independent Liberal				5	2	7
█ Independent-CCF					1	1

Resulting composition of the 23rd Quebec Legislative Assembly
Source		Party			
Source		UN	Lib	Ind	Total
Seats retained	Incumbents returned	45	5		50
Seats retained	Incumbent changed allegiance			1	1
Seats retained	Open seats held	1	2		3
Seats changing hands	Incumbents defeated	25	1	1	27
Seats changing hands	Open seats gained	5			5
Seats changing hands	Byelection gains held	4			4
New ridings	Incumbent returned in new seat	1			1
New ridings	New MLA elected	1			1
Total		82	8	2	92

== See also ==
- List of Quebec premiers
- Politics of Quebec
- Timeline of Quebec history
- List of Quebec political parties
- 23rd Legislative Assembly of Quebec
