= 21st Quebec Legislature =

The 21st Legislative Assembly of Quebec was the provincial legislature in Quebec, Canada that existed from October 25, 1939, to August 8, 1944. The Quebec Liberal Party led by Adélard Godbout was the governing party. It was the last term for the Liberals in power until 1960. The Union Nationale were in power for the following four terms.

== Seats per political party ==
- After the 1939 elections

Affiliation	Members
Liberal	70
Union Nationale	15
Independent	1
Total	86
Government Majority	55

== Member list ==
This was the list of members of the Legislative Assembly of Quebec that were elected in the 1939 election:

Name	Party	Riding	First elected / previously elected	No. of terms
Félix Allard	Liberal	Abitibi	1939	1st term
Georges-Étienne Dansereau	Liberal	Argenteuil	1935	3rd term
Wilfrid Girouard	Liberal	Arthabaska	1939	1st term
Cyrille Dumaine	Liberal	Bagot	1935, 1939	2nd term*
Henri-René Renault	Liberal	Beauce	1939	1st term
Delpha Sauvé	Union Nationale	Beauharnois	1935	3rd term
Valmore Bienvenue	Liberal	Bellechasse	1939	1st term
Cléophas Bastien	Liberal	Berthier	1927	5th term
Pierre-Émile Côté	Liberal	Bonaventure	1924, 1939	5th term*
Jonathan Robinson	Union Nationale	Brome	1936	2nd term
Dowina-Évariste Joyal	Liberal	Chambly	1939	1st term
Joseph-Philias Morin	Union Nationale	Champlain	1939	1st term
Edgar Rochette	Liberal	Charlevoix—Saguenay	1927, 1939	4th term*
Roméo Fortin	Liberal	Châteauguay-Laprairie	1939	1st term
Antonio Talbot	Union Nationale	Chicoutimi	1938	2nd term
William James Duffy	Liberal	Compton	1931, 1939	2nd term*
Paul Sauvé	Union Nationale	Deux-Montagnes	1930, 1936	4th term*
Joseph-Damase Bégin	Union Nationale	Dorchester	1935	3rd term
Arthur Rajotte	Liberal	Drummond	1935, 1939	2nd term*
Henri-Louis Gagnon	Liberal	Frontenac	1931, 1939	2nd term*
Perreault Casgrain	Liberal	Gaspé-Nord	1939	1st term
Camille-Eugène Pouliot	Union Nationale	Gaspé-Sud	1936	2nd term
Joseph-Célestin Nadon	Liberal	Gatineau	1939	1st term
Alexis Caron	Liberal	Hull	1935, 1939	2nd term*
James Walker Ross	Liberal	Huntingdon	1939	1st term
Dennis James O'Connor (1941)	Liberal	Huntingdon	1941	1st term
Émile Bonvouloir	Liberal	Iberville	1939	1st term
Hormisdas Langlais	Union Nationale	Îles-de-la-Madeleine	1936	2nd term
Charles-Aimé Kirkland	Liberal	Jacques-Cartier	1939	1st term
Antonio Barrette	Union Nationale	Joliette	1936	2nd term
Léon Casgrain	Liberal	Kamouraska–Rivière-du-Loup	1927	5th term
Albiny Paquette	Union Nationale	Labelle	1935	3rd term
Joseph-Ludger Fillion	Liberal	Lac-Saint-Jean	1931, 1939	2nd term*
Bernard Bissonnette	Liberal	L'Assomption	1939	1st term
François Leduc	Liberal	Laval	1935	3rd term
Edmond Guibord	Liberal	Laviolette	1939	1st term
Joseph-Georges Francoeur	Liberal	Lévis	1939	1st term
Adélard Godbout	Liberal	L'Islet	1929, 1939	4th term*
René Chaloult	Liberal (Note: First elected as a Union Nationale candidate)	Lotbinière	1936	2nd term
René Chaloult	Bloc populaire canadien	Lotbinière	1936	2nd term
René Chaloult	Independent	Lotbinière	1936	2nd term
Joseph-Georges Caron	Liberal	Maisonneuve	1939	1st term
Louis-Joseph Thisdel	Liberal	Maskinongé	1930, 1939	4th term*
Onésime Gagnon	Union Nationale	Matane	1936	2nd term
Joseph Dufour	Liberal	Matapédia	1919, 1939	6th term*
Louis Houde	Liberal	Mégantic	1939	1st term
Tancrède Labbé (1940)	Union Nationale	Mégantic	1935, 1940	3rd term*
Henri A. Gosselin	Liberal	Missisquoi	1939	1st term
Joseph-Odilon Duval	Liberal	Montcalm	1939	1st term
Fernand Choquette	Liberal	Montmagny	1939	1st term
Jacques Dumoulin	Liberal	Montmorency	1939	1st term
Joseph-Émile Dubreuil	Liberal	Montréal–Jeanne-Mance	1939	1st term
Paul Gauthier	Liberal	Montréal-Laurier	1939	1st term
Joseph-Achille Francoeur	Liberal	Montréal-Mercier	1931, 1939	2nd term*
James Arthur Mathewson	Liberal	Montréal–Notre-Dame-de-Grâce	1939	1st term
Henri Groulx	Liberal	Montréal-Outremont	1939	1st term
Francis Lawrence Connors	Liberal	Montréal–Sainte-Anne	1935	3rd term
Thomas Guérin (1942)	Liberal	Montréal–Sainte-Anne	1942	1st term
Camillien Houde	Independent (Note: 1923 and 1928 elected as a Conservative)	Montréal–Sainte-Marie	1923, 1928, 1939	3rd term*
Émile Boucher	Liberal	Montréal–Saint-Henri	1939	1st term
Joseph-Roméo Toupin	Liberal	Montréal–Saint-Jacques	1939	1st term
Maurice Hartt	Liberal	Montréal–Saint-Louis	1939	1st term
Léopold Comeau	Liberal	Montréal-Verdun	1939	1st term
Henri-Napoléon Biron	Liberal	Nicolet	1939	1st term
Roméo Lorrain	Union Nationale	Papineau	1935	3rd term
Edward Charles Lawn	Liberal	Pontiac	1935	3rd term
Lucien Plamondon	Liberal	Portneuf	1939	1st term
Joseph-William Morin	Liberal	Québec-Centre	1939	1st term
François-Xavier Bouchard	Liberal	Québec-Comté	1939	1st term
Oscar Drouin	Liberal	Québec-Est	1928	5th term
Charles Delagrave	Liberal	Québec-Ouest	1935	3rd term
Félix Messier	Liberal	Richelieu-Verchères	1927	5th term
Joseph-Willie Robidoux (1942)	Liberal	Richelieu-Verchères	1942	1st term
Stanislas-Edmond Desmarais	Liberal	Richmond	1923, 1939	4th term*
Louis-Joseph Moreault	Liberal	Rimouski	1923, 1939	5th term*
Georges Potvin	Liberal	Roberval	1939	1st term
Henri-Pascal Panet	Liberal	Rouville	1939	1st term
Télesphore-Damien Bouchard	Liberal	Saint-Hyacinthe	1912, 1923	8th term*
Alexis Bouthillier	Liberal	Saint-Jean–Napierville	1919	7th term
Jean-Paul Beaulieu (1941)	Union Nationale	Saint-Jean–Napierville	1941	1st term
Polydore Beaulac	Liberal	Saint-Maurice	1939	1st term
Wilfrid Hamel	Liberal	Saint-Sauveur	1939	1st term
Charles Munson Bullock	Liberal	Shefford	1939	1st term
John Samuel Bourque	Union Nationale	Sherbrooke	1935	3rd term
Raymond-François Frégeau	Liberal	Stanstead	1939	1st term
Paul-Oliva Goulet	Liberal	Témiscamingue	1939	1st term
Joseph-Alphonse Beaulieu	Liberal	Témiscouata	1935, 1939	2nd term*
Athanase David	Liberal	Terrebonne	1916, 1939	8th term*
Damase Perrier (1940)	Liberal	Terrebonne	1940	1st term
Maurice Duplessis	Union Nationale	Trois-Rivières	1927	5th term
Alphide Sabourin	Liberal	Vaudreuil-Soulanges	1939	1st term
Georges Gordon Hyde	Liberal	Westmount–Saint-Georges	1939	1st term
George Carlyle Marler (1942)	Liberal	Westmount–Saint-Georges	1942	1st term
Thomas Hercule Lapointe	Liberal	Wolfe	1933, 1939	3rd term*
Antonio Élie	Union Nationale	Yamaska	1931	4th term

== Other elected MLAs ==
Other MLAs were elected in by-elections during this term

- Joseph-Tancrède Labbé, Union Nationale, Mégantic, November 19, 1940
- Damase Perrier, Quebec Liberal Party, Terrebonne, November 19, 1940
- Dennis James O'Connor, Quebec Liberal Party, Huntingdon, October 6, 1941
- Jean-Paul Beaulieu, Union Nationale, Saint-Jean-Napierville, October 6, 1941
- Thomas Guérin, Quebec Liberal Party, Montréal-Sainte-Anne, March 23, 1942
- Claude Jodoin, Quebec Liberal Party, Montréal-Saint-Jacques, March 23, 1942
- Joseph-Willie Robidoux, Quebec Liberal Party, Richelieu-Verchères, March 23, 1942
- George Carlyle Marler, Quebec Liberal Party, Westmount-Saint-Georges, March 23, 1942

== Cabinet Ministers ==
- Prime Minister and Executive Council President: Adélard Godbout
- Agriculture: Adélard Godbout
- Colonization: Adélard Godbout (1939-1942), Cléophas Bastien (1942-1944)
- Labour: Edgar Rochette
- Public Works: Télesphore-Damien Bouchard (1939-1942), Georges-Étienne Dansereau (1942-1944)
- Health: Henri Groulx (1939-1941)
- Social Welfare: Henri Groulx (1940-1941)
  - Health and Social Welfare:Henri Groulx (1941-1944)
- Lands, Forests, Hunting and Fishing: Pierre-Émile Côté (1939-1941)
  - Lands and Forests: Pierre-Émile Côté (1941-1942), Wilfrid Hamel (1942-1944)
  - Hunting and Fishing: Pierre-Émile Côté (1941-1942), Valmore Bienvenue (1942-1944)
- Mines and Fisheries: Edgar Rochette (1939-1941)
  - Mines and coastal fisheries: Edgar Rochette (1941-1942)
    - Mines: Edgar Rochette (1942-1944)
- Roads: Télesphore-Damien Bouchard (1939-1944), Georges-Étienne Dansereau (1944)
- Municipal Affairs, Industry and Commerce: Oscar Drouin (1939-1944), Henri-René Renault (1944)
- Attorney General: Wilfrid Girouard (1939-1942), Léon Casgrain (1942-1944)
- Provincial Secretary: Henri Groulx (1939-1940), Hector Perrier (1940-1944)
- Treasurer: James Arthur Matthewson
- Members without portfolios: Frank Lawrence Connors, Georges-Étienne Dansereau (1939-1942), Léon Casgrain (1939-1942), Louis-Joseph Thisdel, Cléophas Bastien (1939-1942), Wilfrid Hamel (1939-1942), Francois-Philippe Brais (1940-1944), Perrault Casgrain (1942-1944), Henri-René Renault (1942-1944), Joseph-Achille Francoeur (1944), Maurice Gingues (1944)

== New electoral districts ==
The electoral map was reformed in 1944 which was used in the upcoming election later that year. Some of the changes included de-mergers of ridings that were created in the previous reform in 1939.

- Abitibi was split into two ned ridings: Abitibi-Ouest and Abitibi-Est.
- Rouyn-Noranda was formed from parts of Témiscamingue.
- The riding of Napierville-Laprairie was recreated after Châteauguay and Laprairie were de-merged as well as Saint-Jean and Napierville which formed Saint-Jean-Napierville in 1939. Châteauguay and Saint-Jean were reformed as individual ridings.
- Richelieu and Verchères, which formed Richelieu-Verchères returned as individual ridings.
- Kamouraska and Rivière-du-Loup which formed Kamouraska-Rivière-du-Loup returned as individual ridings.
