= 1936 Quebec general election =

Canadian provincial election

- August 17, 1936

90 seats in the 20th Legislative Assembly of Quebec 46 seats were needed for a majority
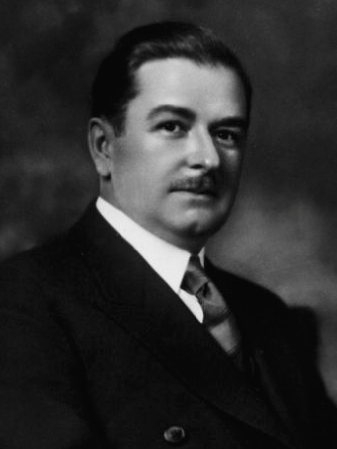

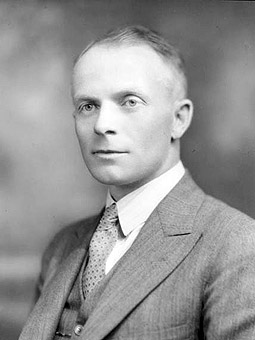
	First party	Second party
Leader	Maurice Duplessis	Adélard Godbout
Party	Union Nationale	Liberal
Leader since	June 20, 1936	June 11, 1936
Leader's seat	Trois-Rivières	L'Islet (lost re-election)
Last election	42 seats, 48.41%^{1}	47 seats, 46.53%
Seats won	76	14
Seat change	▲34	▼33
Percentage	56.88%	39.41%
Swing	▲8.47pp^{1}	▼7.12pp
Premier before election
Adélard Godbout
Liberal
Premier after election
Maurice Duplessis
Union Nationale

The 1936 Quebec general election was held on August 17, 1936, to elect members of the Legislative Assembly of the Province of Quebec, Canada. The Union Nationale, led by Maurice Duplessis, defeated the incumbent Quebec Liberal Party, led by Adélard Godbout.

This marked the end of slightly more than 39 consecutive years in power for the Liberals, who had governed Quebec since the 1897 election.

This 1936 election had been called less than one year after the 1935 election after Liberal premier Louis-Alexandre Taschereau resigned because of a scandal. He was replaced by Godbout as Liberal leader and premier.

This was Duplessis's first term in office. After losing the subsequent 1939 election, he later won four more general elections in a row, and became the dominant politician of his time. It was also the Union Nationale's first election, having been formed from a merger between the Action libérale nationale and the Quebec Conservative Party.

== Campaign ==
Riding contests, by number of candidates (1936)
Candidates	UN	Lib	Ind-G	I-Lib	I-UN	I-Con	CCF	Comm	Ind	CDP	Lab	Total
2	69	68	1									138
3	17	16	1	8	2	2		2	2		1	51
4	4	4		3	1	1	1	1		1		16
Total	90	88	2	11	3	3	1	3	2	1	1	205

== Results ==
Elections to the Legislative Assembly of Quebec (1936)
Political party	Party leader	MLAs				Votes			
Political party	Party leader	Candidates	1935	1936	±	#	±	%	± (pp)
Union Nationale (Note: Comparative results reflect Conservative/ALN merger in 1935.)	Maurice Duplessis	90	42	76	34▲	323,812	61,138▲	56.88	8.47▲
Liberals and allies									
█ Liberal	Adélard Godbout	88	47	14	33▼	224,374	25,212▼	39.41	7.12▼
█ Independent-Government	–	2	–	–	–	3,765	3,150▲	0.66	0.55▲
Other candidates									
█ Independent-Liberal	–	11	1	–	1▼	9,746	11,841▼	1.71	2.31▼
█ Independent-Unionist	–	3	–	–	–	1,928	New	0.34	New
█ Independent-Conservative	–	3	–	–	–	1,870	1,833▲	0.33	0..33▲
█ Co-operative Commonwealth	–	1	–	–	–	1,469	New	0.26	New
█ Communist	–	3	–	–	–	1,045	New	0.18	New
█ Independent	–	2	–	–	–	767	New	0.13	New
█ Candidat du peuple	–	1	–	–	–	470	New	0.08	New
█ Labour	–	1	–	–	–	79	2,159▼	0.01	0.41▼
Total		205	90			569,325		100%	
Rejected ballots						4,930	10,302▼		
Voter turnout						574,255	22,662▲	76.94	0.78▲
Registered electors (contested ridings only)						746,414	22,154▲		
Candidates returned by acclamation				–	3▼				

=== Vote and seat summaries ===
Ternary plots - shift of electoral support (1935-1936)
1935

1936
Electoral districts identified by colours of winning parties

Popular vote
UN	56.88%
PLQ	39.41%
Others	3.71%

Seats summary
UN	84.44%
PLQ	15.56%

=== Synopsis of results ===
Results by riding - 1936 Quebec general election
Riding	Winning party						Turnout (Note: including spoilt ballots)	Votes (Note: Affiliations without candidates gaining 1st or 2nd place results provincewide, or otherwise not receiving more than 1% of the total vote, are grouped under "I-Oth" or "Other")								
Name	1935	Party	Votes	Share	Margin #	Margin %	Turnout	UN	Lib	Ind-G	I-Lib	I-UN	I-Con	Ind	Other	Total
Abitibi	Lib	UN	6,458	66.19%	3,159	32.38%	75.90%	6,458	3,299	–	–	–	–	–	–	9,757
Argenteuil	Lib	Lib	2,179	46.51%	615	13.13%	80.49%	942	2,179	–	–	1,564	–	–	–	4,685
Arthabaska	Lib	UN	3,559	55.63%	720	11.25%	88.52%	3,559	2,839	–	–	–	–	–	–	6,398
Bagot	Lib	Lib	2,101	50.38%	32	0.77%	89.01%	2,069	2,101	–	–	–	–	–	–	4,170
Beauce	ALN	UN	4,788	55.06%	2,087	24.00%	84.22%	4,788	1,207	–	2,701	–	–	–	–	8,696
Beauharnois	Con	UN	2,970	60.70%	1,047	21.40%	78.77%	2,970	1,923	–	–	–	–	–	–	4,893
Bellechasse	Lib	UN	2,780	55.14%	518	10.27%	88.76%	2,780	2,262	–	–	–	–	–	–	5,042
Berthier	Lib	Lib	2,529	50.01%	1	0.02%	90.58%	2,528	2,529	–	–	–	–	–	–	5,057
Bonaventure	Lib	UN	3,876	50.29%	45	0.58%	85.64%	3,876	3,831	–	–	–	–	–	–	7,707
Brome	Lib	UN	1,836	52.16%	152	4.32%	82.36%	1,836	1,684	–	–	–	–	–	–	3,520
Chambly	Lib	UN	3,452	58.39%	992	16.78%	76.86%	3,452	2,460	–	–	–	–	–	–	5,912
Champlain	ALN	UN	4,068	61.38%	1,508	22.75%	86.91%	4,068	2,560	–	–	–	–	–	–	6,628
Charlevoix—Saguenay	Lib	UN	5,080	52.18%	425	4.37%	89.21%	5,080	4,655	–	–	–	–	–	–	9,735
Châteauguay	Lib	UN	1,899	55.04%	348	10.09%	85.94%	1,899	1,551	–	–	–	–	–	–	3,450
Chicoutimi	ALN	UN	8,277	74.59%	5,457	49.18%	78.61%	8,277	2,820	–	–	–	–	–	–	11,097
Compton	Con	UN	3,157	59.75%	1,030	19.49%	80.53%	3,157	2,127	–	–	–	–	–	–	5,284
Deux-Montagnes	Lib	UN	2,127	56.51%	490	13.02%	92.54%	2,127	1,637	–	–	–	–	–	–	3,764
Dorchester	ALN	UN	3,928	58.78%	1,174	17.57%	85.95%	3,928	2,754	–	–	–	–	–	–	6,682
Drummond	Lib	UN	4,086	55.95%	869	11.90%	82.91%	4,086	3,217	–	–	–	–	–	–	7,303
Frontenac	ALN	UN	3,426	64.01%	1,500	28.03%	84.24%	3,426	1,926	–	–	–	–	–	–	5,352
Gaspé-Nord	Lib	UN	1,426	48.22%	174	5.88%	85.95%	1,426	1,252	279	–	–	–	–	–	2,957
Gaspé-Sud	Lib	UN	3,653	57.73%	978	15.46%	87.76%	3,653	2,675	–	–	–	–	–	–	6,328
Gatineau	Lib	UN	3,085	50.52%	64	1.05%	78.49%	3,085	3,021	–	–	–	–	–	–	6,106
Hull	Lib	UN	3,623	55.91%	766	11.82%	62.64%	3,623	2,857	–	–	–	–	–	–	6,480
Huntingdon	Con	UN	1,844	57.63%	488	15.25%	81.88%	1,844	1,356	–	–	–	–	–	–	3,200
Iberville	Lib	Lib	1,292	57.09%	321	14.18%	86.51%	971	1,292	–	–	–	–	–	–	2,263
Îles-de-la-Madeleine	Lib	UN	1,001	50.38%	15	0.75%	86.00%	1,001	986	–	–	–	–	–	–	1,987
Jacques-Cartier	ALN	UN	5,164	59.70%	1,678	19.40%	74.50%	5,164	–	3,486 (Note: Frederick Arthur Monk was previously elected under the ALN banner. Although La Presse identified him as an Independent Liberal, Elections Quebec shows Monk as an independent siding with the Government. The Liberals chose not to run a candidate against him.)	–	–	–	–	–	8,650
Joliette	Lib	UN	3,595	53.97%	529	7.94%	84.38%	3,595	3,066	–	–	–	–	–	–	6,661
Kamouraska	Lib	UN	2,720	51.04%	111	2.08%	87.31%	2,720	2,609	–	–	–	–	–	–	5,329
L'Assomption	ALN	UN	2,080	53.25%	254	6.50%	79.22%	2,080	1,826	–	–	–	–	–	–	3,906
L'Islet	Lib	UN	2,233	50.22%	20	0.45%	85.91%	2,233	2,213	–	–	–	–	–	–	4,446
Labelle	ALN	UN	3,077	72.18%	1,891	44.36%	80.60%	3,077	1,186	–	–	–	–	–	–	4,263
Lac-Saint-Jean	Con	UN	2,544	54.28%	401	8.56%	90.12%	2,544	2,143	–	–	–	–	–	–	4,687
Laval	Con	UN	12,353	67.52%	6,411	35.04%	67.60%	12,353	5,942	–	–	–	–	–	–	18,295
Laviolette	ALN	UN	4,059	64.98%	1,871	29.95%	79.21%	4,059	2,188	–	–	–	–	–	–	6,247
Lévis	ALN	UN	4,053	51.24%	196	2.48%	85.38%	4,053	3,857	–	–	–	–	–	–	7,910
Lotbinière	Lib	UN	2,981	51.11%	129	2.21%	86.21%	2,981	2,852	–	–	–	–	–	–	5,833
Maisonneuve	Con	UN	11,445	68.63%	6,213	37.25%	65.30%	11,445	5,232	–	–	–	–	–	–	16,677
Maskinongé	Lib	UN	2,269	55.38%	441	10.76%	87.04%	2,269	1,828	–	–	–	–	–	–	4,097
Matane	Lib	UN	3,256	55.17%	686	11.62%	86.09%	3,256	2,570	–	76	–	–	–	–	5,902
Matapédia	Lib	UN	3,199	52.97%	359	5.94%	86.07%	3,199	2,840	–	–	–	–	–	–	6,039
Mégantic	ALN	UN	4,627	59.49%	1,649	21.20%	85.78%	4,627	2,978	–	–	–	–	173	–	7,778
Missisquoi	Con	UN	2,854	56.77%	681	13.55%	79.79%	2,854	2,173	–	–	–	–	–	–	5,027
Montcalm	Lib	UN	2,019	56.76%	481	13.52%	88.02%	2,019	1,538	–	–	–	–	–	–	3,557
Montmagny	ALN	UN	2,695	55.70%	552	11.41%	86.59%	2,695	2,143	–	–	–	–	–	–	4,838
Montmorency	Lib	UN	2,149	54.06%	323	8.13%	91.32%	2,149	1,826	–	–	–	–	–	–	3,975
Montréal-Dorion	ALN	UN	5,674	63.20%	2,370	26.40%	66.79%	5,674	3,304	–	–	–	–	–	–	8,978
Montréal-Laurier	ALN	Lib	3,472	50.10%	14	0.20%	58.23%	3,458	3,472	–	–	–	–	–	–	6,930
Montréal-Mercier	Lib	UN	9,340	58.31%	2,960	18.48%	63.62%	9,340	6,380	–	–	299	–	–	–	16,019
Montréal–Saint-Georges	Con	UN	1,399	55.54%	500	19.85%	48.54%	1,399	–	–	221	–	899	–	–	2,519
Montréal–Saint-Henri	ALN	UN	3,622	51.79%	1,300	18.59%	68.25%	3,622	2,322	–	580	–	–	–	470	6,994
Montreal–Saint-Jacques	Con	UN	3,616	58.72%	1,259	20.44%	72.08%	3,616	2,357	–	–	–	–	–	185	6,158
Montréal–Saint-Laurent	Lib	UN	1,201	53.59%	161	7.18%	47.00%	1,201	1,040	–	–	–	–	–	–	2,241
Montréal–Saint-Louis	Lib	Lib	2,024	58.84%	1,251	36.37%	53.46%	773	2,024	–	–	65	–	–	578	3,440
Montreal–Sainte-Anne	I-Lib	Lib	1,673	49.54%	563	16.67%	66.09%	1,110	1,673	–	–	–	–	594	–	3,377
Montréal–Sainte-Marie	ALN	UN	6,410	65.24%	3,276	33.34%	68.85%	6,410	3,134	–	–	–	–	–	282	9,826
Montréal-Verdun	Con	UN	7,502	56.23%	3,626	27.18%	59.59%	7,502	495	–	3,876	–	–	–	1,469	13,342
Napierville-Laprairie	Lib	UN	2,331	51.69%	152	3.37%	88.69%	2,331	2,179	–	–	–	–	–	–	4,510
Nicolet	Lib	UN	3,612	52.86%	661	9.67%	85.88%	3,612	2,951	–	270	–	–	–	–	6,833
Papineau	ALN	UN	4,629	61.60%	1,743	23.19%	75.50%	4,629	2,886	–	–	–	–	–	–	7,515
Pontiac	Lib	Lib	2,091	44.91%	86	1.85%	76.48%	2,005	2,091	–	560	–	–	–	–	4,656
Portneuf	ALN	UN	5,276	64.60%	2,385	29.20%	86.17%	5,276	2,891	–	–	–	–	–	–	8,167
Québec-Centre	ALN	UN	3,837	52.99%	433	5.98%	79.85%	3,837	3,404	–	–	–	–	–	–	7,241
Québec-Comté	Lib	UN	4,651	56.15%	1,019	12.30%	90.40%	4,651	3,632	–	–	–	–	–	–	8,283
Québec-Est	ALN	UN	5,826	61.72%	2,212	23.43%	81.82%	5,826	3,614	–	–	–	–	–	–	9,440
Québec-Ouest	Lib	Lib	1,628	51.44%	282	8.91%	79.20%	1,346	1,628	–	24	–	167	–	–	3,165
Richelieu	Lib	Lib	2,818	57.70%	784	16.05%	85.34%	2,034	2,818	–	32	–	–	–	–	4,884
Richmond	Con	UN	3,460	61.23%	1,269	22.46%	82.28%	3,460	2,191	–	–	–	–	–	–	5,651
Rimouski	Lib	UN	3,491	55.15%	652	10.30%	89.61%	3,491	2,839	–	–	–	–	–	–	6,330
Rivière-du-Loup	Lib	Lib	3,572	50.60%	85	1.20%	88.55%	3,487	3,572	–	–	–	–	–	–	7,059
Roberval	ALN	UN	4,191	61.69%	1,588	23.37%	86.47%	4,191	2,603	–	–	–	–	–	–	6,794
Rouville	Con	UN	2,046	56.26%	455	12.51%	85.82%	2,046	1,591	–	–	–	–	–	–	3,637
Saint-Hyacinthe	Lib	Lib	3,289	50.44%	57	0.87%	87.70%	3,232	3,289	–	–	–	–	–	–	6,521
Saint-Jean	Lib	Lib	2,451	53.29%	303	6.59%	84.80%	2,148	2,451	–	–	–	–	–	–	4,599
Saint-Maurice	ALN	UN	4,635	65.19%	2,160	30.38%	82.07%	4,635	2,475	–	–	–	–	–	–	7,110
Saint-Sauveur	Con	UN	4,816	58.23%	1,362	16.47%	85.76%	4,816	3,454	–	–	–	–	–	–	8,270
Shefford	ALN	UN	3,940	57.73%	1,055	15.46%	84.60%	3,940	2,885	–	–	–	–	–	–	6,825
Sherbrooke	ALN	UN	4,987	60.77%	1,768	21.55%	76.59%	4,987	3,219	–	–	–	–	–	–	8,206
Soulanges	Lib	UN	1,022	44.11%	157	6.78%	88.56%	1,022	865	–	430	–	–	–	–	2,317
Stanstead	ALN	UN	2,980	54.73%	515	9.46%	78.04%	2,980	2,465	–	–	–	–	–	–	5,445
Témiscamingue	ALN	UN	4,200	66.32%	2,067	32.64%	68.46%	4,200	2,133	–	–	–	–	–	–	6,333
Témiscouata	Lib	UN	2,383	54.77%	415	9.54%	92.17%	2,383	1,968	–	–	–	–	–	–	4,351
Terrebonne	Lib	UN	5,279	58.80%	1,659	18.48%	84.37%	5,279	3,620	–	–	–	–	–	79	8,978
Trois-Rivières	Con	UN	5,628	69.31%	3,136	38.62%	83.13%	5,628	2,492	–	–	–	–	–	–	8,120
Vaudreuil	Lib	UN	1,277	42.54%	301	10.03%	84.26%	1,277	749	–	976	–	–	–	–	3,002
Verchères	Lib	Lib	1,843	58.01%	509	16.02%	88.21%	1,334	1,843	–	–	–	–	–	–	3,177
Westmount	Con	UN	8,970	57.75%	3,212	20.68%	48.31%	8,970	5,758	–	–	–	804	–	–	15,532
Wolfe	Lib	UN	2,176	53.78%	306	7.56%	89.80%	2,176	1,870	–	–	–	–	–	–	4,046
Yamaska	Con	UN	2,197	55.85%	460	11.69%	87.88%	2,197	1,737	–	–	–	–	–	–	3,934

= open seat
= turnout is above provincial average
= winning candidate was in previous Legislature
= winning candidate was ALN or Conservative incumbent
= incumbent had switched allegiance
= not incumbent; was previously elected to the Legislature
= incumbency arose from byelection gain
= previously incumbent in another riding
= other incumbents renominated
= previously an MP in the House of Commons of Canada
= multiple candidates

=== Turnout, winning shares and swings ===
Summary of riding results by turnout, vote share for winning candidate, and swing (vs 1935)
Riding and winning party			Turnout		Vote share (Note: Share won by winning candidate, with difference noted from share achieved by the same party in 1935.) (Note: UN shares in 1936 compared to ALN/Conservative shares in 1935)		Swing (Note: Positive indicates improvement to standing of party winning in 1935; negative points to 1935's second-place party being swung to.)	
Riding and winning party			%	Change (pp)	%	Change (pp)	To	Change (pp)
Abitibi	UN	Gain	75.90	-4.95	66.19	21.96	UN	-21.96
Argenteuil	Lib	Hold	80.49	2.88	46.51	-4.80	Lib	11.89
Arthabaska	UN	Gain	88.52	4.40	55.63	24.99	UN	-24.99
Bagot	Lib	Hold	89.01	-0.05	50.38	-7.60	UN	-7.60
Beauce	UN	Hold	84.22	0.77	55.06	-25.35	Lib	-9.82
Beauharnois	UN	Hold	78.77	-3.39	60.70	7.32	UN	7.32
Bellechasse	UN	Gain	88.76	5.54	55.14	9.22	UN	-9.22
Berthier	Lib	Hold	90.58	-1.00	50.01	-8.76	UN	-8.76
Bonaventure	UN	Gain	85.64	3.78	50.29	12.85	UN	-12.85
Brome	UN	Gain	82.36	0.17	52.16	9.44	UN	-9.44
Chambly	UN	Gain	76.86	4.99	58.39	13.34	UN	-13.34
Champlain	UN	Hold	86.91	10.82	61.38	5.17	UN	5.17
Charlevoix-Saguenay	UN	Gain	89.21	12.45	52.18	17.75	UN	-17.75
Châteauguay	UN	Gain	85.94	-0.33	55.04	13.08	UN	-13.08
Chicoutimi	UN	Hold	78.61	2.36	74.59	1.99	UN	1.99
Compton	UN	Hold	80.53	-2.65	59.75	7.48	UN	7.48
Deux-Montagnes	UN	Gain	92.54	0.00	56.51	6.70	UN	-6.70
Dorchester	UN	Hold	85.95	1.58	58.78	2.85	UN	2.85
Dorion	UN	Hold	66.79	-0.19	63.20	7.03	UN	7.03
Drummond	UN	Gain	82.91	3.20	55.95	8.67	UN	-6.10
Frontenac	UN	Hold	84.24	-0.33	64.01	1.82	UN	1.82
Gaspé-Nord	UN	Gain	85.95	2.54	48.22	33.30	N/A (Note: Independent-Liberal candidate finished second in 1935, but did not stand in 1936)	
Gaspé-Sud	UN	Gain	87.76	1.66	57.73	46.71	N/A	
Gatineau	UN	Gain	78.49	14.83	50.52	8.47	UN	-8.47
Hull	UN	Gain	62.64	3.35	55.91	19.72	UN	-12.28
Huntingdon	UN	Hold	81.88	-1.71	57.63	2.83	UN	2.83
Iberville	Lib	Hold	86.51	N/A (Note: Acclamation in 1935)	57.09	N/A		
Îles-de-la-Madeleine	UN	Gain	86.00	-1.20	50.38	30.80	UN	-24.24
Jacques-Cartier	UN	Hold	74.50	1.34	59.70	2.86	UN	2.86
Joliette	UN	Gain	84.38	-2.41	53.97	7.29	UN	-7.29
Kamouraska	UN	Gain	87.31	3.32	51.04	8.31	UN	-8.31
Labelle	UN	Hold	80.60	-0.20	72.18	9.25	UN	9.25
Lac-Saint-Jean	UN	Hold	90.12	3.22	54.28	3.68	UN	3.68
L'Assomption	UN	Hold	79.22	-10.08	53.25	2.45	UN	2.45
Laurier	Lib	Gain	58.23	-1.92	50.10	27.53	N/A (Note: Labour candidate finished second in 1935, but did not stand in 1936)	
Laval	UN	Hold	67.60	-1.90	67.52	13.90	UN	11.13
Laviolette	UN	Hold	79.21	6.58	64.98	3.98	UN	3.98
Lévis	UN	Hold	85.38	-0.80	51.24	8.91	N/A	
L'Islet	UN	Gain	85.91	4.58	50.22	9.54	UN	-9.54
Lotbinière	UN	Gain	86.21	8.54	51.11	31.69	UN	-31.69
Maisonneuve	UN	Hold	65.30	0.04	68.63	12.29	UN	10.37
Maskinongé	UN	Gain	87.04	9.00	55.38	19.58	UN	-19.58
Matane	UN	Gain	86.09	13.96	55.17	12.70	UN	-13.34
Matapédia	UN	Gain	86.07	-0.64	52.97	3.83	UN	-3.83
Mégantic	UN	Hold	85.78	1.18	59.49	0.42	UN	1.54
Mercier	UN	Gain	63.62	-7.68	58.31	12.54	UN	-11.38
Missisquoi	UN	Hold	79.79	-3.85	56.77	3.54	UN	2.01
Montcalm	UN	Gain	88.02	2.85	56.76	9.53	UN	-9.53
Montmagny	UN	Hold	86.59	2.71	55.70	3.19	UN	3.19
Montmorency	UN	Gain	91.32	0.90	54.06	10.33	UN	-10.33
Napierville-Laprairie	UN	Gain	88.69	0.00	51.69	18.70	UN	-14.56
Nicolet	UN	Gain	85.88	6.06	52.86	7.28	UN	-9.25
Papineau	UN	Hold	75.50	2.38	61.60	4.87	UN	4.87
Pontiac	Lib	Hold	76.48	8.69	44.91	0.60	Lib	0.15
Portneuf	UN	Hold	86.17	1.68	64.60	8.28	UN	8.05
Québec-Centre	UN	Hold	79.85	-0.96	52.99	0.25	UN	0.25
Québec-Comté	UN	Gain	90.40	-0.95	56.15	10.90	UN	-7.56
Québec-Est	UN	Hold	81.82	-2.31	61.72	4.11	UN	4.11
Québec-Ouest	Lib	Hold	79.20	-2.52	51.44	-7.00	UN	-3.98
Richelieu	Lib	Hold	85.34	N/A	57.70	N/A		
Richmond	UN	Hold	82.28	-0.95	61.23	5.64	UN	5.64
Rimouski	UN	Gain	89.61	10.07	55.15	8.64	UN	-8.64
Rivière-du-Loup	Lib	Hold	88.55	4.01	50.60	-8.66	UN	-8.66
Roberval	UN	Hold	86.47	4.88	61.69	1.13	Lib	-1.26
Rouville	UN	Hold	85.82	-1.34	56.26	3.17	UN	3.17
Saint-Georges	UN	Hold	48.54	-1.36	55.54	0.00	UN	22.23
Saint-Henri	UN	Hold	68.25	1.16	51.79	16.75	UN	8.37
Saint-Hyacinthe	Lib	Hold	87.70	1.58	50.44	-3.24	UN	-3.24
Saint-Jacques	UN	Hold	72.08	-0.41	58.72	8.34	UN	9.84
Saint-Jean	Lib	Hold	84.80	5.25	53.29	-9.86	N/A (Note: Opposition-Liberal candidate finished second in 1935, but did not stand in 1936)	
Saint-Laurent	UN	Gain	47.00	-47.25	53.59	30.31	UN	-30.31
Saint-Louis	Lib	Hold	53.46	N/A	58.84	N/A		
Saint-Maurice	UN	Hold	82.07	0.02	65.19	5.47	UN	5.47
Saint-Sauveur	UN	Hold	85.76	-0.04	58.23	7.73	UN	1.70
Sainte-Anne	Lib	Gain	66.09	0.97	49.54	19.80	N/A (Note: Francis Lawrence Connors won as an Independent-Liberal in 1935, but ran as a Liberal and won in 1936)	
Sainte-Marie	UN	Hold	68.85	2.73	65.24	15.31	UN	14.79
Shefford	UN	Hold	84.60	-0.69	57.73	4.43	UN	4.43
Sherbrooke	UN	Hold	76.59	1.53	60.77	0.10	UN	0.10
Soulanges	UN	Gain	88.56	2.81	44.11	1.77	UN	-11.05
Stanstead	UN	Hold	78.04	0.82	54.73	1.75	UN	1.75
Témiscamingue	UN	Hold	68.46	-1.64	66.32	12.69	UN	4.03
Témiscouata	UN	Gain	92.17	5.14	54.77	8.02	UN	-8.02
Terrebonne	UN	Gain	84.37	-1.11	58.80	N/A (Note: 1935 election was contested and overturned; result determined by Returning Officer alone)		
Trois-Rivières	UN	Hold	83.13	-3.57	69.31	12.28	UN	12.28
Vaudreuil	UN	Gain	84.26	-0.40	42.54	15.06	Ind-Lib	-4.86
Verchères	Lib	Hold	88.21	-2.66	58.01	-6.49	UN	-6.49
Verdun	UN	Hold	59.59	1.06	56.23	7.17	UN	14.91
Westmount	UN	Hold	48.31	1.91	57.75	2.00	UN	4.59
Wolfe	UN	Gain	89.80	1.53	53.78	5.67	UN	-5.67
Yamaska	UN	Hold	87.88	-4.06	55.85	3.45	UN	3.45

=== Changes in party shares ===
Share change analysis by party and riding (1936 vs 1935)
Riding	Liberals (and allies) (Note: Frederick Arthur Monk was previously elected under the ALN banner in Jacques-Cartier, but campaigned as an independent in 1936. The Liberals chose not to run a candidate against him.)		UN (Note: compared to ALN/Conservative shares in 1935)		Ind-Lib	
Riding	%	Change (pp)	%	Change (pp)	%	Change (pp)
Abitibi	33.81	-21.96	66.19	21.96		
Argenteuil	46.51	-4.80	20.11	-28.59		
Arthabaska	44.37	-24.99	55.63	24.99		
Bagot	50.38	-7.60	49.62	7.60		
Beauce	13.88	-5.71	55.06	-25.35	31.06 (Note: Vital Cliche was elected as an ALN MLA in 1935.)	31.06
Beauharnois	39.30	-7.32	60.70	7.32		
Bellechasse	44.86	-9.22	55.14	9.22		
Berthier	50.01	-8.76	49.99	8.76		
Bonaventure	49.71	-12.85	50.29	12.85		
Brome	47.84	-9.44	52.16	9.44		
Chambly	41.61	-13.34	58.39	13.34		
Champlain	38.62	-5.17	61.38	5.17		
Charlevoix-Saguenay	47.82	-17.75	52.18	17.75		
Châteauguay	44.96	-13.08	55.04	13.08		
Chicoutimi	25.41	-1.99	74.59	1.99		
Compton	40.25	-7.48	59.75	7.48		
Deux-Montagnes	43.49	-6.70	56.51	6.70		
Dorchester	41.22	-2.85	58.78	2.85		
Dorion	36.80	-7.03	63.20	7.03		
Drummond	44.05	-3.52	55.95	8.67	–	-5.15
Frontenac	35.99	-1.82	64.01	1.82		
Gaspé-Nord	42.34	-1.93	48.22	33.30	–	-40.81
Gaspé-Sud	42.27	-8.15	57.73	46.71	–	-29.02
Gatineau	49.48	-8.47	50.52	8.47		
Hull	44.09	-4.84	55.91	19.72	–	-14.87
Huntingdon	42.38	-2.83	57.63	2.83		
Iberville	57.09		42.91			
Îles-de-la-Madeleine	49.62	-17.67	50.38	30.80	–	-13.13
Jacques-Cartier	40.30	-2.86	59.70	2.86		
Joliette	46.03	-7.29	53.97	7.29		
Kamouraska	48.96	-8.31	51.04	8.31		
Labelle	27.82	-9.25	72.18	9.25		
Lac-Saint-Jean	45.72	-3.68	54.28	3.68		
L'Assomption	46.75	-2.45	53.25	2.45		
Laurier	50.10	27.53	49.90	14.90	–	-19.78
Laval	32.48	-8.37	67.52	13.90	–	-5.53
Laviolette	35.02	-3.98	64.98	3.98		
Lévis	48.76	25.89	51.24	8.91	–	-34.80
L'Islet	49.78	-9.54	50.22	9.54		
Lotbinière	48.89	-31.69	51.11	31.69		
Maisonneuve	31.37	-8.46	68.63	12.29		
Maskinongé	44.62	-19.58	55.38	19.58		
Matane	43.54	-13.99	55.17	12.70	1.29	1.29
Matapédia	47.03	-3.83	52.97	3.83		
Mégantic	38.29	-2.65	59.49	0.42		
Mercier	39.83	-10.22	58.31	12.54	–	-4.18
Missisquoi	43.23	-0.47	56.77	3.54		
Montcalm	43.24	-9.53	56.76	9.53		
Montmagny	44.30	-3.19	55.70	3.19		
Montmorency	45.94	-10.33	54.06	10.33		
Napierville-Laprairie	48.31	-10.43	51.69	18.70	–	-8.27
Nicolet	43.19	-11.23	52.86	7.28	3.95	3.95
Papineau	38.40	-4.87	61.60	4.87		
Pontiac	44.91	0.60	43.06	0.30	12.03	-0.90
Portneuf	35.40	-7.82	64.60	8.28		
Québec-Centre	47.01	-0.25	52.99	0.25		
Québec-Comté	43.85	-4.22	56.15	10.90	–	-6.68
Québec-Est	38.28	-4.11	61.72	4.11		
Québec-Ouest	51.44	-7.00	42.53	0.97	0.76	0.76
Richelieu	57.70		41.65		0.66	
Richmond	38.77	-5.64	61.23	5.64		
Rimouski	44.85	-8.64	55.15	8.64		
Rivière-du-Loup	50.60	-8.66	49.40	8.66		
Roberval	38.31	3.65	61.69	1.13	–	-4.77
Rouville	43.74	-3.17	56.26	3.17		
Saint-Georges	–	-44.46	55.54	0.00	8.77 (Note: Wilfrid-Eldège Lauriault was elected as an ALN MLA in 1935.)	8.77
Saint-Henri	33.20	0.02	51.79	16.75	8.29	-23.50
Saint-Hyacinthe	50.44	-3.24	49.56	3.24		
Saint-Jacques	38.28	-11.34	58.72	8.34		
Saint-Jean	53.29	-9.86	46.71	46.71		
Saint-Laurent	46.41	-30.31	53.59	30.31		
Saint-Louis	58.84		22.47			
Saint-Maurice	34.81	-5.47	65.19	5.47		
Saint-Sauveur	41.77	4.32	58.23	7.73		
Sainte-Anne	49.54	19.80	32.87	11.38	–	-46.25
Sainte-Marie	31.89	-14.26	65.24	15.31		
Shefford	42.27	-4.43	57.73	4.43		
Sherbrooke	39.23	-0.10	60.77	0.10		
Soulanges	37.33	-20.33	44.11	1.77	18.56	18.56
Stanstead	45.27	-1.75	54.73	1.75		
Témiscamingue	33.68	4.64	66.32	12.69	–	-15.62
Témiscouata	45.23	-8.02	54.77	8.02		
Terrebonne	40.32		58.80			
Trois-Rivières	30.69	-12.28	69.31	12.28		
Vaudreuil	24.95	-12.40	42.54	15.06	32.51	-2.67
Verchères	58.01	-6.49	41.99	6.49		
Verdun	3.71	-22.64	56.23	7.17	29.05	4.46
Westmount	37.07	-7.18	57.75	2.00		
Wolfe	46.22	-5.67	53.78	5.67		
Yamaska	44.15	-3.45	55.85	3.45		

= did not field a candidate in 1935
= acclamation or election set aside in 1935
= no candidate in either election

=== Endorsements by Gouin ===
Although not standing as a candidate in the election, Paul Gouin gave a list of candidates he felt were the best qualified to be elected.

Outcome of Gouin endorsements (1936)
Party	Candidate			Result
Party	Riding	Name	In 1935	Result
Union Nationale	Chicoutimi	Arthur Larouche	ALN	✓
Union Nationale	Dorion	Grégoire Bélanger	ALN	✓
Union Nationale	Gaspé-Sud	Camille-Eugène Pouliot	N/A	✓
Union Nationale	Îles-de-la-Madeleine	Hormisdas Langlais	N/A	✓
Union Nationale	L'Assomption	Adhémar Raynault	N/A	✓
Union Nationale	Matane	Onésime Gagnon	N/A	✓
Union Nationale	Matapédia	Ferdinand Paradis	N/A	✓
Union Nationale	Montmorency	Joseph-Félix Roy	N/A	✓
Union Nationale	Napierville-Laprairie	Philippe Monette	N/A	✓
Union Nationale	Papineau	Roméo Lorrain	ALN	✓
Union Nationale	Rimouski	Alfred Dubé	N/A	✓
Union Nationale	Rouville	Laurent Barré	Cons	✓
Union Nationale	Saint-Jean	Jean-Paul Beaulieu	N/A	✗
Union Nationale	Saint-Maurice	Marc Trudel	ALN	✓
Union Nationale	Sainte-Marie	Candide Rochefort	ALN	✓
Union Nationale	Témiscamingue	Nil-Élie Larivière	ALN	✓
Union Nationale	Trois-Rivières	Maurice Duplessis	Cons	✓
Union Nationale	Verdun	Pierre-Auguste Lafleur	Cons	✓
Independent-Liberal	Beauce	Vital Cliche	ALN	✗
Independent-Liberal	Jacques-Cartier	Frederick Arthur Monk	ALN	✗
Independent-Liberal	Saint-Henri	Wilfrid-Eldège Lauriault	ALN	✗
Liberal	Argenteuil	Georges-Étienne Dansereau	Lib	✓
Liberal	Bonaventure	Pierre-Émile Côté	Lib	✗
Liberal	Châteauguay	Louis-Georges-Arthur Lapointe	N/A	✗
Liberal	Frontenac	Albert Choquette	N/A	✗
Liberal	Hull	Alexis Caron	Lib	✗
Liberal	Iberville	Lucien Lamoureux	Lib	✓
Liberal	Laurier	Charles-Auguste Bertrand	N/A	✓
Liberal	L'Islet	Adélard Godbout	Lib	✗
Liberal	Lotbinière	Joseph-Napoléon Francoeur	Lib	✗
Liberal	Maskinongé	Louis-Joseph Thisdel	Lib	✗
Liberal	Nicolet	Alexandre Gaudet	Lib	✗
Liberal	Québec-Ouest	Charles Delagrave	Lib	✗
Liberal	Saint-Jacques	Wilfrid Gagnon	N/A	✗
Liberal	Saint-Laurent	Edward Stuart McDougall	N/A	✗
Liberal	Sherbrooke	Césaire Gervais	N/A	✗
Liberal	Terrebonne	Maurice-Robert Demers	N/A	✗
Liberal	Vaudreuil	Elzéar Sabourin	Lib	✗
Liberal	Verchères	Félix Messier	Lib	✓

= Appointed as a minister in 1936, but not then an MLA

=== Analysis ===
Party candidates in 2nd place
Party in 1st place	Party in 2nd place						Total
Party in 1st place	UN	Lib	Ind-G	Ind-Lib	Ind-UN	Ind-Con	Total
Union Nationale		71	1	3		1	76
Liberal	13				1		14
Total	13	71	1	3	1	1	90

Candidates ranked 1st to 4th place, by party
Parties	1st	2nd	3rd	4th	Total
█ Union Nationale	76	13	1		90
█ Liberal	14	71	2	1	88
█ Independent Liberal		3	7	1	11
█ Independent Conservative		1	2		3
█ Independent UN		1	1	1	3
█ Independent Government		1	1		2
█ Communist			3		3
█ Independent			2		2
█ Co-operative Commonwealth			1		1
█ Labour			1		1
█ Candidat du peuple				1	1

Resulting composition of the 23rd Quebec Legislative Assembly
Source		Party		
Source		UN	Lib	Total
Seats retained	Incumbents returned	35	12	47
Seats retained	Ouster of incumbent changing allegiance	4		4
Seats retained	Open seats held	2		2
Seats changing hands	Incumbents defeated - new MLAs	19	1	20
Seats changing hands	Incumbents defeated - return of members previously elected to Legislature	2		2
Seats changing hands	Incumbents defeated - election of previous MP to the Parliament of Canada	1		1
Seats changing hands	Open seats gained	13		13
Seats changing hands	Incumbent changed allegiance		1	1
Total		76	14	90

== See also ==
- List of Quebec premiers
- Politics of Quebec
- Timeline of Quebec history
- List of Quebec political parties
- 20th Legislative Assembly of Quebec
