= Zénon Lesage =

Canadian politician

Zénon Lesage was a politician Quebec, Canada and a Member of the Legislative Assembly of Quebec (MLA).

== Early life ==
He was born on December 18, 1885, in Sainte-Thérèse, Quebec, and became a physician.

== City Councillor ==
Lesage won a seat to the City Council of Montreal in 1930 against Ernest Poulin, who also was a Liberal member of the provincial legislature. Lesage was re-elected in 1932, 1934 against Poulin, 1936, 1938, 1940 and 1942. He did not run for re-election in 1944.

== Member of the legislature ==
He ran as an Action libérale nationale candidate in the district of Montréal-Laurier in the 1935 provincial election and defeated Poulin. Lesage joined Maurice Duplessis's Union Nationale, but was defeated in 1936 and 1939.

== Death ==
He died on February 4, 1956.

== Footnotes ==
National Assembly of Quebec
Preceded by Ernest Poulin (Liberal)	MLA, District of Montréal-Laurier; 1935–1936	Succeeded by Charles-Auguste Bertrand (Liberal)
