= Verchères (disambiguation) =

Verchères could refer to:

- Verchères, town in Quebec
- Verchères—Les Patriotes, former electoral district
- Chambly—Borduas, former electoral district that previously was named Chambly—Verchères
- Richelieu—Verchères, former electoral district in Canada
- Madeleine de Verchères, colonial woman who led a raid on a fort
- Richelieu-Verchères, former provincial electoral district
- Verchères (federal electoral district), former federal electoral district in Canada
- Verchères (provincial electoral district), former provisional electoral district in Quebec, Canada
