= Louis Lemieux =

Canadian politician and journalist

Member of the National Assembly of Quebec for Saint-Jean
- In office October 1, 2018 – August 27, 2026
- Preceded by: Dave Turcotte
- Succeeded by: Gaétan Bédard

Personal details
- Born: 1957 Quebec City
- Party: Coalition Avenir Québec

Louis Lemieux is a Canadian politician and former journalist, who was elected to the National Assembly of Quebec in the 2018 provincial election. He represented the electoral district of Saint-Jean as a member of the Coalition Avenir Québec. He did not seek re-election in the 2026 general election.

== Electoral record ==
2022 Quebec general election: Saint-Jean
Party	Candidate	Votes	%	±%
Coalition Avenir Québec	Louis Lemieux	21,734	50.65	+11.15
Parti Québécois	Alexandre Girard-Duchaine	8,248	19.22	-11.76
Québec solidaire	Pierre-Luc Lavertu	6,334	14.76	+0.32
Conservative	Dominick Melnitzky	3,603	8.40	+7.53
Liberal	Benjamin Roy	2,565	5.98	-5.66
Climat Québec	Denis Thériault	290	0.68	–
Démocratie directe	Raymond Choquette	133	0.31	–
Total valid votes		42,907	98.35	–
Total rejected ballots		718	1.65	-0.22
Turnout		43,625	69.73	-1.55
Electors on the lists		62,562	–	–
Coalition Avenir Québec hold		Swing		+11.46

2018 Quebec general election: Saint-Jean
Party	Candidate	Votes	%	±%
Coalition Avenir Québec	Louis Lemieux	16,789	39.50	+8.42
Parti Québécois	Dave Turcotte	13,171	30.99	-1.45
Québec solidaire	Simon Lalonde	6,137	14.44	+7.94
Liberal	Vanessa Parent	4,946	11.64	-16.85
Green	Véronique Langlois	694	1.63	–
Conservative	Philippe Perreault	368	0.87	+0.29
Citoyens au pouvoir	Louis St-Jacques	240	0.56	–
New Democratic	Geneviève Ruel	159	0.37	–
Total valid votes		42,504	98.13	
Total rejected ballots		809	1.87	
Turnout		43,313	71.28	-0.39
Eligible voters		60,761		
Coalition Avenir Québec gain from Parti Québécois		Swing		+4.94
Source(s) "Rapport des résultats officiels du scrutin". Élections Québec.
