= Pierre-Auguste Lafleur =

Canadian politician

Member of the Legislative Assembly of Quebec for Montréal-Verdun
- In office 1923–1939
- Preceded by: District created in 1922
- Succeeded by: Joseph-Jean-Léopold Comeau

Personal details
- Born: March 3, 1872 Sainte-Adèle, Quebec
- Died: December 14, 1954 (aged 82) Verdun, Quebec
- Party: Union Nationale

Pierre-Auguste Lafleur (March 3, 1872 – December 14, 1954) was a Canadian politician and a five-term Member of the Legislative Assembly of Quebec.

== Background ==
He was born in Sainte-Adèle, Laurentides on March 3, 1872, and made career in the furniture industry. He married Jennie Veitch in Verdun, Quebec, in 1918.

== City Councillor ==
He served as a city councillor from 1921 to 1933 in Verdun.

== Member of the legislature ==
Lafleur ran as a Conservative candidate in the provincial district of Montréal-Verdun in the 1923 election and won. He was re-elected in the 1927, 1931 and 1935 elections.

He joined Maurice Duplessis's Union Nationale and was re-elected in the 1936 election.

He was defeated in the 1939, 1944 and 1948 elections.

== Death ==
He died on December 14, 1954, in Verdun.
