= Paul Gauthier =

Paul Gauthier is the name of:

- Paul Gauthier (theologian) (1914–2002), French theologian and humanist
- Paul Gauthier (ice hockey) (1915–1984), ice hockey player
- Paul Gauthier (politician) (1901–1957), Canadian politician
- Paul Gauthier (Inktomi), co-founder of Inktomi Corporation
- Paul Gauthier (boccia), Canadian boccia player

== See also ==
- Jean-Paul Gaultier (born 1952), French fashion designer
