= 1944 Quebec general election =

Canadian provincial election

- August 8, 1944

91 seats in the 22nd Legislative Assembly of Quebec 46 seats were needed for a majority
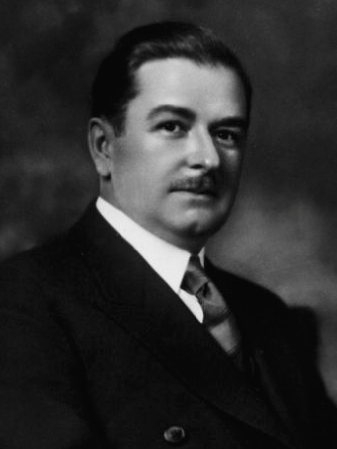

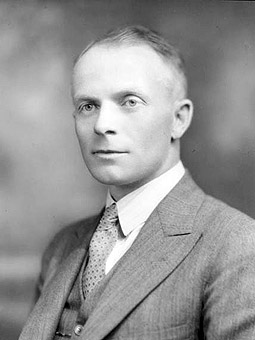

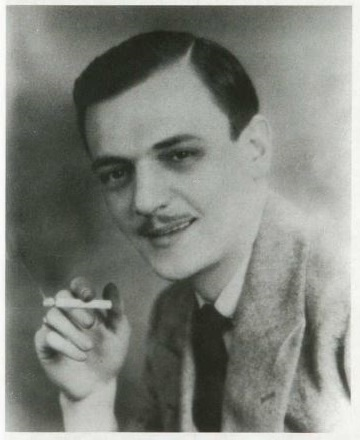
	First party	Second party	Third party
Leader	Maurice Duplessis	Adélard Godbout	André Laurendeau
Party	Union Nationale	Liberal	Bloc populaire
Leader since	June 20, 1936	June 11, 1936	July 6, 1942
Leader's seat	Trois-Rivières	L'Islet	Montréal-Laurier
Last election	15 seats, 39.13%	70 seats, 54.05%	pre-creation
Seats won	48	37	4
Seat change	▲33	▼33	▲4
Popular vote	505,661	523,316	191,564
Percentage	38.02%	39.35%	14.40%
Swing	▼1.11pp	▼14.7pp	▲14.40pp
Premier before election
Adélard Godbout
Liberal
Premier after election
Maurice Duplessis
Union Nationale

The 1944 Quebec general election was held on August 8, 1944 to elect members of the Legislative Assembly of the Province of Quebec, Canada. The Union Nationale, led by former premier Maurice Duplessis, defeated the incumbent Quebec Liberal Party, led by Adélard Godbout. This was the first Quebec provincial election in which women were allowed to vote, having been granted suffrage at the provincial level in 1941 (much later than what had been fully attained at the federal level in 1919).

This election marked Duplessis's comeback after having defeated Godbout in the 1936 election and having lost to him in the 1939 election. Unlike in the 1939 election, when the alcoholic Duplessis was clearly drunk at numerous campaign rallies, le chef had benefited from the time he had spent in an American sanatorium in 1942–1943, where he had sobered up, and in the 1944 election, Duplessis refrained from drinking.

The biggest issue during this election was provincial autonomy. In order to appeal to nationalist voters, Duplessis attacked the incumbent premier, claiming that he was not taking a strong enough stand against Ottawa. He mainly criticized Godbout for agreeing to transfer unemployment insurance from the province to the federal government. He also criticized the Rowell-Sirois Commission for its stance on unemployment insurance and equalization payments.

Another reason Duplessis won the election was by appealing to antisemitic prejudices in Quebec by making the false claim in a violently anti-Semitic speech that the Dominion government together with the Godbout government had made a secret deal with the "International Zionist Brotherhood" to settle 100,000 Jewish refugees left homeless by the Holocaust in Quebec after the war in exchange for Jewish campaign contributions to both the federal and provincial Liberal parties. By contrast, Duplessis claimed that he was not taking any money from the Jews, and if he were elected Premier, he would stop this plan to bring Jewish refugees to Quebec. To further push on the message, the Union Nationale handed out campaign pamphlets warning about the alleged plan to bring 100,000 Jewish refugees to Quebec, which featured a racist and stereotypical depiction of a Jewish person handing bags of money to Godbout while in the background other stereotypically-depicted refugees were ready to descend on la belle province. Through Duplessis's story about the plan to settle 100,000 Jewish refugees in Quebec was entirely false, his story was widely believed in Quebec, and ensured he won the election. Duplessis's biographer Conrad Black argued that Duplessis was in no way personally anti-Semitic, but because the majority of Quebecois were at the time, Duplessis had merely used antisemitism to win the 1944 election. Duplessis won another three elections in a row, for a total of five terms of office (four consecutive), before dying in office in 1959.

In this wartime election, Godbout's support for Canadian Prime Minister William Lyon Mackenzie King in the Conscription Crisis of 1944 may have contributed to his defeat.

The Bloc Populaire won four seats on an anti-conscription platform. More importantly, they siphoned off enough votes from the Liberals to deny them a second term. Even though the Liberals narrowly won the popular vote, massive vote-splitting with the Bloc Populaire allowed the Union Nationals to win a narrow majority of seats.

The Co-operative Commonwealth Federation (predecessor of the New Democratic Party) won one seat. Party member David Côté was elected to the legislature, but in July 1945, he decided to sit as an independent.

== Redistribution of ridings ==
An Act passed before the election increased the number of MLAs from 86 to 91 through the following changes:

Abolished ridings	New ridings
Drawn from parts of other ridings
	Rouyn-Noranda (Note: taken from part of Témiscamingue)
Reorganization of ridings
Châteauguay-Laprairie; Saint-Jean–Napierville	Châteauguay; Napierville-Laprairie; Saint-Jean
Division of ridings
Abitibi	Abitibi-Est; Abitibi-Ouest
Kamouraska–Rivière-du-Loup	Kamouraska; Rivière-du-Loup
Richelieu-Verchères	Richelieu; Verchères

== Campaign ==
Riding contests, by number of candidates (1944)
Candidates	UN	Lib	BP	CCF	UdE	Nat	Ind	I-Lib	Lab	Lab-Pr	I-UN	I-CCF	I-BP	CdP	Total
2	5	4					1								10
3	45	45	40	1		2		1						1	135
4	25	25	24	10	7		5	3			1				100
5	12	12	12	9	3		7		1		2	1	1		60
6	1	1	1	1				1		1					6
7	2	2	2	2	1		2		1	2					14
8	1	1	1	1	1		1	2							8
Total	91	90	80	24	12	2	16	7	2	3	3	1	1	1	333

== Results ==
Elections to the Legislative Assembly of Quebec (1944)
Political party	Party leader	MLAs				Votes			
Political party	Party leader	Candidates	1939	1944	±	#	±	%	± (pp)
Union Nationale (Note: 1939 includes Joseph-Philias Morin (Champlain), who was elected under the Conservative banner and served only one term)	Maurice Duplessis	91	15	48	33▲	505,661	285,259▲	38.02	1.11▼
Liberal	Adélard Godbout	90	69	37	32▼	523,316	221,934▲	39.35	14.15▼
Bloc populaire	André Laurendeau	80	–	4	4▲	191,564	New	14.40	New
Co-operative Commonwealth	Romuald-Joseph Lamoureux (Note: Defeated in Montréal–Saint-Henri. David Côté was elected in Rouyn-Noranda.)	24	–	1	1▲	33,986	31,473▲	2.56	2.11▲
Union des électeurs		12	–	–	–	16,542	New	1.24	New
Action libérale nationale		did not campaign							
Other candidates									
█ Independent	–	16	1	–	1▼	12,766	6,485▲	0.96	0.03▼
█ Nationalist (Note: René Chaloult was elected in Québec-Comté) (Note: results compared against performance under the Parti national banner in 1939)	–	2	1	1	Steady	8,711	5,637▲	0.65	0.10▲
█ Independent-Liberal	–	7	–	–	–	8,656	7,868▲	0.65	0.51▲
█ Labour	–	2	–	–	–	8,355	7,945▲	0.63	0.56▲
█ Labor–Progressive (Note: formerly Communist)	–	3	–	–	–	7,873	7,714▲	0.59	0.56▲
█ Independent-Unionist	–	3	–	–	–	6,775	6,306▲	0.51	0.43▲
█ Independent-CCF	–	1	–	–	–	3,015	New	0.23	New
█ Candidat du peuple	–	1	–	–	–	2,583	New	0.19	New
█ Independent-Bloc	–	1	–	–	–	156	New	0.01	New
Total		333	86	91		1,329,959		100%	
Rejected ballots						15,552	8,218▲		
Voter turnout						1,345,511	774,880▲	71.98	5.02▼
Registered electors (Note: Electorate expanded on adoption of An Act granting to women the right to vote and to be eligible as candidates, S.Q. 1940, c. 7)						1,869,396	1,128,265▲		
Candidates returned by acclamation				–	1▼				

=== Vote and seat summaries ===
Ternary plots - shift of electoral support (1939-1944)
1939

1944
Electoral districts identified by colours of winning parties

Popular vote
PLQ	39.35%
UN	38.02%
BP	14.40%
CCF	2.56%
Others	5.67%

Seats summary
UN	52.75%
PLQ	40.66%
BP	4.40%
CCF	1.10%
Others	1.10%

=== Synopsis of results ===
Results by riding - 1944 Quebec general election
Riding	Winning party						Turnout (Note: including spoilt ballots)	Votes (Note: Affiliations without candidates gaining 1st or 2nd place results provincewide, or otherwise not receiving more than 1% of the total vote, are grouped under "Other")											
Name	1939	Party	Votes	Share	Margin #	Margin %	Turnout	UN	Lib	BP	CCF	UdE	Nat	Ind	I-Lib	Lab	LP	Other	Total
Abitibi-Est	New	Lib	5,410	38.24%	1,434	10.14%	79.76%	3,976	5,410	2,010	889	1,862	–	–	–	–	–	–	14,147
Abitibi-Ouest	New	UN	3,729	38.82%	1,174	12.22%	86.03%	3,729	2,555	1,494	–	1,828	–	–	–	–	–	–	9,606
Argenteuil	Lib	Lib	6,084	61.84%	3,791	38.53%	77.87%	1,461	6,084	2,293	–	–	–	–	–	–	–	–	9,838
Arthabaska	Lib	Lib	5,511	40.80%	33	0.24%	86.01%	5,478	5,511	2,519	–	–	–	–	–	–	–	–	13,508
Bagot	Lib	Lib	3,781	47.78%	127	1.60%	83.39%	3,654	3,781	479	–	–	–	–	–	–	–	–	7,914
Beauce	Lib	BP	5,466	29.30%	164	0.88%	85.91%	5,302	5,099	5,466	–	2,790	–	–	–	–	–	–	18,657
Beauharnois	UN	BP	7,186	45.87%	1,266	8.08%	83.18%	5,920	2,560	7,186	–	–	–	–	–	–	–	–	15,666
Bellechasse	Lib	Lib	4,762	49.72%	545	5.69%	79.16%	4,217	4,762	599	–	–	–	–	–	–	–	–	9,578
Berthier	Lib	Lib	5,138	49.96%	823	8.00%	85.38%	4,315	5,138	832	–	–	–	–	–	–	–	–	10,285
Bonaventure	Lib	UN	6,031	45.03%	1,542	11.51%	73.27%	6,031	1,651	1,223	–	–	–	–	4,489	–	–	–	13,394
Brome	UN	UN	2,860	51.36%	655	11.76%	74.69%	2,860	2,205	503	–	–	–	–	–	–	–	–	5,568
Chambly	Lib	Lib	6,638	42.25%	1,110	7.06%	70.11%	5,528	6,638	2,140	1,406	–	–	–	–	–	–	–	15,712
Champlain	Con	UN	7,632	54.41%	2,494	17.78%	81.92%	7,632	5,138	1,258	–	–	–	–	–	–	–	–	14,028
Charlevoix—Saguenay	Lib	UN	11,173	79.17%	8,234	58.35%	59.07%	11,173	–	–	–	–	–	2,939	–	–	–	–	14,112
Châteauguay	New	Lib	3,128	44.55%	839	11.95%	82.05%	2,289	3,128	1,604	–	–	–	–	–	–	–	–	7,021
Chicoutimi	UN	UN	17,752	50.49%	8,906	25.33%	79.12%	17,752	8,846	6,256	–	2,307	–	–	–	–	–	–	35,161
Compton	Lib	Lib	4,566	49.99%	1,729	18.93%	76.38%	2,837	4,566	1,730	–	–	–	–	–	–	–	–	9,133
Deux-Montagnes	UN	UN	3,599	50.78%	1,509	21.29%	79.15%	3,599	2,090	1,313	–	–	–	–	86	–	–	–	7,088
Dorchester	UN	UN	6,887	52.95%	2,215	17.03%	81.21%	6,887	4,672	1,447	–	–	–	–	–	–	–	–	13,006
Drummond	Lib	UN	6,965	42.39%	1,979	12.04%	84.59%	6,965	4,986	4,481	–	–	–	–	–	–	–	–	16,432
Frontenac	Lib	UN	4,599	41.95%	1,307	11.92%	86.18%	4,599	3,292	1,604	–	1,417	–	52	–	–	–	–	10,964
Gaspé-Nord	Lib	UN	3,198	47.31%	539	7.97%	89.13%	3,198	2,659	150	–	–	–	753	–	–	–	–	6,760
Gaspé-Sud	UN	UN	6,090	53.64%	2,600	22.90%	79.13%	6,090	3,490	–	–	–	–	–	1,773	–	–	–	11,353
Gatineau	Lib	Lib	5,471	49.27%	1,592	14.34%	72.78%	3,879	5,471	942	813	–	–	–	–	–	–	–	11,105
Hull	Lib	UN	9,051	55.49%	4,084	25.04%	76.66%	9,051	4,967	2,293	–	–	–	–	–	–	–	–	16,311
Huntingdon	Lib	Lib	2,865	54.26%	1,114	21.10%	74.22%	1,751	2,865	664	–	–	–	–	–	–	–	–	5,280
Iberville	Lib	UN	1,910	38.81%	426	8.66%	82.43%	1,910	1,484	956	–	–	–	–	572	–	–	–	4,922
Îles-de-la-Madeleine	UN	UN	2,092	55.49%	414	10.98%	90.09%	2,092	1,678	–	–	–	–	–	–	–	–	–	3,770
Jacques-Cartier	Lib	Lib	13,349	52.04%	5,208	20.30%	66.89%	8,141	13,349	4,163	–	–	–	–	–	–	–	–	25,653
Joliette	UN	UN	8,652	61.83%	3,655	26.12%	82.60%	8,652	4,997	344	–	–	–	–	–	–	–	–	13,993
Kamouraska	New	Lib	5,175	52.04%	695	6.99%	77.88%	4,480	5,175	289	–	–	–	–	–	–	–	–	9,944
L'Assomption	Lib	UN	3,522	40.02%	368	4.18%	83.98%	3,522	3,154	–	–	–	2,124	–	–	–	–	–	8,800
L'Islet	Lib	Lib	4,834	55.14%	902	10.29%	81.25%	3,932	4,834	–	–	–	–	–	–	–	–	–	8,766
Labelle	UN	UN	5,517	66.18%	3,678	44.12%	78.83%	5,517	1,839	796	–	–	–	184	–	–	–	–	8,336
Lac-Saint-Jean	Lib	Lib	3,718	38.07%	109	1.12%	89.49%	3,609	3,718	1,944	–	495	–	–	–	–	–	–	9,766
Laval	Lib	Lib	11,642	35.22%	2,511	7.60%	62.20%	7,648	11,642	9,131	–	–	–	–	–	–	–	4,632	33,053
Laviolette	Lib	UN	7,455	55.04%	3,342	24.67%	79.48%	7,455	4,113	1,785	192	–	–	–	–	–	–	–	13,545
Lévis	Lib	UN	8,101	45.94%	921	5.22%	79.79%	8,101	7,180	2,352	–	–	–	–	–	–	–	–	17,633
Lotbinière	Nat	Lib	4,472	41.74%	812	7.58%	83.46%	3,660	4,472	–	–	–	–	–	–	–	–	2,583	10,715
Maisonneuve	Lib	UN	10,584	32.50%	51	0.16%	65.05%	10,584	10,533	8,245	1,380	–	–	–	–	1,824	–	–	32,566
Maskinongé	Lib	UN	4,475	54.98%	1,340	16.46%	85.85%	4,475	3,135	530	–	–	–	–	–	–	–	–	8,140
Matane	UN	UN	8,684	64.07%	4,130	30.47%	85.30%	8,684	4,554	316	–	–	–	–	–	–	–	–	13,554
Matapédia	Lib	UN	4,979	45.14%	678	6.15%	82.20%	4,979	4,301	1,548	–	–	–	201	–	–	–	–	11,029
Mégantic	Lib	UN	9,713	57.22%	2,450	14.43%	87.36%	9,713	7,263	–	–	–	–	–	–	–	–	–	16,976
Missisquoi	Lib	Lib	5,515	57.25%	3,044	31.60%	77.26%	2,471	5,515	1,647	–	–	–	–	–	–	–	–	9,633
Montcalm	Lib	UN	3,079	45.30%	926	13.62%	81.66%	3,079	2,153	1,565	–	–	–	–	–	–	–	–	6,797
Montmagny	Lib	Lib	4,781	55.87%	1,004	11.73%	73.39%	3,777	4,781	–	–	–	–	–	–	–	–	–	8,558
Montmorency	Lib	Lib	3,764	48.42%	1,052	13.53%	80.89%	2,712	3,764	168	–	1,130	–	–	–	–	–	–	7,774
Montréal–Jeanne-Mance	Lib	Lib	11,662	36.45%	1,570	4.91%	64.25%	6,859	11,662	10,092	2,897	–	–	485	–	–	–	–	31,995
Montréal-Laurier	Lib	BP	9,540	34.62%	647	2.35%	62.08%	8,350	8,893	9,540	438	–	–	–	–	–	–	333	27,554
Montréal-Mercier	Lib	Lib	12,977	39.78%	1,566	4.80%	63.23%	11,411	12,977	8,235	–	–	–	–	–	–	–	–	32,623
Montréal–Notre-Dame-de-Grâce	Lib	Lib	20,140	78.13%	17,709	68.70%	56.62%	699	20,140	1,070	2,431	–	–	1,437	–	–	–	–	25,777
Montréal-Outremont	Lib	Lib	17,704	77.18%	15,540	67.74%	56.32%	1,417	17,704	2,164	–	–	–	1,654	–	–	–	–	22,939
Montréal–Saint-Henri	Lib	UN	9,569	36.34%	288	1.09%	61.13%	9,569	9,281	4,752	2,732	–	–	–	–	–	–	–	26,334
Montréal–Saint-Jacques	Lib	UN	11,400	43.11%	1,504	5.69%	56.06%	11,400	9,896	3,860	1,285	–	–	–	–	–	–	–	26,441
Montréal–Saint-Louis	Lib	Lib	9,754	40.72%	2,881	12.03%	60.04%	2,890	9,754	2,421	1,241	–	–	773	–	–	6,873	–	23,952
Montréal–Sainte-Anne	Lib	Lib	13,180	56.61%	8,711	37.42%	53.68%	4,469	13,180	1,659	3,974	–	–	–	–	–	–	–	23,282
Montréal–Sainte-Marie	Ind	UN	9,299	35.34%	1,607	6.11%	57.94%	9,299	7,692	6,766	1,090	–	–	–	521	–	944	–	26,312
Montréal-Verdun	Lib	Lib	8,793	36.62%	2,754	11.47%	64.06%	2,899	8,793	3,263	6,039	–	–	–	–	–	–	3,015	24,009
Napierville-Laprairie	New	UN	3,665	41.47%	415	4.70%	79.39%	3,665	3,250	1,922	–	–	–	–	–	–	–	–	8,837
Nicolet	Lib	UN	5,639	44.48%	708	5.58%	78.54%	5,639	4,931	2,107	–	–	–	–	–	–	–	–	12,677
Papineau	UN	UN	8,842	60.71%	4,773	32.77%	78.58%	8,842	4,069	1,654	–	–	–	–	–	–	–	–	14,565
Pontiac	Lib	Lib	3,667	48.29%	882	11.62%	71.40%	2,785	3,667	–	1,141	–	–	–	–	–	–	–	7,593
Portneuf	Lib	UN	6,489	39.04%	1,550	9.32%	80.70%	6,489	4,879	4,939	160	–	–	–	–	–	–	156	16,623
Québec-Centre	Lib	Lib	8,755	52.47%	2,817	16.88%	69.10%	5,938	8,755	1,487	290	–	–	216	–	–	–	–	16,686
Québec-Comté	Lib	Nat	6,587	34.79%	363	1.92%	79.17%	6,120	6,224	–	–	–	6,587	–	–	–	–	–	18,931
Québec-Est	Lib	Lib	7,370	31.13%	839	3.54%	74.85%	5,734	7,370	2,832	169	986	–	–	–	6,531	56	–	23,678
Québec-Ouest	Lib	Lib	6,006	54.35%	2,505	22.67%	69.70%	3,501	6,006	1,365	179	–	–	–	–	–	–	–	11,051
Richelieu	New	Lib	7,636	55.98%	4,292	31.46%	77.73%	3,344	7,636	2,661	–	–	–	–	–	–	–	–	13,641
Richmond	Lib	UN	5,626	45.03%	282	2.26%	81.48%	5,626	5,344	1,525	–	–	–	–	–	–	–	–	12,495
Rimouski	Lib	UN	7,437	51.73%	1,417	9.86%	79.93%	7,437	6,020	920	–	–	–	–	–	–	–	–	14,377
Rivière-du-Loup	New	Lib	7,061	50.37%	901	6.43%	84.20%	6,160	7,061	797	–	–	–	–	–	–	–	–	14,018
Roberval	Lib	UN	6,071	42.86%	708	5.00%	85.57%	6,071	5,363	1,509	–	1,222	–	–	–	–	–	–	14,165
Rouville	Lib	UN	3,529	45.46%	17	0.22%	84.13%	3,529	3,512	722	–	–	–	–	–	–	–	–	7,763
Rouyn-Noranda	New	CCF	2,100	21.03%	250	2.50%	75.46%	1,643	1,753	1,850	2,100	1,411	–	14	1,215	–	–	–	9,986
Saint-Hyacinthe	Lib	UN	5,962	44.97%	995	7.50%	70.64%	5,962	4,967	1,716	–	–	–	614	–	–	–	–	13,259
Saint-Jean	New	UN	5,525	55.33%	1,804	18.07%	79.91%	5,525	3,721	739	–	–	–	–	–	–	–	–	9,985
Saint-Maurice	Lib	UN	9,933	51.86%	5,219	27.25%	82.65%	9,933	4,317	4,714	189	–	–	–	–	–	–	–	19,153
Saint-Sauveur	Lib	Lib	8,796	45.88%	1,590	8.29%	79.02%	7,206	8,796	1,189	172	–	–	–	–	–	–	1,810	19,173
Shefford	Lib	UN	6,473	42.85%	1,297	8.59%	80.97%	6,473	5,176	2,916	–	541	–	–	–	–	–	–	15,106
Sherbrooke	UN	UN	10,559	52.03%	3,649	17.98%	74.64%	10,559	6,910	2,825	–	–	–	–	–	–	–	–	20,294
Stanstead	Lib	BP	3,522	29.16%	404	3.34%	75.40%	3,118	2,785	3,522	–	553	–	2,100	–	–	–	–	12,078
Témiscamingue	Lib	UN	2,225	34.50%	335	5.19%	80.35%	2,225	1,890	1,486	848	–	–	–	–	–	–	–	6,449
Témiscouata	Lib	UN	4,326	48.88%	734	8.29%	83.40%	4,326	3,592	933	–	–	–	–	–	–	–	–	8,851
Terrebonne	Lib	UN	11,471	49.16%	1,040	4.46%	82.65%	11,471	10,431	1,432	–	–	–	–	–	–	–	–	23,334
Trois-Rivières	UN	UN	12,576	66.74%	7,258	38.52%	80.41%	12,576	5,318	950	–	–	–	–	–	–	–	–	18,844
Vaudreuil-Soulanges	Lib	Lib	4,714	46.00%	351	3.43%	79.46%	4,363	4,714	1,170	–	–	–	–	–	–	–	–	10,247
Verchères	New	Lib	4,036	62.78%	2,203	34.27%	76.97%	1,833	4,036	560	–	–	–	–	–	–	–	–	6,429
Westmount–Saint-Georges	Lib	Lib	14,271	75.74%	12,340	65.49%	45.27%	1,296	14,271	–	1,931	–	–	1,344	–	–	–	–	18,842
Wolfe	Lib	UN	3,478	46.74%	61	0.82%	88.07%	3,478	3,417	546	–	–	–	–	–	–	–	–	7,441
Yamaska	UN	UN	4,166	62.93%	2,201	33.25%	77.43%	4,166	1,965	489	–	–	–	–	–	–	–	–	6,620

= open seat
= turnout is above provincial average
= winning candidate was in previous Legislature
= incumbent had switched allegiance
= not incumbent; was previously elected to the Legislature
= incumbency arose from byelection gain
= previously incumbent in another riding
= other incumbents renominated
= previously an MP in the House of Commons of Canada
= multiple candidates

=== Effect of redistribution ===
The reorganized ridings returned the following MLAs:

1939		1944	
Riding	Party	Riding	Party
Témiscamingue	█ Liberal	Témiscamingue	█ Union Nationale
Témiscamingue	█ Liberal	Rouyn-Noranda	█ Co-operative Commonwealth
Châteauguay-Laprairie █ Liberal Saint-Jean–Napierville █ Liberal		Châteauguay	█ Liberal
Châteauguay-Laprairie █ Liberal Saint-Jean–Napierville █ Liberal		Napierville-Laprairie	█ Union Nationale
Châteauguay-Laprairie █ Liberal Saint-Jean–Napierville █ Liberal		Saint-Jean	█ Union Nationale
Abitibi	█ Liberal	Abitibi-Est	█ Liberal
Abitibi	█ Liberal	Abitibi-Ouest	█ Union Nationale
Kamouraska–Rivière-du-Loup	█ Liberal	Kamouraska	█ Liberal
Kamouraska–Rivière-du-Loup	█ Liberal	Rivière-du-Loup	█ Liberal
Richelieu-Verchères	█ Liberal	Richelieu	█ Liberal
Richelieu-Verchères	█ Liberal	Verchères	█ Liberal

=== Analysis ===
Party candidates in 2nd place
Party in 1st place	Party in 2nd place								Total
Party in 1st place	UN	Lib	BP	CCF	Ind	I-Lib	Lab	LP	Total
Union Nationale		44	2		1	1			48
Liberal	28		4	3			1	1	37
Bloc populaire	3	1							4
Co-operative Commonwealth			1						1
Nationalist		1							1
Total	31	46	7	3	1	1	1	1	91

Candidates ranked 1st to 5th place, by party
Parties	1st	2nd	3rd	4th	5th	Total
█ Union Nationale	48	31	8	2	2	91
█ Liberal	37	46	7			90
█ Bloc populaire	4	7	60	9		80
█ Co-operative Commonwealth	1	3	2	13	4	23
█ Nationalist	1		1			2
█ Independent		1	3	5	4	13
█ Independent Liberal		1	1	2		4
█ Labour		1		1		2
█ Labor–Progressive		1			1	2
█ Union des électeurs			2	7	3	12
█ Independent Unionist			1	1	1	3
█ Candidat du peuple			1			1
█ Independent-CCF				1		1
█ Independent Bloc					1	1

Resulting composition of the 22nd Quebec Legislative Assembly
Source		Party					
Source		UN	Lib	BP	CCF	Nat	Total
Seats retained	Incumbents returned	13	24				37
Seats retained	Open seats held	1	6				7
Seats changing hands	Incumbents defeated - by previous incumbent	10					10
Seats changing hands	Incumbents defeated - by new MLAs	6		4			10
Seats changing hands	Open seats gained - previous incumbents returned	7					7
Seats changing hands	Open seats gained - new MLAs	7	1				8
Seats changing hands	Byelection gains held	1					1
Seats changing hands	Incumbent switched riding					1	1
New ridings	Incumbent returned in new seat	1	2				3
New ridings	Previous member of Legislature reelected	1					1
New ridings	MP migrated from Parliament of Canada		1				1
New ridings	New MLA elected	1	3		1		5
Total		48	37	4	1	1	91

== See also ==
- List of Quebec premiers
- Politics of Quebec
- Timeline of Quebec history
- List of Quebec political parties
- 22nd Legislative Assembly of Quebec
