= George O'Reilly =

Canadian politician

Member of the Legislative Assembly of Quebec for Montréal-Verdun
- In office 1960–1964
- Preceded by: Lionel-Alfred Ross
- Succeeded by: Claude Wagner

Member of the Legislative Council of Quebec for De la Durantaye
- In office 1964–1968
- Preceded by: Joseph Boulanger
- Succeeded by: Institution abolished

Personal details
- Born: 27 February 1911 Pointe-Saint-Charles, Montreal, Quebec
- Died: 17 June 1992 (aged 81) Montreal, Quebec
- Party: Liberal

George O'Reilly (27 February 1911 – 17 June 1992) was a Canadian politician.

Born in Pointe-Saint-Charles, Montreal, Quebec, O'Reilly was a Verdun city councillor from 1951 to 1960 and mayor from 1960 to 1966. He was elected to the Legislative Assembly of Quebec for Montréal-Verdun in 1960. A Liberal, he was re-elected in 1962. He was appointed to the Legislative Council of Quebec for De la Durantaye in 1964 and served until the Council's abolition in 1968.
