= Roger Paquin =

Canadian politician

Member of the National Assembly of Quebec for Saint-Jean
- In office September 12, 1994 – April 14, 2003
- Preceded by: Michel Charbonneau
- Succeeded by: Jean-Pierre Paquin

Personal details
- Born: July 24, 1947 (age 78) Montreal, Quebec
- Party: Parti Québécois
- Profession: Biologist, educator

Roger Paquin (born July 24, 1947) is a Quebec politician. He served as the member for Saint-Jean in the Quebec National Assembly as a member of the Parti Québécois from 1994 until 2003.

== Biography ==
Paquin was born in Montreal, He earned a Bachelor of Arts degree, a Bachelor of Science degree in Biology, and a master's degree in science didactics from the Université de Montréal. He obtained a certificate in cognitive style mapping from Oakland Community College and a certificate in project management from the Université du Québec à Trois-Rivières.

Paquin was a Professor of Biology at the Cégep de Saint-Jean-sur-Richelieu and served as a professional in the General Directorate of Collegial Education at the Quebec Ministry of Education.

== Political career ==
Paquin served as secretary and later the president of his local PQ riding executive. He later became Chairman of the National Council of the provincial party. He ran in Saint-Jean in 1994; the election ended in a tie between him and Liberal incumbent Michel Charbonneau with 16,536 votes each. A by-election was called and a month later Paquin won by 532 votes. He was re-elected without any difficulty in 1998.

He was Parliamentary Secretary to the Minister responsible for the Montérégie Region in the Bouchard government. He then became Parliamentary Secretary to the Minister of the Environment, and then the Parliamentary Secretary to the Minister of the Environment and Water in both the Bouchard and the Landry governments.

Paquin sought re-election in 2003, and lost to Liberal Jean-Pierre Paquin (no relation).

== Electoral record ==
=== Provincial ===
Quebec provincial by-election, October 24, 1994: Saint-Jean
Party	Candidate	Votes	%	±%
Parti Québécois	Roger Paquin	15,680	43.80	+1.30
Liberal	Michel Charbonneau	15,148	42.30	-0.20
Action démocratique	Daniel Lefebvre	4,693	11.96	+1.14
New Democratic	Julien Patenaude	204	0.60	-1.00
Sovereignty	Réal Brunette	232	0.20	-0.40
Total valid votes		35,807	98.66	
Total rejected ballots		487	1.34	-1.61
Turnout		36,294	76.53	-5.48
Electors on the lists		47,426		
Parti Québécois gain from Liberal		Swing		+0.75

1994 Quebec general election: Saint-Jean
Party	Candidate	Votes	%	±%
Liberal	Michel Charbonneau	16,536	42.50	-11.10
Parti Québécois	Roger Paquin	16,536	42.50	+3.20
Action démocratique	Daniel Lefebvre	4,494	11.96	–
New Democratic	Julien Patenaude	638	1.60	-3.40
Natural Law	Anne Bélanger	313	0.80	–
Sovereignty	Réal Brunette	232	0.60	–
Equality	Richard Beaucage	145	0.40	–
Total valid votes		38,894	–	
Turnout		38,894	82.01	+3.85
Electors on the lists		47,426		
The result was declared void as a result of the tie and a subsequent by-election was held on October 24, 1994
