= John Richard Hyde =

Canadian politician

Member of the Legislative Assembly of Quebec for Westmount–Saint-Georges
- In office 1954–1966
- Preceded by: George Carlyle Marler
- Succeeded by: None, district abolished

Member of the National Assembly of Quebec for Westmount
- In office 1966–1970
- Preceded by: None, district re-created
- Succeeded by: Thomas Kevin Drummond

Personal details
- Born: 15 November 1912 Montreal, Quebec
- Died: 15 July 2003 (aged 90) Kanata, Ontario

Military service
- Allegiance: Canada
- Branch/service: Royal Canadian Artillery
- Rank: Brigadier-General

John Richard Hyde (15 November 1912 – 15 July 2003) was a Canadian soldier, provincial politician and judge.

== Education ==
Born in Montreal, Quebec, the son of George Gordon Hyde, a Quebec MNA and member of the Legislative Council of Quebec, and Lilian Boronow, he studied at the Royal Military College of Canada from 1930 to 1934. He studied law at Cambridge University from 1934 to 1935 and the Université de Montréal from 1935 to 1938. He was called to the Quebec Bar in 1938.

== Career ==
He practiced law with his father at law firm of Hyde and Ahern (now called Ahern, Lalonde, Nuss & Drymer). During World War II, he served with the Royal Canadian Artillery in France and Belgium. After the war, he resumed his law practice and remained in the reserves eventually reaching the rank of Brigadier-General.

He was elected to the Legislative Assembly of Quebec representing the riding of Westmount–Saint-Georges in a 1955 by-election. A Liberal, he was re-elected in 1956, 1960, 1962, and 1966. He was Speaker of the Legislative Assembly from January 9, 1962 to October 14, 1965. From 1965 to 1966, he was the Minister of Revenue in the cabinet of Jean Lesage. In 1971 he was made a judge of the Provincial Court. He retired in 1982.

He died in Kanata, Ontario in 2003.

== Bibliography ==
- H16511 Dr. Richard Arthur Preston "Canada's RMC - A History of Royal Military College" Second Edition 1982
- H16511 Dr. Richard Preston "RMC and Kingston: The effect of imperial and military influences on a Canadian community" 1968
- H1877 R. Guy C. Smith (editor) "As You Were! Ex-Cadets Remember". In 2 Volumes. Volume I: 1876-1918. Volume II: 1919-1984. Royal Military College of Canada [Kingston, Ontario]. The R.M.C. Club of Canada. 1984
