= Wilfrid-Eldège Lauriault =

Canadian politician

Wilfrid-Eldège Lauriault was a politician Quebec, Canada and a Member of the Legislative Assembly of Quebec (MLA).

== Early life ==
He was born on November 24, 1899, in Montreal and became an engineer.

== Member of the legislature ==
He ran as an Action libérale nationale candidate in the district of Montréal–Saint-Henri in the 1935 provincial election and won. Lauriault refused to join Maurice Duplessis's Union Nationale. Instead, he ran as an Independent Liberal in the 1936 election and lost against René Labelle.

== Federal politics ==
Lauriault ran as an Independent Liberal in the federal district of Saint-Henri in 1940 and finished second.

== City Councillor ==
Lauriault won a seat to the City Council of Montreal in 1944. He was re-elected in 1947, 1950, 1954 and 1957. He was defeated in 1960.

== Death ==
He died on November 13, 1976, in Montreal.

== Footnotes ==
National Assembly of Quebec
| Preceded by Joseph-Maurice Gabias (Liberal) | MLA, District of Montréal–Saint-Henri; 1935–1936 | Succeeded by René Labelle (Union Nationale) |
