= Lucille Méthé =

Canadian politician

Lucille Methe

Member of Parliament for Saint-Jean (2007-2008)
- Incumbent
- Assumed office 25 April 2007
- Preceded by: Jean-Pierre Paquin
- Succeeded by: Dave Turcotte

Personal details
- Born: 15 December 1957 (age 68) Henryville, Quebec
- Party: Action democratique du Quebec
- Cabinet: Assistant Whip of the Opposition
- Portfolio: Government services

Lucille Méthé (born 15 December 1957, in Henryville, Quebec) was the Action démocratique du Québec Member of the National Assembly of Quebec, Canada, for the electoral district of Saint-Jean.

== Background ==
Methe has a Bachelor's Degree in Business Administration from the Université du Québec à Montréal and also studied at the Séminaire de Sherbrooke in International Commerce in 2001. She also worked as an advertisement publisher and originator, a promotion agent and a cooperative and export adviser.

== Prior attempts ==
She was the ADQ candidate for Iberville in the 2003, but lost to Liberal candidate Jean Rioux. She also was the Action civique candidate for Mayor of Saint-Jean-sur-Richelieu in the 2005, but was defeated by Gilles Dolbec.

Méthé was first elected in 2007 with 42% of the vote. Liberal incumbent Jean-Pierre Paquin, finished third with 25% of the vote. On 29 March 2007, Méthé was appointed Deputy Official Opposition House Whip and the critic for government services.

== Footnotes ==
Political offices
| Preceded by Jacques Côté (PQ) | Deputy Official Opposition House Whip; 2007–Current | Succeeded by Incumbent |
