= Michel Charbonneau =

Canadian politician

Member of the National Assembly of Quebec for Saint-Jean
- In office 1989–1994
- Preceded by: Pierre Lorrain
- Succeeded by: Roger Paquin

Personal details
- Born: September 23, 1948 (age 77) Napierville, Quebec, Canada
- Party: Quebec Liberal Party

Michel Charbonneau (born September 23, 1948) is a Canadian politician, who represented the electoral district of Saint-Jean in the National Assembly of Quebec from 1989 to 1994.

Born and raised in Napierville, Quebec, Charbonneau served as a municipal councillor and mayor of Napierville before being elected to the legislature in the 1989 election. In the legislature, he served as chair of a task force on reform of trucking regulations in the province.

In the 1994 election, he was initially declared to have been narrowly defeated by Roger Paquin of the Parti Québécois. After a judicial recount, however, the two were found to have finished in an exact tie, necessitating a new by-election to determine the winner. Paquin won the by-election.

== Electoral record ==
1994 Quebec general election: Saint-Jean
Party	Candidate	Votes	%	±%
Liberal	Michel Charbonneau	16,536	42.50	-11.10
Parti Québécois	Roger Paquin	16,536	42.50	+3.20
Action démocratique	Daniel Lefebvre	4,494	11.96	–
New Democratic	Julien Patenaude	638	1.60	-3.40
Natural Law	Anne Bélanger	313	0.80	–
Sovereignty	Réal Brunette	232	0.60	–
Equality	Richard Beaucage	145	0.40	–
Total valid votes		38,894	–	
Turnout		38,894	82.01	+3.85
Electors on the lists		47,426		
The result was declared void as a result of the tie and a subsequent by-election was held on October 24, 1994

Quebec provincial by-election, October 24, 1994: Saint-Jean
Party	Candidate	Votes	%	±%
Parti Québécois	Roger Paquin	15,680	43.80	+1.30
Liberal	Michel Charbonneau	15,148	42.30	-0.20
Action démocratique	Daniel Lefebvre	4,693	11.96	+1.14
New Democratic	Julien Patenaude	204	0.60	-1.00
Sovereignty	Réal Brunette	232	0.20	-0.40
Total valid votes		35,807	98.66	
Total rejected ballots		487	1.34	-1.61
Turnout		36,294	76.53	-5.48
Electors on the lists		47,426		
Parti Québécois gain from Liberal		Swing		+0.75
