= George Gordon Hyde =

Canadian politician (1883–1946)

George Gordon Hyde KC
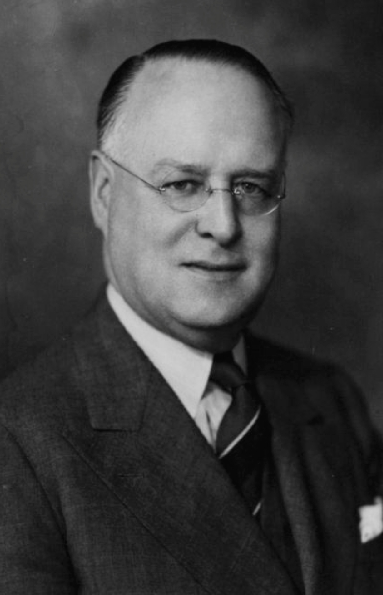

Member of the Legislative Assembly of Quebec for Westmount–Saint-Georges
- In office 1939–1942
- Preceded by: Riding merged
- Succeeded by: George Carlyle Marler

Member of the Legislative Council of Quebec for Victoria
- In office 1942–1946
- Preceded by: Gordon Wallace Scott
- Succeeded by: George Buchanan Foster

Personal details
- Born: January 24, 1883 Montreal, Quebec, Canada
- Died: July 20, 1946 (aged 63) Montreal, Quebec
- Party: Liberal

George Gordon Hyde KC (January 24, 1883 – July 20, 1946) was a Canadian politician and lawyer.

Born in Montreal, Quebec, on January 24, 1883, Hyde was educated at the High School of Montreal and McGill University, where he obtained a law degree, and was called to the Quebec Bar on August 21, 1908. He became well known in the fields of company and commercial law, first with the law firm of R.C. Smith, KC, and later as senior partner of his own firm, Hyde & Ahern. He was made King's Counsel December 27, 1918, and elected president of the Junior Bar Association of Montreal 1919. In 1935, he was elected president of the Reform Club of Montreal. He was later elected as Quebec Vice-president of the Canadian Bar Association in 1944.

In 1939, Hyde ran as Liberal candidate in the provincial riding of Westmount–Saint-Georges and was elected as member of Quebec's Legislative Assembly. In 1942, he was appointed as a Member of the Legislative Council of Quebec.

Hyde was married to Lilian Boronow, and was the father of John Richard Hyde, also a Montreal lawyer (with the firm of Hyde & Ahern), who represented the provincial riding of Westmount–Saint-Georges from 1954 through 1970. Another son, Flight Lieutenant George G. (Kewp) Hyde, RCAF, was killed on active service in England during the Second World War. He also had a daughter, Shirley Anne.

Hyde died in Montreal on July 20, 1946, at the age of 62.
