= Pierre Lorrain =

Canadian politician

Pierre Lorain

Member of the National Assembly of Quebec for Saint-Jean
- In office 1985–1989
- Preceded by: Jérôme Proulx
- Succeeded by: Michel Charbonneau

Personal details
- Born: April 21, 1942 Farnham, Quebec
- Died: December 24, 2004 (aged 62)
- Party: Quebec Liberal Party

Pierre Lorrain (French pronunciation: [pjɛʁ lɔʁɛ̃]; April 21, 1942 – December 24, 2004) was a lawyer and political figure in Quebec. He represented Saint-Jean in the Quebec National Assembly from 1985 to 1989 as a Liberal.

== Early life and education ==
He was born in Farnham, Quebec, the son of Roch Lorrain and Jeanne Marcil, and was educated at the Collège Roussin and the Université de Sherbrooke. Lorrain was admitted to the Quebec bar in 1973 and practised law in Saint-Jean-sur-Richelieu.

== Career ==
He was president and founder of the Haut-Richelieu Tourism bureau. Lorrain served as President of the National Assembly from 1985 to 1989. He did not run for reelection in 1989. In that year, he was named Quebec delegate-general to Brussels. Lorrain served as president of the Quebec Legal Services commission from 1994 to 1999 and for the Municipal commission from 1999 to 2004.

== Personal life ==
Lorrain died in Saint-Jean-sur-Richelieu at the age of 62. He was survived by his wife, Johanne Desrochers.
