= Jérôme Proulx =

Canadian politician (1930–2021)

Member of the National Assembly of Quebec for Saint-Jean
- In office 1966–1970
- Preceded by: Philodor Ouimet
- Succeeded by: Jacques Veilleux
- In office 1976–1985
- Preceded by: Jacques Veilleux
- Succeeded by: Pierre Lorrain

Personal details
- Born: April 28, 1930 Saint-Jérôme, Quebec
- Died: August 26, 2021 (aged 91)
- Party: Union Nationale (1966–1969); Parti Québécois (1969–2021)

Jérôme Proulx (April 28, 1930 – August 26, 2021) was a nationalist politician in Quebec, Canada and a member of the National Assembly of Quebec from 1966 to 1970 and from 1976 to 1985.

== Early life and education ==
He was born on April 28, 1930, in Saint-Jérôme, Quebec, and made a career in education.

== Career ==
=== Politics ===
Proulx won a seat in the 1966 Quebec election in the district of Saint-Jean as a member of the Union Nationale. In November 1969 he left his party to protest the passage of Bill 63, a controversial language law, sitting first as an independent, and then fifteen days later joining the Parti Québécois (PQ). He ran as a PQ candidate in 1970 and 1973, but lost both times.

He was returned to the legislature in 1976 and won re-election in 1981. During the Parti Québécois Crisis of 1984, Proulx temporarily sat as an Independent to promote a more proactive approach concerning the promotion of sovereignty. Proulx lost re-election in 1985.

=== Writing ===
He authored Un panier de crabes in 1971.
