= Dave Turcotte =

Canadian politician

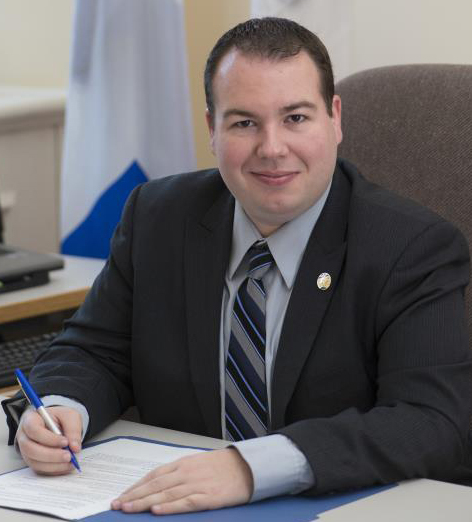
- Dave Turcotte 2013

Member of the National Assembly of Quebec for Saint-Jean
- In office December 8, 2008 – August 29, 2018
- Preceded by: Lucille Méthé
- Succeeded by: Louis Lemieux

Personal details
- Born: May 21, 1983 (age 43) Longueuil, Quebec, Canada
- Party: Parti Québécois
- Education: Université de Montréal

Dave Turcotte (born May 21, 1983) is a Canadian politician in the province of Quebec. Turcotte was elected to represent the riding of Saint-Jean in the National Assembly of Quebec in the 2008 provincial election. He is a member of the Parti Québécois.

Born in Longueuil, Quebec, Turcotte graduated from the Université de Montréal with a bachelor's degree in communications and politics and is owner of a communications agency. He was also an assistant to Saint-Jean MP Claude Bachand of the Bloc Québécois.

Turcotte defeated Lucille Méthé of the ADQ in the 2008 elections.
