= Jean-Pierre Paquin =

Canadian importer and politician

Member of the National Assembly of Quebec for Saint-Jean
- In office 2003–2007

Personal details
- Born: August 23, 1948 (age 78) Montreal, Quebec, Canada
- Party: Liberal Party
- Education: Cégep de Saint-Hyacinthe
- Occupation: Importer, Politician

Jean-Pierre Paquin (born August 23, 1948) is a Canadian importer and politician from Quebec. He served as a Member of Parliament, representing Saint-Jean in the National Assembly of Quebec as a member of the Quebec Liberal Party from 2003 to 2007.

== Life and career ==
Paquin was born in Montreal, Quebec. He earned a business degree from Cégep de Saint-Hyacinthe in 1965. He founded Propriétaire des Importations J. P. P. in 1972.

Paquin later trained in professional marketing and management at Collège Jean-Guy Leboeuf of the Collège de l'immobilier du Québec in Verdun, Quebec in 1976. He served in several other leadership positions in Saint-Jean-sur-Richelieu: as a hospital trustee from 1999 to 2000, on the Chamber of Commerce from 2000 to 2003, and on the Board of Directors of the city's Canada Day celebration in 2001 and 2002.

As a candidate for Union Nationale, he was defeated in the 1976 Quebec general election. In the 2003 Quebec general election Paquin changed party affiliations to the Quebec Liberal Party and won the seat previously held since the 1994 Quebec general election by Roger Paquin (no relation) of Parti Québécois.

Paquin was defeated in the 2007 Quebec general election by Lucille Méthé, who won 42% of the vote. Paquin finished third with 25% of the vote.
