= George Carlyle Marler =

Canadian politician (1901-1981)

The Honourable George Carlyle Marler PC
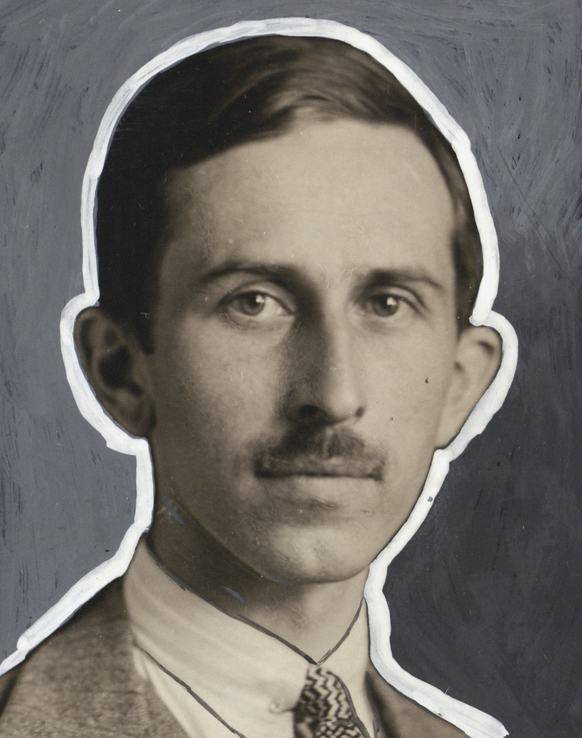

Member of the Legislative Assembly of Quebec
- In office March 23, 1942 – June 30, 1954
- Preceded by: George Gordon Hyde
- Succeeded by: John Richard Hyde
- Constituency: Westmount–Saint-Georges

Member of the Canadian House of Commons
- In office November 8, 1954 – February 1, 1958
- Preceded by: Douglas Charles Abbott
- Succeeded by: Ross Webster
- Constituency: Saint-Antoine—Westmount

Member of the Legislative Council of Quebec for Inkerman
- In office 1960–1968
- Preceded by: Robert R. Ness
- Succeeded by: Institution abolished

Personal details
- Born: September 14, 1901 Montreal, Quebec, Canada
- Died: April 10, 1981 (aged 79) Montreal, Quebec, Canada
- Party: Liberal Party of Quebec; Liberal Party of Canada
- Spouse(s): Phyllis Constance Walker, daughter of Herbert Barber Walker, banker, and Annabella Fraser.
- Occupation: notary

George Carlyle Marler, PC (September 14, 1901 – April 10, 1981 ) was a politician, notary and philatelist in Quebec, Canada.

== Education ==
Born in Montreal, Quebec, Marler studied at Selwyn House School, Bishop's College School, Royal Naval College of Canada and McGill University, where he earned a bachelor of civil law degree.

== City Councillor ==
Marler served as city councillor from 1940 to 1947 and as Deputy Chairman of Montreal Executive Committee in Montreal.

== Member of the legislature ==
Marler successfully ran as a Liberal candidate in the provincial district of Westmount–Saint-Georges in a by-election held on March 23, 1942. He was re-elected in the 1944, 1948 and 1952 elections.

== Leader of the Opposition ==
In the 1948 election, Liberal Leader Adélard Godbout lost re-election in the district of L'Islet. Marler took over as Leader of the Official Opposition. Godbout resigned as Liberal Leader on July 22, 1949. At the 1950 Quebec Liberal Party leadership convention, Marler declined nomination, and Georges-Émile Lapalme became the new party leader on May 20, 1950. However, Lapalme failed to win a seat in the legislature in the 1952 election, so Marler continued as Leader of the Opposition until Lapalme won a by-election in 1953.

== Member of the Federal Cabinet ==
Marler resigned from the legislature on June 30, 1954, and was appointed to the federal cabinet of Louis Saint-Laurent as minister of transport. Later that year he won a by-election and became the Member of Pariliament for the federal district of Saint-Antoine—Westmount. He was re-elected in the 1957, but was defeated in 1958.

== Legislative Councillor ==
Marler was appointed Minister without Portfolio in the Cabinet of Jean Lesage in October 1960. A month later, he was appointed to the Legislative Council of Quebec.

== Death ==
Marler died on April 10, 1981, in Montreal.

== Books ==
- The Edward VII issue of Canada : a detailed study / by George C. Marler. -- [Ottawa] : National Postal Museum, c1975.
- The law of real property : Quebec / by William de Montmollin Marler; completed and arranged by George C. Marler; with a foreword by P.B. Mignault. -- Toronto : Burroughs, 1932.
- Canada, the admiral issue, 1911-1925 / by George C. Marler. -- Toronto : Unitrade Press, 1980.
- Canada : notes on the 1911-1925 issue. -- State College, Pa : American Philatelic Society, 1949.
- Booklets of the admiral stamps of 1911 to 1925 / by George C. Marler; editor R.J. Woolley. -- [Canada? : s.n., 1970?] ([Thornhill [Ont.] : J.F. Webb]).

== Archives ==
There is a George Carlyle Marler fonds at Library and Archives Canada.

== See also ==
- Politics of Quebec
- Quebec general elections
- List of Quebec leaders of the Opposition
- Timeline of Quebec history
- List of Bishop's College School alumni
