= Richelieu-Verchères =

Richelieu-Verchères may refer to:

- Richelieu—Verchères (federal electoral district)
- Richelieu-Verchères (provincial electoral district)
