= Gaétan Bédard =

Canadian Army officer

Gaétan Bédard CD MNA

Member of the National Assembly for Saint-Jean
- Incumbent
- Assumed office October 5, 2026

Personal details
- Born: Sherbrooke, Quebec, Canada
- Party: Parti Québécois
- Awards: Canadian Forces' Decoration; Chief of the Defence Staff (CDS) Commendation; US Army Commendation Medal

Military service
- Allegiance: Canada
- Branch/service: Canadian Army
- Years of service: 1994–2023
- Rank: Colonel
- Commands: RMC Saint-Jean; Canadian Forces Leadership and Recruit School
- Battles/wars: Yugoslav Wars: NATO intervention in Bosnia and Herzegovina; War in Afghanistan

Colonel Gaétan Bédard, CD, MNA is a retired Canadian Army colonel who served as the Commandant of RMC Saint-Jean. Previously, Bédard served as commandant of the Canadian Forces Leadership and Recruit School and was an Executive Assistant to the Vice Chief of the Defence Staff at National Defence Headquarters.

== Education ==
Gaétan Bédard enrolled into the Canadian Armed Forces in 1994 and attended the Royal Military College Saint-Jean and the Royal Military College of Canada where he would graduate with a bachelor's degree in military studies. In addition he holds a Masters of Defence Studies from the Canadian Forces College, and a Master of Arts in Strategic Studies from the US Army Command and General Staff College.

== Military career ==
After Graduating from the Royal Military College Bédard commissioned into the 2nd Battalion, Royal 22e Régiment as a Infantry Platoon commander. In 2002 he would deploy to Bosnia and Herzegovina for Operation Palladium part of the NATO intervention in Bosnia and Herzegovina. He would later be a Company commander in Operation Hestia in Haiti with the 3rd Battalion. He would later deploy to Afghanistan as a mentor to Afghan army and police elements, for which he would be awarded with the Chief of the Defence Staff Commendation.

In 2016, Bédard took command of the Canadian Forces Leadership and Recruit School a position he held until 2018. In 2026, Gaétan Bédard took command of the Canadian Forces Leadership and Recruit School, a position he held until 2018. In June 2021, he took over command of RMC Saint-Jean until his retirement from the Canadian Armed Forces in July 2023.

== Political career ==
Bédard was selected by the Parti Québécois to be their candidate for the National Assembly of Quebec in Saint-Jean in the 2026 Quebec general election.

== Electoral record ==
2026 Quebec general election: Saint-Jean
** Preliminary results — Not yet official **
Party	Candidate	Votes	%	±%
Parti Québécois	Gaétan Bédard	15,061	35.62	
Liberal	Patrice Léger-Bourgoin	7,906	18.70	
Coalition Avenir Québec	Yves Bisson	7,146	16.90	
Conservative	Luc Sanfaçon	6,950	16.44	
Québec solidaire	Pierre-Luc Lavertu	4,409	10.43	
Parti nul	Martin Boudreau	283	0.67	
Climat Québec	Denis Thériault	223	0.53	
Présence	Julie Larouche	191	0.45	
Démocratie directe	Jean-Charles Cléroux	109	0.26	
Total valid votes				
Total rejected ballots				
Turnout			69.81	
Electors on the lists			–	–
Parti Québécois gain from Coalition Avenir Québec		Swing		+
Source: Élections Québec
