= Saint-Jean–Napierville =

Coordinates: 45.19°N 73.39°W

Quebec electoral district

Defunct provincial electoral district
- Legislature: National Assembly of Quebec
- District created: 1939
- District abolished: 1944
- First contested: 1939
- Last contested: 1941 (by-election)

Saint-Jean–Napierville was a former provincial electoral district in the province of Quebec, Canada.

It was created for the 1939 election from all of Saint-Jean and part of Napierville-Laprairie electoral districts. It existed for only that one general election and a 1941 by-election. It disappeared in the 1944 election and its successor electoral district was the recreated Saint-Jean.

== Members of the Legislative Assembly ==
- Alexis Bouthillier, Liberal (1939–1940)
- Jean-Paul Beaulieu, Union Nationale (1941–1944)
