= Châteauguay-Laprairie =

Coordinates: 45°20′N 73°39′W

Quebec electoral district

Defunct provincial electoral district
- Legislature: National Assembly of Quebec
- District created: 1939
- District abolished: 1944
- First contested: 1939
- Last contested: 1939

Châteauguay-Laprairie was a former provincial electoral district in the province of Quebec, Canada.

Many sources (including the National Assembly website) write it as Châteauguay-La Prairie, but contemporary sources show the "Laprairie" part of the name written as one word. This alternate way of spelling it is probably by analogy with the modern-day La Prairie electoral district, which was spelled "Laprairie" before 1988.

It was created for the 1939 election, from parts of the Châteauguay and Napierville-Laprairie electoral districts. It existed for only that one election. It disappeared in the 1944 election and its successor electoral district was the recreated Châteauguay.

== Members of the Legislative Assembly ==
- Roméo Fortin, Liberal (1939–1944)
