= Westmount–Saint-Georges =

Coordinates: 45°29′N 73°36′W

Quebec electoral district

Defunct provincial electoral district
- Legislature: National Assembly of Quebec
- District created: 1939
- District abolished: 1965
- First contested: 1939
- Last contested: 1962

Westmount–Saint-Georges was a former provincial electoral district in the Montreal region of Quebec, Canada. It elected members to the Legislative Assembly of Quebec.

It was created for the 1939 election from Westmount electoral district. Its final election was in 1962. It disappeared in the 1966 election and its successor electoral district was the re-created Westmount.

== Members of the Legislative Assembly ==
Legislature	Years	Member	Party
Riding created from Westmount
21st	1939–1942	George Gordon Hyde	Liberal
21st	1942–1944	George Carlyle Marler	Liberal
22nd	1944–1948	George Carlyle Marler	Liberal
23rd	1948–1952	George Carlyle Marler	Liberal
24th	1952–1955	George Carlyle Marler	Liberal
24th	1955–1956	John Richard Hyde	Liberal
25th	1956–1960	John Richard Hyde	Liberal
26th	1960–1962	John Richard Hyde	Liberal
27th	1962–1966	John Richard Hyde	Liberal
Dissolved into Westmount
