= Lionel-Alfred Ross =

Lionel-Alfred Ross (May 5, 1914 in Station-du-Coteau — September 19, 1973 in Dorval) was a Canadian politician who represented the riding of Montréal-Verdun in the Legislative Assembly of Quebec, from 1944 until 1960. He was first elected as a Liberal, but sat as an independent beginning in 1957.

After leaving the legislature, Ross served as a judge in the Provincial Court, and as president of the Commission des loyers (a precursor agency to the Tribunal administratif du logement).
