= Jean-Paul Beaulieu =

Canadian politician (1902–1976)

Jean-Paul Beaulieu C.A.
- Official 1966 portrait

Member of the Canadian Parliament for Saint-Jean—Iberville—Napierville
- In office 1965–1968
- Preceded by: Yvon Dupuis
- Succeeded by: Riding redistributed into Missisquoi and Saint-Jean

Member of the Legislative Assembly of Quebec for Saint-Jean–Napierville
- In office 1941–1944
- Preceded by: Alexis Bouthillier
- Succeeded by: District abolished

Member of the Legislative Assembly of Quebec for Saint-Jean
- In office 1944–1960
- Preceded by: District created
- Succeeded by: Philodor Ouimet

Personal details
- Born: January 22, 1902 Saint-Paul-de-l'Île-aux-Noix, Quebec, Canada
- Died: November 14, 1976 (aged 74) Montreal, Quebec, Canada
- Party: Progressive Conservative

Jean-Paul Beaulieu (January 22, 1902 – November 14, 1976) was a Canadian and Québécois politician and chartered accountant.

== Background ==
He was born on January 22, 1902, in Saint-Paul-de-l'Île-aux-Noix, Montérégie. He studied at the Université de Montréal and McGill University. He obtained a license degree in commercial sciences from McGill. He has received honorary doctorates from Université Laval and Université de Montréal

== Member of the legislature ==
Beaulieu won a by-election in 1941 and became the Union Nationale Member of the Legislative Assembly of Quebec for the provincial electoral district of Saint-Jean–Napierville. He was re-elected in the district of Saint-Jean in the 1944, 1948, 1952 and 1956 elections.

He was appointed to the Cabinet in 1944 and served as Minister of Trade and Commerce, until his defeated in the 1960 election. He was defeated again in the 1962 election.

== Federal politics ==
He was elected to the House of Commons of Canada as a Member of the Progressive Conservative Party to represent the riding of Saint-Jean—Iberville—Napierville in the 1965 federal election. He lost in the 1968 election.

== Death ==
Beaulieu died on November 14, 1976.
