= Montréal-Verdun =

Quebec electoral district

Defunct provincial electoral district
- Legislature: National Assembly of Quebec
- District created: 1922
- District abolished: 1965
- First contested: 1923
- Last contested: 1964

Montréal-Verdun (French pronunciation: [mɔ̃ʁeal vɛʁdœ̃]) was a provincial electoral district in the Montreal region of Quebec, Canada, that elected members to the Legislative Assembly of Quebec.

It was created for the 1923 election from part of Jacques-Cartier electoral district. Its final election was in 1962. It was abolished prior to the 1966 election and its successor electoral district was Verdun.

== Members of the Legislative Assembly ==
- Pierre-Auguste Lafleur, Conservative Party - Union Nationale (1923–1939)
- Joseph-Jean-Léopold Comeau, Liberal (1939–1944)
- Lionel-Alfred Ross, Liberal (1944–1960)
- George O'Reilly, Liberal (1960–1964)
- Claude Wagner, Liberal (1964–1966)

== Election results ==
1923 Quebec general election
Party	Candidate	Votes	%
Conservative	Pierre-Auguste Lafleur	4,801	73.26
Liberal	Joseph Élie	1,752	26.74

1927 Quebec general election
Party	Candidate	Votes	%
Conservative	Pierre-Auguste Lafleur	4,685	53.17
Liberal	Joseph-Alfred-Aquila Leclair	4,127	46.83

1931 Quebec general election
Party	Candidate	Votes	%
Conservative	Pierre-Auguste Lafleur	7,074	51.12
Liberal	Charles Norton Allen	5,942	42.94
Independent Liberal	Hervé Ferland	822	5.94

1935 Quebec general election
Party	Candidate	Votes	%
Conservative	Pierre-Auguste Lafleur	6,518	49.06
Liberal	Adélard Leduc	3,501	26.35
Independent Liberal	Hervé Ferland	3,268	24.60

1936 Quebec general election
Party	Candidate	Votes	%
Union Nationale	Pierre-Auguste Lafleur	7,502	56.23
Independent Liberal	Hervé Ferland	3,876	29.05
Co-operative Commonwealth	John Cuppello	1,469	11.01
Liberal	Henri-Joseph Duhamel	495	3.71

1939 Quebec general election
Party	Candidate	Votes	%
Liberal	Joseph-Jean-Léopold Comeau	4,449	50.91
Co-operative Commonwealth	Robert Louis Calder	2,513	28.76
Union Nationale	Pierre-Auguste Lafleur	1,415	16.19
Action libérale nationale	Georges Daoust	362	4.14

1944 Quebec general election
Party	Candidate	Votes	%
Liberal	Lionel-Alfred Ross	8,793	36.62
Co-operative Commonwealth	Louis-Philippe Lebel	6,039	25.15
Bloc populaire	Louis-Philippe Hurtubise	3,263	13.59
Co-operative Commonwealth	Hervé Ferland	3,015	12.56
Union Nationale	Pierre-Auguste Lafleur	2,899	12.07

1948 Quebec general election
Party	Candidate	Votes	%
Liberal	Lionel-Alfred Ross	12,639	52.74
Union Nationale	Pierre-Auguste Lafleur	6,622	27.63
Co-operative Commonwealth	William Dodge	3,544	14.79
Union des Électeurs	Donat Fortin	1,052	4.39
Co-operative Commonwealth	John Robertson	110	0.46

1952 Quebec general election
Party	Candidate	Votes	%
Liberal	Lionel-Alfred Ross	17,219	62.17
Union Nationale	William Herbert O'Connor	7,179	25.92
Co-operative Commonwealth	Thérèse Casgrain	2,857	10.31
Union des Électeurs	Donat Fortin	1,052	4.39
Independent workers	William Betchley	443	1.60
	Georges Grenier	Desisted	

1956 Quebec general election
Party	Candidate	Votes	%
Liberal	Lionel-Alfred Ross	20,175	70.12
Union Nationale	Albert Ouellette	6,814	23.68
Co-operative Commonwealth	William Dodge	1,785	6.20

1960 Quebec general election
Party	Candidate	Votes	%
Liberal	George O'Reilly	18,354	57.64
Union Nationale	Arthur Therrien	12,957	40.69
Independent Liberal	James Quinn	269	0.84
Communist	Frank Brenton	163	0.51
Independent Union Nationale	Kalil David	97	0.30

1962 Quebec general election
Party	Candidate	Votes	%
Liberal	George O'Reilly	21,208	65.98
Union Nationale	Laurent Gendron	10,934	34.02

Quebec provincial by-election, 1964
Party	Candidate	Votes	%
Liberal	Claude Wagner	18,203	68.48
Union Nationale	Arthur Therrien	8,231	30.97
Independent	Henri Paquet	147	0.55
