= Napierville-Laprairie =

Former provincial electoral district in Quebec, Canada

Quebec electoral district

Defunct provincial electoral district
- Legislature: National Assembly of Quebec
- District created: 1922
- District abolished: 1939
- District re-created: 1944
- District re-abolished: 1972
- First contested: 1923
- Last contested: 1970

Napierville-Laprairie (French pronunciation: [napjɛʁvil lapʁɛʁi]) was a former provincial electoral district in Quebec, Canada which elected members to the National Assembly of Quebec (known as the Legislative Assembly before 1968).

It was created for the 1923 election from parts of the Napierville and Laprairie electoral districts. It disappeared in the 1939 election and its successor electoral districts were Châteauguay-Laprairie and Saint-Jean–Napierville. However, both of those disappeared in the 1944 election and Napierville-Laprairie reappeared. Its last election was in 1970. It disappeared for good in the 1973 election and its successor electoral district was the re-created Laprairie (today written "La Prairie").

== Members of the Legislative Assembly ==
This riding has elected the following members of the National Assembly of Quebec:

- Joseph-Euclide Charbonneau, Liberal (1923–1936)
- Philippe Monette, Union Nationale (1936–1939)
- did not exist (1939–1944), see Saint-Jean–Napierville
- Hercule Riendeau, Union Nationale (1944–1962)
- Laurier Baillargeon, Liberal (1962–1966)

== Members of the National Assembly ==
- Laurier Baillargeon, Liberal (1966–1970)
- Paul Berthiaume, Liberal (1970–1973)
