= Roméo Fortin =

Canadian politician

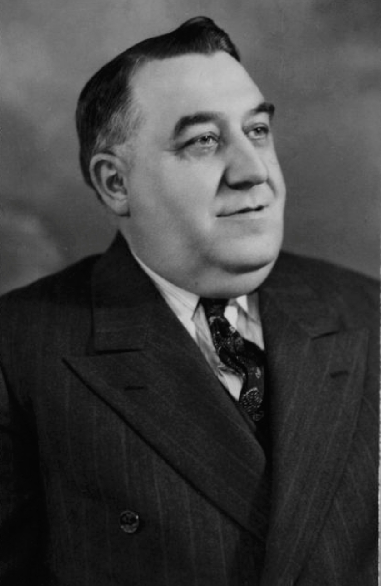

Member of the Legislative Assembly of Quebec for Châteauguay-Laprairie
- In office 1939–1944
- Preceded by: District created
- Succeeded by: District abolished

Personal details
- Born: May 16, 1886 Montreal, Quebec
- Died: August 16, 1953 (aged 67) Montreal, Quebec
- Party: Liberal

Roméo Fortin (May 16, 1886 – August 16, 1953) was a Canadian provincial politician.

Born in Montreal, Quebec, Fortin was the member of the Legislative Assembly of Quebec for Châteauguay-Laprairie from 1939 to 1944.
