= Paul Gauthier (politician) =

Canadian politician

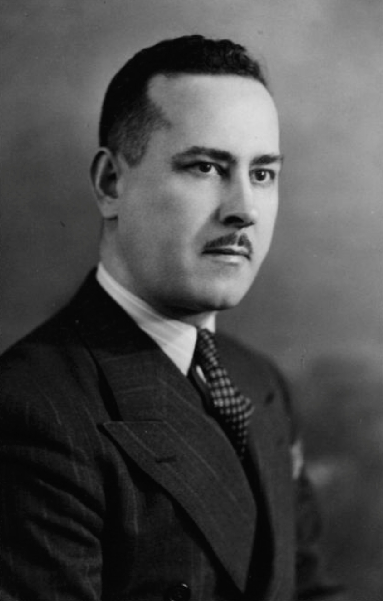

Member of the Legislative Assembly of Quebec for Montréal-Laurier
- In office 1939–1944
- Preceded by: Charles-Auguste Bertrand
- Succeeded by: André Laurendeau

Personal details
- Born: February 21, 1901 Montreal, Quebec, Canada
- Died: January 1, 1957 (aged 55) Montreal, Quebec
- Resting place: Notre Dame des Neiges Cemetery
- Party: Liberal

Paul Gauthier (French pronunciation: [pɔl ɡotje]; February 21, 1901 – January 1, 1957) was a Canadian provincial politician.

Born in Montreal, Quebec, Gauthier was the member of the Legislative Assembly of Quebec for Montréal-Laurier from 1939 to 1944.
