= Montréal–Saint-Henri =

Quebec electoral district

Defunct provincial electoral district
- Legislature: National Assembly of Quebec
- District created: 1922
- District abolished: 1965
- First contested: 1923
- Last contested: 1962

Montréal–Saint-Henri (French pronunciation: [mɔ̃ʁeal sɛ̃ ɑ̃ʁi]) was a former provincial electoral district in the Montreal region of Quebec, Canada that elected members to the Legislative Assembly of Quebec.

It was created for the 1923 election from most of the Montréal-Hochelaga electoral district, and parts of Jacques-Cartier and Westmount. Its final election was in 1962. It disappeared in the 1966 election and its successor electoral district was Saint-Henri. Part of the riding was redistributed into Sainte-Anne.

== Members of the Legislative Assembly ==
Legislature	Years	Member	Party
Riding created from Montréal-Hochelaga, Jacques-Cartier and Westmount
16th	1923–1927	Joseph Allan Bray	Conservative
17th	1927–1931	Alfred Leduc	Liberal
18th	1931–1935	Joseph-Maurice Gabias	Liberal
19th	1935–1936	Wilfrid-Eldège Lauriault	Action libérale nationale
20th	1936–1939	René Labelle	Union Nationale
21st	1939–1944	Émile Boucher	Liberal
22nd	1944–1948	Joseph-Hormidas Delisle	Union Nationale
23rd	1948–1952	Joseph-Hormidas Delisle	Union Nationale
24th	1952–1956	Philippe Lalonde	Liberal
25th	1956–1960	Philippe Lalonde	Liberal
26th	1960–1962	Philippe Lalonde	Liberal
27th	1962–1966	Philippe Lalonde	Liberal
Dissolved into Saint-Henri and Sainte-Anne
