= Saint-Jean (provincial electoral district) =

Provincial electoral district in Quebec, Canada

Coordinates: 45.30°N 73.27°W

Quebec electoral district

Provincial electoral district
- Legislature: National Assembly of Quebec
MNA
Gaétan Bédard
Parti Québécois
- District created: 1867
- District abolished: 1939
- District re-created: 1944
- First contested: 1867, 1944
- Last contested: 1939, 2026

Demographics
- Electors (2012): 58,109
- Area (km²): 243.6
- Census division: Le Haut-Richelieu (part)
- Census subdivision(s): Saint-Jean-sur-Richelieu (part), Saint-Blaise-sur-Richelieu

Saint-Jean (French pronunciation: [sɛ̃ ʒɑ̃]) is a provincial electoral district in the Montérégie region of the province of Quebec, Canada. It comprises most of Saint-Jean-sur-Richelieu and all of Saint-Blaise-sur-Richelieu.

It was created for the 1867 election (and an electoral district of that name existed earlier in the Legislative Assembly of the Province of Canada). It disappeared in the 1939 election and its successor electoral district was Saint-Jean–Napierville; however, it was re-created for the 1944 election.

In the change from the 2001 to the 2011 electoral map, its territory was unchanged.

In the 1994 election (on September 12) there was a tie between incumbent Liberal candidate Michel Charbonneau and PQ candidate Roger Paquin. A new election was held on October 24 and was won by Paquin by a margin of 532 votes.

== Bellwether district ==
The Saint-Jean district had been for a long time considered a reliable bellwether district. From 1897 to 1936, from 1944 to 2007, in 2012 and 2018, the Saint-Jean district elected a member of the governing party.

In 1994, the Saint-Jean district received high media coverage following the September 12 general election. As a consequence of a tie in the number of votes between Michel Charbonneau (PLQ) and Roger Paquin (PQ), no candidate is declared a winner. This unique situation in the history of Quebec politics necessitates a new district election that took place on October 24, 1994. The victory of the PQ candidate strengthens the perception that Saint-Jean is a bellwether district, for two reasons: the initial tie in the votes reflects, according to some commentators, the weak majority by the PQ over the liberals that were obtained provincially in the general election. Secondly, the victory of Paquin confirms that, once again, voters in Saint-Jean tend to vote for the party forming the government.

Even though Saint-Jean voters, since 2007, have selected some candidates forming the opposition party, the media sometimes still refer to it as a bellwether district.

Other provincial districts that are sometimes considered as bellwether include Terrebonne (Lanaudière), Trois-Rivières (Mauricie), and Chauveau (Capitale-Nationale).

The federal electoral district of Saint-Jean, which includes parts of the provincial Saint-Jean and Iberville districts, is also sometimes cited as a bellwether.

== Members of the Legislative Assembly / National Assembly ==
Legislature	Years	Member	Party
1st	1867–1871	Felix-Gabriel Marchand	Liberal
2nd	1871–1875	Felix-Gabriel Marchand	Liberal
3rd	1875–1878	Felix-Gabriel Marchand	Liberal
4th	1878–1881	Felix-Gabriel Marchand	Liberal
5th	1881–1886	Felix-Gabriel Marchand	Liberal
6th	1886–1890	Felix-Gabriel Marchand	Liberal
7th	1890–1892	Felix-Gabriel Marchand	Liberal
8th	1892–1897	Felix-Gabriel Marchand	Liberal
9th	1897–1900	Felix-Gabriel Marchand	Liberal
10th	1900–1904	Philippe-Honoré Roy	Liberal
11th	1904–1908	Philippe-Honoré Roy	Liberal
12th	1908–1910	Gabriel Marchand	Liberal
12th	1910–1912	Marcellin Robert	Liberal
13th	1912–1912	Jean Lomer Gouin	Liberal
13th	1913–1916	Marcellin Robert	Liberal
14th	1916–1919	Marcellin Robert	Liberal
15th	1919–1923	Alexis Bouthillier	Liberal
16th	1923–1927	Alexis Bouthillier	Liberal
17th	1927–1931	Alexis Bouthillier	Liberal
18th	1931–1935	Alexis Bouthillier	Liberal
19th	1935–1936	Alexis Bouthillier	Liberal
20th	1936–1939	Alexis Bouthillier	Liberal
Riding dissolved into Saint-Jean–Napierville
Riding re-created from Saint-Jean–Napierville
22nd	1944–1948	Jean-Paul Beaulieu	Union Nationale
23rd	1948–1952	Jean-Paul Beaulieu	Union Nationale
24th	1952–1956	Jean-Paul Beaulieu	Union Nationale
25th	1956–1960	Jean-Paul Beaulieu	Union Nationale
26th	1960–1962	Philodor Ouimet	Liberal
27th	1962–1966	Philodor Ouimet	Liberal
28th	1966–1969	Jérôme Proulx	Union Nationale
28th	1969–1969	Jérôme Proulx	Independent
28th	1969–1970	Jérôme Proulx	Parti Québécois
29th	1970–1973	Jacques Veilleux	Liberal
30th	1973–1976	Jacques Veilleux	Liberal
31st	1976–1981	Jérôme Proulx	Parti Québécois
32nd	1981–1985	Jérôme Proulx	Parti Québécois
33rd	1985–1989	Pierre Lorrain	Liberal
34th	1989–1994	Michel Charbonneau	Liberal
35th	1994–1998	Roger Paquin	Parti Québécois
36th	1998–2003	Roger Paquin	Parti Québécois
37th	2003–2007	Jean-Pierre Paquin	Liberal
38th	2007–2008	Lucille Méthé	Action démocratique
39th	2008–2012	Dave Turcotte	Parti Québécois
40th	2012–2014	Dave Turcotte	Parti Québécois
41st	2014–2018	Dave Turcotte	Parti Québécois
42nd	2018–2022	Louis Lemieux	Coalition Avenir Québec
43rd	2022–2026	Louis Lemieux	Coalition Avenir Québec
44th	2026–Present	Gaétan Bédard	Parti Québécois

== Election results ==
2026 Quebec general election
** Preliminary results — Not yet official **
Party	Candidate	Votes	%	±%
Parti Québécois	Gaétan Bédard	15,061	35.62	
Liberal	Patrice Léger-Bourgoin	7,906	18.70	
Coalition Avenir Québec	Yves Bisson	7,146	16.90	
Conservative	Luc Sanfaçon	6,950	16.44	
Québec solidaire	Pierre-Luc Lavertu	4,409	10.43	
Parti nul	Martin Boudreau	283	0.67	
Climat Québec	Denis Thériault	223	0.53	
Présence	Julie Larouche	191	0.45	
Démocratie directe	Jean-Charles Cléroux	109	0.26	
Total valid votes				
Total rejected ballots				
Turnout			69.81	
Electors on the lists			–	–
Parti Québécois gain from Coalition Avenir Québec		Swing		+
Source: Élections Québec

2022 Quebec general election
Party	Candidate	Votes	%	±%
Coalition Avenir Québec	Louis Lemieux	21,734	50.65	+11.15
Parti Québécois	Alexandre Girard-Duchaine	8,248	19.22	-11.76
Québec solidaire	Pierre-Luc Lavertu	6,334	14.76	+0.32
Conservative	Dominick Melnitzky	3,603	8.40	+7.53
Liberal	Benjamin Roy	2,565	5.98	-5.66
Climat Québec	Denis Thériault	290	0.68	–
Démocratie directe	Raymond Choquette	133	0.31	–
Total valid votes		42,907	98.35	–
Total rejected ballots		718	1.65	-0.22
Turnout		43,625	69.73	-1.55
Electors on the lists		62,562	–	–
Coalition Avenir Québec hold		Swing		+11.46

2018 Quebec general election
Party	Candidate	Votes	%	±%
Coalition Avenir Québec	Louis Lemieux	16,789	39.50	+8.42
Parti Québécois	Dave Turcotte	13,171	30.99	-1.45
Québec solidaire	Simon Lalonde	6,137	14.44	+7.94
Liberal	Vanessa Parent	4,946	11.64	-16.85
Green	Véronique Langlois	694	1.63	–
Conservative	Philippe Perreault	368	0.87	+0.29
Citoyens au pouvoir	Louis St-Jacques	240	0.56	–
New Democratic	Geneviève Ruel	159	0.37	–
Total valid votes		42,504	98.13	
Total rejected ballots		809	1.87	
Turnout		43,313	71.28	-0.39
Eligible voters		60,761		
Coalition Avenir Québec gain from Parti Québécois		Swing		+4.94
Source(s) "Rapport des résultats officiels du scrutin". Élections Québec.

2014 Quebec general election
Party	Candidate	Votes	%	±%
Parti Québécois	Dave Turcotte	13,486	32.44	-8.29
Coalition Avenir Québec	Serge Tremblay	12,923	31.08	-1.09
Liberal	Marie-Josée Denis	11,845	28.49	+8.56
Québec solidaire	Carole Lusignan	2,693	6.48	+2.28
Option nationale	Jade Bossé Bélanger	386	0.93	-0.78
Conservative	Maryse Grenier	243	0.58	
Total valid votes		41,576	97.83	
Total rejected ballots		921	2.17	
Turnout		42,497	71.67	
Electors on the lists		59,296		
Parti Québécois hold		Swing		-4.69

Reference for 2014 results:

2012 Quebec general election
Party	Candidate	Votes	%	±%
Parti Québécois	Dave Turcotte	18,304	40.73	+1.58
Coalition Avenir Québec	Yvan Berthelot	14,457	32.17	+13.96
Liberal	Martin Massé	8,955	19.93	-16.59
Québec solidaire	Carole Lusignan	1,886	4.20	+1.97
Option nationale	Félix Lemaire	770	1.71	
Conservative	Carmyn Girard	267	0.59	
Parti indépendantiste	Yvon Silva Aubé	190	0.42	-0.13
Quebec Citizens' Union	François Mailly	109	0.24	
Total valid votes		44,938	98.43	
Total rejected ballots		718	1.57	
Turnout		45,656	78.34	
Electors on the lists		58,282		
Parti Québécois hold		Swing		-6.19

^ Change CAQ change is from ADQ
Reference for 2012 results:

2008 Quebec general election
Party	Candidate	Votes	%	±%
Parti Québécois	Dave Turcotte	13,474	39.15	+9.88
Liberal	Jean-Pierre Paquin	12,568	36.52	+11.64
Action démocratique	Lucille Méthé	6,266	18.21	-24.01
Green	Eric Beaudry	1,034	3.00	–
Québec solidaire	Danielle Desmarais	768	2.23	-1.30
Parti indépendantiste	Martin Rioux	189	0.55	–
Independent	Guillaume Tremblay	118	0.34	-3.29

2007 Quebec general election
Party	Candidate	Votes	%	±%
Action démocratique	Lucille Méthé	17,189	42.22	+23.29
Parti Québécois	Dave Turcotte	11,916	29.27	-7.79
Liberal	Jean-Pierre Paquin	10,131	24.88	-15.87
Québec solidaire	Guillaume Tremblay	1,478	3.63	+2.15

2003 Quebec general election
Party	Candidate	Votes	%	±%
Liberal	Jean-Pierre Paquin	14,758	40.75	
Parti Québécois	Roger Paquin	13,423	37.06	
Action démocratique	Marc-André Legault	6,856	18.92	
UFP	Alexandre Boulerice	535	1.48	
Bloc Pot	Eric Bédard	462	1.28	
Independent	Jean Robert	112	0.31	
Independent	Raymond Martin	73	0.20	
Total valid votes		36,219		
Total rejected ballots				
Turnout				
Electors on the lists				
Liberal gain from Parti Québécois		Swing		+

Quebec provincial by-election, October 24, 1994
Party	Candidate	Votes	%	±%
Parti Québécois	Roger Paquin	15,680	43.80	+1.30
Liberal	Michel Charbonneau	15,148	42.30	-0.20
Action démocratique	Daniel Lefebvre	4,693	11.96	+1.14
New Democratic	Julien Patenaude	204	0.60	-1.00
Sovereignty	Réal Brunette	232	0.20	-0.40
Total valid votes		35,807	98.66	
Total rejected ballots		487	1.34	-1.61
Turnout		36,294	76.53	-5.48
Electors on the lists		47,426		
Parti Québécois gain from Liberal		Swing		+0.75

1994 Quebec general election
Party	Candidate	Votes	%	±%
Liberal	Michel Charbonneau	16,536	42.50	-11.10
Parti Québécois	Roger Paquin	16,536	42.50	+3.20
Action démocratique	Daniel Lefebvre	4,494	11.96	–
New Democratic	Julien Patenaude	638	1.60	-3.40
Natural Law	Anne Bélanger	313	0.80	–
Sovereignty	Réal Brunette	232	0.60	–
Equality	Richard Beaucage	145	0.40	–
Total valid votes		38,894	–	
Turnout		38,894	82.01	+3.85
Electors on the lists		47,426		
The result was declared void as a result of the tie and a subsequent by-election was held on October 24, 1994

== See also ==
- List of Quebec provincial electoral districts
- Canadian provincial electoral districts
