= Montréal-Laurier =

Electoral district in Quebec, Canada

Quebec electoral district

Defunct provincial electoral district
- Legislature: National Assembly of Quebec
- District created: 1912
- District abolished: 1965
- First contested: 1912
- Last contested: 1962

Montréal-Laurier (French pronunciation: [mɔ̃ʁeal loʁje]) was a former provincial electoral district in the Montreal region of Quebec, Canada that elected members to the Legislative Assembly of Quebec.

It was created for the 1912 election from part of Hochelaga electoral district. Its final election was in 1962. It disappeared in the 1966 election and its successor electoral district was Laurier.

== Members of the Legislative Assembly ==
- Napoléon Turcot, Liberal (1912–1919)
- Ernest Poulin, Liberal (1919–1923)
- Alfred Duranleau, Conservative Party (1923–1927)
- Ernest Poulin, Liberal (1927–1935)
- Zénon Lesage, Action liberale nationale (1935–1936)
- Charles-Auguste Bertrand, Liberal (1936–1939)
- Paul Gauthier, Liberal (1939–1944)
- André Laurendeau, Bloc populaire canadien (1944–1948)
- Paul Provençal, Union Nationale (1948–1954)
- Arsène Gagné, Union Nationale (1955–1960)
- René Lévesque, Liberal (1960–1966)
