= Richelieu-Verchères (provincial electoral district) =

Quebec electoral district

Defunct provincial electoral district
- Legislature: National Assembly of Quebec
- District created: 1939
- District abolished: 1944
- First contested: 1939
- Last contested: 1942 (by-election)

Richelieu-Verchères (French pronunciation: [ʁiʃ(ə)ljø vɛʁʃɛʁ]) was a former provincial electoral district in the province of Quebec, Canada.

It was created for the 1939 election from all of Verchères and part of Richelieu electoral districts. It existed for only that one general election and a 1942 by-election. It disappeared in the 1944 election and its successor electoral districts were the re-created Richelieu and Verchères.

== Members of the Legislative Assembly ==
- Félix Messier, Liberal (1939–1942)
- Joseph-Willie Robidoux, Liberal (1942–1944)
