= Charles-Auguste Bertrand =

Canadian lawyer, politician and judge (1890-1977)

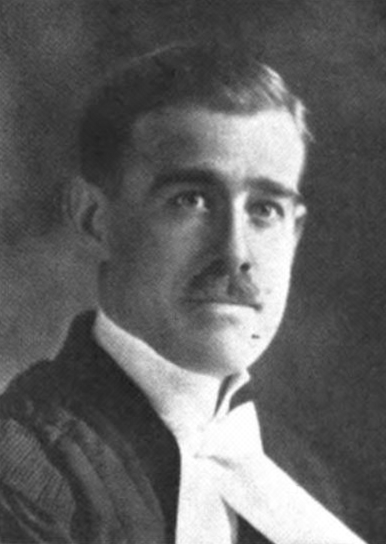
- Born: 29 March 1890; Saint-Vincent-de-Paul, Quebec, Canada
- Died: 21 September 1977 (aged 87); Outremont, Quebec, Canada
- Burial place: Notre Dame des Neiges Cemetery
- Education: Université Laval
- Occupation(s): Lawyer, politician, judge
- Spouse: Berthe Giroux (m. 1926)
- Children: 3

Charles-Auguste Bertrand (French pronunciation: [ʃaʁl oɡyst bɛʁtʁɑ̃]; 29 March 1890 – 21 September 1977) was a Canadian lawyer, politician, and judge.

== Biography ==
Charles-Auguste Bertrand was born in Saint-Vincent-de-Paul, Quebec on 29 March 1890. He earned a degree from Université Laval, and began practicing law on 15 January 1915.

He married Berthe Giroux on 22 November 1926, and they had three children.

A member of the Quebec Liberal Party, he was Attorney-General, Provincial Secretary, and Registrar in Adélard Godbout's government from 27 June to 26 August 1936.

Bertrand was a judge of the Superior Court of Quebec from 1940 until his retirement in 1965.

He died in Outremont on 21 September 1977, and was buried at Notre Dame des Neiges Cemetery in Montreal.
