= Premierships of Maurice Duplessis =

Part of the history of Quebec

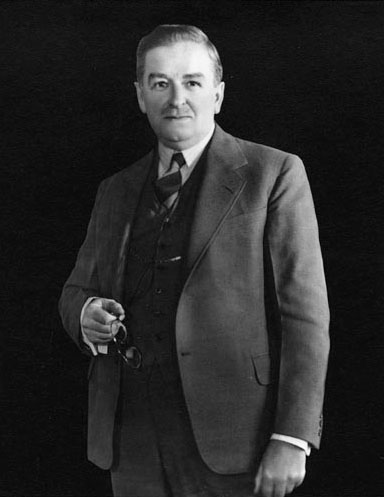
- Premierships of Maurice Duplessis
- Premier: Maurice Duplessis
- Party: Union Nationale
- Seat: Quebec City
- First term August 26, 1936 – November 8, 1939
- Monarchs: Edward VIII; George VI
- Election: 1936
- Appointed by: Ésioff-Léon Patenaude
- Constituency: Trois-Rivières
- Second term August 30, 1944 – September 7, 1959
- Monarchs: George VI; Elizabeth II
- Election: 1944; 1948; 1956; 1956
- Appointed by: Eugène Fiset
- Constituency: Trois-Rivières

Maurice Duplessis was Premier of Quebec, Canada, from 1936 to 1939 and again from 1944 to 1959 as leader of the Union Nationale (UN) caucus in the Legislative Assembly of Quebec, the lower house of the Quebec Legislature. The first term of the longest-serving premier of the province since Confederation lasted three years (1936–1939) and was interrupted when he lost a snap election in 1939. He returned to power in 1944 and ruled the province uninterruptedly until his death in September 1959, maintaining majorities in three following elections (1948, 1952 and 1956). The premier's death threw the Union Nationale into disarray. The next year, the party lost power to the Liberals under Jean Lesage, who reversed a lot of Duplessis's policies and radically changed Quebec's politics by leading the province through the Quiet Revolution.

Duplessis became premier on 17 August 1936, shortly after he took full control of the Union Nationale. It started as a coalition between the Action libérale nationale (ALN), composed of a group of dissident Liberal members of the Legislative Assembly (MLAs), and its junior partner, the Conservatives, of which Duplessis was leader prior to these parties' merger into the UN. He finished the consolidation of his grip over the new party, which he would maintain until his death. The first term proved difficult for Duplessis as the Great Depression spawned numerous problems on the economic front. Duplessis's first term marked the introduction of old-age pensions and minimum wages for almost all workers. He strengthened workplace accident protections, created the Ministry of Health and instituted a popular rural loan program. At the same time, borrowing soared to the point the federal government had to intervene to restrict it and the laissez-faire policies of his predecessors, which he previously promised to put an end to, were continued. Notably, Duplessis refused to nationalize the hydroelectric plants. A controversial act aimed to repress communists was passed during the first term, known as the Padlock Law, and the government passed regulations weakening organized labour.

During the second period of Duplessis governments, the economic situation improved thanks to the post–World War II expansion that the Western world entered into. Duplessis generally promoted a model of economic development with little state intervention, low taxation and very limited government-sponsored welfare. The budget was in the long term balanced. The province noted solid economic growth and much investment into the province's resources, usually by large out-of-province companies and with few conditions. Significant progress in rural electrification and building schools was noted during these fifteen years. He also approved the current flag of Quebec.

Duplessis was known for strong advocacy for provincial autonomy, to the point of refusing federal subsidies, investments and social programs in the province. The government cracked down on increasingly powerful trade unions as well as the Jehovah's Witnesses, while also maintaining a cozy (and often clientelist and corrupt) relationship with both business interests and the Catholic Church. The cooperation of the government with the highest tiers of the clergy (unlike in his first term) was particularly close, with many healthcare, social and education duties being delegated or shared with church officials. This, together with the government's authoritarian tendencies and staunch conservatism, led many contemporary observers to describe Duplessis's Quebec as a somewhat backward region relative to the rest of North America. Some of his strongest critics labelled the period the Grande Noirceur (Great Darkness).

== First government (1936–1939) ==
=== Composition ===
Composition of the first Duplessis government (1936–1939) (Note: The technical resignation of the cabinet in July 1938 to expel François Leduc is not taken into account)
Person	Government position	Date	Notes
Maurice Duplessis	Premier and President of the Executive Council	26 August 1936 – 8 November 1939	
Maurice Duplessis	Attorney General	26 August 1936 – 8 November 1939	
Maurice Duplessis	Minister of Roads	7 July 1938 – 30 November 1938	
Maurice Duplessis	Minister of Lands and Forests	23 February 1937 – 27 July 1938	
Martin Beattie Fisher	Treasurer	26 August 1936 – 8 November 1939	
Albiny Paquette	Provincial Secretary	26 August 1936 – 8 November 1939	
Albiny Paquette	Minister of Health	15 December 1936 – 8 November 1939	
Bona Dussault	Minister of Agriculture	26 August 1936 – 8 November 1939	
Henry Lemaître Auger	Minister of Colonization	26 August 1936 – 8 November 1939	
Onésime Gagnon	Minister of Mines, Hunting and Fisheries	26 August 1936 – 8 November 1939	Minister of Mines and Fisheries from 15 December 1936
John Samuel Bourque	Minister of Public Works	26 August 1936 – 8 November 1939	
John Samuel Bourque	Minister of Lands and Forests	27 July 1938 – 8 November 1939	
William Tremblay	Minister of Labour	26 August 1936 – 8 November 1939	
Oscar Drouin	Minister of Lands and Forests	26 August 1936 – 23 February 1937	Lost position due to his resignation from the Union Nationale
François Leduc	Minister of Roads	26 August 1936 – 7 July 1938	Expelled during a technical reorganization of the cabinet
Joseph Bilodeau	Minister of Municipal Affairs, Industry and Commerce	26 August 1936 – 8 November 1939	
Anatole Carignan	Minister of Roads	30 November 1938 – 8 November 1939	
Antonio Élie	Minister without portfolio	26 August 1936 – 8 November 1939	
Thomas Joseph Coonan	Minister without portfolio	26 August 1936 – 8 November 1939	
Gilbert Layton	Minister without portfolio	26 August 1936 – 8 November 1939	
Thomas Chapais	Minister without portfolio	26 August 1936 – 8 November 1939	From the Legislative Council

The first government of Maurice Duplessis was formed in peculiar circumstances. The Union Nationale at the time was far from a monolithic party, as it included both former ALN and Conservative members. Fourteen of these formed the cabinet. Onésime Gagnon, Duplessis's challenger in the 1933 Conservative leadership contest, was appointed Minister of Mines, Hunting and Fisheries, and four former Liberals received their ministerial seats; however, Philippe Hamel, one of ALN's main ideologues, was not offered a position in the provincial cabinet. Among other consequences of the 1936 election, Camillien Houde, who had a feud with Duplessis, unexpectedly decided to resign from his mayorship of Montreal, citing bad relations with the new Premier, despite a looming election three months later (the Union Nationale-backed candidate won it).

Duplessis immediately came into conflict his minister of roads, François Leduc, who was deeply critical of being forced to cooperate with the business interests of "friends of the party". (Note: In his letter to Le Devoir, Leduc complained that: "It's due to my will to align my administrative affairs to the principles espoused by the Premier in his communications with the press that I am no longer the Minister of Roads. I believed that it was my duty to conduct public affairs with all honesty and efficiency that could be seen in any well-managed organization, even if, in order to achieve the foal, it was needed to sacrifice some friends of the party, who are more interested in their personal position rather than in the province's advancement, and even if it was needed – the highest sacrifice – to part ways with the person who, for such a long time, was my boss. I did not want, in the domain of road construction, to let reign a dictature controlled by two or three friendly businessmen of yours, who had their will imposed on the government, rather than who executed government orders.") Leduc, however, refused to resign. Duplessis, who accused the minister of roads of various "abuses", then decided to submit a request to the Lieutenant Governor to dismiss the whole government, only to secretly assemble it later from the same members but without the recalcitrant minister. It was the first time ever since Confederation that a premier used this method to fire a government minister. Five nationalist MLAs led by Philippe Hamel, and which also included Oscar Drouin, Ernest Grégoire, René Chaloult and Adolphe Marcoux, also parted ways with Duplessis. They quit the Union Nationale altogether and founded the short-lived Parti National after Duplessis failed to keep up on his electoral pledges to fend off foreign capital. Duplessis thus assumed the interim positions of the minister of roads (from Leduc) and minister of lands and forests (from Drouin). This was in addition to the position of Premier of Quebec and the Attorney General of Quebec, a position which he appointed himself for the whole duration of his time in office.

Duplessis's Union Nationale wins the 1936 general election and forms its first government

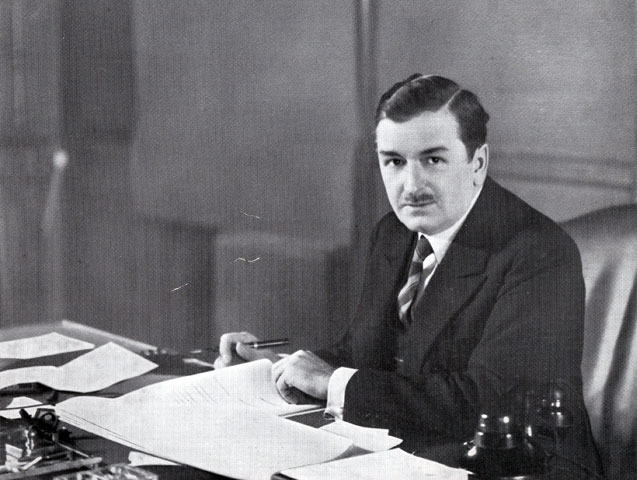
The first official photo of Maurice Duplessis as premier of Quebec, 1936 (a 1938 copy is shown)

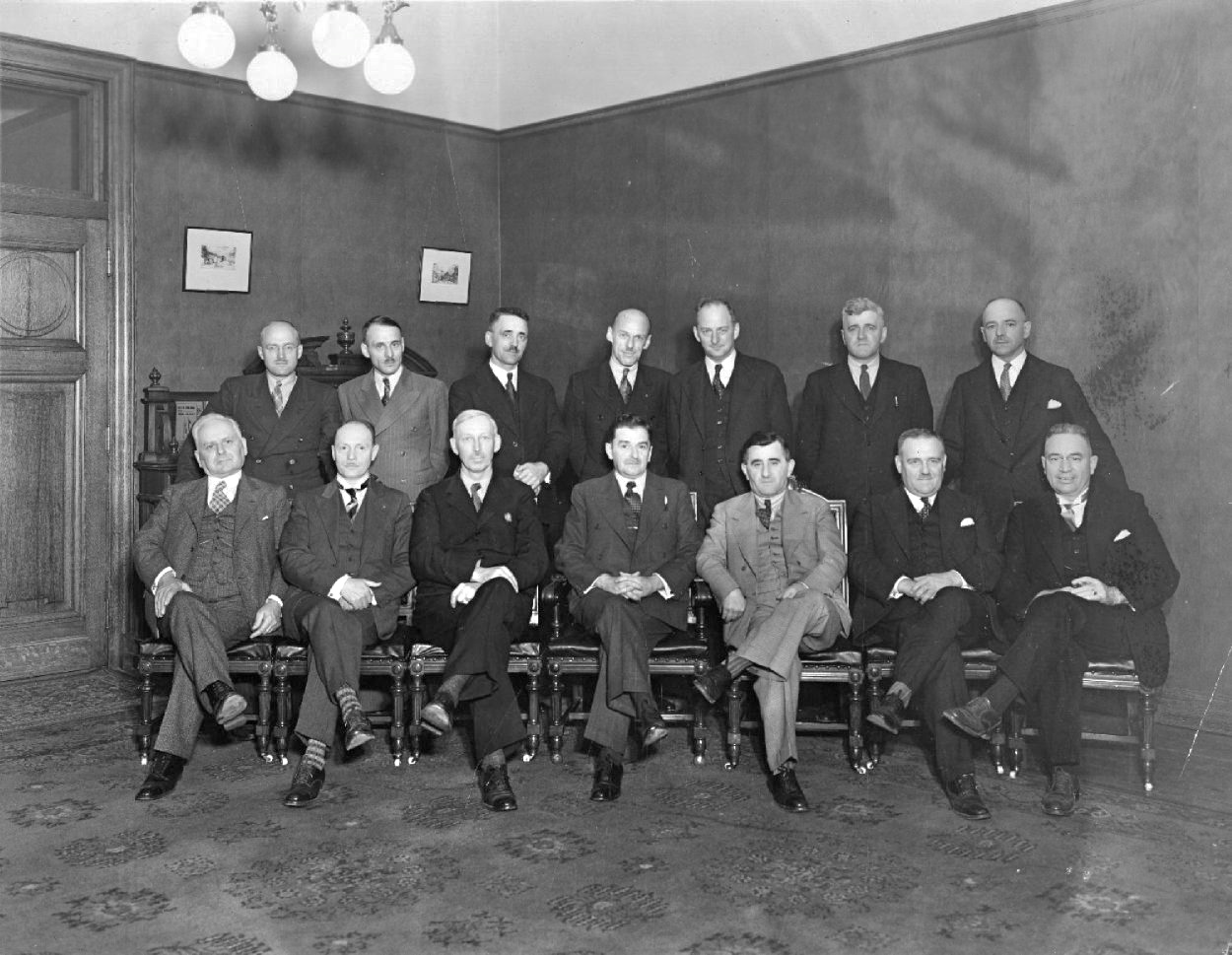
The photo of the first Duplessis's government, about the date when the ministers were sworn in, i.e. August 1936 (Note: Seated in the front row, from left to right: Henry Lemaître Auger (Minister of Colonization), Albiny Paquette (Minister of Health and Secretary of Quebec), Martin Fisher (Treasurer), Maurice Duplessis (Premier and Attorney General), Oscar Drouin (Lands and Forests), Onésime Gagnon (Mines; Hunting and Fisheries), William Tremblay (Labour). Standing in the second row, from right to left: Gilbert Layton (minister without portfolio), Joseph Bilodeau (Municipal Affairs; Industry and Commerce), Bona Dussault (Agriculture), John Samuel Bourque (Public Works), François Leduc (Roads), Antonio Élie (without portfolio) and Thomas Joseph Coonan (without portfolio).)

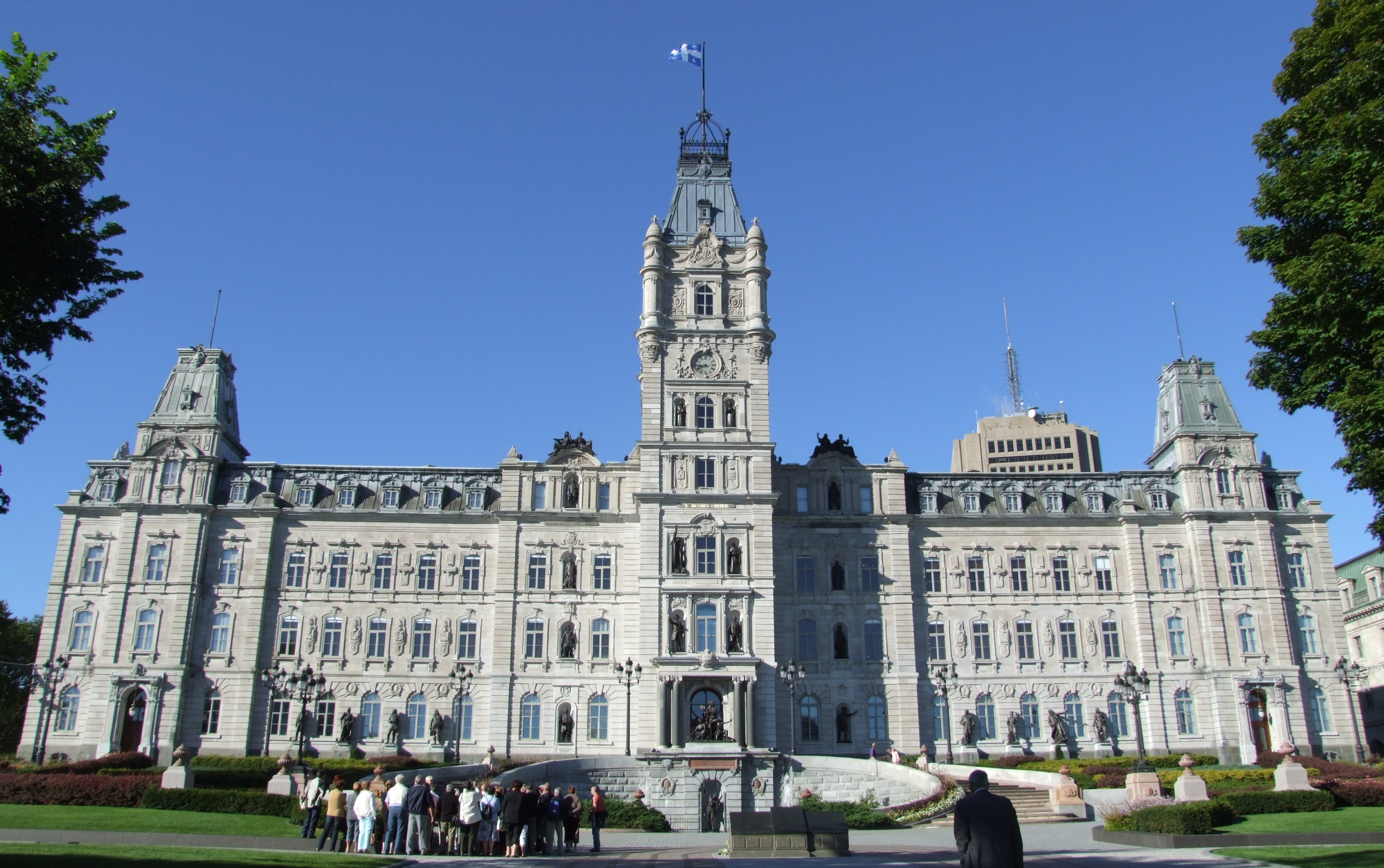
A photo of the Parliament Building of Quebec (taken in 2007), the place where Duplessis was working for more than thirty years

Logo of the Union Nationale (1935–1989). Until his death in 1959, Maurice Duplessis led the party. Under his leadership, it won five elections out of seven.

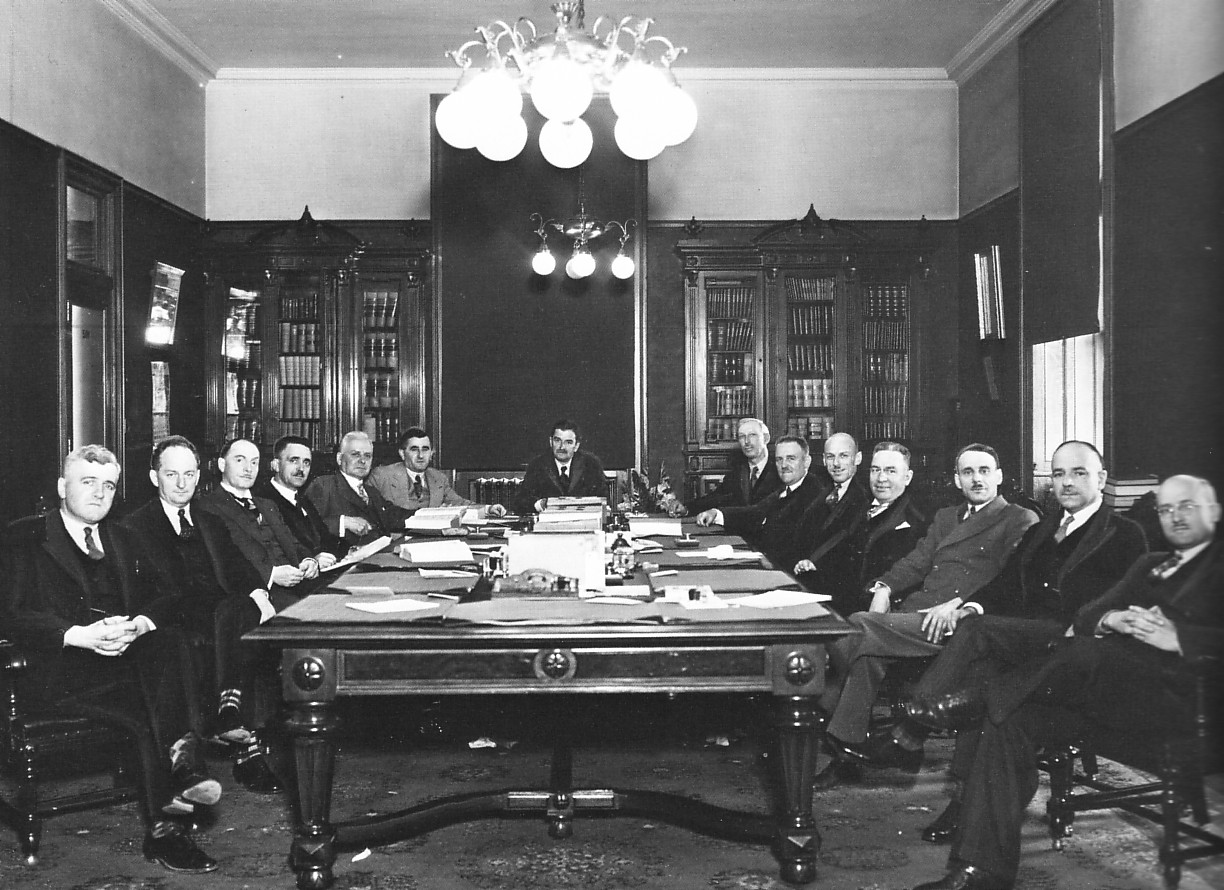
The Cabinet of Quebec, 1936

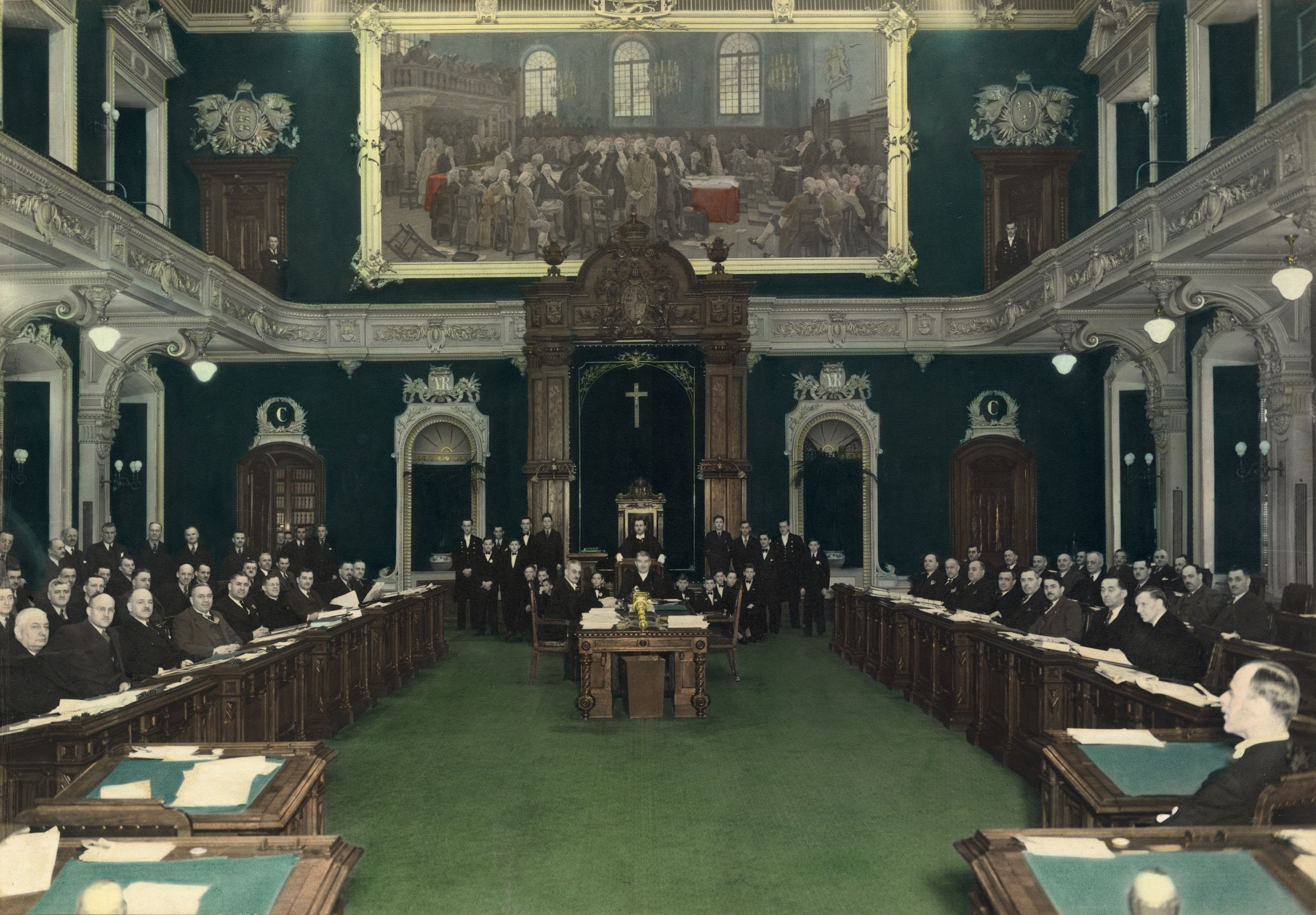
The Legislative Assembly seating in 1936. The crucifix, seen above the rostrum of the Speaker, was installed on October 7, 1936, and stayed there for almost 83 years. Its presence sparked debate about secularism in Quebec, until the National Assembly passed a motion to remove it.

=== Economical and welfare policies ===
During his speech from the throne, Duplessis emphasized that his priority was giving "[advantage to] human capital over money capital". He announced four measures seeking to implement his agenda: creation of the Farm Credit Bureau (Office du crédit agricole du Québec), cancellation of the so-called Dillon law (which had been adopted to restrict the possibility of challenging election results, as the Conservatives sought to do when they lost in 1931), adoption of an old-age pension program together with the federal government and enhancement of the law on workplace accidents, as well as a ban on ministers to sit on corporate boards of directors. In particular, the rural loan program proved extremely popular in the countryside, which was a factor in the party's longevity. Duplessis started it due to his conviction that agriculture still was the main driver of economic progress in the province.

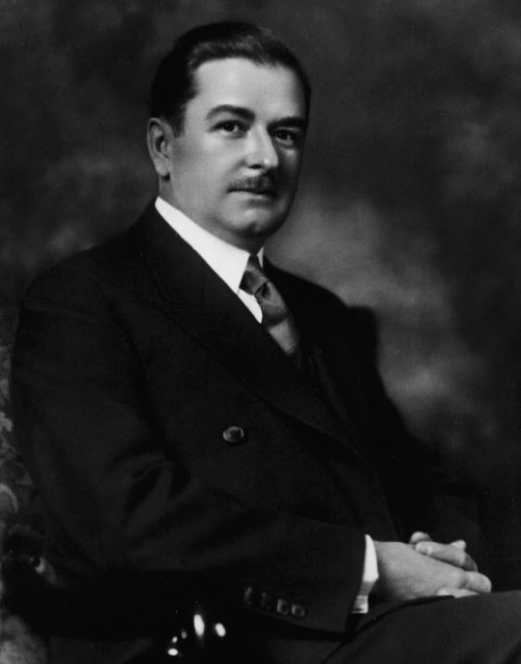
Duplessis in 1938

This was, however, where the similarities with the electoral pledges ended. Despite assurances that he would reform the economy, the policies he pursued largely mirrored those of the Liberals his party had just deposed. He also opened the province to more foreign capital, notably to Robert R. McCormick, an American media mogul and an outspoken critic of the New Deal policies, who built a new paper plant in Baie-Comeau. (Note: Bernard Saint-Aubin, who wrote a political biography of Duplessis, stressed that the Premier "admired the Englishmen and the Americans, who had an air of liveliness in business affairs. He knew that the province needed financial behemoths – most of which were not Francophone – so that it prospered and so that jobs were created for the Quebeckers. In the periods of prosperity, no one topples governments, which Duplessis also knew. The Union Nationale, while in opposition, promised to destroy the grip of foreign capitalists on Quebec's economy, but now that it was in charge, Duplessis, being a realist, renewed his predecessor's policies. Duplessis continued Taschereau just like Taschereau continued Gouin. The premier simply followed the traditional policies of the former leaders of Quebec, who, since the late 19th century, turned to foreign money to develop the province.") Duplessis also resented the idea of nationalization of hydroelectric plants, as some ALN members proposed while the Union Nationale was still a coalition. This attracted accusations of hypocrisy from his adversaries, and even some members of his own party were not happy with what they saw was "selling off Quebec to the foreigners". These MLAs formed the Parti National.

His social welfare record in the first term was somewhat progressive. Old-age pensions and workplace accident protections were instituted during his first year in office, as were some public works projects, such as the completion of the Montreal Botanical Garden. The Union Nationale was the first Quebec cabinet to include the Ministry of Health, and it also financed the new Institute of Microbiology and Hygiene of Montreal, a research facility similar to Paris's Pasteur Institute. In line with the Catholic Church's teaching, Duplessis launched a program of assistance to needy mothers who were married (but not to other women), as well as to the blind and the orphaned. Despite these initiatives, the condition of Quebec's economy did not improve during his term as the effects of the Great Depression were still strong. Duplessis was thus forced to look to the debt markets for money. Public debt ballooned from $150 million to $286 million during his three years in power (C$3.328×10^{9} to C$6.099×10^{9} in 2025 dollars), which was the highest rate of debt accumulation since Confederation to that date. Ottawa therefore started controlling the province's borrowing, which Duplessis decried as an invasion on Quebec's fiscal autonomy.

Duplessis adopted the Fair Wage Act (French: Loi des salaires raisonnables) and created the Fair Wage Board. Before the Fair Wage Act, only women were entitled to a minimum wage, but Duplessis extended this to almost all workers for the first time. The Board determined "fair wages" ($4.80–$24 per week, which is $102.36-$511.79 in 2025) using a complex scheme that sorted employees according to the type of company they worked for, the nature of their job and the job class they belonged to. The law was far from ideal. It did not apply to railway, agriculture workers and home servants. Trade unions were reluctant to embrace these regulations as they preferred collective bargaining, which led to agreements to which the Fair Wage Act did not apply. Moreover, the government's application of the law was patchy because employers, including government agencies, were repeatedly granted exemptions from existing orders of the Board. (Note: For instance, when the government did not have money to pay hospitals, it asked the Board to rescind minimum wage protections afforded to healthcare workers. The Act also did not apply to workers engaged in public works organized by the government.) In some cases, the ordinances were used to effectively suppress wage increases. The patchwork of regulations, exemptions and cancellations of orders made enforcement such a nightmare that the Board struggled to interpret its own orders, which often lacked consistency. By 1940, minimum wages were raised above Ontario levels, but almost a fifth of workers were not paid what they were due by law, partially because the workers had little awareness of their rights.

=== Societal issues ===
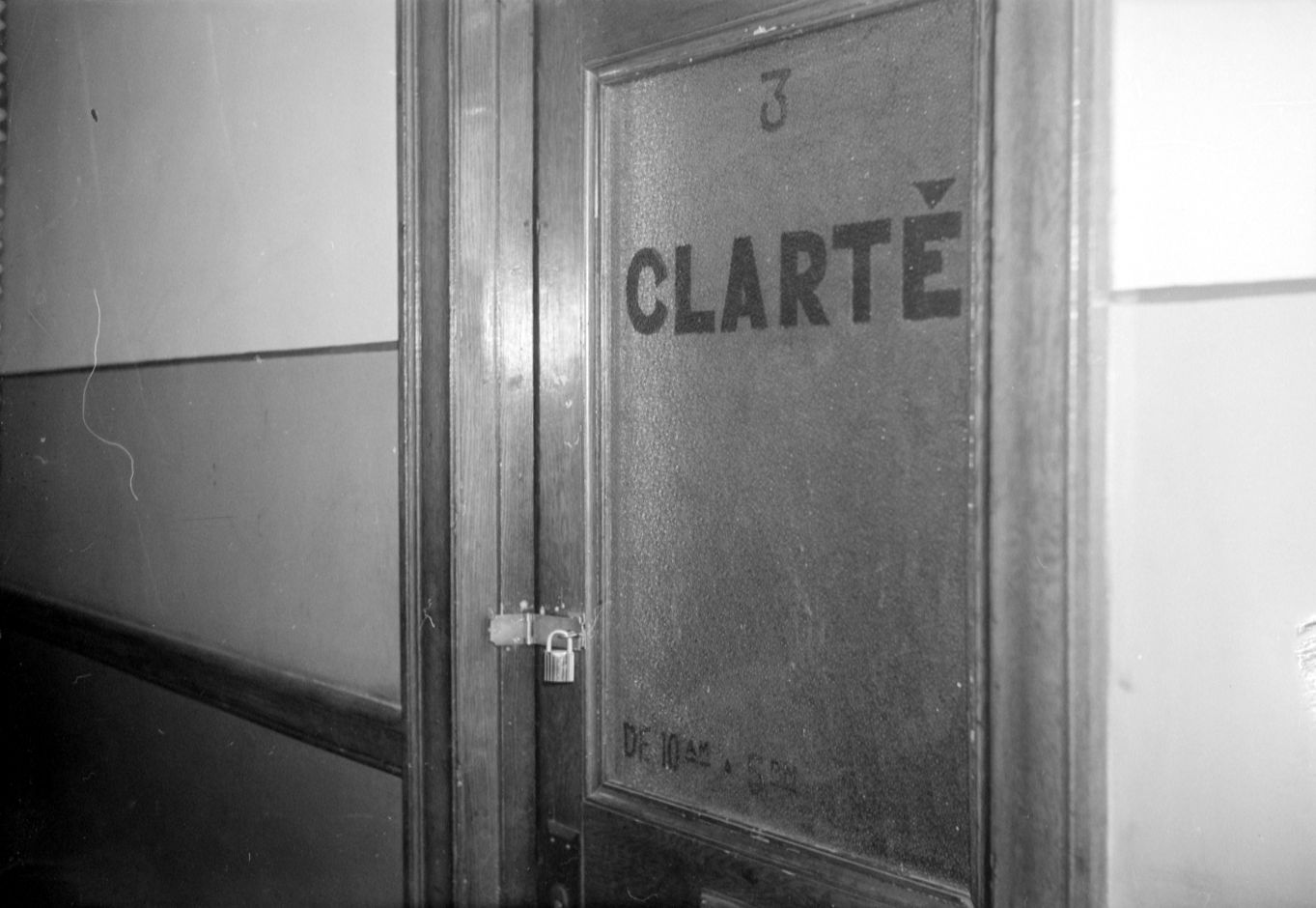
The office of La Clarté, a weekly publication of the Quebec branch of the Communist Party of Canada, was padlocked in 1937 on the order of provincial authorities

A deeply devout person, Duplessis regularly engaged with Catholic Church officials and enticed them to support him by making numerous symbolic moves. For instance, when Brother André, whom he met in his elementary school in Montreal, died on 6 January 1937, he had a mausoleum built in his honour. The following year, in his opening speech to the National Eucharistic Congress in Quebec City, Duplessis stressed he did not accept the ideas coming from the French Revolution and emphasized his Catholic faith. Duplessis was the premier who introduced a crucifix to the debate hall of the Legislative Assembly. This could have been a nod to his father's ultramontanism, but it was more probably a continuation of Louis-Alexandre Taschereau's policies, who introduced a "universal" prayer in 1922 and also ordered that crucifixes be placed in Quebec courtrooms. At the same time, the premier did not intend to give as much power to the clergy as it had under Taschereau, throwing the Church out of the lawmaking process related to social and moral issues it used to have access to. In fact, only part of the clergy supported Duplessis at the time, and many more preferred the Parti National's agenda.

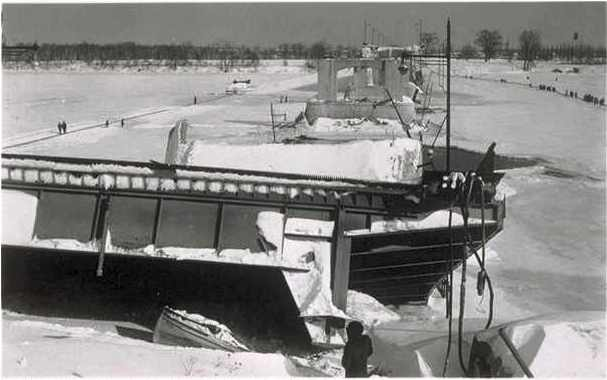
Duplessis Bridge in Trois-Rivières on 31 January 1951. While the bridge, only 3.5 years old at the time of its failure, collapsed because of the poor quality of materials used, the premier claimed that Communist saboteurs destroyed it

The defining feature of his first term was the fierce opposition to communism, something that would persist in later terms, too. Duplessis said that "communism must be considered the top public enemy, despised and to be despised"; Duplessis's hatred of the ideology was so strong that in 1956, in response to the news that Polish eggs arrived in Montreal, his campaign took a full-page ad saying: "Quebeckers are forced to eat communist eggs!" Duplessis condemned Canada's recognition of the communist government of Poland and triggered a diplomatic crisis when he refused to return valuable historical artifacts that were deposited in Canada for the duration of World War II, including the Jagiellonian tapestries and Szczerbiec, the coronation sword of the Polish kings. He justified his refusal by stating that "Stalin and his accomplices, including the usurper government of Poland, [...] want[ed] to establish an atheist regime, a godless government which is repugnant to the province of Quebec." (Note: In original French: "Staline et ses complices, dont le gouvernement usurpateur de Pologne, [qui] veulent établir en Europe et à travers le monde un régime athée, un gouvernement de sans-Dieu qui répugne profondément à la province de Québec") He even had his agents transport the artifacts to another location under the nose of the Royal Canadian Mounted Police so that Canadian authorities could not send them to Poland.

In line with his ideas and with unanimous support of the Liberals, in 1937 the Legislature passed the Act to Protect the Province Against Communistic Propaganda (French: Loi protégeant la province contre la propagande communiste), better known as the Padlock Law (French: La loi du cadenas). It allowed the Attorney General (Duplessis) to prosecute people propagating Bolshevism or communism, which were not defined in the law, on private or public property and banned any publications "advocating or trying to advocate" the ideologies. The law received positive reactions from the general public as well as the clergy, but was fiercely criticized in the Anglophone press, which tied its enaction with Cardinal Villeneuve's supposed undue influence on the government. It was often arbitrarily used against left-leaning trade unions and the clergy Duplessis did not like, and the law provided no appeal to those locked out of their houses. The frequent attacks on communists had an additional side effect of increased violence against the Jewish community, whose members were often equated to communists. The law also spurred the creation of new human rights organizations, such as a relatively short-lived Canadian Civil Liberties Union, whose main purpose was to protect against the effects of the act and to lobby for its disallowance, which was refused in June 1938. The repression of communists was popular after the war as well. The Padlock Law was only struck down in 1957 by the Supreme Court of Canada in Switzman v Elbling as an infringement on the federal government's powers to pass criminal statutes.

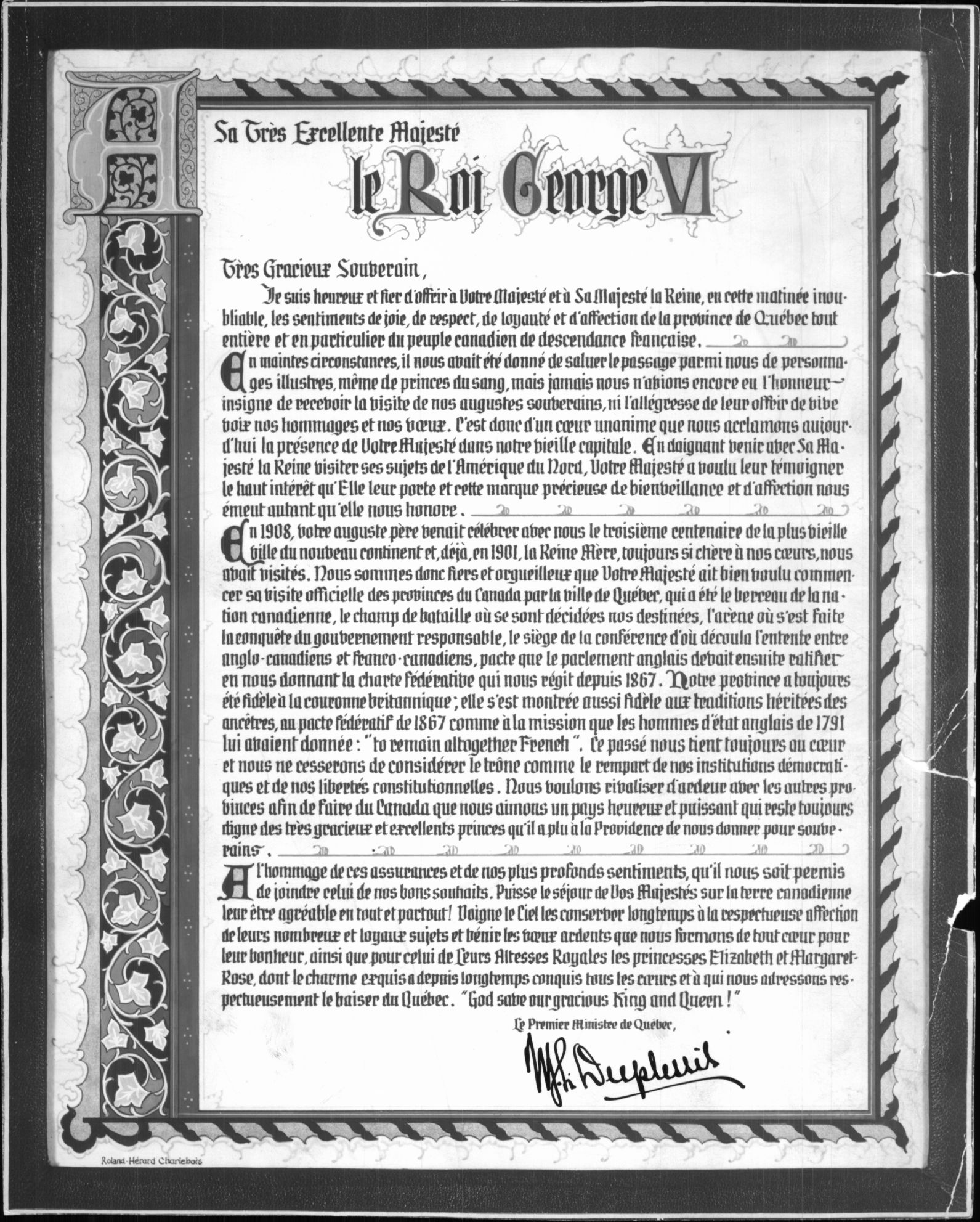
A letter addressed to George VI in 1939, assuring that Quebec would remain loyal to the king

Another issue of his government was the approach of World War II and conscription-related issues. On the one hand, Duplessis tried to assure George VI of his province's loyalty to the Crown during the king's visit in May 1939, but on the other, many French Canadians opposed conscription when it was announced in 1917. Therefore, Duplessis, together with his aides, decided to make use of the electorate's distrust of federal war plans and general anti-conscription attitude of Quebeckers to announce a snap election, hoping to confuse the Liberals (then in power in Ottawa) and to persuade the electorate that the conscription was a means to take over provincial competencies. However, the plan fell flat as provincial Liberals (and Camillien Houde) also announced their opposition to conscription; finally, William Mackenzie King, the Prime Minister of Canada, declared that no one would be forcibly drafted. At the same time, the Duplessis's government was seen as confused and unable to implement coherent policies, and the Liberals pointed to the bad state of the economy. The 1939 election was disastrous for the Union Nationale–it only received 39.1% of votes, but, more importantly, it got 15 out of 86 seats, losing the premiership to Adélard Godbout's Liberals.

== Second government (1944–1959) ==
Composition of the second Duplessis government (1944–1959) (Note: The technical resignation of the cabinet in July 1938 to expel François Leduc is not taken into account)
Person	Government position	Date	Notes
Maurice Duplessis	Premier and President of the Executive Council	30 August 1944 – 7 September 1959	Died in office
Maurice Duplessis	Attorney General	30 August 1944 – 7 September 1959	Died in office
Onésime Gagnon	Treasurer	30 August 1944 – 24 January 1958	Minister of Finances from 28 November 1951; resigned to become Lieutenant Governor
Antoine Rivard	Solicitor General	12 April 1950 – 7 September 1959	
Antoine Rivard	Minister of Transport and Communications	30 June 1954 – 7 September 1959	
John Samuel Bourque	Minister of Water Resources	21 July 1945 – 30 April 1958	
John Samuel Bourque	Minister of Lands and Forests	30 August 1944 – 30 April 1958	
John Samuel Bourque	Minister of Finances	27 January 1958 – 7 September 1959	
Omer Côté	Provincial Secretary	30 August 1944 – 14 March 1956	Resigned to become a judge in the Court of Sessions of the Peace for the district of Terrebonne
Roméo Lorrain	Minister of Public Works	30 August 1944 – 7 September 1959	
Roméo Lorrain	Provincial Secretary	24 April 1956 – 26 September 1956	
Yves Prévost	Minister of Municipal Affairs	15 July 1953 – 26 September 1956	
Yves Prévost	Provincial Secretary	26 September 1956 – 7 September 1959	
Bona Dussault	Minister of Municipal Affairs	30 August 1944 – 29 April 1953	Died in office
Paul Dozois	Minister of Municipal Affairs	26 September 1956 – 7 September 1959	
Antonio Barrette	Minister of Labour	30 August 1944 – 7 September 1959	
Antonio Talbot	Minister of Roads	30 August 1944 – 7 September 1959	
Laurent Barré	Minister of Agriculture	30 August 1944 – 7 September 1959	
Albiny Paquette	Minister of Health and Social Welfare	30 August 1944 – 17 August 1947	
Albiny Paquette	Minister of Health	18 September 1946 – 5 November 1958	
Arthur Leclerc	Minister of State	5 August 1952 – 7 September 1959	
Arthur Leclerc	Minister of Health	5 November 1958 – 7 September 1959	
Paul Sauvé	Minister of Social Welfare and Youth	18 September 1946 – 7 September 1959	On 15 January 1959, the ministry was split into the Ministry of Social Welfare and the Ministry of Youth; he headed both until Duplessis's death
Camille-Eugène Pouliot	Minister of Hunting	30 August 1944 – 7 September 1959	The two ministries were merged into the Ministry of Hunting and Fisheries on 18 December 1958
Camille-Eugène Pouliot	Minister of Maritime Fisheries	30 August 1944 – 7 September 1959	The two ministries were merged into the Ministry of Hunting and Fisheries on 18 December 1958
Joseph-Damase Bégin	Minister of Colonization	30 August 1944 – 7 September 1959	
Jean-Paul Beaulieu	Minister of Industry and Commerce	30 August 1944 – 7 September 1959	
Jonathan Robinson	Minister of Mines	30 August 1944 – 11 October 1948	Died in office
Charles Daniel French	Minister of Mines	15 December 1948 – 3 May 1954	Died in office
William McOuat Cottingham	Minister of Mines	2 June 1954 – 7 September 1959	
Daniel Johnson Sr.	Minister of Water Resources	30 April 1958 – 7 September 1959	
Jean-Jacques Bertrand	Minister of Lands and Forests	30 April 1958 – 7 September 1959	
Thomas Chapais	Minister without portfolio	30 August 1944 – 15 June 1946	From the Legislative Council; died in office
Joseph-Théophile Larochelle	Minister without portfolio	30 August 1944 – 29 December 1948	Resigned to become appointed to the Legislative Council
Joseph-Hormisdas Delisle	Minister without portfolio	30 August 1944 – 16 July 1952	Defeated in the 1952 general election
Patrice Tardif	Minister without portfolio	30 August 1944 – 16 July 1952	Defeated in the 1952 general election
Marc Trudel	Minister without portfolio	30 August 1944 – 16 July 1952	Defeated in the 1952 general election
Tancrède Labbé	Minister without portfolio	30 August 1944 – 13 December 1956	Died in office
Antonio Élie	Minister without portfolio	30 August 1944 – 7 September 1959	
Wilfrid Labbé	Minister of State	5 August 1952 – 7 September 1959	
Jacques Miquelon	Minister of State	5 August 1952 – 7 September 1959	
Gérard Thibeault	Minister of State	5 November 1958 – 7 September 1959	

=== Political atmosphere ===
Following a five-year hiatus, the Union Nationale, which was running on a nationalist, conservative, anti-war, anti-refugee and pro-business platform, narrowly recaptured control of the Legislative Assembly. They won 48 out of 90 seats thanks to vote-splitting between the Liberals and the Bloc populaire. The now-opposition Liberals, however, initially dismissed the return of Duplessis as a short-term venture due to his narrow majority in the lower chamber of the Quebec Legislature and his lack of control of the Legislative Council, the upper chamber of the legislature whose members were appointed. This thwarted some of his initial proposals, such as the one that would have introduced a luxury tax in 1945. Despite these obstacles, Duplessis would rule the province until his death.

Duplessis was the third and last long-serving premier prior to the Quiet Revolution. Unlike in his first years of government, the conditions for the second term improved immensely. After the end of World War II, Canada, along with other nations, entered a period of strong economic expansion. This helped create one of the most stable political environments in the country's history, as evidenced by the long governments of Joey Smallwood (Newfoundland, 1949–1972), W. A. C. Bennett (British Columbia, 1952–1972) and Tommy Douglas (Saskatchewan, 1944–1961). Duplessis profited from the favourable conditions, but his support was also in many respects due to the internal political climate of Quebec as well as some campaign innovations.

==== Style of governance ====
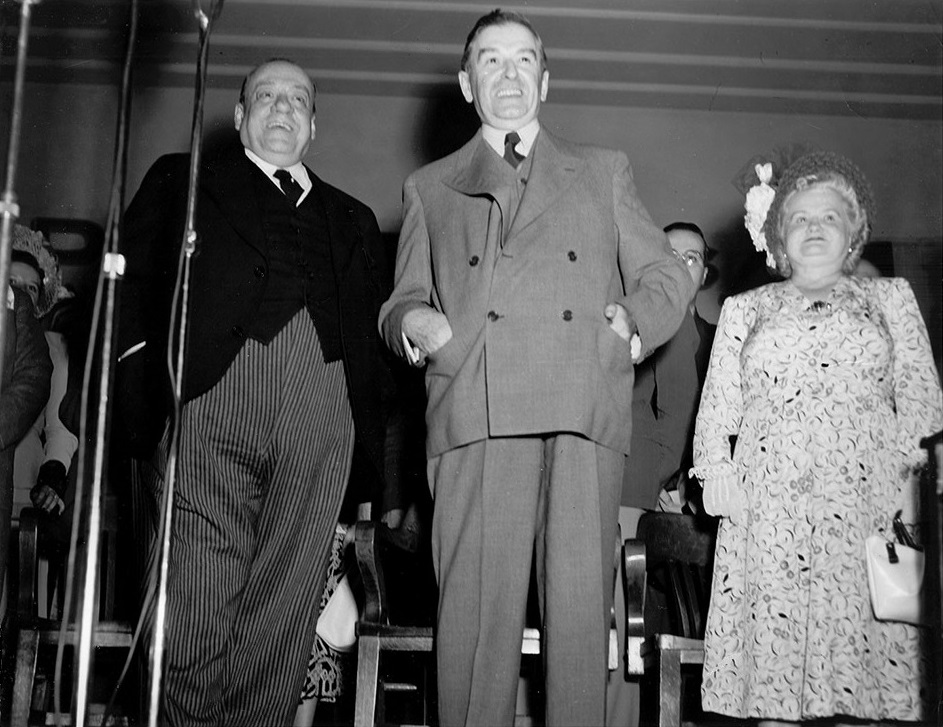
Maurice Duplessis (centre) seen with Camillien Houde (left) during a rally just before the 1948 election. Houde's wife appears to the right

Even though later in his life, he denounced his political opponents at any possible occasion. Duplessis initially tried to show himself as being above partisan politics and as a big-tent politician. In 1936, Duplessis asserted that he was "not blue, not red, not a Tory, [but] national". He also tried to appear not to be beholden only to his base electorate in the countryside. Indeed, his voters and supporters included other groups such as the clergy, traditional elites, Quebec nationalists, the business community and even parts of the working class. Notably, though, English-speaking Montrealers generally voted Liberal, as they resented what they considered as excessive preoccupation with provincial autonomy. French-Canadian university students were also generally against the policies of Duplessis.

Duplessis wielded considerable charisma during his life. Léon Dion suggested in 1993 that he was one of the two charismatic premiers in the history of Quebec with considerable impact on the province, the other being René Lévesque. Duplessis, who said he was "married to the province", cared about his image as being just a normal person. It was not rare for him to attend christening, marriage or childbirth ceremonies. During his speeches, he would often use simple expressions that would strike the imagination of assembled crowds and sway the masses in his favour.

While populist elements of Duplessis's government are undeniable, the extent to which they defined or influenced the party is debated. George Swan and several other authors simply described him as a populist politician. Pierre Laporte additionally said that Duplessis would often disdainfully refer to the intellectuals as "living in the clouds". Frédéric Boily also named Duplessis, alongside Camillien Houde, with whom Duplessis reconciled in 1948, as founding fathers of French Canadian populist tradition, but he also argued that Union Nationale's populism was "incomplete". Boily explains that while the party definitely tried to appeal to the masses and used populist rhetoric, it did not argue for a profound revolution within the political system it was operating in and did not change the system once it was in power.

In any case, Duplessis's charisma, strongarm governance tactics and his outsized importance earned him the nickname of "Le Chef" ("The Boss"). He was at the centre of all of the decisionmaking of the government, which Conrad Black characterized thus:

Under Duplessis, ministerial orders-in-council were more than just a formality. Every Wednesday morning the ministers assembled in the cabinet room in advance of Duplessis. They were never late and almost never absent. When Duplessis entered, they leapt to their feet and remained on their feet while the Prime Minister slowly made his way the length of the room to the head of the cabinet table. Then the ministers, in order of seniority, would present the orders whose adoption they wished, like schoolboys presenting essays. Duplessis, who possessed an astounding facility for this sort of legal work, would rapidly scan each one and initial those he approved. This ritual was repeated every Wednesday morning for 15 years, with the exception of election campaigns, and Duplessis retained always a profound cognizance of the guts of every department.

— Conrad Black, Duplessis, p. 308

The cabinet ministers were generally reduced to mere executors of Duplessis's political vision and their tasks were extensively micromanaged by him. He notably banned his vice-ministers from meeting each other, fearing that provincial affairs would slip out of his control. As Leslie Roberts says, the control was so intense that even during his vacation in Bermuda, Duplessis would regularly phone his ministers to give instructions. In the words of Télesphore-Damien Bouchard, then-leader of the opposition, this rule was "the only portable dictatorship in the democratic world". The administrative state was very fragmented, if ever present, and there was no interest in a professional cadre of public servants. Under Duplessis, many provincial-level government agencies that were supposed to be functioning by law did not, had numerous vacancies or acted in very unusual or opaque ways. (Note: For example, in budgetary matters, the Provincial Auditor had a role in approving government expenditures because no such expenses could be authorized by the government without the Auditor's clearance; but also the same person then had to audit the government's management of finances he had previously approved. The Treasury Office, a cabinet organ that advised on government finances, and the Public Accounts Committee of the Legislative Assembly would not meet in 1938–1960 and 1940–1960, respectively. Moreover, the three-person Civil Service Commission only had one commissioner under Duplessis.) James Gow suggests Duplessis likely intended it to be this way since he did nothing to fix it.

Even though Duplessis formally respected the separation of powers and left all relevant authorities intact, he would not only run the government but also be the de facto rulemaker in the Legislative Assembly. That was because the speaker would almost always rule in his favour, thus making parliamentary debates a mere formality. When Duplessis's ministers were asked questions by other members of the Assembly, Duplessis would often interrupt them to answer the questions himself, to correct them when he was displeased by what his subordinate was saying or to give other directions in their speech. One of the best-known descriptions of his grip over the ministers was an apocryphal anecdote popularized by Robert LaPalme, which suggested that Duplessis interrupted a press conference of Antoine Rivard, his minister of transportation and solicitor general, by shouting, "Toé, tais-toé!" (joual for "You, shut up!"). Leslie Roberts reported that a person who started questioning one of Duplessis's decisions met with his strongly worded rebuke announced in full cabinet meeting: "I took you out of the gutter. Keep your mouth shut, or I'll put you back where I found you!" A notable exception to this general trend was Paul Sauvé, Duplessis's informal heir apparent and short-lived successor, who was afforded a substantial degree of independence.

==== Electoral machine ====
The campaigns of the Union Nationale were based on five prongs: a great measure of personalization of the electoral communications, usage of marketing professionals (in this case, recruited from the party officials themselves), data-guided decisionmaking, usage of all media outlets available, and lavish spending. In pre-1948 elections, the main barrier for the Union Nationale was a shortage of campaign contributions to buy advertisements due to the Great Depression and World War II, but this all changed with the prosperity of the post-war years. The expenditures of the 1948 electoral campaign are estimated at $3 million (equivalent to $41.7 million in 2025 dollars) or more, and they rose further to $5 million in 1952 ($57.8 million in 2025) and to $9 million in 1956 ($103.3 million in 2025). (Note: If supplemental contracts for construction and services the government authorized are taken into account, the figure rises to a staggering $15 million, or $172.2 million in 2025. For comparison, election expenses of all parties and its candidates in the 2018 Quebec general election amounted to $23.12 million.) By the end of Duplessis's rule, the party's war chest ballooned to $18 million ($207 million in 2025). The Liberal Party's budget was no match to that of the Union Nationale (spending only a sixth of what Duplessis's party gave for each candidate in 1956), and the opposition still tended to use old-style campaign techniques.

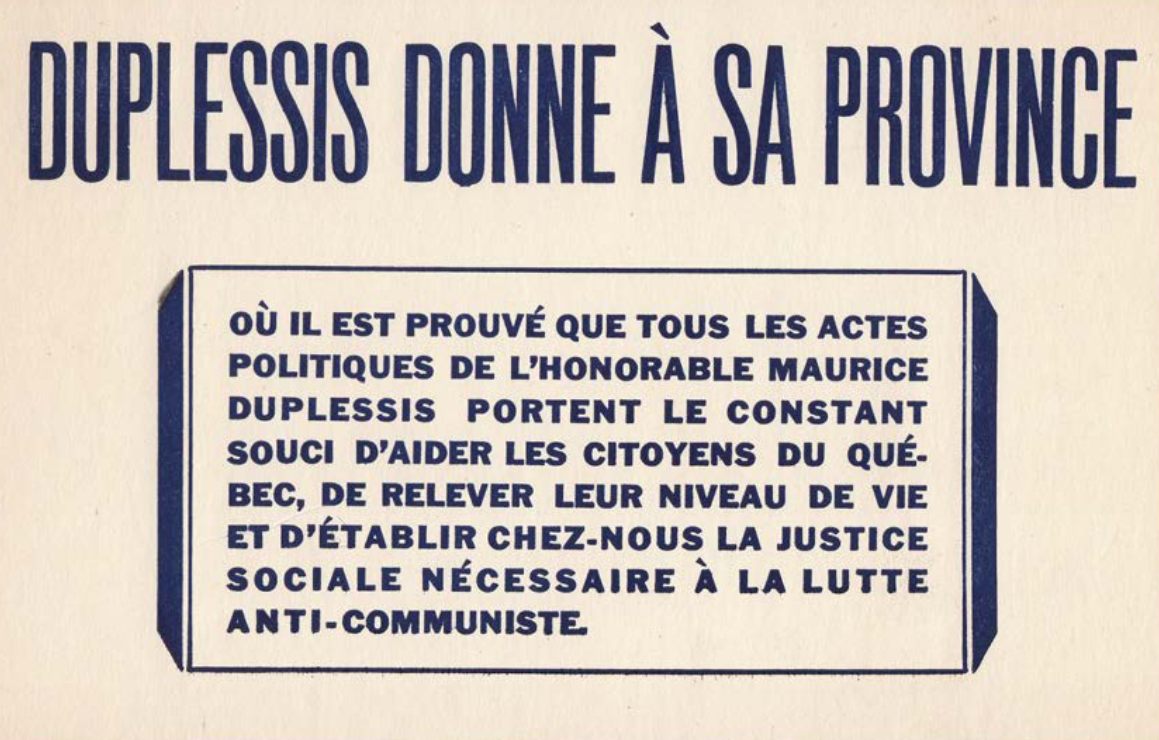
Part of a page of a propaganda booklet of the Union Nationale, 1948 (Note: The French text reads: "Duplessis gives to his province, where it was proven that all political deeds of the Honourable Maurice Duplessis show all the time the willingness to help the citizens of Quebec, to improve their standard of living and to establish [in our province] the social justice necessary to the fight against Communism")

To a large extent, the reason for that size of spending was the government's corruption. Historians agree that favouritism and clientelism were one of the defining features of Maurice Duplessis's reign over the province. Even though a system of paternalism did exist in Quebec politics for decades, Duplessis did not hesitate to amplify and abuse it for his own ends, his initial pledges to tackle corruption notwithstanding. (Note: The Anglophone business community, which was richer than the Francophone one, eagerly engaged in that system of patronage.) In 1944–48, tenders were not run at all, as in Duplessis's words, they were "hypocritical" since contracts were never awarded to enemies anyway. The companies which the premier handpicked as friendly enough could proceed with the transaction but only after the size of the kickbacks to the party's treasury was agreed. Duplessis's government would also use discretionary grants (or threaten their withdrawal) to pressure public institutions and organizations into support of the Union Nationale. It also helped that the high clergy was very supportive of Duplessis.

Duplessis did not seem to have gained personal financial benefits from the deals. That said, Duplessis did not particularly hide from the corruption. Pork barrel spending was a norm before elections, which was commonly realized via road construction. Duplessis would tell the constituents in the ridings that had not yet elected a representative of the Union Nationale that if they wanted some sort of investment in their area, they would have to show him this on election day. He notably stated during a 1952 political meeting in Verchères that its lack of subsidies was a punishment for electing a Liberal candidate.

==== Campaign innovations ====
Supplemental videos (in French)
- "Duplessis gives to his province", a short propaganda film by the Union Nationale 1948 (19')
- "Duplessis has remade the roads", a short propaganda film by the Union Nationale, c. 1950 (10').
- "Duplessis Ads, Finally Deciphered", a lecture by Alain Lavigne about the electoral marketing strategies of the team of Duplessis, 2021 (1h 6').
- "Duplessis is still alive... and so is his electoral strategy", Alain Lavigne replying to questions of his book publisher, Éditions du Septentrion, 2021 (31')

The ABC de l'Électeur, a booklet produced by the Union Nationale for the 1944 election

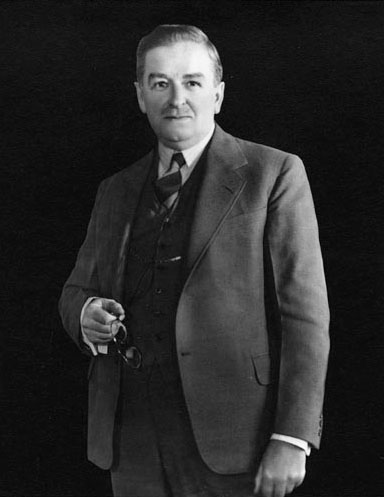
Duplessis in 1947. This photo and its derivatives were used in official electoral communications of the Union Nationale since 1948

The Union Nationale is recognized as a political force which brought numerous innovations to campaigning in Quebec. These in many ways were a preview of what would be used in the 1952 Republican presidential campaign in the United States, but which by that time were already used in the elections in California. This is primarily attributed to three people in Duplessis's proximity. Joseph Damase-Bégin, his minister of colonization and a former car dealer, was leading the efforts; Paul Bouchard was a journalist serving as director of propaganda and Duplessis's speechwriter; while Bruno Lafleur, the editor-in-chief of Duplessist Le Temps, was a general assistant in the campaign and analyzed the media environment.

One of the main features of the Union Nationale's campaign was a focus not on the party but on its leader. From 1939, election posters and the more and more plentiful merchandise increasingly featured Duplessis, who managed to outgrow the Union Nationale label. In electoral communications, voters were generally asked to endorse the premier rather than his party or its ideology. Duplessis's reputation reached something of a cult of personality within the province. Duplessis's image was very often presented with symbols such as the new flag of Quebec and mottos that, unlike in previous elections, were uniform across the province. A particularly known slogan was the one used in 1948 and 1952: Duplessis donne à sa province, (Note: English: Duplessis gives to his province) sometimes extended, if appropriate, with the accusation that les libéraux donnent aux étrangers. (Note: English: the Liberals give to the foreigners) The clergy of the time is often portrayed as having repurposed the century-old slogan le ciel est bleu, l'enfer est rouge (Note: French for "the sky is blue, the hell is red". Even though the logo of the Union Nationale contained both blue and red, the party was associated with the blue colour; the Liberals, on the other hand, were usually seen as "red") to agitate for Duplessis, but Alexandre Dumas writes that the revival of this adage should be attributed not to the priests but to Duplessis's campaign managers.

Initially, particularly in the first term, the press was at best unenthusiastic about Duplessis, and at worst outright hostile to him, because Liberal sympathizers owned most major outlets in Quebec. Therefore, Duplessis's team arranged for independent distribution of his own materials, notably Le catéchisme des électeurs. Over time, the Union Nationale made inroads into the media by establishing Le Temps in 1940 and by acquiring Montréal-Matin in 1947; it also tended to focus more on radio broadcasts. When the money appeared in late '40s, the Union Nationale would often buy full-page political ads in newspapers, and some of the Duplessis ads could even be found in The New York Times. Duplessis's party quickly adapted to the increasing adoption of television. Even in 1956, the Union Nationale did not use internal polling and instead the party fine-tuned their advertising based on the household television coverage by county.

There were additional advantages for Duplessis during that period. Georges-Émile Lapalme, the Liberal leader for most of the 1950s, did not have the political abilities of Duplessis. Duplessis also shaped the electoral system to his benefit. For example, he did not change the borders of ridings, and since there had been a large exodus of population from rural areas, this resulted in severe malapportionment in their favour, which benefited the Union Nationale. In fact, even though only a third of Quebec's electorate was in rural areas in 1950s, they elected two-thirds of the Legislative Assembly; also, the vast majority of Union Nationale's MLAs were elected outside Montreal and Quebec City. What's more, in 1953, Duplessis's party passed the law that effectively made the appointment of electoral officials dependent on the majority's will. The first-past-the-post system further enhanced Duplessis's electoral benefits. Even though the Union Nationale never got more than 52% of party votes, he consistently got a parliament that had at least three-fourths of its members from the Union Nationale.

==== Media and censorship ====
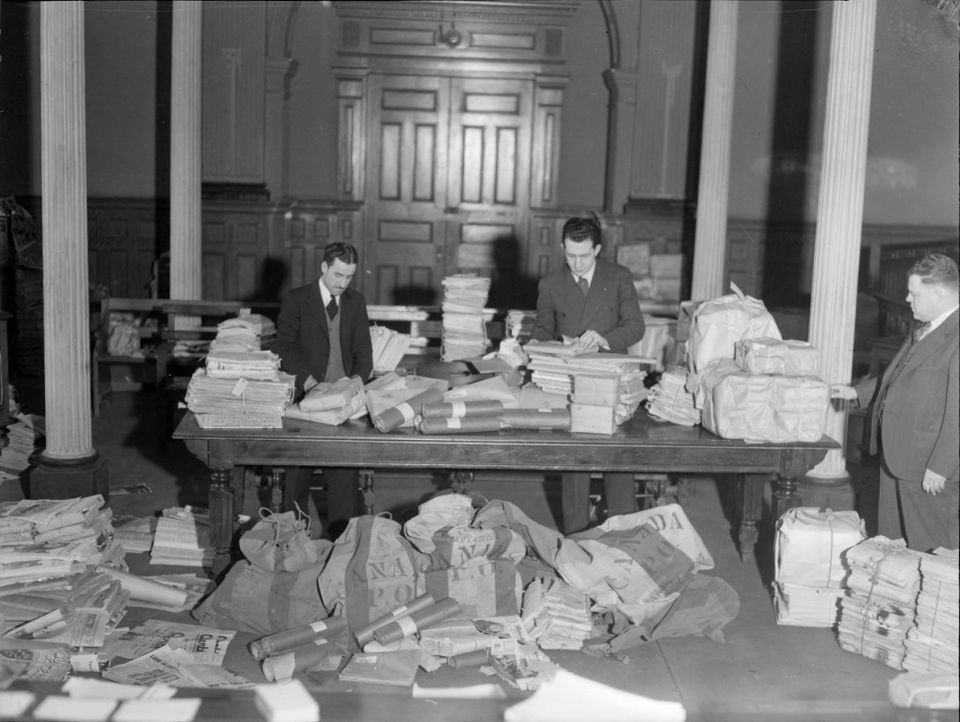
Three men in plain clothes inspect communist literature pursuant to the Padlock Law, 22 January 1938

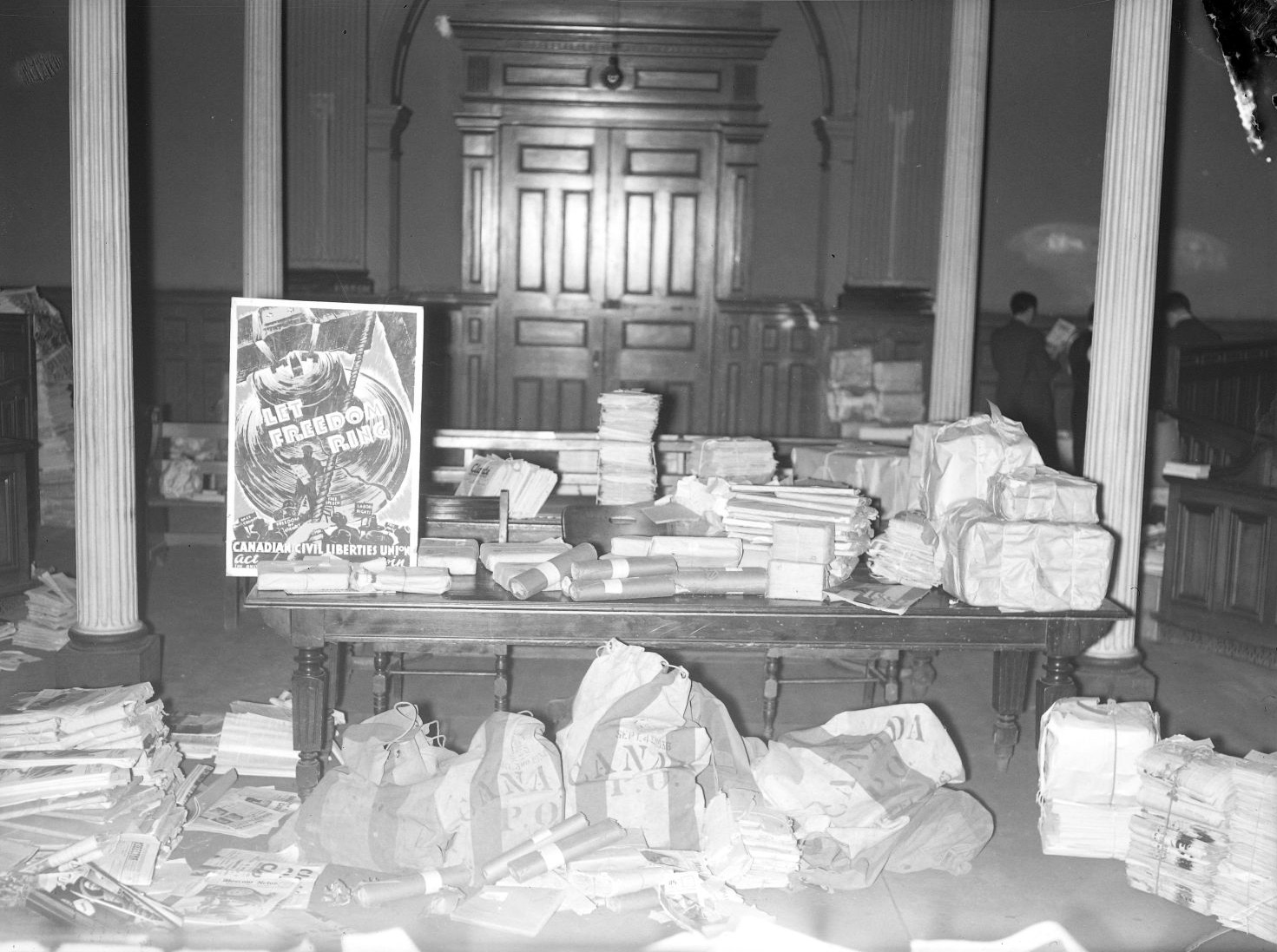
Confiscated items shown in the picture include La Clarté, La Revue de Moscou, Soviet Russia Today and a poster by the Canadian Civil Liberties Union

Duplessis maintained a tight grip over the press of Quebec, though his attitude towards press freedoms changed depending on the political circumstances. In the first term, Duplessis cracked down on communist papers such as La Clarté, which he could do thanks to the newly passed Padlock Law. But by the 1939 elections, Duplessis changed course and rallied against military censorship, promising to let the press publish whatever it wished, and ignored the censors' orders to submit texts for review. After the war, with the censorship lifted, the media landscape transformed from hostility to Duplessis to what Xavier Gélinas called "a sympathetic neutrality with respect to the government".

There were several reasons for this. Independently of Duplessis, media outlets shifted their main income source from party donations to advertisements, thus becoming less party-affiliated and dependent more on those who bought ad space. All major Quebec newspapers except Le Devoir accepted Union Nationale's ads, which were plentiful and often took full pages, if not several. The formerly Liberal press was additionally trying to modify the tone of coverage to attract supporters of the Union Nationale, so it eventually became supportive of the Duplessis administration. The premier notably established good ties with Jacob Nicol, a media tycoon, and attracted sympathy of such newspapers such as La Presse, La Patrie, Le Soleil, The Montreal Star, The Gazette as well as the CKAC radio station.

Duplessis's hostility towards opposition media also played a role. Among the most prominent critical outlets was Le Devoir, which turned against him following Duplessis's crackdown on strikers in asbestos mines in 1949; the premier unsuccessfully threatened to close it down as "Bolshevik" in 1954. Cité Libre, a low-volume but influential publication of intellectuals, was another focal point of anti-Duplessist thought. These were treated harshly. For example, when one journalist of Le Devoir uncovered the natural gas scandal in 1958, which involved kickbacks to the highest Union Nationale officials, Duplessis ordered the police to escort him out of the room and banned the newspaper from further government press conferences. Also, as had been already happening for decades, Duplessis silenced criticism of parliamentary activities by deploying his agents to the newspapers with complaints. They would often demand "corrections" to reports about what could be seen as Union Nationale's wrongdoings. Because a definitive record did not exist (Quebec's Hansard would not appear until 1962), the newspaper's account could be immediately discredited. The owner of the newspaper as well as those involved in the story could face repercussions. Therefore, most media outlets feared that its activities could be curtailed, including by government quotas on distribution of printing paper and the printing process itself for the outlets. Paradoxically, most of the press did not complain in public.

Literature was mostly unaffected by government intervention, in part because attacks on the government in fiction were not treated seriously in contemporary French Canadian society, but cinematic productions attracted significant scrutiny of the Attorney General's (Duplessis's) Bureau of Censorship. Yves Lever, a historian of cinematography, refers to the period as "the darkest in the censorship of cinema". Duplessis would often phone the censors to complain about the publications he did not like, which disproportionately affected contemporary French films (he found them "immoral"). Federally-owned media entities also had a hard time in Duplessis's Quebec. The distribution of the films of the National Film Board of Canada (NFB) was banned, as he thought that the organization was a communist stronghold, and he hindered the construction of a television transmitter meant for the NFB on Mount Royal. When a total ban became impossible, Duplessis persisted with a 1954 NFB film ban in schools, and he would then harass the Board with the imposition of censorship fees. Radio-Canada's broadcasting similarly suffered from accusations of "promoting federal centralism". Just like the NFB, the CBC was also censored in the province, ostensibly because it distracted children from doing homework and because of the apparent "immorality" of the films it showed. Duplessis additionally ordered censor reviews of all movies produced on 16 mm films, tried unsuccessfully to censor all TV broadcasting, and banned drive-in theatres.

As a response to these films, his government promoted home-grown documentary productions using the provincially-owned Service de ciné-photographie provincial (SCP). SCP then acted both as a censorship agency and as a filmmaker, albeit a relatively minor one. Maurice Proulx, a priest and agriculturer, produced a large portion of SCP films during Duplessis's rule, which contained Union Nationale-approved messages, though paradoxically Duplessis intervened less frequently into the SCP than his predecessor, Adélard Godbout.

==== Clashes over provincial autonomy ====
Supplemental video

Audio
- A speech by Maurice Duplessis, mocking his opponents and justifying his policies, CBC, 1956 (26m 33s), in English

Video
- A speech by Maurice Duplessis about provincial autonomy, Radio-Canada, 1954 (36s), in French
- A speech by Maurice Duplessis about the role of traditions in Quebec (41s), in French

While as a backbencher, Duplessis was not necessarily a strong advocate for provincial autonomy, that issue was among the most important of his premiership. Duplessis was a nationalist, but he opposed separatism as the concept was both unpopular and frightening to the contemporary society of Quebec. At the same time, he also railed against all manifestations of assimilation of French Canadians into surrounding English-speaking cultures–a prospect very few French Canadians liked as well. In this atmosphere, advocacy for autonomy appeared as a good middle-ground position. This idea was not new in political circles, but he was the one to have made it a centerpiece of his politics; as Jonathan Livernois writes, it was his "bread-and-butter issue". Duplessis affirmed in 1939 that "so long as [he] breathe[d], no one [would] touch the autonomy of the province of Quebec"; he was also known to say that no one "shall crucify the province of Quebec, even upon a cross of gold."

For the premier, the Constitution Act, 1867 was a treaty that could only be amended with the consent of all provinces and which envisioned a strictly federal structure of Canada. This meant that certain competencies must remain within the provinces, they may not be "rented out" to the federal government nor substituted by any sort of subsidy, and that the provinces should have freedom to impose their own taxes. Duplessis considered this as absolutely essential to preserve what he thought were the fundamental values of the French Canadian society – the Catholic faith, the French language and local traditions. Duplessis thus framed Quebec nationalism as a fight against bureaucratic centralist forces (particularly in Ottawa), but one which would hardly ever make clear what the politicians of the Union Nationale were fighting for, instead almost always showing what they were against.

However, since the Great Depression, the federal government was accumulating more powers. This was not popular in Quebec because it was seen as an attempt to assimilate French Canadians into surrounding English culture and customs. Premier Adélard Godbout nevertheless ceded the province's power to regulate unemployment benefits and agreed to suspend the levying of two taxes in favour of the federal government, with the understanding that Quebec would have their taxes back once World War II was over. However, after the war they remained with the federal government, and as all other provinces eventually agreed to rent out some of their powers to the federal government, Quebec was at most times the only province actively fighting the expansion of the federal activities. Duplessis, angry at the centralization of powers, once demanded Ottawa to "return our loot".

Duplessis's resistance to what he estimated was an encroachment on provincial powers was particularly visible in fiscal issues. In 1954, the Legislative Assembly passed a law creating a new provincial personal income tax (15% the size of the federal income tax), which Duplessis insisted should be deductible against the latter. Louis St. Laurent, then Prime Minister of Canada, opposed the idea and proposed subsidies instead, but he eventually caved in to Quebec's demands. Concessions included a 10% reduction of the Quebeckers' federal personal income tax bill to pave way for the provincial tax and leaving 9% of corporate tax and 50% of inheritance tax to the provinces. This achievement, according to Herbert Quinn, was of rather minor importance for the fiscal health of the province but was key in slowing down the federal government's advance on provincial autonomy.

Another area of contention was the federal subsidies to universities, which were adopted on recommendation of the Massey Report. Duplessis believed that education matters ought to be within the exclusive jurisdiction of the provinces and that direct financing of the universities from the federal government infringed on provinces' rights, so he banned Quebec universities from receiving the funds. The conflict was only resolved in autumn 1959, when Paul Sauvé, Duplessis's successor, joined the program. Another program Duplessis refused to join for the same reason (and which Quebec joined after his death) was the construction of the Trans-Canada Highway. On the other hand, Duplessis did not oppose federal government's initiatives in funding old-age pensions. He first joined a federal-provincial scheme in 1936 and then agreed to its full federal takeover in 1951. The condition he put in this case was that provinces should have the right to run their own pension systems (which currently is the case in Quebec).

To have a legal argument for his autonomist principles, Duplessis launched a parliamentary committee, called the Tremblay Commission, in 1953. Thomas Tremblay was a close friend of Duplessis's, who, among other things, advised him to introduce the provincial personal income tax. However, even though the 1956 report endorsed Duplessis's autonomist views and even argued that direct taxes should only be levied by the provinces, it was not well received by the person who ordered it. Duplessis found its content to be too philosophical, when what he was expecting was a simple answer to a practical need. Having done everything he wanted before the report's publication, Duplessis did not want to be bound by its other recommendations, nor by the pressure of outside advocacy groups. In particular, the premier resented the proposals about what the relations with municipalities and school districts should look like. The distribution of the Tremblay Report was suppressed for several months prior to the 1956 election, which, ironically, he won by rallying the population around the motto of provincial autonomy.

There has been some criticism of his autonomism from various groups. The Anglophones and federalists disliked Duplessis's too frequent confrontations with Ottawa. Critics questioned the logic of fighting tooth and nail for provincial autonomy all while being favourable to foreign capital investments. For George-Émile Lapalme, leader of the Liberals during most of the 1950s, Duplessis "has really invented provincial autonomy even if it had been invoked before him [...] Electoral autonomy, negative autonomy, verbal autonomy, ludicrous autonomy, autonomy of filling, autonomy of emptiness. [...] Was there anyone who made it more attractive than him?" From the conservative side, Lionel Groulx, an influential nationalist priest, criticised his fight for provincial autonomy as "pseudonationalist". Duplessis's assertion of provincial autonomy did not find much support in the Supreme Court of Canada's jurisprudence of the time, which struck down some of the laws targeting minorities and dissenters as it argued that the laws infringed on the federal government's exclusive powers. Duplessis then complained that "the Supreme Court [was] like the Tower of Pisa – it always leans on one side [that of the federal government]."

==== Flag of Quebec ====
The Union Flag serves as the de facto official flag of Quebec, pre-1948

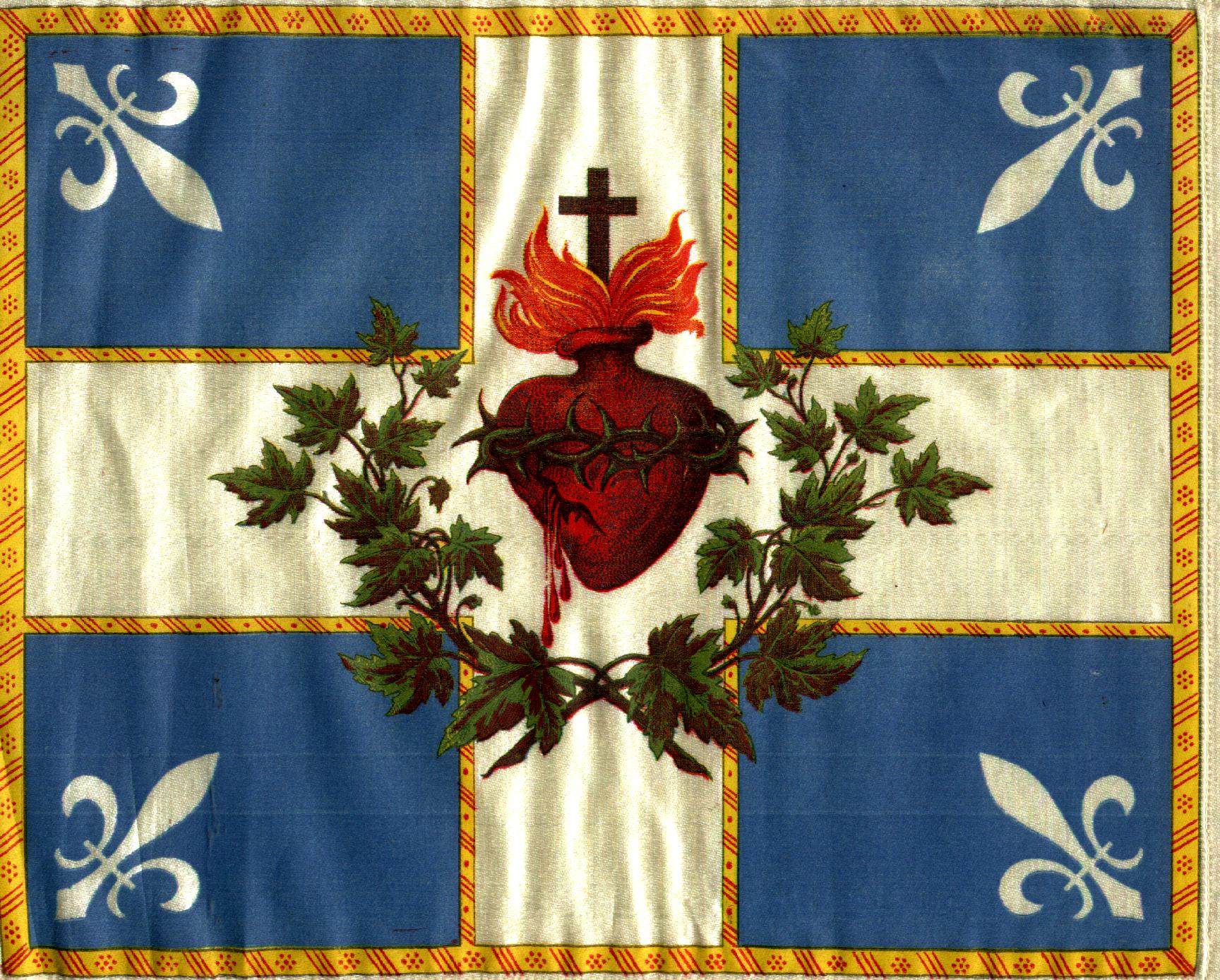
A Carillon banner with the Sacred Heart (Carillon-Sacré-Cœur flag), precursor of the current flag

Flag of Quebec (Carillon) as flown on 21 January – 2 February 1948

Flag of Quebec as flown in the times of Duplessis. The flag has changed little since then

Supplemental videos (in French)
- Archive videos about the history of the flag of Quebec, Radio-Canada

Both Canada and Quebec had their own flags with the Union Jack, but neither was distinctive from other flags used in the Commonwealth, and the Quebec Blue Ensign was rarely used. Instead, until World War II, the French Canadians would often use the flag of France as a display of their distinctiveness (which, after a slight modification, stuck with the Acadians). At the same time, in the early 1900s, there was some heavy promotion of the Carillon-Sacré-Cœur flag, which proved a success among the people of the province.

René Chaloult, an independent MLA, was particularly angered by lack of changes to the Canadian Red Ensign that were proposed in mid-1940s. In his motion, he criticized it as a flag with colonial connotations and proposed to adopt a distinctive provincial flag. Duplessis initially hesitated, which André Laurendeau attributed to his fear that he would be seen as separatist. However, the premier then had some secret conversations with Lionel Groulx, who recognized that Duplessis wanted to be credited for its adoption. Groulx proposed that no coat of arms should appear, and that the fleur-de-lis that formerly pointed to the centre of the flag should be kept up straight. On 21 January 1948, when the Legislative Assembly was supposed to vote on Chaloult's motion, Duplessis's government used the opportunity to adopt the modified flag by an Order in Council. The Carillon flag flew for two weeks over the assembly until it was replaced by the version now known as the "Duplessis version". The premier used the occasion to rally the population over the popular new design in the 1948 election, which Duplessis won by a landslide, capturing 82 out of 92 seats.

==== The Catholic Church and religious minorities ====
Before 1960, English-language media would commonly refer to Quebec in a pejorative way as the "priest-ridden province", even though the government itself was always secular. Quebec of the time was overwhelmingly Catholic and the Church was omnipresent in the daily life of French Canadians in the province, with education, social services and healthcare still mostly managed by Catholic organisations. This allowed Duplessis to have low-paid nuns do the jobs of teachers and nurses, and as a result, minimize budgetary expenditures and keep taxes low.

The reasons why Duplessis was close to the Catholic Church officials and the degree of closeness are disputed. Robert Rumilly, Conrad Black and Bernard Saint-Aubin, the main biographers of Duplessis, as well as Richard Jones and Yves Vaillancourt all maintain that, with the possible exception of Archbishop Joseph Charbonneau of Montreal (1940–50), the clergy was in such friendly relations with Duplessis that the premier was rumoured to say that "the clergy eats out of my hand". (Note: As for Archbishop Joseph Charbonneau, Conrad Black suggests that his departure, officially for the reasons of "ill health", was in fact engineered by Duplessis in particular because Charbonneau supported the trade unions during the Asbestos strike, which Duplessis cracked down on, and because his views were not supported by the majority of the clergy, which was generally strongly conservative.) Different authors provide various explanations for this: for Rumilly, it was the approval of Duplessis's defence of French-Canadian traditions and conservative values, while Black and Dion suggest that Duplessis led to the fall of importance of the Church by subjecting it to his dependence, but the Church still remained loyal to the premier and was generally ideologically aligned with Duplessis. Jones adds that Duplessis and the Catholic Church needed each other: the Church wanted more funds to operate and expand, which made it dependent on the government, but at the same time it saved much money for Duplessis with its low-paid nuns.

Alexandre Dumas, a historian of early 20th-century Quebec, presents a different outlook. His book on the Catholic Church agrees with Conrad Black that the Church's role was shrinking in Duplessis's years, but argues that it had been a general trend since 1935. Duplessis's attitude towards Church officials was in fact paternalistic, and the most he offered to the Church were numerous symbolic gestures. Duplessis mainly used religion for electoral benefit: on the one hand, he would often hint that his ideas were supported by his religious convictions or the clergy itself (even if not always true), while on the other, he would use the church officials' still numerous endorsements to rally support for his ideas. However, the rank-and-file clergy was not a monolith and its demands were not always satisfied. Many clergymen, unlike Duplessis, supported Asbestos strike participants in 1949. In 1956, two priests criticized Duplessis's electoral practices in a Catholic Church publication, Ad usum sacerdotum, and in 1960, just after Duplessis's death, Brother Jean-Paul Desbiens wrote Les insolences du Frère Untel, a scathing critique of the contemporary state of Quebec.

The cordial relations with the Church did not extend to other religions. The Canadian Jewish Congress, though a minor voice in Quebec, was largely dissatisfied by the Duplessis's regime; however, the government's main targets were the Jehovah's Witnesses. William Kaplan described the premier's efforts "the most extensive campaign of state-sponsored religious persecution ever undertaken in Canada". Quebeckers objected to Witnesses' proselytizing efforts, which in pre-war times were often done by very controversial means, including by portraying Catholic priests as fat pigs and the Pope as a prostitute. Duplessis saw them as a threat to the Catholic Church, and went so far as to declare in 1946 "a merciless war" against the sect. When charges of blasphemous libel for the Witnesses' literature fell apart, municipalities started to enact bylaws prohibiting distribution of literature on the streets or requiring a license to do so, which contributed to several arrests of the members of the sect. Frank Roncarelli, a restaurant owner in Montreal, was known for posting bail for them. This drew the ire of Duplessis, who said that "the communists, Nazis as well as those who are the propagandists for the Witnesses of Jehovah, [had] been treated and w[ould] continue to be treated by the Union Nationale government as they deserve for trying to infiltrate themselves and their seditious ideas in the Province of Quebec". Duplessis had Roncarelli's liquor licence revoked in retaliation, and the business went bankrupt.

The court cases involving the legal harassment of Jehovah's Witnesses in Quebec resulted in a series of landmark Supreme Court of Canada cases in the domain of freedom of speech (R. v Boucher, Saumur v Quebec (City of), Lamb v Benoit) and administrative law (Roncarelli v Duplessis), which were all decided in the Witnesses' favour. In Roncarelli, Duplessis was fined over $30,000 (about $417000 in 2025 dollars) for his abuse of power.

==== Relations with the Anglophone minority ====
Under Duplessis, the Anglophones of Quebec retained their privileged and autonomous position within the province. Duplessis strictly respected the local arrangements that English speakers in the province had with respect to education, healthcare and municipal affairs. This, he hoped, would make him look good in front of English-speaking businessmen and potential investors in the province; Conrad Black also argued that Duplessis's genuine dislike of discrimination against minorities played a role. However, at the time, French Canadians were de facto discriminated against by Anglophone Quebeckers in the economic sphere: lower-class Anglophones were receiving higher wages for the same work compared to the majority French-speaking population, while upper-class Anglophones dominated the business world and almost all middle-to-high income jobs. In 1961, even though 30% of the population of Canada was French Canadian, it controlled less than 10% of Canadian companies.

Despite such favourable treatment, support of the Union Nationale among the English-speaking Quebeckers was limited to newspapers and to business interests. The press switched from being constantly critical of the Quebec government to a conciliatory attitude towards Duplessis. The business interests appreciated his anti-Communism, fiscal conservatism, opposition to the welfare state, the fight against the trade unions and his opposition to federal centralization. In rural areas, support among the English-speaking population was also fairly strong but that was more related to an alignment with the interests of rural French Canadians. However, the Anglophones living on the West Island of Montreal were deeply dissatisfied with the Union Nationale, not only because of its French Canadian nationalism, but also due to its perceived backwardness and resistance to progress. The Anglophone community of Montreal therefore remained one of the few strongholds of the provincial Liberal Party in the 1950s.

=== Economy ===
==== General description ====
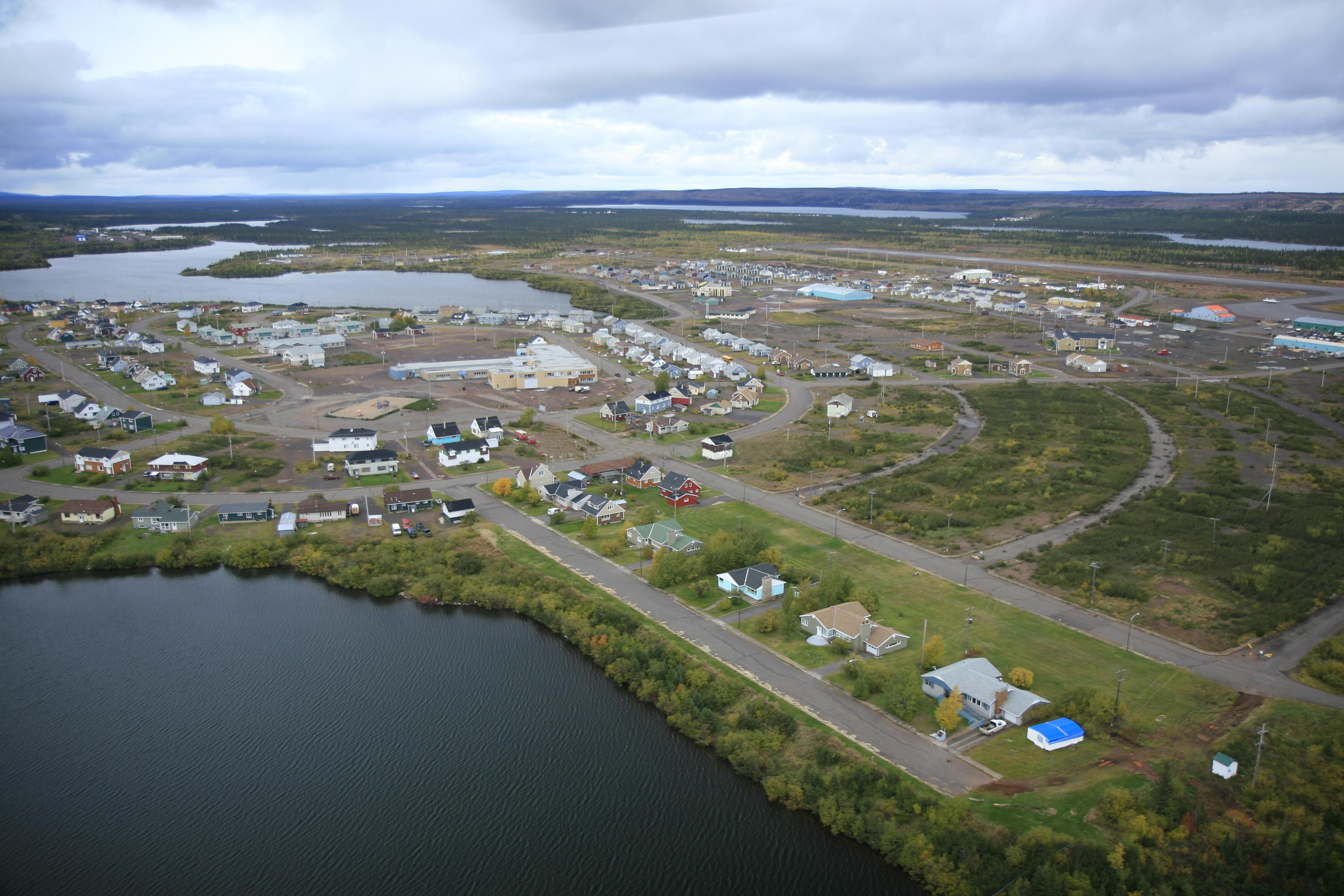
The town of Schefferville, hundreds of kilometres away from major population centres, was built during Duplessis's tenure thanks to the extraction of iron ore

Unlike in the first years of the Duplessis's premiership, post-war Quebec was operating in a very favourable economic environment caused by the post-war economic expansion. In a large degree, the growth was caused by a boom in natural resources extraction and in the manufacturing sector, which were further enhanced by increases in productivity and efficiency. Maurice Duplessis was economically a supporter of classical liberalism, particularly of laissez-faire economics. For Duplessis, private investment was generally the only way forward for the province, which he argued was the case as "the government [couldn't] do everything because the moment it [did], liberty [would] disappear". If there was any role for the provincial government, it was rather to provide infrastructure necessary for the growth of businesses and the regulatory framework to keep the cost of business low.

There is considerable dispute about whether Quebec grew stronger than its neighbours during this time. Vincent Geloso argues that the post-war era was the age of "The Great Catch-Up" and is attributable to Duplessis's policies. He cites higher growth than in the United States and a relative increase of Quebeckers' incomes compared to Ontario, British Columbia, Canada in general, or the United States. Reviewers of the book were more skeptical of the claims. Pierre Fortin pointed to the fact that most of the income growth happened immediately after the war and opined that the rest may be attributed to lower population growth, which explains the relatively faster per capita growth of Quebec's incomes. Emery Herb stated that similar phenomenons were occurring in Alberta, Saskatchewan and New Brunswick, which had governments with different ideological and economical attitudes from Duplessis's, and suggested that the favourable concentration of wartime industries in Quebec was the reason behind the apparent faster growth. Michel Sarra-Bournet suggested that the growth in 1947–1957 was slower than the Canadian average and lagged behind Ontario's, which could be attributed to the shifting patterns of industrialization that left Quebec on the periphery of economic activity, then centered on the Great Lakes. Richard Jones wrote that the Ontario-Quebec gap persisted, but without specifying its dynamics during Duplessis's term.

Regardless of this debate, the overall performance of Quebec's economy was generally strong. Average real GDP growth of Quebec was positive throughout Duplessis's post-war terms. Recessions in Quebec were shorter than elsewhere and mostly caused by external factors. A substantial part of the growth during Duplessis's era came from foreign investments in the Quebec economy, propelled by the demand for natural resources that were abundant in the province. Jean-Luc Migué estimates that industrial growth from 1935 to 1955 was faster than either Canada's or Ontario's and was just above 10% per annum. Quebec's economy enjoyed almost full employment for a decade, having total unemployment rates of around 3% - only slightly higher than in Canada or Ontario - and any appreciable structural unemployment only started to appear after 1955. While the situation became gradually worse by the end of 1950s as the economy slowed, with 9% unemployment by 1960, the real growth trend province-wide remained positive. Wages and salaries were increasing slightly faster than in the rest of Canada.

In the long term, the government's revenues were almost equal to its expenditures and more years saw surpluses than deficits. Duplessis, who was likely traumatized by his tumultuous first term as premier, hated borrowing on the public account and generally resisted any programs that meant increased expenditures. This resulted in debt service costs falling on a per capita basis to the lowest level in Canada. This penchant for fiscal conservatism notwithstanding, expenditures increased dramatically: the budget of 1959 was three times larger in real terms than that of 1944.

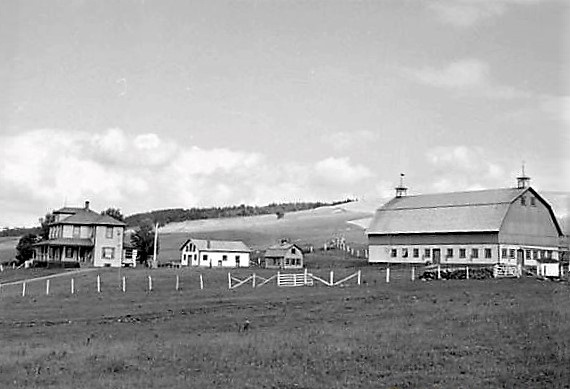
A farm in the Saint-Léon-le-Grand in the Matapedia Valley in eastern Quebec. Despite Duplessis's rhetoric about the rural destiny of Quebec, areas like these saw a substantial part of their population migrate to the Greater Montreal area

Development remained regionally unequal. Most of the investment, as well as population and financial growth, came to the financial capital of Canada of the time, Montreal, which enjoyed a fairly high standard of life, comparable to Ontario. On the other hand, the rest of Quebec was lagging far behind and, in terms of prosperity, was about equal to the much poorer Maritimes. Duplessis's years saw a rural exodus towards larger cities, particularly to Montreal, where suburbanization had begun. The premier's ideological commitment to the countryside, however, meant that he still enacted policies favourable for these areas, such as government-sponsored programs to install drainage and sewage facilities, the province-wide prohibition on margarine to protect dairy interests, and more cheap rural loans. These farmers could also reap benefits from electrification provided by the Office of Rural Electrification, a Quebec government organization, as well as new machinery to increase productivity.

==== Industry and infrastructure ====
Duplessis welcomed any investments that came into Quebec, including from American or Anglo-Canadian entrepreneurs, and made few state-based investments in the mining, logging, or manufacturing industry. The premier actively lobbied Americans to spend their money in the province and regularly held personal negotiations with representatives of big American companies. The government pursued an approach of low taxation and generally imposed few conditions on the functioning of the natural resources sector, which was among the fastest-growing in the province. The fact that Duplessis's enforcement of labour laws was to the greatest extent accommodating for the employers, or not enforced if that was to mean benefits for the trade unions, also helped gain favour in these circles.

Among the important new production capacities built during Duplessis's tenure were the paper plants of the Canadian International Paper Company in Gatineau, another paper facility in Baie-Comeau (now owned by Resolute Forest Products) and Johns Manville's asbestos mines. However, the largest new natural resources project was related to iron ore deposits in central Labrador Peninsula. As much as 3,900 mi^{2} (10,000 km^{2}) of territory was granted for exploration to Hollinger North Shore Exploration Co. That company leased the rights to the Iron Ore Company of Canada, which developed the resources, promoted the construction of the city of Schefferville around the mines and built a railway specifically to transport the ore to the shore, at Sept-Îles. The terms of the lease attracted much controversy, with the opposition decrying them as selling the ore "for a cent per tonne" (un sou la tonne), though scholars are unable to agree if this slogan is factually correct. The Liberals further despised the fact that the profits went to American and English-Canadian shareholders, rather than to French Canadians. While proposals were made to create smelting factories on the Côte-Nord, there was no political will to do that in Duplessis's times, and it is unclear whether Duplessis could actually succeed in ordering local ore processing.

The only major state investments under Duplessis related to industry were into infrastructure. Hydro-Québec developed rapidly by putting the Bersimis-1 and Bersimis-2 hydroelectric generators into service and by starting the construction on the main dam on the Manicouagan River in 1959. Road infrastructure was also rapidly developed, though this normally happened within the clientelist frameworks set by the Union Nationale. Most investments were concentrated in rural areas, where the party's strongholds were located, but the congestion problems of Montreal were ignored and the development of high-capacity motorways (autoroutes) was lagging. The first one, the A-15, was only opened in 1959.

==== Labour relations ====
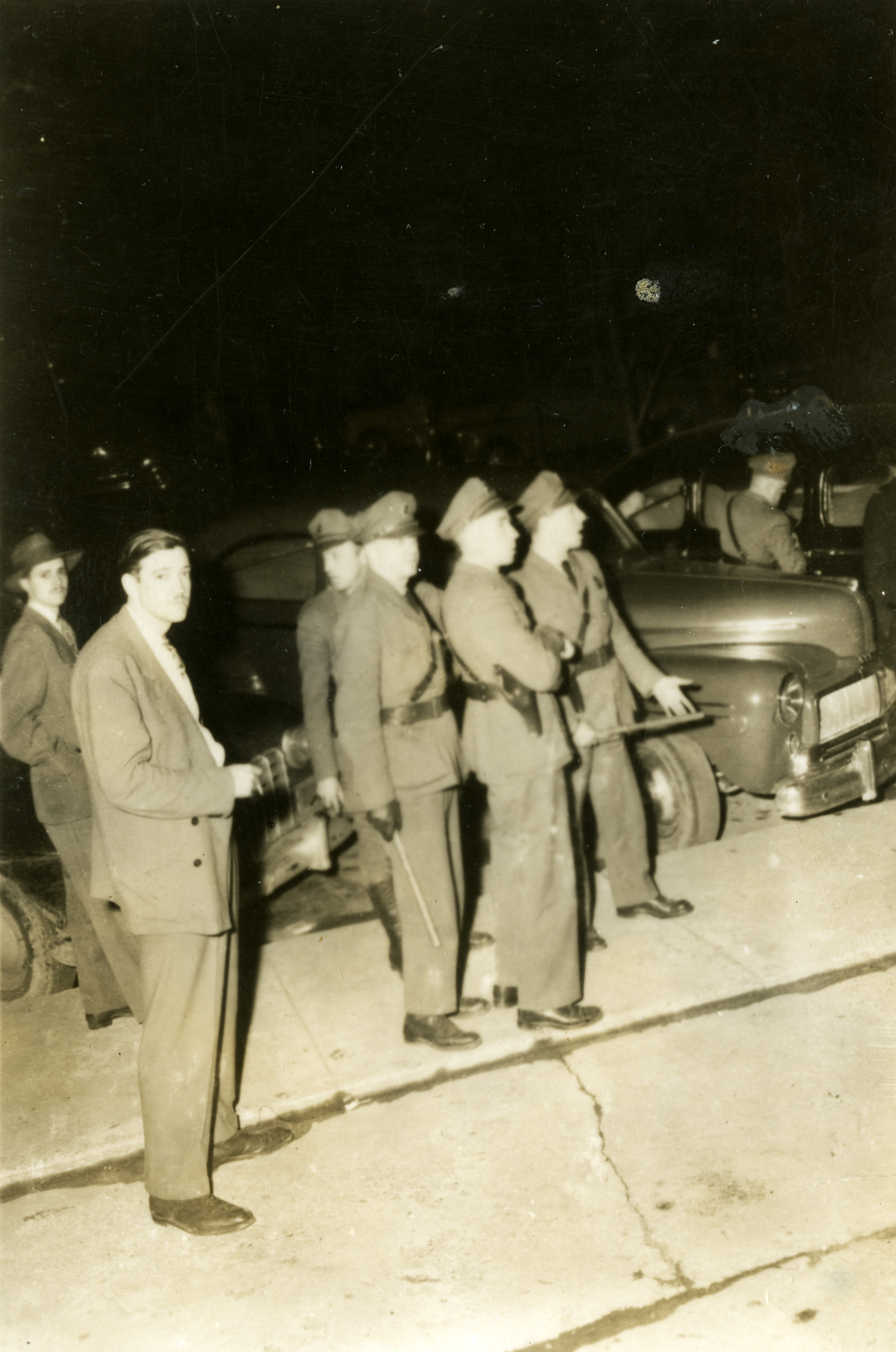
The police prepare to intervene during the Asbestos strike, 1949. Duplessis would often personally order police interventions into strikes to break them.

While Duplessis was courting big corporations to invest in Quebec, his attitude towards trade unions was far from amicable. Conrad Black writes that Duplessis supported the working class so long as it was not unionized–for Duplessis, unions were unnecessary as labour was already in plentiful supply but capital to develop industries was not. Jacques Rouillard adds that Duplessis did not oppose unionization per se, but due to his strong attachment to law and order, he resented any confrontations between workers and their employers. His government was the only one at the time in Canada to be actively suppressing trade unions.

Some worker protections were passed in the first term. For example, the practice where the employers fired employees only to return them to work with a lower salary was banned. The policy, however, was ineffective, as companies increasingly stopped negotiating with the workers and were bypassing the trade unions while asking for government's intervention during strikes. This was the case with the Dominion Textile strike in August 1937 and another one in a shipyard in Sorel. Duplessis described the latter dispute as "unfortunate and unjustified" and ordered employees to return to work before starting negotiations. Trade unions were disadvantaged: closed shop and union shop arrangements were banned, the government sued unions that it did not recognize and, perhaps most importantly, a law was passed that granted the government the right to unilaterally amend any collective bargaining agreements already in force.

The anti-union activities further continued during his second term. The Padlock Law, enacted in 1937, was now increasingly used against trade union activists rather than the original target of suspected communists. Also, since 1949, the Worker Relations Commission (CRO) was instructed to deny recognition to any trade union that allowed communists or their sympathisers as members. The CRO itself had a consistent pro-business bias under Duplessis and was actively using its powers to deny recognition to new trade unions and rescind certification to existing organizations, often without justification and as a punishment for the union's excessive activism. Duplessis also banned unionization and collective bargaining for public sector employees, sabotaged efforts to pass amendments that could prevent employer abuse of the labour laws and allowed municipalities to effectively prohibit soliciting for strike action.

When strikes did occur, the provincial police would often help employers by escorting strikebreakers to the workplace, forcing their way through strikers' blockades and intimidating the strikers by their massive presence. Among the most important strikes of the era was the widely publicised Asbestos strike, which Duplessis, as Attorney General, ordered the protesters to be forcibly and violently dispersed. Even though the strike largely ended in failure for the unions, it is ingrained in the collective memory of Quebeckers as "the finest hour for the organized labour movement", or even as a victory for it, in a large degree thanks to a 1956 publication edited by Pierre Trudeau, future prime minister of Canada. This work depicts the conflict as a struggle between an autocratic and repressive government with a pro-business bias on one side, and workers demanding basic rights on the other. The Asbestos strike is often considered a turning point in the history of Quebec.

==== Social services ====
Duplessis decried the federal government's efforts to expand the welfare state as a violation of provincial autonomy and as an offensive of "Anglo-Saxon and Protestant 'socialism'". In particular, Duplessis often asserted that the programs were unconstitutional and argued that the money that Ottawa spent on these services came from taxes that should have been levied by the provinces in the first place, and therefore should not have been managed by the federal government. This, for instance, was the case with the family allowances. However, the premier generally did not want to introduce these programs himself, as he considered the welfare state a form of paternalism that must be avoided, and stressed that the government "cannot replace charity and philanthropy". Duplessis thus opposed a comprehensive health insurance scheme, rebuffed expansion of the old age pension system requested by a trade union by stating that "the best system is still the one that least relies on the state", (Note: In original French: "Le meilleur système est encore celui qui depend le moins de l’État" (January 1951)) and called for private actors to provide services which the government could not or did not want to. In fact, in 1959, according to calculations made by Yves Vaillancourt, only 21.3% of funds allocated to social services originated from the provincial government, while the rest came from Ottawa. Unlike federal programs, most of the provincial programs were long-standing (the newest was adopted in 1938) and did not change despite their shortcomings.

The government itself did not appear to have a coherent social policy, and any intervention it pursued was situational, discretionary and even arbitrary, rather than systematic. Due to the limited capacity of charity, the sick, the unemployed and the poor were often left without any assistance. As had been done previously, most services were provided by the Catholic Church (both contracted by the government and on charity); there were few professional social service workers employed by the government.

===== Education and culture =====
Supplemental video (in French)
- A speech by Maurice Duplessis about education, Radio-Canada, 1959 (53s)

It cannot be said that Duplessis did not act at all in the social sphere, and this is most evident within the educational domain. However, for ideological reasons, the role of the state was intentionally limited. The government was only there to aid the educational process rather than to implement it. The role of the parent in education was considered the most important of all, while the actual in-school teaching was performed by the Catholic Church using state funds. Cultural development was treated as an extension of education and, in policy considerations, they were considered inseparable from each other. Therefore, it was often a subject of disputes between Duplessis and the federal government as education policy remained a provincial matter.

The government created the Ministry of Social Welfare and Youth in 1946, in part to prepare the growing baby-boom generation for the industrial needs of post-war Quebec and in part as an assertion of provincial autonomy, though the Provincial Secretariat retained control over most of the educational functions. Expenditures for schools and the youth skyrocketed from $21.4 million in the 1946–47 budget to over $200 million in the budget of 1959–60. The funding prioritized professional education in technical subjects and scholarships to foreign universities, though substantial funds were also poured into art schools, conservatories and in support of crafts. More than 4,000 schools were built under his tenure, mostly those that substituted the one-room schools with more modern buildings, or those in the countryside. Enrolment increased and in 1956 the school curriculum was reformed to create public secondary schools.

Still, serious problems remained within education throughout Duplessis's tenure. Teachers' salaries still were very low. The system was complex, disorganized, often unsuited to the challenges of the post-war era and struggling to cope with the ever-increasing stream of baby boomers. School districts, which were reliant on property taxes for funding, were often underfunded and in deep debt. Crucially, despite the fact that the laws of the time mandated primary school participation, they were weakly enforced by the Duplessis government. In 1958, 37% of French Canadian students who began primary school never finished it and only 13% finished full secondary education (as opposed to 36% of Protestant, or Anglophone, population). The problem of inadequate school enrolment was a long-term one, but despite Duplessis's attempts to resolve it with increased funding, the issue only disappeared with the reforms of the 1960s. Efforts to support the French language or to reach out to other Francophone cultures were rather insignificant. Low-quality French was so commonly spoken at the time that it became subject of a 1959 editorial by André Laurendeau, which popularized the term "joual", as well as one of the themes of Les Insolences du Frère Untel.

Access to education was also different depending on language and was much easier in English than in French. While the Anglophone population (under the Protestant school commission) was generally able to attend university straight after 11 years of public schooling, for the majority Francophone population, the only way to get to a university was through a classical college, which provided only general education in the humanities and neglected technical sciences. Colleges were not free and were not available to women. Those who managed to finish secondary education generally could choose out of five universities in Quebec (six after the opening of the University of Sherbrooke in 1954), three of which were Anglophone, resulting in the graduates being disproportionately English-speaking. The French-language universities in Duplessis's times were intended to carry out the policy of preserving the Catholic French Canadian culture, which was one of the reasons why Duplessis refused federal university subsidies, while at the same time making higher education closely connected to the needs of businesses. Hence the new higher education facilities were the Mining School, the Faculty of Geodesy and Forestry at the Université Laval, and the Faculty of Sciences in Sherbrooke. Funding for universities remained low, which caused a student strike in 1958.

===== Healthcare =====
Healthcare, just like education, was generally not considered to be a major area of government intervention. The onus to provide healthcare was often on charity and philanthropy, and emphasis was made on the individual to resolve their health issues. There was no government interest in providing universal healthcare coverage. The plans to do so that appeared during the term of Adélard Godbout as a result of the Provincial commission of inquiry into hospitals (the Lessard Commission), but were scrapped once Duplessis became premier for the second time. Thus, in 1949, 67.8% of total healthcare costs was financed by the patients themselves paying out-of-pocket or for private medical insurance packages. Duplessis's government refused to join the joint federal-provincial healthcare insurance plan established by the Hospital Insurance and Diagnostic Services Act of 1957 on provincial autonomy grounds. Quebec only joined it four years later.

The government achieved much progress in treating tuberculosis by deploying mobile units to far-flung places, whose employees provided basic hygiene advice to the general population and treated newborn children. The units proved very efficient, but they remained underfunded. Another achievement was the reduction of the difference between the life expectancy of Quebeckers and Canadians: while in 1944, men and women in Quebec were expected to live 2.7 and 3.2 fewer years than the Canadian average, respectively, this decreased to 1.2 and 1.5 years in 1959. Most of the reduction happened immediately after World War II. That said, by the end of Duplessis's rule, the healthcare system remained ineffective and chaotic, and it lagged behind the other provinces.

The Duplessis years saw a rapid increase of healthcare funding: in 1948–1956, the average rate of healthcare expenditure increases was 23.3% per year. A portion of the new funds was invested in building new or enlarging existing hospitals. Quebec experienced a dire shortage of hospital beds due to the fact that previous governments neglected investments in this domain, but these massive construction projects only modestly increased hospital bed availability as the province's population was booming. In 1954, the availability still remained the worst among all provinces. Most of the money went to finance an ever-increasing burden set by the Public Charities Act of 1921 (Loi de l'assistance publique), which allowed people considered indigent to receive limited free healthcare. (Note: While the Public Charities Act also provided for the provision of social services, in practice it was usually applied as a law financing healthcare, and the "indigent" people were ill people for the purposes of that law. The problem was also the definition of who was indigent, which often forced the poor to go through laborious and humiliating inquiries before getting the certificate required to receive free healthcare.) The subsidies proved insufficient as hospitals could not keep up with the escalating expenses since charity funding, which contributed to 13.3% of the total healthcare expenditure, was drying up. Healthcare workers were overburdened and worked on low salaries.

Primarily under the second premiership of Duplessis, multiple hospitals run by the Catholic Church deliberately misdiagnosed several thousand otherwise healthy orphaned or abandoned children with mental illnesses to get increased federal subsidies for the construction and maintenance of mental asylums, which were much more generous than assistance provided for orphanages. Duplessis personally urged the high clergy, and passed statutes to that effect, to change the classification of orphanages to mental asylums so as to reduce the financial burden on the provincial government. Children under custody of the church officials were often abused, beaten and medicated even though that treatment was not justified by their needs.
