= Charles Laplante dit Champagne =

Charles Laplante dit Champagne may refer to:

- Charles Champagne (Deux-Montagnes MLA) (1838–1907), member of the Legislative Assembly of Quebec for Deux-Montagnes electoral district, and later a member of the Legislative Council of Quebec
- Charles Champagne (Hochelaga MLA) (1849–1925), member of the Legislative Assembly of Quebec for Hochelaga electoral district
