= Royal Commission on the Constitution =

Royal Commission on the Constitution can refer to:

- Royal Commission on the Constitution (Australia), 1927-1929
- Royal Commission on the Constitution (United Kingdom), 1969-1973, also known as the Crowther Commission, Kilbrandon Commission or Kilbrandon Report

== See also ==
- Royal Commission of Inquiry on Constitutional Problems, Canada, 1953-1956
