= Jérémie-Louis Décarie =

Canadian politician and judge (1870–1927)

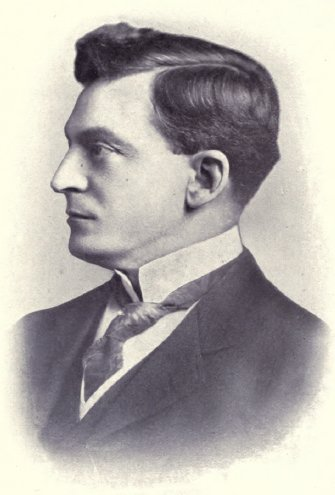

Member of the Legislative Assembly of Quebec for Hochelaga
- In office 1904–1912
- Preceded by: Daniel-Jérémie Décarie
- Succeeded by: District abolished

Member of the Legislative Assembly of Quebec for Maisonneuve
- In office 1912–1919
- Preceded by: District created
- Succeeded by: Adélard Laurendeau

Personal details
- Born: August 30, 1870 Notre-Dame-de-Grâce, Quebec
- Died: November 5, 1927 (aged 57) Montreal, Quebec
- Resting place: Notre Dame des Neiges Cemetery
- Relations: Daniel-Jérémie Décarie, father

Jérémie-Louis Décarie, KC (French pronunciation: [ʒeʁemi lwi dekaʁi]; August 30, 1870 – November 5, 1927) was a Canadian lawyer, politician, and judge in the province of Quebec.

Born in Notre-Dame-de-Grâce, Quebec, the son of Daniel-Jérémie Décarie and Philomène Leduc, Décarie was educated at Sainte-Marie College and at the Université Laval in Montreal. He was called to the Bar of Quebec in 1896 and was created a King's Counsel in 1904. He read law, first in the office of E. Barnard and later with Mercier, Gouin & Lemieux. He later became a partner in the firm of Gouin, Lemieux & Decarie. In 1903 he formed a partnership with A. Decary under the firm name of Decarie & Decary.

He was an unsuccessful Liberal candidate to the House of Commons of Canada for the riding of Jacques-Cartier in the 1900 federal election. He was elected to the Legislative Assembly of Quebec for the electoral district of Hochelaga in the 1904 election. A Liberal, he was re-elected in 1908, 1912, and 1916. In 1909, he was the Minister of Agriculture in the cabinet of Lomer Gouin. From 1909 to 1919, he was the Provincial Secretary. He did not run in 1919. He was appointed a judge in 1919.

He died in Montreal in 1927 and was buried in the Notre Dame des Neiges Cemetery.

The geographic township of Décarie in Sainte-Anne-du-Lac was named after him, and Décarie Boulevard in Montreal is named after his family.
