= Joseph-Georges Caron =

Canadian politician

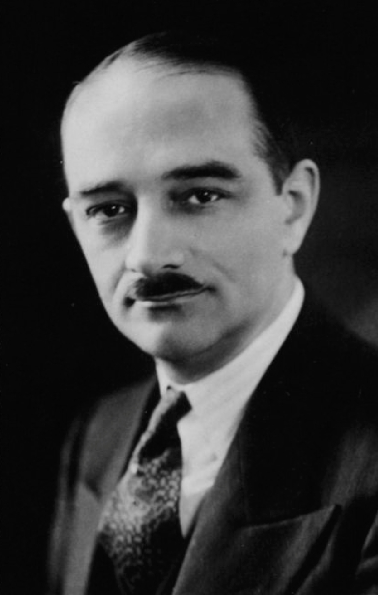

Member of the Legislative Assembly of Quebec for Maisonneuve
- In office 1939–1944
- Preceded by: William Tremblay
- Succeeded by: Joseph-François-Albert Gatien

Personal details
- Born: December 4, 1896 Maisonneuve (Montreal), Quebec
- Died: January 15, 1956 (aged 59) Montreal, Quebec
- Party: Liberal

Joseph-Georges Caron (December 4, 1896 – January 15, 1956) was a Canadian provincial politician.

Born in Maisonneuve (Montreal), Quebec, Caron was the member of the Legislative Assembly of Quebec for Maisonneuve from 1939 to 1944.
