= Daniel-Jérémie Décarie =

Canadian politician

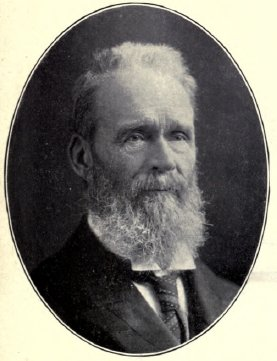

MLA for Hochelaga
- In office 1897–1904
- Preceded by: Joseph-Octave Villeneuve
- Succeeded by: Jérémie-Louis Décarie

Personal details
- Born: March 20, 1836 Montreal, Lower Canada
- Died: October 30, 1904 (aged 68) Notre-Dame-de-Grâce, Quebec
- Resting place: Notre Dame des Neiges Cemetery
- Party: Liberal

Daniel-Jérémie Décarie (French pronunciation: [danjɛl ʒeʁemi dekaʁi]; March 20, 1836 – October 30, 1904) was a Canadian politician.

Born in Montreal, the son of Jérémie Descary and Apolline Gougeon, Décarie was elected to the Legislative Assembly of Quebec for the electoral district of Hochelaga in 1897. A Liberal, he was re-elected without opposition in 1900. He died in office in 1904 and he was entombed at the Notre Dame des Neiges Cemetery in Montreal. His son, Jérémie-Louis Décarie was also a Quebec MLA.
