= Jean-Marie Pellerin =

Canadian politician

Member of the Legislative Assembly of Quebec for Maisonneuve
- In office 1923–1927
- Preceded by: Adélard Laurendeau
- Succeeded by: William Tremblay

Personal details
- Born: November 14, 1878 Sainte-Brigide-d'Iberville, Quebec
- Died: May 19, 1950 (aged 71) Montreal, Quebec
- Party: Conservative

Jean-Marie Pellerin (November 14, 1878 – May 19, 1950) was a Canadian politician.

Born in Sainte-Brigide-d'Iberville, Quebec, Pellerin was educated at Laval University in Quebec. He became a physician in 1904 and practiced in Montreal. He worked for the Department of Health and Child Welfare of the City of Montreal from June 1930 to November 1948.

He was a member of the Maisonneuve city council from 1915 to 1918. He was elected to the Legislative Assembly of Quebec for Maisonneuve in 1923. A Conservative, he did not run in 1927.

He died in Montreal, in 1950.
