= Joseph-Octave Villeneuve =

Canadian politician

The Honourable Joseph-Octave Villeneuve
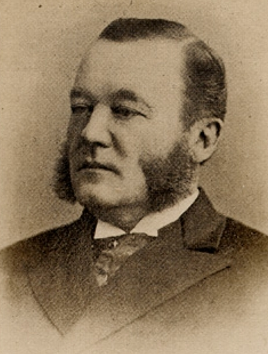

23rd Mayor of Montreal
- In office 1894–1896
- Preceded by: Alphonse Desjardins (politician)
- Succeeded by: Richard Wilson-Smith

Senator for De Salaberry, Quebec
- In office 1896–1901
- Appointed by: Mackenzie Bowell
- Preceded by: Joseph Tassé
- Succeeded by: Frédéric Liguori Béique

Member of the Legislative Assembly of Quebec for Hochelaga
- In office 1886–1887
- Preceded by: Louis Beaubien
- Succeeded by: Charles Champagne
- In office 1890–1896
- Preceded by: Charles Champagne
- Succeeded by: Daniel-Jérémie Décarie

Personal details
- Born: 4 March 1836 Sainte-Anne-des-Plaines, Lower Canada
- Died: 27 June 1901 (aged 65) Montreal, Quebec, Canada
- Profession: businessman

Joseph-Octave Villeneuve (French pronunciation: [ʒozɛf ɔktav vilnœv]; 4 March 1836 – 27 June 1901) was a Canadian businessman, provincial politician, and senator.

Entering business in Montreal, Villeneuve founded a firm of wholesale grocers and spirits merchants. As a businessman and local politician he acquired large commercial interests in Canada.

He was mayor of Saint-Jean-Baptiste from 1866 to 1886 and warden of Hochelaga county from 1866 to 1880. From 1894 to 1896, he was the Mayor of Montreal. He was the Legislative Assembly of Quebec member for Hochelaga from 1886 to 1888 and from 1890 to 1896.

In 1896, he was appointed to the Canadian Senate representing the senatorial division of De Salaberry, Quebec. A Conservative, he served until his death in 1901.

== Gallery ==
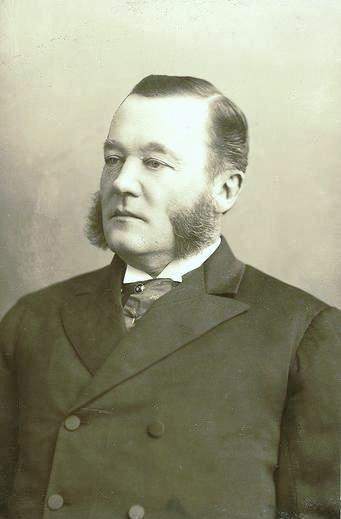
