= Hochelaga (provincial electoral district) =

Coordinates: 45.544°N 73.545°W

Quebec electoral district

Defunct provincial electoral district
- Legislature: National Assembly of Quebec
- District created: 1867
- District abolished: 1912
- First contested: 1867
- Last contested: 1908

Hochelaga (French pronunciation: [ɔʃlaɡa]) was a former provincial electoral district in the province of Quebec, Canada.

It was created for the 1867 election (and an electoral district of that name existed earlier in the Legislative Assembly of the Province of Canada). Its final election was in 1908. It disappeared in the 1912 election and was redistributed into Laval, Maisonneuve, Montréal-Dorion, Montréal-Laurier, Montréal-Hochelaga, Westmount, and Jacques-Cartier, with small parts going to Montréal–Saint-Georges and Montréal–Sainte-Marie.

It was named after the former aboriginal village of Hochelaga on the site where Montreal now stands. The village existed when the explorer Jacques Cartier discovered territories that became New France.

== Members of the Legislative Assembly ==
- Louis Beaubien, Conservative Party (1867–1886)
- Joseph-Octave Villeneuve, Conservative Party (1886–1887)
- Charles Champagne, Liberal (1888–1890)
- Joseph-Octave Villeneuve, Conservative Party (1890–1897)
- Daniel-Jérémie Décarie, Liberal (1897–1904)
- Jérémie-Louis Décarie, Liberal (1904–1912)
