= Adélard Laurendeau =

Canadian politician

Member of the Legislative Assembly of Quebec for Maisonneuve
- In office 1919–1923
- Preceded by: Jérémie-Louis Décarie
- Succeeded by: Jean-Marie Pellerin

Personal details
- Born: December 1, 1883 Montreal, Quebec
- Died: July 21, 1968 (aged 84) Montreal, Quebec
- Party: Ouvrier

Adélard Laurendeau (December 1, 1883 – July 21, 1968) was a politician in Quebec, Canada and a Member of the Legislative Assembly of Quebec (MLA).

== Early life ==
He was born on December 1, 1883, in Montreal. He became an industrial painter and a union activist.

== Political career ==
He ran as a Labour candidate in the district of Maisonneuve in the 1919 provincial election and won. He finished second in the 1923 election and was defeated by Conservative candidate Jean-Marie Pellerin.

== Death ==
He died on July 21, 1968.
