= Richard Wilson-Smith =

Canadian businessman and politician

Mayor Richard Wilson-Smith
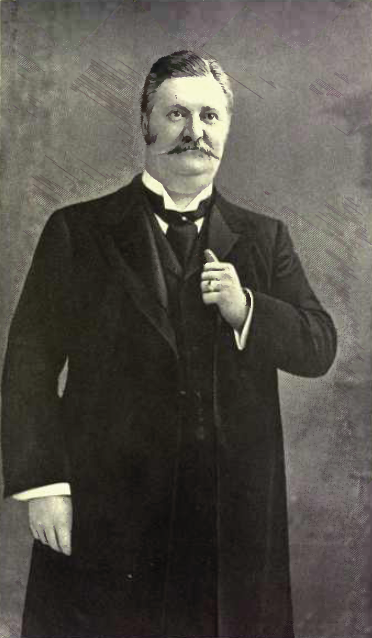

24th Mayor of Montreal
- In office 1896–1898
- Preceded by: Joseph-Octave Villeneuve
- Succeeded by: Raymond Préfontaine
- Constituency: Saint-Laurent

Personal details
- Born: 1852 Northern Ireland
- Died: 12 September 1912 (aged 59–60) Sainte-Agathe-des-Monts, Quebec, Canada
- Profession: financier, journalist

Richard Wilson-Smith (1852 – 12 September 1912) was a Canadian businessman and politician.

== Biography ==
Born in Ireland, Wilson-Smith emigrated to Canada in 1878 settling in Montreal, Quebec. A few years after arriving in Montreal, he became publisher and chief editor of the Insurance and Finance Chronicle. In 1893, he was elected to the Montreal City Council as an alderman for St. Lawrence Ward. In 1896, he was unanimously elected Mayor of Montreal for a two-year term. He ran unsuccessfully as the Conservative candidate for the House of Commons of Canada for the riding St. Lawrence in the 1896 federal election. In 1892, he became a member of the Montreal Board of Trade, and in 1898 he purchased a seat on the Montreal Stock Exchange.

He was one of the original directors of the Lachine Rapids Hydraulic and Land Company, which undertook successfully the development of the vast water power of the Lachine Rapids. He was President of the Canada Accident Company, a trustee of the Guardian Assurance Company, Vice-President of the Montreal Trust and Deposit Company, the National Security Company of New York and resident Vice-President of the American Surety Company.

== Gallery ==
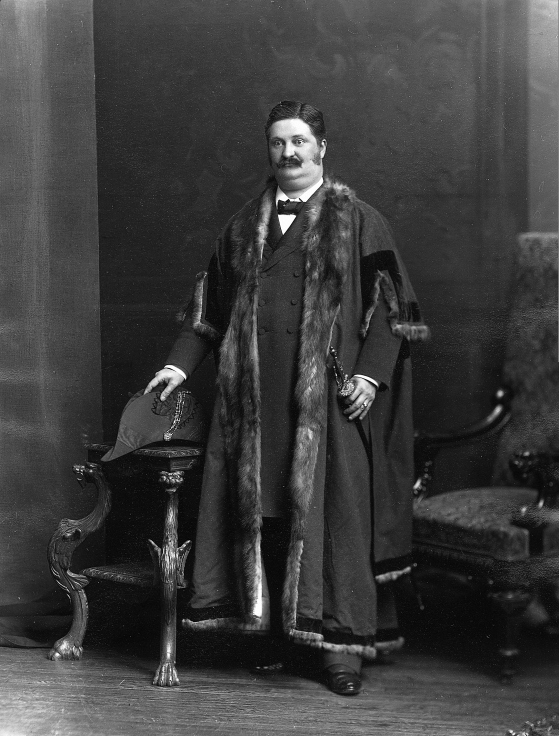
