= Maisonneuve (provincial electoral district) =

Coordinates: 48.359°N 71.317°W

Quebec electoral district

Defunct provincial electoral district
- Legislature: National Assembly of Quebec
- District created: 1912
- District abolished: 1988
- First contested: 1912
- Last contested: 1985

Maisonneuve (French pronunciation: [mɛzɔ̃nœv]) was a former provincial electoral district in the Montreal region of Quebec, Canada.

It was created for the 1912 election from part of Hochelaga electoral district. Its final election was in 1985. It disappeared in the 1989 election and its successor electoral district was Hochelaga-Maisonneuve.

It was named after the founder of Ville-Marie (now Montreal), Paul Chomedey de Maisonneuve.

== Members of the Legislative Assembly / National Assembly ==
- Jérémie-Louis Décarie, Liberal (1912–1919)
- Adélard Laurendeau, Parti ouvrier (1919–1923)
- Jean-Marie Pellerin, Conservative Party (1923–1927)
- William Tremblay, Parti Ouvrier (1927–1931)
- Charles-Joseph Arcand, Liberal (1931–1935)
- William Tremblay, Conservative Party – Union Nationale (1935–1939)
- Joseph-Georges Caron, Liberal (1939–1944)
- Joseph-François-Albert Gatien, Union Nationale (1944–1952)
- Alcide Montpetit, Liberal (1952–1956)
- Lucien Tremblay, Union Nationale (1956–1962)
- Marcel Dupré, Liberal (1962–1966)
- André Léveillé, Union Nationale (1966–1970)
- Robert Burns, Parti Québécois (1970–1979)
- Georges Lalande, Liberal (1979–1981)
- Louise Harel, Parti Québécois (1981–1989) (re-elected in Hochelaga-Maisonneuve in 1989)
