= Charles Champagne (Hochelaga MLA) =

Canadian politician

Member of the Legislative Assembly of Quebec for Hochelaga
- In office 1888–1890
- Preceded by: Joseph-Octave Villeneuve
- Succeeded by: Joseph-Octave Villeneuve

Personal details
- Born: July 25, 1849 Mirabel, Canada East
- Died: September 21, 1925 (aged 76) Montreal, Quebec
- Party: Liberal

Charles Champagne (French pronunciation: [ʃaʁl ʃɑ̃paɲ]; July 25, 1849 – September 21, 1925) was a lawyer and a political figure in Quebec. He represented Hochelaga in the Legislative Assembly of Quebec from 1888 to 1890 as a Liberal. His name also appears as Charles Laplante dit Champagne.

He was born in Saint-Augustin, Canada East, the son of Charles Laplante dit Champagne and Marie Brien dit Desrochers. He was educated at the Collège de Sainte-Thérèse and the Collège de Terrebonne. For a time, Champagne served as the personal secretary for Louis Riel. He was admitted to the Quebec bar in 1873 and set up practice in Sainte-Scholastique. Champagne married twice: Mary Jessey Fletcher in 1873 and Mary Louisa Fletcher, his first wife's sister, in 1883.

Champagne was an unsuccessful candidate for the Hochelaga electoral district in 1886, losing to Joseph-Octave Villeneuve, but was elected in an 1888 by-election held after Villeneuve's election was appealed. He was defeated by Villeneuve when he ran for reelection in 1890. Champagne was registrar for Montréal-Est from 1890 to 1922. He served on the town council for Rigaud from 1899 to 1906 and from 1910 to 1913 and was the mayor in 1913. Champagne died in Montreal at the age of 76 and was buried at Rigaud.
