= Thomas Tremblay =

Canadian judge

Thomas Tremblay, OC GOQ (December 13, 1895 – April 24, 1988) was a Canadian lawyer, politician, and judge.

Born in Saint-Roch-des-Aulnaies, Quebec, Tremblay received his secondary education at Collège Ste-Anne de La Pocatière. He received a Bachelor of Arts degree in 1916 and a law degree from Laval University in 1919. He was admitted to the bar the same year and he practiced in Quebec and Montmagny from 1919 to 1937, with various partners, including Armand Lavergne. He was made a King's Counsel in 1938.

He was a Conservative candidate in the riding of L'Islet in the provincial election of 1931 and Montmagny—L'Islet in the federal election of 1935. He was vice-president of the Société des alcools du Québec from 1937 to July 1938. In 1938, he was made a judge of the Court of Sessions of the Peace. In 1948, he became Chief Justice. In 1953, he was named chair of the Royal Commission of Inquiry on Constitutional Problems. He retired in 1969.

== Honours ==
In 1968, he was made an Officer of the Order of Canada "for his contribution to the legal profession". In 1988, he was made a Grand Officer of the National Order of Quebec.
