= William Tremblay (politician) =

Canadian politician

Member of the Legislative Assembly of Quebec for Maisonneuve
- In office 1927–1931
- Preceded by: Jean-Marie Pellerin
- Succeeded by: Charles-Joseph Arcand
- In office 1935–1939
- Preceded by: Charles-Joseph Arcand
- Succeeded by: Joseph-Georges Caron

Personal details
- Born: August 10, 1877 Chicoutimi, Quebec
- Died: November 15, 1973 (aged 96) Montreal, Quebec

William Tremblay (August 10, 1877 – November 15, 1973) was a politician in Quebec, Canada and a Member of the Legislative Assembly of Quebec (MLA).

== Early life ==
He was born on August 10, 1877, in Chicoutimi.

== First Attempt in Federal Politics ==
Tremblay ran as a Labour candidate in the district of Maisonneuve in the 1925 federal election and finished a distant third against Liberal incumbent Clément Robitaille.

== Member of the legislature ==
He ran as a Labor candidate in the district of Maisonneuve in the 1927 provincial election and won. He finished a distant third in the 1931 election and was defeated by Liberal candidate Charles-Joseph Arcand.

Tremblay was re-elected as a Conservative candidate in the 1935 election. He joined Maurice Duplessis's Union Nationale and was re-elected in the 1936 election.

== Cabinet Member ==
He served as Minister of Labour from 1936 until the 1939 election, when he was defeated by Liberal incumbent Joseph-Georges Caron.

== Last Attempt in Federal Politics ==
Tremblay ran as a Progressive Conservative candidate in the district of Maisonneuve—Rosemont in the 1945 federal election. He finished third against Liberal candidate Sarto Fournier.

== Death ==
He died on November 15, 1973.
