= Royal Commission of Inquiry on Constitutional Problems =

The Royal Commission of Inquiry on Constitutional Problems or Tremblay Commission was called for by the premier of Quebec, Maurice Duplessis in 1953. The commission, chaired by Mr. Justice Thomas Tremblay, studied the problem of tax sharing between different levels of government and greater constitutional problems in Canada.

The commission held 97 public meetings throughout Quebec, received 217 briefs, launched several studies, and finally published a five-volume report in 1956. It proposed a maximum level of taxation be established, the provincial responsibility for unemployment benefits, and a shared personal and corporate tax scheme between the federal and provincial governments.
