= List of nature centers in Massachusetts =

This is a list of nature centers and environmental education centers in the state of Massachusetts.

To use the sortable tables: click on the icons at the top of each column to sort that column in alphabetical order; click again for reverse alphabetical order.

Name	Location	County	Region	Summary
Arcadia Wildlife Sanctuary	Easthampton	Hampshire	Pioneer Valley	website, operated by the Massachusetts Audubon Society, 732 acres with 5 miles of trails
Arunah Hill Natural Science Center	Cummington	Hampshire	Pioneer Valley	website, 60 acres, 6 miles of trails, focus is astronomy, science and nature education
Bartholomew's Cobble	Sheffield	Berkshire	The Berkshires	329-acre National Natural Landmark, open space preserve, agricultural preserve, and bio-reserve, with visitor center
Blue Hills Trailside Museum	Milton	Norfolk	Greater Boston	Operated by the Massachusetts Audubon Society, interpretive center for the 7000-acre Blue Hills Reservation state park
Boston Nature Center and Wildlife Sanctuary	Mattapan	Suffolk	Greater Boston	website, 64 acres, operated by the Massachusetts Audubon Society, 2 miles of trails, located on the grounds of the old Boston State Hospital
Broad Meadow Brook Conservation Center and Wildlife Sanctuary	Worcester	Worcester	Worcester County	website, 430 acres, operated by the Massachusetts Audubon Society
Broadmoor Wildlife Sanctuary	Natick	Middlesex	Greater Boston	website, 854 acres with 9 miles of trails, Saltonstall Nature Center, operated by the Massachusetts Audubon Society
Camp Nihan	Saugus	Essex	North Shore	65 acres, managed by the Department of Conservation and Recreation (Massachusetts)
Cape Cod Museum of Natural History	Brewster	Barnstable	Cape Cod	website, natural history exhibits, aquarium, steward of 400-plus acres of museum-owned land in Stony Brook Valley and Brewster
Capen Hill Nature Sanctuary	Charlton	Worcester	Worcester County	website, 86 acres
Drumlin Farm Wildlife Sanctuary	Lincoln	Middlesex	Greater Boston	website, 232 acres, operated by the Massachusetts Audubon Society
Daniel Webster Wildlife Sanctuary	Marshfield	Plymouth	Plymouth County	507 acres, operated by the Massachusetts Audubon Society, managed by North River Wildlife Sanctuary
EcoTarium	Worcester	Worcester	Worcester County	Natural history and science museum, live animals, 50 acres, tree canopy, planetarium
Felix Neck Wildlife Sanctuary	Edgartown	Dukes	Martha's Vineyard	website, 321 acres, operated by the Massachusetts Audubon Society on Martha's Vineyard
Great Falls Discovery Center	Turners Falls	Franklin	Pioneer Valley	website, 4 acres, interpretive center for the Silvio O. Conte National Fish and Wildlife Refuge, Connecticut River Watershed's natural, cultural and industrial history
Green Briar Nature Center	East Sandwich	Barnstable	Cape Cod	website, operated by the Thornton W. Burgess Society, adjacent to the 57-acre Briar Patch Conservation Area
Habitat Education Center and Wildlife Sanctuary	Belmont	Middlesex	Greater Boston	website, 93 acres, operated by the Massachusetts Audubon Society, located 6 miles northwest of downtown Boston
Hitchcock Center for the Environment	Amherst	Hampshire	Pioneer Valley	website, located on the 20-acre Larch Hill Conservation Area
Ipswich River Wildlife Sanctuary	Topsfield	Essex	North Shore	Operated by the Massachusetts Audubon Society, 2,800-acre preserve with over 12 miles of interconnecting trails
Joppa Flats Education Center and Wildlife Sanctuary	Newburyport	Essex	North Shore	website, 52 acres, operated by the Massachusetts Audubon Society, located near the Parker River National Wildlife Refuge and the Plum Island estuary
Lloyd Center for the Environment	South Dartmouth	Bristol	Southeastern Massachusetts	55 acres, focuses on coastal and watershed issues and conducting research on coastal ecosystems and endangered species
Marion Natural History Museum	Marion	Plymouth	Plymouth County	website, specializes in the natural history of local coastal and offshore areas
Moose Hill Wildlife Sanctuary	Sharon	Norfolk	Greater Boston	1,984 acres, operated by the Massachusetts Audubon Society, features 25 mile trail system
Museum of American Bird Art at Mass Audubon	Canton	Norfolk	Greater Boston	website, operated by the Massachusetts Audubon Society, located on the 124-acre Mildred Morse Allen Wildlife Sanctuary
North River Wildlife Sanctuary	Marshfield	Plymouth	Plymouth County	184 acres, operated by the Massachusetts Audubon Society
Norcross Wildlife Sanctuary	Wales	Hampden	Pioneer Valley	About 8,000 acres, maintained by the Norcross Wildlife Foundation
Oak Knoll Wildlife Sanctuary	Attleboro	Bristol	Southeastern Massachusetts	website, 50 acres, operated by the Massachusetts Audubon Society
Pleasant Valley Wildlife Sanctuary	Lenox	Berkshire	The Berkshires	website, 1,142 acres, operated by the Massachusetts Audubon Society
Sheep Hill	Williamstown	Berkshire	The Berkshires	website, 50-acre former dairy farm with nature exhibits, operated by the Williamstown Rural Lands Foundation
Sherburne Nature Center	Tyngsborough	Middlesex	Greater Boston	website, 80 acres, operated by the Town
South Shore Natural Science Center	Norwell	Plymouth	Plymouth County	website, located on 30 acres surrounded by 200 acres of town conservation/recreation land
Stony Brook Wildlife Sanctuary	Norfolk	Norfolk	Greater Boston	website, 86 acres, operated by the Massachusetts Audubon Society
Wachusett Meadow Wildlife Sanctuary	Princeton	Worcester	Worcester County	website, 1,011 acres, operated by the Massachusetts Audubon Society
Wellfleet Bay Wildlife Sanctuary	South Wellfleet	Barnstable	Cape Cod	website, 944 acres, operated by the Massachusetts Audubon Society, Esther Underwood Johnson Nature Center contains two 700-gallon aquariums

== Resources ==
- Massachusetts Environmental Education Society
