= Charles Stoddard =

Charles Stoddard may refer to:

- Charles Warren Stoddard (1843–1909), American author and editor
- Charles Stoddard, pen name of Charles S. Strong (1906–1962), American author
- Charles Stoddard, pen name of Henry Kuttner
- Charles G. Stoddard, of Stoddard-Dayton
- Charles Fuller Stoddard, of the American Piano Company
- Charles Stoddard, Director of the Bureau of Land Management from 1963 to 1966
- Charles Stoddard, a character in A Child for Sale
- Charles Dudley Stoddard, former owner of North River Wildlife Sanctuary
- Charles A. Stoddard, US delegate to Second International Congress on Education of the Deaf in 1880
