= Boston Nature Center =

Wildlife refuge in Massachusetts

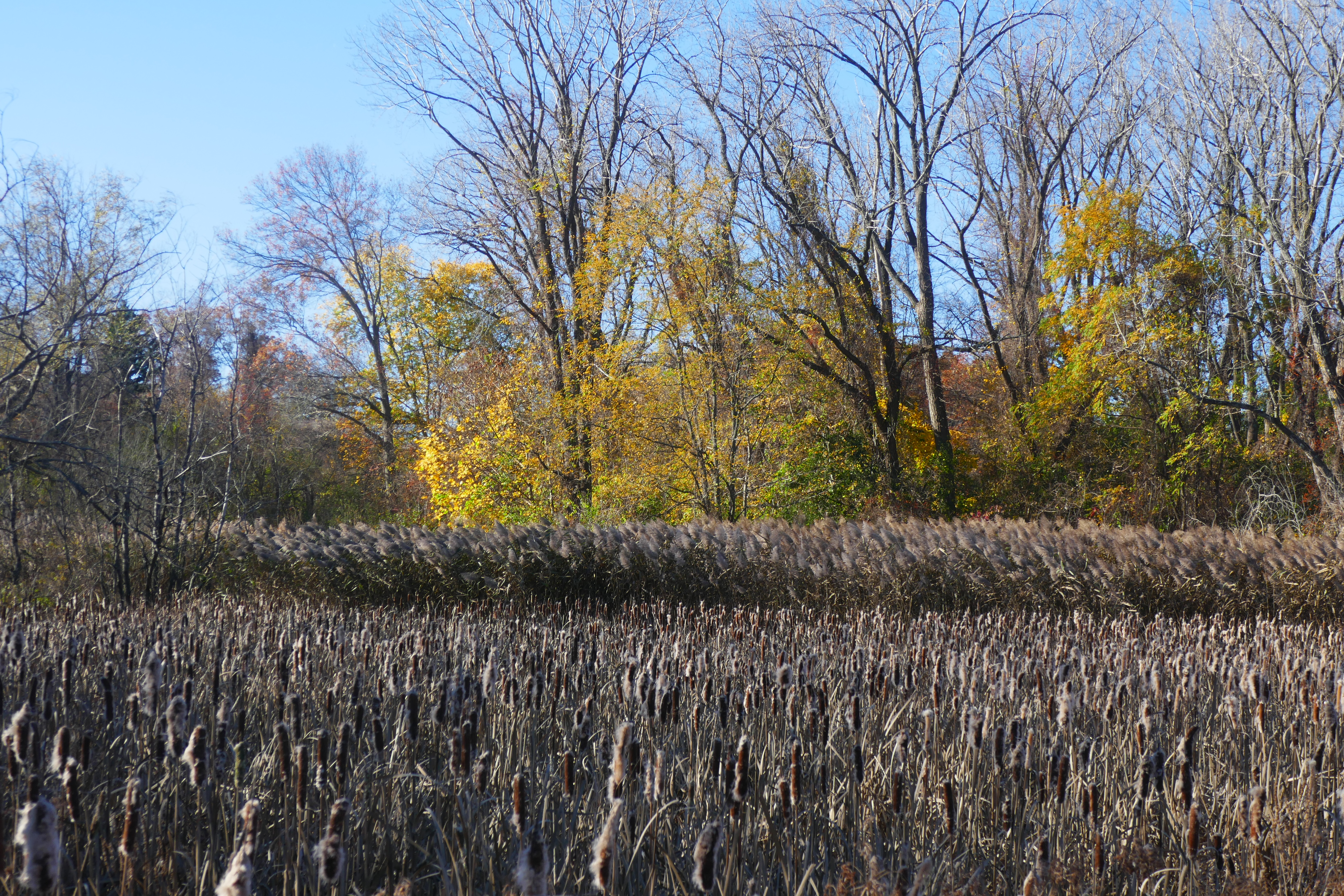
- Interactive map of Boston Nature Center
- Type: Wildlife sanctuary, nature center
- Location: 500 Walk Hill Street; Boston, Massachusetts, U.S.
- Coordinates: 42°17′17″N 71°06′04″W
- Area: 67 acres (27 ha)
- Created: 2000
- Operator: Massachusetts Audubon Society
- Hiking trails: 2 miles
- Website: Boston Nature Center

Boston Nature Center in the Mattapan neighborhood of Boston, Massachusetts is a 67-acre (27 ha) wildlife refuge of the Massachusetts Audubon Society that opened in 2002 with the dedication of a new building, the George Robert White Environmental Conservation Center. "On the former grounds of the Boston State Hospital, the Boston Nature Center is a community-based urban sanctuary. Trails and boardwalks traverse meadows and wetlands, home to over 150 species of birds, 40 species of butterflies, and more than 350 species of plants. Year-round programs help foster an appreciation for nature and the environment."

The center's 2020 Strategic Plan sets out numerous goals in three broad areas: Connect People and Nature for the Benefit of Both, Protect and Care for Land and Habitats of Significance, and Address the Challenges of Climate Change.

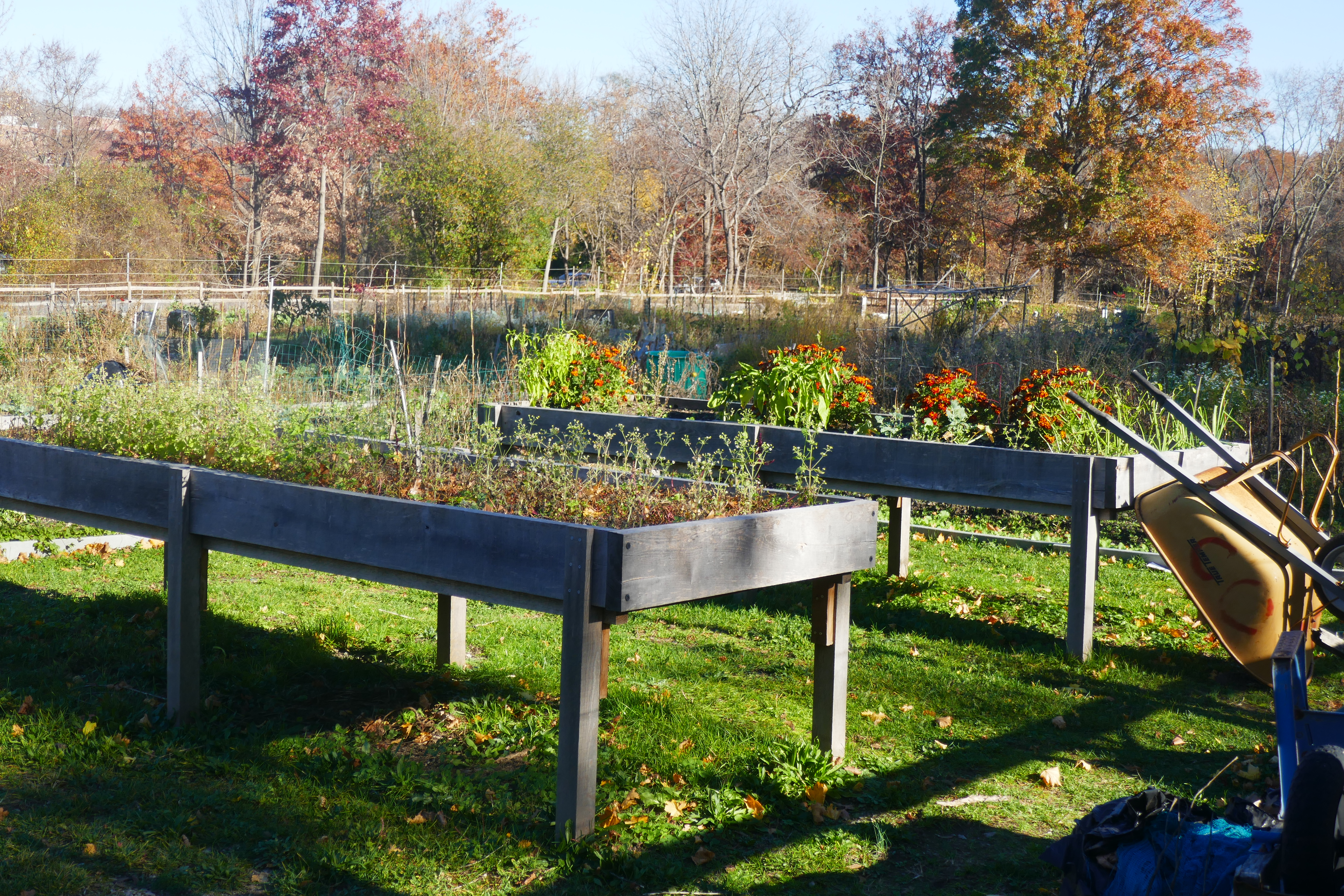
Community garden at Mass Audubon Boston Nature Center

A portion of the Nature Center's land has been used since 1969 as the Clark Cooper Community Garden. The garden, which is managed by the Boston Food Forest Coalition, makes 300 individual plots available to community members.

== Gallery ==
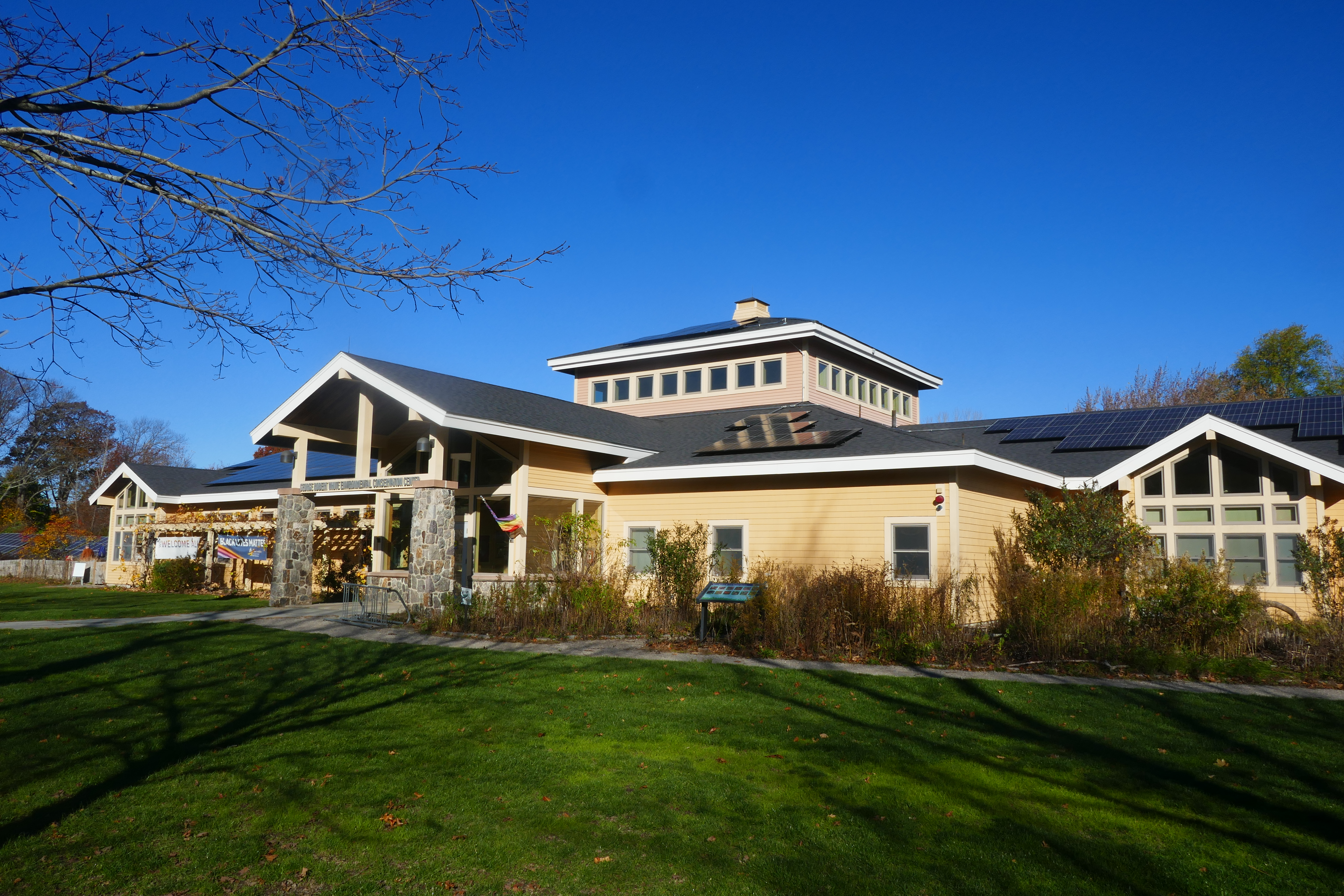

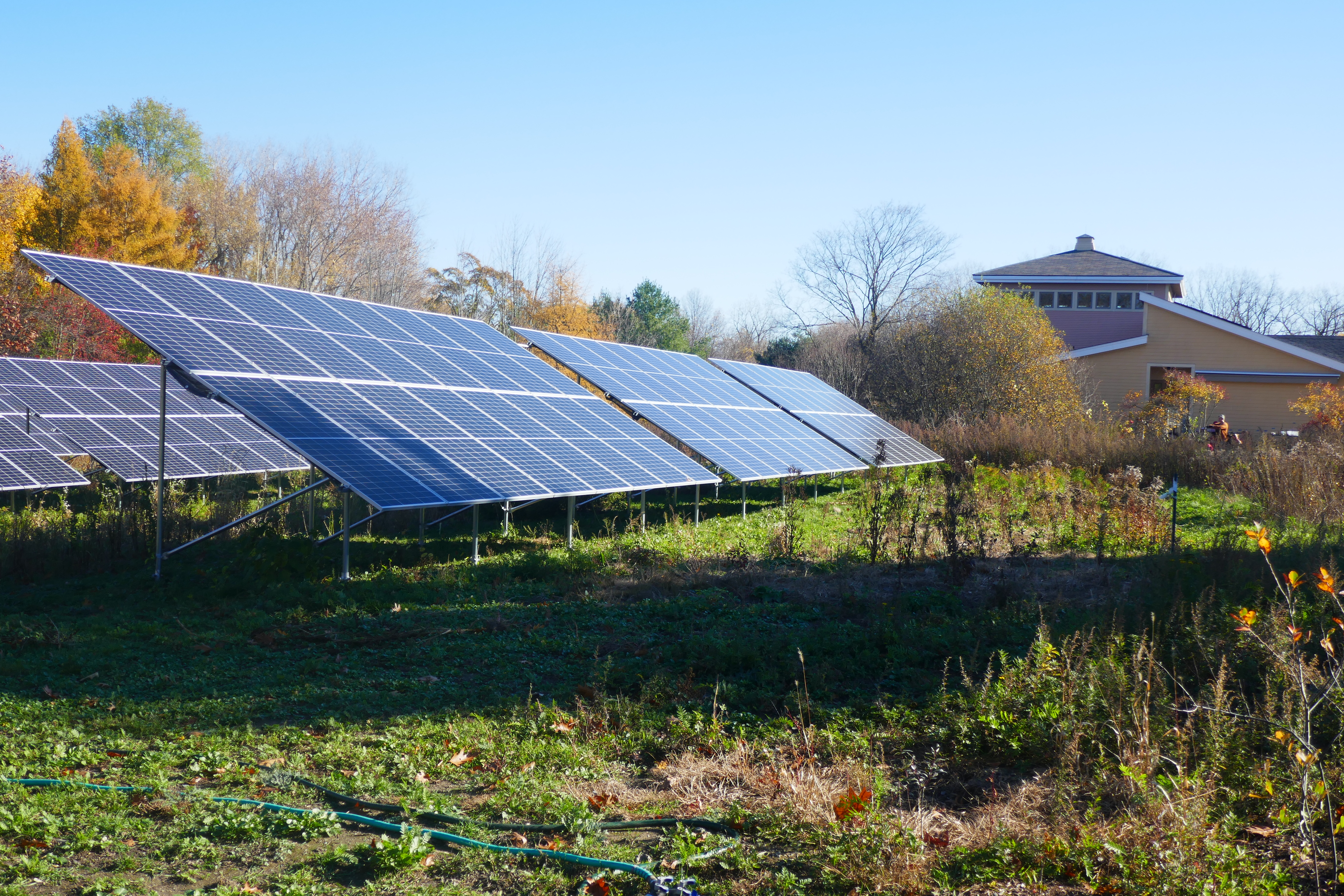

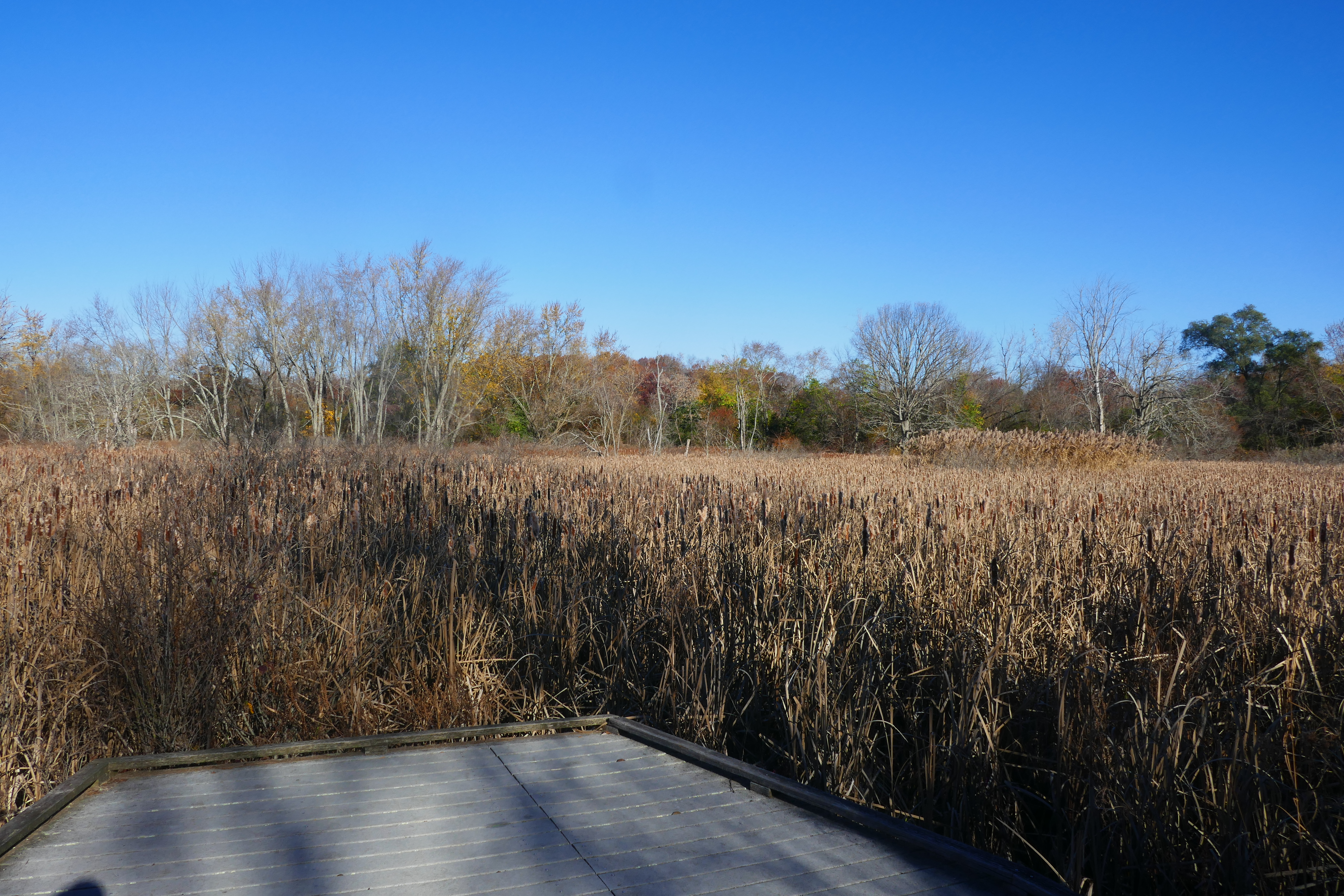

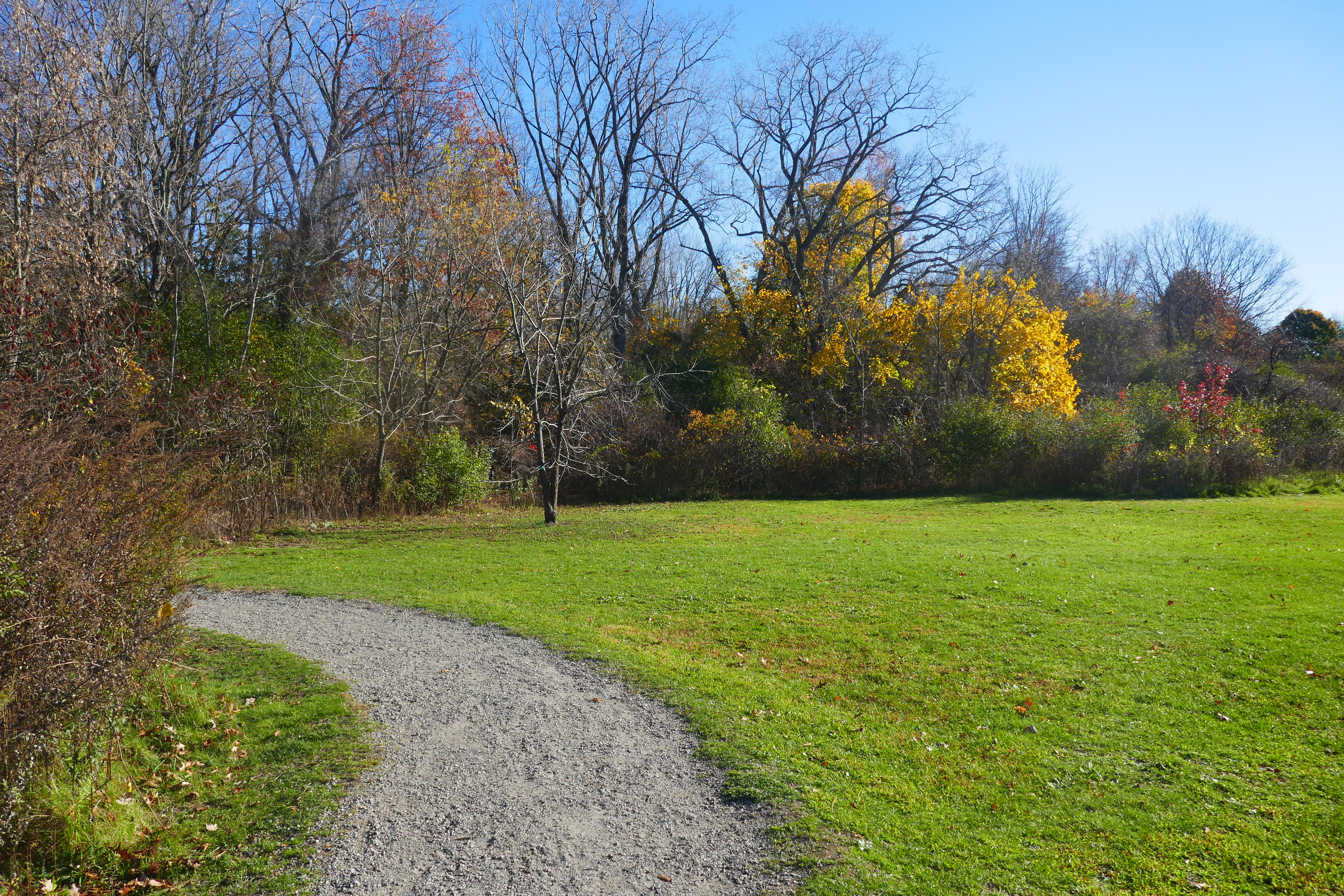
