= Wachusett Meadow Wildlife Sanctuary =

Wildlife sanctuary in Princeton, Massachusetts

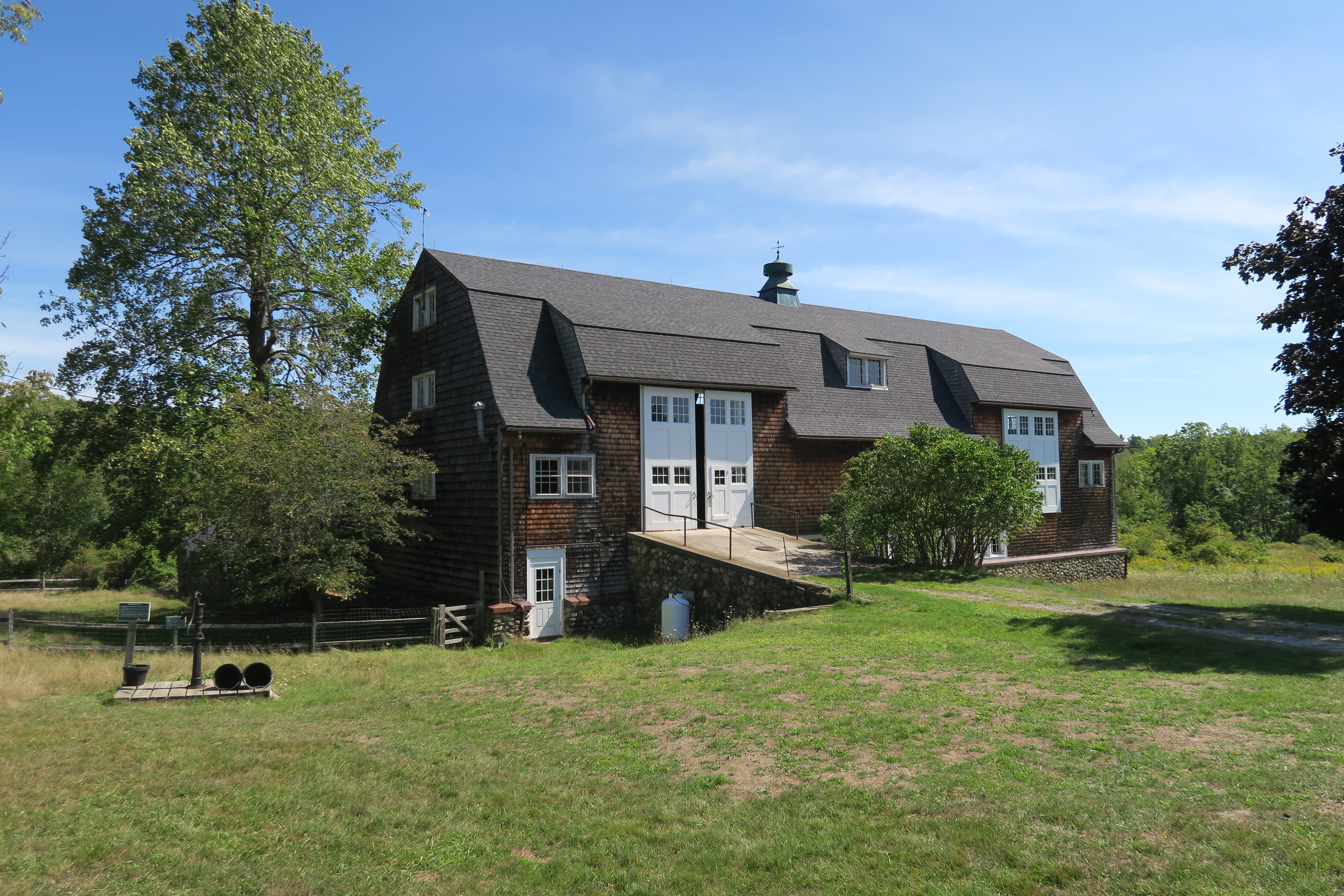
- Interactive map of Wachusett Meadow Wildlife Sanctuary
- Type: Wildlife sanctuary, nature center
- Location: 113 Goodnow Road; Princeton, Massachusetts, USA
- Coordinates: 42°27′21″N 71°54′20″W
- Area: 1,135 acres (459 ha)
- Operator: Massachusetts Audubon Society
- Hiking trails: 12 miles
- Website: Wachusett Meadow Wildlife Sanctuary

Wachusett Meadow Wildlife Sanctuary is a 1,135 acres (459 ha) wildlife sanctuary located in Princeton, Massachusetts, owned by the Massachusetts Audubon Society. Charles T. Crocker III donated 600 acres of land along with several buildings to Mass Audubon in 1956. The former farmstead includes a nature center, 12 miles of trails through woodlands, wetlands, and meadows, and a large pond with canoe rentals in season.

== Land and trails ==
The sanctuary is regarded as one of the best hawk-watching sites in New England. The Midstate Trail passes through the sanctuary.

== Programs ==
Wachusett Meadow has an outdoor summer day camp, seasonal special events, and year-round educational programs for preschoolers to adults.

== See also ==
- List of nature centers in Massachusetts
