= Canoe Meadows Wildlife Sanctuary =

Wildlife sanctuary in Massachusetts, US

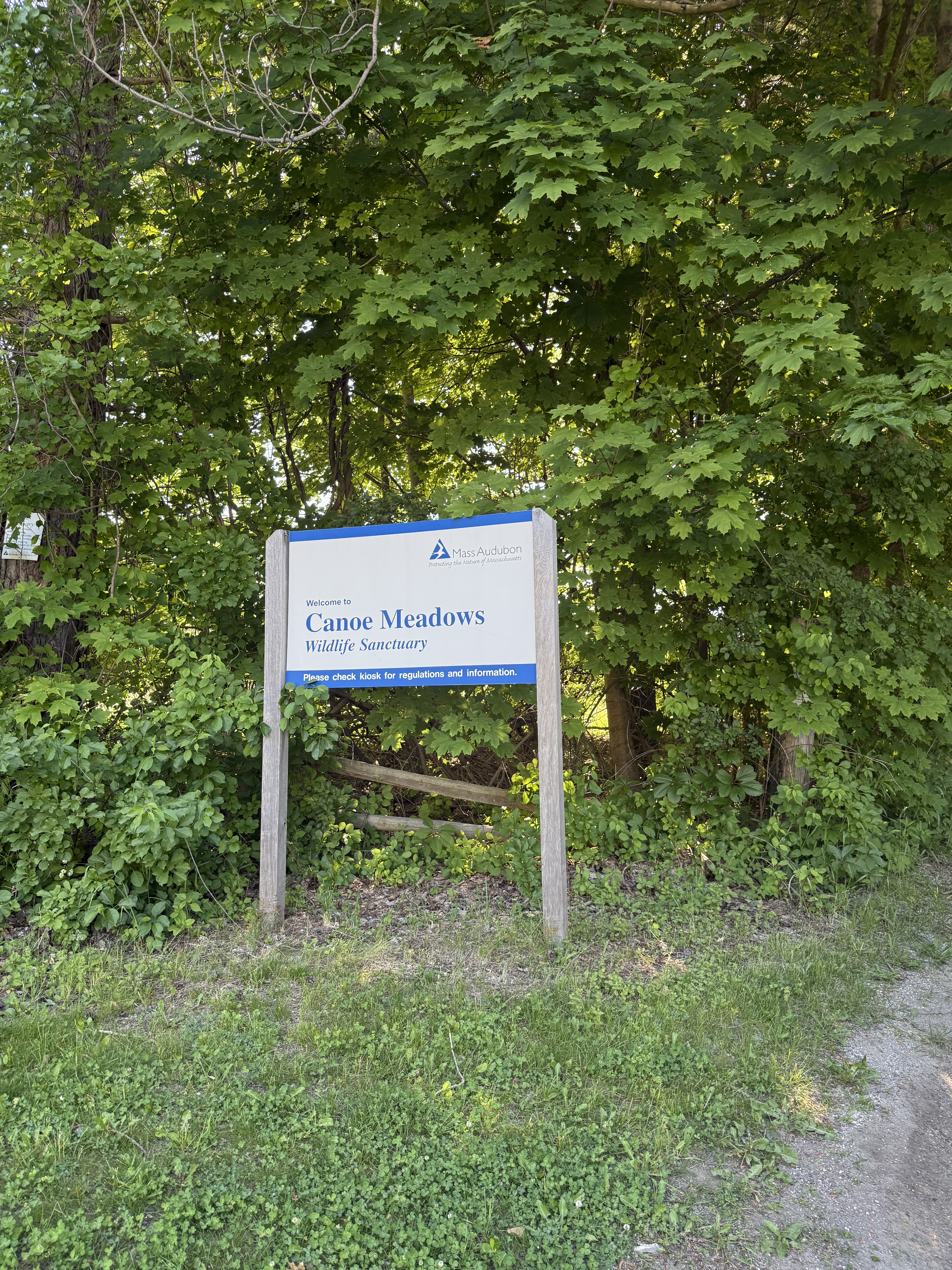
- Interactive map of Canoe Meadows Wildlife Sanctuary
- Type: Wildlife sanctuary
- Location: 309 Holmes Road; Pittsfield, Massachusetts, US
- Coordinates: 42°25′43″N 73°13′57″W
- Area: 253 acres (102 ha)
- Created: 1975
- Operator: Massachusetts Audubon Society
- Website: Official website

Canoe Meadows Wildlife Sanctuary is a 253-acre (1.02 km^{2}) wildlife sanctuary located in Pittsfield, Massachusetts. The sanctuary, managed by the Massachusetts Audubon Society, is flanked by the Housatonic River on its southwestern border and contains hiking trails suitable for birdwatching, observing other wildlife, and scenic viewing. The sanctuary also contains a 4.5-acre (1.8 ha) community garden, from which local residents may rent garden plots measuring 300 square feet (28 m^{2}).

== History ==
The sanctuary was founded in 1975, when Mrs. Cooley Graves Crane donated her Pittsfield estate to the Massachusetts Audubon Society. Early historical documents indicate that the Mohican tribe often landed their canoes along the Housatonic River in this area.

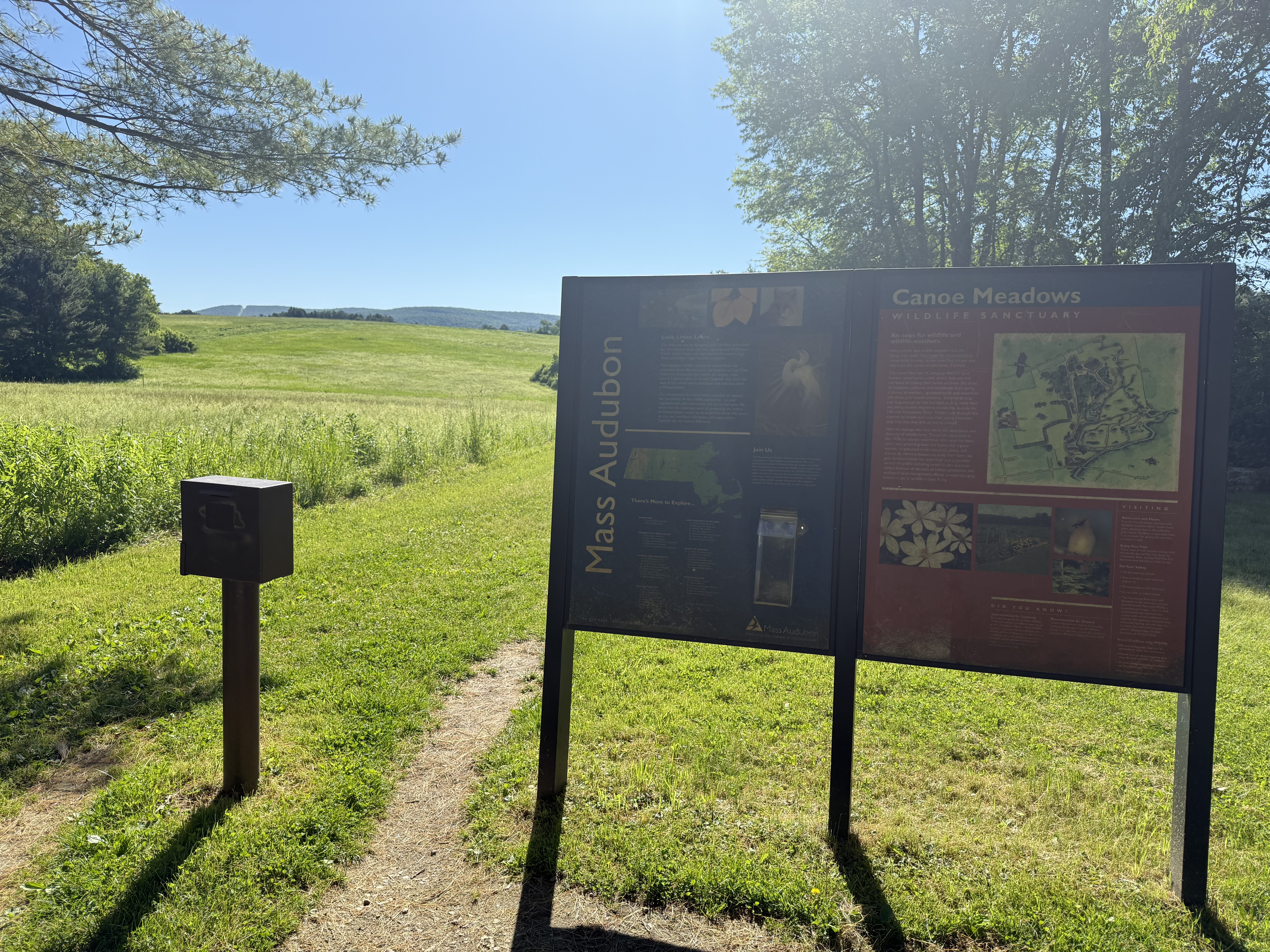
Canoe Meadows a Mass Audubon property in Pittsfield, MA, June 2026

This practice was a source of inspiration for Oliver Wendell Holmes, Sr., who named his nearby summer home "Canoe Meadow" in homage to these activities. The name of the sanctuary also originates from this historical context.

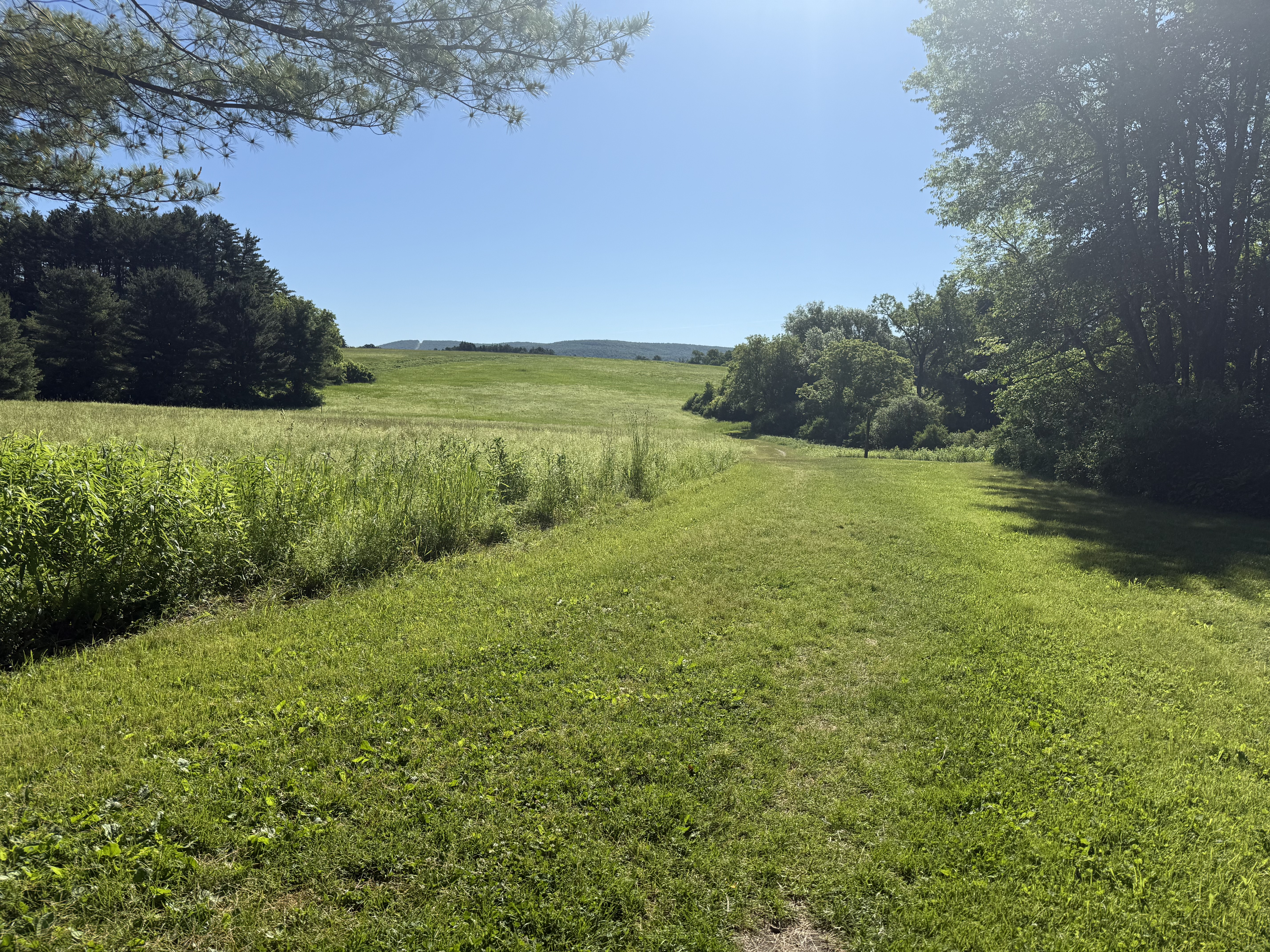
Canoe Meadows a Mass Audubon property in Pittsfield, MA, June 2026

== Hiking trails ==
The sanctuary contains two main hiking trails, each of which is relatively flat.

Sacred way Trail loops through the southwest portion of the sanctuary and is sometimes flooded from heavy rains and beaver activity.

The Wolf Pine Trail forms a loop through the central and eastern areas of the sanctuary. At the trail's eastern point, hikers can extend their journey by following the Owl Trail. This trail expands the Wolf Pine Trail's extent, beginning at one spot on Wolf Pine and rejoining it at another.

== Projects ==
The Massachusetts Audubon Society indicates one recently completed as well as one ongoing project associated with the sanctuary.

The first project involved the restoration of flow of Sackett Brook, a tributary of the Housatonic River, by removal of the Sackett Brook dam, which was constructed in the 1930s, artificially blocking the tributary's flow into the Housatonic. The dam was successfully removed and the tributary restored in November 2013.

The second project is ongoing and involves cleanup of toxic PCB contaminants from the adjacent Housatonic River and the sanctuary grounds itself. Once initiated, this project is estimated to require 13 years to complete.

== Gallery ==
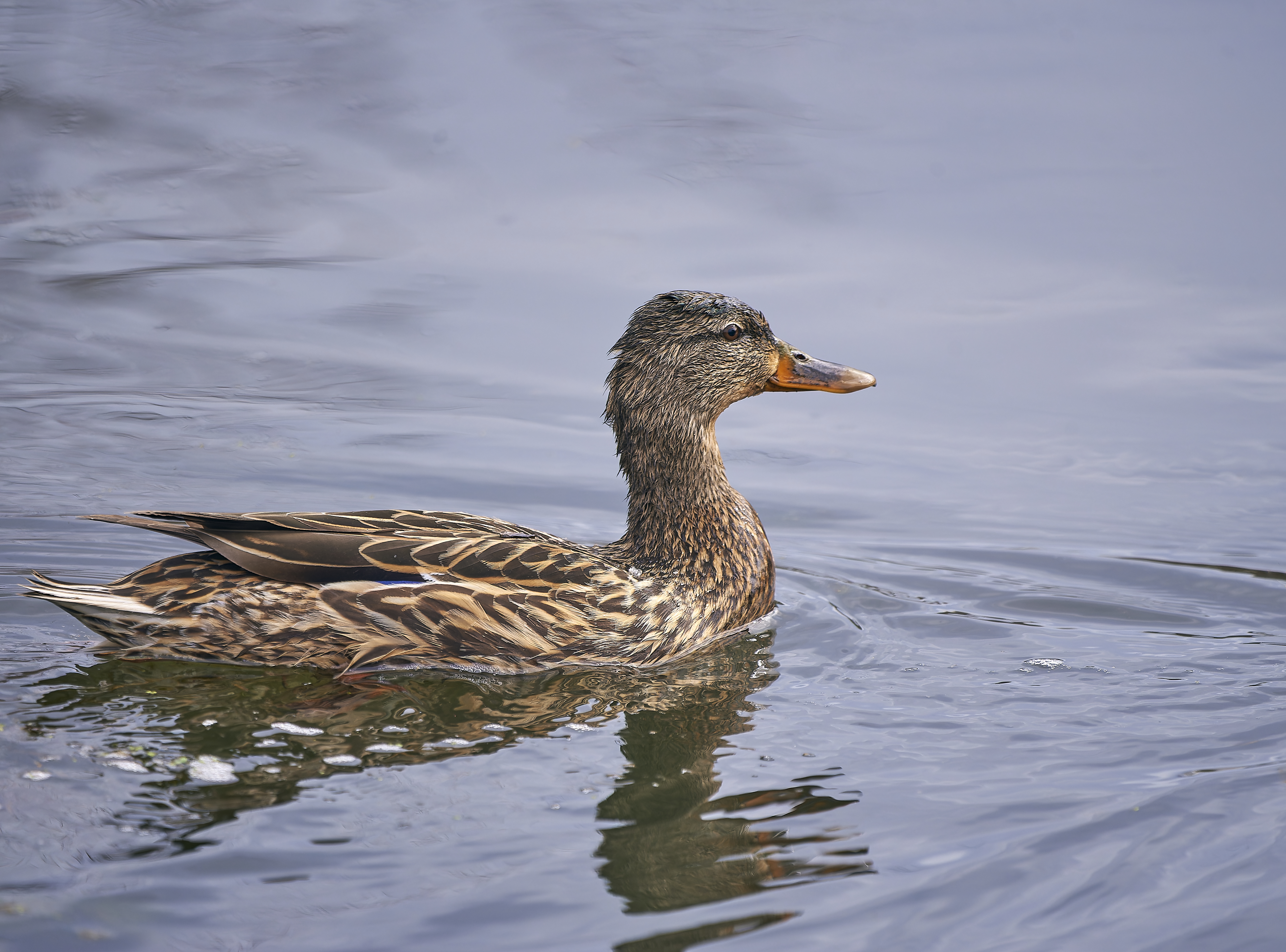
Mallard hen in West Pond

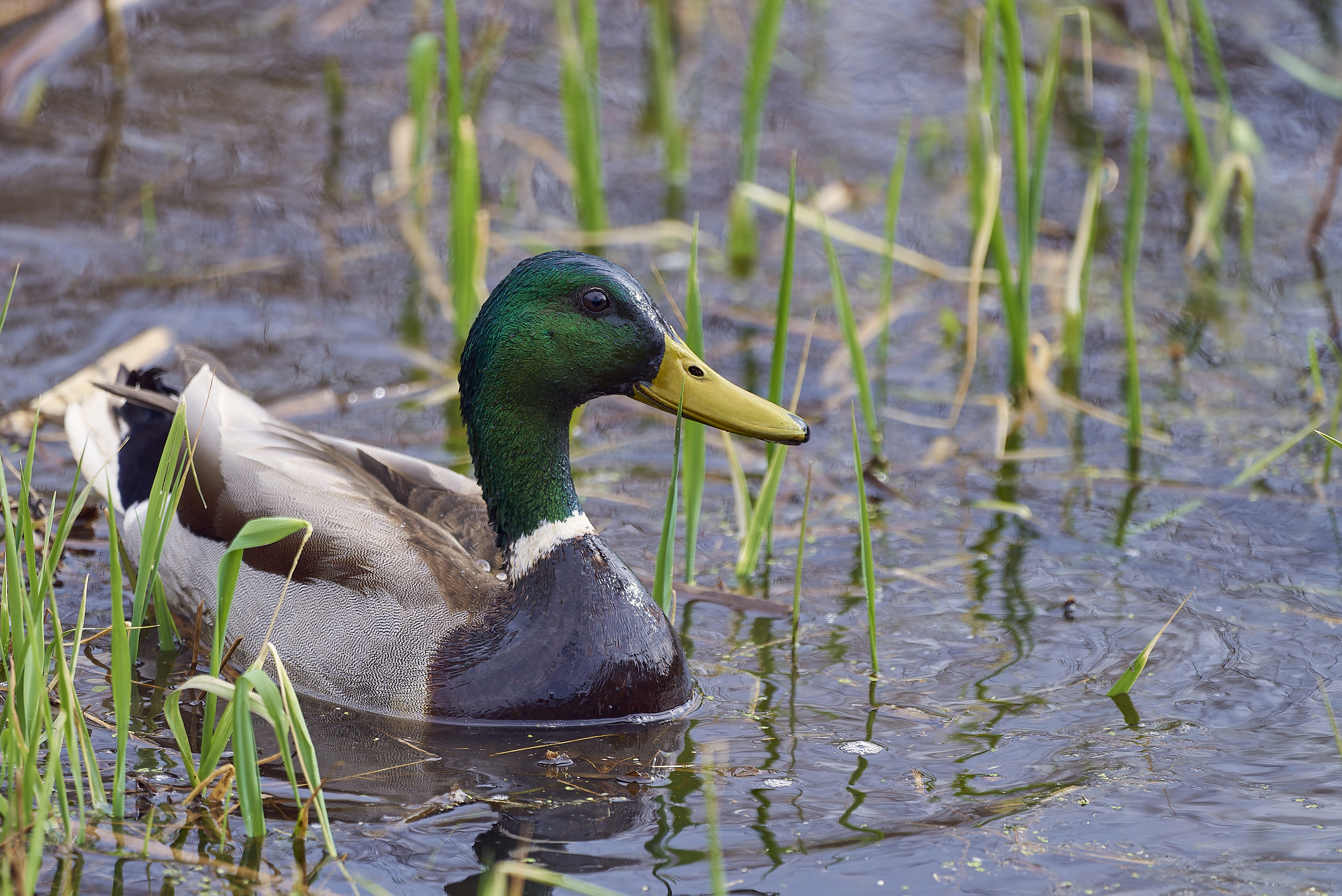
Mallard drake in West Pond

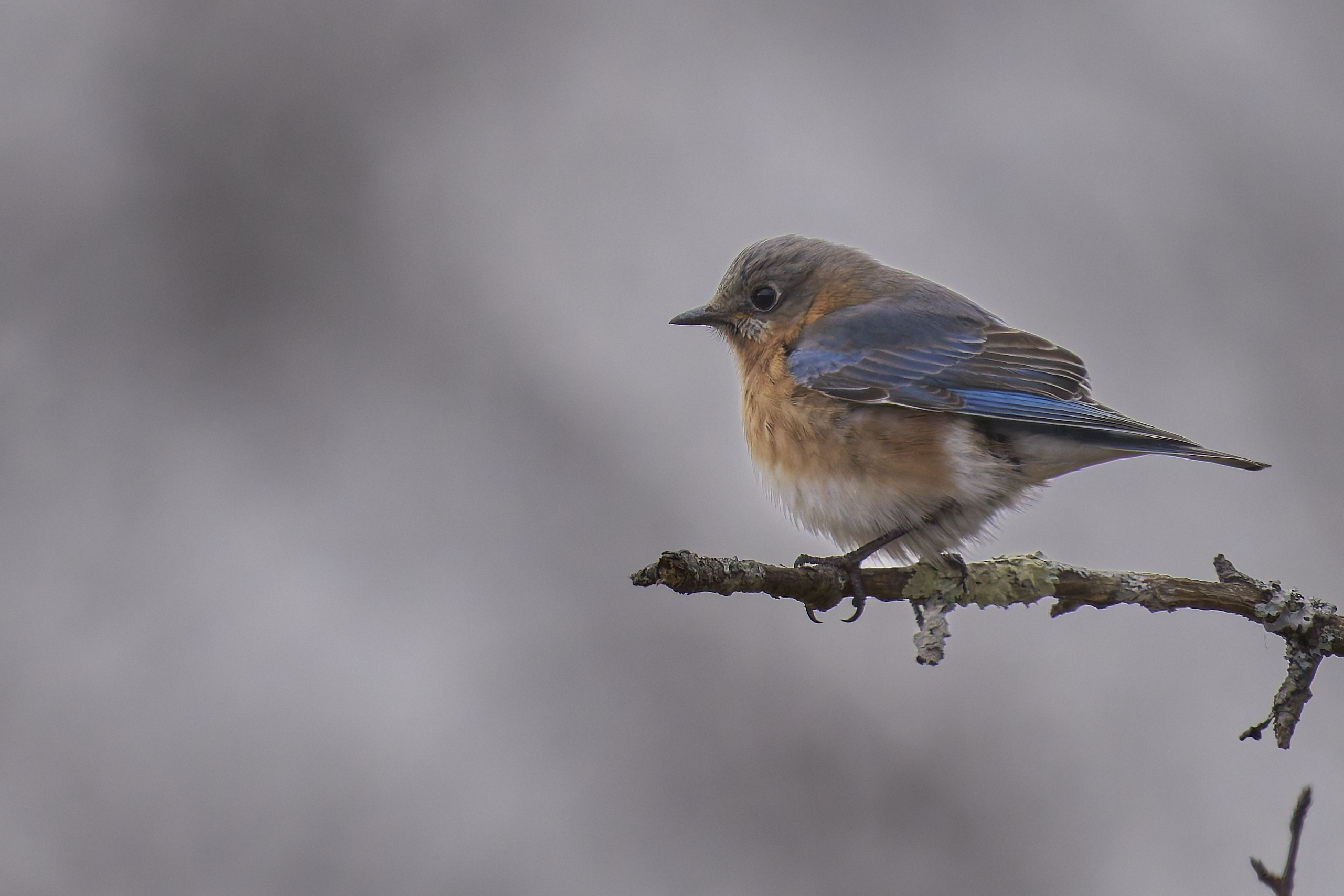
Eastern Bluebird

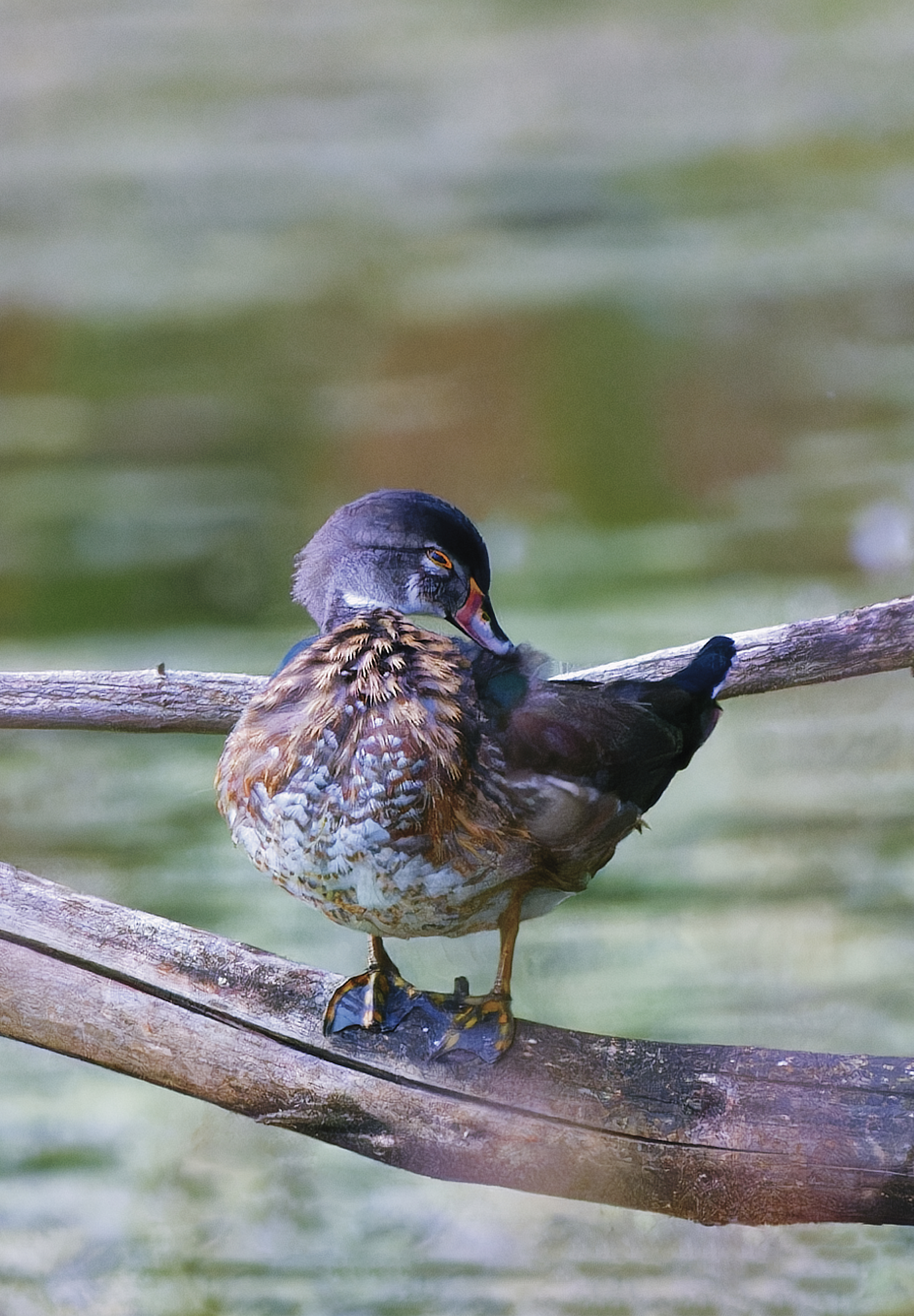
Wood duck

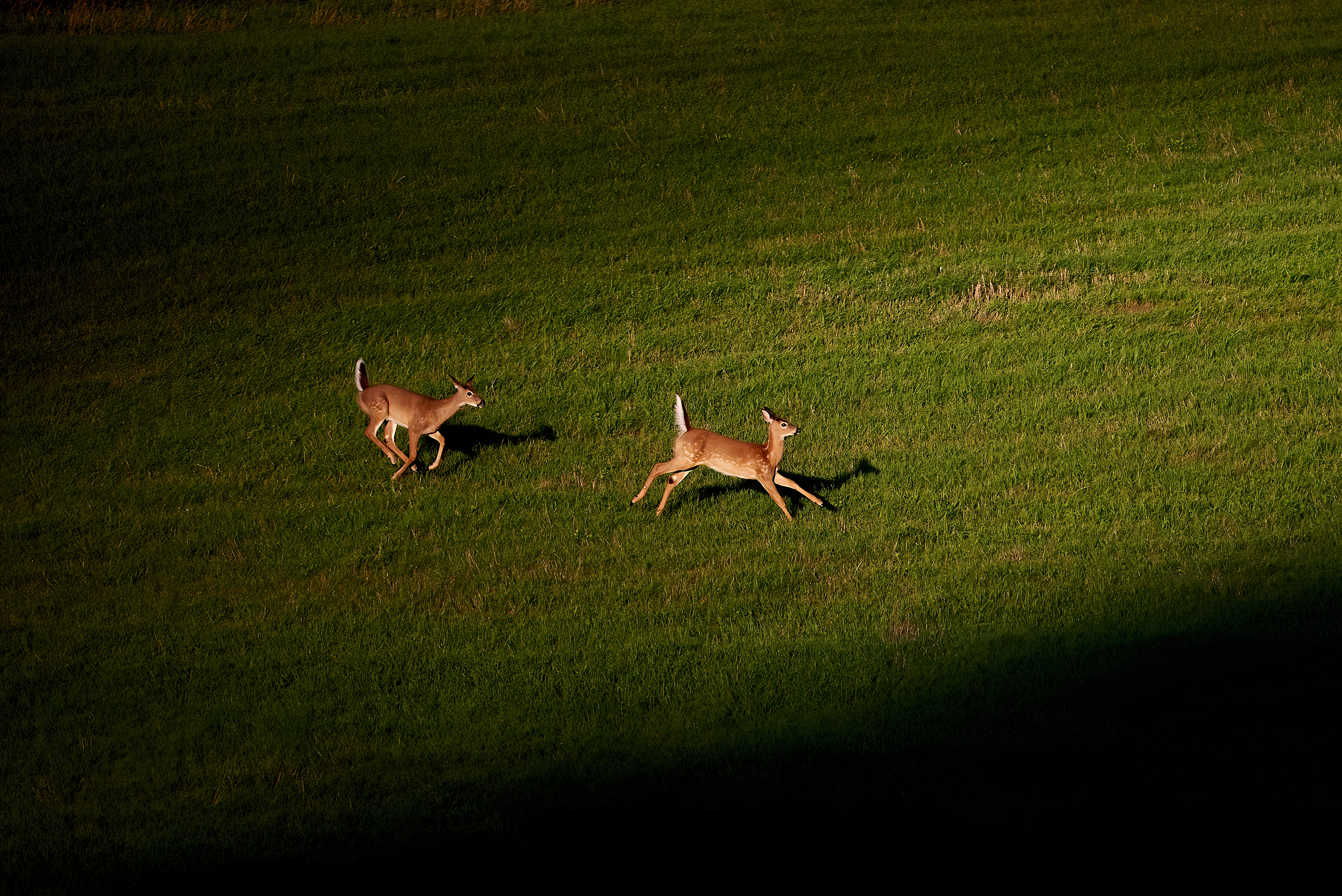
White-tailed deer, sunset

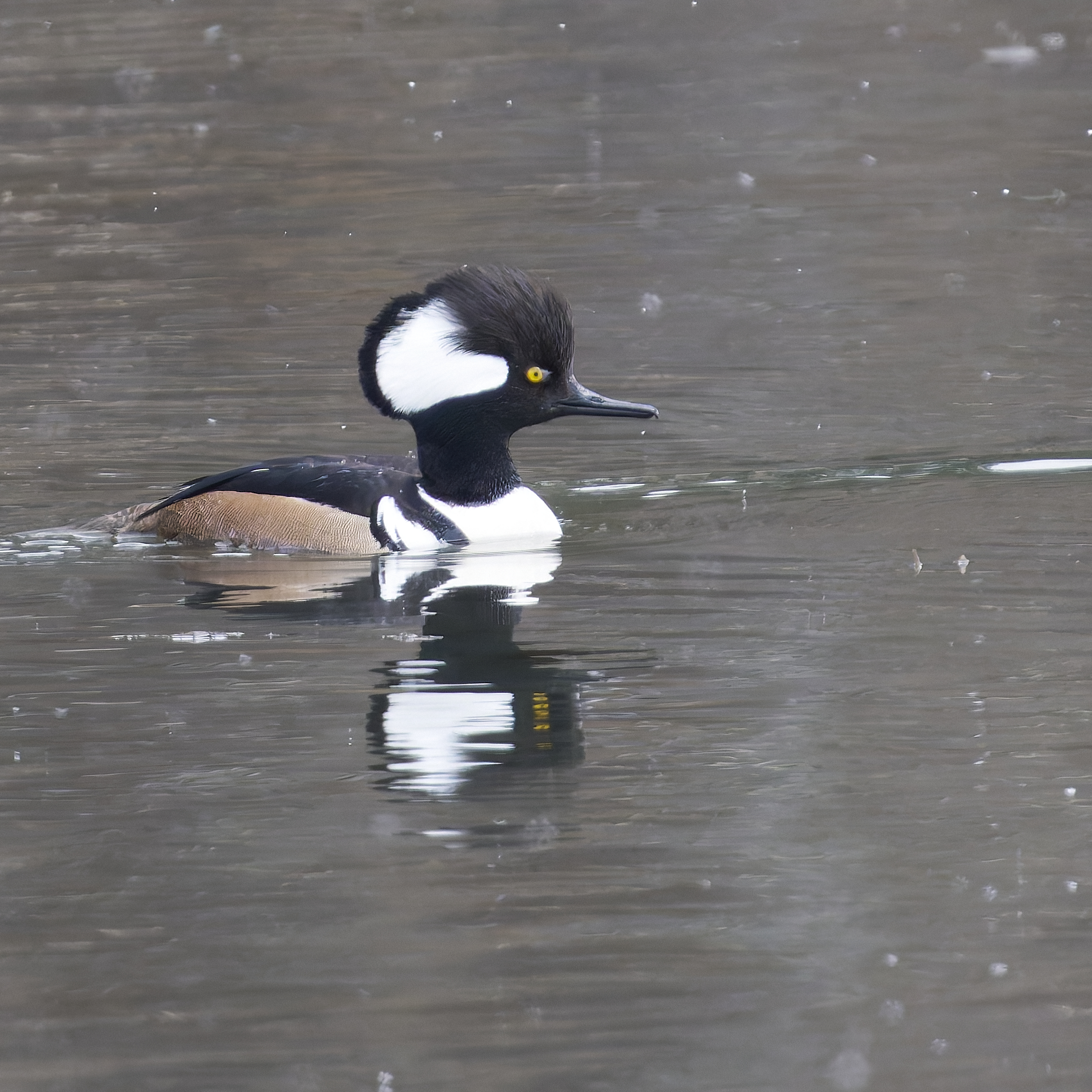
Hooded merganser in West Pond

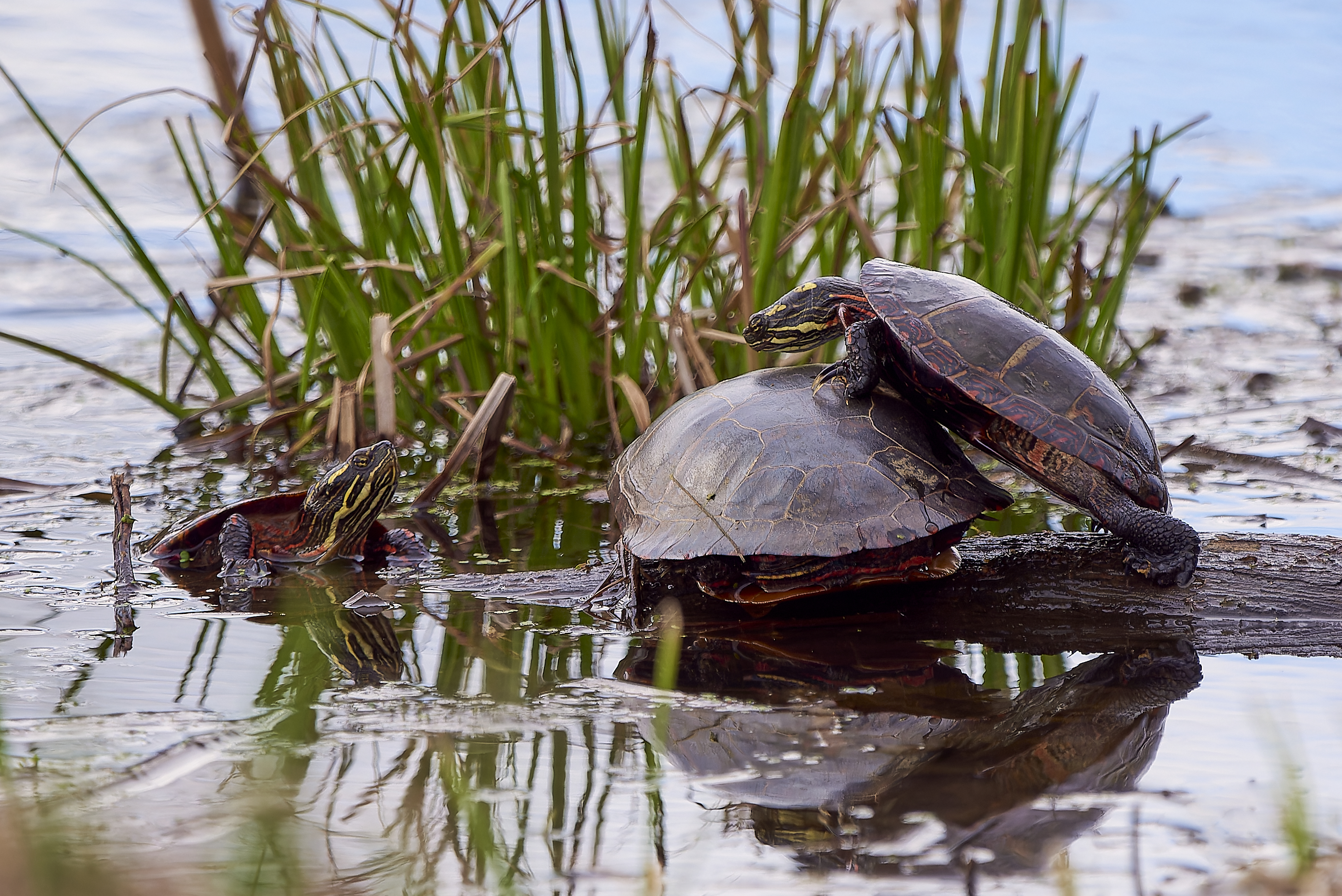
Painted turtles

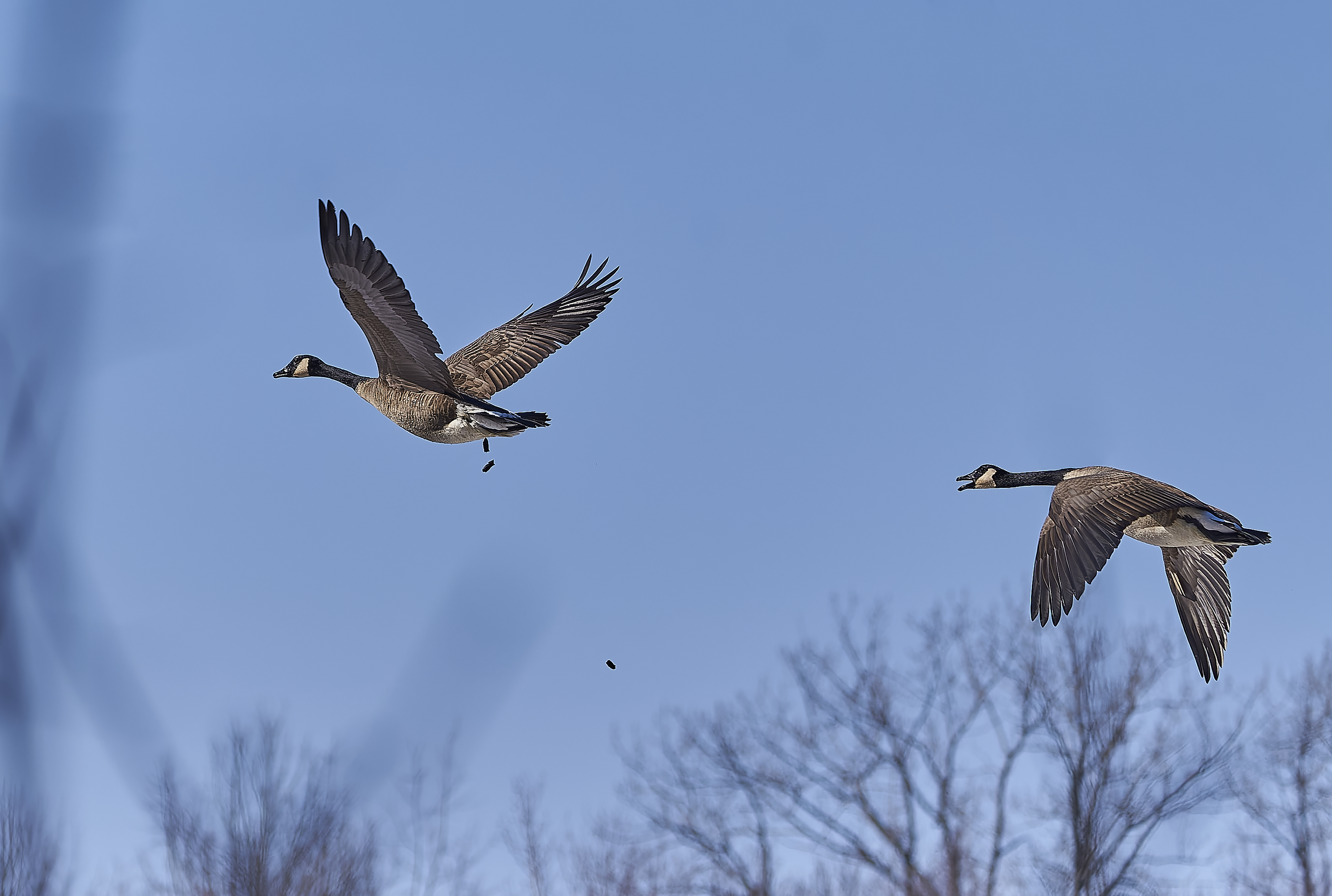
Canada geese

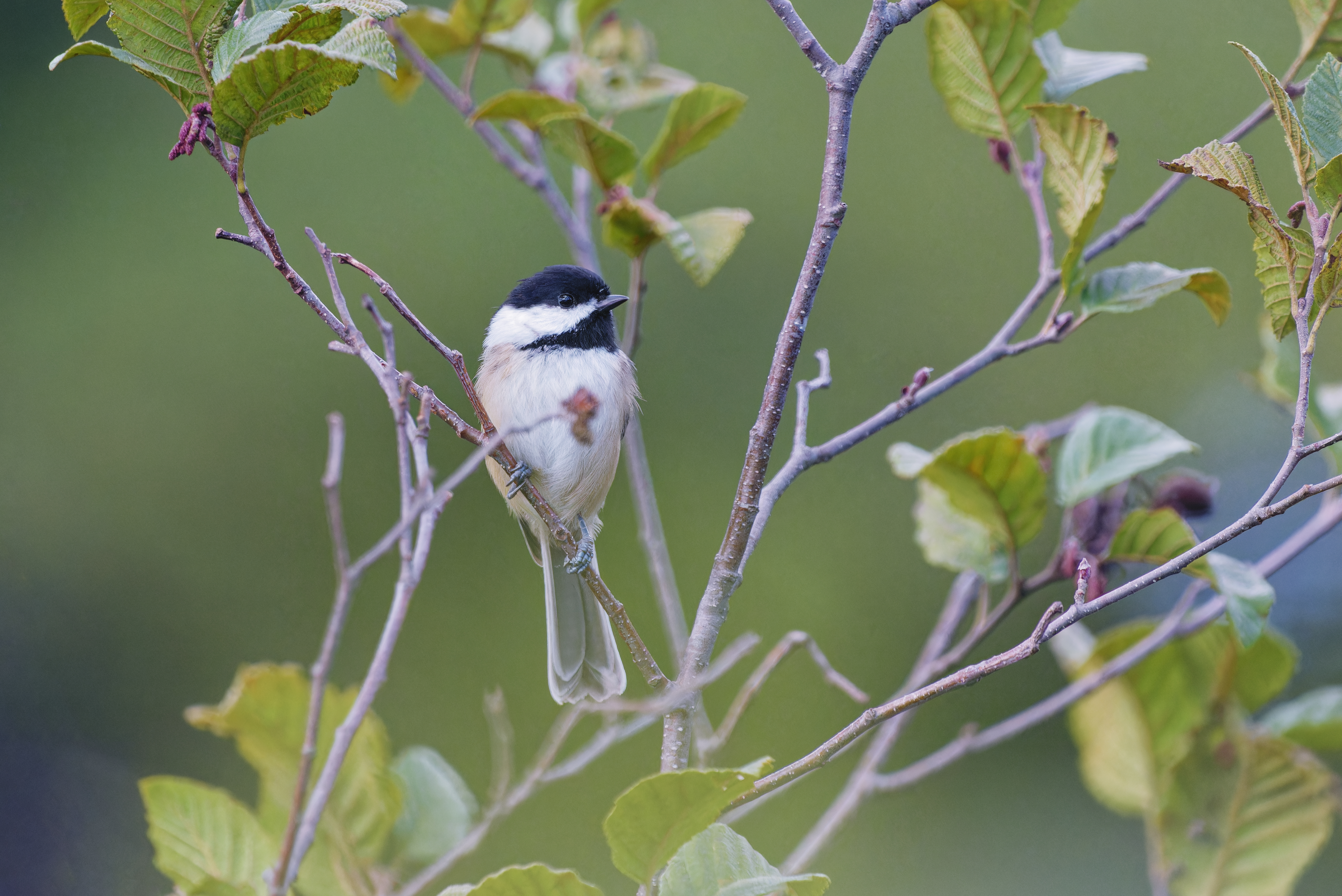
Black-capped chickadee

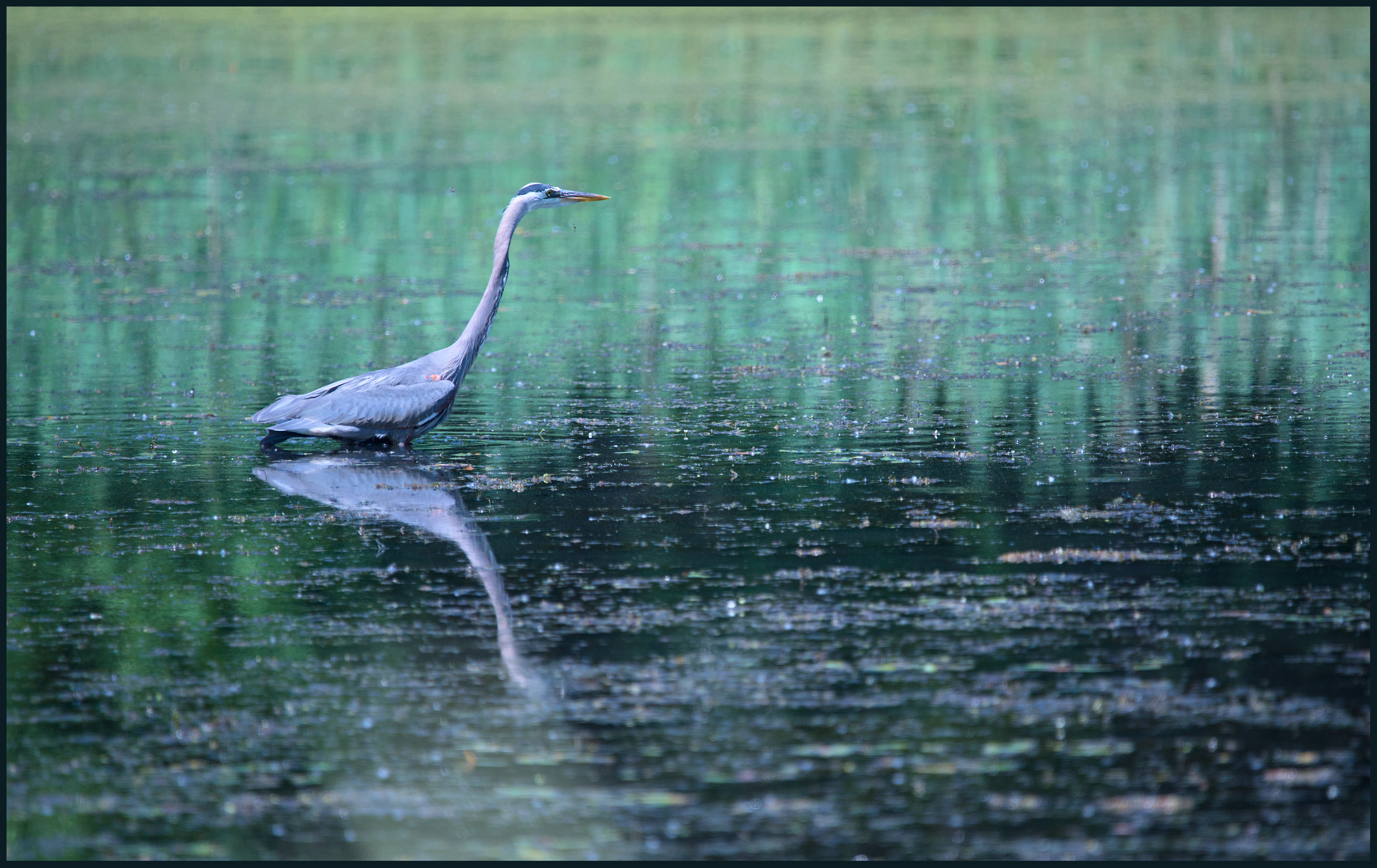
Great blue heron in West Pond

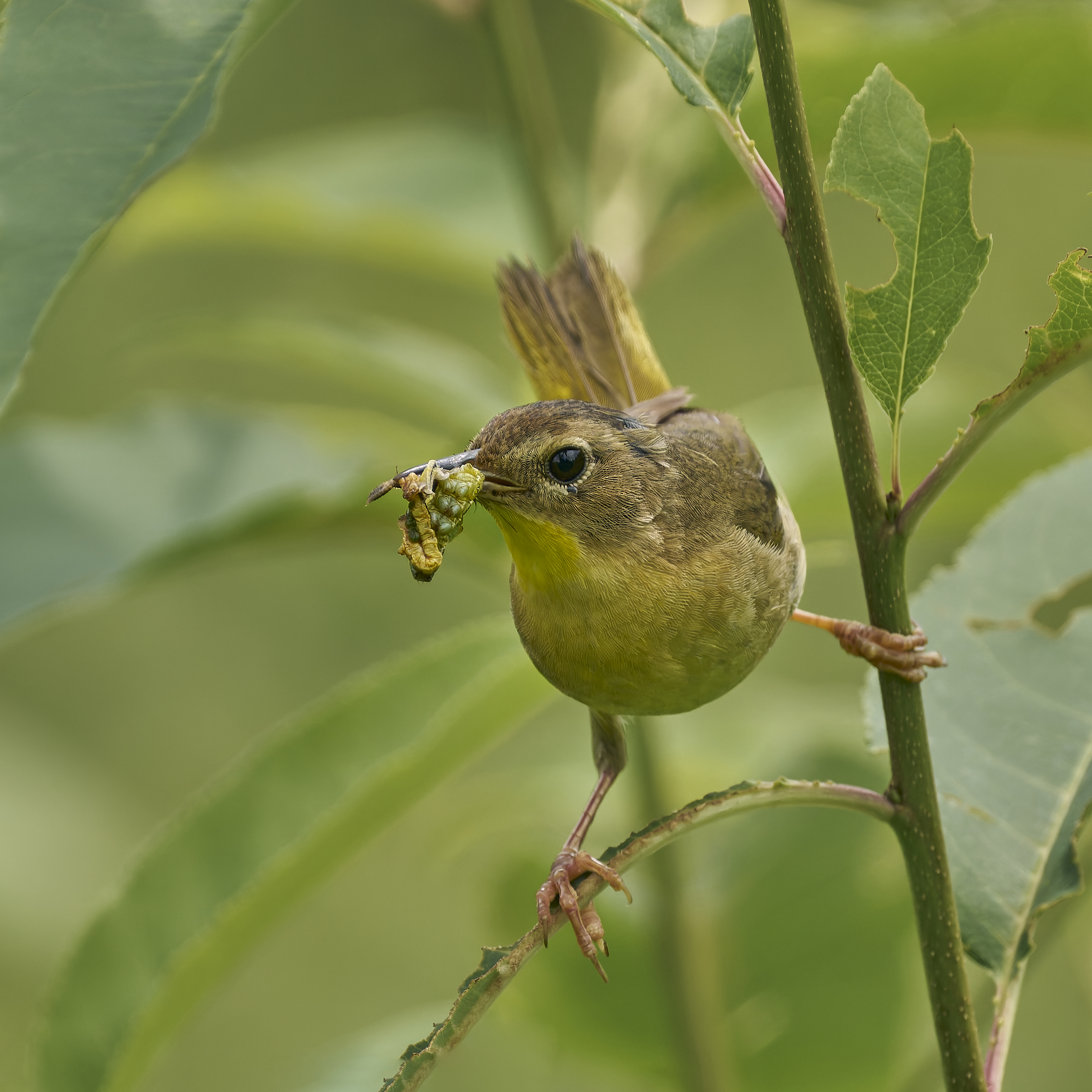
Common Yellowthroat with prey.
