= Oak Knoll Wildlife Sanctuary =

Wildlife sanctuary in Massachusetts, US

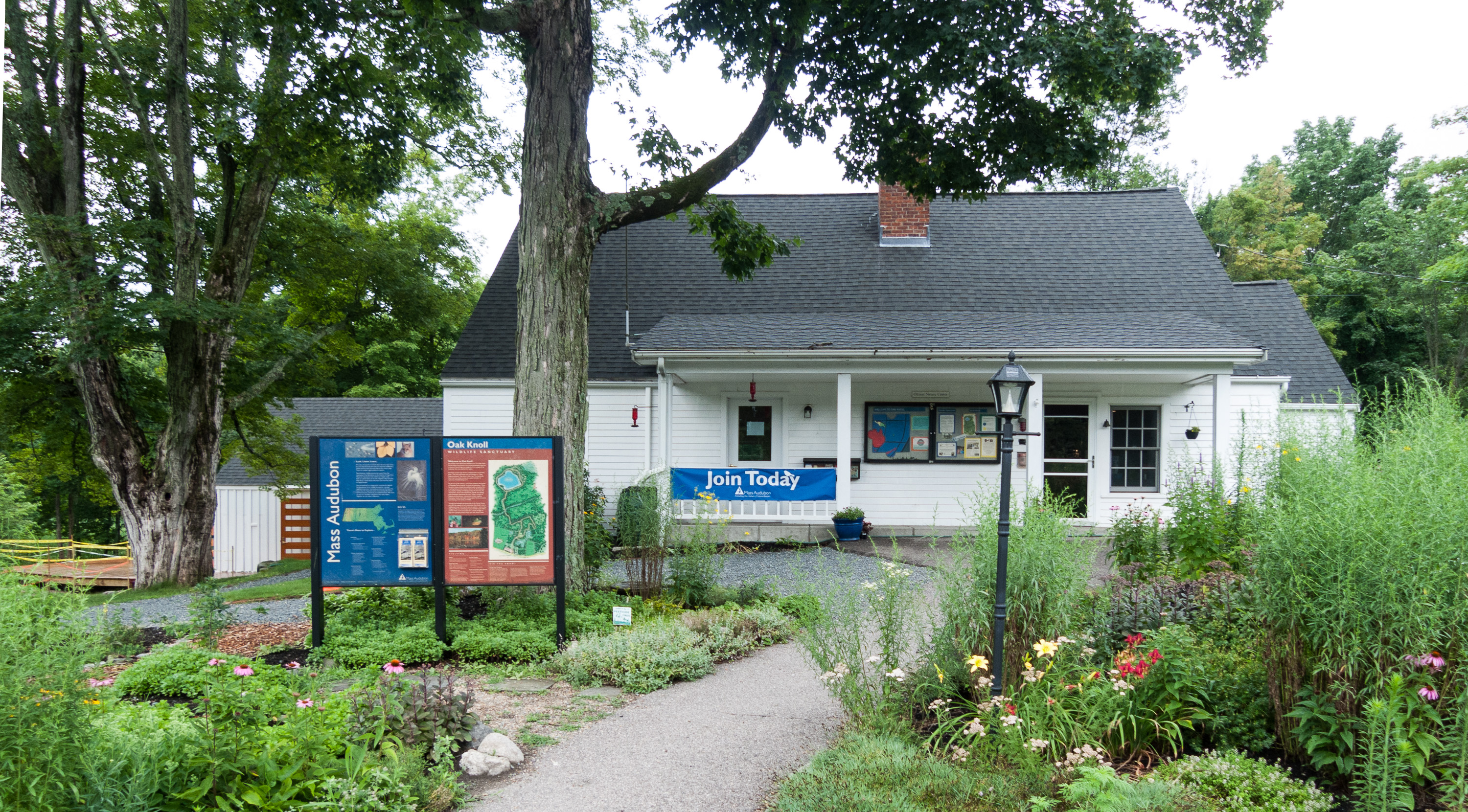
- Visitor center
- Interactive map of Oak Knoll Wildlife Sanctuary
- Type: wildlife sanctuary, nature center
- Location: 1417 Park Street; Attleboro, Massachusetts, U.S.
- Coordinates: 41°54′54″N 71°15′29″W
- Area: 75 acres (30 ha)
- Created: 1997
- Operator: Massachusetts Audubon Society
- Hiking trails: 1.5 miles
- Website: Oak Knoll Wildlife Sanctuary

Oak Knoll Wildlife Sanctuary at 1417 Park Street in Attleboro, Massachusetts, is a wildlife sanctuary of the Massachusetts Audubon Society.

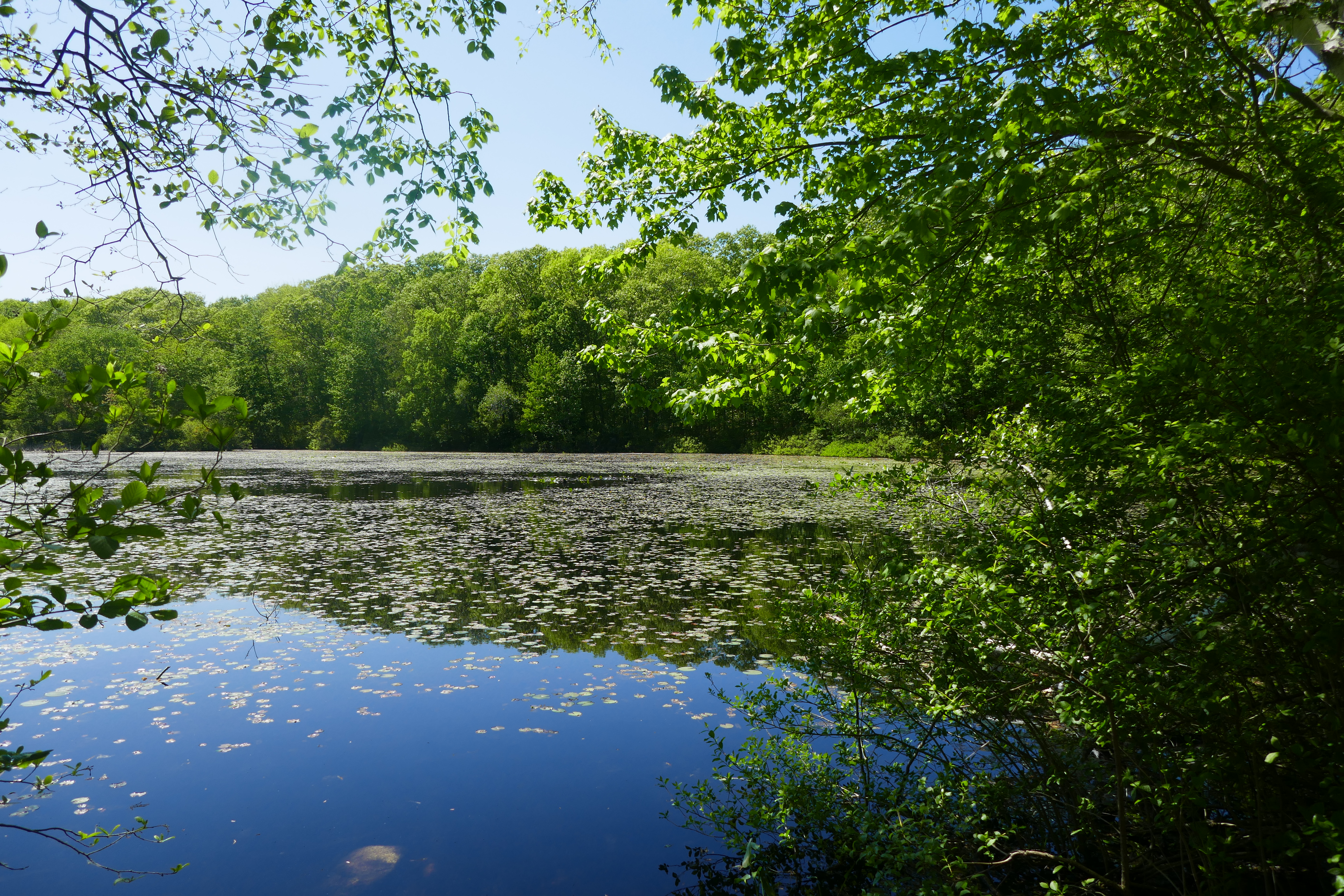
Lake Talaquega

The Sanctuary has preserved 75 acres on Lake Talaquega. The property contains a colonial house dating from 1759, which now serves as a nature center containing "[n]ative turtle species, invertebrates, and other exhibits." The land was formerly home to a casino and hotel. The Sanctuary has "wooded trails and boardwalk winding through a red maple swamp, upland forest, and freshwater marsh, and around the lake’s perimeter."
