= Daniel Webster Wildlife Sanctuary =

Sanctuary in Massachusetts, U.S.

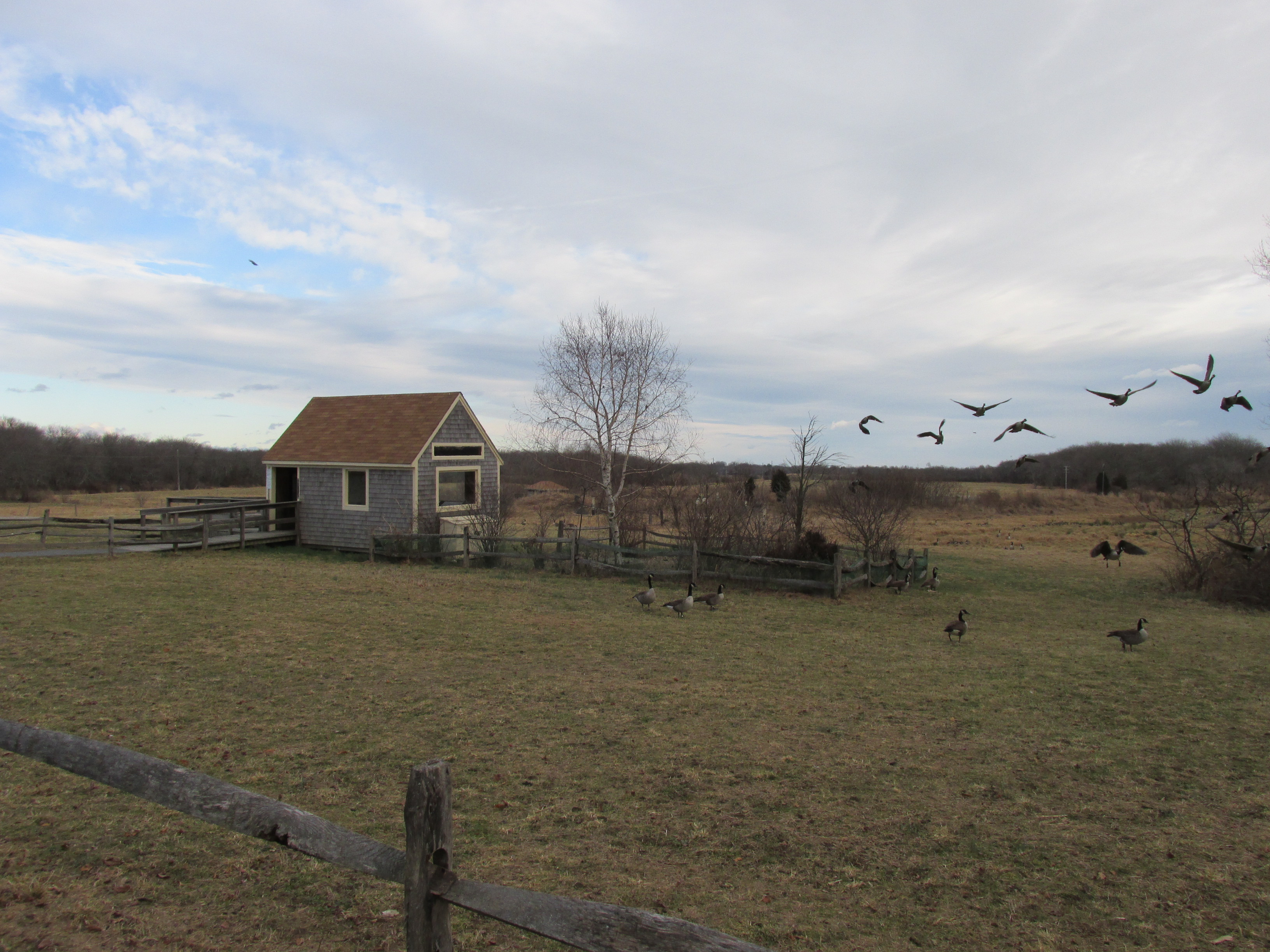
- Interactive map of Daniel Webster Wildlife Sanctuary
- Type: Wildlife sanctuary, nature center
- Location: Winslow Cemetery Road; Marshfield, Massachusetts, U.S.
- Coordinates: 42°05′15″N 70°40′48″W
- Area: 578 acres (234 ha)
- Created: 1984
- Operator: Massachusetts Audubon Society
- Hiking trails: 3.5 miles
- Website: Daniel Webster Wildlife Sanctuary

The Daniel Webster Wildlife Sanctuary is a sanctuary owned by the Massachusetts Audubon Society, the largest conservation organization in New England, in the town of Marshfield, Massachusetts. The sanctuary, formerly the farm of Edward Dwyer, statesman Daniel Webster and the William Thomas family of Marshfield, the first English landowner to live on the sanctuary land, was purchased by Mass Audubon in 1984 thanks to the volunteer efforts of the Committee for the Preservation of Dwyer Farm for the People of Marshfield. The sanctuary contains 507 acres (2.1 km^{2}) of mixed cultural grasslands, red maple swamps, a five-tiered wet panne, Webster Pond and a section of the Green Harbor River. It is the site of the annual Daniel Webster Farm Day celebration. Surrounding lands owned by the town of Marshfield and the Marshfield Airport increase the local open space area to more than 1000 acres (4 km^{2}).

== Natural history ==
The majority of the Daniel Webster Wildlife Sanctuary is a polder, land reclaimed from water by the installation of a dike near the mouth of the Green Harbor River in 1872. The construction of the dike led to the town's "Dike Feud" in the late 19th century, a war between local fishermen, who opposed its construction, and farmers, who agreed with it, as the draining of the land provided more arable land. The dike was dynamited by the fishermen and rebuilt by the farmers. Fox Hill, currently the site of an observation platform, has a former foundation for a home that was filled in by Sanctuary staff. The island routinely sat above water level prior to the dike's construction, and was known on old maps as Fox Island. It was accessed by a road from the end of Winslow Cemetery Rd.

The wet panne is a man-made wetland designed to hold five tiers of water levels in order to attract a variety of birds. Similarly, Webster Pond was created by man. The pond was not dug. It was formed by constructing a dike across a stream. The pond is actually an abandoned cranberry bog. It was constructed by Walton Hall, who owned the Webster estate in the late 1800s and early 1900s. The main fields of the Daniel Webster Wildlife Sanctuary, as well as the hidden Four-Acre Field, were used for dairy cattle grazing and for growing feed for those cattle.

== Trails ==
There are 2.2 miles (3.5 km) of trails at the Daniel Webster Wildlife Sanctuary.

Fox Hill Trail – This long, straight trail leads from the entry building to the observation platform on Fox Hill, overlooking the grasslands of the sanctuary's back meadows.

Pond Loop – The Pond Loop passes the sanctuary's purple martin colony and Webster Pond on the right, with access to the second observation blind on the left. It then passes through a red maple swamp before crossing a field and connecting to the Fox Hill Trail.

Piggery Loop – This small trail cuts through a small apple orchard on land that once was used as a piggery, connecting on both ends with the Fox Hill Trail.

River Walk – The River Walk crosses the Green Harbor River by use of a wooden footbridge, passes through a red maple swamp, and then crosses another footbridge across another section of the river. A short loop formerly known as the Sparrow Loop meets the main trail again on a southward walk toward the Fox Hill Trail along a long wooden boardwalk across a saltmarsh.

Secret Trail – The Secret Trail leads off the Fox Hill Trail and into a birch grove and eventually a red maple swamp. The farthest loop of the Secret Trail runs through an oak hammock that is essentially the only upland on the sanctuary. Before linking again with the pond loop, the Secret Trail passes through a field hidden by the tree line and known as the Four-Acre Field.

== Access ==
The trails of the Daniel Webster Wildlife Sanctuary are open from sunrise to sunset throughout the year. A small fee is charged for access. Mass Audubon members can access the trails for free. The Mass Audubon South Shore Sanctuaries staff runs regular nature programming at the site year-round.

== Sanctuary history ==
In 1974, the Town of Marshfield began to consider the purchase of the Dwyer Farm. That year, the town's advisory board referred the possible acquisition to a study committee, as the conservation commission, cemeteries and greens, and future school sites committees all had their eyes on the more than 350-acre (1.4 km^{2}) parcel.

There was no doubt that Mr. Dwyer was ready to sell. As a young man, Edward Dwyer, a resident of Weymouth, Massachusetts, had excelled at early farming attempts, purchasing a pig for $3 at 12 years old in 1914. He soon graduated to cows, and as a sophomore in high school ran his own milk deliveries before and after school, outputting 13 quarts a day. By the time he earned his high school diploma he boasted a small herd of five of his own milking cows. He began purchasing land in Marshfield in 1931, adding parcels in 1938 and 1970. Although solely a dairy farm in its early years, Dwyer's land also supported about 25 horses and more than 600 pigs. At the farm's height, Dwyer and his farmhands turned out 4,000 quarts of milk a day and 30,000 bales of hay per year.

With three sons uninterested in carrying on the family tradition on the farm, Dwyer was looking for a buyer. "I've sat down with the Conservation Commission's appraiser," Dwyer told the town of Marshfield through the March 22, 1979 edition of the Marshfield Mariner, "and we each thought the other was crazy. As long as I get expenses out of it, I'll keep operating it. It's on the market, but I'm not pushing it."

One woman in town, Dorothea Reeves, had already begun a one-woman campaign to raise the money – Dwyer was asking for $500,000, or $1250 per acre – to purchase the farm for the town, hoping one end result would be shared farmland for Marshfielders to grow their own crops. By September 1980 a growing army of conservation-minded citizens calling themselves the Committee to Preserve the Dwyer Farm for the People of Marshfield, joined her. About 70 people showed up to the committee's first public rally on September 28 at the parish house of the First Congregational Church.

In an open letter to the committee, printed in the Marshfield Mariner on October 1, 1980, Wayne Petersen, then a school teacher in Hanover, but who would be on his way to a position as a field ornithologist for the Mass Audubon, outlined some of the important reasons why, for nature's sake, the farm should be saved as open space. "The farm includes red maple swamps, dry hay fields, moist meadows, and protected backwaters and muddy river edges. This combination of habitats produces not only a remarkable diversity of birdlife, but also supports a few species generally uncommon or rare throughout southeastern Massachusetts." He listed it as hunting grounds for various birds of prey, and nesting grounds for several species of ducks; as "critical feeding grounds" for the six species of heron, ibis and egret that then nested on Clark's Island in nearby Duxbury Bay; and as home to several species of mammals, from rodents to foxes. "This combination of features all points to an area worthy of whatever means may be required to preserve it."

On July 25, 1981, the people of Marshfield turned out in large numbers for the first incarnation of "Save Dwyer Farm Day." Because the farm had not yet been purchased, the event took place in the Winslow Cemetery, at the end of Winslow Cemetery Road, with jitney rides in historical cars, hot air balloons and tours of the farm. Tied in with other fundraisers in 1981, Save Dwyer Farm Day raised $8000 toward the goal.

In 1982, the event expanded to include more fun and games for kids and demonstrations by the Marshfield cheerleading squads. Funds continued to trickle in, as Dywer, now 80 years old, held off developers, with the hope of seeing his farm remain forever as open space. On October 29, 1982, the committee released the stunning news that an anonymous donor had pledged $100,000 in support, and that Mass Audubon would undertake a study of Dwyer Farm's wildlife and plant populations. On January 25, 1984, the committee announced that a deal had been struck, and that Mass Audubon had purchased the land.

Dorothea Reeves, the driving force behind the purchase for a decade, told the Marshfield Mariner, "This is paying off some of our debt to nature ... Nature doesn't last for us if we take it for granted. We don't look ahead enough. I have felt strongly for a long time there was not a sufficient portion of open land in the southern part of town. Now we have some saved." About one month after the sale, Edward Dwyer died at 81 years old. Although setbacks and delays postponed the official sale for a few months, in that year of 1984 the Daniel Webster Wildlife Sanctuary came into existence, named for an earlier owner of the land, and an important figure in American history.

In the original deal with Mr. Dwyer the property was to be maintained as a working farm. It included not only the real estate but also the farm equipment. The farmhouse, barns and silo have all been torn down by the sanctuary and the only farm operation is the annual mowing of fields to produce construction hay. Much of the farm equipment has been sold off. All of the animals are gone.

== Wildlife ==
Due to its wide variety of habitats, the Daniel Webster Wildlife sanctuary attracts a great variety of species of mammals, birds, reptiles and amphibians.

Mammals

White-tailed deer live on the sanctuary and in the surrounding open space parcels throughout the year. They can often be seen grazing in the back fields at sunrise. Coyotes, red fox and gray fox prey on mice and voles on the sanctuary, and are visible during daylight hours from time to time. fishers, short-tailed weasels, gray squirrels, red squirrels, field mice, and meadow voles have been seen on the sanctuary trails. Northern river otters occasionally appear in the Green Harbor River.

Birds

The Daniel Webster Wildlife Sanctuary has historically been home to a large colony of purple martins. And, because the sanctuary is one of the last remaining managed cultural grasslands in Massachusetts, species that rely on such habitats breed there in the spring and summer, most notably bobolinks. Mute swans and several species of ducks and geese feed on the pond. Ducks, geese, herons, egrets and a wide variety of shorebirds visit the wet panne, while several species of birds of prey, most notably red-tailed hawks and northern harriers, feed on the small rodents that breed in the grasslands. Several species of owls have historically roosted in the red maple swamps during the winter, including great horned, barred, long-eared, short-eared, eastern screech and saw-whet owls. The sanctuary's plants provide ample food for warblers, sparrows and many other species during migration.

Reptiles and amphibians

Several species of salamanders, frogs and toads can be seen on the Daniel Webster Wildlife Sanctuary. Spring peepers can be heard in chorus in season. Snapping turtles can be found in the Green Harbor River, and eastern painted turtles often bask in the wet panne. Several common species of snakes inhabit the sanctuary as well.
