= Stony Brook Wildlife Sanctuary =

Wildlife sanctuary in Norfolk, Massachusetts

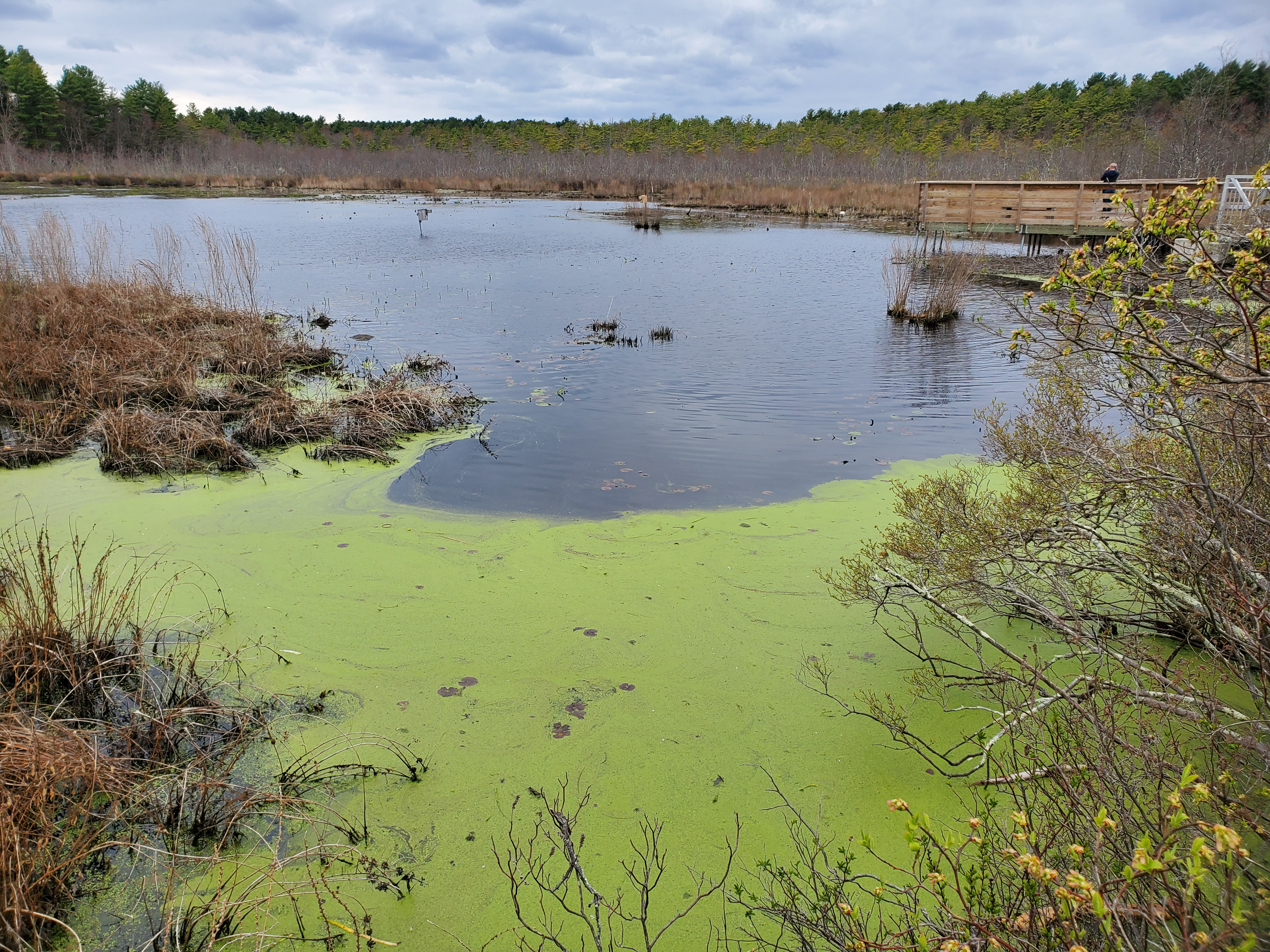
- Interactive map of Stony Brook Wildlife Sanctuary
- Type: wildlife sanctuary, nature center
- Location: 108 North Street; Norfolk, Massachusetts, U.S.
- Coordinates: 42°6′28″N 71°19′11″W
- Area: 107 acres (43 ha)
- Created: 1963
- Operator: Massachusetts Audubon Society
- Hiking trails: 2 miles
- Website: Stony Brook Wildlife Sanctuary

Stony Brook Wildlife Sanctuary is a wildlife sanctuary in Norfolk, Massachusetts. The 107-acre sanctuary, owned by the Massachusetts Audubon Society, is adjacent to the 140-acre Bristol Blake State Reservation. The two areas are "cooperatively managed" by Mass Audubon and the Department of Conservation and Recreation (DCR).

A 1 mile (1.6 km) trail encircles Stony Brook Pond, ending by a waterfall at the site of a former mill. The trail is wheelchair accessible and includes a 525-foot long boardwalk, installed in 2017, that allows visitors to view birds, wildlife, and the wetland habitat over Teal Marsh and Kingfisher Pond. Wildlife found there includes turtles, ducks, geese, great blue herons, and muskrats. The sanctuary also has natural history exhibits, programming space, a gift shop, nature play area, a picnic area, and a butterfly garden.

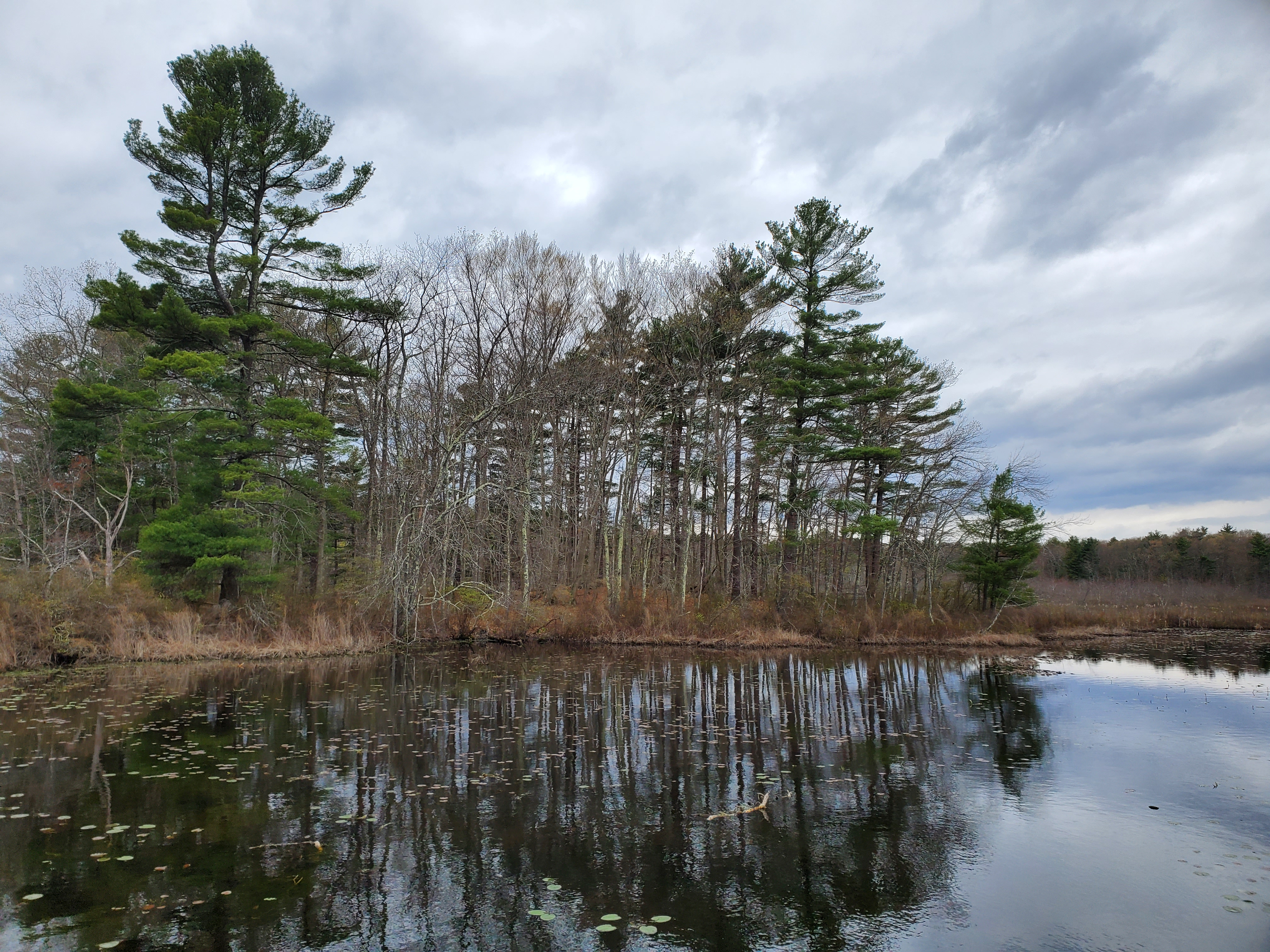
Kingfisher Pond in Stony Brook Wildlife Sanctuary in Norfolk, Massachusetts
