= Massachusetts Audubon Society =

US nonprofit environmental organization

Mass Audubon
- Massachusetts Audubon Society

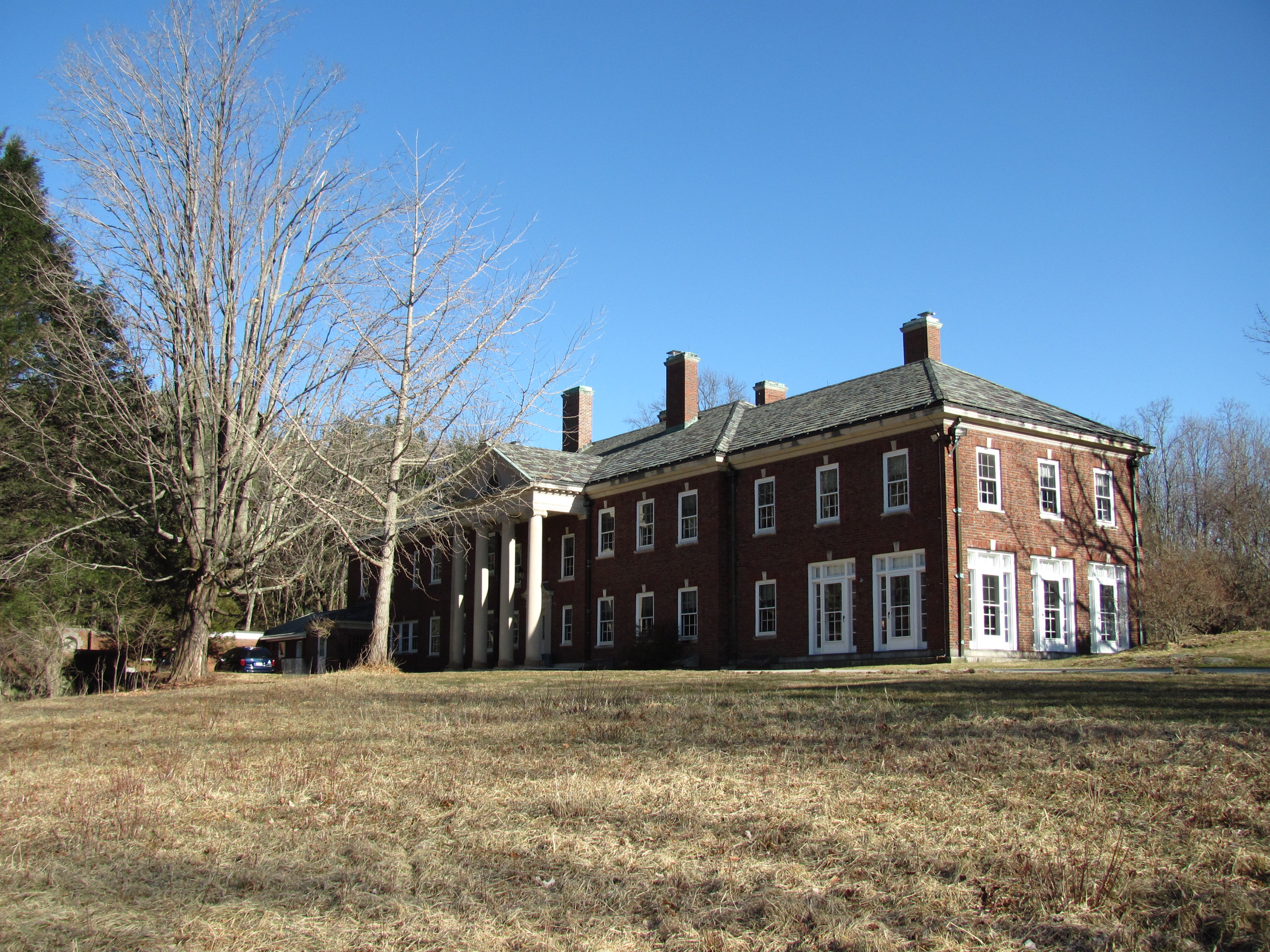
- The society's headquarters, Gordon Hall at Drumlin Farm Wildlife Sanctuary in Lincoln
- Formation: 1896; 130 years ago
- Founder: Harriet Hemenway and Minna B. Hall
- Type: Nonprofit
- Tax ID no.: 04-2104702
- Legal status: 501(c)(3)
- Purpose: Protecting the nature of Massachusetts
- Headquarters: Drumlin Farm, Lincoln, Massachusetts
- Coordinates: 42.409866°N 71.331850°W
- Region served: Massachusetts
- Board Chair: Beth Kressley Goldstein
- President: David O'Neill
- Main organ: Board of Directors
- Website: www.massaudubon.org

The Massachusetts Audubon Society, commonly known as Mass Audubon, founded in 1896 by Harriet Hemenway and Minna B. Hall and headquartered in Lincoln, Massachusetts, is a nonprofit organization dedicated to "protecting the nature of Massachusetts". Mass Audubon is independent of the National Audubon Society (NAS), and was founded earlier than the NAS. Mass Audubon protects more than 40,000 acres of land throughout Massachusetts, saving birds and other wildlife, and making nature accessible to all with its wildlife sanctuaries and 20 nature centers.

== History ==
The Massachusetts Audubon Society was born out of Harriet Hemenway's desire to stop the commercial slaughter of birds for women's ornamental hats. Hemenway and her cousin, Minna Hall, soon enlisted 900 women and formed a partnership with many from Boston's scientific community to form their organization. They named the organization the Massachusetts Audubon Society in honor of the bird painter John James Audubon. In 1905, a national committee of Audubon societies was developed. This committee was vital in passing the Migratory Bird Conservation Act in 1913 and the Migratory Bird Treaty Act of 1918 with Great Britain. The passage of these measures effectively eliminated the commercial plume trade.

Mass Audubon's first wildlife sanctuary, Moose Hill Wildlife Sanctuary in Sharon, Massachusetts, dates back to 1916 when the board accepts an offer of Sharon resident George Field to use his property as a bird sanctuary. Mass Audubon purchased the parcel in 1922.

== Wildlife sanctuaries ==
Mass Audubon's statewide network of more than 100 wildlife sanctuaries welcomes visitors of all ages and is a home for more than 150 endangered and threatened native species. Some of the sanctuaries, as noted below, have staffed nature centers or museums.

For information about properties without a Wikipedia page, visit the Mass Audubon website's list of wildlife sanctuaries and select the property.

Name	Town	County	Location	Acreage	Open to public	Description	Photos
Allens Pond Wildlife Sanctuary	Westport	Bristol	41.50722°N 71.02644°W	620 acres (250 ha)	Yes	With nature center	
Arcadia Wildlife Sanctuary	Easthampton	Hampshire	42.28972°N 72.64817°W	734 acres (297 ha)	Yes	With nature center	
Ashumet Holly Wildlife Sanctuary	East Falmouth	Barnstable	41.62066°N 70.53922°W	45 acres (18 ha)	Yes		
Attleboro Springs Wildlife Sanctuary	Attleboro	Bristol	41.92882°N 71.26570°W	117 acres (47 ha)	Yes		
Barnstable Great Marsh Wildlife Sanctuary	Barnstable	Barnstable	41.70158°N 70.32732°W	113 acres (46 ha)	Yes		
Blue Hills Trailside Museum	Milton	Norfolk	42.21847°N 71.12129°W		Yes	small museum, outdoor exhibit area and event facility within the 7,000-acre (2,800 ha) Blue Hills Reservation	
Boston Nature Center	Mattapan	Suffolk	42.28810°N 71.10378°W	67 acres (27 ha)	Yes	With nature center and event facility	
Brewster's Woods Wildlife Sanctuary	Concord	Middlesex	42.16331°N 71.14503°W	130 acres (53 ha)	Yes		
Broad Hill Wildlife Sanctuary	Holliston	Middlesex	42.22266°N 71.45296°W	185 acres (75 ha)	Yes		
Broad Meadow Brook Conservation Center and Wildlife Sanctuary	Worcester	Worcester	42.23308°N 71.76696°W	435 acres (176 ha)	Yes	With nature center and event facility	
Broadmoor Wildlife Sanctuary	Natick	Middlesex	42.25611°N 71.34297°W	624 acres (253 ha)	Yes	With nature center and event facility	
Burncoat Pond Wildlife Sanctuary	Spencer	Worcester	42.23835°N 71.96355°W	245 acres (99 ha)	Yes		
Canoe Meadows Wildlife Sanctuary	Pittsfield	Berkshire	42.43053°N 73.23748°W	253 acres (102 ha)	Yes		
Cedar Pond Wildlife Sanctuary	Wenham	Essex	42.604628°N 70.905928°W	158 acres (64 ha)	Yes		
Chelsea Creek Sanctuary	Chelsea	Suffolk	42.4005136°N 71.0114416°W	15 acres (6.1 ha)	No	Proposed	
Cheshire Pond Wildlife Sanctuary	Ashburnham	Worcester	42.632389°N 71.954794°W	414 acres (168 ha)	No		
Cold Brook Wildlife Sanctuary	Sandisfield	Berkshire	42.160548°N 73.083247°W	770 acres (310 ha)	No	"Planning is now underway for the removal of buildings in disrepair at the home site, the creation of trails for passive recreation, and a parking area nearby."	
Conway Hills Wildlife Sanctuary	Conway	Franklin	42.50888°N 72.68205°W	105 acres (42 ha)	Yes		
Cook’s Canyon Wildlife Sanctuary	Barre	Worcester	42.41792°N 72.10589°W	69 acres (28 ha)	Yes		
Daniel Webster Wildlife Sanctuary	Marshfield	Plymouth	42.28937°N 71.42105°W	507 acres (205 ha)	Yes		
Drumlin Farm Wildlife Sanctuary	Lincoln	Middlesex	42.40898°N 71.33176°W	291 acres (118 ha)	Yes	With farm exhibit buildings, nature center, and event facility	
Eagle Lake Wildlife Sanctuary	Holden	Worcester	42.35783°N 71.89625°W	369 acres (149 ha)	Yes		
Eastern Point Wildlife Sanctuary	Gloucester	Essex	42.58130°N 70.66429°W	51 acres (21 ha)	Yes		
Endicott Wildlife Sanctuary	Wenham	Essex	42.58171°N 70.81822°W	43 acres (17 ha)	Yes		
Felix Neck Wildlife Sanctuary	Edgartown	Dukes	41.41356°N 70.56614°W	194 acres (79 ha)	Yes	With nature center	
Flat Rock Wildlife Sanctuary	Fitchburg	Worcester	42.5991°N 71.80516°W	326 acres (132 ha)	Yes		
Graves Farm Wildlife Sanctuary	Williamsburg	Hampshire	42.40185°N 72.70491°W	633 acres (256 ha)	Yes		
Great Neck Wildlife Sanctuary	Wareham	Plymouth	41.72515°N 70.66256°W	219 acres (89 ha)	Yes		
Habitat Education Center and Wildlife Sanctuary	Belmont	Middlesex	42.40262°N 71.18723°W	88 acres (36 ha)	Yes	With nature center and event facility	
High Ledges Wildlife Sanctuary	Shelburne	Franklin	42.62007°N 72.70820°W	855 acres (346 ha)	Yes		
Ipswich River Wildlife Sanctuary	Topsfield	Essex	42.63154°N 70.92316°W	1955 acres (791 ha)	Yes	With nature center	
Joppa Flats Education Center	Newburyport	Essex	42.79918°N 70.84952°W	52 acres (21 ha)	Yes	With nature center	
Kettle Island Wildlife Sanctuary	Manchester-by-the Sea	Essex	42.56947°N 70.71913°W	17 acres (6.9 ha)	No	Landing on the island is prohibited	
Lake Wampanoag Wildlife Sanctuary	Gardner	Worcester	42.61113°N 71.96662°W	377 acres (153 ha)	Yes		
Laughing Brook Wildlife Sanctuary	Hampden	Hampden	42.06471°N 72.40695°W	374 acres (151 ha)	Yes		
Lime Kiln Farm Wildlife Sanctuary	Sheffield	Berkshire	42.08260°N 73.36274°W	363 acres (147 ha)	Yes		
Lincoln Woods Wildlife Sanctuary	Leominster	Worcester	42.51456°N 71.76125°W	63 acres (25 ha)	Yes		
Long Pasture Wildlife Sanctuary	Barnstable	Barnstable	41.70912°N 70.27759°W	101 acres (41 ha)	Yes	With nature center and event facility	
Lost Farm Wildlife Sanctuary	Nantucket	Nantucket	41.26306°N 70.13703°W	75 acres (30 ha)	Yes		
Lynes Woods Wildlife Sanctuary	Westhampton	Hampshire	42.27428°N 72.775394°W	188 acres (76 ha)	Yes		
Magazine Beach Park Nature Center	Cambridge	Middlesex	42.35564°N 71.11440°W		Yes	Nature center within the Charles River Reservation	
Marblehead Neck Wildlife Sanctuary	Marblehead	Essex	42.49300°N 70.84318°W	20 acres (8.1 ha)	Yes		
Moose Hill Wildlife Sanctuary	Sharon	Norfolk	42.12376°N 71.21060°W	1971 acres (798 ha)	Yes	With nature center and event facility	
Museum of American Bird Art Education Center & Wildlife Sanctuary	Canton	Norfolk	42.16330°N 71.14501°W	121 acres (49 ha)	Yes	Gallery closed as of July 2023	
Nahant Thicket Wildlife Sanctuary	Nahant	Essex	42.42218°N 70.91307°W	4 acres (1.6 ha)	Yes		
Nashoba Brook Wildlife Sanctuary	Westford	Middlesex	42.55152°N 71.43495°W	420 acres (170 ha)	Yes		
North Hill Marsh Wildlife Sanctuary	Duxbury	Plymouth	42.04033°N 70.71333°W	146 acres (59 ha)	Yes		
North River Wildlife Sanctuary	Marshfield	Plymouth	42.15440°N 70.74552°W	225 acres (91 ha)	Yes	With nature center	
Norwood Mills Wildlife Sanctuary	Rockport	Essex	42.6808376°N 70.632385°W	147 acres (59 ha)	Yes		
Oak Knoll Wildlife Sanctuary	Attleboro	Bristol	41.91498°N 71.26825°W	75 acres (30 ha)	Yes	With nature center	
Old Baldy Wildlife Sanctuary	Otis	Berkshire	42.17285°N 73.06109°W	154 acres (62 ha)	Yes		
Palmer Brook Wildlife Sanctuary	Becket	Berkshire	42.28151°N 73.116728°W	850 acres (340 ha)	No	Under development	
Pawtucket Farm Wildlife Sanctuary	Lowell	Middlesex	42.650959°N 71.3766860°W	20 acres (8.1 ha)	Yes	Opened in 2024	
Pierpont Meadow Wildlife Sanctuary	Dudley	Worcester	42.08111°N 71.90791°W	211 acres (85 ha)	Yes		
Pleasant Valley Wildlife Sanctuary	Lenox	Berkshire	42.38438°N 73.30165°W	1405 acres (569 ha)	Yes	With nature center	
Poor Farm Hill Wildlife Sanctuary	New Salem	Franklin	42.50290°N 72.33948°W	53 acres (21 ha)	Yes		
Richardson Brook Wildlife Sanctuary	Tolland	Hampden	42.08744°N 73.05330°W	109 acres (44 ha)	Yes		
Road's End Wildlife Sanctuary	Worthington	Hampshire	42.42374°N 72.93018°W	190 acres (77 ha)	Yes		
Rocky Hill Wildlife Sanctuary	Groton	Middlesex	42.58105°N 71.53364°W	441 acres (178 ha)	Yes		
Rough Meadows Wildlife Sanctuary	Rowley	Essex	42.74384°N 70.84974°W	226 acres (91 ha)	Yes		
Rutland Brook Wildlife Sanctuary	Petersham	Worcester	42.46320°N 72.16370°W	1779 acres (720 ha)	Yes		
Sampsons Island Wildlife Sanctuary	Barnstable	Barnstable	41.60645°N 70.42940°W	37 acres (15 ha)	Yes	Much of the island is closed to visitors in spring and summer to protect nesting birds.	
Sesachacha Heathlands Wildlife Sanctuary	Nantucket	Nantucket	41.28372°N 69.98035°W	875 acres (354 ha)	Yes		
Skunknett River Wildlife Sanctuary	Barnstable	Barnstable	41.64323°N 70.37675°W	147 acres (59 ha)	Yes		
Stony Brook Wildlife Sanctuary	Norfolk	Norfolk	42.10785°N 71.32004°W	107 acres (43 ha)	Yes	With nature center	
Straitsmouth Island Wildlife Sanctuary	Rockport	Essex	42.66152°N 70.59124°W	32 acres (13 ha)	Yes	Open May 15 to August 30, accessible only by kayak.	
Tidmarsh Wildlife Sanctuary	Plymouth	Plymouth	41.91673°N 70.57531°W	481 acres (195 ha)	Yes		
Tracy Brook Wildlife Sanctuary	Richmond	Berkshire	42.41317°N 73.31304°W	21 acres (8.5 ha)	No	No trails; observe heron rookery from road pull-off.	
Wachusett Meadow Wildlife Sanctuary	Princeton	Worcester	42.45572°N 71.90813°W	1135 acres (459 ha)	Yes	With nature center and event facility	
Waseeka Wildlife Sanctuary	Hopkinton	Middlesex	42.21636°N 71.46682°W	229 acres (93 ha)	Yes		
Wellfleet Bay Wildlife Sanctuary	Wellfleet	Barnstable	41.88242°N 69.99775°W	1183 acres (479 ha)	Yes	With nature center	
West Mountain Wildlife Sanctuary	Plainfield	Hampshire	42.51720°N 72.94508°W	1812 acres (733 ha)	Yes		

== Camp Wildwood ==
Camp Wildwood, established in 1950, is the Society's only overnight summer camp, and it is accredited by the American Camp Association. The 159 acre camp is located in Rindge, New Hampshire, on Hubbard Pond, bordering 1,494-acre Annett State Forest. The property includes a central shower house, arts and crafts center, 135-seat dining hall, health center, office, camp store, seven cabin sites, an archery range, high and low ropes challenge course, playing field, and several trails and areas of forest and wetland for exploration.

During the summers, Camp Wildwood hosts campers ranging from ages 7 to 17. The programs at the camp include a day camp, a three-day session for campers 7 to 8 years old, one- and two-week sessions for campers ages 9 to 16, one- and two-week off-site Treks for campers ages 14–17, and a several-week long Leadership program (called LIT/LIA, meaning Leaders in Training and Leaders in Action) for campers ages 16 and 17. The camp also hosts several three-day long "Family Camp" sessions throughout the summer for all ages.

Camp Wildwood was previously located on Lake Wampanoag in Gardner, Massachusetts. It moved to its current location in 2003. The current site was previously a boy scout camp, Camp Quinapoxet.
