= North River Wildlife Sanctuary =

Nature reserve in Massachusetts, US

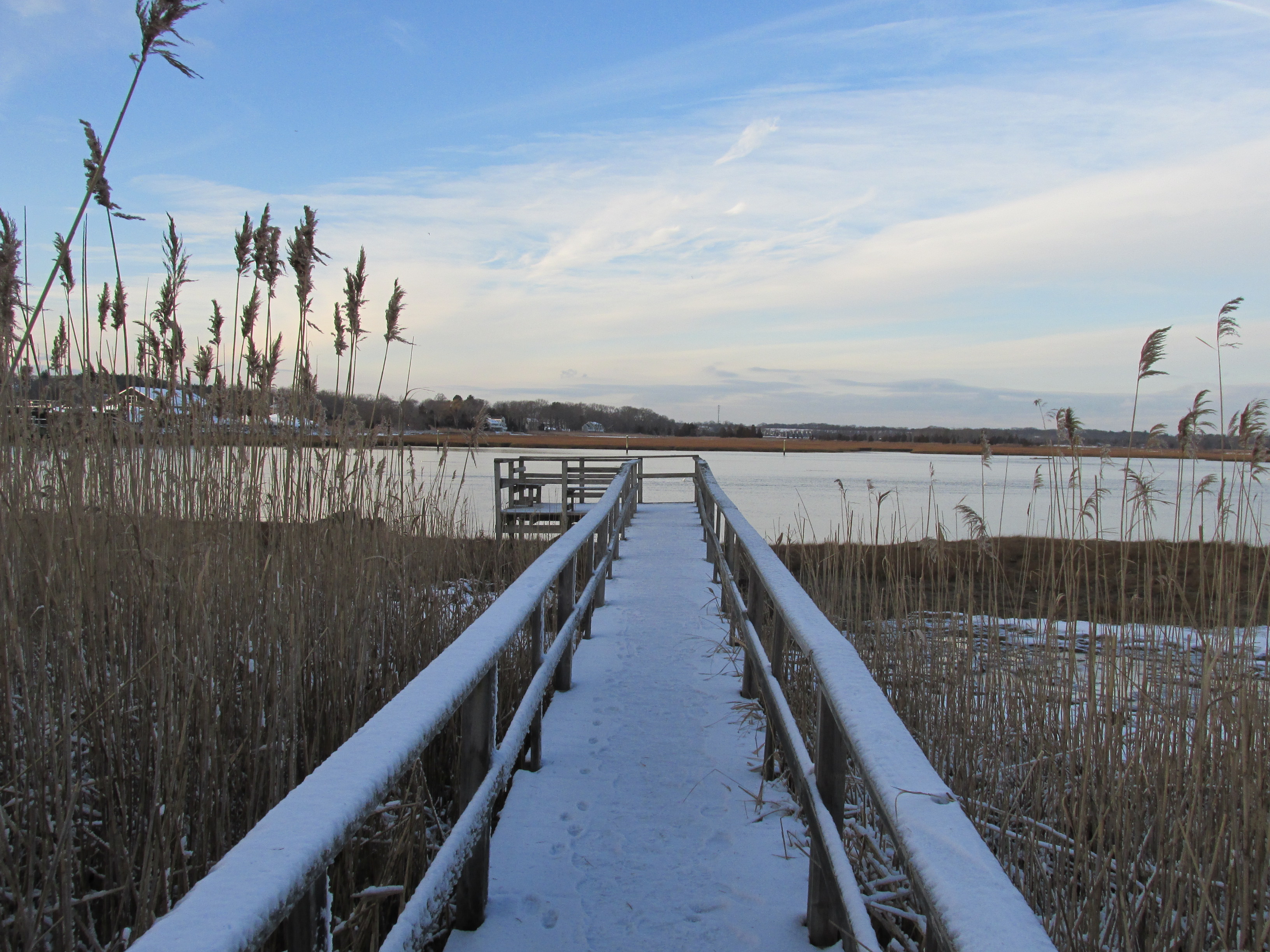
- Interactive map of North River Wildlife Sanctuary
- Type: wildlife sanctuary, nature center
- Location: 2000 Main Street; Marshfield, Massachusetts, U.S.
- Coordinates: 42°9′14″N 70°44′35″W
- Area: 225 acres (91 ha)
- Created: 1977
- Operator: Massachusetts Audubon Society
- Hiking trails: 2 miles
- Website: North River Wildlife Sanctuary

The North River Wildlife Sanctuary is a wildlife sanctuary, owned by the Massachusetts Audubon Society, located on the North River in the town of Marshfield, Massachusetts. The sanctuary contains 184 acres (0.74 km^{2}) of mixed cultural grasslands, red maple swamps, oak–pine woodland, and access to the river. The North River Wildlife Sanctuary came to Mass Audubon as a gift of the Killam and Rodgers families in 1977.

== Natural history ==
The North River Wildlife sanctuary has two major sections, marked by the Woodland Loop trails and the River Loop trails.

The dominant trees of the Woodland Loop are members of the black oak family, towering white pines and American beech. The under story has American holly, highbush blueberry, sweet pepperbush and, along the Hannah Eames Brook, American hornbeam or “musclewood” trees. In warmer weather approximately fifteen species of ferns can be seen along the Woodland Loop. There is a witch-hazel grove at the intersection of the Woodland Loop and the Hannah Eames Brook Trail.

The open field of the River Loop trail system sloping down to the North River valley is managed as a hayfield, as it was during prior centuries. This ecological management plan is keeping this cultural grassland, a vanishing habitat in the east, open in Massachusetts. The red maple swamp off the main field shows signs of use during the North River's shipbuilding heyday (1690–1870), specifically multiple mature shoots sprouting from a single ancient tree trunk. Early shipbuilders found the combination of easy access to the sea, thick virgin forests and access to iron ore in bogs upriver as advantageous for their needs.

A confined growth of small trees at the top of the open field stands where a barn once stood, representative of the successional growth that would take place throughout the field if it were not managed as it currently is.

The lower loop of the River Loop winds through wetlands that include skunk cabbage and several species of ferns before emerging onto the platform above the saltmarsh grasses of the North River basin.

== Trails ==
There are more than a mile of trails at the North River Wildlife Sanctuary.

Woodland Loop – The longest of the trails on the North River Wildlife Sanctuary, the Woodland Loop winds through an oak-pine forest of the type routinely found in the northeastern section of the United States. A spur trail, the Hannah Eames Brook Trail, leads off the Woodland Loop.

Hannah Eames Brook Trail – This short trail leads directly from the Woodland Loop to the banks of Hannah Eames Brook, ending on a wooden boardwalk.

River Loop – The River Loop circles a stonewall-encircled grassland, sloping down into the North River valley. Two smaller trails, the Red Maple Loop and an unnamed extension of the River Loop, lead off the main trail. The extension leads to a platform overlooking the North River.

Red Maple Loop – This short trail branches off and reconnects to the River Loop, traveling through a red maple swamp.

== Access ==
The trails of the North River Wildlife Sanctuary are open from sunrise to sunset throughout the year. A small fee is charged for access. Mass Audubon members can access the trails for free. The Mass Audubon South Shore Sanctuaries staff runs regular nature programming at the site year round.

== History ==
The North River and its valley provided an important travel route, agricultural area and shipbuilding center well into the late 19th century. The river basin was used by Native Americans and then by colonists as the area was settled by Europeans during the 17th century. The land that makes up the North River Wildlife Sanctuary changed hands many times during the first three centuries of settlement.

Settler Amos Rogers received a land grant in 1702 that included the Riverside Farm site. He married Rachel Wales, the daughter of the Rev. Atherton Wales, in 1737. They had a daughter, Rachel Rogers, in 1738, and later a son, Atherton Wales Rogers.

Rachel married Captain George Little in 1779. Captain Little purchased land from his father-in-law, Amos Rogers, which included the Clift Farm of 80 acres (320,000 m^{2}), for 110 pounds. Little may have built the mansion house that was located north of the present Mass Audubon nature center. Their only child, Edward Preble Little, was born in 1775. The Rogers family had a boat yard near the river crossing in the late 18th century. In 1811, Edward Preble Little married Edy Rogers, and later married Beulah Brown of Lynn, Massachusetts in 1824. Between 1824 and 1905, the land passed from the Rogers family to Edward T. Loring of East Boston, Massachusetts, Oren A. Durrell of Lynn, Massachusetts, Benjamin E. Wright, and Enos M. Stoddard, owner of the Boston Ice Company

In 1905, upon the death of Stoddard, the estate, which by then included 180 acres (0.73 km^{2}), a cottage near the river's edge, and a barn, was left to his son Charles Dudley Stoddard. That year, Charles married the widow Arabella Cann Killam of Nova Scotia. Charles remained a gentleman farmer in North Marshfield. Arabella's two daughters, Elizabeth and Constance, moved into the main house with their mother and stepfather, while her son, Izaak, remained in Nova Scotia.

In 1914 or 1915, Elizabeth (Betty) Killam married Ralph Rodgers of Marshfield. (Rodgers was from a local family that spelled the name without the “d”; it appears that he chose to change the spelling). In 1915, the cottage was moved from the river's edge near the North River Bridge to its present location perpendicular to the main house. Betty and Ralph then moved into the cottage. They had one son, Walton. The cottage served as a residence for about twenty-five years. In 1926, Ralph Rodgers died in a flu epidemic. Betty and her son remained in the cottage.

In 1923, the main house, now the nature center of the North River Wildlife Sanctuary, and the cottage were renovated to their present configurations. Charles Stoddard died in 1933, leaving the house to his wife. When she died in 1937, she left the estate to her three children. Izaak died in 1955, Betty in 1975, and Constance in 1977. Their will left the house and grounds, with some funds for an endowment, to Mass Audubon.

When Mass Audubon assumed ownership of the estate in 1980, the barn, which was across Summer Street from the main house, was moved to a spot in the woods behind the house and refurbished to accommodate Mass Audubon's goals and activities. Driveway construction, site work and building restoration took two years to complete. The main house now serves as the administration and management headquarters for the Mass Audubon South Shore Sanctuaries’ educational and advocacy activities on the South Shore of Boston, housing offices, a library, a program room and gift shop.

== Wildlife ==
Due to its wide variety of habitats, the North River Wildlife Sanctuary attracts a great variety of species of mammals, birds, reptiles and amphibians.

=== Mammals ===
White-tailed deer live on the sanctuary throughout the year. Eastern coyotes, fishers, woodchucks, gray squirrels, red squirrels, chipmunks, field mice, and meadow voles have been seen on the sanctuary trails. Harbor seals are regularly seen in the North River.

=== Birds ===
Thanks to its proximity to the Atlantic Ocean, the North River Wildlife Sanctuary offers a wide variety of bird sightings. Along the river's edge, several species of gulls can be seen in season, including great black-backed, herring, ring-billed and Bonaparte's gulls. Egrets and herons feed in the marshy edges of the river. Red-tailed hawks hunt in the open field, while sharp-shinned and Cooper's hawks prey on the smaller birds that inhabit the area. A wide variety of birds breed on the property, including American woodcocks, red-bellied woodpeckers, tree swallows, eastern phoebes, Baltimore orioles, scarlet tanagers, eastern towhees, and more. Historically, a purple martin colony has nested in the open field.

=== Reptiles and amphibians ===
Several species of salamanders, frogs and toads can be seen on the North River Wildlife Sanctuary. Spring peepers can be heard in chorus in season. Various species of snakes can be seen in the grasslands and on the Woodland Loop.
