= Maurice C. Gregory =

U.S. Marine Corps Brigadier General

Maurice Clinton Gregory
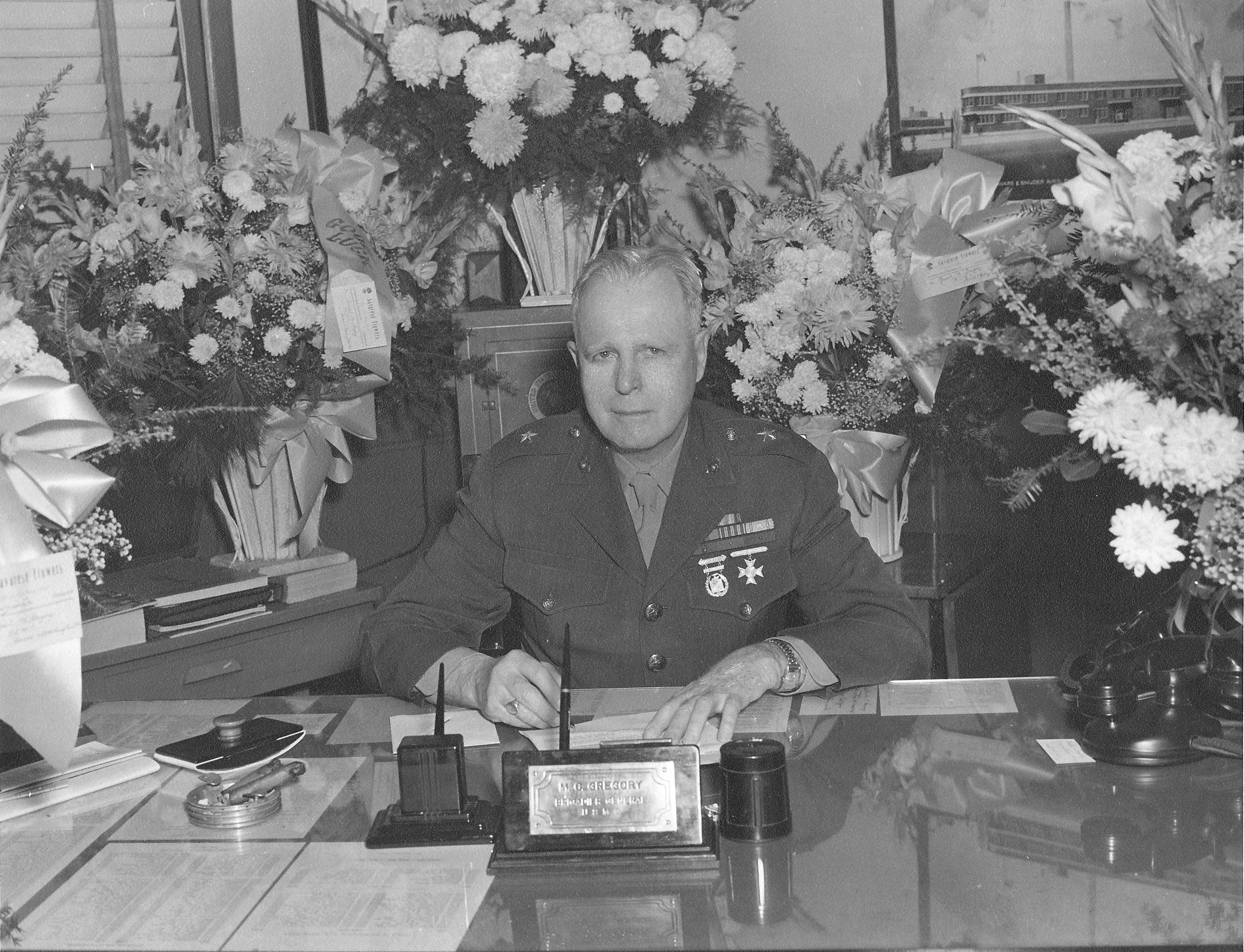
- BG Maurice C. Gregory, USMC
- Born: October 9, 1881; Cresco, Iowa, US
- Died: October 27, 1949 (aged 68); Philadelphia, Pennsylvania, US
- Burial place: Arlington National Cemetery
- Military career
- Allegiance: United States
- Branch: United States Marine Corps
- Service years: 1905–1945
- Rank: Brigadier general
- Service number: 0-356
- Commands: Depot of Supplies, Philadelphia
- Conflicts: World War I Nicaraguan Campaign; World War II
- Awards: Legion of Merit

Maurice Clinton Gregory (October 9, 1881 – October 27, 1949) was a decorated mustang officer of the United States Marine Corps with the rank of brigadier general. He spent his career mostly in Quartermaster Department of the Marine Corps beginning as private in the field assignments, ultimately reaching the general's rank and command of Depot of Supplies, Philadelphia during World War II.

== Early career ==
Gregory was born on October 9, 1881, in Cresco, Iowa, and, following high school, he enlisted in the Marine Corps as a private on February 23, 1905. He attended the boot camp and subsequently served as enlisted man for twelve years. Gregory reached the rank of Quartermaster's Clerk (equivalent to Marine Gunner's rank) and received together four Marine Corps Good Conduct Medals for exemplary behavior and efficiency during his enlisted service. He also saw service in the Philippines in the prewar period.

He was commissioned second lieutenant on June 14, 1917, and ordered to Marine Barracks Parris Island, South Carolina for duty as Depot Quartermaster with temporary rank of captain. Following the war, Gregory was reverted to second lieutenant and ordered to Nicaragua for duty as post quartermaster with Marine detachment, Legation Guard at Managua in October 1920. Gregory was successively promoted to the ranks of first lieutenant and captain while in Nicaragua and returned to the United States in June 1922.

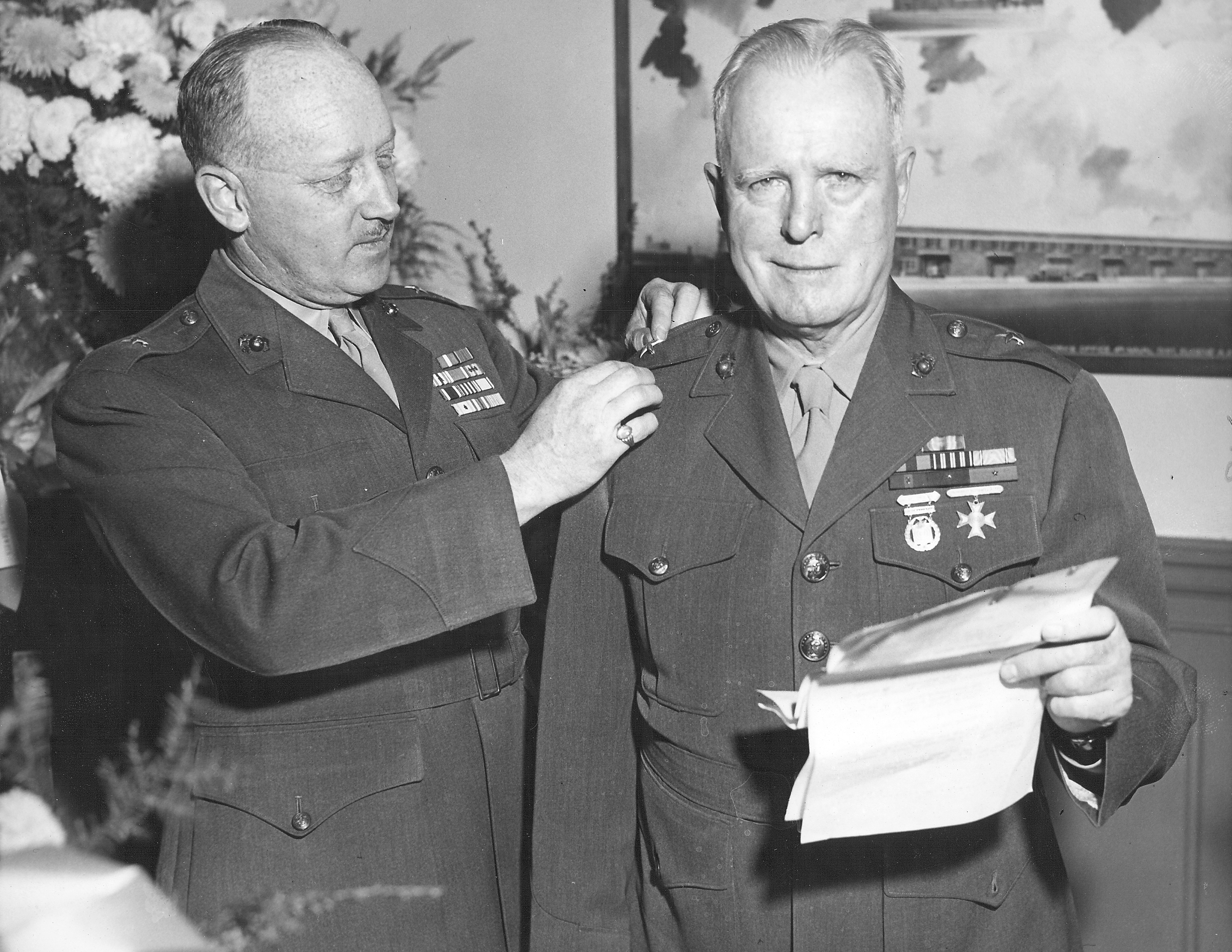
BG Leonard E. Rea (executive officer of the Quartermaster Department) promotes Maurice C. Gregory to the rank of Brigadier general, November 1944.

Following his return, Gregory was ordered to the Marine Corps Schools, Quantico for Company Officers Course, which he completed one year later. He subsequently served at Quantico until September 1925, when he was attached to the Recruiting station in Omaha, Nebraska. Gregory was ordered to Chicago, Illinois, in August 1926 for instruction at the Army Quartermaster Subsistence School, which he completed one year later.

Gregory then arrived to Marine Corps Base San Diego in June 1927 and served as post quartermaster until December 1928, when he sailed for his second tour of expeditionary duty in Nicaragua. He was attached to the Second Marine Brigade under Brigadier General Logan Feland and served as assistant to the brigade quartermaster until he was transferred as quartermaster to Guardia Nacional de Nicaragua. While in this capacity, he aided in relief work in connection with the earthquake at Managua in March 1931 and was commended by the secretary of the Navy and the Red cross. He received Nicaraguan Presidential Order of Merit with Gold star and also Medal of Merit with silver star for his service in Nicaragua.

Upon his return to the United States in June 1931, he was ordered to the Field Officer's Course at Marine Corps Schools, Quantico and graduated one year later. Gregory then served as post quartermaster at Quantico until July 1934 and was promoted to major in May of that year. He was subsequently transferred to the Marine Corps Base San Diego and served again as post quartermaster until June 1940. Meanwhile, he was promoted to the rank of lieutenant colonel in June 1938.

== World War II ==
Gregory was promoted to the rank of colonel in January 1940 and transferred to Depot of Supplies, Philadelphia in July of that year. He served as Depot Commanding officer for the duration of the war and was promoted to the rank of brigadier general in December 1944. His depot served as Headquarters of Quartermaster Generals of the Marine Corps, Seth Williams and William P. T. Hill consecutively and served to procure, store, maintain, distribute and manufacture uniforms and minor equipage.

Assembly line production of military hardware and housekeeping supplies included hat ornaments, mosquito nets, mess pans, helmets, articles of uniforms, foot lockers, buckets, stoves, tent poles, bunks, etc. General Gregory oversaw 6,000 employees and marines and Depot received Army-Navy "E" Award for production efficiency in 1943. Gregory himself received the Legion of Merit for his service at Depot of Supplies, Philadelphia.

He retired on September 1, 1945, by reason of pending retirement and settled in Philadelphia with his wife Mae Agnes Gregory. Brigadier General Maurice C. Gregory died on October 27, 1949, and is buried at Arlington National Cemetery in Virginia. They had together two sons: Noel, who served as major in the Marine Corps Reserve, and Marshall, who was graduate of the Naval Academy and retired as colonel.

== Decorations ==
Here is the ribbon bar of Brigadier General Maurice C. Gregory:

1st Row	Legion of Merit		
2nd Row	Marine Corps Good Conduct Medal with three stars	World War I Victory Medal	Marine Corps Expeditionary Medal
3rd Row	Second Nicaraguan Campaign Medal	American Defense Service Medal	American Campaign Medal
4th Row	World War II Victory Medal	Nicaraguan Presidential Order of Merit with Gold star	Nicaraguan Medal of Merit with silver star
