= Bennet Puryear Jr. =

U.S. Marine Corps Major General

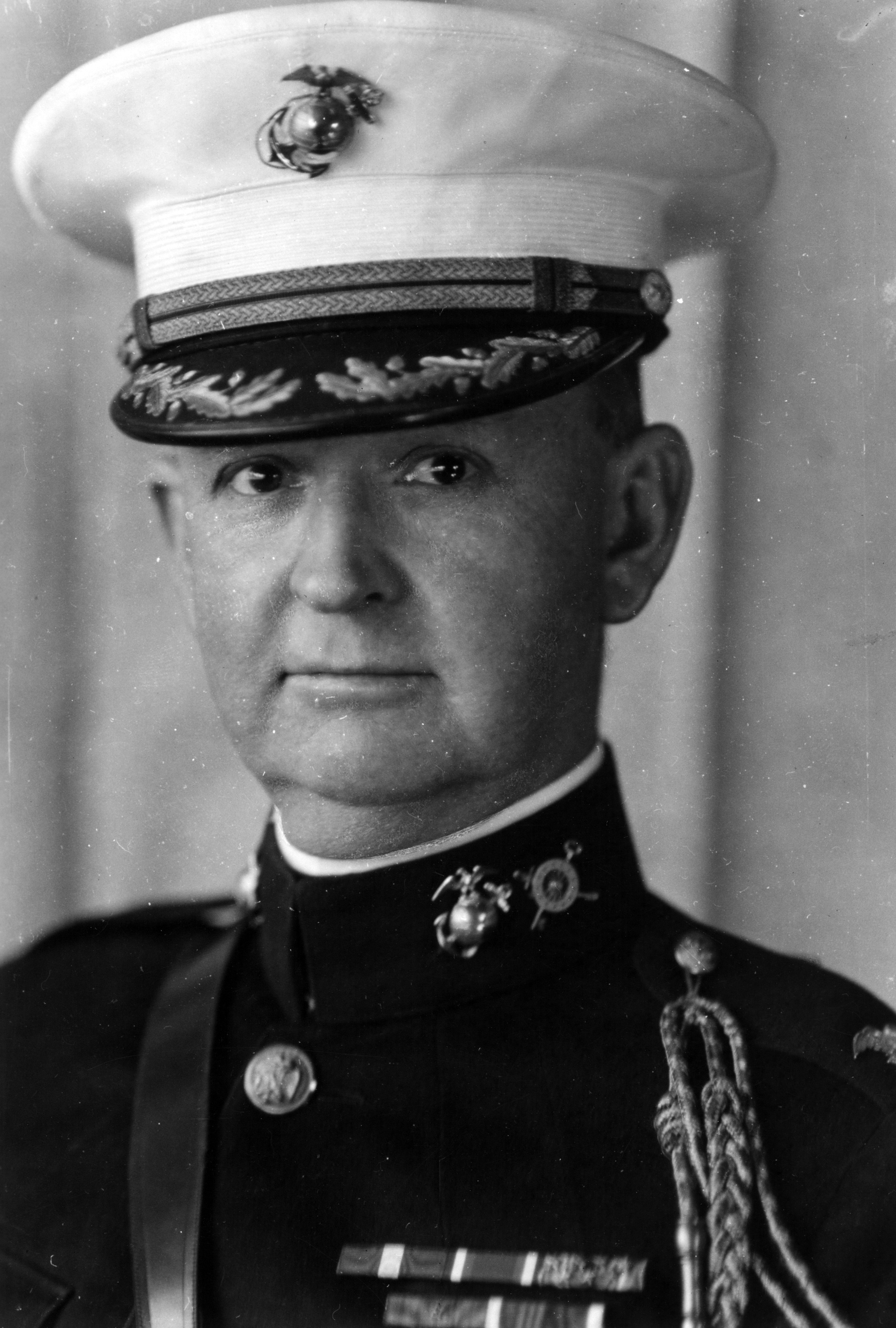
- Bennet Puryear Jr. as Colonel, USMC
- Born: January 9, 1884; Richmond, Virginia, US
- Died: February 11, 1982 (aged 98); Arlington, Virginia, US
- Burial place: Hollywood Cemetery
- Military career
- Allegiance: United States
- Branch: United States Marine Corps
- Service years: 1905–1944
- Rank: Major general
- Service number: 0-792
- Commands: Assistant Quartermaster of the Marine Corps
- Conflicts: Cuban Pacification; World War I: Battle of Château-Thierry; Battle of Soissons; Battle of Saint-Mihiel; Battle of Blanc Mont Ridge; Meuse-Argonne Offensive; Haitian Campaign; World War II
- Awards: Navy Cross; Legion of Merit; Purple Heart

Bennet Puryear Jr. (January 9, 1884 – February 11, 1982) was a highly decorated officer of the United States Marine Corps with the rank of major general. During his service in World War I, he was decorated with the Navy Cross, the United States military's second-highest decoration awarded for valor in combat.

Puryear spent his career mostly in Quartermaster Department of the Marine Corps beginning in the field assignments, ultimately reaching the general's rank and capacity of the Assistant Quartermaster of the Marine Corps and deputy to Seth Williams.

== Early career ==
Bennet Puryear Jr. was born on January 9, 1884, in Richmond, Virginia, as the son of Professor of Natural Science at Richmond College, Bennet Puryear and his wife Ella. He attended local schools in his hometown and also received additional schooling by his father and by his older brother Charles, who worked as professor of mathematics. Puryear enrolled the Texas A&M University in College Station, Texas, and was member of the Corps of Cadets until he left the school before graduation in September 1905.

He subsequently entered the Marine Corps service and was commissioned second lieutenant on September 12, 1905. Puryear was subsequently ordered to the School of Application at Annapolis, Maryland, for further officer training, which he completed in September 1906. He was subsequently attached to the Marine Expeditionary Force and sailed to Cuba in order to suppress armed revolt of independence war veterans who defeated the meager government forces. Puryear remained in Cuba for more than two years and was promoted to the rank of first lieutenant in May 1908.

Upon his return to the United States in January 1909, he was appointed an instructor at Marine Officers School at Port Royal, South Carolina, and taught gunnery until April 1911. During his tenure there, some of his students included Alexander Vandegrift, Roy S. Geiger or Julian C. Smith. Puryear was promoted to the rank of captain in April 1911 and joined Depot of Supplies, Philadelphia as Assistant Quartermaster.

Puryear sailed with 1st Marine Brigade to Cavite, Philippine Islands, and was stationed there until May 1914. He returned to the United States and following the brief leave, he was attached to the Marine barracks at Mare Island Navy Yard, California as post quartermaster.

== World War I ==
Following the declaration of War on Germany in April 1917, Puryear was transferred to Quantico and promoted to the temporary rank of major one month later. He was subsequently ordered to France, arriving to Saint-Nazaire on June 27, 1917. Puryear was subsequently attached to the staff of 2nd Army Division under Major General Omar Bundy as assistant to the assistant chief of staff for personnel.

He was temporary attached to the 5th Marine Regiment and participated in the occupation of the trenches in the Toulouse sector near Verdun in March 1918. Puryear was wounded by effects of combat gas and returned to the 5th Marines in July 1918 in order to participate in Battles of Château-Thierry and Soissons, where he commanded Regimental Combat Train, which carried a machine gun carts. He later took part in the Battle of Saint-Mihiel in September 1918 and later in Battle of Blanc Mont Ridge, where he distinguished himself and received French Croix de guerre 1914–1918 with Gilt Star by the Government of France.

Following the Meuse-Argonne Offensive in November 1918, armistice was signed and Puryear and all his service with 5th Marines was rewarded with Navy Cross, the United States military's second-highest decoration awarded for valor in combat.

== Interwar period ==
Puryear remained in Europe and participated in the march to the Rhine river, passing through Belgium and Luxembourg to Heddesdorf at Coblenz Bridgehead. He participated in the occupation of the Rhineland until the end of May 1919 and returned to the United States at the beginning of June. Puryear was subsequently attached to the Headquarters Marine Corps as a member of procurement policy committee, Munitions Board.

He was ordered for expeditionary duty in Haiti in July 1925 and served for three years as quartermaster and paymaster director of the Garde d'Haiti. Puryear distinguished himself in this capacity and received Haitian Distinguished Service Medal with Diploma. Following his return to the United States in July 1928, he was attached to the Field Officers course at the Marine Corps Schools, Quantico and graduated in June of the following year.

Puryear then served at Depot of Supplies, Philadelphia until October 1930, when he was ordered for duty with Quartermaster Department, Headquarters Marine Corps. He was promoted to the rank of lieutenant colonel in December of that year and remained in there until June 1936, when he was transferred to San Diego for quartermaster duty at local marine base. He was meanwhile promoted to the rank of colonel in October 1934.

== World War II ==
He was appointed post quartermaster at Marine Corps Base Quantico, Virginia, under Major General James C. Breckinridge in June 1937 and held this assignment until February 1942, when he was attached back to the Headquarters Marine Corps as Assistant Quartermaster of the Marine Corps and deputy to Seth Williams. In this capacity, he was co-responsible for the support of development, production, acquisition, and sustainment of general supply, Mortuary Affairs, subsistences, petroleum and water, material and distribution management during peace and war to provide combat power to the U.S. Marine Corps units. For his new capacity, he was promoted to the rank of brigadier general in August 1942.

Puryear also participated in the inspection tour of commandant Thomas Holcomb in the Pacific theater and visited Guadalcanal during the ongoing campaign in October 1942. He remained in the capacity of Assistant Quartermaster until the beginning of May 1944, when he retired from the Marine Corps after almost 39 years of active service. Puryear was decorated with the Legion of Merit for his service during World War II and advanced to the rank of major general for having been specially commended in combat.

== Retirement ==
Following his retirement, general Puryear Jr. settled in Arlington, Virginia, and was active in the Marine Corps Historical Foundation, where he received a Certificate of Appreciation by Commandant Robert H. Barrow for his contributions to the Oral History Program.

General Puryear died of heart attack on February 11, 1982. Puryear was married to Harriet Newell Ragland Hill until her death in March 1942. He then remarried to Elizabeth Gary (1898–1987). He had a son from first marriage, Alan Christian Puryear (1914–1986) who served as first lieutenant in the United States Army during World War II. General Puryear Jr. is buried at Hollywood Cemetery in his native Richmond, Virginia.

== Decorations ==
Here is the ribbon bar of Major General Puryear Jr.:

1st Row	Navy Cross			
2nd Row	Legion of Merit	Purple Heart Medal	Marine Corps Expeditionary Medal	Cuban Pacification Medal
3rd Row	World War I Victory Medal with four battle clasps	Army of Occupation of Germany Medal	American Defense Service Medal	American Campaign Medal
4th Row	Asiatic–Pacific Campaign Medal	World War II Victory Medal	French Croix de guerre 1914–1918 with Gilt Star	Haitian Distinguished Service Medal with Diploma
