= Anne Conway =

Anne Conway may refer to:

- Anne Seymour Damer (1748–1828), née Conway, English sculptor
- Anne C. Conway (born 1950), US federal judge
- Anne Conway (philosopher) (1631–1679), English philosopher
- Anna Conway (born 1973), American visual artist
