= Leonard E. Rea =

U.S. Marine Corps Major General

Leonard Earl Rea
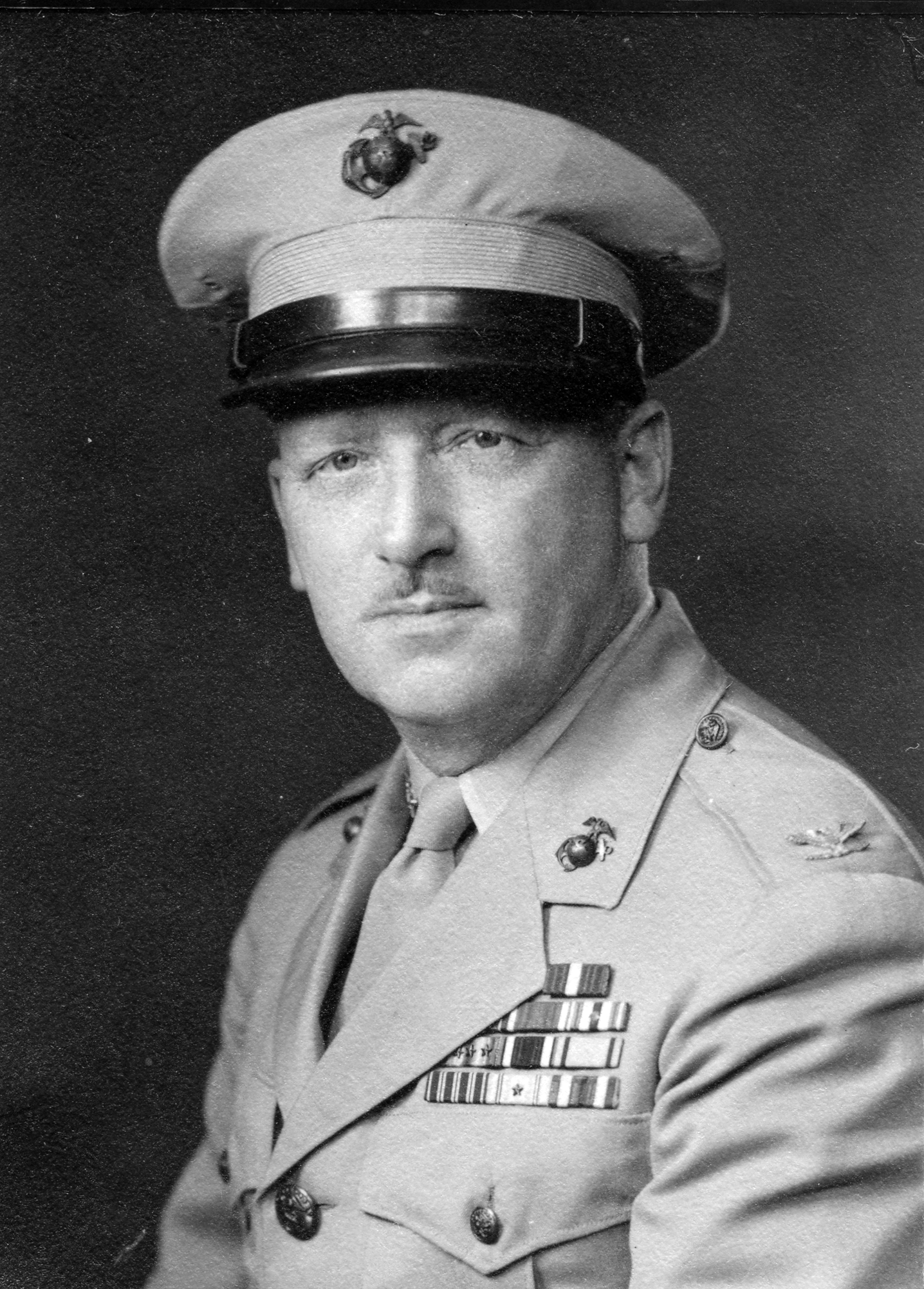
- Leonard E. Rea as colonel, USMC
- Born: March 14, 1897; Auburn, New York, U.S.
- Died: May 12, 1972 (aged 75); Syracuse, New York, U.S.
- Burial place: White Haven Memorial Park
- Military career
- Allegiance: United States of America
- Branch: United States Marine Corps
- Service years: 1917–1919, 1921-1953
- Rank: Major general
- Service number: 0-2205
- Commands: QM of I Marine Amphibious Corps
- Conflicts: World War I: Battle of Belleau Wood; Battle of Soissons; Battle of Saint-Mihiel; Battle of Blanc Mont Ridge; Meuse-Argonne Offensive; Dominican Campaign; Nicaraguan Campaign; World War II: Bougainville Campaign
- Awards: Navy Cross; Distinguished Service Cross; Silver Star (2); Legion of Merit; Purple Heart

Leonard Earl Rea (March 14, 1897 – May 12, 1972) was a highly decorated officer of the United States Marine Corps with the rank of major general, who served as quartermaster of I Marine Amphibious Corps during World War II. He later served as chief of the supply branch at Headquarters Marine Corps.

== Early career ==
Leonard E. Rea was born on March 14, 1897, in Auburn, New York, and after graduation from high school, decided to enlist in the United States Marine Corps on April 19, 1917. Following basic training, Rea was assigned to 17th Company, 1st Battalion, 5th Marine Regiment, stationed at the Philadelphia Navy Yard. He left for France almost immediately after regiment's activation and arrived in Saint-Nazaire in July 1917. Rea was promoted to the rank of corporal and decorated with the Marine Corps Good Conduct Medal for his enlisted service. He was sent to the trenches of the Toulon Sector near Verdun in March 1918 and subsequently participated in the Battles of Belleau Wood and Soissons.

Rea received a provisional battlefield promotion to second lieutenant on July 29, 1918, and was appointed a platoon commander in 1st Battalion's 66th Company. He participated in the Battle of Saint-Mihiel in September 1918 and was appointed commander of a combat liaison group between the 5th Marine Regiment and the 5th Infantry Division on the right flank of the defensive line. Despite a rapid movement of the line, Rea led his liaison group between enemy lines and was decorated with two Silver Stars.

Rea led his platoon in the Battle of Blanc Mont Ridge at the end of October 1918 and was wounded by enemy machine gun fire. Despite being unable to move without assistance, he remained in command of his platoon until ordered to the rear by his commanding officer. For his gallantry in action, he was decorated with the Distinguished Service Cross and later with the Navy Cross.

After his recovery from his wounds, Rea rejoined his unit and participated in fighting in the Argonne Forest during the Meuse-Argonne Offensive at the beginning of November 1918. Following the Armistice, Rea served in the Allied occupation of the Rhineland until June 1919. He returned to the United States one month later and was honorably discharged from the Marine Corps with the rank of first lieutenant in July 1919.

== World War II ==
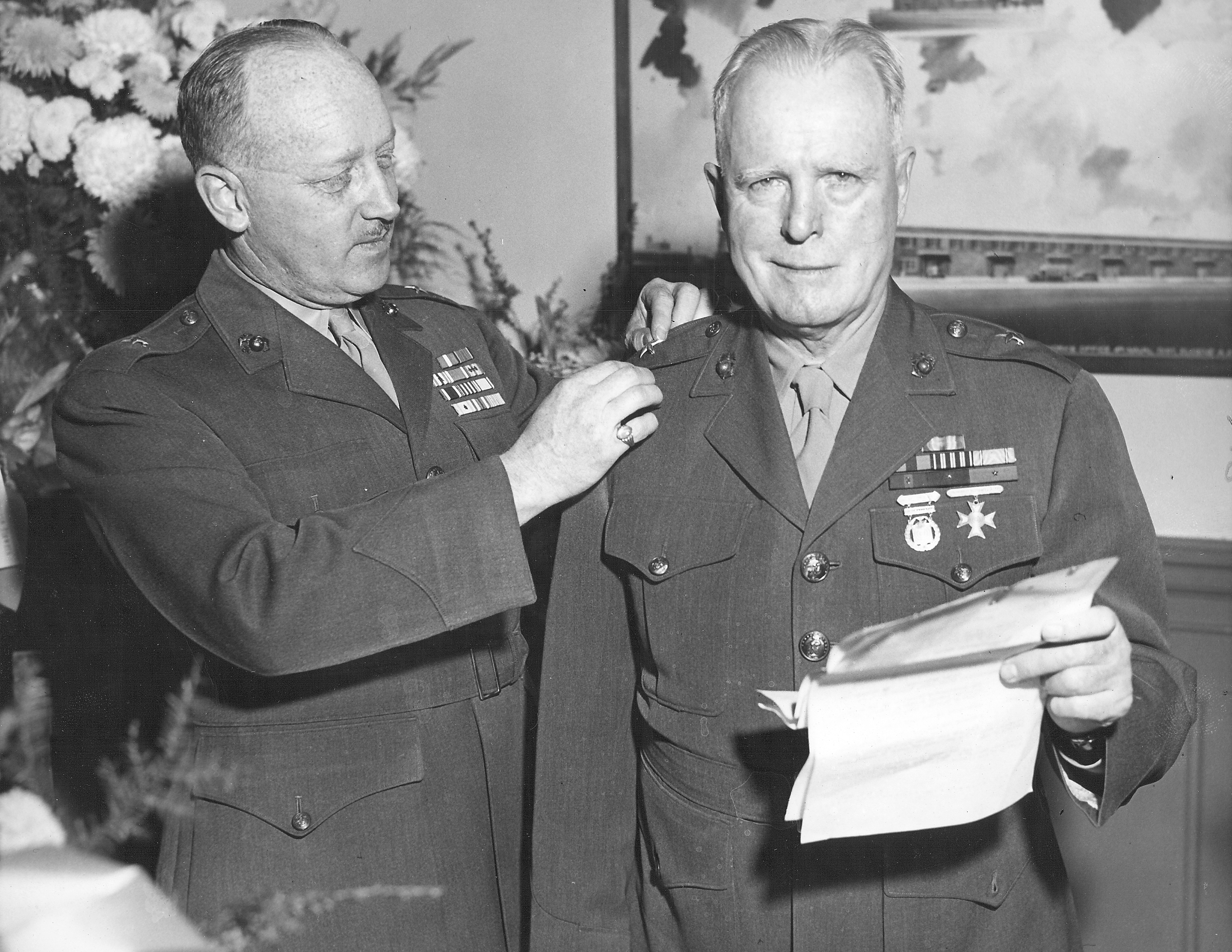
BG Leonard E. Rea promotes Maurice C. Gregory (Commander, Depot of Supplies, Philadelphia) to the rank of Brigadier general, November 1944.

Rea was ordered to Washington, D.C., where he was appointed assistant to the officer in charge of the supply division of the Quartermaster Department under General Seth Williams at Headquarters Marine Corps. He was appointed officer in charge of the supply division in April 1942. He was later transferred to the staff of I Marine Amphibious Corps under the command of Major General Charles D. Barrett and appointed commanding officer of Corps Supply Services. He was one of the last people who saw Barrett alive, and, after participating in the Bougainville Campaign, he was transferred back to the United States. While serving in the Pacific theater of operations, he was decorated with the Dutch Order of Orange-Nassau with Swords, Commander by the Government of the Netherlands for his service in connection with Dutch troops.

On his return to the United States, Rea was assigned back to the Headquarters Marine Corps in Washington, D.C. and appointed executive officer at the Quartermaster Department. During his service in this capacity, he was promoted to the rank of brigadier general on 30 April 1944. Rea served in this capacity until August 1946, when he was appointed depot quartermaster in Philadelphia. For his distinguished World War II service, Rea received the Legion of Merit.

His last service assignment came in October 1950, when he was appointed chief of the supply branch at Headquarters Marine Corps. Rea was relieved of all active duties and subsequently retired from the Marine Corps in November 1953. He was advanced to the rank of major general for having been specially commended in combat.

== Decorations ==
Here is the ribbon bar of Major General Leonard E. Rea:

1st Row	Navy Cross		Distinguished Service Cross	
2nd Row	Silver Star with Oak Leaf Cluster	Legion of Merit	Purple Heart	Marine Corps Good Conduct Medal
3rd Row	Marine Corps Expeditionary Medal	World War I Victory Medal with four battle clasps	Army of Occupation of Germany Medal	Second Nicaraguan Campaign Medal
4th Row	China Service Medal	American Defense Service Medal with Fleet Clasp	American Campaign Medal	Asiatic-Pacific Campaign Medal with one service star
5th Row	World War II Victory Medal	National Defense Service Medal	Nicaraguan Cross of Valor	Dutch Order of Orange-Nassau with Swords, Commander
