= Foxborough High School =

Location
- 60 South Street; Foxborough, Massachusetts 02035; United States; 42.0551039°N 71.2518566°W

Information
- Type: Public
- School district: Foxborough Public Schools
- NCES District ID: 2504950
- Superintendent: Amy A. Berdos
- NCES School ID: 250495000708
- Principal: James Donovan
- Grades: 9-12
- Enrollment: 736
- Average class size: 11.32
- Colors: Navy Blue, White, Gold
- Mascot: Warrior
- Website: www.foxborough.k12.ma.us

Foxborough High School (FHS) is a public high school in Foxborough, Massachusetts. Part of the Foxborough Public Schools district, it serves about 750 students in grades 9 to 12 at 120 South Street. In 2026, the student body was about 74 percent White, 10 percent Black, 8.5 percent Hispanic, and 4 percent Asian.

Warriors are the school mascot. Native American iconography and the image of a Blackfoot chief were removed from the school's sports gear in 2023.

== History ==
Foxborough High School was preceded by the English and Classical School established by James L. Stone. It was in the Town House in 1858. Housed in a public building, it was required to admit some students who could not pay. It closed when a public high school was established. In 1928 a new high school building opened. In 1973 a new high school building opened and the old building became a middle school named for former FHS principal John J. Ahern.

In 2009 a vote was held on millions of dollars of repairs for the school. In 2013 the history department ran a congressional bill process simulation with student roleplaying legislators. Later that year, the school made national headlines after a class ring was returned to its owner after 40 years.

== Extracurriculars ==
The school has a jazz band.

=== Sports ===
- The football team has four championships.
- The school has a football rivalry with Mansfield High School.
- The girls soccer tram won a state championship in 1987.

== Alumni ==
- Tom Nalen, football player
