= Foxborough, Massachusetts =

Foxborough, Massachusetts Foxboro
- Town
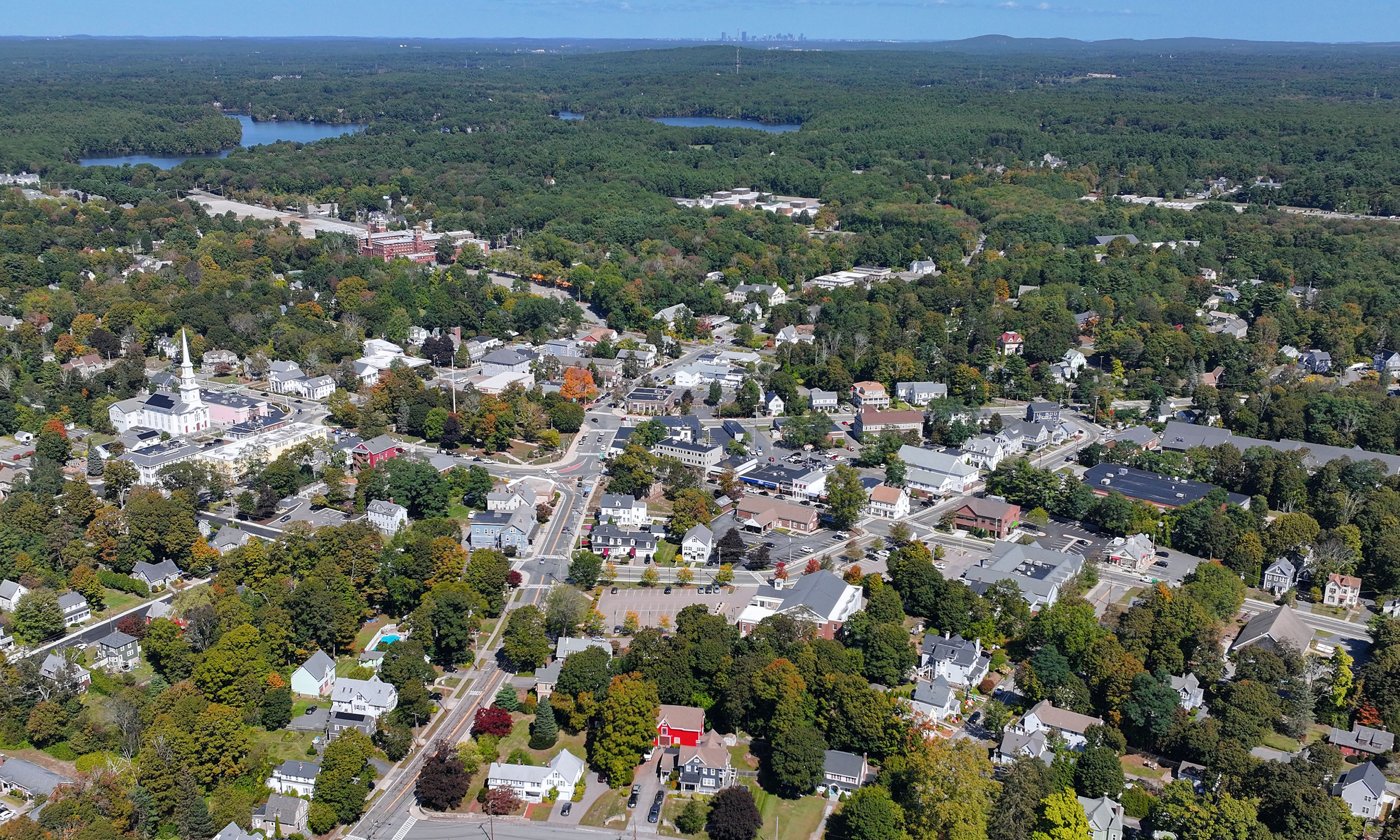
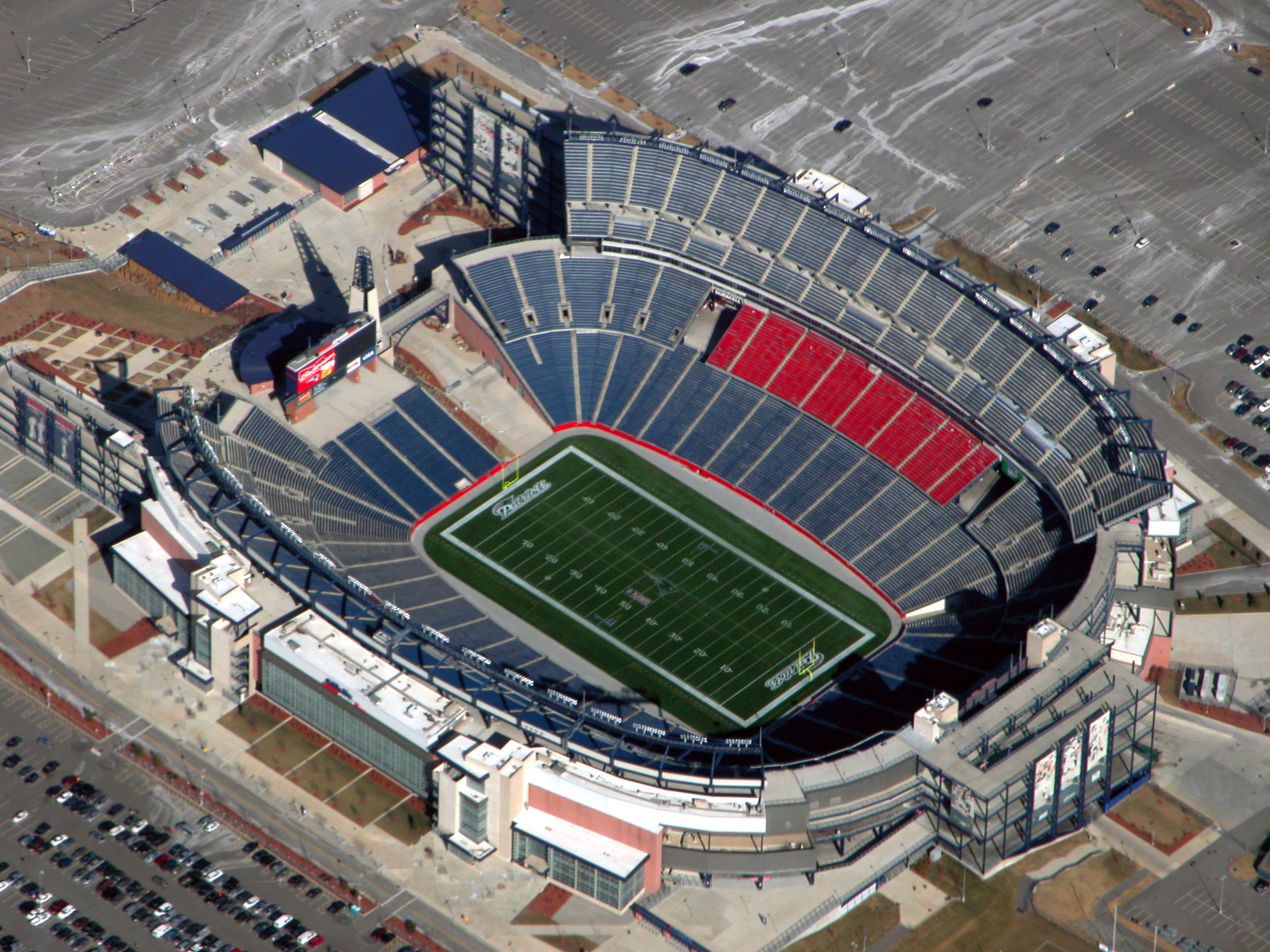
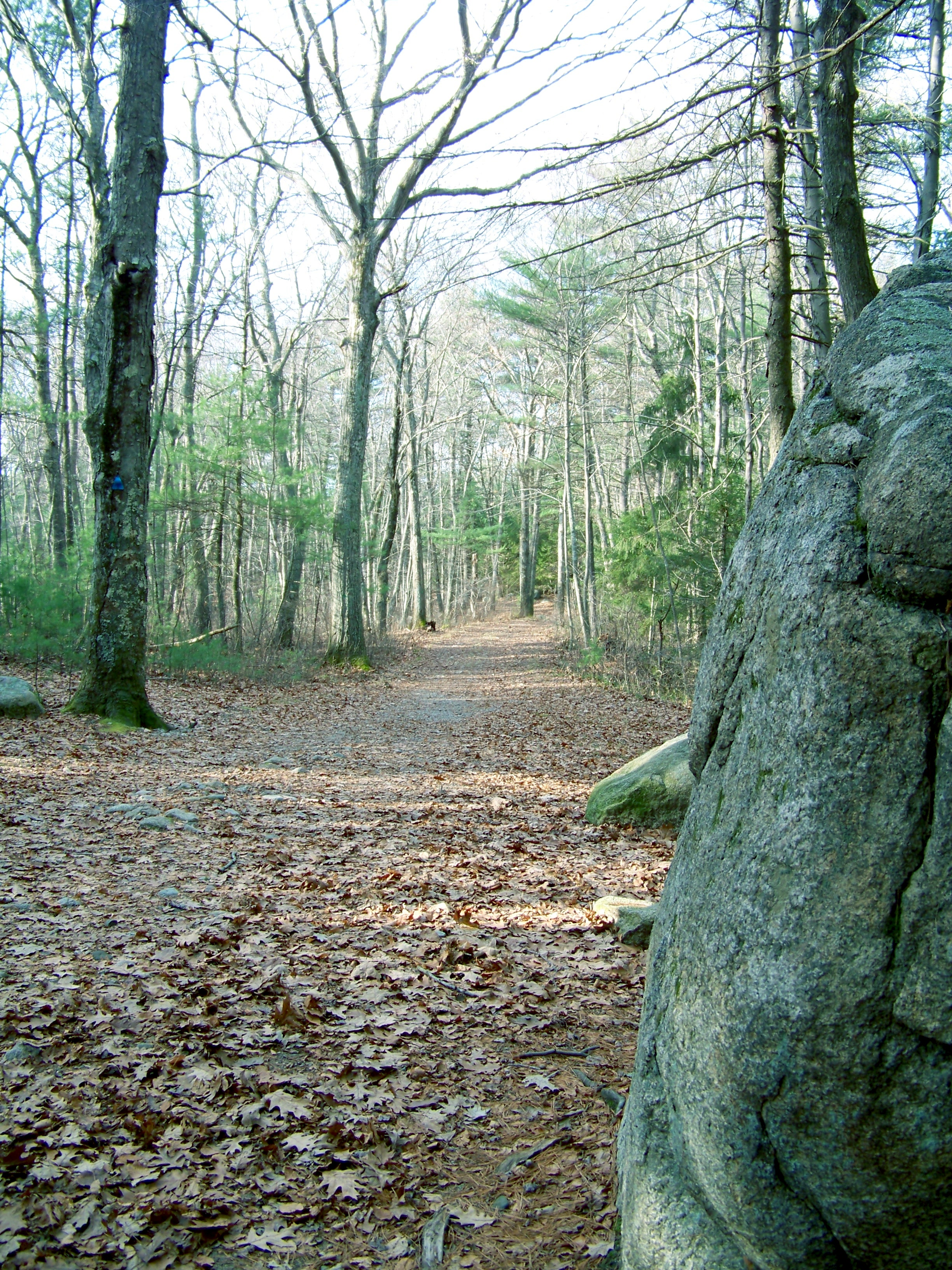
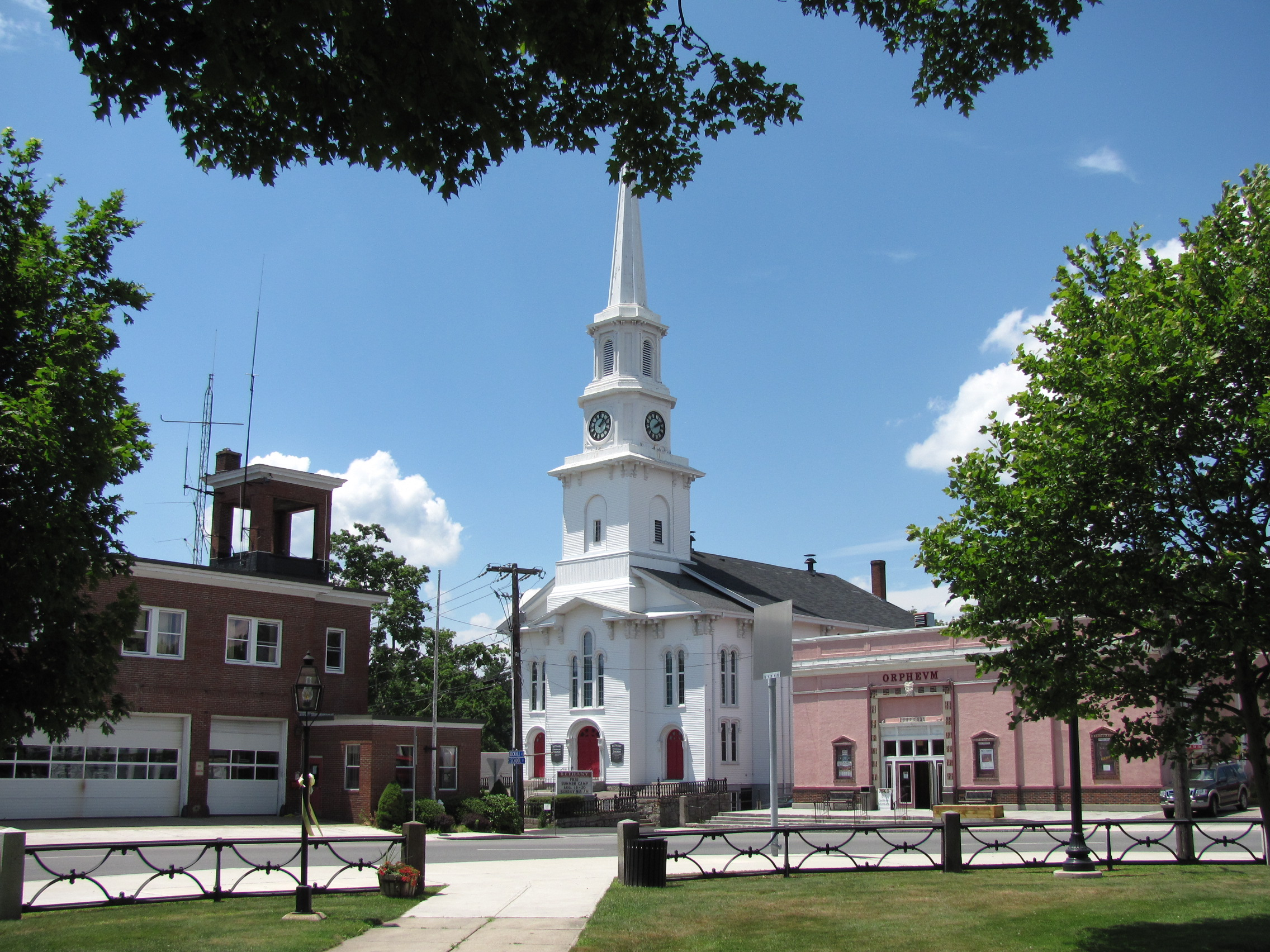
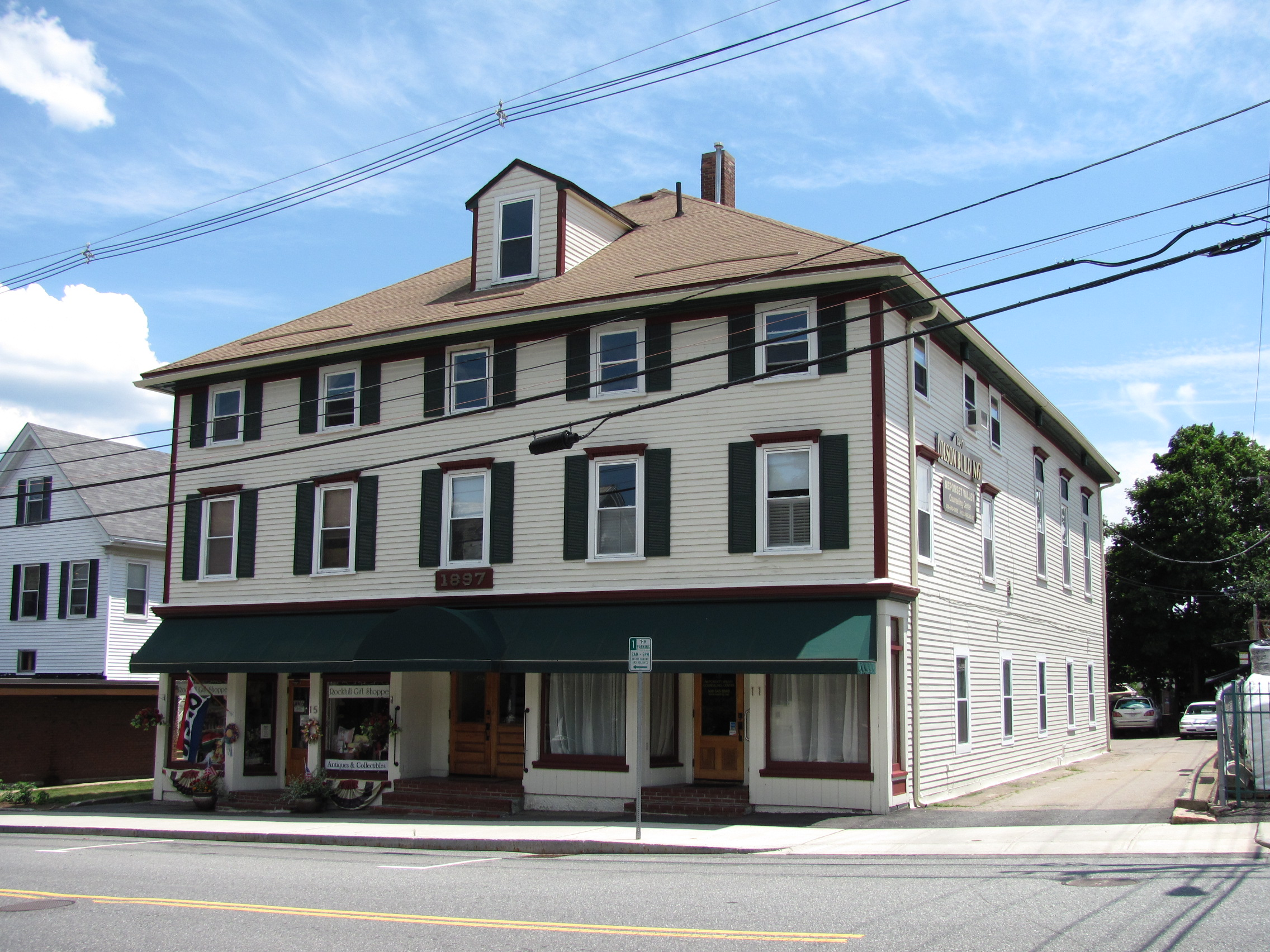
- Downtown Foxborough, with Boston visible in the distance Gillette Stadium F. Gilbert Hills State Forest Congregational Church Grange Hall

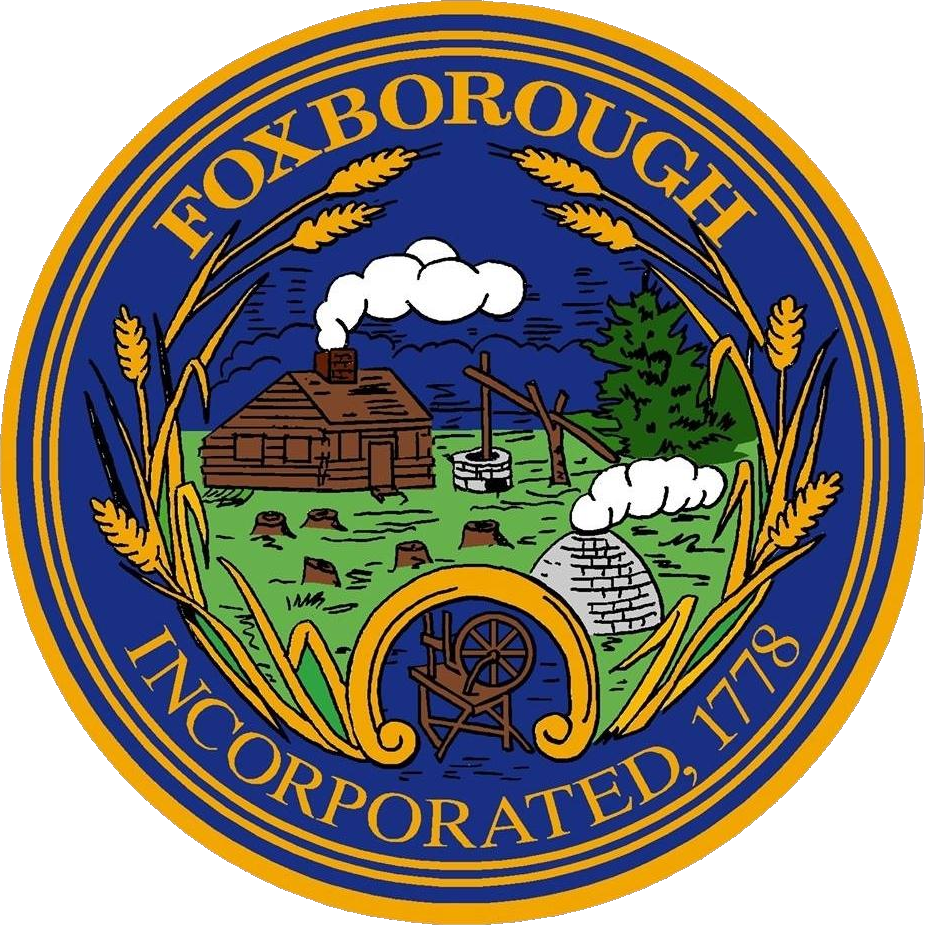
- Seal
- Nickname: The Gem of Norfolk County
- Location in Norfolk County in Massachusetts
- Coordinates: 42°03′54″N 71°15′0″W
- Country: United States
- State: Massachusetts
- County: Norfolk
- Settled: 1704
- Incorporated: June 10, 1778
- Named for: Charles James Fox

Government
  - Type: Open town meeting
  - Town Manager: Paige Duncan

Area
  - Total: 20.9 sq mi (54.1 km^{2})
  - Land: 20 sq mi (52 km^{2})
  - Water: 0.81 sq mi (2.11 km^{2}) 3.88%
- Elevation: 285 ft (87 m)

Population (2020)
  - Total: 18,618
  - Density: 927.3/sq mi (358.04/km^{2})
- Time zone: UTC−5 (Eastern)
  - Summer (DST): UTC−4 (Eastern)
- ZIP Code: 02035
- Area code: 508/774
- FIPS code: 25-24820
- Website: foxboroughma.gov

Foxborough is a town in Norfolk County, Massachusetts, United States. Located within the Boston metropolitan area, it sits approximately 22 miles (35 kilometers) southwest of the city in Massachusetts' MetroWest region. As of the 2020 census, the population was 18,618.

"Foxborough" is the official spelling of the town name per local government, but the abbreviated spelling "Foxboro" is common and is used by the United States Postal Service.

Foxborough is the location site of Gillette Stadium, home of the New England Patriots of the National Football League (NFL) and the New England Revolution of Major League Soccer (MLS).

== History ==
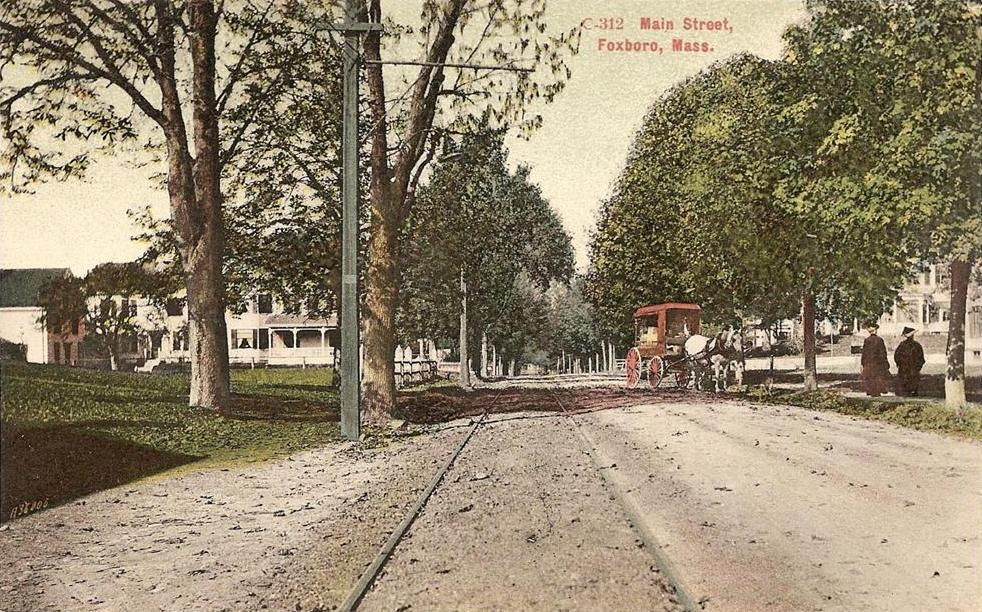
Main Street c. 1906

Settled in 1704 and incorporated in 1778, the town of Foxborough was named for Charles James Fox, a Whig member of Parliament and a staunch supporter of the Colonies in the years leading up to the American Revolution.

The town was once home to the world's largest straw hat factory, erected in 1886. The building became the Bay State Boot and Shoe Company which closed in 1891. In 1894, the building became the Inman and Kimball hat factory. It burned to the ground during a spectacular mid-day fire in 1936. The Foxborough Post Office now stands on the site.

Foxborough was composed of small neighborhood communities until the early 1900s. These included Foxvale/Paineburgh, which remained semi-independent until the early twentieth century; Quaker Hill in South Foxborough; and Lakeview/Donkeyville in West Foxborough.

Schaefer Stadium (later known as Sullivan Stadium, then Foxboro Stadium) opened in 1971 as the home of the New England Patriots, after the football team spent its first eleven seasons playing at various stadiums in Boston. The family of Billy Sullivan owned both the Patriots and the stadium until they sold the team in 1988. The stadium, however, lapsed into bankruptcy and was then bought by paper magnate Robert Kraft. With Kraft in control of Foxboro Stadium, he prevented the Patriots from relocating to St. Louis in 1994 by refusing to let the team break their lease, then bought the Patriots outright. Kraft then founded the New England Revolution, one of the charter clubs of Major League Soccer, in 1996.

Gillette Stadium opened in 2002 as a replacement for Foxboro Stadium. The Patriot Place shopping plaza, built on land surrounding the stadium bought by Kraft, completed construction in 2009. The plaza includes a variety of restaurants, clothing stores, and other retailers.

Foxborough hosted multiple matches during the 1994 FIFA World Cup at Foxboro Stadium. Thirty-two years later, Foxborough hosted the 2026 FIFA World Cup at Gillette Stadium.

== Geography ==
According to the United States Census Bureau, the town has a total area of 20.9 sq mi (54.1 km^{2}), of which 20.1 sq mi (52.0 km^{2}) is land and 0.81 sq mi (2.1 km^{2}) (3.88%) is water.

For the purposes of the United States Census Bureau, the built-up central area of Foxborough known as the Foxborough Census Designated Place (CDP) has a total area of 7.6 km^{2} (2.9 sq mi), of which 7.5 km^{2} (2.9 sq mi) is land and 0.1 km^{2} (0.039 sq mi) (1.69%) is water.

=== Climate ===
Foxborough's climate is humid continental (Köppen: Dfa) with four distinct seasons, which is the predominant climate for Massachusetts and New England. Summers are typically warm to hot, rainy, and humid, while winters are cold, windy, and snowy. Spring and fall are usually mild, but conditions are widely varied, depending on wind direction and jet stream positioning. The warmest month is July, with an average high temperature of 83 °F and an average low temperature of 62 °F. The coldest month is January, with an average high temperature of 36 °F and an average low temperature of 18 °F. Periods exceeding 90 °F in summer and below 10 °F in winter are not uncommon but rarely extended, with about 14 days per year seeing the former extreme. Because of the town's relatively short distance from the Atlantic Ocean, temperatures tend to remain warmer than locations further inland. Like the rest of the northeastern seaboard, precipitation is distributed fairly evenly throughout the entire year, with the winter months receiving slightly more precipitation than the summer months. Powerful storm systems known as Nor'easters can produce heavy amounts of rain and snow at any time of the year, but these storms most often strike during the winter months, causing significant snowfall amounts and blizzard conditions. Thunderstorms occur somewhat frequently in the summer, occasionally bringing heavy downpours, damaging winds, and hail. Tornado activity is relatively low in the area, although there have been a fair share of tornado warnings issued over the years. Due to its location along the United States eastern seaboard, Foxborough is somewhat vulnerable to Atlantic hurricanes and tropical storms that threaten the region from late summer into early autumn.

Climate data for Foxborough, Massachusetts
Month	Jan	Feb	Mar	Apr	May	Jun	Jul	Aug	Sep	Oct	Nov	Dec	Year
Record high °F (°C)	68 (20)	70 (21)	90 (32)	96 (36)	96 (36)	97 (36)	102 (39)	102 (39)	97 (36)	87 (31)	78 (26)	76 (24)	102 (39)
Mean daily maximum °F (°C)	36 (2)	40 (4)	48 (9)	59 (15)	70 (21)	78 (26)	83 (28)	81 (27)	73 (23)	62 (17)	52 (11)	41 (5)	60.25 (15.69)
Mean daily minimum °F (°C)	18 (−8)	21 (−6)	28 (−2)	37 (3)	47 (8)	57 (14)	62 (17)	61 (16)	53 (12)	42 (6)	33 (1)	24 (−4)	40.25 (4.58)
Record low °F (°C)	−19 (−28)	−16 (−27)	−4 (−20)	14 (−10)	28 (−2)	37 (3)	42 (6)	39 (4)	30 (−1)	20 (−7)	4 (−16)	−14 (−26)	−19 (−28)
Average precipitation inches (mm)	3.78 (96)	3.68 (93)	4.81 (122)	4.39 (112)	3.65 (93)	4.08 (104)	3.91 (99)	3.91 (99)	3.66 (93)	4.35 (110)	4.46 (113)	4.52 (115)	49.2 (1,250)
Average snowfall inches (cm)	15.0 (38)	11.9 (30)	9.6 (24)	2.6 (6.6)	0 (0)	0 (0)	0 (0)	0 (0)	0 (0)	0.2 (0.51)	2.1 (5.3)	11.5 (29)	52.8 (134)
Average precipitation days (≥ 0.01 in)	11.0	9.5	11.6	11.8	12.3	11.3	10.2	9.4	8.9	10.1	11.3	11.1	128.5
Average snowy days (≥ 0.1 in)	7.3	5.9	4.8	1.1	0	0	0	0	0	0.2	1.2	5.2	25.7
Mean monthly sunshine hours	164.3	169.5	213.9	228.0	266.6	288.0	300.7	275.9	237.0	207.7	144.0	142.6	2,638.2
Source 1: Weather Channel
Source 2: NOAA (extremes 1904–present)

== Demographics ==
=== Entire town ===
Historical population
Year	Pop.	±%
1790	674	—
1850	1,880	+178.9%
1860	2,879	+53.1%
1870	3,057	+6.2%
1880	2,950	−3.5%
1890	2,933	−0.6%
1900	3,266	+11.4%
1910	3,863	+18.3%
1920	4,136	+7.1%
1930	5,347	+29.3%
1940	6,303	+17.9%
1950	7,030	+11.5%
1960	10,136	+44.2%
1970	14,218	+40.3%
1980	14,148	−0.5%
1990	14,637	+3.5%
2000	16,246	+11.0%
2010	16,865	+3.8%
2020	18,618	+10.4%
2024*	18,791	+0.9%
* = population estimate. Source: United States census records and Population Estimates Program data. Source: U.S. Decennial Census

As of the census of 2000, there were 16,246 people, 6,141 households, and 4,396 families residing in the town. The population density was 809.1 inhabitants per square mile (312.4/km^{2}). There were 6,299 housing units at an average density of 313.7 units per square mile (121.1 units/km^{2}). The racial makeup of the town was 97.09% White, 0.82% Black or African American, 0.11% Native American, 1.22% Asian, 0.01% Pacific Islander, 0.20% from other races, and 0.54% from two or more races. Hispanic or Latino people of any race were 1.06% of the population.

There were 6,141 households, out of which 35.3% had children under the age of 18 living with them, 59.9% were married couples living together, 8.6% had a female householder with no husband present, and 28.4% were non-families. Of all households 23.4% were made up of individuals, and 8.6% had someone living alone who was 65 years of age or older. The average household size was 2.63 and the average family size was 3.15.

In the town, 26.5% of the population was under the age of 18, 5.0% was from 18 to 24, 32.1% from 25 to 44, 24.5% from 45 to 64, and 11.9% were 65 years of age or older. The median age was 38 years. For every 100 females, there were 95.8 males. For every 100 females age 18 and over, there were 92.2 males.

The median income for a household in the town was $64,323, and the median income for a family was $78,811. Based on data from the 2007–2011 American Community Survey 5-Year Estimates, these figures have risen to $92,370 as the median income for a household in the town and $108,209 as the median income for a family. Males had a median income of $51,901 versus $35,748 for females. The per capita income for the town was $32,294, but this figure has risen to $42,236. About 2.3% of families and 3.1% of the population were below the poverty line, including 2.0% of those under age 18 and 6.2% of those age 65 or over.

=== Foxborough CDP ===
The built-up central business district is designated by the United States Census Bureau as the Foxborough Census Designated Place for record keeping purposes (this is common among many larger population New England towns).

As of the census of 2000, there were 5,509 people, 2,486 households, and 1,372 families residing in the CDP. The population density was 730.9 people/km^{2} (1,893 people/mi^{2}). There were 2,576 housing units at an average density of 341.8 units/km^{2} (885 units/mi^{2}). The racial makeup of the CDP was 96.57% White, 1.42% Black or African American, 0.13% Native American, 1.07% Asian, 0.29% from other races, and 0.53% from two or more races. Hispanic or Latino people of any race were 1.60% of the population.

There were 2,486 households, out of which 25.9% had children under the age of 18 living with them, 41.9% were married couples living together, 9.5% had a female householder with no husband present, and 44.8% were non-families. Of all households 37.8% were made up of individuals, and 13.6% had someone living alone who was 65 years of age or older. The average household size was 2.18 and the average family size was 2.95.

In the CDP, 21.7% of the population was under the age of 18, 5.3% was from 18 to 24, 35.0% from 25 to 44, 21.6% from 45 to 64, and 16.4% were 65 years of age or older. The median age was 38 years. For every 100 females, there were 92.1 males. For every 100 females age 18 and over, there were 87.6 males.

The median income for a household in the CDP was $50,431, and the median income for a family was $58,924. Males had a median income of $42,030 versus $35,370 for females. The per capita income for the CDP was $31,245. About 4.1% of families and 5.1% of the population were below the poverty line, including 5.4% of those under age 18 and 8.7% of those age 65 or over.

== Arts and culture ==
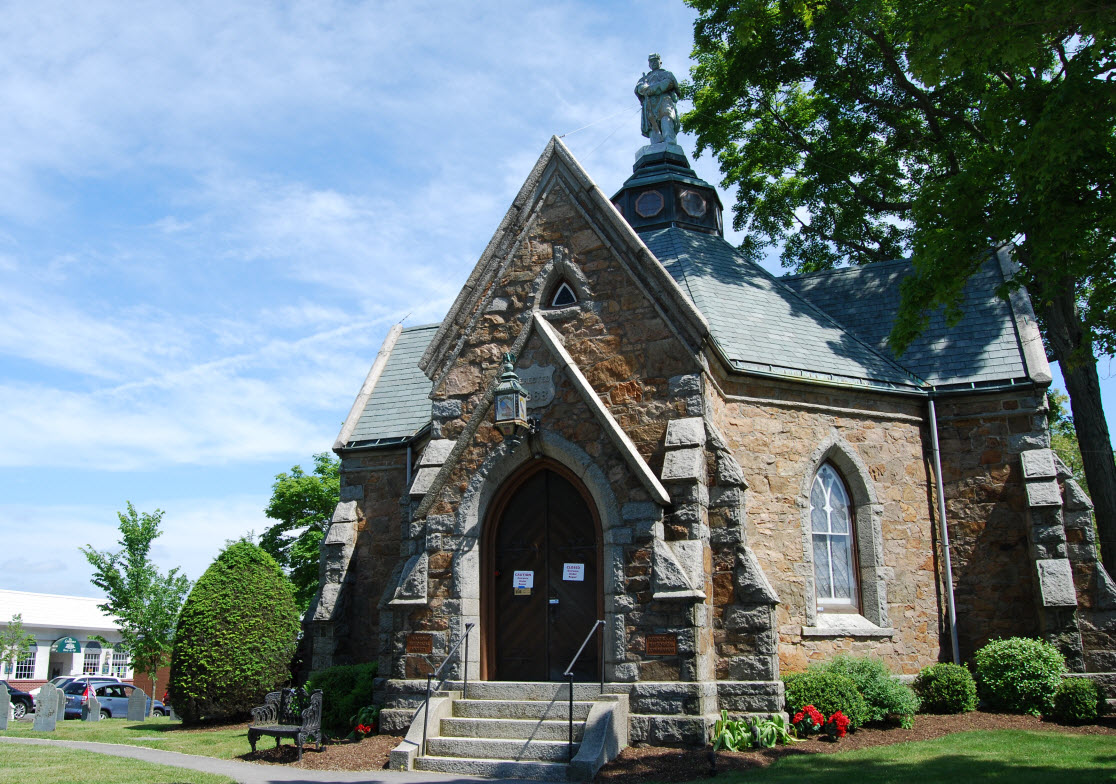
Memorial Hall

Points of interest include:

- Marylin Rodman Performing Arts Center – hosts music shows, comedy shows, and plays
- Foxboro Grange Hall – a National Historic Register place, added in 1983
- Gillette Stadium – home of the New England Patriots and the New England Revolution; the Patriots Hall of Fame and the statue of Tom Brady are located adjacent to the stadium
- Patriot Place – an outdoor shopping and entertainment complex next to Gillette Stadium
- F. Gilbert Hills State Forest – Encompassing 1,027 acres (4.16 km^{2}) in Foxborough and Wrentham, the state forest is used for hiking, biking, cross country skiing, horseback riding, and observing nature. Contained on state forest land are some unique stone structures that some believe were made and used by the native Algonquin tribes prior to the town's founding.
- Memorial Hall – a stone building and monument in the center of town, formerly housing the library, now dedicated to those who served in the armed forces, containing a permanent collection of historical artifacts relating to town history

== Government ==
Foxborough is run by a five-member board of selectmen and elected town officials like the town moderator and town clerk. Day-to-day operations involving items under the Board of Selectmen's purview is handled by an appointed Town Manager. Stephanie A. McGowan is the chair.

== Education ==
=== Public schools ===
The Foxborough Public Schools district administers the following schools:

- Charles G. Taylor Elementary School (K–4)
- Vincent M. Igo Elementary School (Pre-K–4)
- Mabelle M. Burrell Elementary School (K–4)
- John J. Ahern Middle School (5–8)
- Foxborough High School (9–12)

=== Private schools ===
- Foxborough Regional Charter School, a public, college preparatory school for grades K–12.
- The Sage School, a private school for gifted learners in pre-kindergarten through 8th grade.

== Notable people ==
- Sam Berns—inspiring teenager who was born with progeria
- Seth Boyden—born in Foxborough, later became one of Newark, New Jersey's foremost citizen-inventors, responsible for inventing patent leather, malleable iron and other processes as well as one of the first to develop daguerreotype
- Frank Boyden—headmaster of Deerfield Academy
- Jeremy Collins—winner of Survivor: Cambodia
- Anna Conway—painter based in New York City
- Calvin R. Johnson—member of the Wisconsin State Assembly
- JoJo—born Joanna Levesque, an R&B singer-songwriter and actress
- Camille Kostek—model who was on the cover of the Sports Illustrated Swimsuit Issue
- Tim Lefebvre—bassist who plays with Tedeschi Trucks Band and played bass on David Bowie's final album Blackstar
- Tom Nalen—former professional football player for the Denver Broncos
- Sidney Lawton Smith—designer, etcher, engraver, illustrator, and bookplate artist
- Chris Sullivan—musician, actor, cast member of The Electric Company
- Nguyen Van Thieu—president of South Vietnam 1967–1975
- Madame Nguyen Van Thieu—the last serving First Lady of South Vietnam, 1967–1975
- Seth Williams—Marine Corps officer, Quartermaster General of the United States Marine Corps 1937–1944
