= Foxboro Grange Hall =

- U.S. National Register of Historic Places
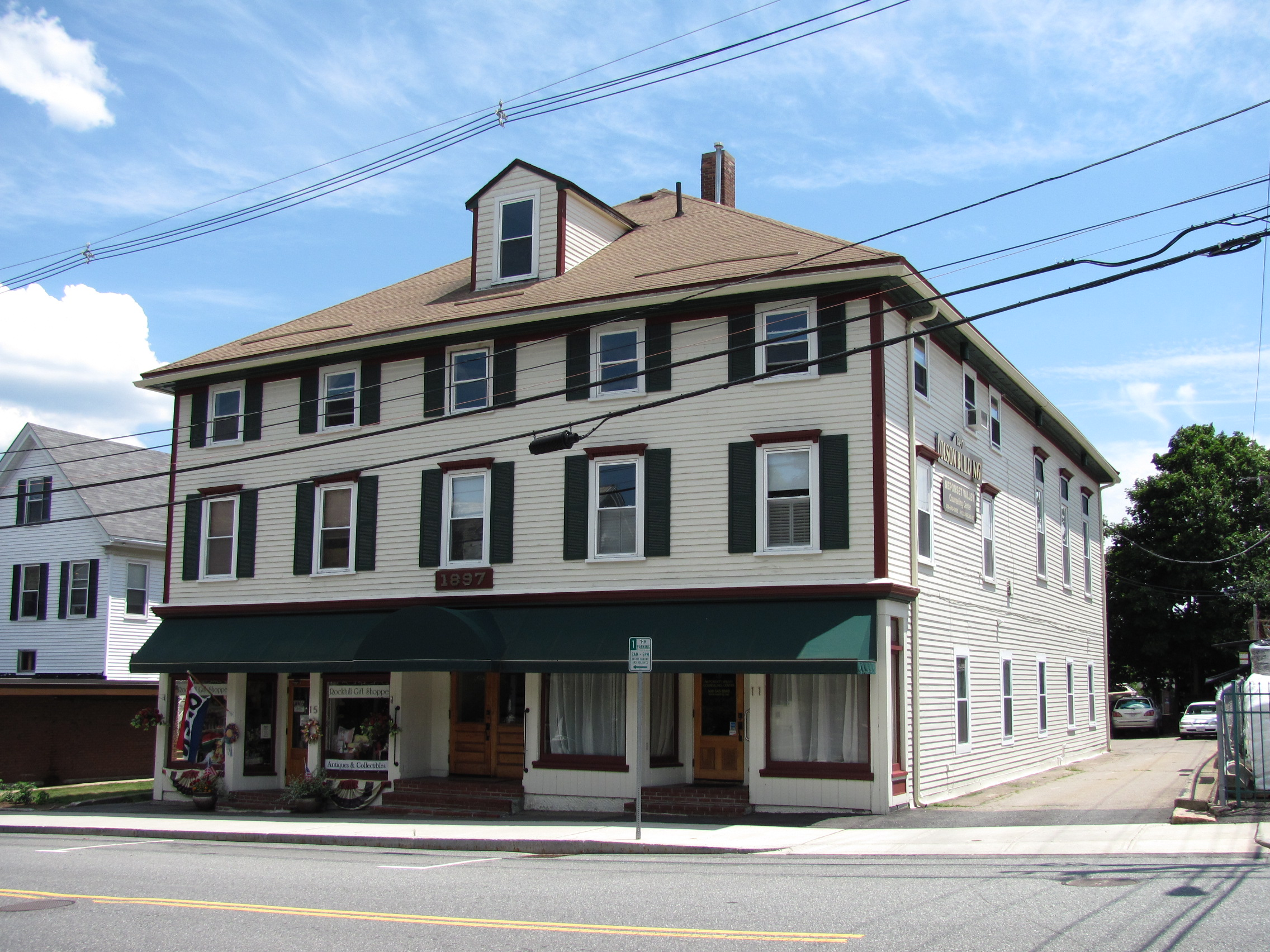
- Foxboro Grange Hall

- Location within Massachusetts Location within the United States
- Location: Foxborough, Massachusetts
- Coordinates: 42°3′56″N 71°15′2″W
- Built: 1897
- Architectural style: Late Victorian
- NRHP reference No.: 83000595
- Added to NRHP: April 21, 1983

The Foxboro Grange Hall is a historic Grange building at 11–15 Bird Street in Foxborough, Massachusetts. It is a three-story wood-frame structure, five bays wide at the upper levels and three storefronts wide on the first level, with a hip roof and clapboard siding. Built in 1897, it is one of few wood-frame commercial buildings in the town, and is a reminder of the town's agricultural past for its historic use as a Grange hall. The first floor has been adapted for retail use.

The hall was listed on the National Register of Historic Places in 1983.

== See also ==
- National Register of Historic Places listings in Norfolk County, Massachusetts
