= Tom Nalen =

American football player (born 1971)

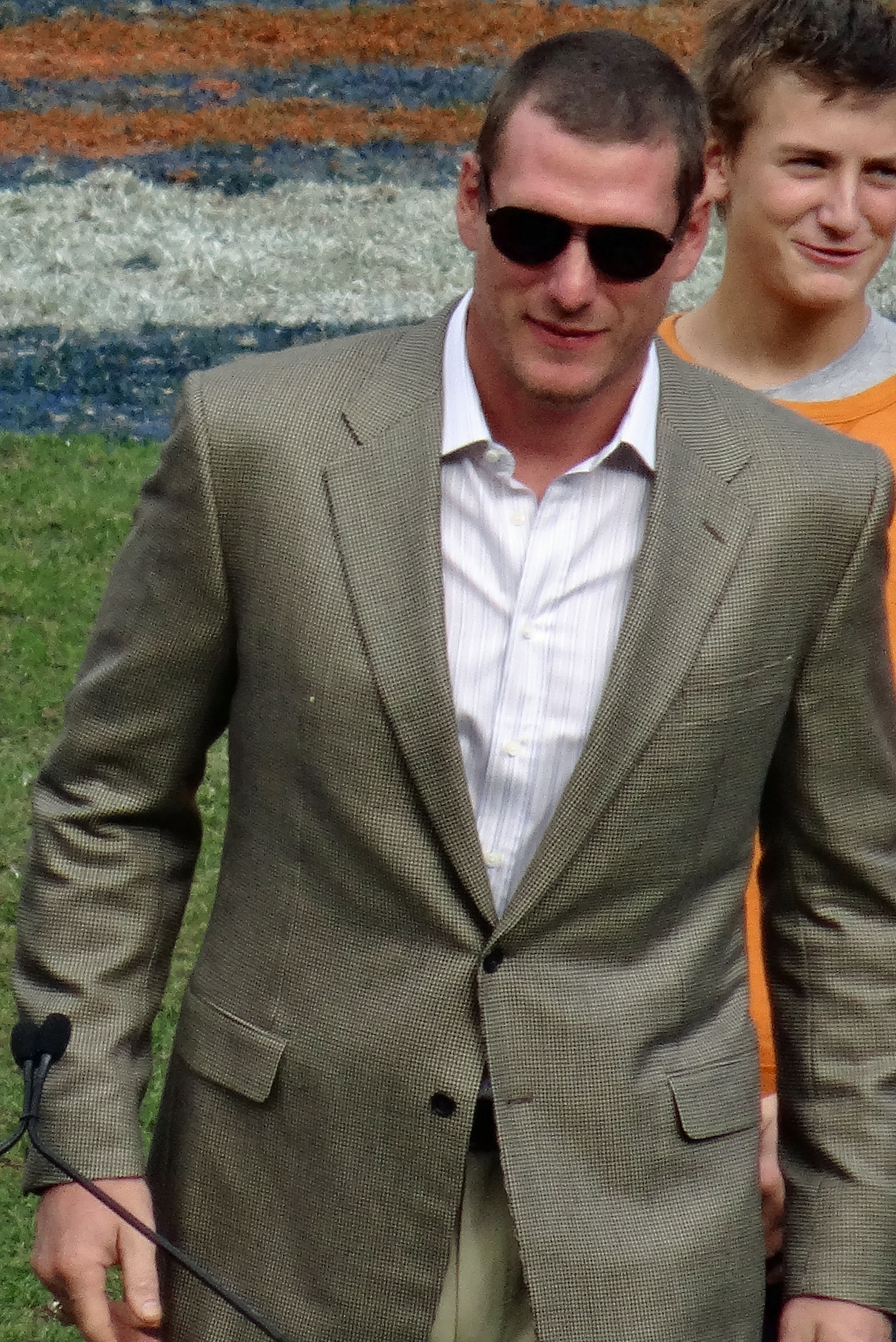
- Nalen at a Broncos home game against the Philadelphia Eagles in 2013

MIT Engineers
- Title: Offensive line coach

Personal information
- Born: May 13, 1971 (age 55); Boston, Massachusetts, U.S.
- Listed height: 6 ft 3 in (1.91 m)
- Listed weight: 286 lb (130 kg)

Career information
- Position: Center (No. 66)
- High school: Foxborough (MA)
- College: Boston College (1989–1993)
- NFL draft: 1994: 7th round, 218th overall pick

Career history

Playing
- Denver Broncos (1994–2008)

Coaching
- MIT (2023–present) Offensive line coach

Awards and highlights
- 2× Super Bowl champion (1997, 1998); 2× First-team All-Pro (2000, 2003); Second-team All-Pro (1999); 5× Pro Bowl (1997–2000, 2003); NFL Alumni Offensive Lineman of the Year (2003); Denver Broncos 50th Anniversary Team; Denver Broncos Ring of Fame; Third-team All-American (1993)

Career NFL statistics
- Games played: 194
- Games started: 188
- Stats at Pro Football Reference

Thomas Andrew Nalen (born May 13, 1971) is an American college football coach and former professional football center. He is the offensive line coach for the Massachusetts Institute of Technology, a position he has held since 2023. He played for the Denver Broncos of the National Football League (NFL) for his entire professional career. He played college football for the Boston College Eagles and was selected by the Broncos in the seventh round of the 1994 NFL draft. He was born in Boston and grew up in Foxborough, Massachusetts southwest of Boston.

== College career ==
Nalen was a three-year starting offensive lineman for Boston College, earning numerous honors that included third-team Associated Press All-America, second-team All-Big East and first-team ECAC. He redshirted in 1989, before serving as backup center and then starting center for the last three games in 1990. He started every game from 1991 to 1993. Nalen closed out his college career with appearances in the East–West Shrine and Senior Bowl games. In 1993, Nalen was an All-American honorable mention and All-Big East second-team pick by The Poor Man’s Guide to the NFL Draft. That year, Boston College ranked fourth in the nation in total offense (506.4 yards per game). Nalen's blocking was a key factor in the Eagles' 41–39 upset win over Notre Dame in South Bend, Indiana. In 2009, Nalen was inducted into the Boston College Varsity Club Hall of Fame.

== Professional career ==
Pre-draft measurables
Height	Weight	Arm length	Hand span	40-yard dash	10-yard split	20-yard split	20-yard shuttle	Vertical jump	Broad jump	Bench press
6 ft 2 7/8 in (1.90 m)	280 lb (127 kg)	33 1/8 in (0.84 m)	9 1/2 in (0.24 m)	5.02 s	1.79 s	2.96 s	4.59 s	28.0 in (0.71 m)	8 ft 6 in (2.59 m)	20 reps
All values from NFL Combine

Nalen was drafted by the Denver Broncos with the 218th overall pick in the seventh round of the 1994 NFL draft and played primarily at center. He won two Super Bowls as a member of the Broncos and played in five Pro Bowls. Six different running backs have had 1,000-yard rushing seasons behind Nalen and the Broncos' offensive line.

On January 6, 2009, Nalen retired from professional football after spending his entire career playing for the Denver Broncos. He was the last remaining player from the Broncos' Super Bowl titles in the late 1990s.

In 2013, Nalen was named to the Broncos Ring of Fame.

== Coaching career ==
In spring 2023, Nalen began coaching the offensive line unit for the MIT football team.
