= Foxborough Regional Charter School =

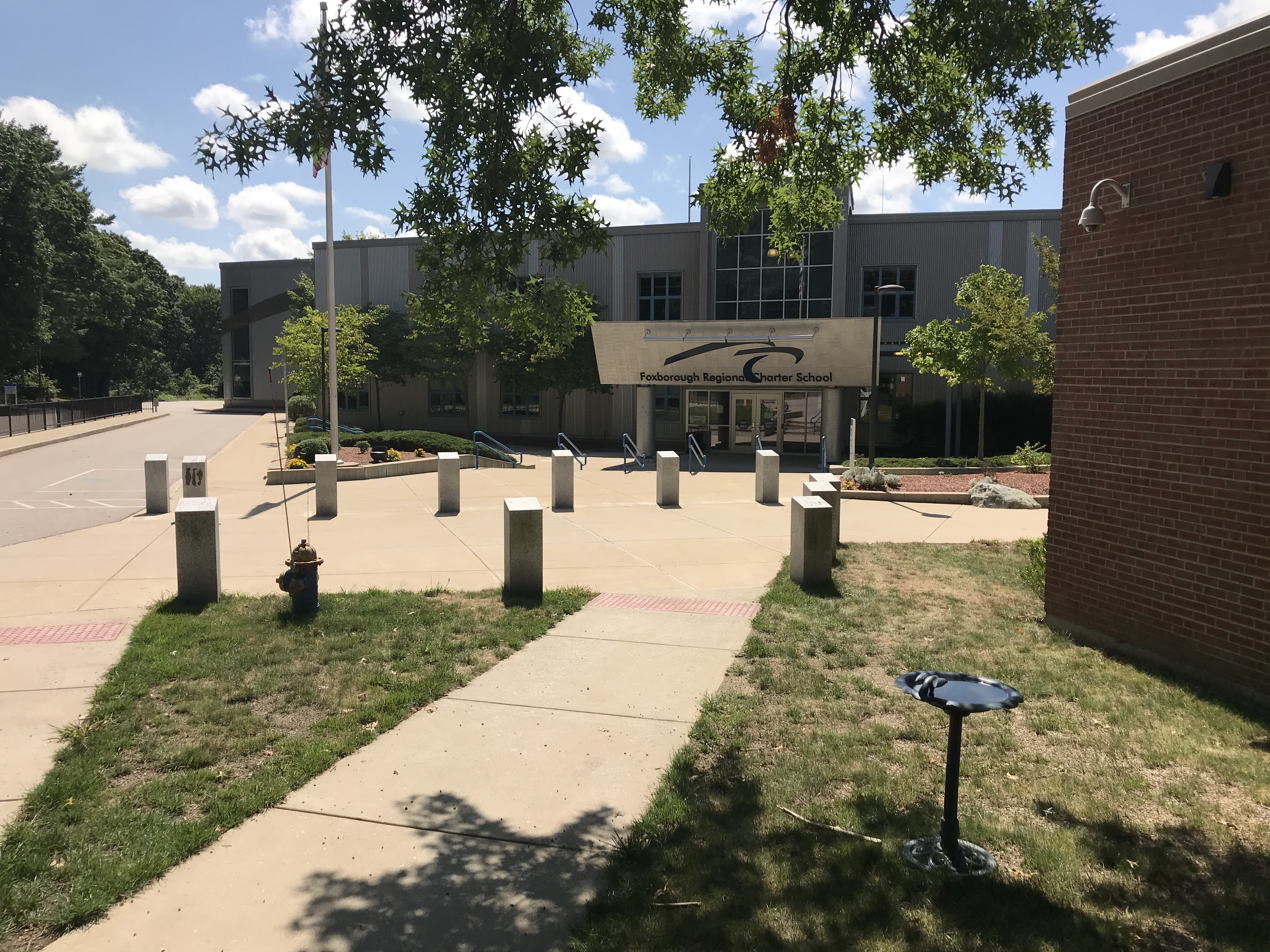
- Foxborough Regional Charter School

Location
- 131 Central Street; Foxborough, Massachusetts; United States; 42.0567°N 71.2455°W

Information
- Type: Charter
- Motto: Enter to learn, exit to lead!
- Established: 1998
- NCES School ID: 250005201250
- Faculty: 77.40 (on FTE basis)
- Grades: K to 12
- Enrollment: 1,139 (2009–10)
- Student to teacher ratio: 14.72:1
- Colors: Navy blue, white, & khakis
- Mascot: Falcons
- Nickname: FRCS
- Website: http://www.foxboroughrcs.org

The Foxborough Regional Charter School is a college prep, K through 12, charter school located in Foxborough, Massachusetts, United States.

== History ==
Founded as the SABIS Foxborough Regional School, a member of the SABIS international network of private charter schools, Foxborough Regional Charter School, or FRCS, opened at the start of the 1998 school year with 582 students in grades kindergarten through eighth. The former Robinson Hill Elementary stood here, which opened in 1955 and closed in the early 1980's. To accommodate their growing student population's need for a practical cafeteria and gym, the school built a cafetorium in 1999, which served as a gymnasium during gym class, and a cafeteria during lunch hours. In 2000, a new wing was built to allow for more elementary students. In 2001 a temporary, six-classroom modular building was installed for the middle school students. In 2010, a house on Route 140, adjacent to the school's front entrance, was bulldozed to make way for a set of modular buildings that were used by the high school. In January 2012, a new $16,000,000 facility was completed and now holds the middle and high school students. After the expansion, the modular buildings around the campus were eventually removed during the summer of 2012. The former middle school classrooms were converted into elementary school rooms.

FRCS split from SABIS in 2007 due to conflicts between SABIS' proprietary curriculum and Massachusetts' guidelines for charter schools.
