= Foxborough Public Schools =

School district in Massachusetts, United States

Foxborough Public Schools is the public school district serving Foxborough, in Norfolk County, Massachusetts. As of October 2018 it enrolled 2590 students.

== Schools ==
Foxborough Public Schools operates five schools: 3 elementary schools (2 that are K-4 and 1 that is PreK-4), a middle school (5-8) and a high school (9-12).

- Burrell Elementary School is a PreK-4 Elementary School enrolling 311 students as of 2018. Headed by Michele McCarthy, the Burrell Elementary School is the 2nd largest elementary school in the Foxborough Public Schools system and the 4th largest school overall in the Foxborough Public Schools system by number of students enrolled. The school has a cafeteria with full kitchen services, an auditorium, a gymnasium (all 3 are separate from each other) and a library with a wide selection of books. There are 2 playgrounds, one for 1st and 2nd graders and one for 3rd and 4th graders. There are fields in back (one baseball diamond and one softball field) and woods with trails that are only used when permitted by faculty.
- Taylor Elementary School is a K-4 Elementary School enrolling 224 students as of 2018. Headed by Peter Regan, the Taylor Elementary School is the smallest elementary school and the smallest school overall in the Foxborough Public Schools system by number of students enrolled. The school boasts a cafeteria with full kitchen services that is separate from the 1/2 gym and 1/2 auditorium. In an interesting design (some may say flaw), some classrooms are on the perimeter of the gym with doors out to the gym instead of the hallway. The Taylor has one playground with basketball courts.
- Igo Elementary School is a K-4 Elementary School enrolling 369 students as of 2018. Headed by Michael Stanton, the Igo Elementary School is the largest elementary school in the Foxborough Public Schools system and the 3rd largest school overall in the Foxborough Public Schools system by total number of students. The school boasts a cafeteria with full kitchen services, a gymnasium and an auditorium (all separate) plus a playground with acres of field space. The Igo Elementary School building used to house Foxborough High School as etched into stone on the schools exterior walls.
- John J. Ahern Middle School (commonly referred to as Ahern Middle School or "The Ahern") is a 5-8 Middle School enrolling 842 students as of 2018. Headed by Kerryn Frazier, the Ahern Middle School boasts a cafeteria with full kitchen services, 2 gymnasiums with locker rooms, a 1/4-mile track with football field, an auditorium with sound and lighting equipment, a TV Studio used by the Ahern Broadcasting Club, smart boards or projectors in every classroom and a large library with a classroom for lessons taught in the library. The Ahern Middle School is the only middle school in the Foxborough Public Schools system and the largest school in the Foxborough Public Schools system as of 2014 based on total students enrolled. The Ahern Middle School is the newest building in the Foxborough Public Schools system, given a massive addition and re-model completed in 2000. The addition included the current 6th grade, 7th grade and 8th grade wings and a new gymnasium. New in 2013, most of the school was outfitted with wireless internet for students and faculty on top of the 8 computer labs and the at least 2 computers in every classroom.
- Foxborough High School is a 9-12 High School enrolling 813 students as of 2018. Headed by Principal James Donovan and Assistant Principal Joseph Scozzaro, Foxborough High School boasts a cafeteria with full kitchen services, a newly renovated gymnasium with locker room facilities, an auditorium, a new Turf Football Field, Soccer Fields, Baseball Fields, Frisbee Golf Course, parking for faculty and students and classrooms with a wide range of amenities (some science classes have laboratory spaces). Foxborough High School is the only high school in the Foxborough Public Schools system and is the second largest school in the Foxborough Public Schools system by total number of students enrolled. 90% of graduates go on to education programs after graduating, 75% to 4 year college and university programs and 15% to 2 year college and community college programs. On top of that many go on to more programs after graduation from those programs (medical school, law school etc.).

== Demographics ==
As of 2021, the racial breakdown of students enrolled in Foxborough Public Schools is 78.4% White, 6.3% African American/Black, 6.8% Hispanic, 4.7% Asian, 0.1% Native Hawaiian or Pacific Islander, 0.4% American Indian or Alaskan Native, and 3.2% Mixed Race (non-hispanic). 34.9% of students enrolled have high needs, and 20.2% of students have disabilities.

== Administration and Funding ==
Foxborough Public Schools is headed by Superintendent Amy Berdos and a school committee of 5 members: Rob Canfield (Chair), Tina Belanger (Vice Chair), Katie Adair, Beverly Lord and Stephen Udden. Foxborough Public Schools is funded by the Town of Foxborough and the Commonwealth of Massachusetts. Foxborough Public Schools uses the Common Core State Standard and currently participates in the MCAS Assessment (Massachusetts Comprehensive Assessment System).

== Mascot and Teams ==
Foxborough High School has many sports teams that are all represented by the mascot the Warrior. Foxborough High School is the Home of the Foxboro Warriors. The school colors are Navy Blue, Vegas Gold and White. Foxboro High School is in the Hockomock League. Teams offered by Foxborough High School are: Golf, Baseball (V/FR,) Baseball (JV), Boys Basketball (V/JV/F), Boys Lacrosse (V/JV), Boys Soccer (V / JV), Boys Tennis, Cheering, Cross Country Field Hockey (V / JV), Football (V), Football (JV), Football (F), Girls Basketball (V/JV/F), Girls Lacrosse (V/JV), Girls Soccer (V / JV), Girls Soccer (F), Girls Tennis, Ice Hockey, Middle School Basketball, Softball (V/JV), Spring Track, Swimming, Volleyball (JV / V / F), Winter Track and Wrestling.
