= Seth Williams (USMC) =

U.S. Marine Corps Major General and Quartermaster of the Marine Corps during World War II

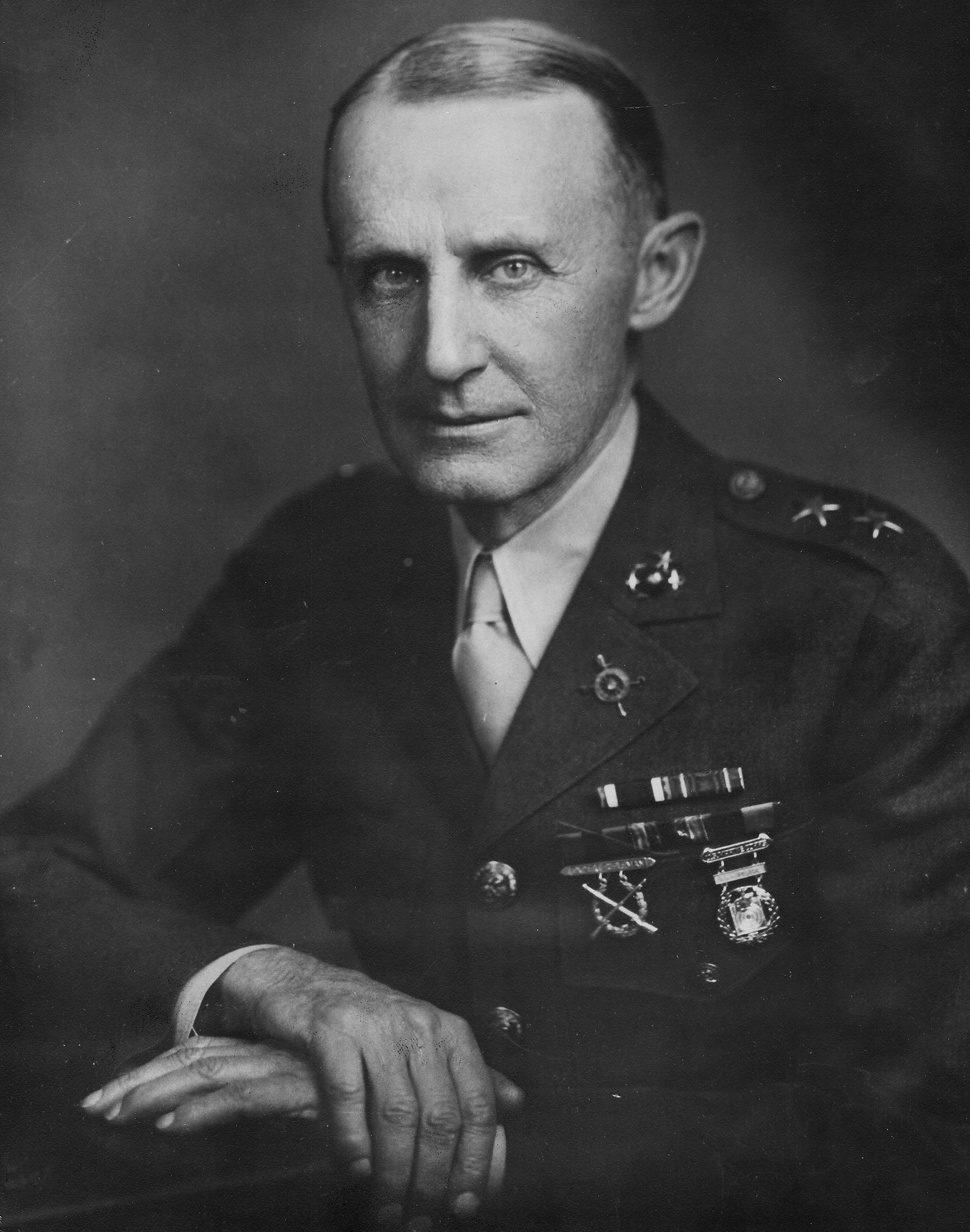
- Major general Seth Williams, USMC
- Born: January 19, 1880; Foxborough, Massachusetts, U.S.
- Died: July 29, 1963 (aged 83); Washington, D.C., U.S.
- Burial place: Arlington National Cemetery
- Military career
- Allegiance: United States of America
- Branch: United States Marine Corps
- Service years: 1903–1944
- Rank: Major general
- Service number: 0-1066
- Commands: Quartermaster of the Marine Corps; Depot of Supplies, San Francisco; Depot of Supplies, Philadelphia
- Conflicts: Moro Rebellion; World War I Rhineland Occupation; Yangtze Patrol; World War II
- Awards: Legion of Merit

Seth Williams (January 19, 1880 – July 29, 1963) was an officer of the United States Marine Corps with the rank of major general, who served at Headquarters Marine Corps as Quartermaster General of the United States Marine Corps during the years 1937–1944.

Williams is most noted for his efforts during the construction of Marine Barracks, Quantico following the United States entry into World War I and for the construction of several military training centers at the beginning of World War II: Camp Lejeune, North Carolina; Camp Pendleton, California and Camp Elliott.

== Early career ==
Seth Williams was born on January 19, 1880, in Foxborough, Massachusetts, as the son of Jarvis and Elizabeth Williams. Following high school, he entered the Norwich University in Northfield, Vermont, in 1899. During his time at the university, Williams was leading the corps of cadets in his senior year as the cadet major. He was also a member of Vermont National Guard, where he rose to the rank of first lieutenant.

He graduated in May 1903 with Bachelor of Science degree in civil engineering and entered the Marine Corps service. Williams was commissioned second lieutenant on June 30, 1903, and ordered to the School of Application at Annapolis, Maryland, for basic officer training. Upon completion of the school in April 1904, he was promoted to first lieutenant and ordered for expeditionary duty to the Philippines.

Williams served with 1st Marine Brigade under Colonel William P. Biddle at Olongapo and participated in the combat operations against Moros until June 1907. Following his return, Williams was attached to the Marine barracks at Boston Navy Yard, Massachusetts where he served until August 1908. He was promoted to captain in May 1908 and accepted appointment to the Quartermaster Branch. Williams was subsequently ordered to the Marine barracks at Norfolk Navy Yard and served there as post quartermaster until he was transferred to the same capacity at Marine Barracks, Puget Sound Navy Yard in December 1910.

In February 1913, Williams sailed back to the Philippines and served again with 1st Marine Brigade and shortly thereafter at Guam. He returned to the United States in July 1915 and assumed duty as Officer-in-Charge, Purchasing Division, Office of the Quartermaster at the Headquarters Marine Corps. While in this capacity, he was promoted to major in October 1916.

=== Quantico ===
Following the declaration of War on Germany on April 2, 1917, Commandant of the Marine Corps, George Barnett, appointed a board with a purpose of recommending a site in the vicinity of Washington, D.C. as a temporary training camp and maneuver field with target range for the Marine Corps. Colonel Charles A. Doyen, Lieutenant Colonel George Van Orden, and Captain Seth Williams made up the board.

After a tour in the vicinity of Washington, D.C., where several sites were checked, but none of them found suitable for the training camp, the board found an area near Potomac River at Quantico, Virginia. Commandant and several other senior Marine officers visited the site and approved the construction of the Training camp at Quantico. Williams was put in charge of overseeing all construction and development at Quantico and he could now use his Civil Engineering degree from Norwich. Marine Barracks Quantico opened its gates in mid-May 1917 and began with the training of Marines heading for France (in particular 5th and 6th Marine Regiments).

For his efforts during the planning and construction of the Marine Barracks, Quantico, Williams received a special letter of commendation by the Secretary of the Navy, Josephus Daniels.

=== Duty in France ===
Williams was subsequently appointed a Marine Corps representative on the War Industries Board, which was responsible for the coordination of the purchase of war supplies between the War Department and the Navy Department. He remained in that capacity until September 1918, when he embarked for France as the Regimental Quartermaster, 13th Marine Regiment under Colonel Douglas C. McDougal.

The regiment arrived to Brest and was stationed in Base Section No. 2 near Bordeaux and later near Tours. Williams saw no combat duty and later participated in the Occupation of the Rhineland until he was ordered back to the United States in August 1919.

== Interwar period ==
Following his return stateside, Williams served with the Quartermaster's Department at Headquarters Marine Corps until he was ordered to China in September 1921. He served as quartermaster of the Marine detachment at American Legation Guard in Peking until his departure in October 1923.

Williams was promoted to lieutenant colonel shortly after his arrival home and assumed duty as quartermaster with the headquarters, Department of the Pacific in San Francisco. While in this capacity, he served under Major General Wendell C. Neville and was responsible for the organization and planning of logistics for the Marine Corps Units on the West Coast, 14th Naval District (Hawaii and outlying Pacific islands), 16th Naval District (the Philippines), 17th Naval District (Alaska and Aleutian Islands) and Marine Forces in Northern China (China Marines).

He left San Francisco in December 1926 and moved to Marine Barracks, Parris Island, South Carolina, where he assumed duty as post quartermaster under Brigadier General Harry Lee.

Williams was transferred to Philadelphia in September 1928 and assumed command of local Depot of Supplies. While in this assignment, he was responsible for the production of military hardware and housekeeping supplies included hat ornaments, mosquito nets, mess pans, helmets, articles of uniforms, foot lockers, buckets, stoves, tent poles, bunks, etc. He was promoted to colonel in July 1931.

== World War II ==
In Juley 1936, Williams was transferred to the Headquarters Marine Corps in Washington, D.C., and served as assistant quartermaster of the Marine Corps and deputy to Major General Hugh L. Matthews. While in this assignment, he also held additional duty as purchasing officer of the Haitian Constabulary, Garde d'Haïti and received Haitian Distinguished Service Medal and Diploma for his service.

He relieved Matthews as Quartermaster General on December 1, 1937, and assumed responsibility for the whole organization of supply of the Marine Corps. Williams was also responsible for the support of development, production, acquisition, and sustainment of general supply, Mortuary Affairs, subsistences, petroleum and water, material and distribution management during peace and war to provide combat power to the U.S. Marine Corps units.

Shortly before the United States entry into World War II, Williams supervised the gigantic building program resulting in construction of vast new training centers at Camp Lejeune, North Carolina; Camp Pendleton, California and Camp Elliott also in California. He was promoted to the rank of major general in April 1942. In addition to his previous efforts in the construction of new training camps, Williams also held responsibility of transportation of troops to combat zones, and the development of supply and distribution depots in the South and Central Pacific areas.

Williams served in this capacity throughout World War II and finally was relieved by Major General William P. T. Hill on February 1, 1944. For his service as quartermaster of the Marine Corps, he was decorated with the Legion of Merit by the Secretary of the Navy, Frank Knox.

General Williams was recalled to active duty in May 1946 and assumed duty as a member of Marine Corps Retirement Board together with generals Holland Smith, Roy S. Geiger, Harry Schmidt, Vice Admiral Richard L. Conolly and Colonel Lionel C. Goudeau as Recorder. His job was to consider the retirement of officers in the regular Marine Corps in the rank of brigadier general.

Following his retirement, Williams resided at Army and Navy Club Building in Washington, D.C., and died there on July 29, 1963. He is buried at Arlington National Cemetery together with his wife Mary Baily Williams. Seth Williams Boulevard on Camp Lejune is named in his honor.

== Decorations ==
Here is the ribbon bar of Major General Seth Williams:

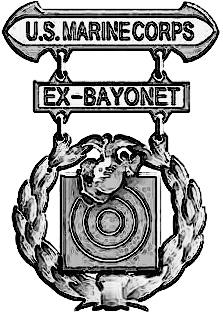

1st Row	Legion of Merit	Marine Corps Expeditionary Medal with one star	World War I Victory Medal with two battle clasps	Army of Occupation of Germany Medal
2nd Row	American Defense Service Medal	American Campaign Medal	World War II Victory Medal	Haitian Distinguished Service Medal and Diploma

== See also ==
- Camp Lejeune
- Camp Pendleton

Military offices
Preceded by Hugh L. Matthews	Quartermaster General of the United States Marine Corps; December 1, 1937 – February 1, 1944	Succeeded by William P. T. Hill
