= Anna Conway =

American painter

- Born: 1973; Durango, Colorado, United States
- Education: Columbia University, Cooper Union
- Known for: Painting
- Awards: Guggenheim Fellowship, Pollock-Krasner Foundation, American Academy of Arts and Letters
- Website: Anna Conway

Anna Conway (born 1973) is an American visual artist based in New York City and known for enigmatic oil paintings that depict uneasy, absurdist moments descending on isolated, ordinary individuals. She combines a style identified as precise and methodical with detailed observation, "an air of surrealist suspension," and a narrative sense that critics characterize as elusive, metaphysical and "imbued with cinematic suggestion." Conway has exhibited nationally and internationally, including at MoMA PS1, the American Academy of Arts and Letters, Kemper Museum of Contemporary Art, University Art Museum at Albany, Fralin Museum of Art, and Collezione Maramotti (Italy), among other venues. She has been recognized with a Guggenheim Fellowship (2014), two Pollock-Krasner Foundation Awards (2011, 2005), and the American Academy of Arts and Letters William L. Metcalf Award (2008).

== Early life and career ==
Anna Conway, Haniwa, oil on linen, 36" x 48", 2017.

Conway was born in Durango, Colorado in 1973 and grew up in Foxborough, Massachusetts. She studied art in New York City, earning a BFA from Cooper Union (1997) and an MFA from Columbia University (2002). After graduating, she rented a studio in Brooklyn and gained early recognition for shows in New York at Artemis Greenberg Van Doren and Guild and Greyshkul in 2004, and at MoMA PS1 and Phillips de Pury & Company in 2005. In subsequent years, she has had solo exhibitions at Fergus McCaffrey, American Contemporary and Guild & Greyshkul (all New York City) and Collezione Maramotti. In addition to her painting practice, Conway has taught at Cooper Union, Columbia University, Parsons School of Design, and Brooklyn College. She lives and works in New York City.

== Work and reception ==
Conway's art has been featured in Artforum, Art in America, Flash Art, Frieze, The New York Times, Hyperallergic, and New American Paintings, among many publications. In a 2007 review, The New Yorker compared her work to the "fantastic, alienating styles of Magritte, Gregory Crewdson and Jeff Wall, with strange tableaux suggesting both religious miracles translated into the everyday and "the apocalypse rendered in miniature," rather than cinemaplex, scale. These paintings often present workaday men reduced to tiny figures in quietly mysterious, absurd scenes suggesting futility, inscrutable inner states and back stories, and a sense of suburban normalcy gone wrong.

Critics such as Hyperallergic's Seph Rodney suggest that Conway's work in the later 2010s carries a more pervasive, foreboding quiet, reflecting both a dystopian fear and desire for the scarcity of humanity, concerns about sustainability and social inequality, and the heightened tension of a more ominous, paranoid era. Artforum critic Kate Sutton writes that Conway's "pristine execution echoes the would-be flawlessness of her settings," which she subtly intrudes upon with seemingly accidental figures and evocations of the past suggesting loss amid sleek, contemporary modernism (e.g., Haniwa, 2017). Rachel Churner describes these paintings as the visual equivalents of spy novels "marked by the abundance and clarity of their details" and the thrill of deciphering what is significant and what is merely mundane.
