= William P. T. Hill =

United States Marine Corps general

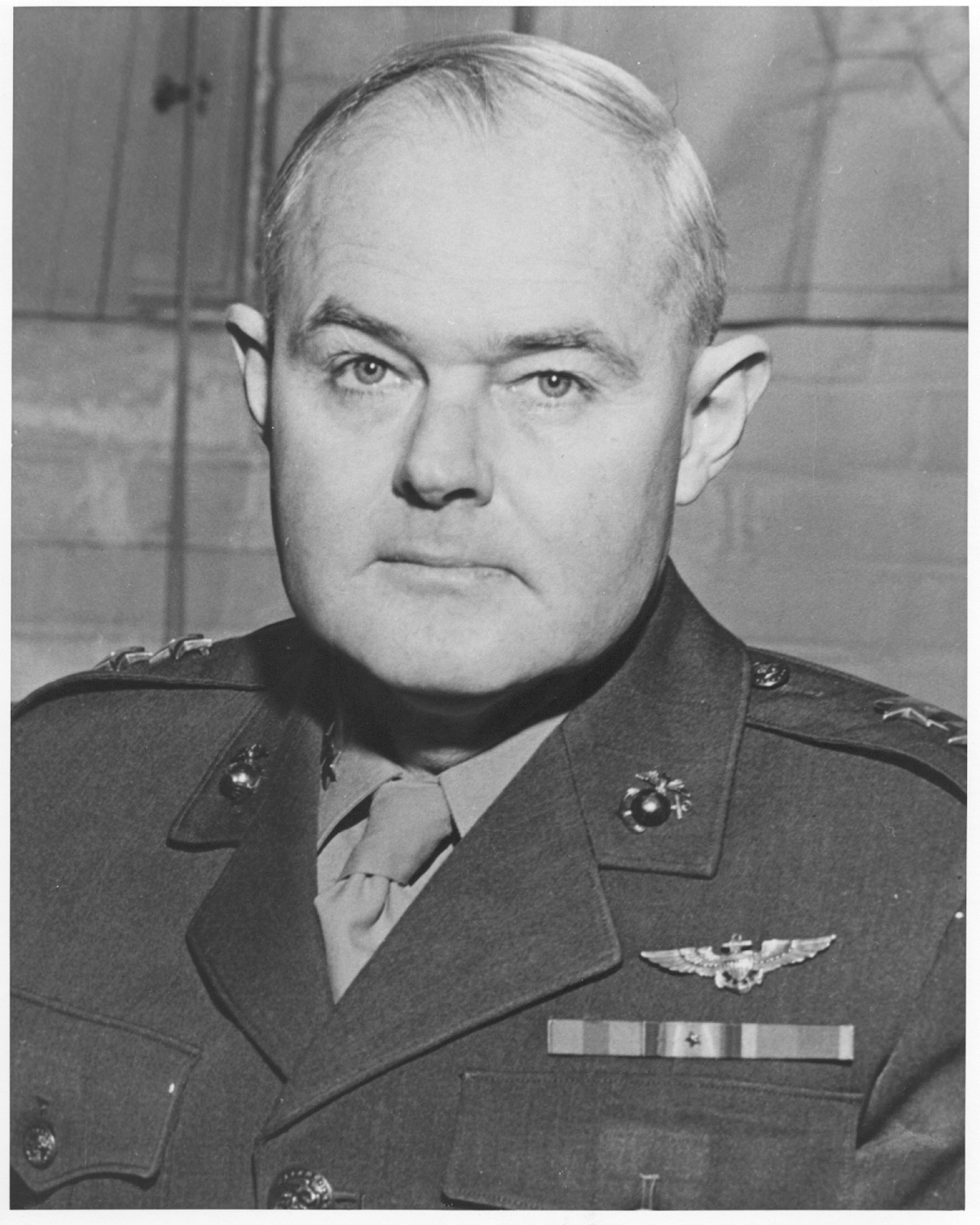
- Born: February 22, 1895; Vinita, Oklahoma
- Died: December 6, 1965 (aged 70); Bethesda Naval Hospital, U.S.
- Burial place: Arlington National Cemetery
- Alma mater: Western Military Academy; University of Oklahoma
- Military career
- Allegiance: United States of America
- Branch: United States Marine Corps
- Service years: 1917–1955
- Rank: Major general
- Commands: Camp Lejeune
- Conflicts: World War I World War II
- Awards: Navy Distinguished Service Medal

William Pendleton Thompson Hill (February 22, 1895 – December 6, 1965) was a United States Marine Corps major general who served as Quartermaster General of the Marine Corps from 1944 to 1955.

== Early life ==
Hill was born in Vinita, Oklahoma, and attended Kemper Military School. He later graduated from Western Military Academy in Alton, Illinois. After his graduation from the University of Oklahoma, he entered active duty as a second lieutenant in the Marine Corps on 12 July 1917.

== Military career ==
After attending flight school at the Naval Coastal Air Station in Cape May, New Jersey, Hill served as one of the Marine Corps' first aviators. In 1918, he served as a pilot with the 1st Marine Aeronautic Company, flying seaplane patrols in the Azores.

In 1920, Hill was assigned as a member of the Naval Alaskan Coal Commission, where he served as a geologist during the survey of Alaskan coal fields. As a captain, he commanded a company assigned to the American Legation in Peking, China. While there, he participated in Doctor Roy Chapman Andrews' third expedition to the Gobi Desert in Mongolia, as the expedition topographer.

In 1933, Hill was posted overseas to Haiti, where he served as the quartermaster and paymaster director for the Garde d'Haiti.

During World War II, Hill was initially assigned as the liaison officer during the construction of Camp Lejeune, and briefly served as camp commander during 1941.

In 1943, Hill was reassigned to Marine Corps headquarters for duty in the Quartermaster Department, becoming quartermaster general on 1 February 1944, a position he held until his retirement in 1955. Victor Krulak, in First to Fight, described Hill as the "classic representative of the Quartermaster's tradition of fierce frugality....thrift was his watchword...

Hill was awarded the Navy Distinguished Service Medal his "exceptionally meritorious and distinguished service in positions of great responsibility to the Government of the United States" from 8 September 1939 to 1947, including for his role in the design of the Marine Corps base at Camp Lejeune, North Carolina: "He was entirely and almost solely responsible for the detailed layout of the establishment."

Hill died on December 6, 1965, in Bethesda Naval Hospital at the age of 70. He is buried in Arlington National Cemetery

== Decorations ==
Major General Hill's ribbon bar:

Naval Aviator Badge
1st Row	Navy Distinguished Service Medal		Navy Commendation Medal	Marine Corps Expeditionary Medal with service star
2nd Row	World War I Victory Medal with aviation clasp	American Defense Service Medal	American Campaign Medal	Asiatic-Pacific Campaign Medal with one service star
3rd Row	World War II Victory Medal	National Defense Service Medal	Haitian Distinguished Service Medal and Diploma	Commander of the Order of Orange-Nassau with swords (Netherlands)

== W.P.T. Hill Award ==
The W.P.T. Hill Award was established in 1985 to improve food service operation and recognize the best messes in the Marine Corps. Competitors are judged on areas such as operations, sanitation, taste and quality of food.
