= Marine Corps Supply Activity =

Historic place in Pennsylvania, United States

- U.S. National Register of Historic Places
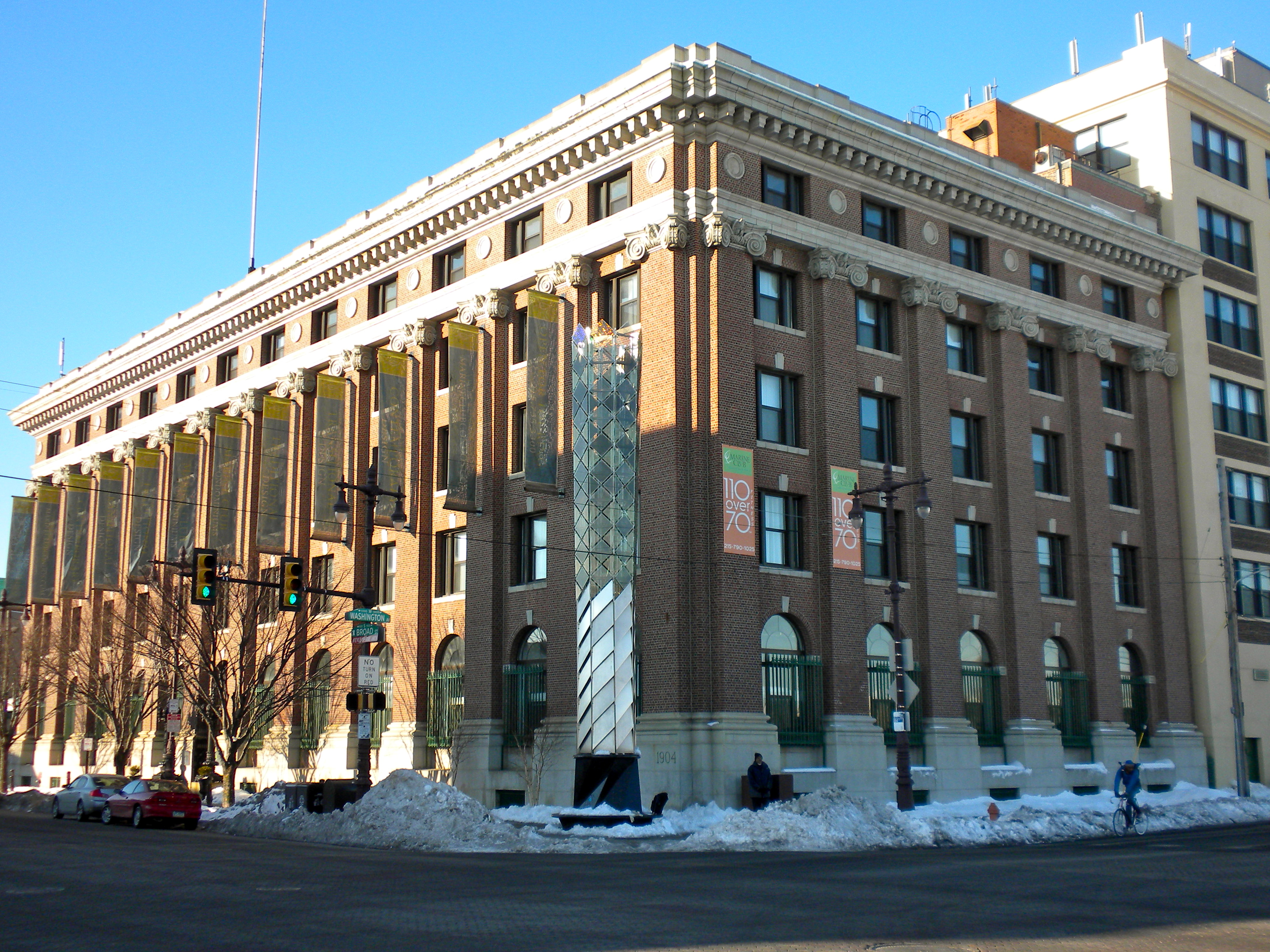
- (February 2010)

- Location within Philadelphia Location within Pennsylvania Location within the United States
- Location: 1100 S. Broad St. Philadelphia, Pennsylvania
- Coordinates: 39°56′15″N 75°10′4″W
- Area: 1 acre (0.40 ha)
- Built: 1904, 1908
- Architectural style: Classical Revival
- NRHP reference No.: 75001662
- Added to NRHP: August 6, 1975

The Marine Corps Supply Activity, also known as the Quartermaster's Depot, U.S. Marine Corps, is an historic office building and warehouse in the Point Breeze neighborhood of South Philadelphia in Philadelphia, Pennsylvania, United States.

The building was added to the National Register of Historic Places in 1975. As of 2010, it has been used as residential condominiums under the name "Marine Club".

== History and architectural features ==
Built by the Marine Corps in two sections in 1904 and in 1908, this building is a five-story, red brick, stone, and concrete building that was designed in the Classical Revival style. It features pilasters with Ionic order capitals.

During World War II, the build served as headquarters of Depot of Supplies under Brigadier General Maurice C. Gregory and was responsible for the production of military hardware and housekeeping supplies included hat ornaments, mosquito nets, mess pans, helmets, articles of uniforms, foot lockers, buckets, stoves, tent poles, bunks, etc.

The building was added to the National Register of Historic Places in 1975. It has been used as residential condominiums since 2010, under the name "Marine Club".
