= Bay Circuit Trail =

Long-distance hiking trail in the United States

Coordinates: 42°37′40.23″N 71°4′6.32″W

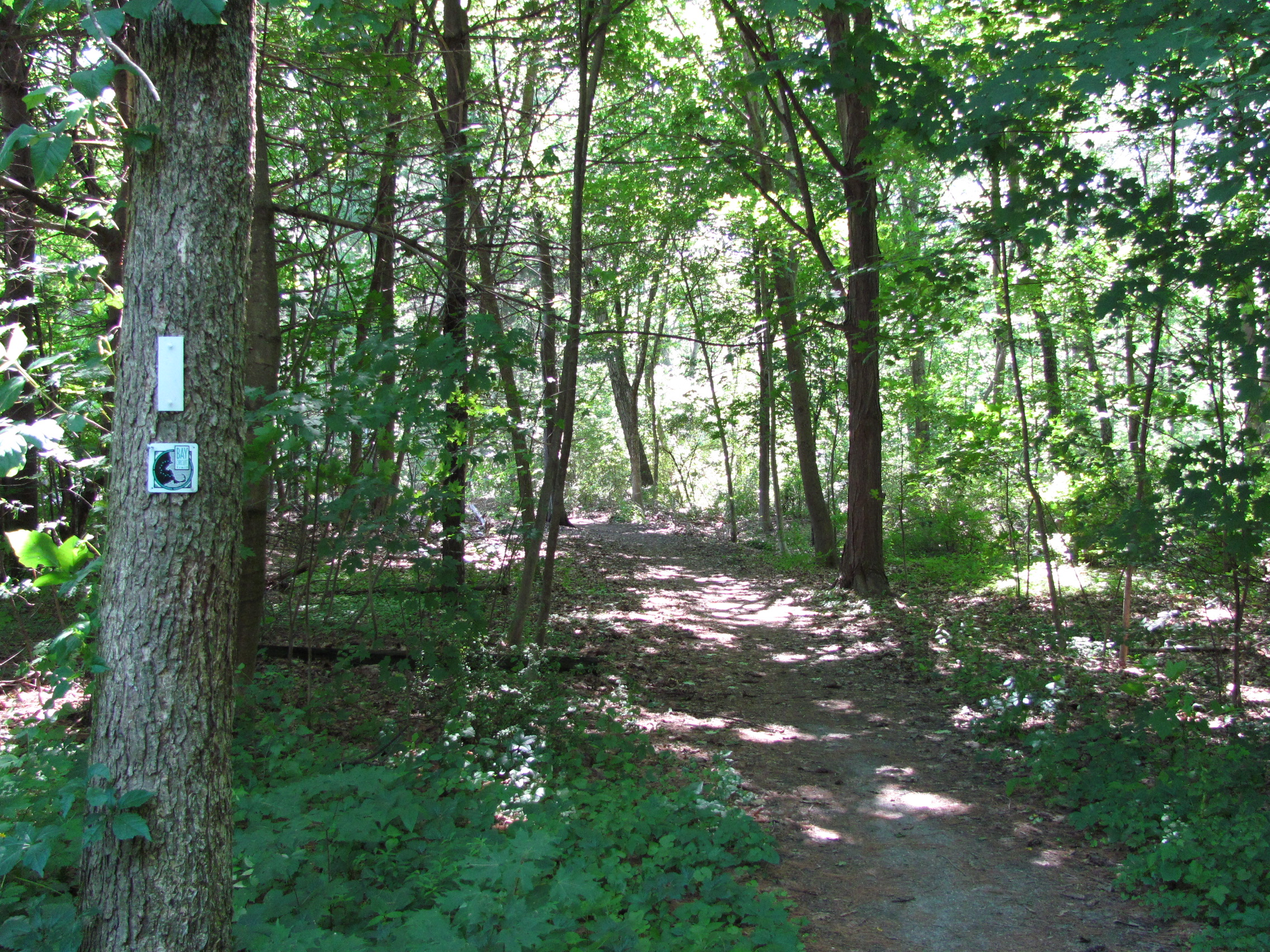
- At Monument Street in Concord
- Length: 200 mi (320 km)
- Location: Plymouth County, Middlesex County, eastern Worcester County, Bristol County and Essex County, Massachusetts
- Use: Primarily hiking.
- Highest point: Nobscot Hill, Framingham, Massachusetts, 602 ft (183 m)
- Lowest point: Sea level, north and south terminus
- Difficulty: easy with some moderately difficult sections
- Season: year round (may be ice or snow in winter)
- Hazards: deer ticks, poison ivy, road crossings
- Maintained by: Bay Circuit Alliance
- Website: baycircuit.org

The Bay Circuit Trail and Greenway or Bay Circuit is a Massachusetts rail trail and greenway connecting the outlying suburbs of Boston from Plum Island in Newburyport to Kingston Bay in Duxbury, a distance of 200 miles (320 km).

Landmarks include Henry David Thoreau's Walden Pond, Great Meadows National Wildlife Refuge, the Charles River, Massachusetts Audubon's Moose Hill Wildlife Sanctuary, Minute Man National Historical Park, Lowell National Historic Park, the Merrimack River, and Plum Island.

The Bay Circuit Trail connects to other long distance recreation trails, such as the Warner Trail. The Minuteman Bikeway provides a connection to downtown Boston with the Somerville Community Path. The East Coast Greenway will also connect downtown if it is completed as envisioned.

The Bay Circuit is open to hiking, trail running and picnicking, and in the winter, snowshoeing. Certain parts of the trail are suitable for bicycling, horseback riding and cross country skiing. Swimming, mountain biking, hunting, fishing, and car top boating are also permitted in some properties the trail passes through.

The Bay Circuit Trail is overseen by the Bay Circuit Alliance, a coalition of state, town, and federal agencies, nonprofit organizations, and individuals. The Bay Circuit Alliance is led by the Appalachian Mountain Club which is working to implement the vision of the Bay Circuit by closing the final gaps of the trail, recruiting and organizing volunteers, improving the trail experience through improved maintenance and signage, securing permanent protection for the trail corridor and the greenway, and encouraging the public to get out and explore the trail’s 230+ miles.

== Geography ==
The Bay Circuit forms a rough C-shaped arc between 15 miles (24 km) and 30 miles (48 km) north, west, and south of Boston. Although much of the trail follows a single route, several sections split in two and rejoin. The northern terminus of the trail is also divided: its northernmost section ends at Plum Island in Newburyport, and a southerly branch extends to the sea in the town of Ipswich.

The Bay Circuit passes through Plymouth County, Norfolk County, Middlesex County, eastern Worcester County, Bristol County and Essex County, Massachusetts.

=== Southern third ===
The southern third of the Bay Circuit begins at Kingston Bay, a part of Plymouth Bay, as a loop between Duxbury, Kingston, and Pembroke, then continues as primarily one route through Hanson, East Bridgewater, Bridgewater, West Bridgewater, Easton, and Sharon. Features along this route include Bay Farm (Massachusetts DCR), cranberry bogs, Silver Lake Sanctuary, the Central Greenbelt, Willow Brook Farm Preserve, Hanson Town Forest, Hockomock Swamp, Little Cedar Swamp, Bridgewater Iron Works Park, Lake Nippenicket, the Reverend James Keith Parsonage, West Bridgewater State Forest, Satucket River Conservation Area, Sachem Rock Farm, Borderland State Park, Moose Hill Wildlife Sanctuary, Hill Top Farm, Adams Farm, Great Cedar Swamp, The Pinnacle, and the Old Indian Trail.

=== Middle third ===
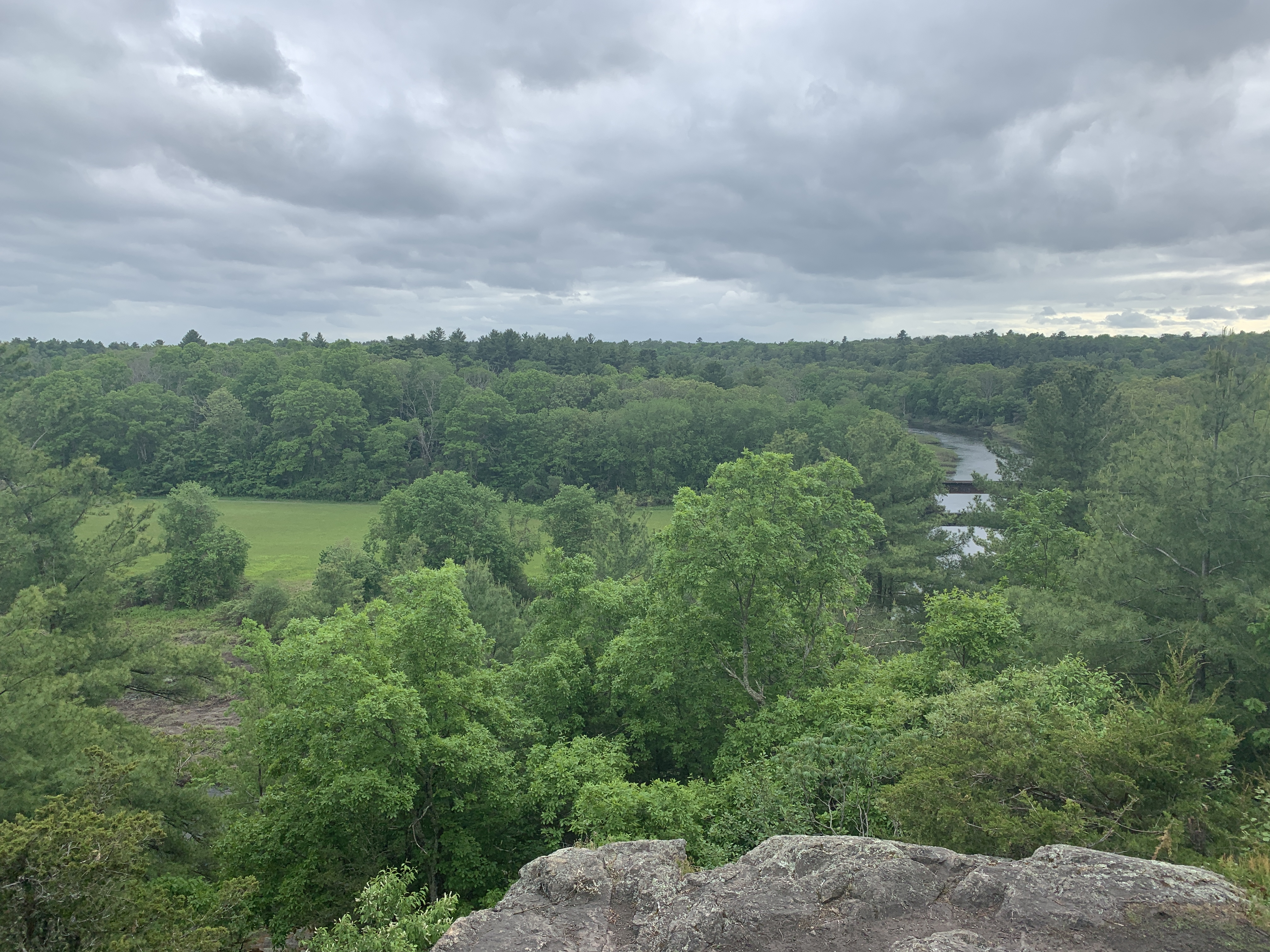
The view from King Phillip's Overlook, located along the Sherborn segment of the trail.

The middle third of the Bay Circuit passes through the towns of Walpole, Medfield, Sherborn, Ashland, Framingham, Southborough, Sudbury, Wayland, Lincoln, and Concord. Features along this route include Noon Hill, Medfield Rhododendrons, the Charles River, Rocky Woods, Fork Factory Brook, Little Farm Pond, Broadmoor Wildlife Sanctuary, Sherborn Town Forest, Rocky Narrows, Ashland Town Forest, Sudbury Reservoir, Callahan State Park, Nobscot Conservation Land, Turenne Wildlife Habitat, Garden in the Woods, Devil's Den, Heard Farm, Great Meadows National Wildlife Refuge, the Mass Central Rail Trail—Wayside, Mount Misery (Lincoln, Massachusetts), Round Hill, and Haynes Meadow. Smaller networks of interconnecting side trails are prevalent throughout.

=== Northern third ===
North of Concord, the Bay Circuit splits into two tracks. The eastern track passes through the towns of Bedford, Billerica, and Tewksbury while the western track passes through Acton, Carlisle, Westford, Chelmsford, Lowell, and Tewksbury. The two branches converge in Andover and continue through North Andover, Boxford, Georgetown, Rowley, and Ipswich before splitting again into two terminal routes. The southern route continues east through Hamilton to end at the in Ipswich while the northern route passes northeast through east Rowley, Newbury, and Newburyport ending at the Atlantic Ocean at Plum Island.

Features along this route include the Walden Pond State Reservation, Adams Woods, the DeCordova Museum, the Dana Museum, Flint's Pond conservation areas, Drumlin Farm, the Bruce Freeman Rail Trail, Minuteman National Historical Park, the Assabet River, Fawn Lake, Nashoba Brook, the Sudbury River, Lowell National Historic Park, the Merrimack River, Kerouac Park, Lowell Heritage State Park, Carlisle Pines State Park, Middlesex Canal, Wilderness Park, the Concord River, the Minuteman Bikeway, Indian Springs, Deer Jump Reservation, Harold Rafton Reservation, Haggetts Pond, Indian Ridge Reservation, Harold Parker State Forest, Ward Reservation, Boxford State Forest, Bald Hill Reservation, Phillips Wildlife Sanctuary, Pomp's Pond, Georgetown-Rowley State Forest, Cleaveland Farms State Forest, Willowdale State Forest, Bradley Palmer State Park, Appleton Farms, Prospect Hill, the Ipswich River, Castle Neck River, Castle Hill, Castle Neck, the Ipswich Lighthouse, William Forward Wildlife Management Area, Parker River National Wildlife Refuge, Old Town Hill, Joppa Flats Education Center, and Plum Island.
