= F. Gilbert Hills State Forest =

Protected area in Massachusetts, United States

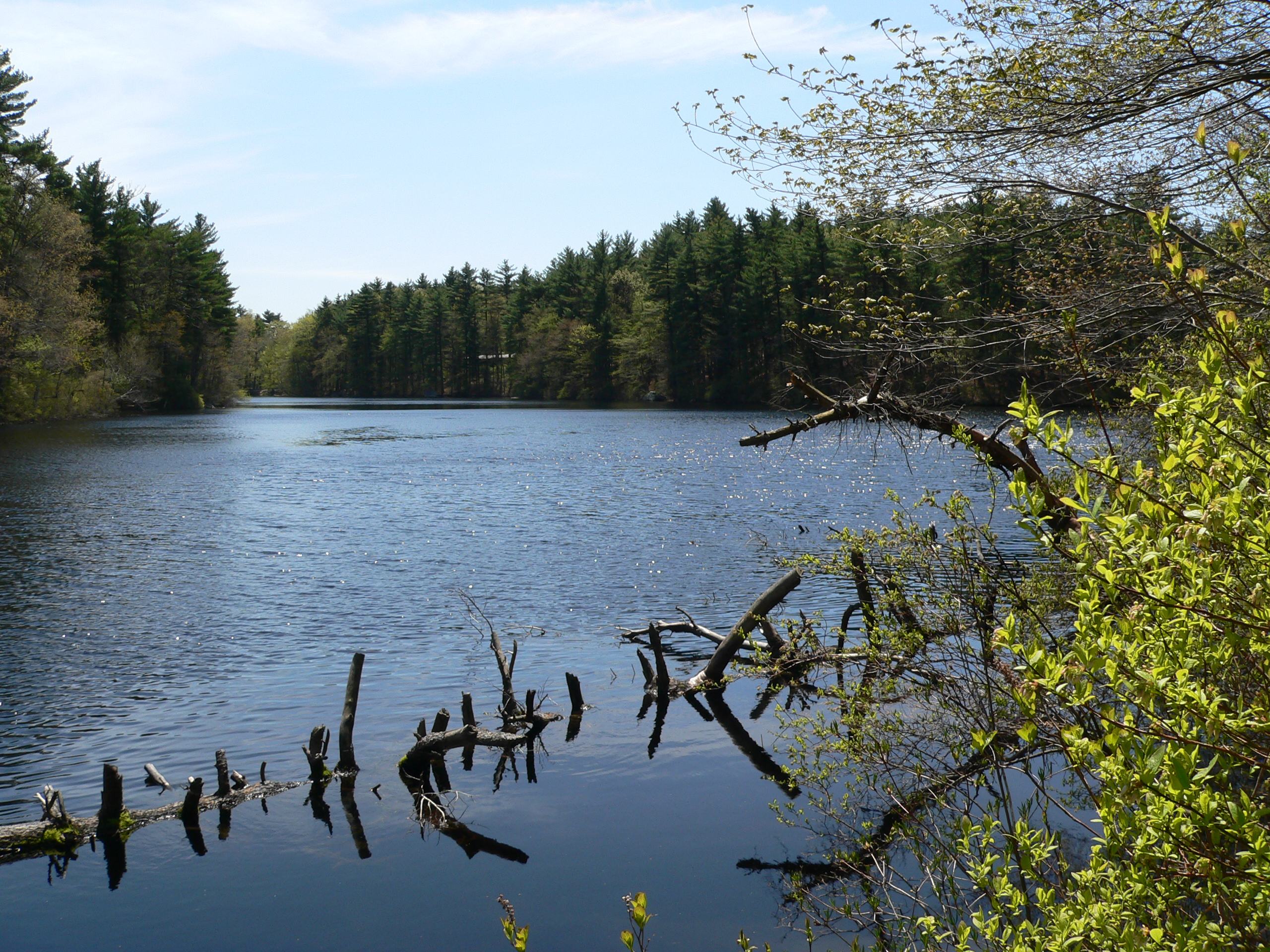
- Sunset Lake

- Location within Massachusetts Location within the United States
- Location: Foxborough and Wrentham, Massachusetts, United States
- Coordinates: 42°03′40″N 71°17′16″W
- Area: 1,030 acres (420 ha)
- Elevation: 443 ft (135 m)
- Administrator: Massachusetts Department of Conservation and Recreation
- Website: Official website

F. Gilbert Hills State Forest (previously known as Foxboro State Forest) is a pine and oak Massachusetts state forest located in the towns of Foxborough and Wrentham. The forest, which is managed by the Massachusetts Department of Conservation and Recreation, was named for a former State Forester and employee.

F. Gilbert Hills State Forest is adjacent to the Harold B. Clark Town Forest to its north, and is connected to Wrentham State Forest to its west. The "minimally developed" Franklin and Wrentham state forests are managed in conjunction with the Gilbert Hills property.

Contained on state forest land are some unique stone structures that some believe were made and used by the native Algonquin tribes prior to the town's founding.

== Activities and amenities ==
The forest has 23 miles (37 km) trails, including a section of the 30-mile (48 km) Warner Trail, for walking, hiking, mountain biking, horseback riding, cross-country skiing, and off-road vehicle use. It also offers accessible restrooms, picnicking, and restricted hunting.
