= Moose Hill Wildlife Sanctuary =

Wildlife sanctuary in Sharon, Massachusetts

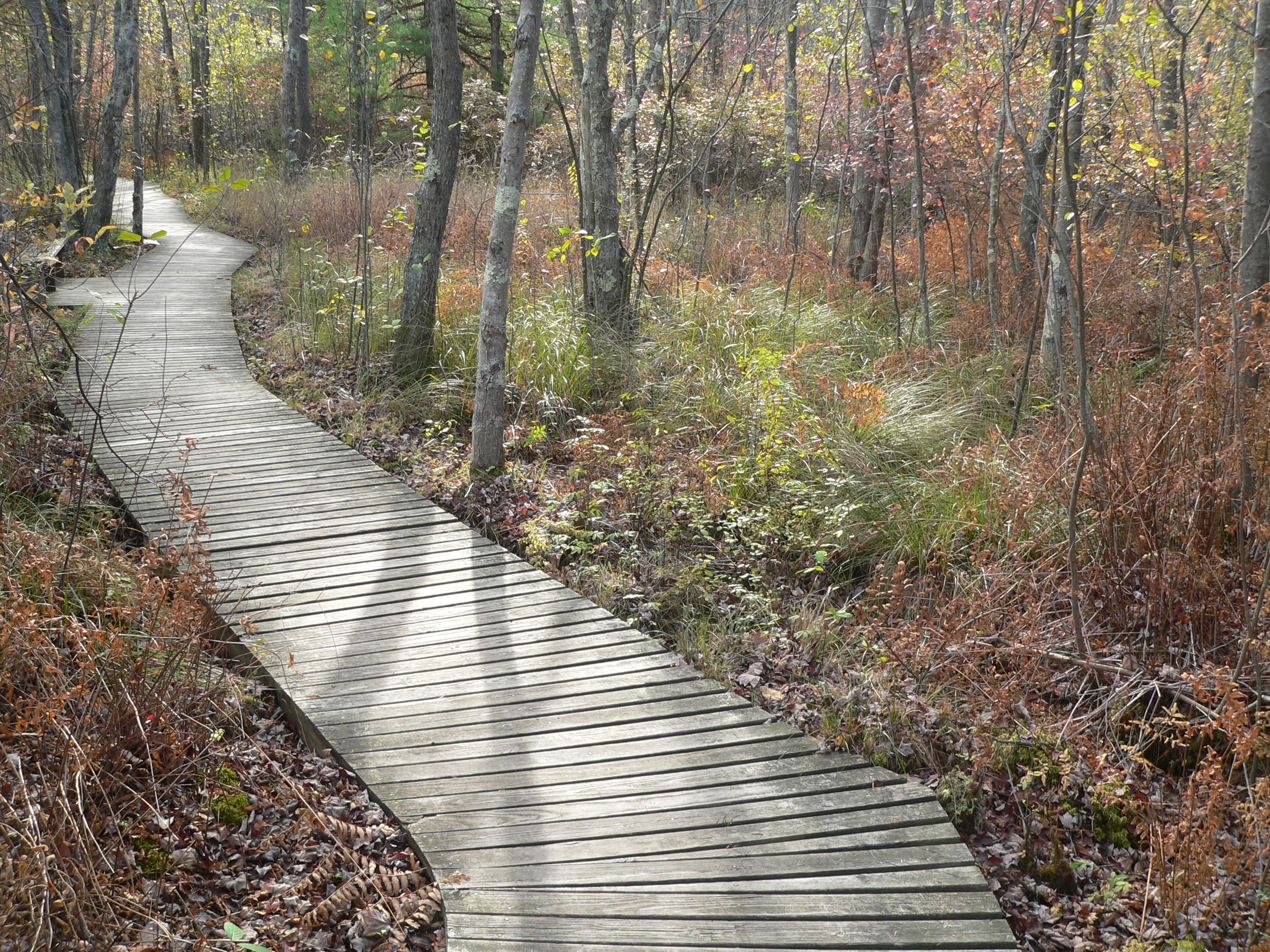
- Boardwalk
- Interactive map of Moose Hill Wildlife Sanctuary
- Type: Wildlife sanctuary, nature center
- Location: 293 Moose Hill Parkway; Sharon, Massachusetts, USA
- Coordinates: 42°07′20″N 71°12′31″W
- Area: 1,971 acres (798 ha)
- Created: 1916
- Operator: Massachusetts Audubon Society
- Hiking trails: 25 miles
- Website: Moose Hill Wildlife Sanctuary

Moose Hill Wildlife Sanctuary is a 1,971 acres (798 ha) wildlife sanctuary located in Sharon, Massachusetts. The property is the oldest property of the Massachusetts Audubon Society, established in 1916. It is adjacent to Moose Hill Farm, which is owned by the Trustees of Reservations.

The nature center on Moose Hill Parkway was acquired in 1990. The center displays rotating exhibits throughout the year. The sanctuary consists of habitats including forest, freshwater marsh, meadow, eskers and kettle holes. Over 160 species of birds have been observed on the property.

== Programs ==
Moose Hill has many public programs. There is an outdoor summer day camp for children 3 - 14. Additionally, for adults, there are various clubs and programs. For example, instructors are available to demonstrate how to make maple syrup during maple sugaring season.

== Trails ==
The 25 miles (40 km) of trails in Moose Hill include the Summit Trail, the Vernal Pool Loop, the Billings Loop, the Turkey Trail, the Old Pasture Trail, the Field Loop, and the Bluff Trail. The Bluff Trail is considered the most popular trail in Moose Hill.

The Bay Circuit Trail and the Warner Trail cross the property.

== Gallery ==
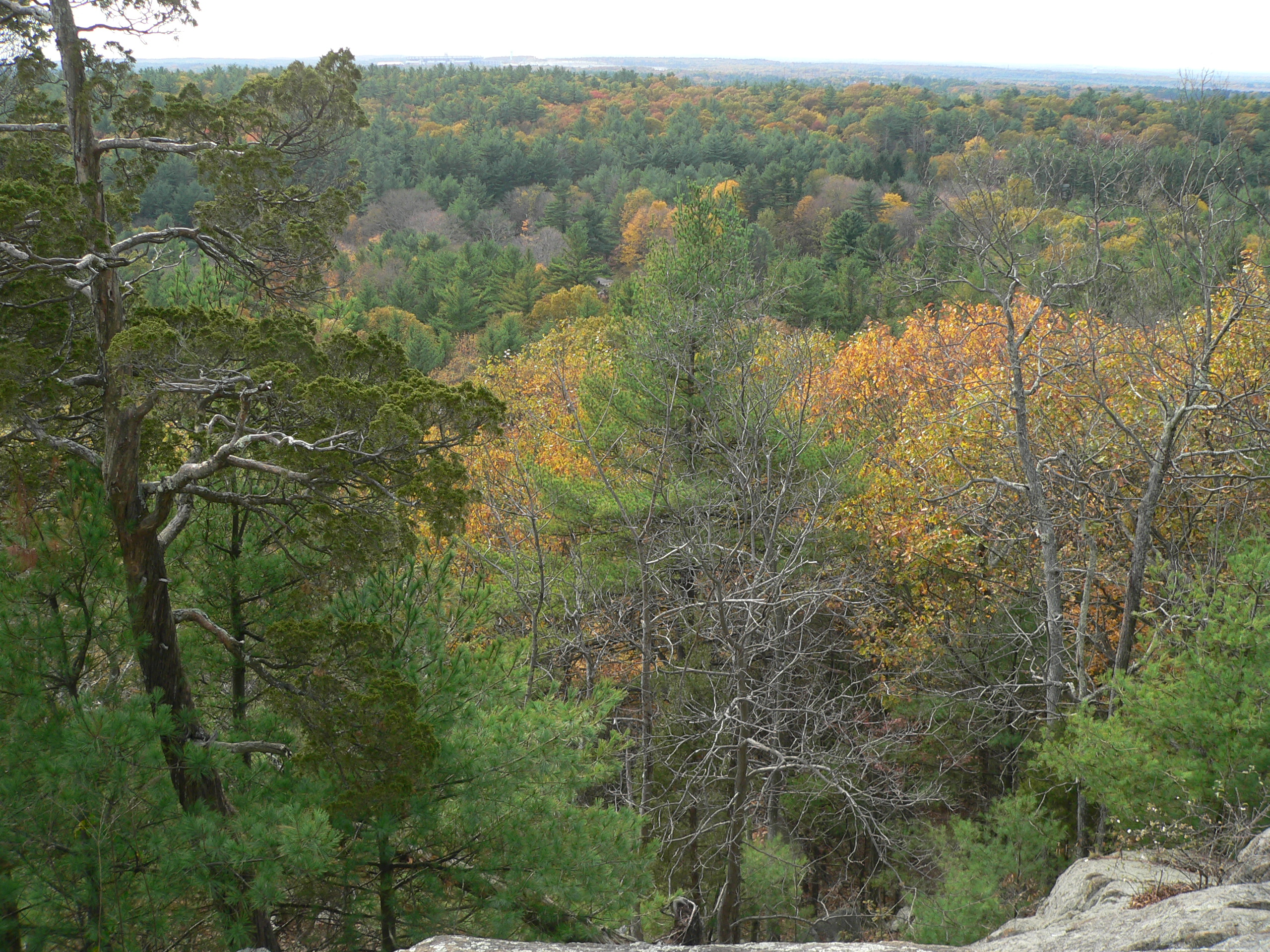
View from Bluff Overlook

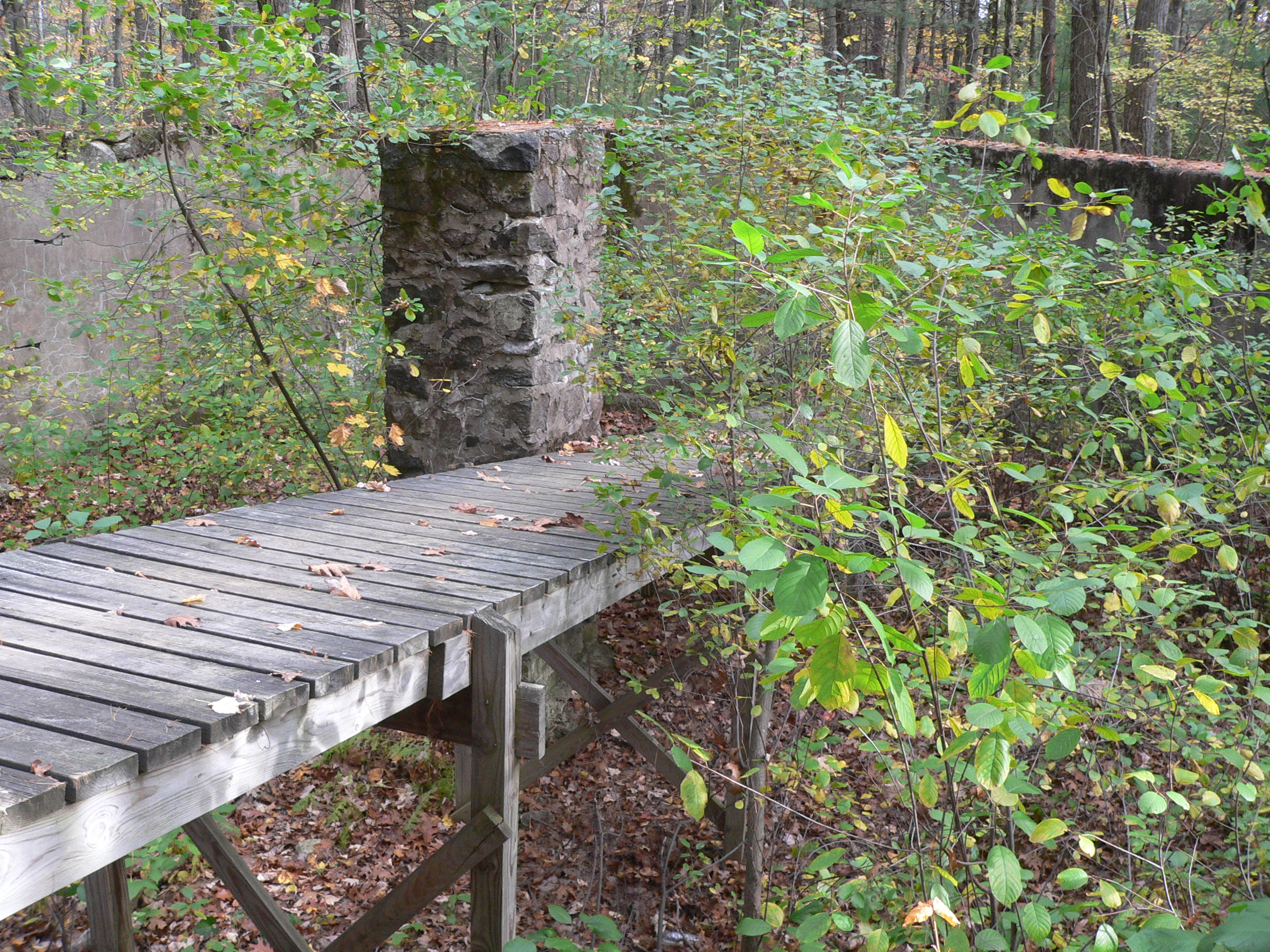
Remains of a cistern

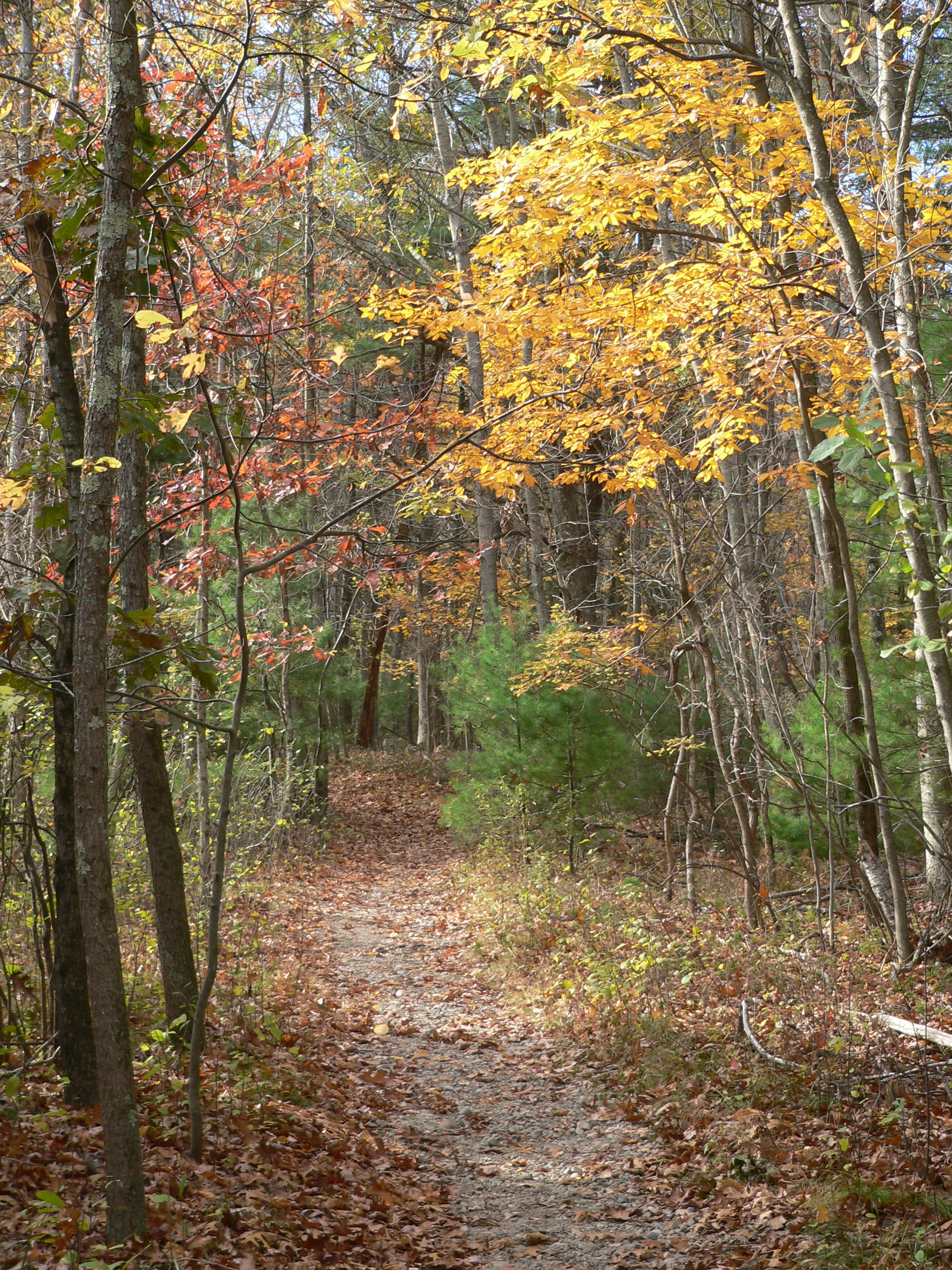
Trail

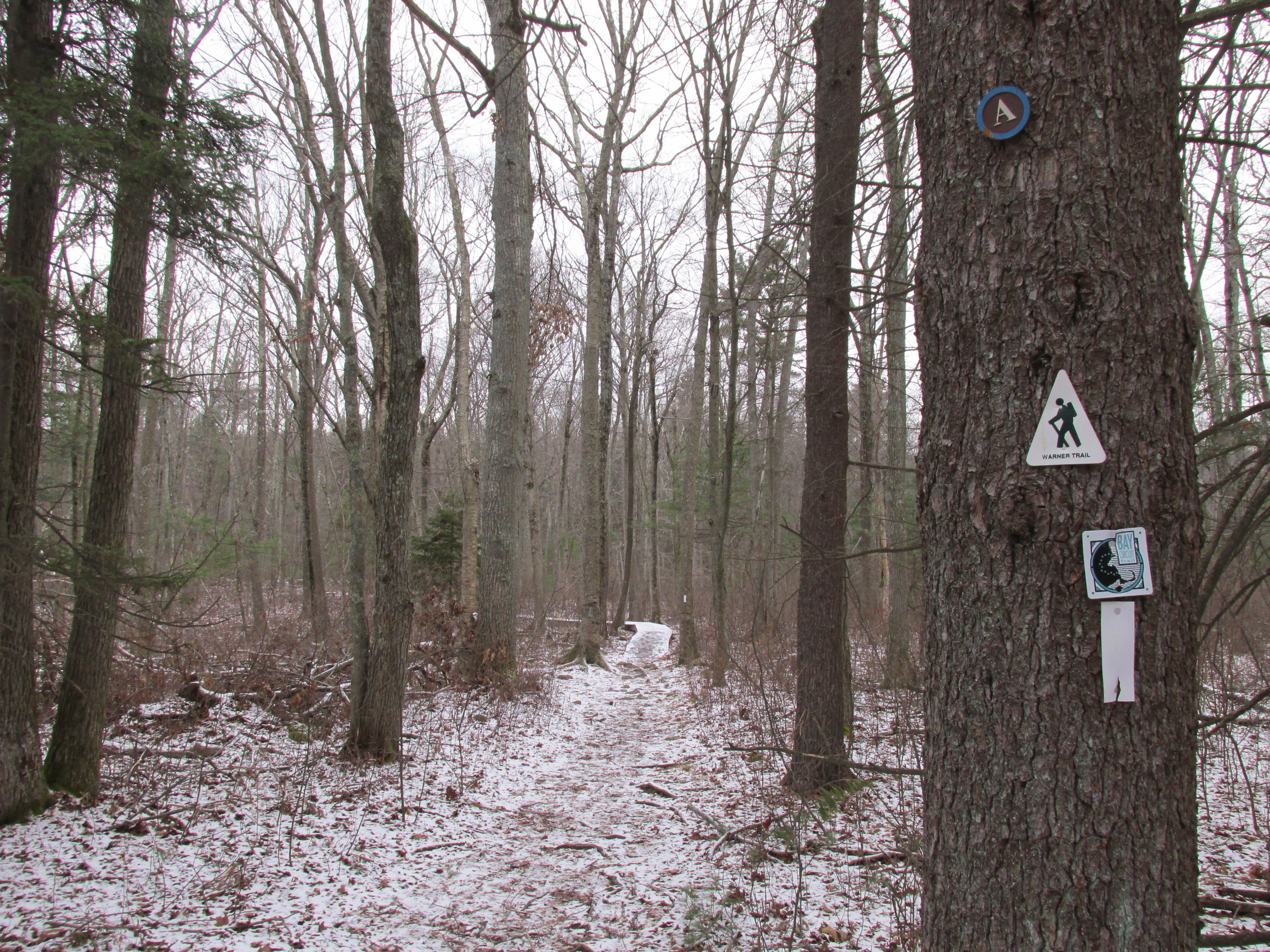
Warner Trail and Bay Circuit Trail through the sanctuary

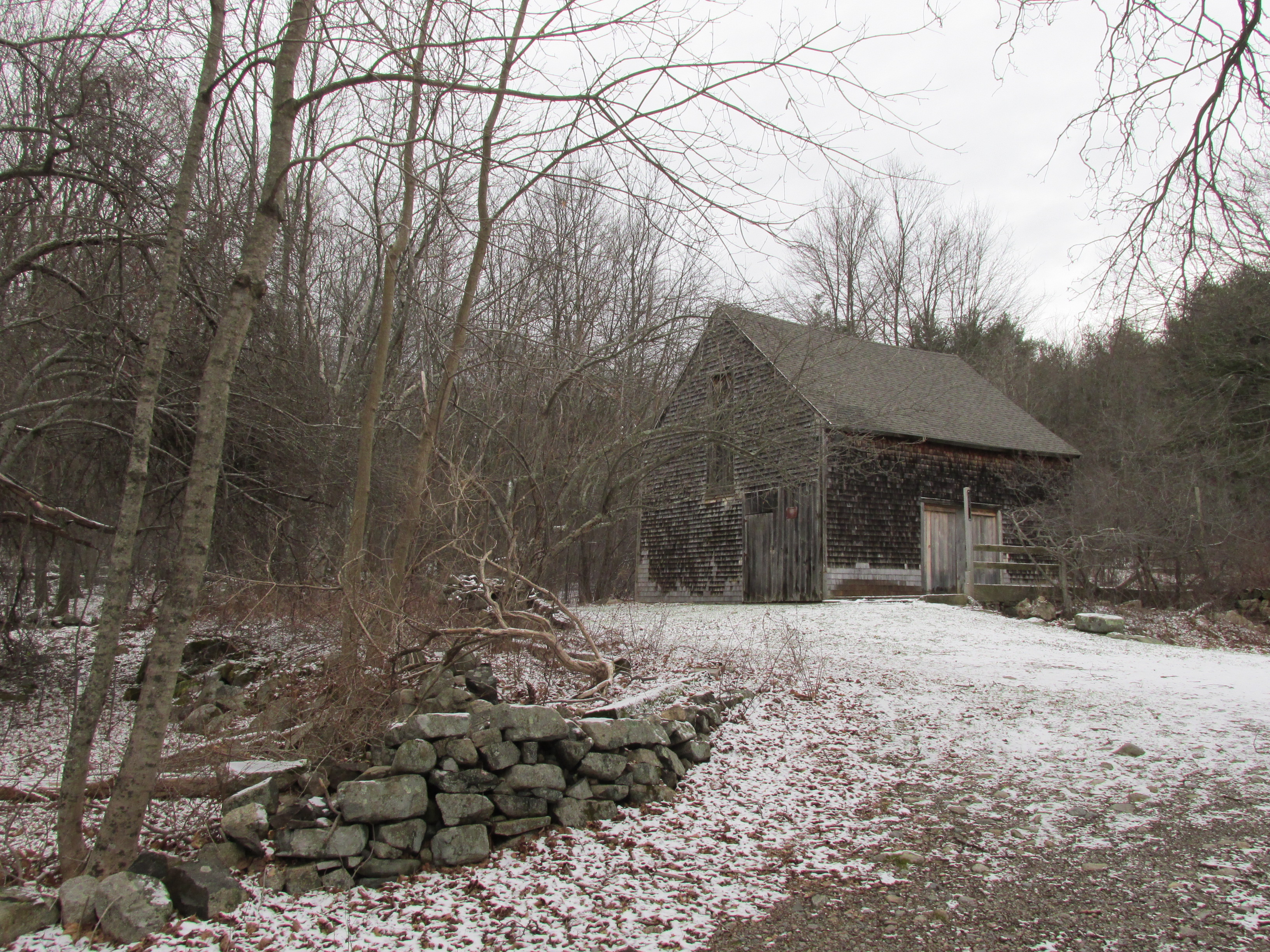
Billings Barn
