= Diamond Hill (Cumberland, Rhode Island) =

Hill in Cumberland, Rhode Island, US

Coordinates: 41°59′59.2″N 71°24′49.2″W

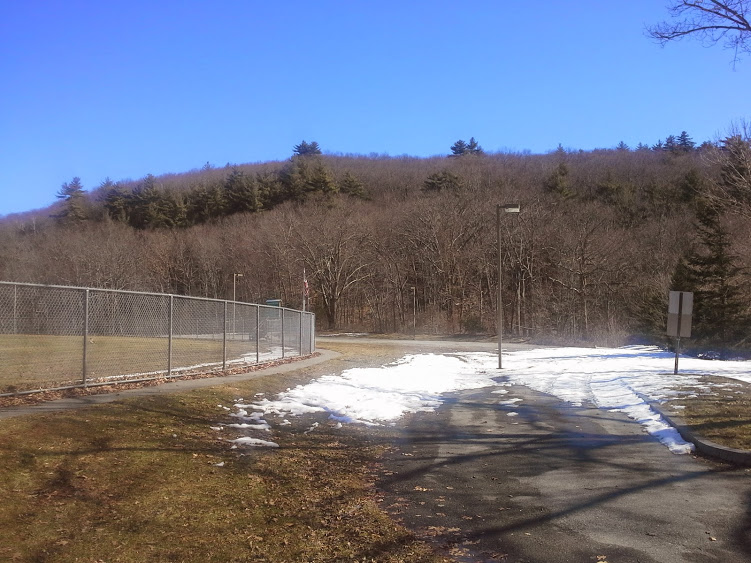
Diamond Hill in Cumberland Rhode Island in 2014

Diamond Hill is a large hill on Diamond Hill Road in Cumberland, Rhode Island, which contains a town park and former ski area. The summit is 481 feet above sea level. On a clear day, the Boston skyline and Mount Wachusett are visible.

Diamond Hill is a massive outcropping of white quartz with a vertical drop of 350 feet. The hill was named in colonial times and takes its name "from its sparkling and shining appearance." In the colonial era, the Whipple family (the children of John Whipple, Sr.) first settled near Diamond Hill, and during King Philip's War in the 1670s, several skirmishes occurred nearby, including Nine Men's Misery, the memorial of which is now on the grounds of the nearby Cumberland Monastery. In 1877 the Diamond Hill Granite Company founded a granite quarry northwest of Diamond Hill and copper was also mined near the hill. In 1935 "Philip Allen, C. Faulkner Kendall, and Henry Munroe Rogers offered 235 acres of land on the hill to the State of Rhode Island" and ski trails were cut shortly thereafter.

In the twentieth century, the hill contained two small ski areas, Ski Valley (operating from 1939 to 1981) and Diamond Hill Reservation (operating from the mid-1960s to mid-1980s). In 1939 when the first ski area opened, it was a hike-up and ski-down facility, but operators of the ski areas eventually constructed rope tows, a T-bar, and multiple two person chair lifts. In the 1980s, some of the lifts and equipment were gradually sold, and the ski areas were closed. In 1997 the town of Cumberland acquired Diamond Hill from the State. The hill is now a 373-acre town park and is the starting point of the thirty-three mile Warner Trail. The park features athletic fields, picnic areas, 3.8 miles of hiking trails and a band stand near the pond.

A popular event, Cumberlandfest, is held each year on the second weekend of August at Diamond Hill Park. This event features a carnival, with rides and various venues, as well as live entertainment by Matty KayKay and a small fireworks show. Proceeds go to the town's athletic programs. This event attracts thousands of people every year.

Late in the year since 2002, the Cumberland Town and Recreational Department has organized a "Spook Trail" in the woods of Diamond Hill Park on Diamond Hill Road once called "Haunted Hill” now referred to as “13th World.” No longer run by the town.
