= Georgetown-Rowley State Forest =

Public forest in Massachusetts, United States

- Location within Massachusetts Location within the United States
- Location: Georgetown, Rowley and Boxford, Massachusetts, United States
- Coordinates: 42°42′32″N 70°59′07″W
- Area: 1,122 acres (454 ha)
- Elevation: 190 ft (58 m)
- Administrator: Massachusetts Department of Conservation and Recreation
- Website: Official website

Georgetown-Rowley State Forest is a 1,112-acre (450 ha) Massachusetts state forest located primarily in the towns of Georgetown and Rowley with a small spillage into the town of Boxford. The forest straddles Interstate 95 and abuts Willowdale State Forest at its southeastern edge. The forest is managed by the Massachusetts Department of Conservation and Recreation.

== Activities and amenities ==
Trails include a section of the Bay Circuit Trail and are used for hiking, walking, mountain biking, horseback riding, cross-country skiing and snowmobiling. The forest offers hunting with some restrictions.
