= Warner Trail =

New England hiking trail

Coordinates: 42.124°N 71.203°W

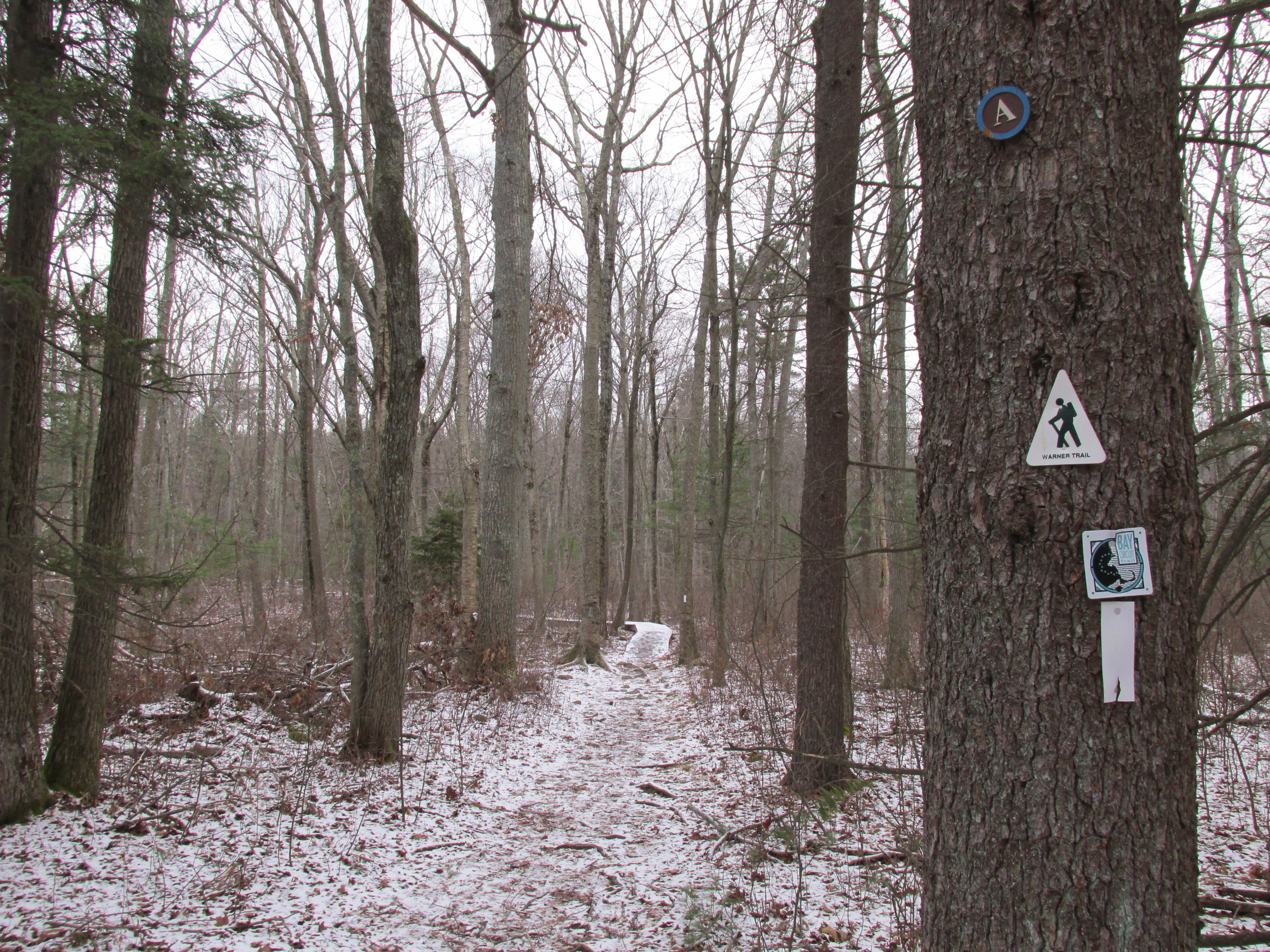
- Through the Moose Hill Wildlife Sanctuary
- Length: 30 mi (48 km)
- Location: Norfolk County, Massachusetts and Cumberland, Rhode Island
- Use: hiking, snowshoeing
- Highest point: Moose Hill, 534 ft (163 m)
- Lowest point: Canton Junction, 70 ft (21 m)
- Difficulty: easy, with rugged sections
- Season: easiest April through mid-November
- Hazards: deer ticks, poison ivy

The Warner Trail is a 30 mi (48 km) New England hiking trail which extends from Diamond Hill in the northeast corner of Rhode Island northeast through Norfolk County, Massachusetts to Canton, 13 miles (21 km) south of Boston.

== Description ==
Its route winds through what has become a primarily suburban landscape punctuated by significant pockets of rural conservation land and state forest. The terrain is hilly and occasionally rugged with ledges of metamorphic rock and granite; forest cover is of the oak-hickory type. Completed in 1947, the trail originally stretched from Diamond Hill to the Blue Hills Reservation in Randolph, Massachusetts, but encroaching development had truncated the route by the 1970s. Plans to rebuild that lost connection were put forward in 2003 as part of Massachusetts' Commonwealth Connections statewide greenway initiative. The Appalachian Mountain Club and the Friends of the Warner Trail maintain the Warner Trail.

The trail passes through Cumberland, Rhode Island and the Massachusetts towns of Canton, Sharon, Foxboro, Wrentham, and Plainville. There are no overnight facilities on the Warner Trail. The Warner Trail connects to the 200 mi (320 km) Bay Circuit Trail.

== Route features ==
White rectangles and metal disks mark the trail. From south to north, the trail visits a number of high points with ledge-top views including Diamond Hill 481 feet (147 m), also known for its defunct ski area; Sunset Rock, Wampum Rock, Knuckup Hill, Outlook Rock, Pinnacle Hill, Goat Rock, High Rock, Pierce Hill, Allen Ledge, Bluff Head, and Moose Hill, the trail's high point. The Warner Trail also visits a number of bodies of water and passes through three state forests (Wrentham State Forest, F. Gilbert Hills State Forest, and Foxboro State Forest), the new Diamond Hill State Park in Rhode Island, and the Massachusetts Audubon Society's Moose Hill Sanctuary.
