= Fork Factory Brook =

Nature preserve in Medfield, Massachusetts

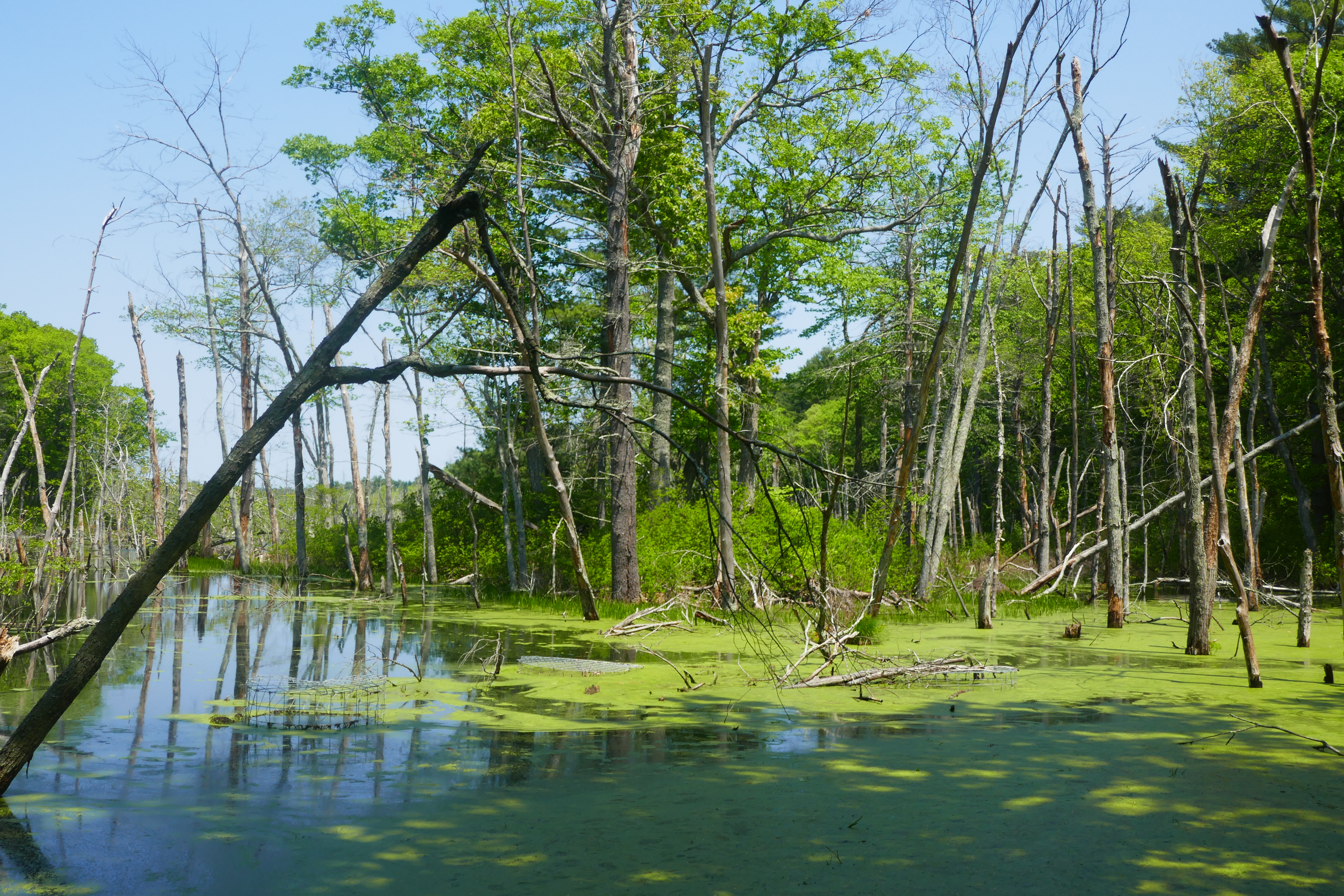
- Wetlands near the former factory site
- Interactive map of Fork Factory Brook
- Coordinates: 42.2097°N 71.2745°W
- Established: 1966; 60 years ago
- Operator: The Trustees of Reservations
- Website: Fork Factory Brook

Fork Factory Brook is a 135-acre (55 ha) historic site, open space reserve, and agricultural reserve located in Medfield, Massachusetts. The reserve, managed by the land conservation non-profit organization The Trustees of Reservations, is notable for its wetlands, ledges, 300-year-old hayfields, and the ruins of a 19th-century pitchfork mill for which the property is named. Fork Factory Brook offers 1.5 miles (2.4 km) of trails and former woods roads available for hiking, horseback riding, mountain biking, and cross country skiing. The property is part of a larger area of protected open space including the abutting Rocky Woods preserve, also managed by The Trustees of Reservations.

== Terrain and History ==
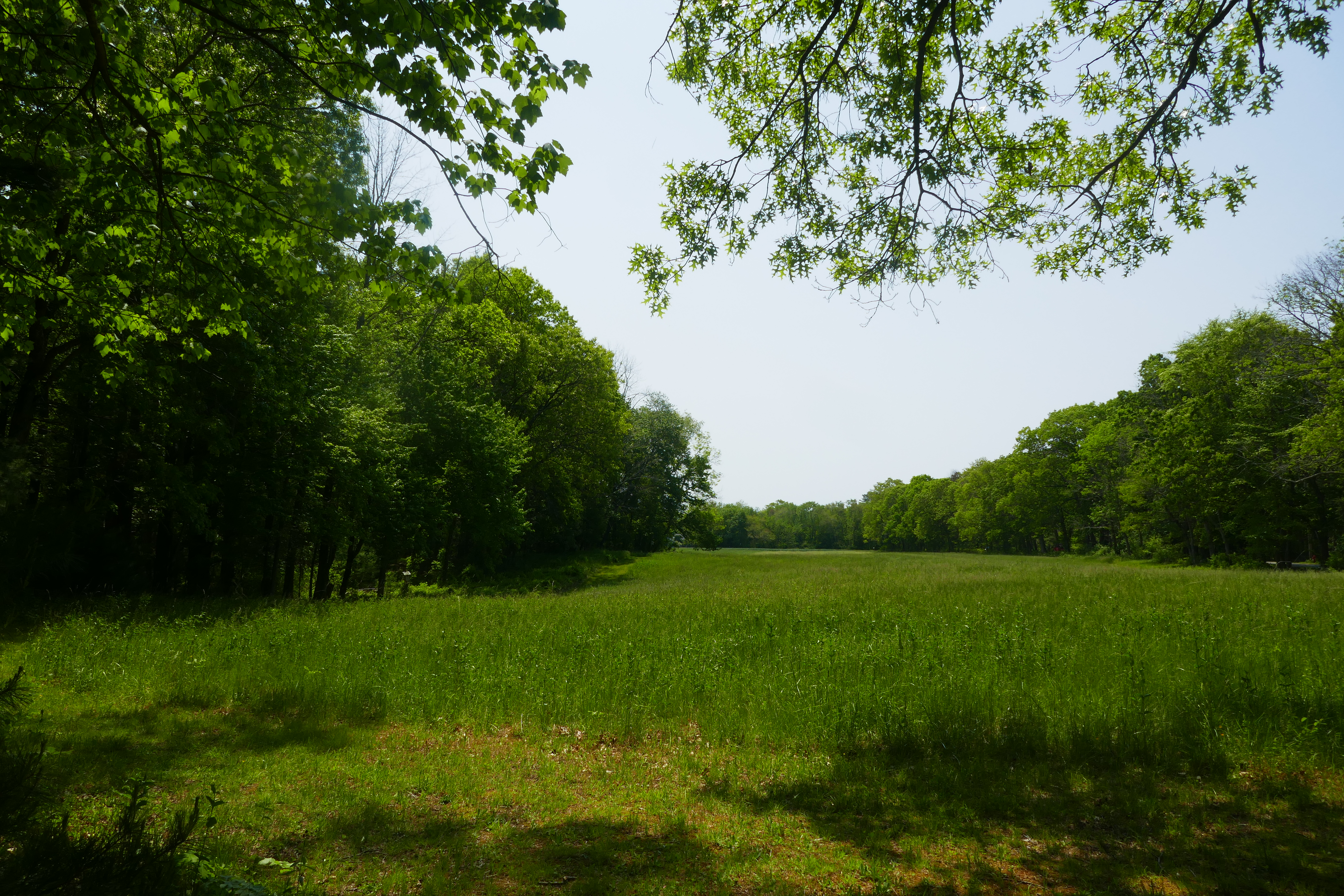
Long Acre Farm

Hayfields on the property formerly belonged to Long Acre Farm, whose agricultural history spanned 300 years. The farm grew crops and maintained livestock;produced rope from hemp, flax, and wool; made butter and cheese; and produced candles and boots with animal byproducts. Fields on the property are currently maintained to produce hay.

A succession of mills were operated on the property, beginning in 1771 when Joshua Morse built a grist mill along Mill Brook. Henry Partridge bought two mills on Mill Brook in the early 19th century and modified them to produce high quality iron products. Partridge capitalized on local farming interests by producing metal farm implements, most notably the pitchfork for which the property is named. The mills ran for twenty years after which they saw a brief revival as a paper cutting enterprise near the end of the American Civil War. In 1927 the mills, defunct at the time, were torn down when the town widened its main street; only the stone raceway and earthen dam remain; they are located at the south end of the Fork Factory Brook reservation.

The original acreage was a gift of Pliny Jewell, Jr. and Mrs. Barrett Williams in 1966 in memory of their parents. Additional lands were purchased and donated in 1978 and 1985.

== Recreation ==
A network of trails span the property and connect with the abutting Rocky Woods reservation. Trails pass along the borders of hayfields and the wetlands of Mill Brook, over rocky knolls, and to the pitchfork mill ruins. Fork Factory Brook shares a trailhead parking lot with Rocky Woods, located on Hartford Street in Medfield.

Fork Factory Book is within two miles of both the 200-mile (320 km) Bay Circuit Trail system and the Charles River Link Trail.
