= Moose Hill Farm =

Open space preserve and historic farm complex in Sharon, Massachusetts

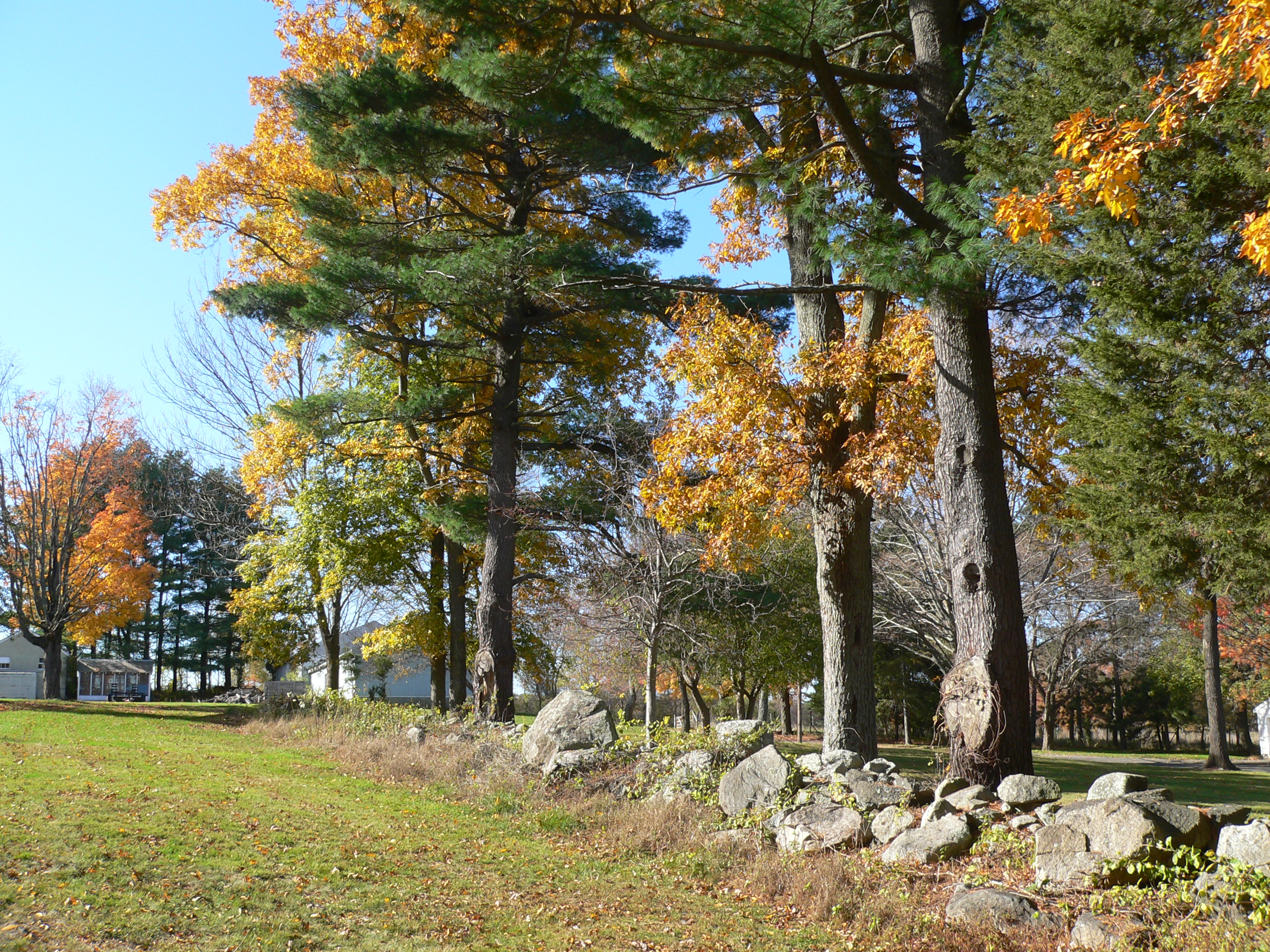
- stone fence
- Interactive map of Moose Hill Farm
- Location: 396 Moose Hill Street; Sharon, Massachusetts, United States
- Coordinates: 42.1275°N 71.2104°W
- Area: 347 acres (140 ha)
- Established: 2005
- Operator: The Trustees of Reservations
- Website: Moose Hill Farm

Moose Hill Farm is a 347-acre (140 ha) open space preserve and historic farm complex located in Sharon, Massachusetts near the 450 feet (140 m) summit of Moose Hill. The property, acquired in 2005 by the land conservation non-profit organization The Trustees of Reservations, includes farmland, woodlots, 21 farm buildings, hiking trails, stands of mature American Chestnuts, and scenic vistas of the Boston skyline. Moose Hill Farm is part of a larger area of protected open space including state land and the Massachusetts Audubon Society's Moose Hill Wildlife Sanctuary.

== Description ==
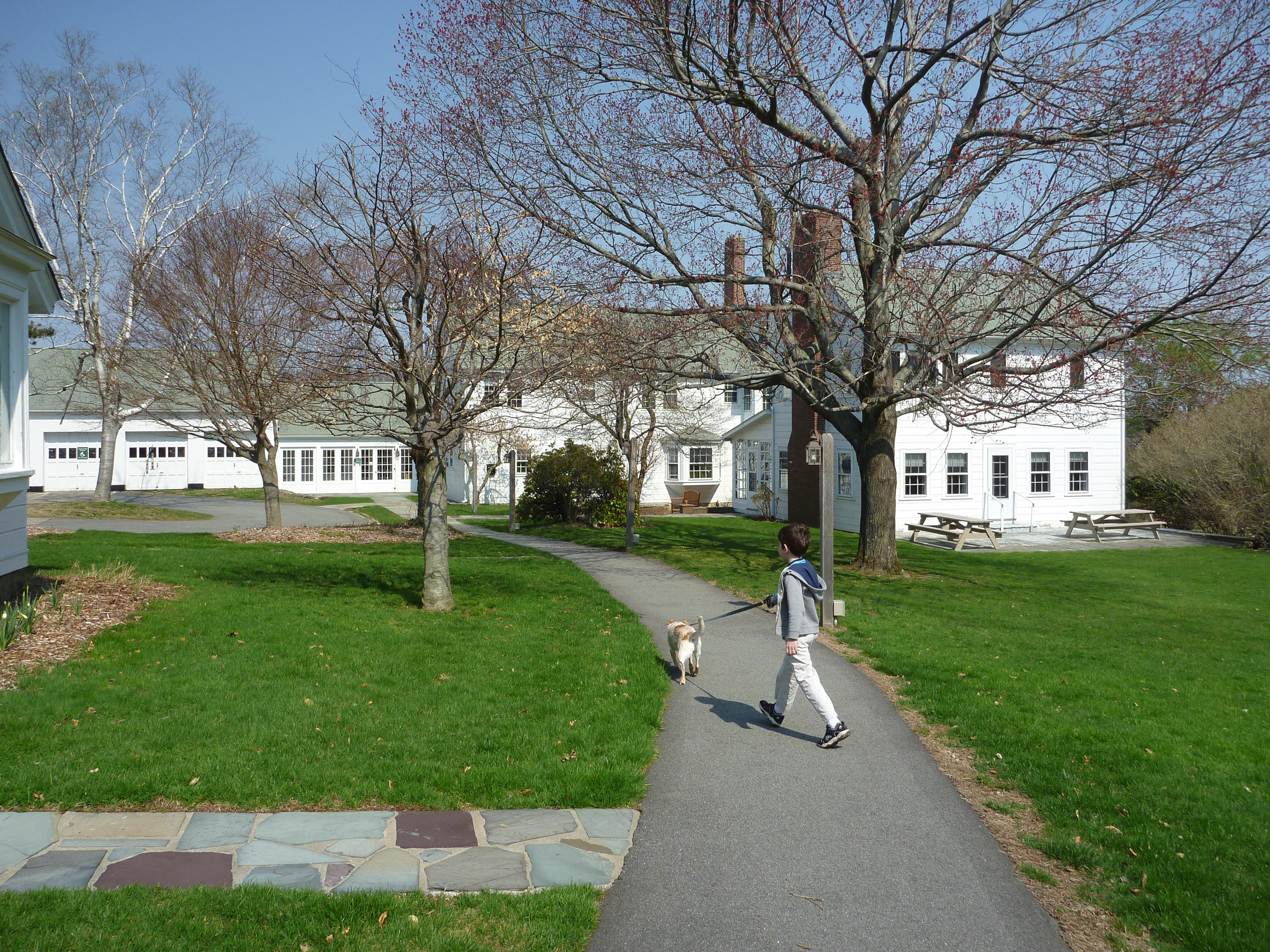
Dogs are allowed at Moose Hill Farm subject to guidelines.

The reservation is open to hiking, picnicking, and cross country skiing. Dogs are allowed at Moose Hill Farm subject to "Guidelines for Dog Walkers". The Trustees of Reservations staff offer guided interpretive programs in season.

== History ==
The property once belonged to industrialist Henry P. Kendall, owner of the multi-national Kendall Company. Kendall acquired Moose Hill Farm which housed a Guernsey dairy herd in the 1940s. Prior to that, the property had been used as a dairy and sheep farm since the 1800s.

== Gallery ==
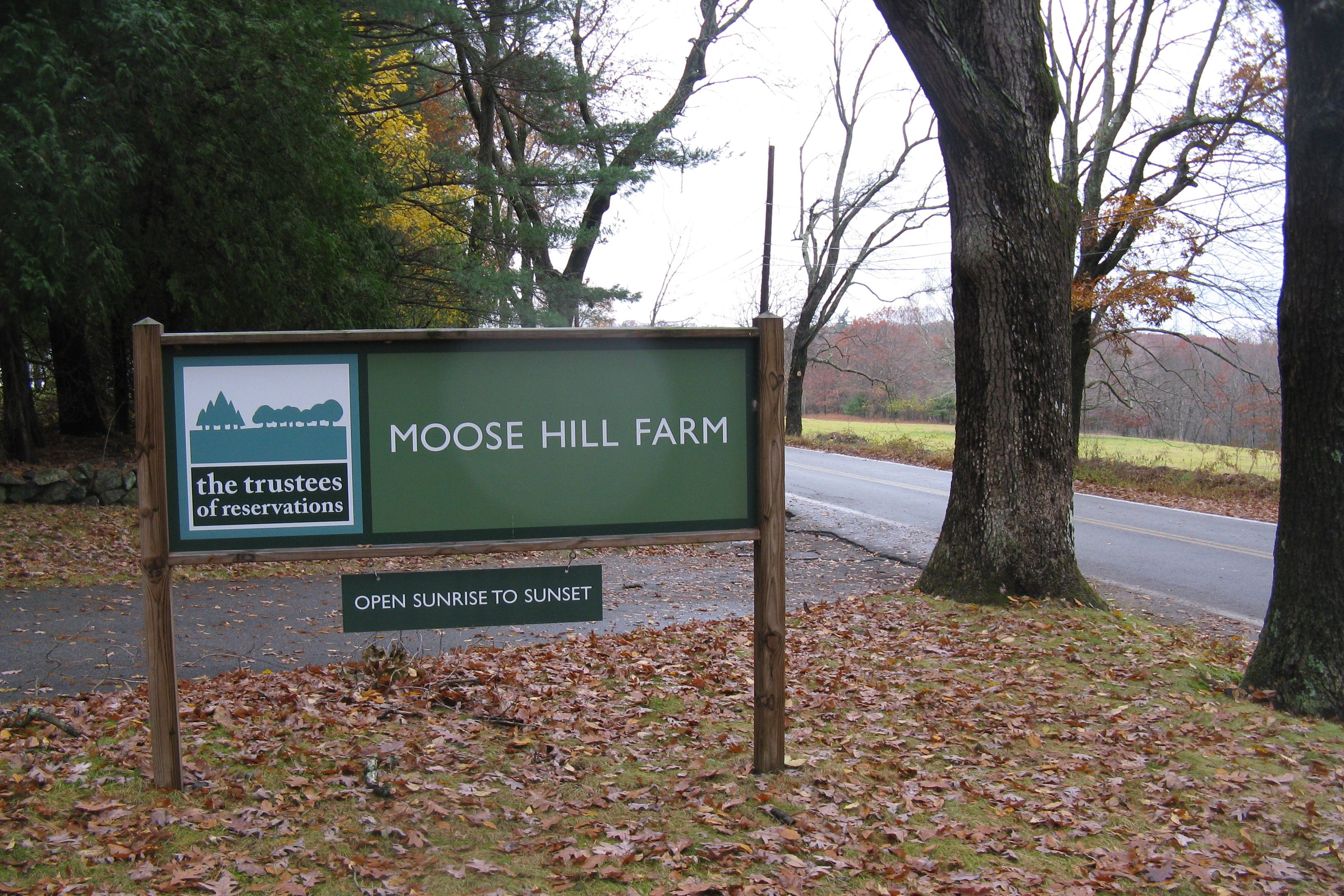

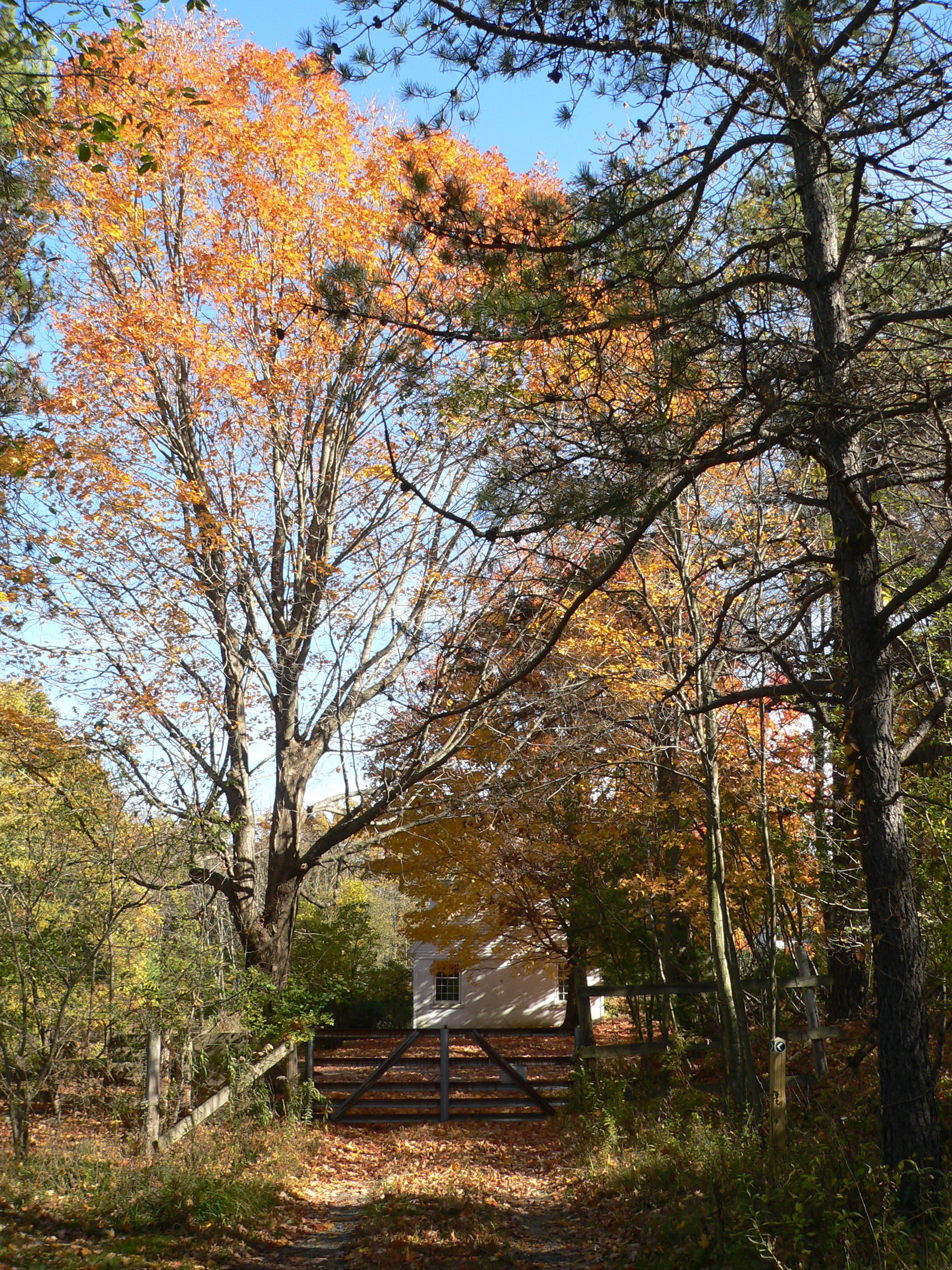

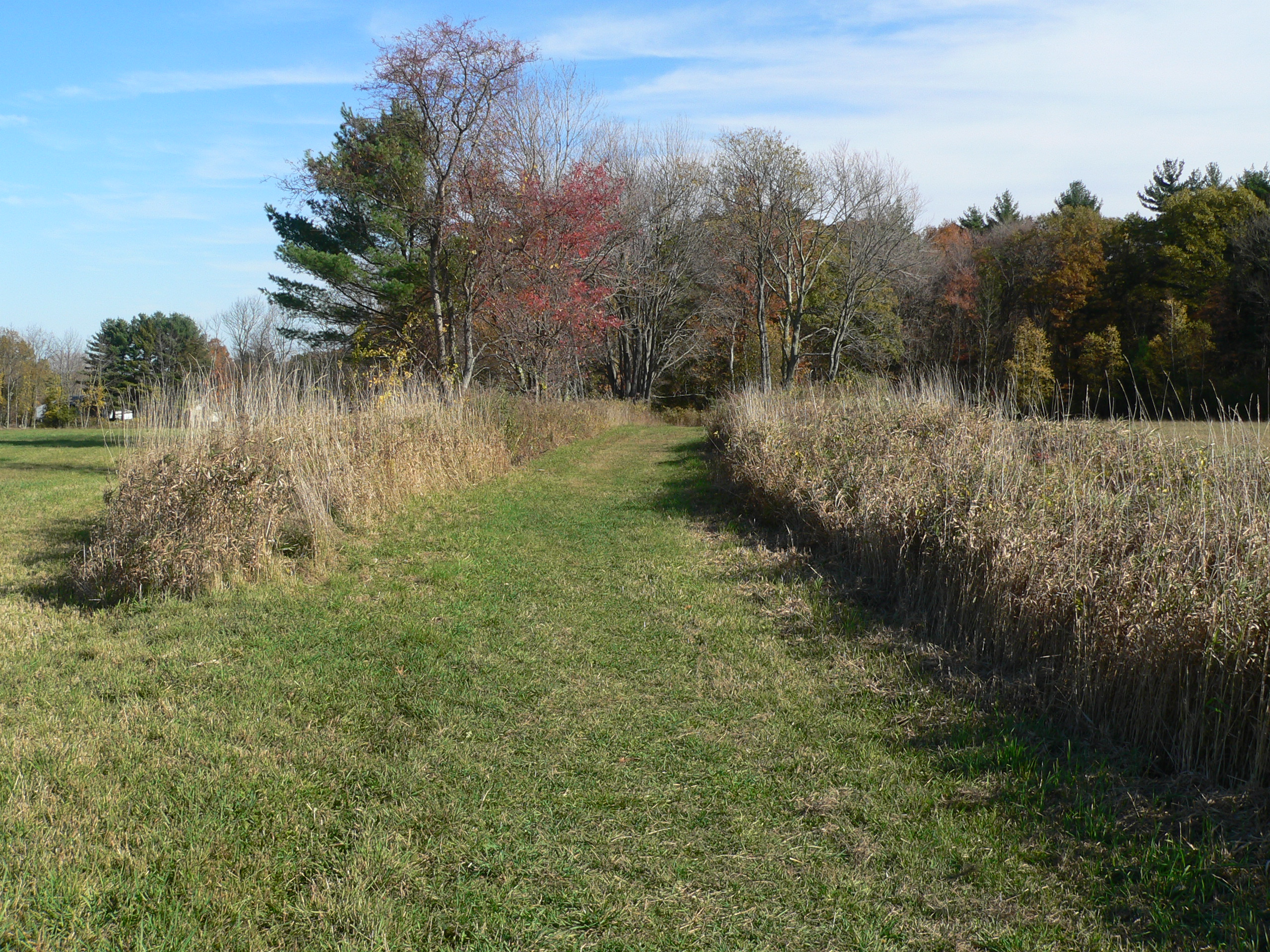

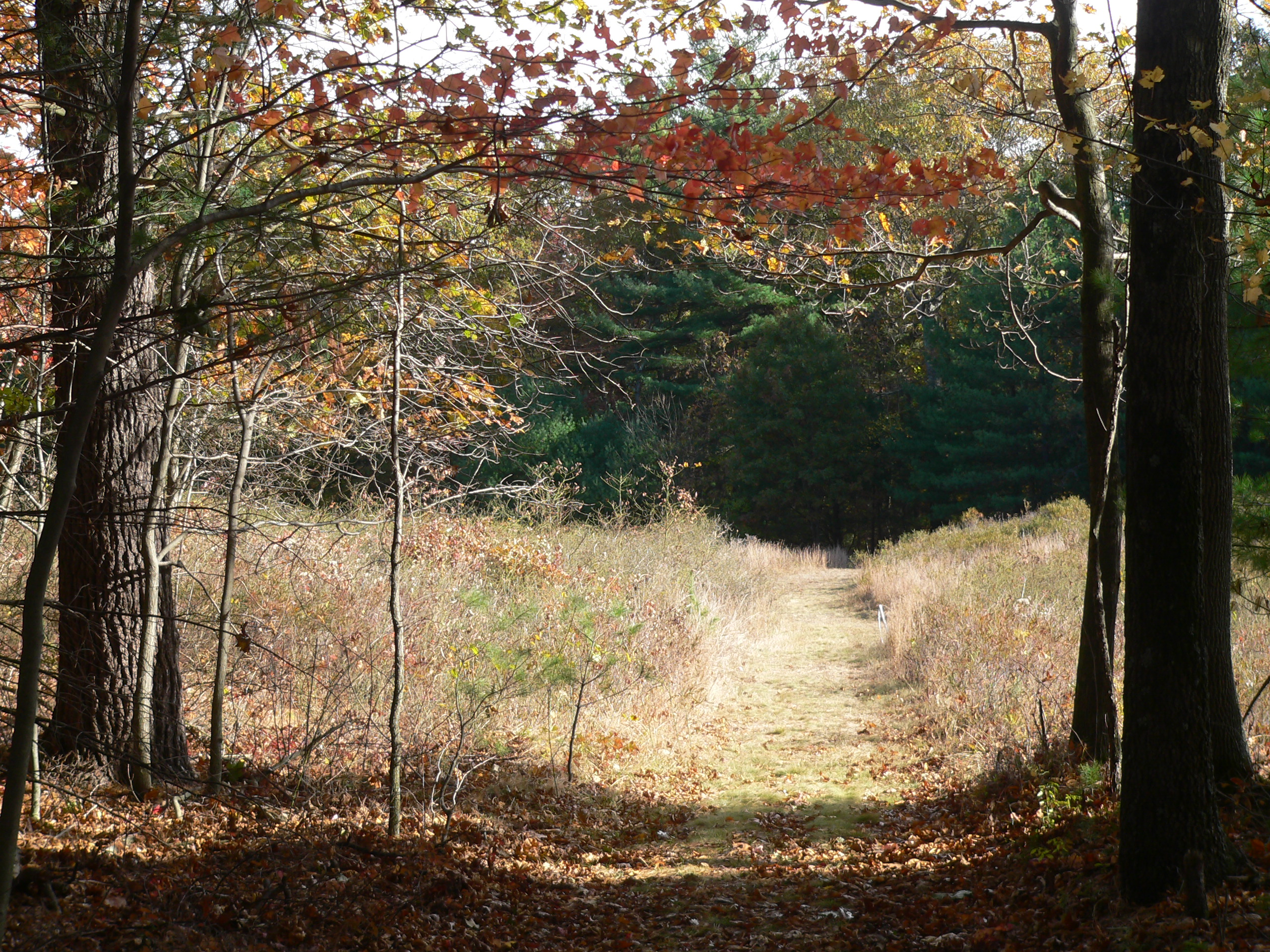

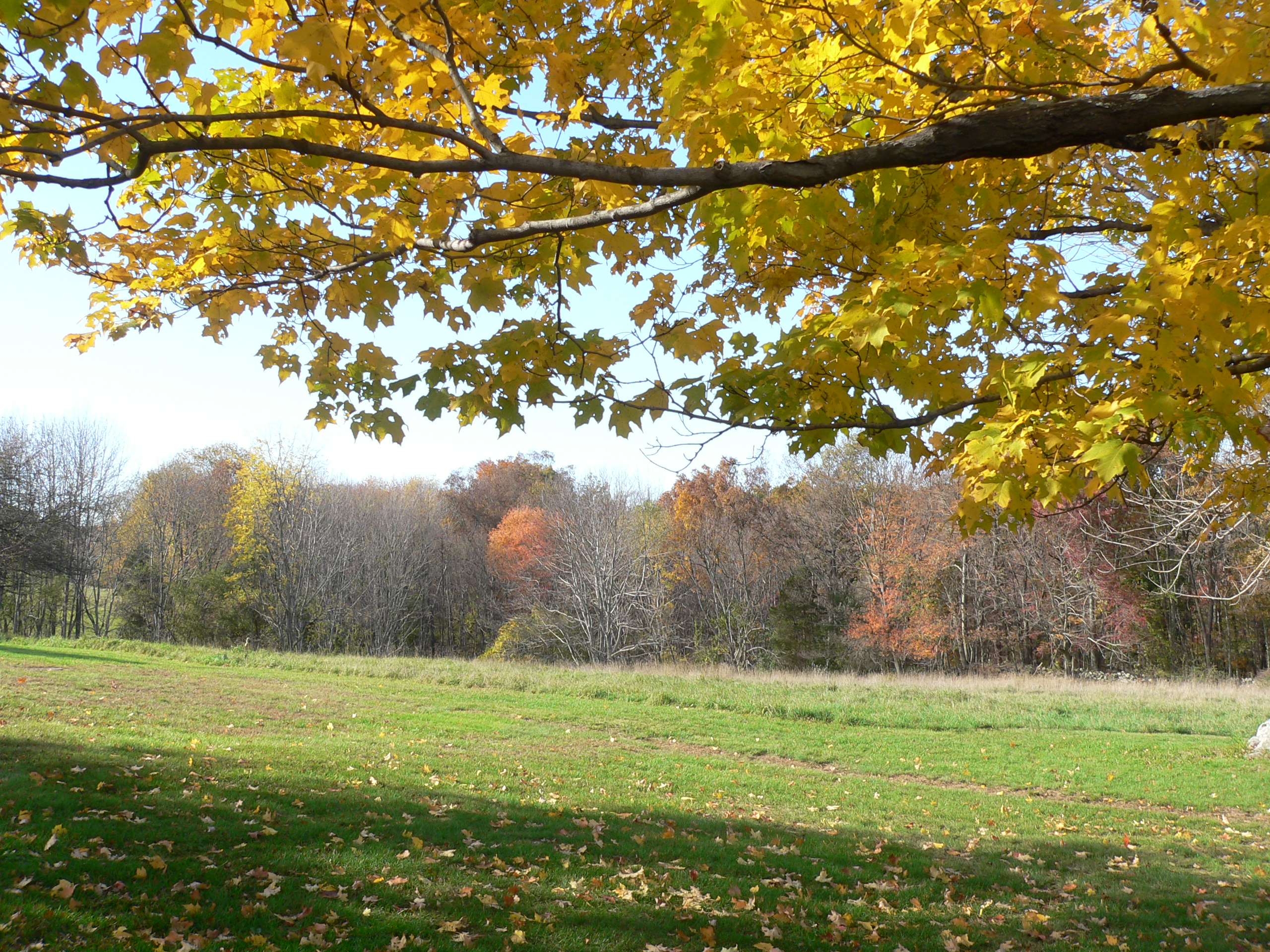
