= Car-top boating =

Recreational activity

Example of a symbol used in park information literature for car-top boating

Car-top boating is the recreational activity of boating via watercraft that can easily be transported on the roof of a passenger motor vehicle. Boats that fall into this category include most canoes and kayaks as well as small rowboats, bass boats, sailboats, and inflatable boats. The term has come into use by various state, federal, municipal, and non-profit agencies in the United States as a way to clearly discriminate in written policy between less intrusive hand-portable watercraft and large, more intrusive watercraft that require boat ramps to launch.
