= Medfield Rhododendrons =

Nature Reserve in Massachusetts

Coordinates: 42.1764°N 71.3055°W

The Medfield Rhododendrons is a 196-acre (0.79 km^{2}) nature reserve established in 1934 in Medfield, Massachusetts managed by the Trustees of Reservations. The site contains the largest area of Rhododendron maximum in the state, which are currently listed as threatened by the Massachusetts Natural Heritage and Endangered Species Program due to over-collecting.

== Gallery ==
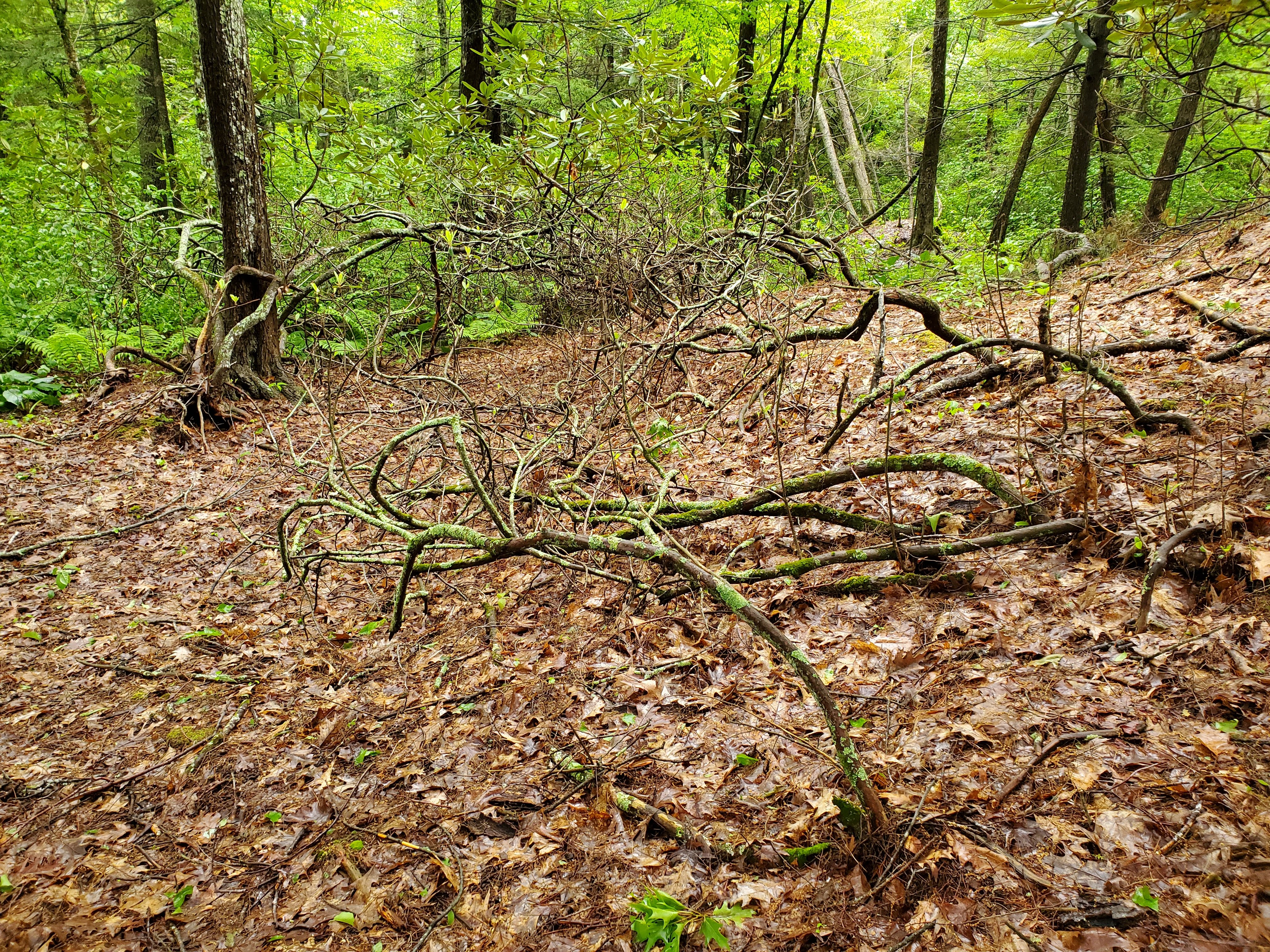
Rhododendron bush

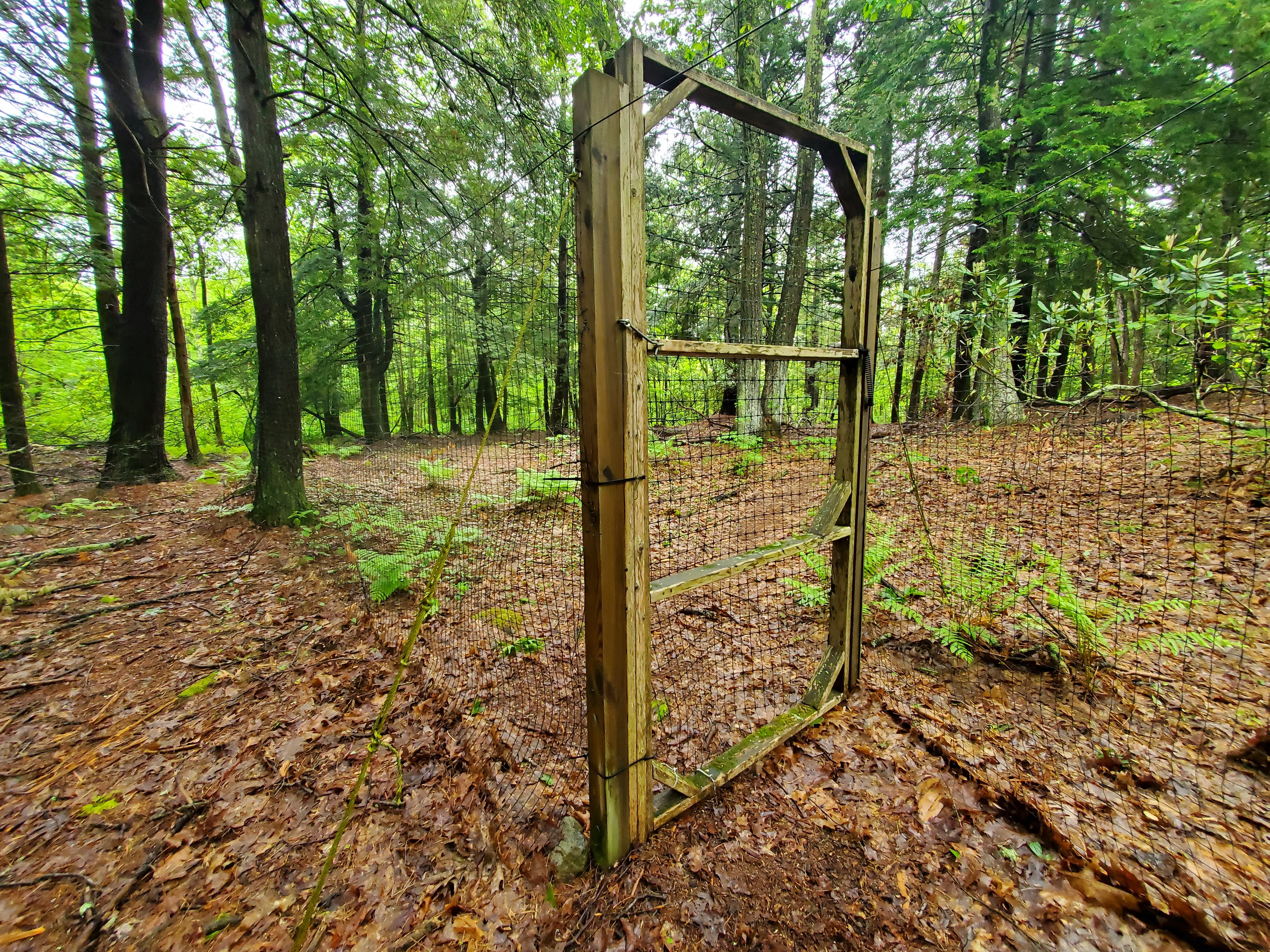
Fencing installed in an attempt to protect the rhododendrons from deer

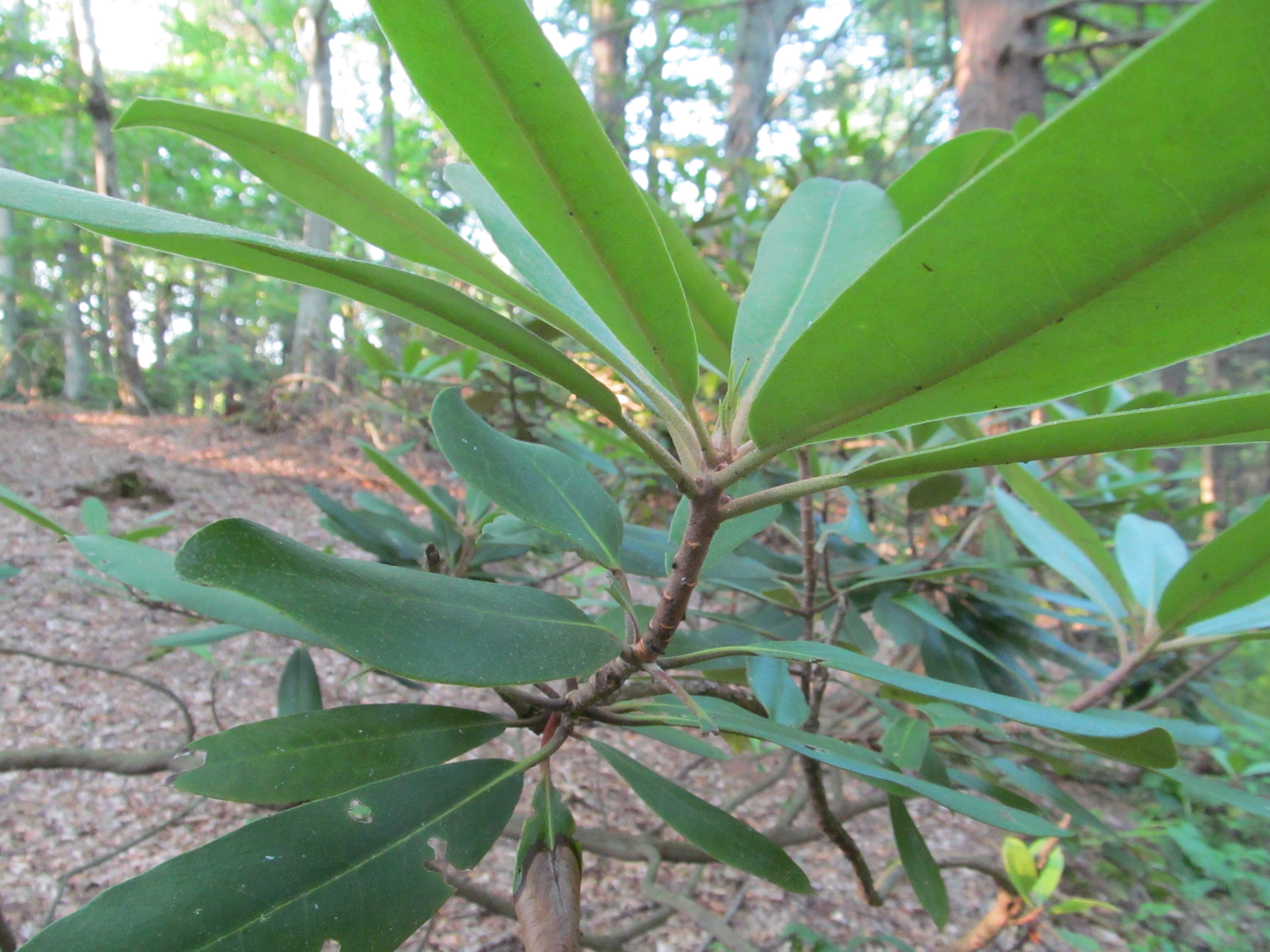
Detail
