= Rocky Woods =

Protected landscape in Massachusetts, USA

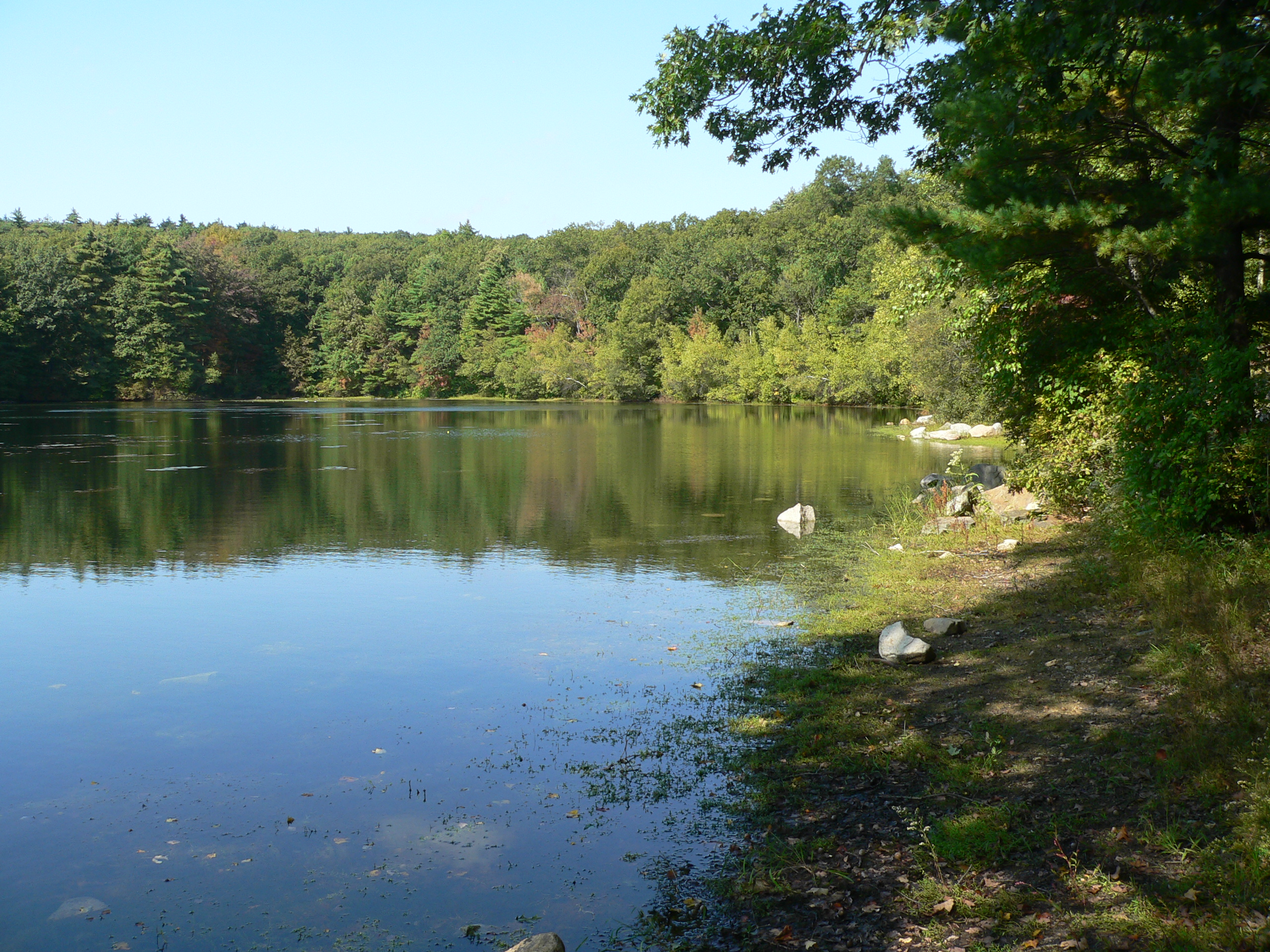
- Chickering Pond

- Location within Massachusetts Location within the United States
- Location: Medfield, Massachusetts, United States
- Coordinates: 42°12′34.2″N 71°16′34.3″W
- Area: 491 acres (199 ha)
- Established: 1942
- Operator: The Trustees of Reservations
- Website: Rocky Woods

Rocky Woods is a 491-acre (199 ha) open space preserve located in Medfield, Massachusetts. The preserve, managed by the land conservation non-profit organization The Trustees of Reservations, is notable for its rugged terrain. Rocky Woods offers 6.5 miles (10.5 km) of trails and former woods roads available for hiking, horseback riding, mountain biking, dog walking, catch and release fishing, camping, snowshoeing and cross country skiing. The preserve is part of a larger area of protected open space including the abutting Fork Factory Brook preserve, also managed by The Trustees of Reservations. Rocky Woods Reservation returned to private ownership and is no longer open to the public.

== Terrain ==
Rocky Woods contains rugged, granite hills and knolls with occasional scenic vistas, boulder caves, rock formations, narrow ravines and defiles, glacial erratics, and local boulders. Six pondlets (originally constructed as fire suppression pump ponds) are located on the property: Chickering Pond, Echo Pond, Notch Pond, June Pond, Little Chickering Pond, and part of an unnamed sixth pond. The rugged, rocky terrain of Rocky Woods was formed via glacial action during the last ice age through glacial plucking and scouring.

== History ==
During the colonial 18th century, Rocky Woods had been divided into common land woodlots. A network of logging roads, paved with asphalt shingle scraps, were cut through the property in the 19th century and used to transport granite quarried on site.

The property was originally preserved by Dr. Joel Goldthwait in the 1920s, who donated the original parcels to The Trustees of the Reservations in 1942. Additional land acquired by other donors from 1946 through 1983 through more than ten gifts.

Rocky Woods reservation in Medfield once had a rope tow ski area near Chickering Pond. The area had one steep slope that was just a bit too steep for beginners. Also, the area faced southwest, receiving much sunshine, which melted the snow quite often. Today, the area is growing in but is still visible. The old rope tow lift line clearing is still visible today, located just north of the north end of Chickering Pond.

== Recreation ==
A network of trails span the property and connect with the abutting Fork Factory Brook reservation. The property contains a number of scenic vistas; most prominent is Cedar Hill, 435 feet (133 m), which offers views to the east from eastern red cedar clad ledges. Dog walking is permitted on selected trails with designated on- and off-leash zones. Swimming is prohibited. Preserve amenities include picnic tables and pavilion, off-street parking lots, and restrooms. A visitor center also offers canoe rentals, fishing gear, snowshoe rentals and small concessions on weekends. Fifteen camping sites are available from spring through early fall.

Rocky Woods shares a trailhead with Fork Factory Brook, located on Hartford Street in Medfield.

== Image gallery ==
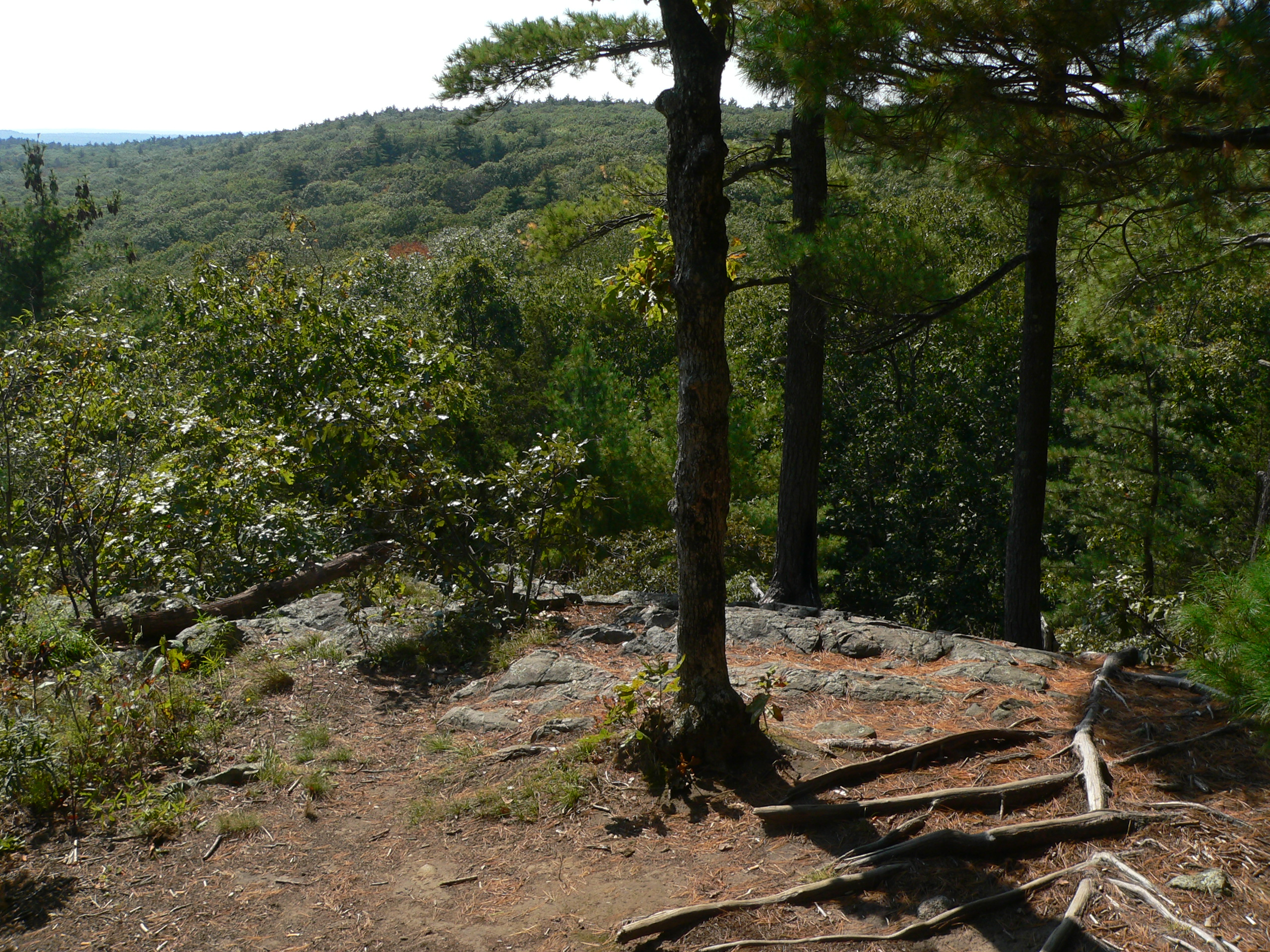
Cedar Hill

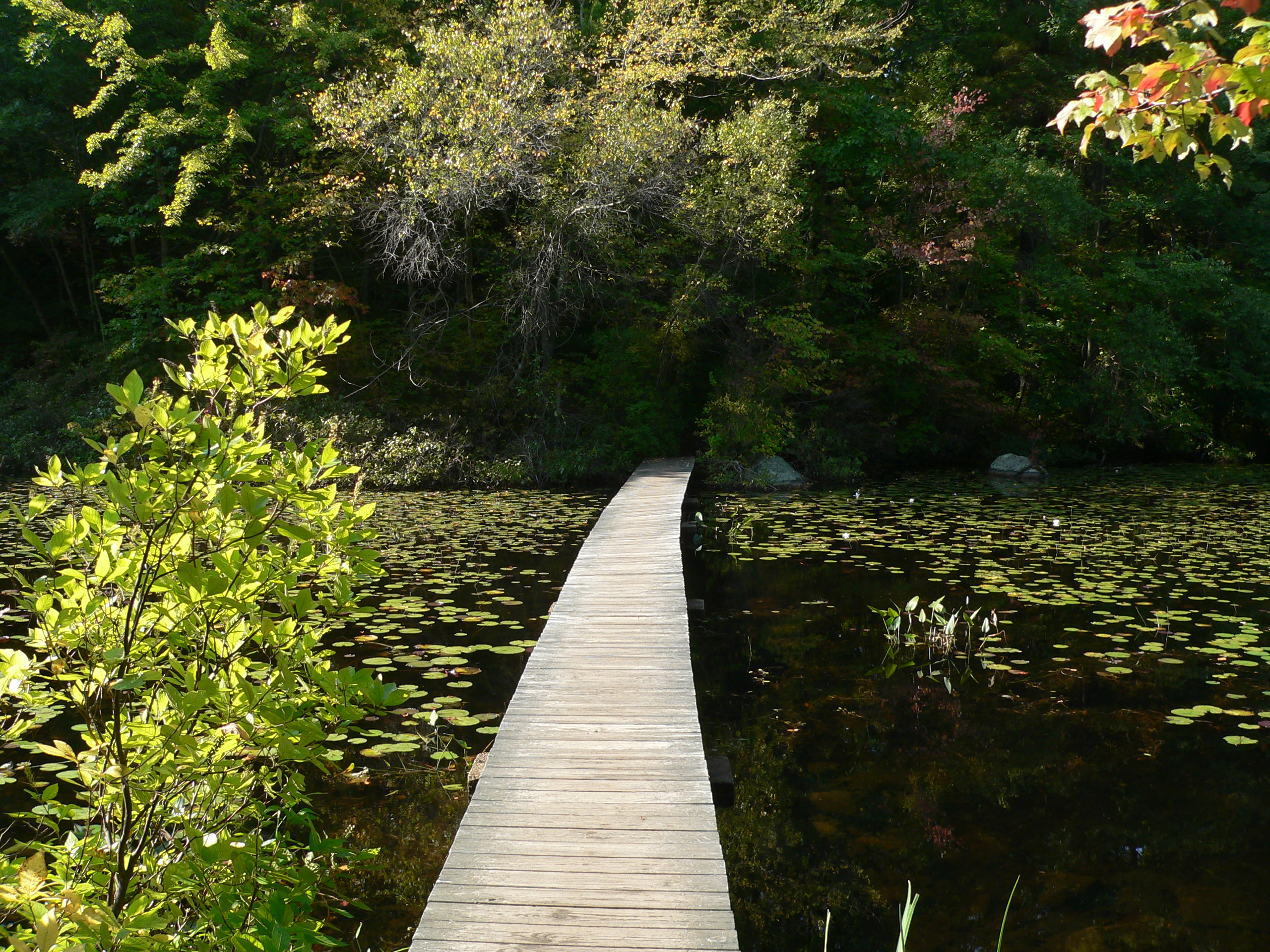
Echo Pond boardwalk

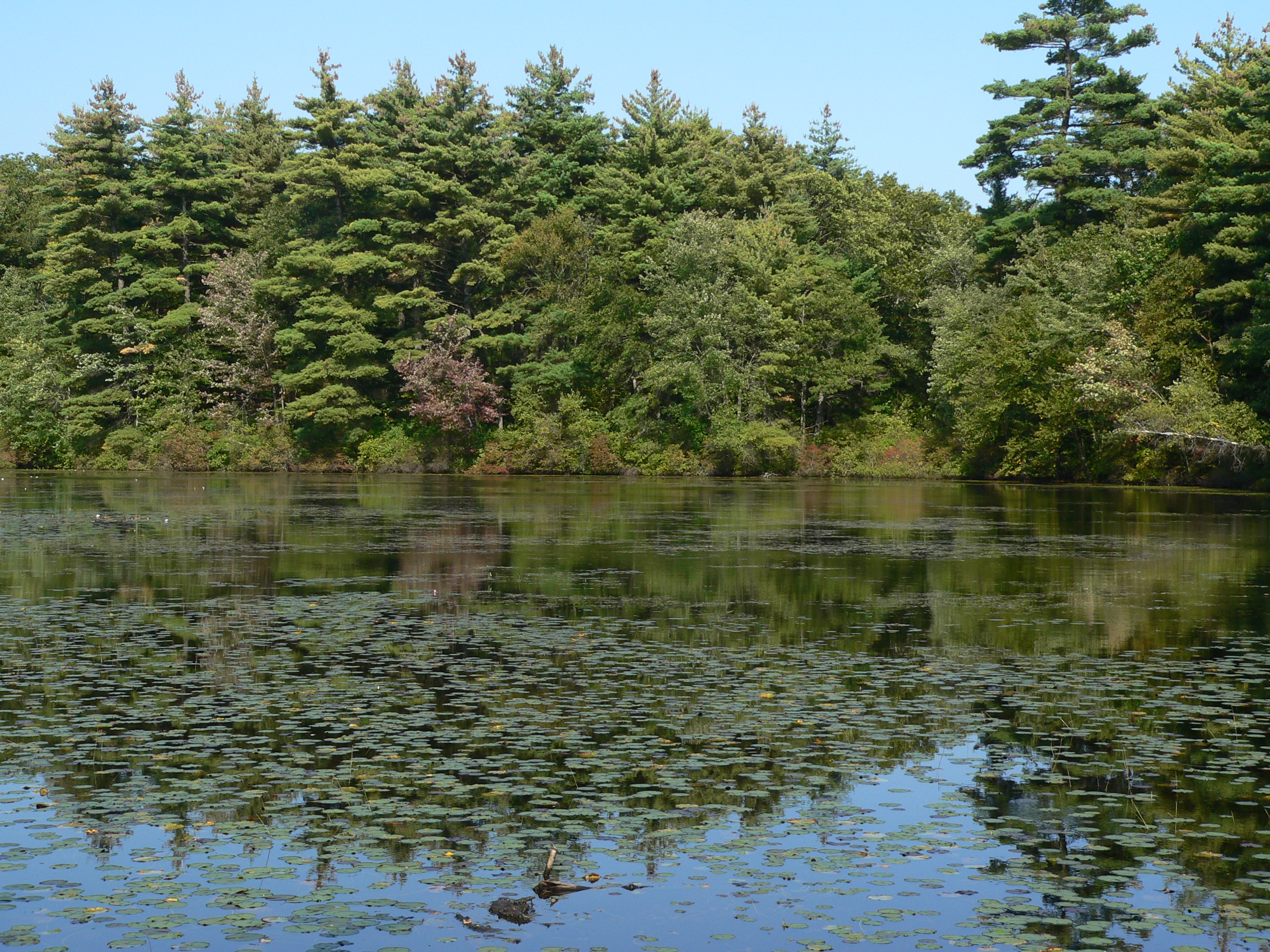
Echo Pond
