= Kokombis River =

River in Estrie, Quebec (Canada)

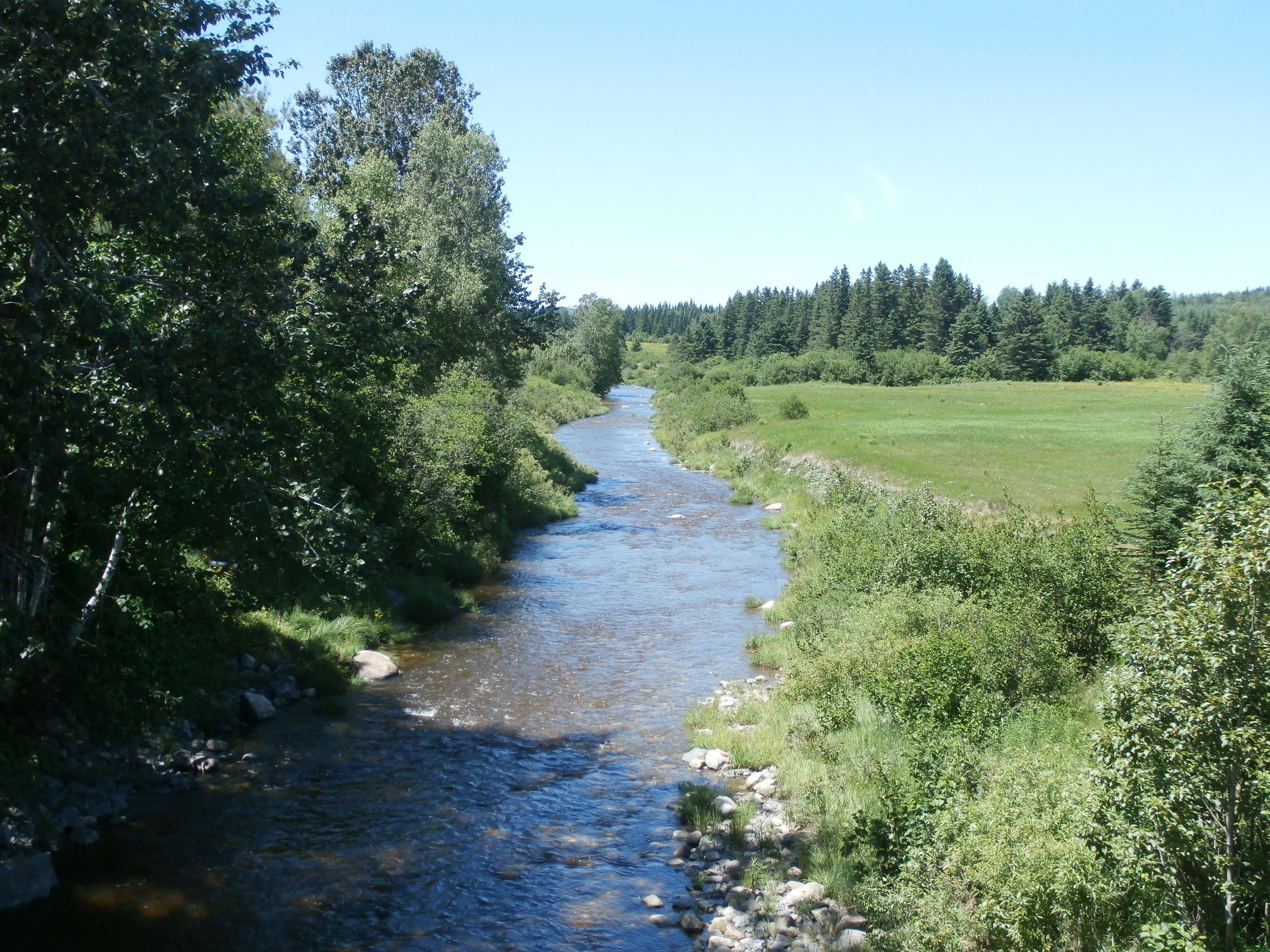
- Kokombis River downstream from the Highway 204 bridge in Frontenac.

- Location within Quebec

Location
- Country: Canada
- Province: Quebec
- Region: Estrie
- MRC: Le Granit Regional County Municipality

Physical characteristics
- Source: Mountain streams
  - location: Audet, (MRC) Le Granit Regional County Municipality, Québec
  - coordinates: 45.58207°N 70.669579°W
  - elevation: 565 metres (1,854 ft)
- Mouth: Nebnellis River
  - location: Frontenac
  - coordinates: 45.61306°N 70.80972°W
  - elevation: 370 metres (1,210 ft)
- Length: 10.0 kilometres (6.2 mi)

Basin features
- Progression: Nebnellis River, Chaudière River, St. Lawrence River
- River system: St. Lawrence River
- Tributaries
  - left: (upstream)
  - right: (upstream)

The Kokombis river (in French: rivière Kokombis) is a tributary of the east bank of the Nebnellis River which empties on the south-eastern bank of the Chaudière River; the latter flows northward to empty on the south shore of the St. Lawrence River.

The Kokombis River flows through the municipalities of Audet and Frontenac, in the Le Granit Regional County Municipality, in the administrative region of Estrie, in Quebec, in Canada.

== Geography ==
The main neighboring hydrographic slopes of the Kokombis river are:

- north side: Chaudière River, Nebnellis River, Samson River;
- east side: Nebnellis River, Samson River, Renards River;
- south side: rivière aux Araignées, rivière des Indiens;
- west side: Nebnellis River, lake Mégantic.

The Kokombis River has its source south of Mount Dostie, in a mountainous area in the southern part of the municipality of Audet, near the Canada-US border. This spring is located north of Lake Boundary Pond.

From its source, the Kokombis River flows over 10.0 kilometres (6.2 mi) divided into the following segments:

- 4.5 kilometres (2.8 mi) westward into Audet, to the municipal limit of Frontenac;
- 3.8 kilometres (2.4 mi) north-west, to route 204 whose bridge was rebuilt between June and October 2015.;
- 1.7 kilometres (1.1 mi) north-west, up to its confluence.

The Kokombis River empties on the east bank of the Nebnellis River which is a tributary of the southeast bank of the Chaudière River in the municipality of Frontenac.

== Toponymy ==
The toponym "Kokombis river" probably appeared for the first time in a survey report of the township of Spalding (1861) compiled by Amédée Duchesnay (1825-1881). The surveyor notes there: "I can cite, among others, the streams bearing the wild names of Nebnellis and Kokombis". This last Amerindianyme could derive, according to the geographer Philippe Charland, from "kikonebes" meaning "lake in the field".

The toponym Kokombis River was formalized on December 5, 1968, at the Commission de toponymie du Québec.

== See also ==
- List of rivers of Quebec
