= Mount Flat Top =

Mountain in Estrie, Quebec, Canada

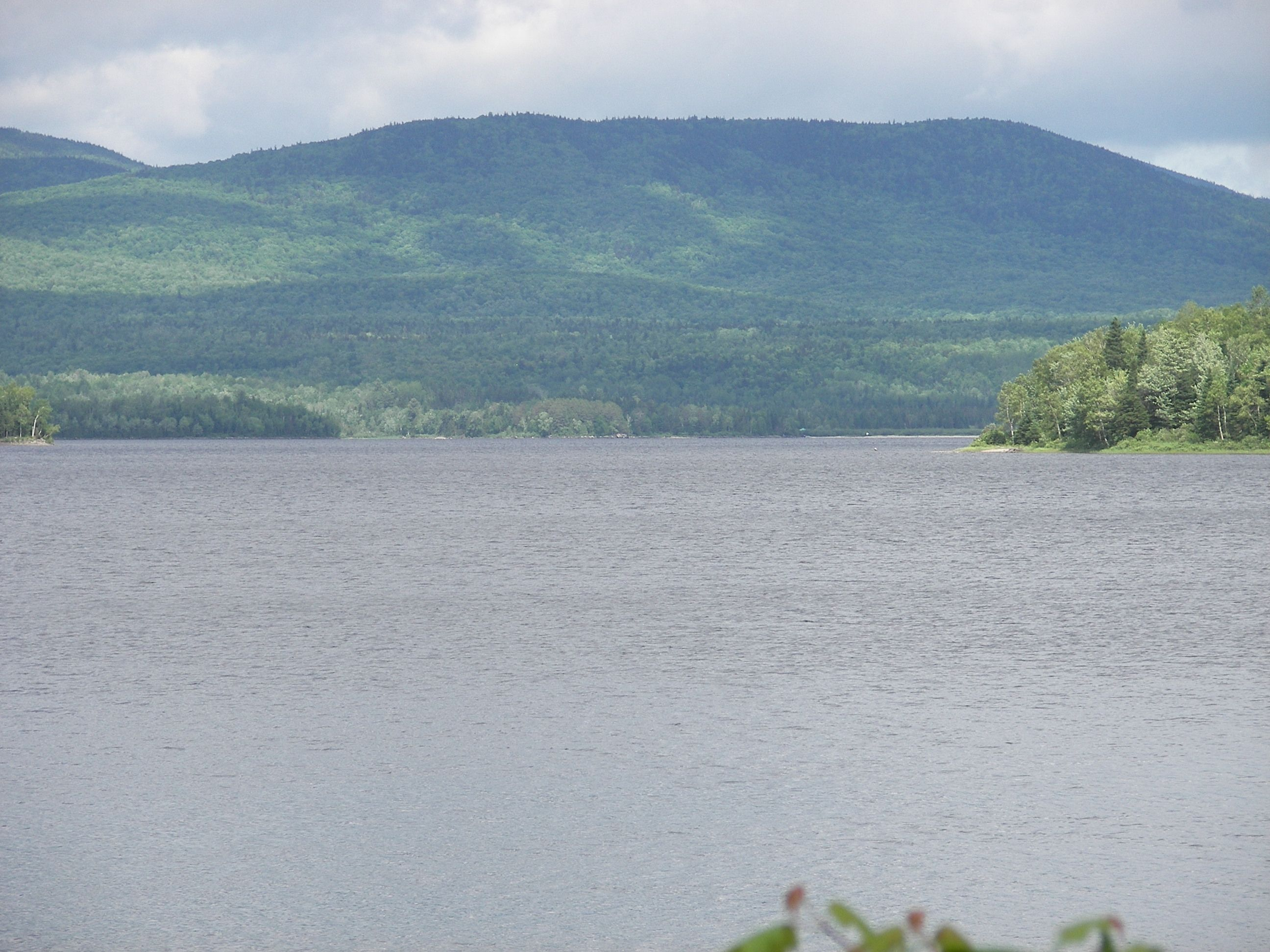
- View from Flat Top Mountain at the lac aux Araignées access point on route 161.

Highest point
- Peak: 830 metres (2,720 ft)
- Parent peak: White Mountains (Appalachian Mountains)
- Coordinates: 45°29′07″N 70°43′42″W

Geography
- Location: Estrie
- Country: Canada
- Province: Québec
- Region: Region

The Mount Flat Top is a mountain in administrative region of Estrie, in Quebec, Canada. It is part of the Appalachian Mountains; its altitude is 830 meters.

== Geography ==
The mountain is located in the municipality of Frontenac, in zec Louise-Gosford, east of lac aux Araignées, between Merrill Mountain and Moose Hill. It overlooks the rivière aux Araignées, as well as the lac aux Araignées.

== Toponymy ==
The toponym "Mont Flat Top" was formalized on December 5, 1968 by the Commission de toponymie du Québec.
