= Mount Rider =

Mountain in Estrie, Quebec, Canada

- Old name: Chapel Hill
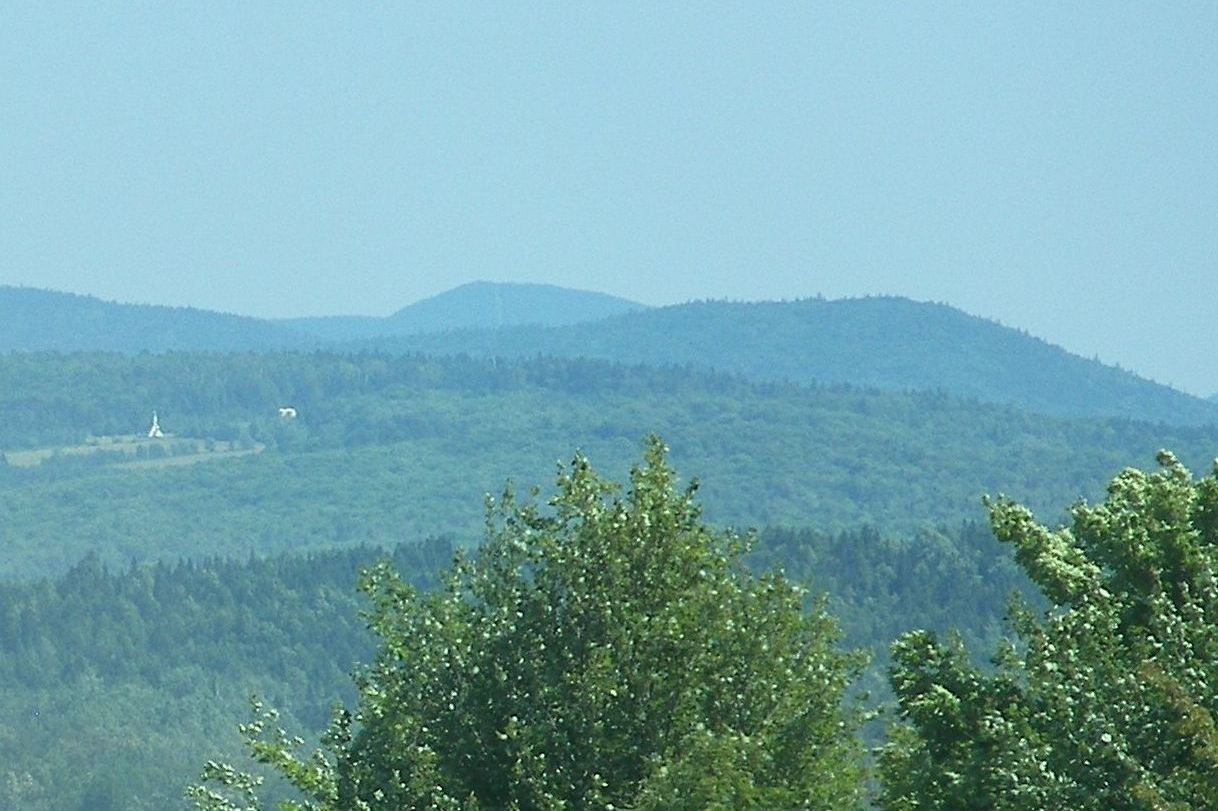
- View of Mount Rider.

Highest point
- Peak: 660 metres (2,170 ft)
- Parent peak: White Mountains (Appalachian Mountains)
- Coordinates: 45°31′52″N 70°47′07″W

Geography
- Location: Estrie
- Country: Canada
- Province: Québec
- Region: Region

Mount Rider is a mountain in the municipality of Frontenac, in Le Granit Regional County Municipality, Estrie, in Quebec, in Canada. This mount is part of the Appalachian Mountains; its altitude is 660 meters (2,170 ft).

== Geography ==
The mountain is located in range 4 which leads to lac aux Araignées in the municipality of Frontenac. The Saint John's Chapel is located near its summit at 620 meters above sea level.

== Toponymy ==
The toponym "Mont Rider" was formalized on December 5, 1968 by the Commission de toponymie du Québec.
