= Merrill Mountain =

Mountain in Maine, U.S. and Quebec, Canada

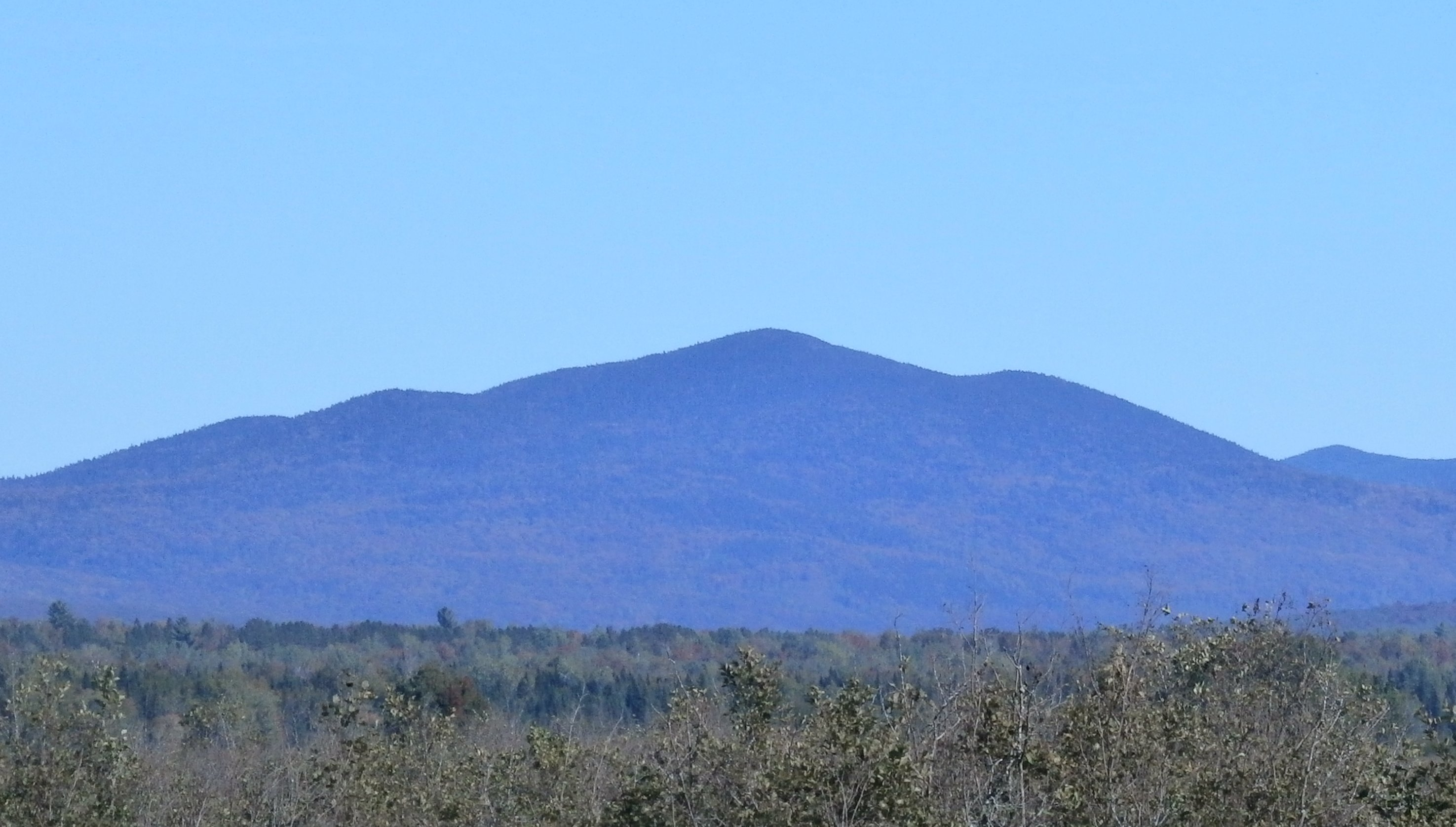
- View of Merrill Mountain from Chemin de la Rivière-Bergeron, at Piopolis, Quebec, to the west

Highest point
- Elevation: 997 m (3,271 ft)
- Parent peak: White Mountains (Appalachian Mountains)
- Coordinates: 45°28′27″N 70°41′32″W

Geography
- Location: Estrie; Franklin County
- Countries: Canada; United States
- Province U.S. state: Québec; Maine
- Region(s): Region; County

Merrill Mountain (French: Montagne Merrill) is a mountain on the border between the Canadian province of Quebec, in the region of Estrie, and the U.S. state of Maine, which is part of the Appalachian Mountains; its altitude is 997 m (3,271 ft).

== Geography ==
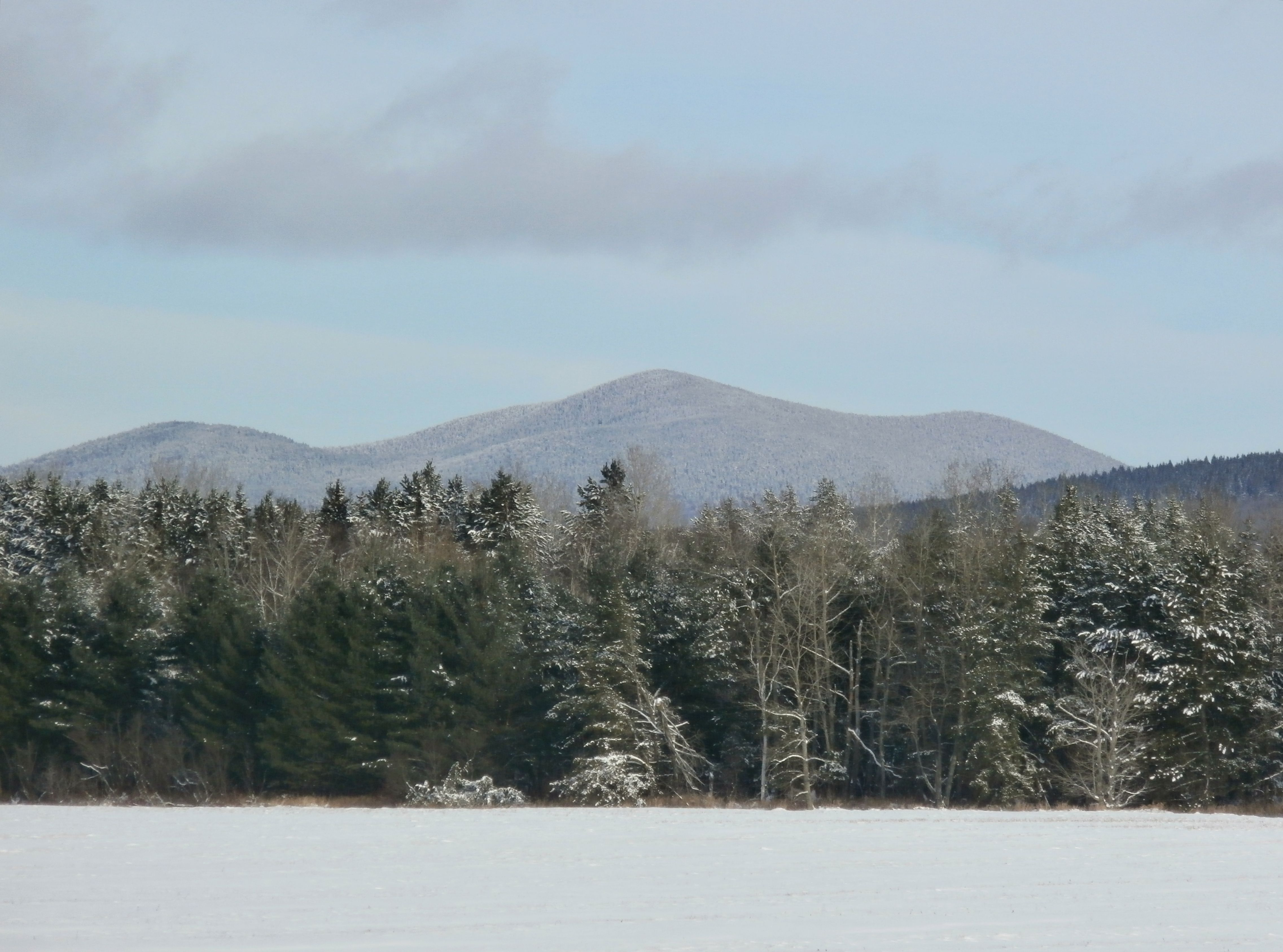
Merrill Mountain in winter

The mountain, located in the municipality of Frontenac, on the zec Louise-Gosford east of lac aux Araignées, is crossed by the Canada–United States border.

== Toponymy ==
The toponym "Montagne Merrill" was formalized on November 7, 1985, by the Commission de toponymie du Québec.

== See also ==
- List of mountain ranges of Quebec
