= Mount Pisgah (Quebec) =

Mountain in Maine, United States of America

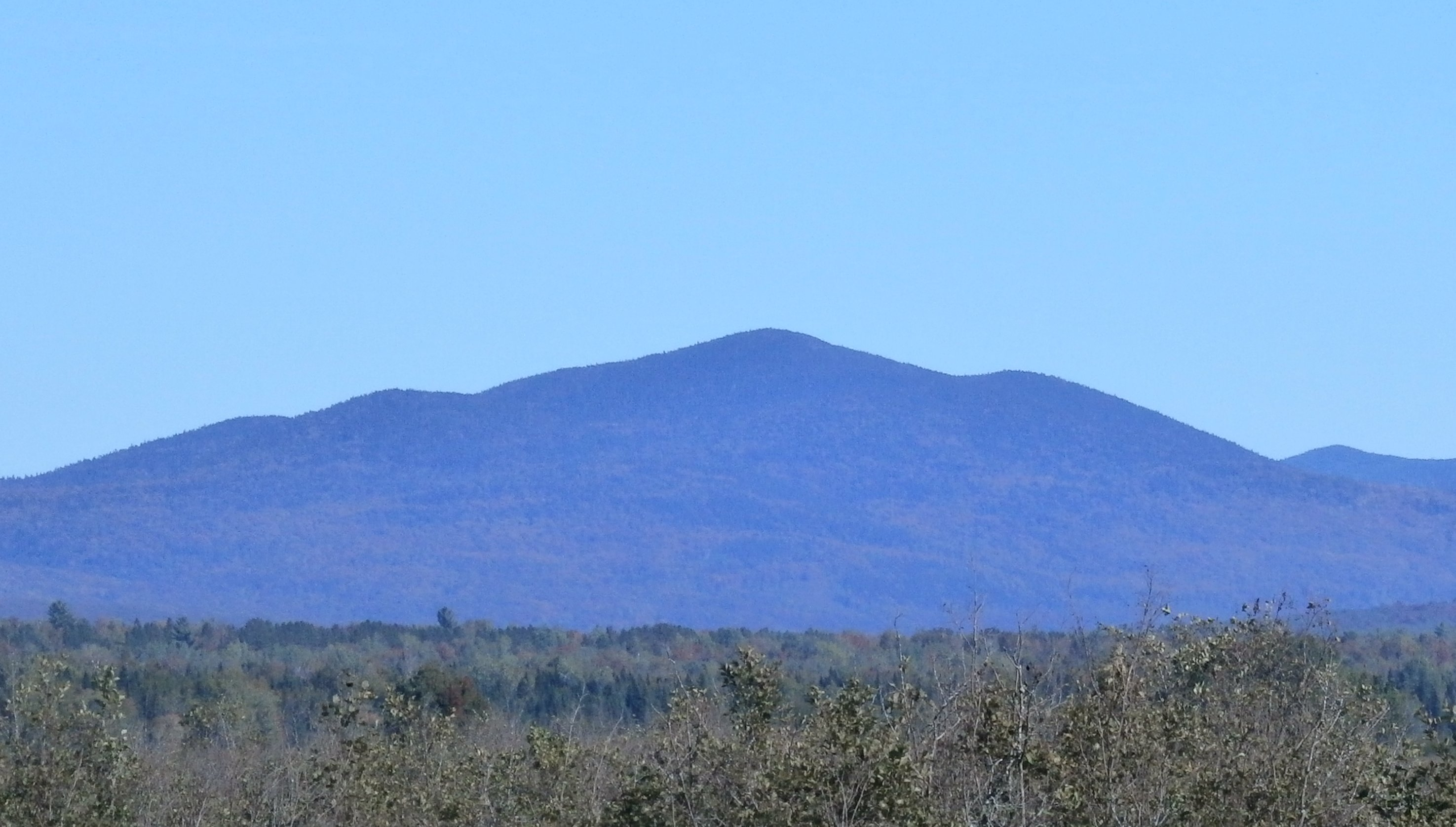
- View of Mont Pisgah, from rang Saint-Joseph, in Nantes.

Highest point
- Peak: 1,023 metres (3,356 ft)
- Parent peak: White Mountains (Appalachian Mountains)
- Coordinates: 45°22′44″N 70°39′41″W

Geography
- Location within Maine Location within Quebec
- Location: Estrie; Franklin County
- Countries: Canada; United States
- Province U.S. state: Québec; Maine
- Region(s): Region; County
- Topo map: NTS 21E7 Woburn

Mount Pisgah (French: Mont Pisgah) is a mountain on the border between the Canadian province of Quebec, in the region of Estrie, and the American state of Maine (United States United), which is part of the Appalachian Mountains; it rises to 1,023 metres (3,356 ft) of altitude.

== Geography ==
The mountain, located in part in the municipality of Saint-Augustin-de-Woburn, southeast of lac aux Araignées, is crossed by the Canada–United States border. The southern flank slopes medium down to the Chaîne des Lacs (Chain of Ponds), which is crossed by the northern branch of the Dead River.

== Toponymy ==
The toponym "Mont Pisgah" was formalized on December 5, 1968, by the Commission de toponymie du Québec.

== Gallery ==
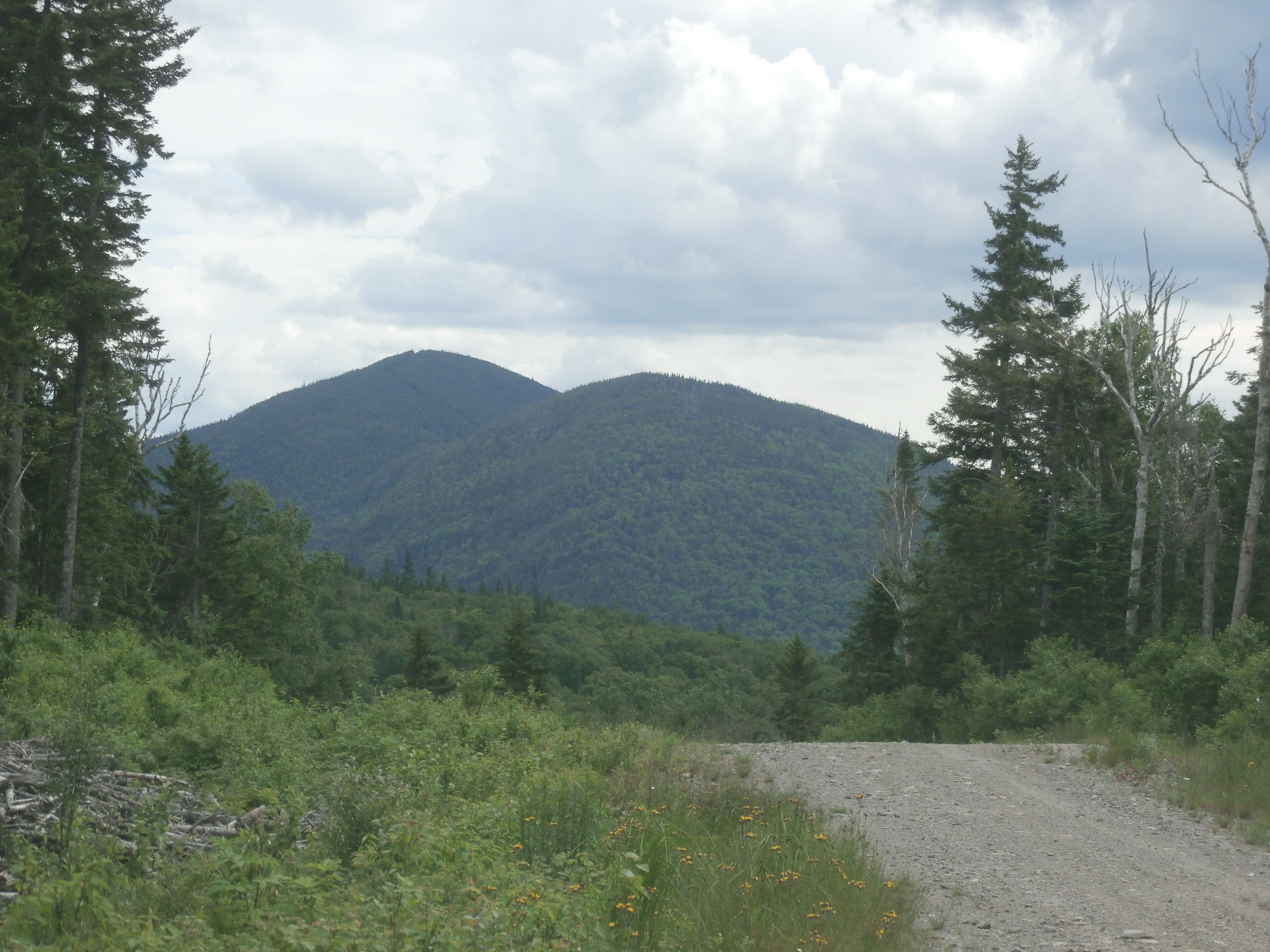
Mont Pisgah south of the Zec Louise-Gosford (Louise sector)
