= Rivière des Indiens =

River in Estrie, Quebec (Canada)

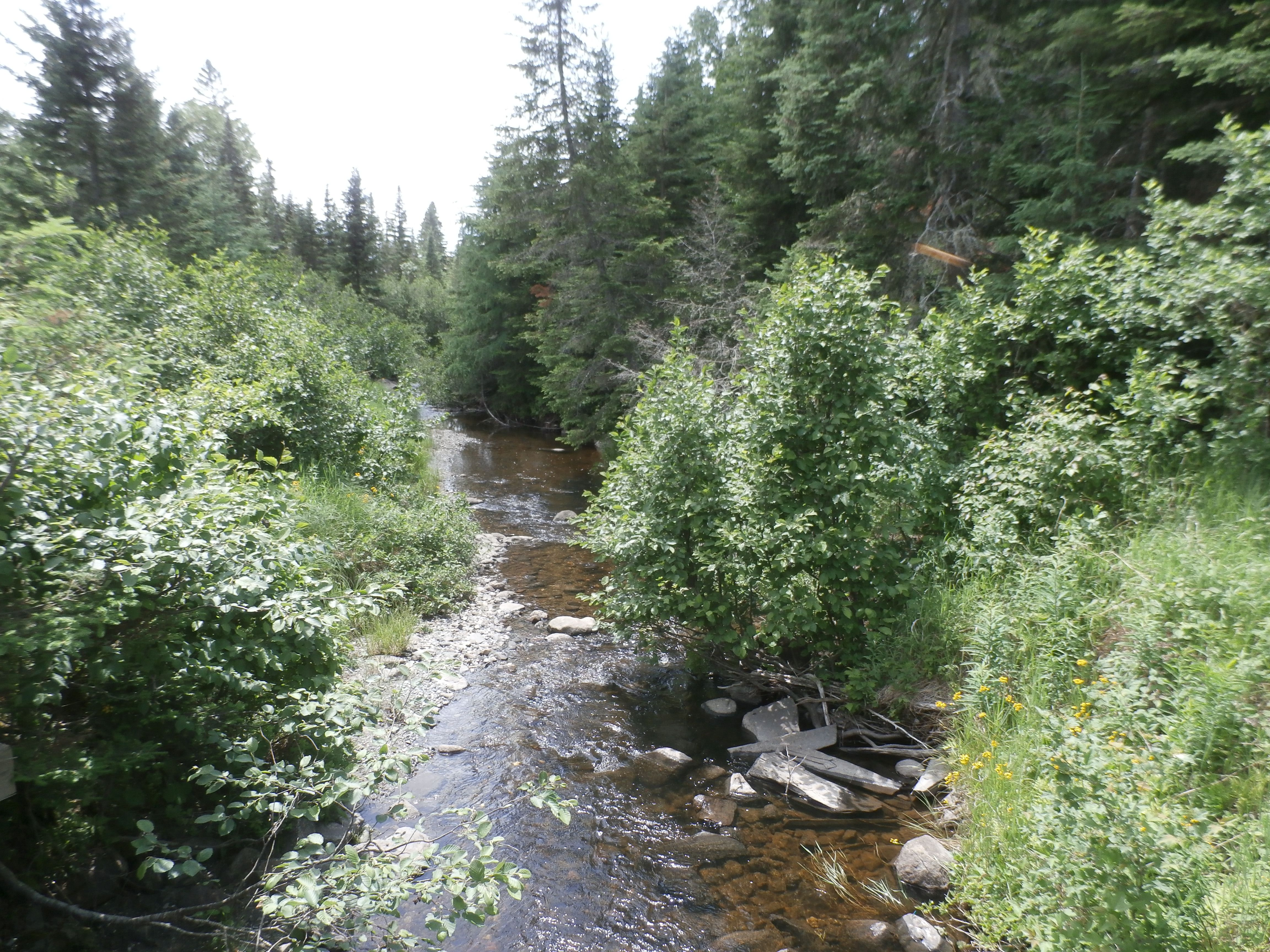
- East branch of the Indians River at the Rang 4 bridge near Spider Lake.

- Location within Quebec

Location
- Country: Canada
- Province: Quebec
- Region: Estrie
- MRC: Le Granit Regional County Municipality

Physical characteristics
- Source: Mountain streams
  - location: Frontenac, (MRC) Le Granit Regional County Municipality, Québec
  - coordinates: 45.52702°N 70.795169°W
  - elevation: 555 metres (1,821 ft)
- Mouth: Lac aux Araignées
  - location: Frontenac
  - coordinates: 45.48694°N 70.80222°W
  - elevation: 400 metres (1,300 ft)
- Length: 4.8 kilometres (3.0 mi)

Basin features
- Progression: Lac aux Araignées, Rivière aux Araignées, Lake Mégantic, Chaudière River, St. Lawrence River
- River system: St. Lawrence River
- Tributaries
  - left: (upstream)
  - right: (upstream)

The rivière des Indiens (in English: Indians River) is a tributary of the north shore of lac aux Araignées in the municipality of Frontenac, in the Le Granit Regional County Municipality, in the administrative region of Estrie, in Quebec in Canada.

== Toponymy ==
The toponym “rivière des Indiens” was made official on December 5, 1968, at the Commission de toponymie du Québec.

== See also ==
- List of rivers of Quebec
