= Lac aux Araignées =

Lake in Estrie, Quebec (Canada)

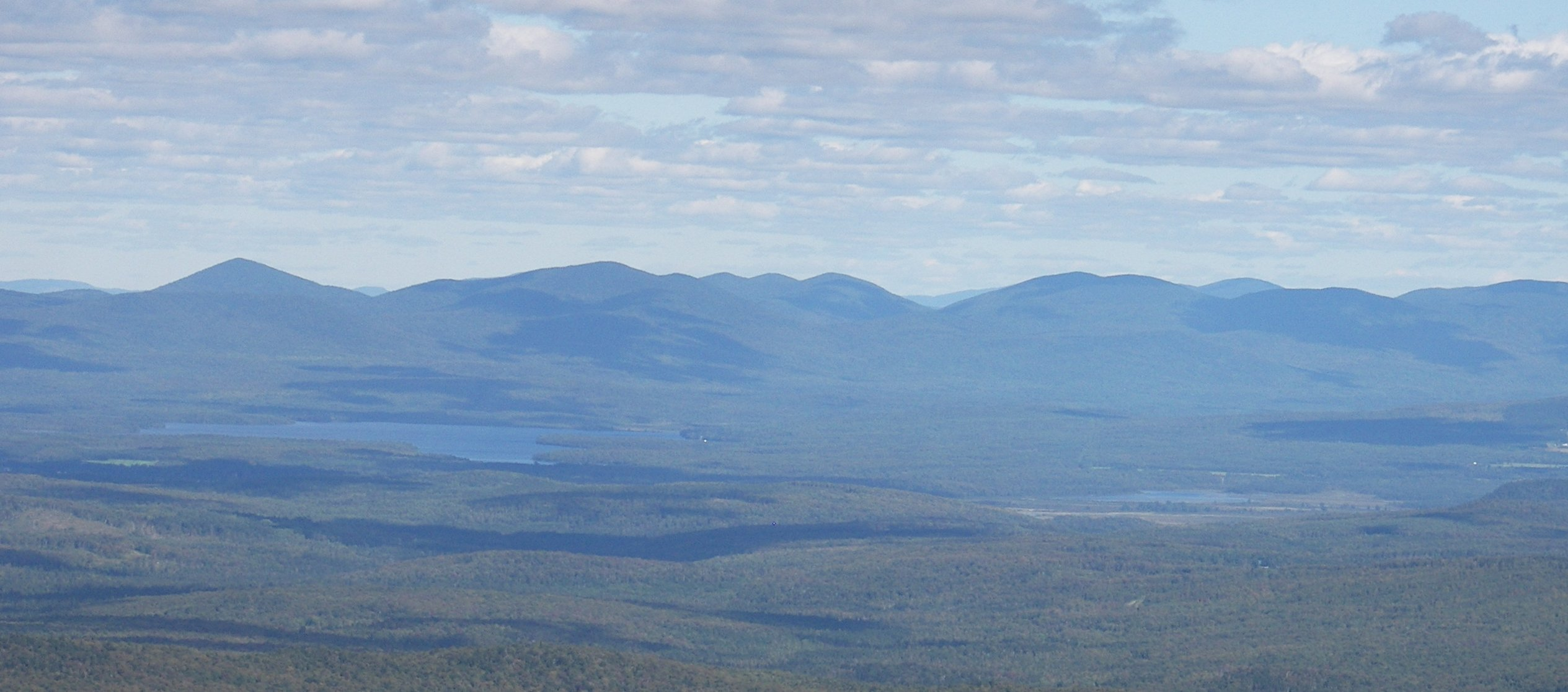
- Lac aux Araignées and the surrounding mountains

- Location within Quebec
- Location: Le Granit Regional County Municipality, Estrie, Quebec, Canada
- Coordinates: 45.47472°N 70.81277°W
- Primary outflows: Rivière aux Araignées
- Catchment area: 23.2 kilometres (14.4 mi)
- Max. length: 5.5 kilometres (3.4 mi)
- Max. width: 3.9 kilometres (2.4 mi)
- Surface area: 8.72 kilometres (5.42 mi)
- Surface elevation: 406 metres (1,332 ft)
- Frozen: Surface of the lake is generally frozen from mid-December to mid-March

Lac aux Araignées (in English: Spyder Lake) is a lake located in the municipality of Frontenac, in the Le Granit Regional County Municipality (MRC), in Quebec, in Canada.

== Geography ==
It has a surface area of 8.72 kilometres (5.42 mi), and a perimeter of 23.2 kilometres (14.4 mi). Its altitude is 406 metres (1,332 ft), its length is 5.5 kilometres (3.4 mi) and its width is 3.9 kilometres (2.4 mi). Its catchment area is 150 kilometres (93.21 mi). Part of the Zec Louise-Gosford is located near the lake. Its main tributaries are: the rivière aux Araignées, the rivière des Indiens and Meads Creek which is fed by many small tributaries whose sources come from the flanks of the mountains, Moose Hill (888 metres (2,913 ft)), Mount Merrill (997 metres (3,271 ft)), Mount Caribou (1,110 metres (3,640 ft)), Mount Pisgah (1,023 metres (3,356 ft)), and the Mont Louise (755 metres (2,477 ft)). These mountains surround a valley which constitutes its watershed. The outlet of the lake passes through lac des Joncs (Mégantic), a pond adjacent to an area of the swamp south of lac Mégantic.

== Toponymy ==
The lake is called this because of its shape; its many bays in fact give it the shape of a spider. In addition to "Pointe Thomas", the south coast of the lake has a regular shape, while the north coast is indented by four bays, namely Clarke bay, Boyle bay, the bay of the rivière des Indiens and a last one further east. These bays on the north shore are separated by three land projections.

The term "spiders" has also been associated with the river and one of its islands.

In 1775, during the invasion of Canada, the armed troops of General Benedict Arnold struggled in their crossing of the lake because of the marshy surroundings. Documents from this period refer to the lake as "nepis", a term inspired by nebes or nebesek, meaning pond, lake or swamp.

On their geographical map of 1795, Gale and Duberger write the designation “Mecanicamack L.”. In 1815, the cartographer Joseph Bouchette changed the spelling of the initial appellation in the form of Macanamack. This toponym contains the elements of the language of the Abenakis which is related to the meaning of "marshy lake". In the first half of the 19th century, in the process of surveying the townships, the particular shape of this body of water inspired the name "Spider Lake".

== Megantic Fish and Game Corporation ==
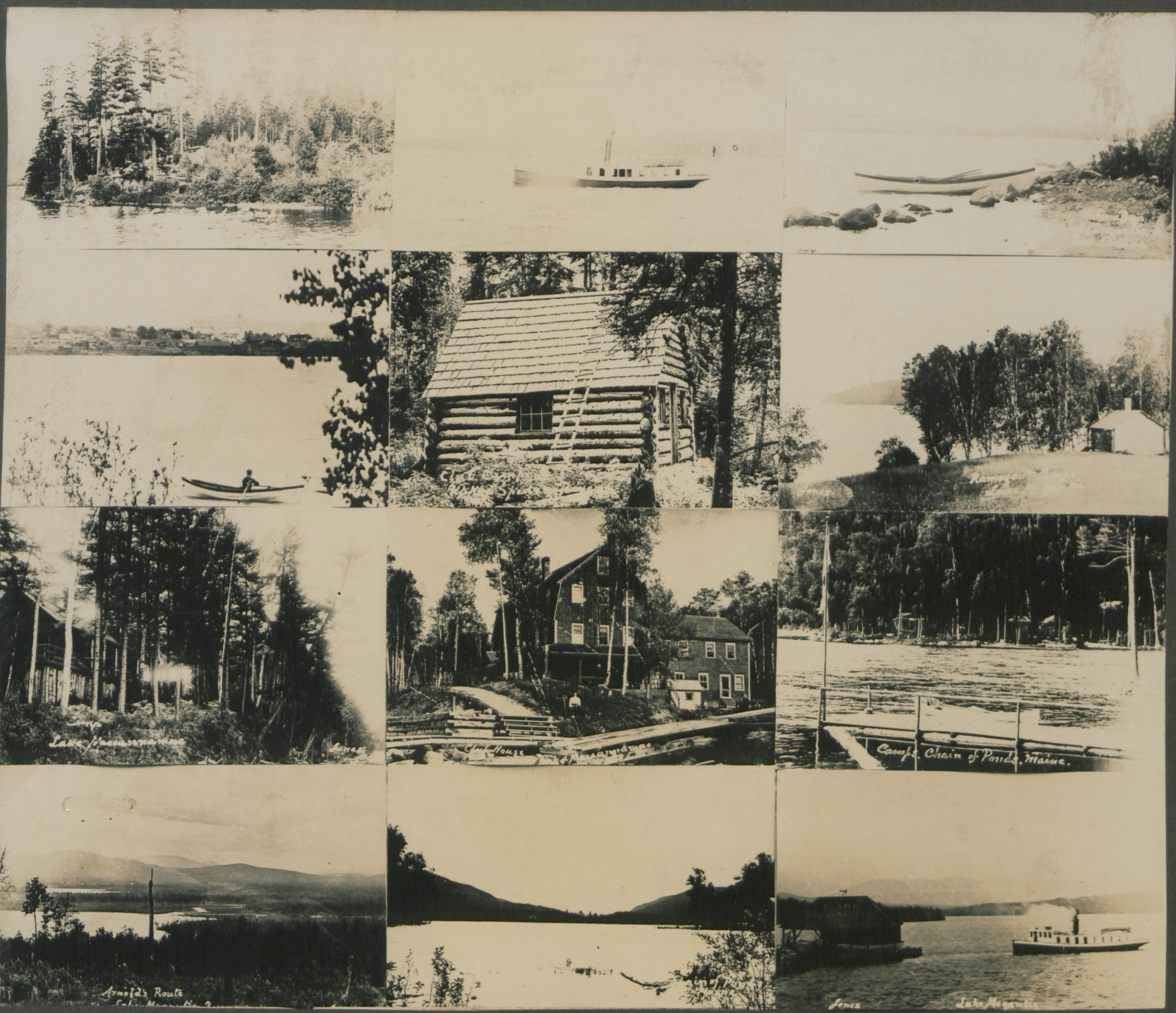
Several photos of the lake in 1913.

In 1887, the Megantic Fish and Game Corporation was founded and a vast territory including Lac Mégantic was included in the hunting and fishing club; the vast territory also included part of Maine. The hamlet of Trois-Lacs included a small road which allows to take the steamer Lena which made the transport on Lac Mégantic; another small steamboat, on Lac aux Araignées, transported travelers to the Macannamac Hotel, an imposing 3-story building, where a large hall included an imposing fireplace or burned a wood fire, with guides who were available for hunting and fishing. Cabins were also available for rental for the 250 club members. In 1914, the lake is listed under the name of Spider in the "Dictionary of rivers and lakes of the province of Quebec".

The French use of the translated form "Lac aux Araignées" was established, it seems, in the 1920s and subsequently became official. The map of the electoral District of Beauce (1924) indicates “L. Araignée”, translation closer to the English form of the toponym.

The toponym "lac aux Araignées" was made official on December 5, 1968, at the Commission de toponymie du Québec.

== Fauna ==
In the lake there are smallmouth bass, perch, rainbow trout, and speckled trout.

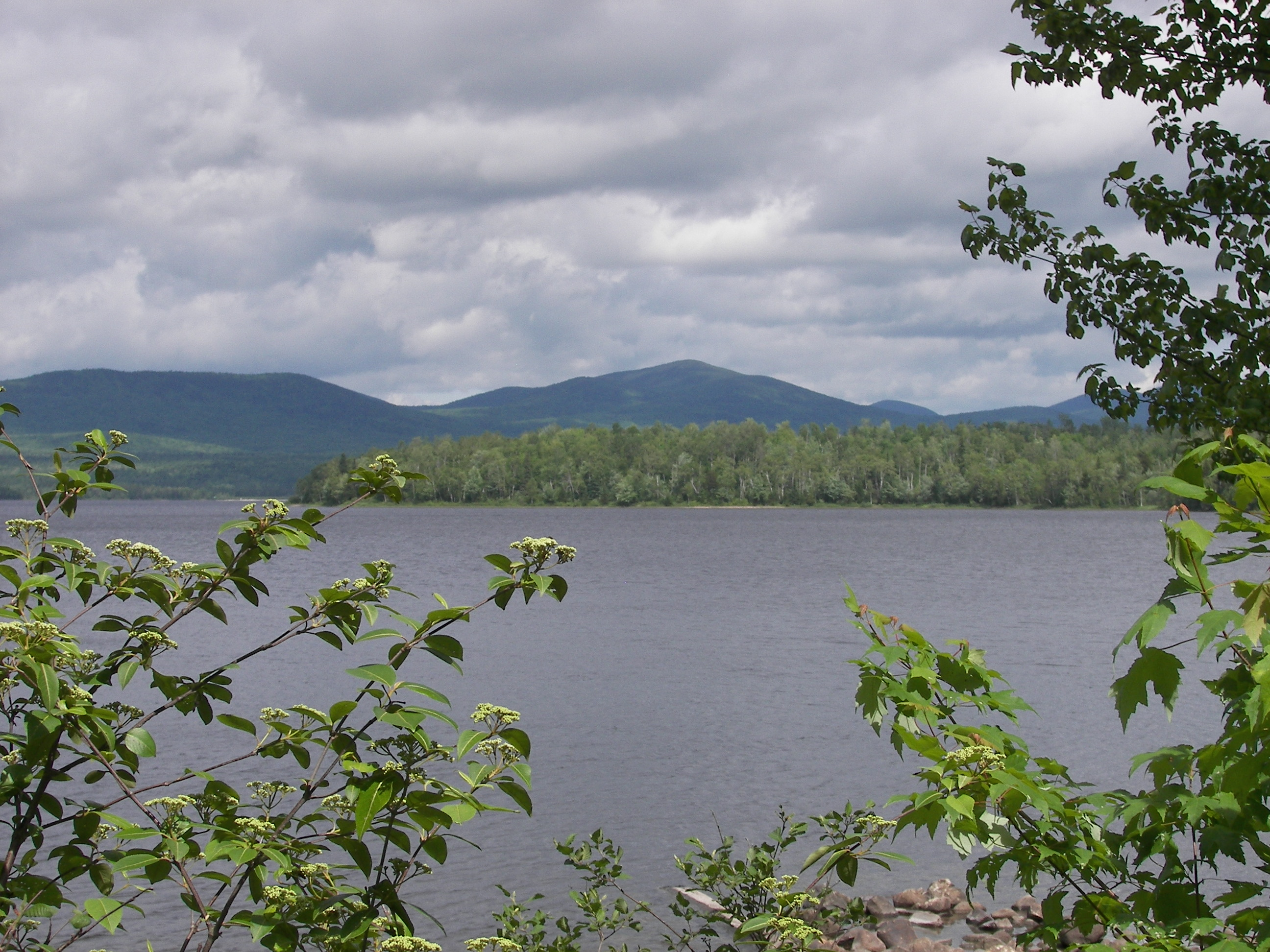
Lac Aux Araignées, public access point route 161. Mount Flat Top (830 meters) on the left; and Merrill (997 meters) in the center, background.

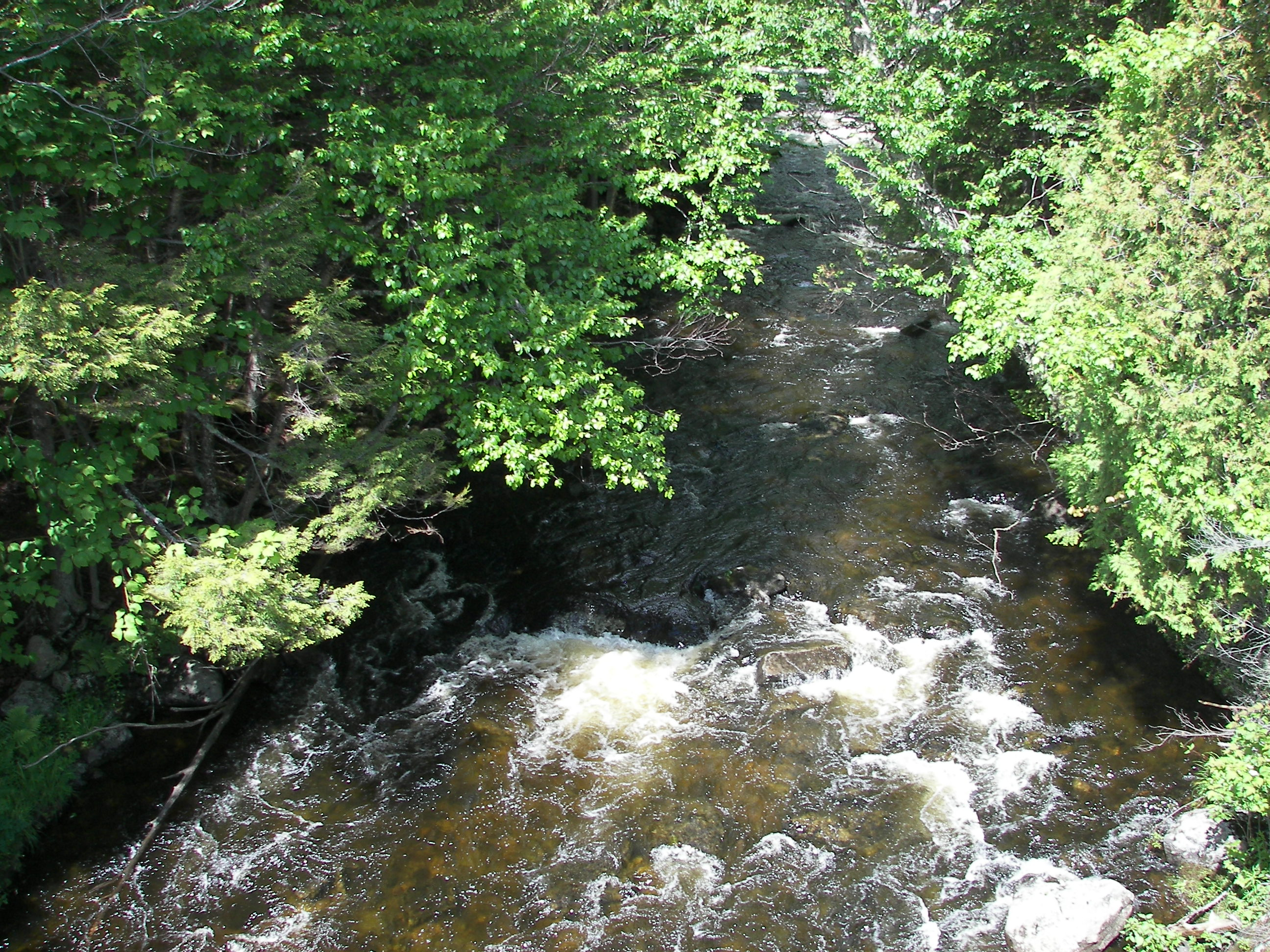
Décharge du lac aux Araignées, entre le lac et le pont route 161.

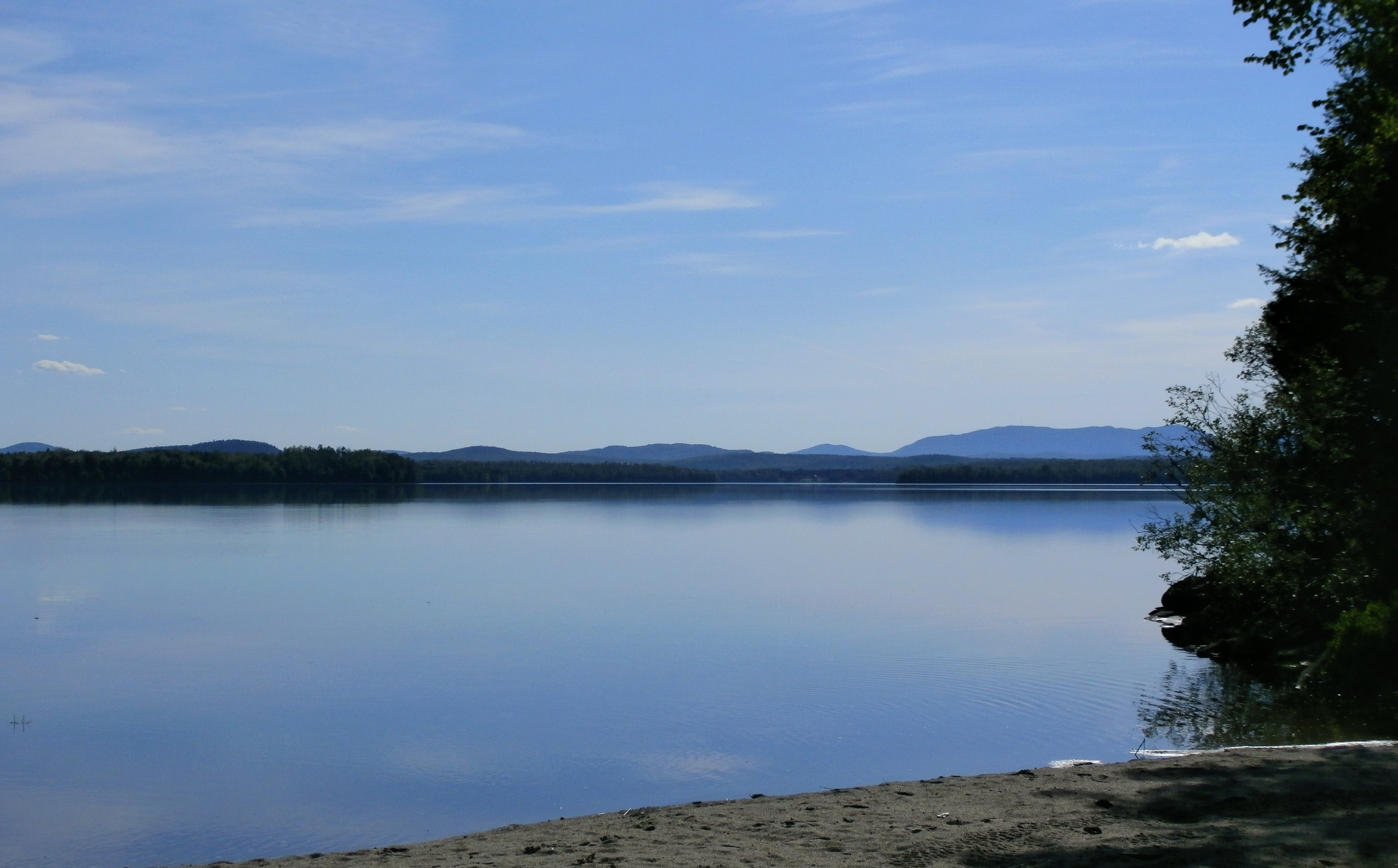
Lac aux Araignées in rang 4 in Frontenac.

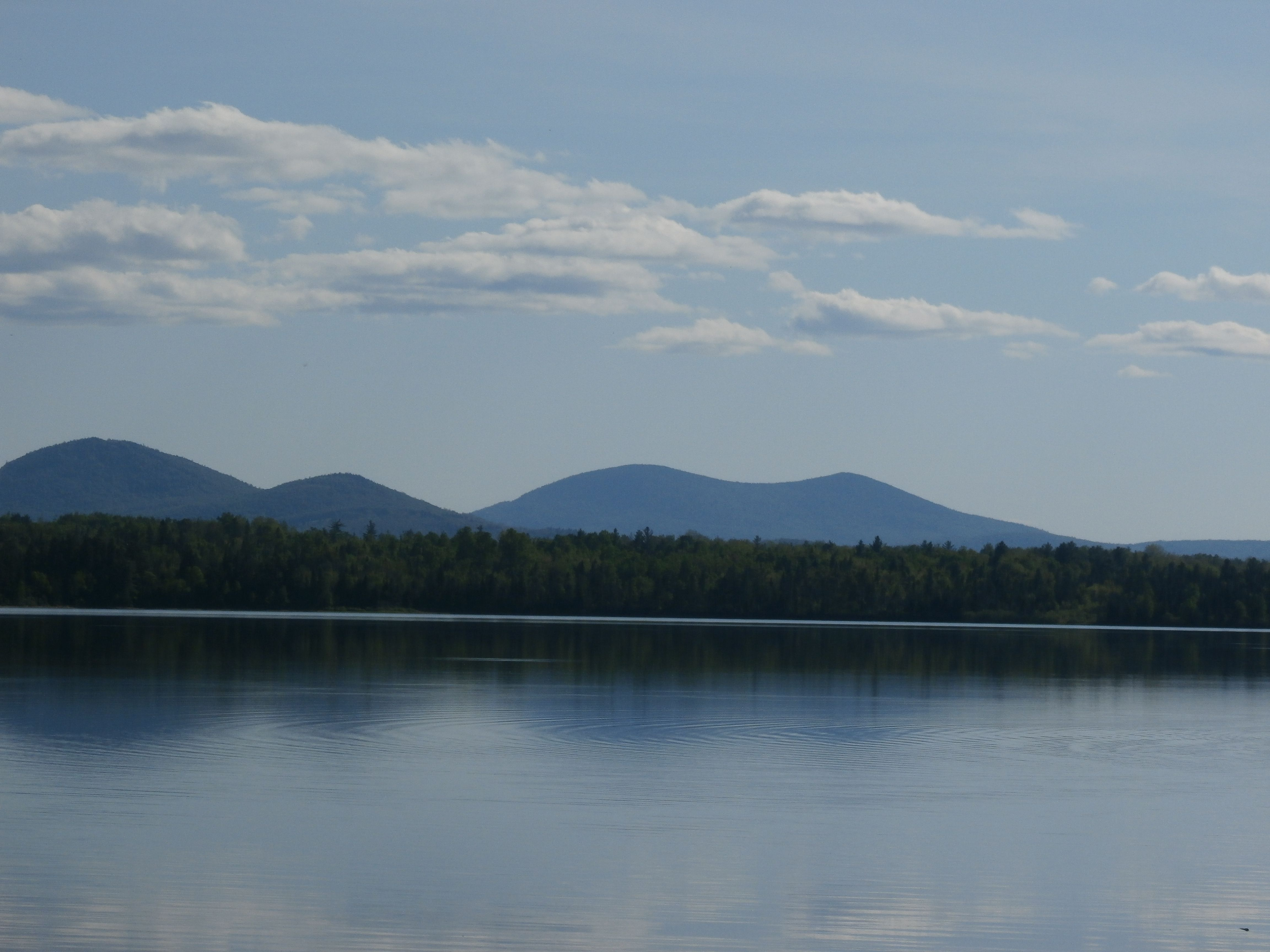
Lac aux Araignées in rang 4.
