= Lac des Joncs (Mégantic) =

Lake in Estrie, Quebec (Canada)

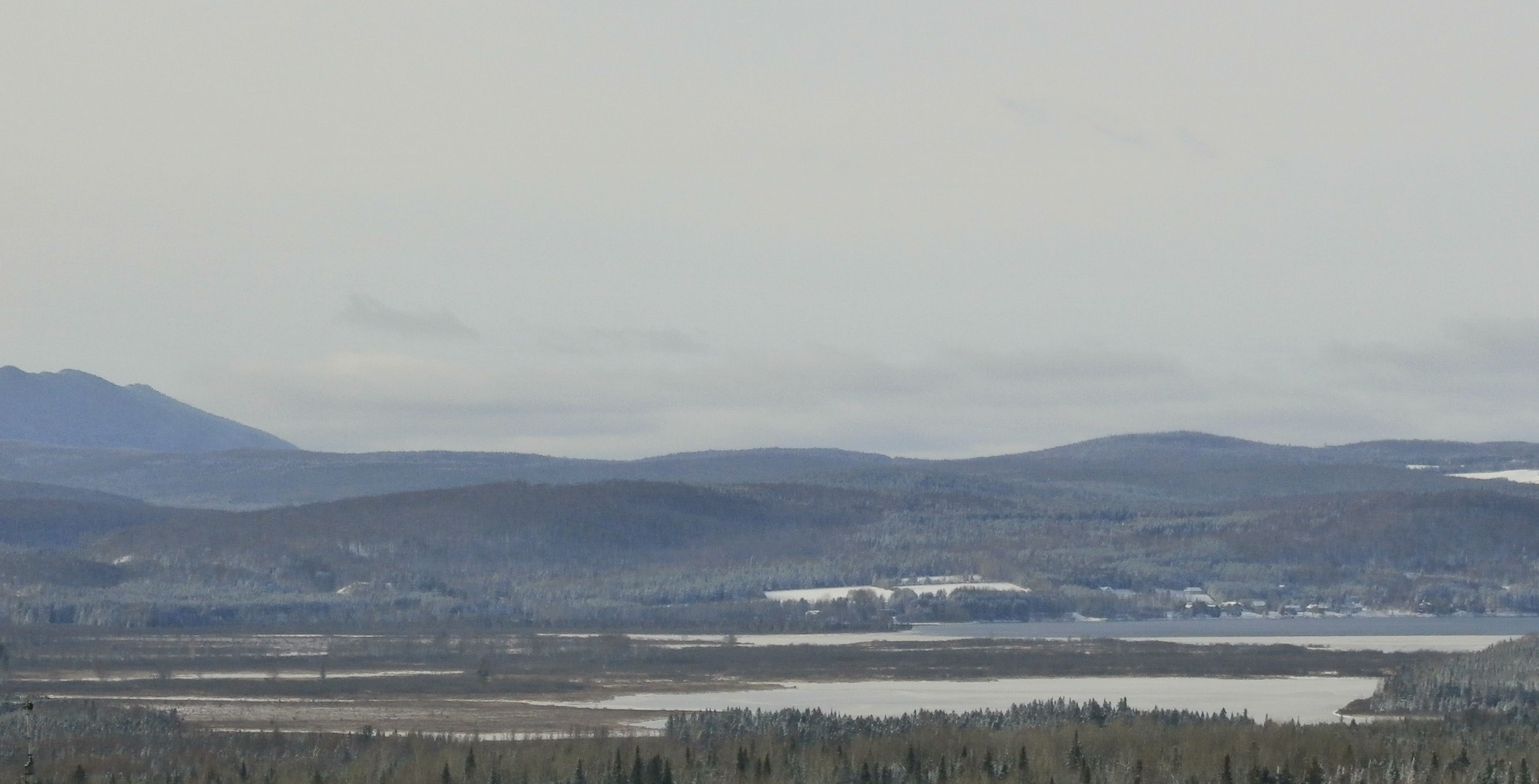
- The Lac des Joncs covered with ice, in the foreground, surrounded by the also frozen marsh. The unfrozen part at the back is Lac Mégantic. (view from Chemin Louise-Bocage).

- Location within Quebec
- Location: Le Granit Regional County Municipality, Estrie, Quebec, Canada
- Coordinates: 45.45072°N 70.84977°W
- Primary inflows: Rivière aux Araignées
- Primary outflows: Rivière aux Araignées
- Max. length: 1.0 kilometre (0.62 mi)
- Max. width: 0.6 kilometres (0.37 mi)
- Surface elevation: 395 metres (1,296 ft)
- Frozen: Surface of the lake is generally frozen from mid-December to mid-March

The lac des Joncs (in English: Joncs lake) is a pond marshy located in the municipality of Piopolis, in the Le Granit Regional County Municipality, in Estrie in Quebec, Canada.

== Geography ==
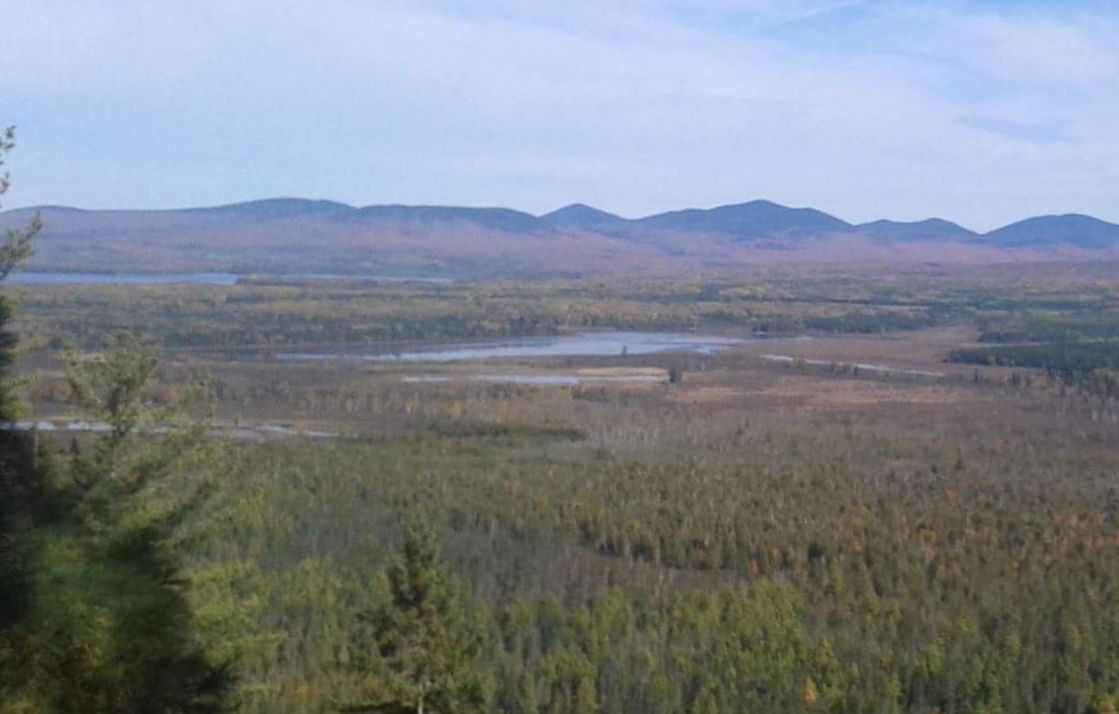
Seen from the Mont Scotch Cap, the marsh, the Joncs lake (Mégantic) in the center; Spider Lake is in the back left.

Its altitude is 395 metres (1,296 ft), its length is 1 kilometre (0.62 mi) and its width 600 metres (2,000 ft). It is part of the Marais of Lac Mégantic, which has an approximate area of 5 km^{2} (1.9 sq mi). The pond is located between Lac aux Araignées and Lake Mégantic. Its main tributaries are: the rivière aux Araignées, which crosses the pond, at its exit takes the name of the outlet of Lac des Joncs, and is joined by the Arnold River to the south of Lac Mégantic. Nearly 127 species of birds frequent the surroundings of all the lakes and marshes, in particular the brent geese during migration and the bald eagle, a rare species in Quebec.
