= Nebnellis River =

River in Estrie, Quebec (Canada)

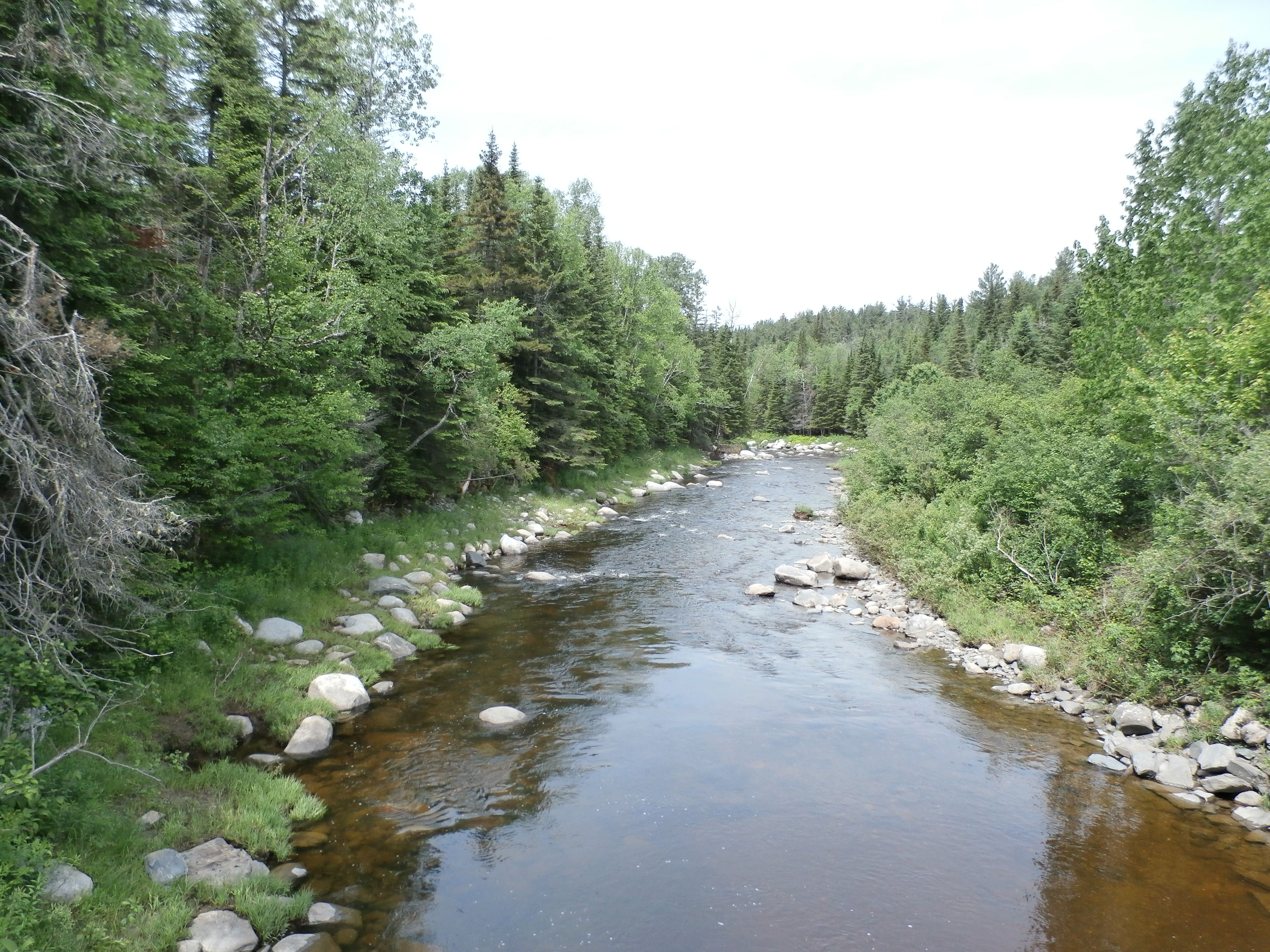
- Nebnellis River downstream from Chemin du Barrage towards the confluence with Rivière Chaudière.

- Location within Quebec

Location
- Country: Canada
- Province: Quebec
- Region: Estrie
- MRC: Le Granit Regional County Municipality

Physical characteristics
- Source: Mountain streams
  - location: Frontenac, (MRC) Le Granit Regional County Municipality, Québec
  - coordinates: 45.548304°N 70.692431°W
  - elevation: 563 metres (1,847 ft)
- Mouth: Chaudière River
  - location: Frontenac
  - coordinates: 45.63667°N 70.82278°W
  - elevation: 347 metres (1,138 ft)
- Length: 18.1 kilometres (11.2 mi)

Basin features
- Progression: Chaudière River, St. Lawrence River
- River system: St. Lawrence River
- Tributaries
  - left: (upstream)
  - right: (upstream)

The Nebnellis river (in French: rivière Nebnellis) is a tributary of the south-eastern shore of the Chaudière River which flows northward to empty onto the south shore of the St. Lawrence River.

== Toponymy ==
The toponym Rivière Nebnellis was formalized on December 5, 1968, at the Commission de toponymie du Québec.

== See also ==
- List of rivers of Quebec
