= Audet, Quebec =

Audet
- Municipality
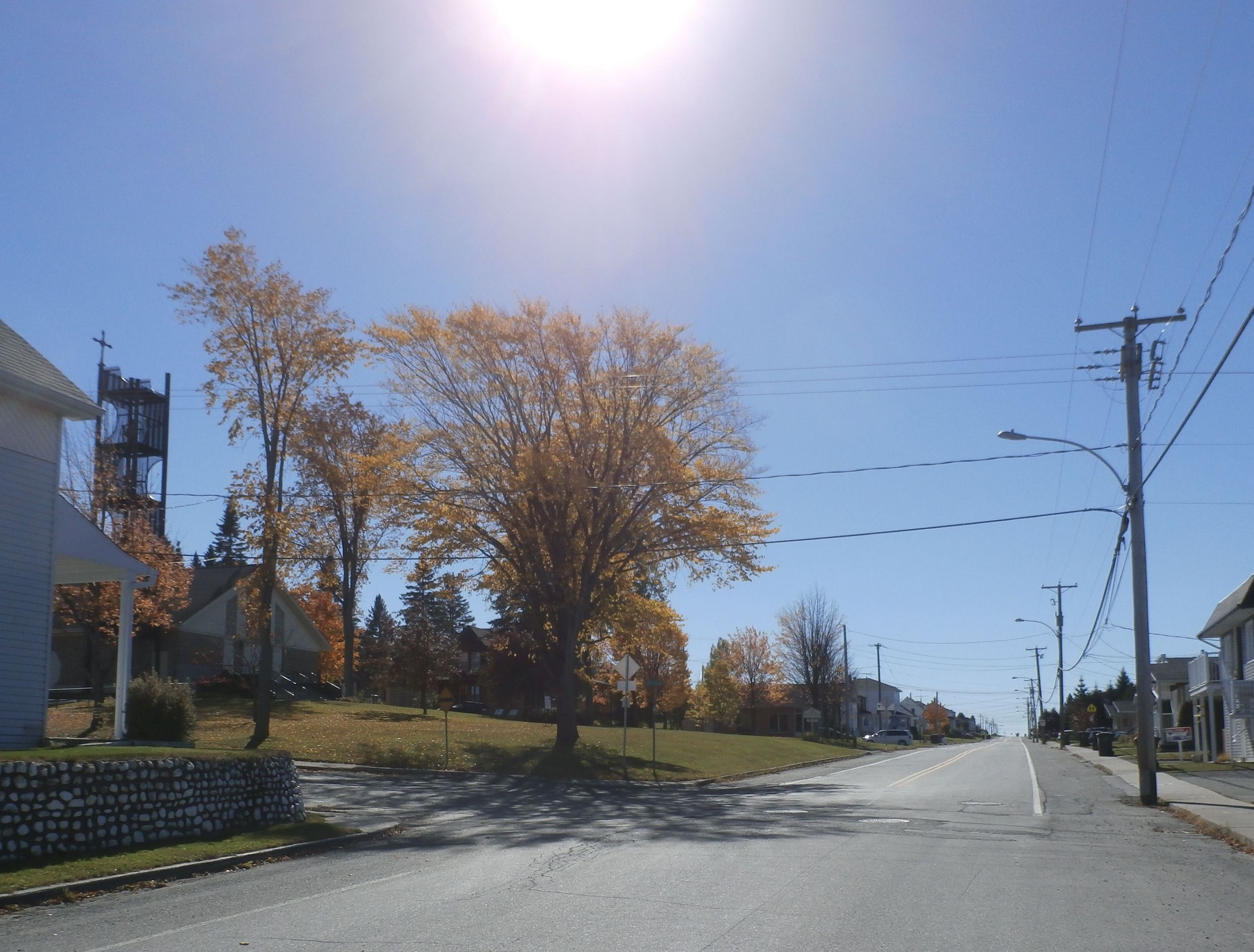

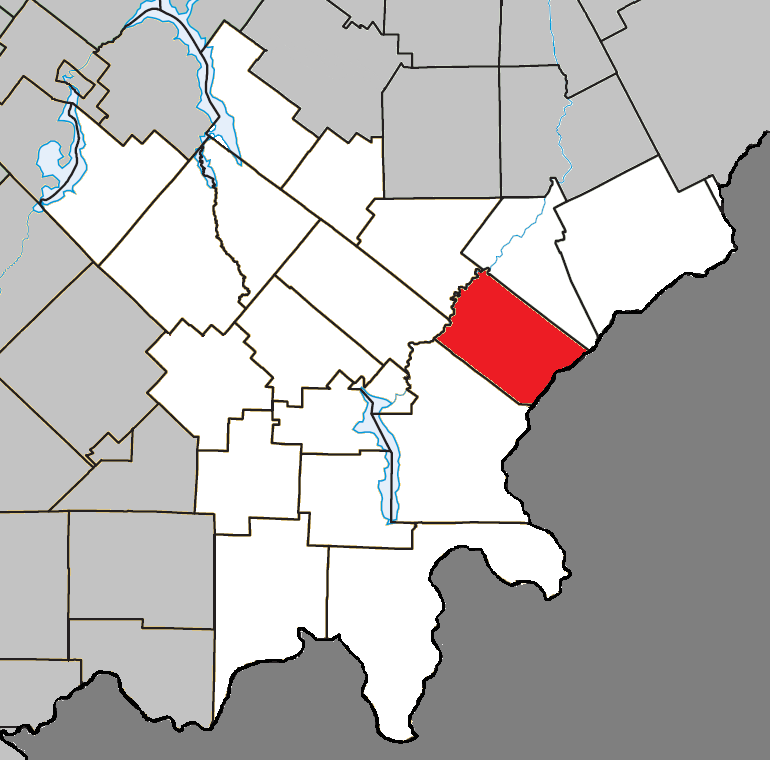
- Location within Le Granit RCM

- Location in southern Quebec
- Coordinates: 45°39′N 70°44′W
- Country: Canada
- Province: Quebec
- Region: Estrie
- RCM: Le Granit
- Constituted: November 26, 1903

Government
  - Mayor: Danièle Provencher
  - Federal riding: Mégantic—L'Érable—Lotbinière
  - Prov. riding: Mégantic

Area
  - Total: 134.00 km^{2} (51.74 sq mi)
  - Land: 134.95 km^{2} (52.10 sq mi)
- There is an apparent contradiction between two authoritative sources

Population (2021)
  - Total: 708
  - Density: 5.2/km^{2} (13/sq mi)
  - Pop 2016-2021: ▼3.5%
  - Dwellings: 317
- Time zone: UTC−5 (EST)
  - Summer (DST): UTC−4 (EDT)
- Postal code(s): G0Y 1A0
- Area code: 819
- Highways: R-204
- Website: www.munaudet.qc.ca

Audet (French pronunciation: [odɛ]) is a municipality in the Le Granit Regional County Municipality in the Estrie region of Quebec, Canada. Population is 708 as of the Canada 2021 Census.

Although the post office has been known as Audet since 1894, named after Michel Audet, the first postmaster, the municipality was known as Saint-Hubert-de-Spaulding until 1959, referring to the township of Spaulding, in which it is located.

Audet sits on a plateau at 535 metres (1,755 ft) in altitude in the Appalachians, making it one of the highest municipalities in Quebec.

== History ==
The municipality was originally part of Spaulding and Ditchfield. In 1903, Saint-Hubert-de-Spaulding split from Spaulding and Ditchfield to became a separate municipality. In 1959, Saint-Hubert-de-Spaulding changed its name to Audet.
