= Rivière aux Araignées =

River in Estrie, Quebec (Canada)

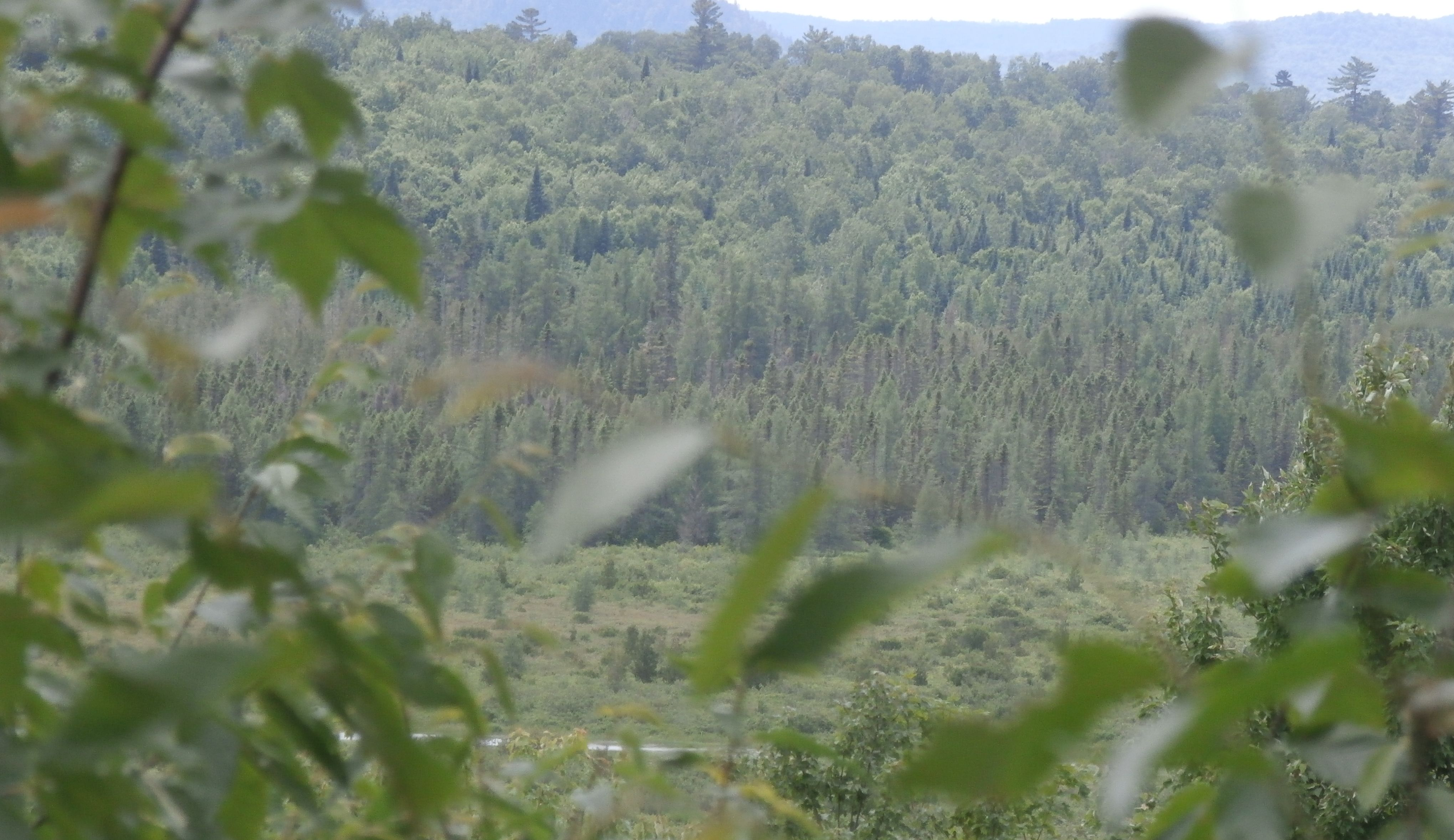
- The Araignées river is only accessible by water; you can see it in the middle of the marsh to the east of Lac aux Araignées.

- Location within Quebec

Location
- Country: Canada
- Province: Quebec
- Region: Estrie
- MRC: Le Granit Regional County Municipality

Physical characteristics
- Source: Mountain streams on the border of Quebec and Maine (United States)
  - location: Saint-Augustin-de-Woburn, (MRC) Le Granit Regional County Municipality, Québec
  - coordinates: 45.395419°N 70.694999°W
  - elevation: 450 metres (1,480 ft)
- Mouth: Lake Mégantic, Chaudière River
  - location: Frontenac
  - coordinates: 45.46639°N 70.788332°W
  - elevation: 391 metres (1,283 ft)
- Length: 26.6 kilometres (16.5 mi)
- Basin size: 437.9 kilometres (272.10 mi)

Basin features
- Progression: Lake Mégantic, Chaudière River, St. Lawrence River
- River system: St. Lawrence River
- Tributaries
  - left: (upstream) Arnold River, ruisseau Campagna
  - right: (upstream) rivière des Indiens (lac aux Araignées), ruisseau Meads, Branche Est, ruisseau des Cascades

The rivière aux Araignées (in English: Spider River) is a tributary on the south shore of Lake Mégantic whose outfall is the Chaudière River which flows northward to flow into the south shore of the St. Lawrence River.

The Araignées River flows in the municipalities of Saint-Augustin-de-Woburn and Frontenac, in the Le Granit Regional County Municipality (MRC), in the administrative region of Estrie, in Quebec in Canada.

== Geography ==
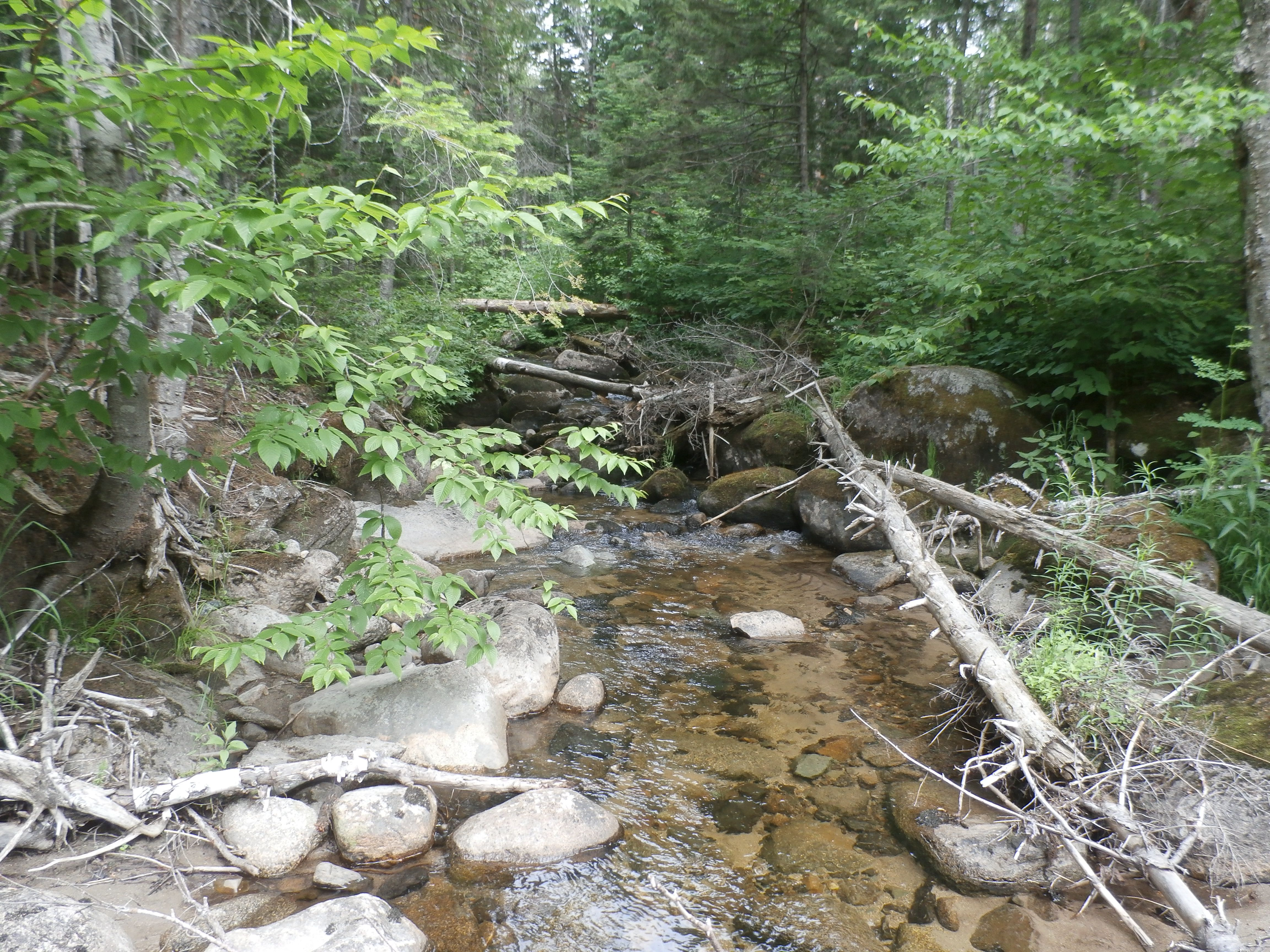
Rivière aux Araignées about 2.5 kilometres (1.6 mi) from its source.

The "rivière aux Araignées" originates near the summit of Mont Pisgah on the Canada–United States border, or 0.4 kilometres (0.25 mi) north of the Canadian-American border. The river is joined by several streams that drain the western flank of Mont Merrill, Caribou Mountain and several border mountains between Quebec and Maine (United States) which surround a valley which constitutes its watershed, drained by several branches of the Chutes brook, the Caribou brook and the Cascades brook. It flows between Mont Louise and Mont Flat Top before flowing onto the south-eastern shore of Lac aux Araignées.

Upper course of the river (segment of 21.2 kilometres (13.2 mi))

From its source, the "rivière aux Araignées" flows over:

- 3.9 kilometres (2.4 mi) north-west, up to the confluence of "Ruisseau des Cascades" (coming from the east);
- 0.6 kilometres (0.37 mi) towards the north-west, to the confluence of a stream (coming from the east);
- 5.2 kilometres (3.2 mi) north-west, up to a road bridge;
- 3.5 kilometres (2.2 mi) north-west, to the confluence of the Club brook;
- 3.1 kilometres (1.9 mi) west, to the southeast shore of lac aux Araignées;
- 4.9 kilometres (3.0 mi) towards the west, crossing lac aux Araignées, to the dam located at its mouth.

Lower course of the river (segment of 3.5 kilometres (2.2 mi))

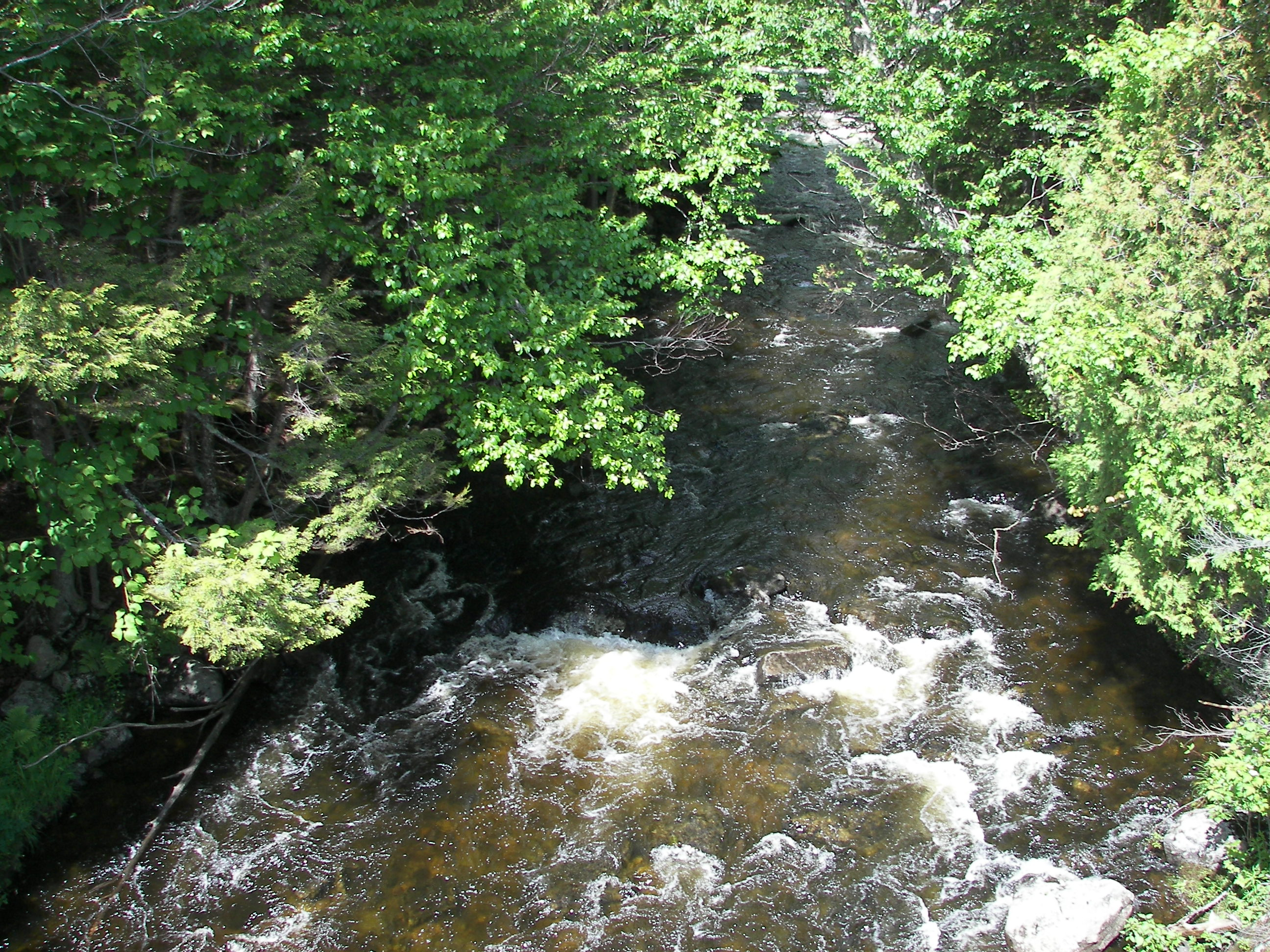
Discharge of the lac aux Araignées, between the lake and the road 161 bridge

From lac aux Araignées, the river takes the name of discharge of lac aux Araignées and flows to:

- 1.0 kilometre (0.62 mi) southward, to the north shore of a bay in Lac des Joncs (Mégantic);
- 2.5 kilometres (1.6 mi) south then north-west, to Lac des Joncs.

The rivière aux Araignées watershed, which is 437.9 kilometres (272.10 mi) and that of the Arnold River with 265 kilometres (164.66 mi) meet in the landfill lac des Joncs, before reaching lake Mégantic.

== Toponymy ==
The toponym "rivière aux Araignées" was made official on December 5, 1968, at the Commission de toponymie du Québec.

== See also ==
- List of rivers of Quebec
