= Mount Louise =

Mountain in Estrie, Quebec, Canada

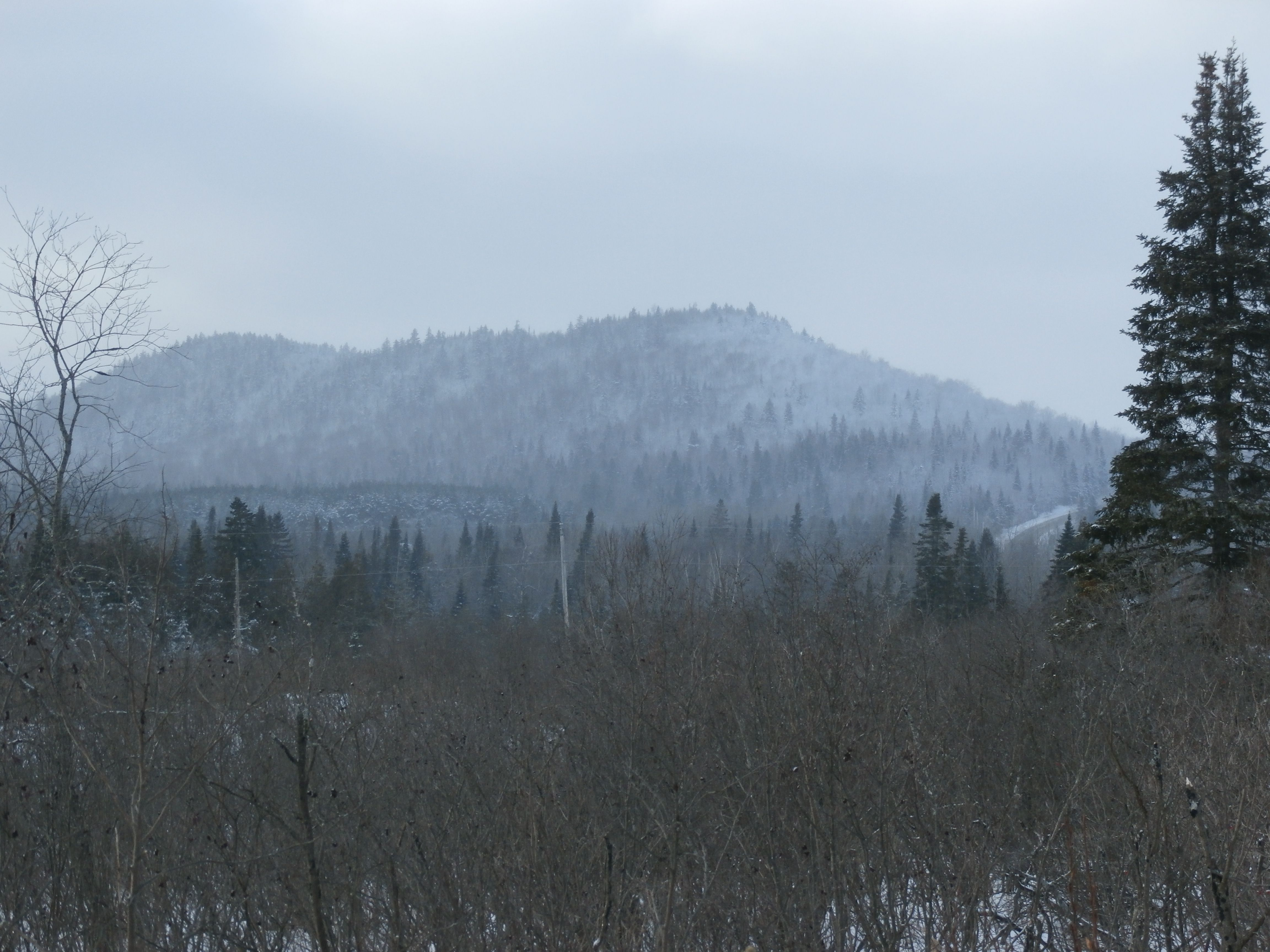
- Mont Louise near Saints-Martyrs-Canadiens.

Highest point
- Peak: 475 metres (1,558 ft)
- Parent peak: Notre Dame Mountains (Appalachian Mountains)
- Coordinates: 45°51′15″N 71°30′05″W

Geography
- Location: Estrie
- Country: Canada
- Province: Québec
- Region: Region

Mount Louise is part of the low plateaus of the Appalachian Mountains very close to the municipality of Saints-Martyrs-Canadiens; it is located in the Arthabaska Regional County Municipality, in the administrative region of Centre-du-Québec in Quebec, in Canada. It rises to 475 metres (1,558 ft) above sea level.

== Toponymy ==
The toponym "Mont Louise" was formalized on December 5, 1968 by the Commission de toponymie du Québec.
