= Zec Louise-Gosford =

- Location within Quebec
- Location: Canada; Québec; Le Granit Regional County Municipality
- Nearest city: Lac-Mégantic, Saint-Augustin-de-Woburn, Frontenac
- Coordinates: 45°26′N 70°42′W
- Area: 168.40 km^{2} (65.02 sq mi)
- Established: 1978
- Governing body: Association Louise-Gosford inc

The ZEC Louise-Gosford is a "zone d'exploitation contrôlée" (controlled harvesting zone) (ZEC), located in two municipalities: Saint-Augustin-de-Woburn for the south part of the zec and Frontenac for the north sector of the zec. The zec is located in Le Granit Regional County Municipality, in Eastern townships, in Quebec, in Canada.

The ZEC was established in 1978 by provincial legislation providing access to public lands in lieu of private clubs. The administration office of the ZEC was given to the "Association Louise-Gosford" which was established on April 3, 1978 and registered as a nonprofit legal entity on March 29, 1995 to the Registrar of companies in Quebec. The purpose of the ZEC is to exploit the territory including through tourist activities while overseeing the activities of hunting and fishing.

== Geography ==
The southern boundary of this hunting and fishing area of 171 km^{2} (66 sq mi) is backed by the Canada-US border. ZEC has two distinct sectors distanced by 6 km; these sectors are an appendix that stepped a dozen kilometers to the south in the Maine. Conversely, these two parts of the territory are separated by an appendix of Franklin County of Maine advancing toward North in the Quebec.

This protected area has no lake; however, the south-west part of the ZEC is bounded on the south by Arnold lake at the foot of the mountain "Le Plateau". The River Araignées pass through its north-east part of the territory, and empties into Lake Araignées which is outside of north-east part of the zec. The two sectors of the ZEC are largely bordered by the Canada-US border; they are surrounded by mountains and have many swamps. The southwestern part of the ZEC covers the south side of route 161 up to the border.

The main mountains of the ZEC are:

- North-east part: Flat Top mountain (737 m.), Merrill mountain (894 m.), Caribou mountain (1073 m), Bluets mountains (721 m) and Mount Pisgah (874 m.);
- South-west part: mountain Pepin (620 m.), Black Mountain (777 m.), Le Plateau, Mount of Bogue and Mount Gosford (1193 m.).

Note: In the six kilometers between the two parts of the ZEC, there are the following mountains: mountain Pepin (620 m.), Choquette mountain (609 m.) and Mount Louise (625 m.). In this sector, the Canada-United States border was mainly established based on the mountaintops in order to distribute the subwatershed between the two countries.

The Gosford entrance station, located at 1001 Rang 5, Saint-Augustin-de-Woburn, G0Y 1R0, is the main accès. While the Louise entrance station, located at 4240 4th, Frontenac, G6B 2S1, is the secondary access entrance.

== Fishing and hunting ==
The ZEC of a small-scale has brook trout, brown trout and brook trout in the "river des Araignés". The wildlife is abundant in this area, including moose.

== Toponymy ==
The name of the ZEC originates from the two mountains in the territory:

- The Mount Louise (750 m (2,460 ft)) is located between the two sectors of the ZEC. It straddles on the Canada-US border. This name evokes the memory of Princess Louise, daughter of Queen Victoria;
- The Mont Gosford (1,186 m (3,891 ft)) is located in the center of the southern part of the ZEC. This name reminds Archibald Acheson, 2nd Earl of Gosford, Governor in Chief of the British North America from 1835 to 1838.

== See also ==
- Frontenac, municipality for the northern sector of the zec
- Saint-Augustin-de-Woburn, municipality for the southern sector of the sec
- Le Granit Regional County Municipality (MRC)
- Estrie, administrative region of Quebec
- Zone d'exploitation contrôlée (controlled harvesting zone) (ZEC)
