= Frontenac, Quebec =

Frontenac
- Municipality
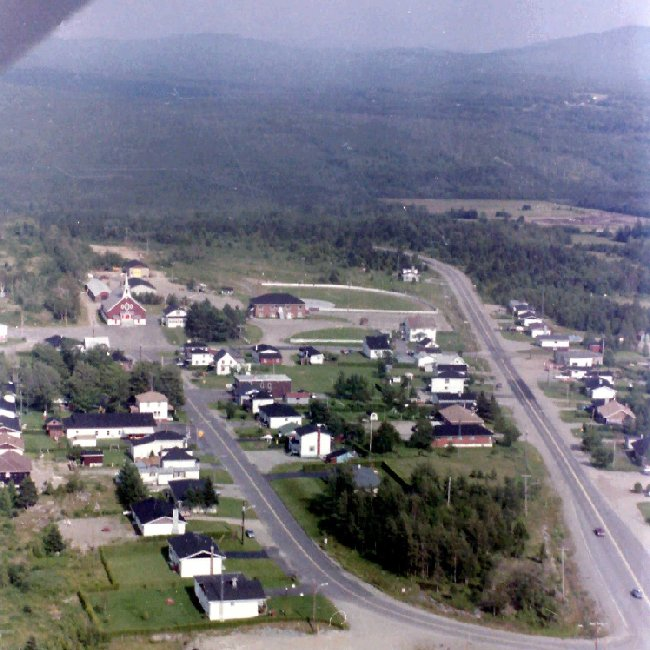
- Aerial view of Frontenac

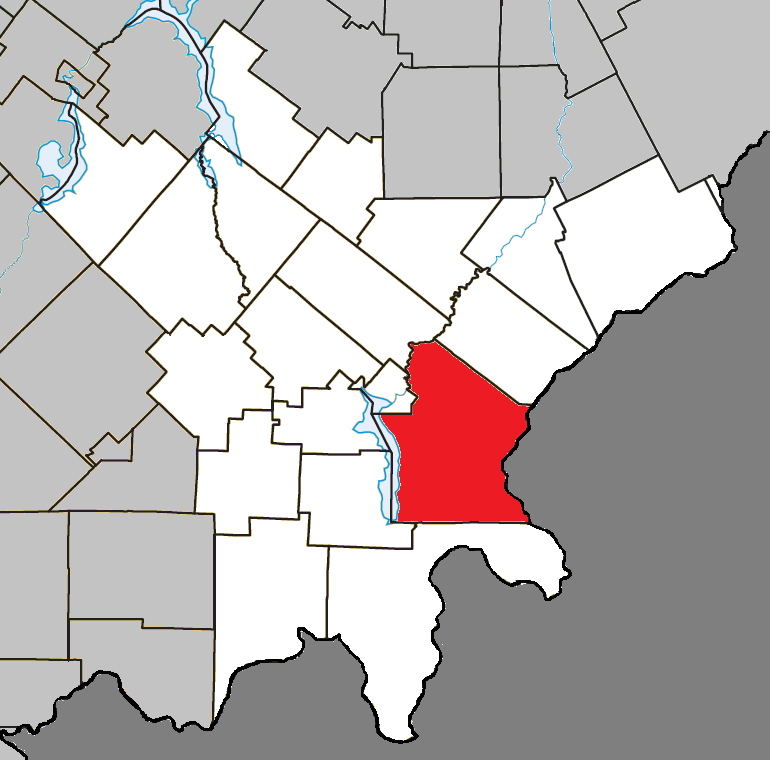
- Location within Le Granit RCM

- Location in southern Quebec
- Coordinates: 45°35′N 70°50′W
- Country: Canada
- Province: Quebec
- Region: Estrie
- RCM: Le Granit
- Constituted: January 1, 1882

Government
  - Mayor: Gaby Gendron
  - Federal riding: Mégantic—L'Érable—Lotbinière
  - Prov. riding: Mégantic

Area
  - Total: 244.60 km^{2} (94.44 sq mi)
  - Land: 223.60 km^{2} (86.33 sq mi)

Population (2021)
  - Total: 1,811
  - Density: 8.1/km^{2} (21/sq mi)
  - Pop 2016-2021: ▲4.4%
  - Dwellings: 922
- Time zone: UTC−5 (EST)
  - Summer (DST): UTC−4 (EDT)
- Postal code(s): G6B 2S1
- Area code: 819
- Highways: R-161; R-204
- Website: www.municipalitefrontenac.qc.ca

Frontenac (French pronunciation: [fʁɔ̃tnak]) is a municipality in Le Granit Regional County Municipality in Estrie, Quebec, Canada, on the Canada–United States border. Its population was 1,811 as of the Canada 2021 Census.

The area was settled heavily from 1870 to 1880 by colonists from the United Kingdom and the United States. As such, it was known until 1959 as the united counties of Spaulding and Ditchfield (cantons unis de Spaulding-et-Ditchfield). The municipality was renamed in honour of Louis de Buade de Frontenac, a governor general of New France who played a significant role in the development of the colony. Today's population is predominantly French-speaking.

== See also ==
- Zec Louise-Gosford
