= Louise Ayer Hatheway =

American philanthropist

- Born: 1876
- Died: 1955 (aged 78–79)

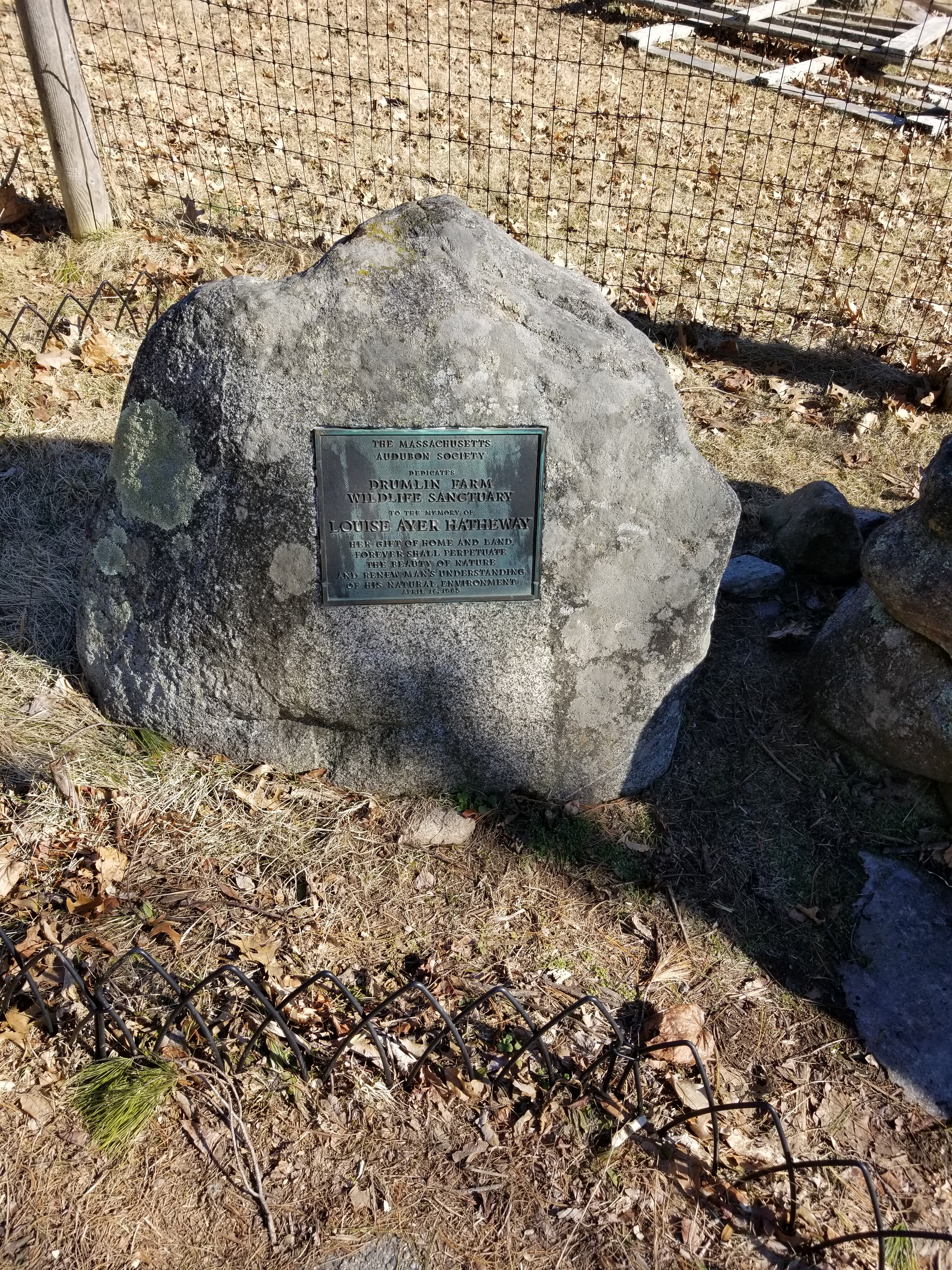
Rock monument with plaque honoring Drumlin founder Louise Ayer Hatheway

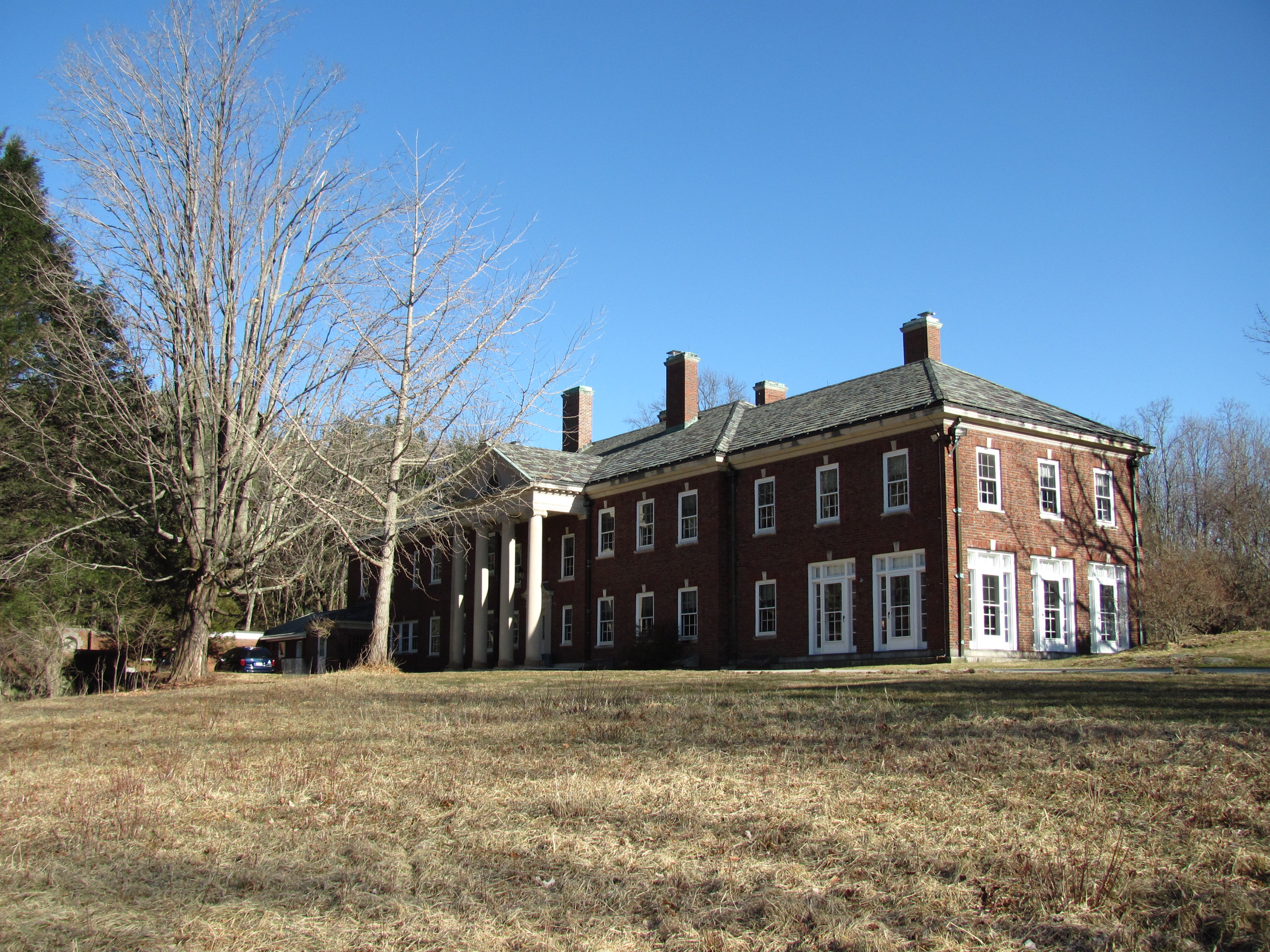
Gordon Hall across the road from Drumlin Farm

Louise Ayer Hatheway (1876-1955) was a philanthropist, heiress and "genteel farmer" who founded Drumlin Farm Wildlife Sanctuary in Lincoln, Massachusetts.

Louise Raynor Ayer was born in 1876 to Cornelia Wheaton and Frederick Ayer, a founder of the American Woolen Company. Her brother-in-law was General George S. Patton. In 1900 Louise Raynor Ayer married attorney Donald Gordon. The Gordons had two children; daughter Jean Gordon allegedly had an affair with General Patton and committed suicide shortly after Patton's death, and son Crawford "Crow" Gordon, father of current Governor of Wyoming Mark Gordon, died in 2014.

In 1915 Hatheway founded Drumlin Farm as a country retreat when she bought up several smaller farms and constructed a tunnel under Route 117 to connect her house, Gordon Hall, with the farmlands. Donald Gordon died in 1923.

In 1925 Louise Gordon then married Conrad Perkins Hatheway, and he died in 1937. Louise Hatheway died in 1955 and was buried in Mount Auburn Cemetery in Cambridge, Massachusetts.

Hatheway bequeathed her estate to the Massachusetts Audubon Society which became the Drumlin Farm Wildlife Sanctuary in 1956. Gordon Hall currently serves as the Massachusetts Audubon Society Headquarters.
