= Jean Gordon (Red Cross) =

American socialite, WWII Red Cross worker (1915–1946)

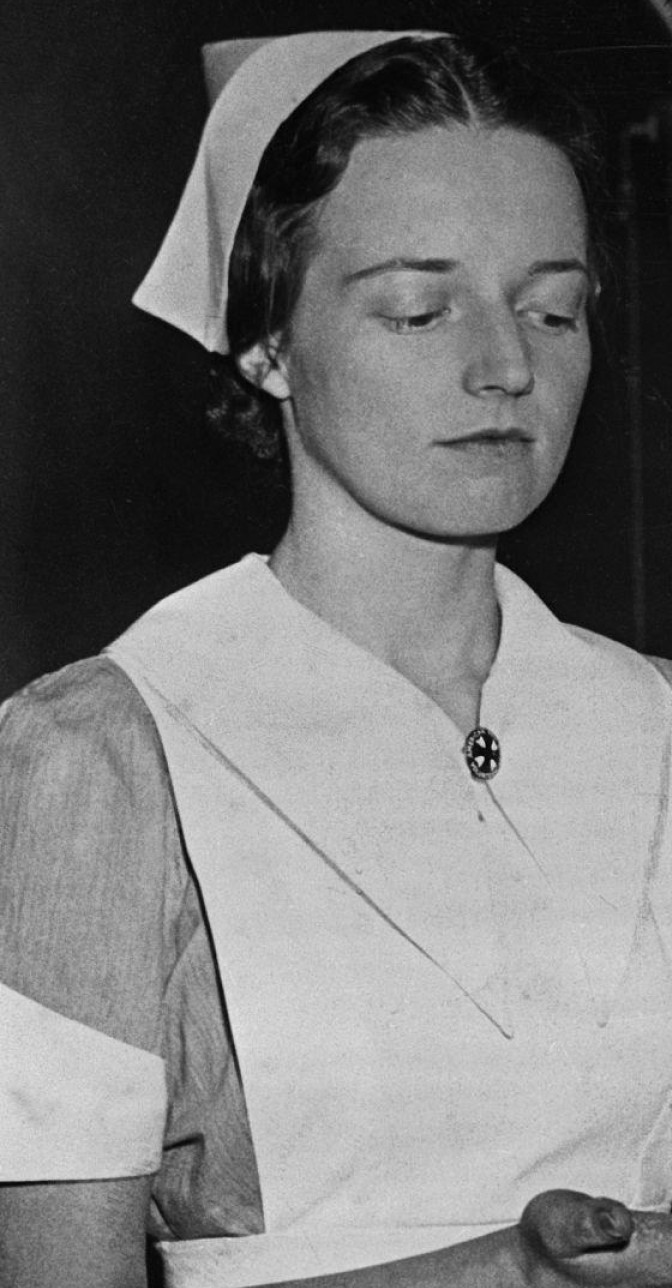
- Gordon c. 1945
- Born: February 4, 1915; Boston, Massachusetts, U.S.
- Died: January 8, 1946 (aged 30); New York, New York, U.S.
- Occupation: American Red Cross Clubmobile Staff Assistant ("donut girl")

Jean Gordon (February 4, 1915 – January 8, 1946) was an American socialite and a Red Cross worker during World War II. A niece by marriage of General George S. Patton, some writers claim she had a long affair with Patton, allegedly beginning years before the war and continuing behind the front lines of wartime Europe. The published memoirs of Gordon's good friend, Patton's daughter Ruth Ellen, who also collaborated on her nephew Robert's work on the Pattons, as well as correspondence from Patton's wife, Beatrice, reveals that the family considered Gordon and Patton to have been in a romantic relationship. Patton's scholarly biographers disagree. After her lover (a junior officer) returned to his wife, and shortly after Patton died, she committed suicide.

== Early life ==
Jean Gordon's mother, Louise Raynor Ayer, daughter of the textile industrialist Frederick Ayer and his first wife Cornelia Wheaton, was a half-sister of Patton's wife Beatrice. Her father Donald Gordon, a well-known Boston lawyer, died of leukemia when Jean was 8 years old. Gordon, described as "a quiet but witty girl, highly intelligent and beautiful," and "a vivacious and lovely brunette," was prominent in prewar Boston high society, being a member of women's organizations such as the Junior League and the Vincent Club. The same age as Patton's younger daughter Ruth Ellen and her best friend, she spent many of her vacations with the Pattons and was a bridesmaid in the weddings of both Patton girls.

According to writer Nancy J. Morris, Gordon's long romantic involvement with General Patton began during one such vacation in the 1930s. Patton was posted in Hawaii, and Gordon visited the family there. Morris writes: "When Beatrice's niece, Jean Gordon, visited, Patton began a flirtation with the girl. Gordon was a recent Boston debutante, pretty, lively, and the best friend of Ruth Ellen, the Pattons' daughter. Unwisely, Beatrice did not accompany Patton and Jean on a horse-buying trip to a neighbor island, and when the two returned, it was clear to Beatrice that the flirtation had become an affair."

Morris quotes Ruth Ellen Patton's memories of her mother's reaction via biographer Carlo D'Este's research into Ruth Ellen's personal papers. By this telling, Beatrice told her daughter "Your father needs me. He doesn't know it right now, but he needs me. In fact, right now, he needs me more than I need him.... I want you to remember this; that even the best and truest of men can be bedazzled and make fools of themselves. So, if your husband ever does this to you, you can remember that I didn't leave your father. I stuck with him because I am all he really has, and I love him, and he loves me."

== World War II ==
After completing the Red Cross nurse's aide training course early in the war, Jean Gordon volunteered in several Boston hospitals, serving for a while as vice-chairman of the Boston Red Cross Volunteer Nurse's Aide Corps, before being sent to England in May 1944 as a Red Cross staff assistant. She contacted Patton early in July, and he visited her in London shortly before departing for Normandy. He later told General Everett Hughes, his close friend serving on Eisenhower's staff, that he wanted to keep her presence a secret. When Hughes wondered about their relationship, Patton, "more boastful than repentant," told him that Jean had "been mine for 12 years." If this is accurate, it would suggest that they had been involved from the time Gordon was 17 years old, which would pre-date the episode in Hawai'i. Gordon was assigned to the ARC Clubmobile group L attached to the Third Army headquarters as a "donut girl", a volunteer who served donuts, coffee, and cigarettes to front-line troops, as well as diverting them with music, dance, and chat. She became Patton’s constant companion (Note: "I was invited to a conference in Austria... It was a critique, and we sat with a whole bunch of colonels and generals... It was after the war in Europe was over, but we were still fighting in Japan... Afterward, we had a social. Patton’s niece... attended the cocktail party, and a young major took a fancy to her. Then it came time that the general wanted to leave. Well, when the aide tells you that the general is leaving and he’s got his niece with him, you let the niece leave. But this major kept talking, and Patton had to wait... The next day he was transferred to the Pacific.") (Note: "Patton's favorite pet was his niece... a Red Cross girl. She was often in the general's company in rear echelon areas, but more often dished out doughnuts and java, inches from the front line.") and his hostess when he entertained guests at his headquarters. (Note: "[Patton] canceled his plans, and that night... threw a late-night party, where the hostess, Patton's 'niece' Jean Gordon, plied staff and generals with bourbon until they all got roaring drunk. 'Everybody was pretty high when I got there,' a confused [Lt. Gen. Manton] Eddy wrote in his diary. 'Frankly, I didn't know what was going on.'") The two of them would converse animatedly with each other in fluent French, to the confusion of those around them. (This custom of speaking in French in public settings was something that Patton also practiced with his wife, Beatrice.) Patton made a practice of inviting the Red Cross girls to dine with his staff, especially when dignitaries, such as General Eisenhower, visited his headquarters, and they also had Patton to dinner several times. Once the war was over, the girls became even more a part of his entourage.

=== Postwar ===
According to Everett Hughes, Patton had quarreled with Jean Gordon not long before Hughes visited his headquarters early in May 1945; perhaps, he thought, about what would become of her now. Soon, however, they had made up, and apparently renewed their liaison during Patton's leave in England a while later. In June, Patton returned to the United States for a month-long bond drive. After seeing him off, Hughes took the distraught Jean back to his apartment so she could "have a good cry."

== Dispute over the relationship with Patton ==
Beatrice Patton clearly believed that Jean Gordon was intimately involved with her husband and wrote to him repeatedly to express her concerns, prompting his cavalier dismissals and a dishonest denial that he had even seen her. The evening before he left for his bond-raising tour, during a farewell dinner at the Ritz, Patton confessed to Everett Hughes that he was "scared to death of going back home to America;" and upon his return told Hughes: "Beatrice gave me hell. I'm glad to be in Europe!"

During her lifetime Ruth Ellen Patton publicly denied the rumors of an affair between her father and Gordon. (Note: "'The truth about Jean was that she fell in love overseas with a married officer... [Daddy] kept a watchful eye on Jean, as he would on any member of his family. But to say or imply that Daddy had been sleeping with Jean Gordon for 12 years and that she joined him to continue the affair - that's hogwash.'") Yet her posthumously published memoirs, as well as her nephew Robert's work on the Pattons she collaborated on, reveal that the family considered Gordon and Patton to have been in a romantic relationship; Ruth Ellen herself suspected that the romance had begun as early as 1934, which makes her father's assertion of a 12-year affair more credible. (Note: Ruth Ellen was certain her father had an affair with Gordon in 1936 when she stopped in Hawaii to visit the Pattons on her way to tour the Far East, but suspected that it had started earlier. "Looking back on it all, I can see that [Jean] had started making a play for Georgie as far back as Bee's wedding (in June 1934). But at that time it was highly unlikely that I could have thought that my best friend, exactly my age, could ever see anything in my father, an old, old man - nearly into his fifties! There was gradually no doubt in our minds that she was after just one thing... [Georgie] made a damned fool of himself. I was stunned... I [got] her dates with all my beaux... but none of them dated her more than once. I finally asked a beau ... why this should be, and he said... because she acted as if she wasn't a bit interested." Patton's grandson Robert wrote that, "after Georgie and Jean returned from their trip [to buy horses for the army on the Big Island of Hawaii], neither Beatrice nor Ruth Ellen doubted they'd become intimate." (Patton, 2004, p. 271) According to D'Este (p. 806-7), after she learned of the relationship between her father and cousin in Europe, Ruth Ellen referred to Jean in her unpublished memoir My Father as I Knew Him as "the Faithless Friend.") (Note: "Stories circulated through the family after Jean's death that she left a suicide note declaring: 'I will be with Uncle Georgie in heaven and have him all to myself before Beatrice arrives.'") (Note: Helen Patton, one of the General's grandchildren, confirmed such a stance: "'My grandfather was very sexual... [His affair with Jean Gordon] caused my grandmother an awful lot of pain. She played the stiff-upper-lipped wife, while Jean had the means and flexibility to become a nurse and accompany my grandfather.' A few years ago Patton met a French soldier who knew Gordon, and who confirmed the love and devotion she felt for her grandfather. 'Love was important to my grandfather’s ability to do his work. My grandmother’s love also held him up, and he was devoted to her. These were two women who loved him in completely different ways, and that’s OK.'")

Jean Gordon's supervisor, Betty South, the captain of the ARC Clubmobile crew attached to the Third Army headquarters, claimed that although Gordon adored General Patton, it was strictly in a father–daughter relationship, while the man she truly loved was a young married captain who left her despondent when he went home to his wife. (Note: "'Jean tried to drive the memory of him out of her mind, but she couldn't. She grew steadily more depressed and morose... [She] was a sensitive, responsive, high-strung young woman. The two men in her life who meant the most to her were gone. There seemed nothing or no one to live for. She borrowed a friend's apartment... turned on the gas, and turned off her life.'") However, her version is colored by the fact that she was protective of both Patton's and Gordon's reputation.

Patton's biographers have generally been more skeptical about the romantic link between Gordon and George Patton. Stanley Hirshson states that the relationship was casual. Dennis Showalter believes that Patton, under severe physical and psychological stress, made up claims of sexual conquest to prove his virility. Carlo D'Este agrees that Patton's "behavior suggests that in both 1936 [in Hawaii] and 1944–45, the presence of the young and attractive Jean was a means of assuaging the anxieties of a middle-aged man troubled over his virility and a fear of aging."

According to the noted film and military historian Lawrence Suid, the family's fear that a movie might portray the extramarital affair was a major contributing factor to their ongoing opposition to any production.

David Irving used General Hughes' wartime diary, which contains multiple references to Patton's intimate relationship with Gordon, to write about the affair in his 1981 book The War between the Generals. It had been available in the Library of Congress since 1958, but was not studied due to Hughes' illegible handwriting. However, since in 1980 Irving hired the handwriting expert Molly McClellan to decipher it and transcribe its 900 pages, most historians have used the diary as a source, while refraining from giving a definite verdict on the nature of the relationship.

== Death ==
Jean Gordon returned to the United States in December 1945 on the M.S. Gripsholm.

That same month, George Patton was critically injured in a car accident in Germany. He died in a hospital on December 21, 1945.

According to military historian Martin Blumenson, who later edited Patton's papers at the invitation of the family, Betty South "telephoned Jean to express her sorrow... Jean said, 'I think it is better this way for Uncle Georgie. There is no place for him any more, and he would have been unhappy with nothing to do.'... Whatever she had been to Patton before the war, during the conflict, and afterward, she helped to sustain and support him. Immediately after the war was over, when he... had no place to go in the army, he needed all the help he could get."

According to Carlo D'Este, shortly after Patton's death his wife Beatrice arranged to meet Gordon at a Boston hotel where she furiously confronted her over the supposed affair. (Note: "[She] asked her brother, Fred, to arrange for a room at a Boston hotel, where she would like to meet with Jean Gordon... Beatrice, the last to arrive, entered the room quietly... [She] suddenly pointed her finger at Jean and recited [a Hawaiian curse she had learned in the 1930s, and which she had quoted frequently in her own novels:]... 'May the Great Worm gnaw your vitals and may your bones rot joint by little joint.' ...Jean's face suddenly turned 'from rose to pearl to gray.' The cold, hostile expression on Beatrice's face so appalled her brother that he fled from the room. 'Fred said that there was so much malevolence in the room that he jumped up and grabbed his hat and ran out, and only slowed down when he reached the street.'")

D'Este writes: "Beatrice's jealousy of Jean Gordon was that of an older woman for a young and attractive mistress who has stolen her husband's interest... Jean told a friend that... with the war now over, perhaps Patton's death had been a blessing in disguise. [Robert Patton writes that she] 'had an understanding of him that was insightful and not frivolous, ample reason for his wife to deem her a serious rival. Beatrice, out of love, could forgive Georgie's indiscretion, but Jean she was determined to punish.'"

In the early morning hours of January 8, 1946 — only days after this confrontation with Beatrice and a little more than two weeks after Patton's death — Jean Gordon committed suicide, surrounded by General Patton's pictures, in the Upper East Side Manhattan apartment of a friend. She was found asphyxiated, with the four gas jets of the kitchen stove open and hissing gas. (Note: "Police listed the death as suicide, but the woman left no notes to explain her action. She lay on the floor in a negligee. Pictures of General Patton were strewn about her. There were four jets open on a small gas range nearby." The Boston Globe reported that "Miss Gordon was found at 1:45 A.M. seated in a dressing gown on a chair... while gas hissed from four open jets of the kitchen range." Some newspapers, such as the British Daily Mirror ("Patton's Niece Kills Herself"; Daily Mirror, Wed 9 Jan 1946, Page 8), in accordance with Associated Press simply noted that Jean Gordon had been grief-stricken since her uncle's death, while others, such as The Boston Globe and Chicago Tribune ("Found Dead"; Chicago Tribune, Wed 9 Jan 1946, Page 3), attributed her death to war nerves.)

== Bibliography ==
Footnotes

Notes

References

- Blumenson, Martin (1996) [1974]. The Patton Papers: 1940–1945. Da Capo Press. ISBN 978-0-306807176.- Total pages: 889
- D'Este, Carlo D'Este (1996) [1995]. Patton: A Genius for War. Harper Perennial. ISBN 978-0060927622. - Total pages: 977
- Irving, David John Cawdell (2010) [1981]. The War between the Generals. Focal Point Publications. ISBN 978-1-872197-28-9.
- Patton Totten, Ruth Ellen (2011) [2005]. The Button Box: A Daughter's Loving Memoir of Mrs. George S. Patton. University of Missouri Press. ISBN 978-0826219336. - Total pages: 400
- Patton, Robert H. (2004) [1994]. The Pattons: A Personal History of an American Family. Potomac Books Inc. ISBN 978-1574886900. - Total pages: 352
- Suid, Lawrence H. (2002). Guts and Glory - the Making of the American Military Image in Film. University Press of Kentucky. ISBN 978-0813190181.- Total pages: 748
- Jordan, Jonathan W. (2012) [2011]. Brothers, Rivals, Victors: Eisenhower, Patton, Bradley and the Partnership that Drove the Allied Conquest in Europe. NAL. ISBN 978-0451235831. - Total pages: 672
- Axelrod, Alan (2006). Patton: A Biography (Great Generals). Palgrave Macmillan Trade. ISBN 978-1403971395.- Total pages: 224
- Elson, Aaron (2002) [1994]. Tanks for the Memories. Chi Chi Press. ISBN 978-0964061187. – Total pages: 357
- Blumenson, Martin (1985). Patton: The Man Behind the Legend, 1885–1945. William Morrow Paperbacks. ISBN 978-0688137953. - Total pages: 320
- Lande, D. A. (2002). I Was with Patton: First-Person Accounts of WWII in George S. Patton's Command. Zenith Press. ISBN 978-0760310717. - Total pages: 304
- Steward, Scott C. (1993). The Sarsaparilla Kings: A Biography of Dr. James Cook Ayer and Frederick Ayer with a Record of Their Family. ASIN B000WT69FE. - Total pages: 177
- Korson, George (1945). At His Side: The Story of the American Red Cross Overseas in World War II. Coward-McCann. ASIN B000NZOPSA. - Total pages: 322
- "Gen. Patton's Niece Ends Life Surrounded by His Pictures". The Washington Post. January 9, 1946. p. 8.
- "Miss Gordon's Suicide Laid to 'War Nerves'; Niece of General Patton". The Boston Globe. January 9, 1946. p. 9.
- "Jean Gordon, Gen. Patton's Niece, Suicide". Boston Herald. January 9, 1946. p. 10.
- "Patton's Niece Victim of Gas in New York". Boston Traveler. January 8, 1946. pp. 1, 26.
- "General Patton and His Niece". Parade. April 19, 1981. p. 10.
- "The Price of Being a Patton: Wrestling with the Legacy of America's Most Famous General". The Daily Beast. May 26, 2014.
- "Volunteer Nurse's Aide Corps". Boston Herald. September 10, 1941. p. 3.
- "Society". Boston Traveler. October 14, 1942. p. 23.
- "Deaths Gordon". Boston Herald. October 9, 1923. p. 3.
- Cooney, Charles F.; Heiss, Harry G. (2002). "Everett Strait Hughes Papers – A Finding Aid to the Collection in the Library of Congress" (PDF).
