= Drumlin Farm =

Farm and wildlife sanctuary in Massachusetts, US

Drumlin Farm Wildlife Sanctuary
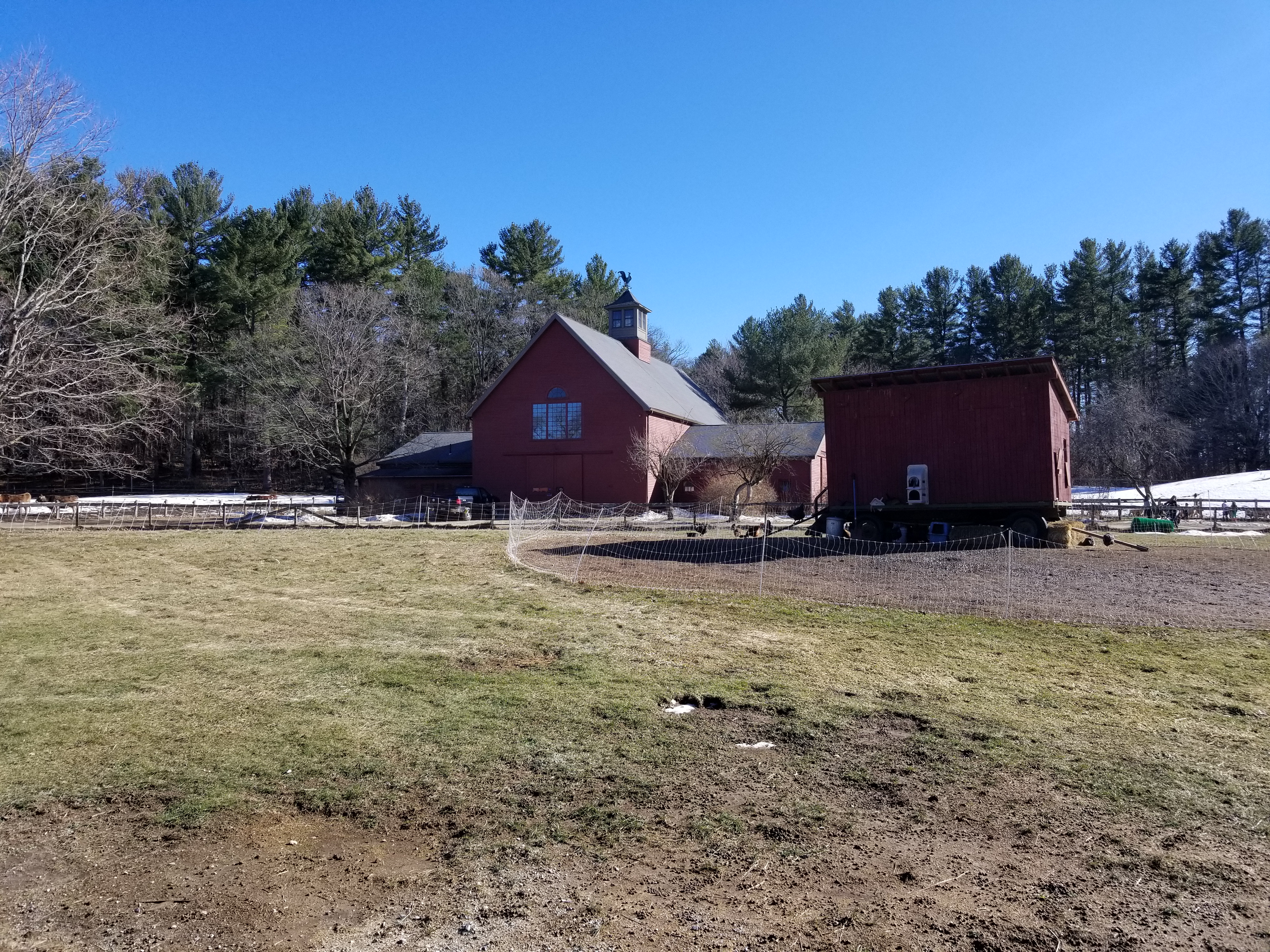
- Red Barn at Drumlin Farm
- Interactive map of Drumlin Farm Wildlife Sanctuary
- Type: farm, wildlife sanctuary, nature center
- Location: 208 South Great Road; Lincoln, Massachusetts, U.S.
- Coordinates: 42°24′29″N 71°19′47″W
- Area: 291 acres (118 ha)
- Created: 1956
- Operator: Massachusetts Audubon Society
- Hiking trails: 4 miles
- Website: Drumlin Farm Wildlife Sanctuary

Drumlin Farm is a 291-acre farm and wildlife sanctuary which is also the site of the headquarters of the Massachusetts Audubon Society. It is located at 208 South Great Road (Route 117) in Lincoln, Massachusetts.

Drumlin Farm is a working farm with animals and sustainably grown crops. The sanctuary has trails through "field, forest, and wetland habitat." The sanctuary was founded in 1956 when Louise Ayer Hatheway of Lowell bequeathed her estate to the Massachusetts Audubon Society. Hatheway had founded the farm years earlier as a country retreat when she bought up several smaller farms and constructed a tunnel under Route 117 to connect her house, Gordon Hall, with the farmlands. Gordon Hall currently serves as the Massachusetts Audubon Society Headquarters. The farm offers educational programs for children and adults, as well as a summer camp and an annual sheep-shearing festival.

== Farm ==
The farmyard and its buildings, which are open to visitors, house chickens, sheep, goats, pigs, cows, horses, and other animals. Meat and produce from the farm are sold at a farm stand on the property as well as through a Community Supported Agriculture program.

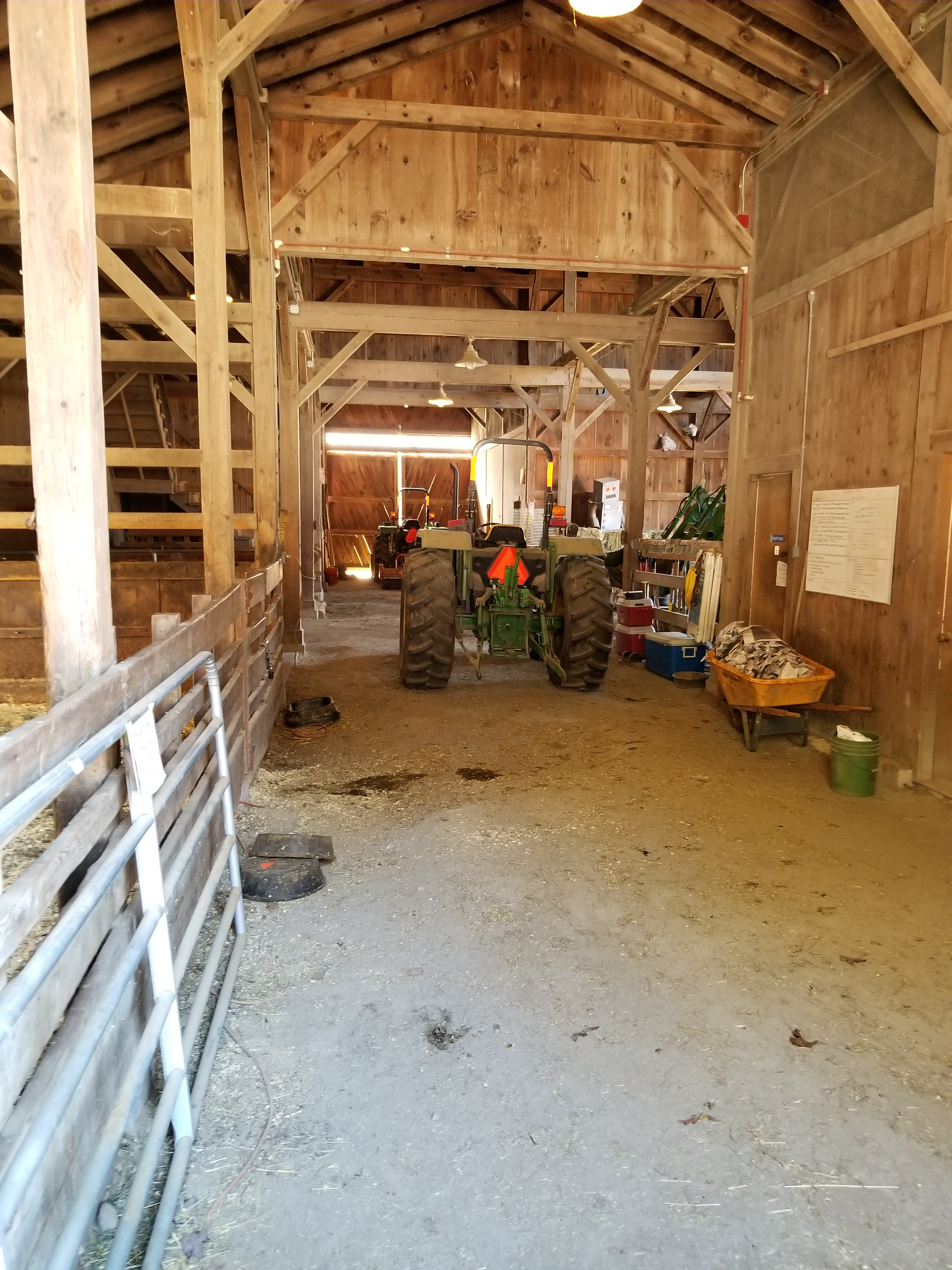
Interior of cow barn

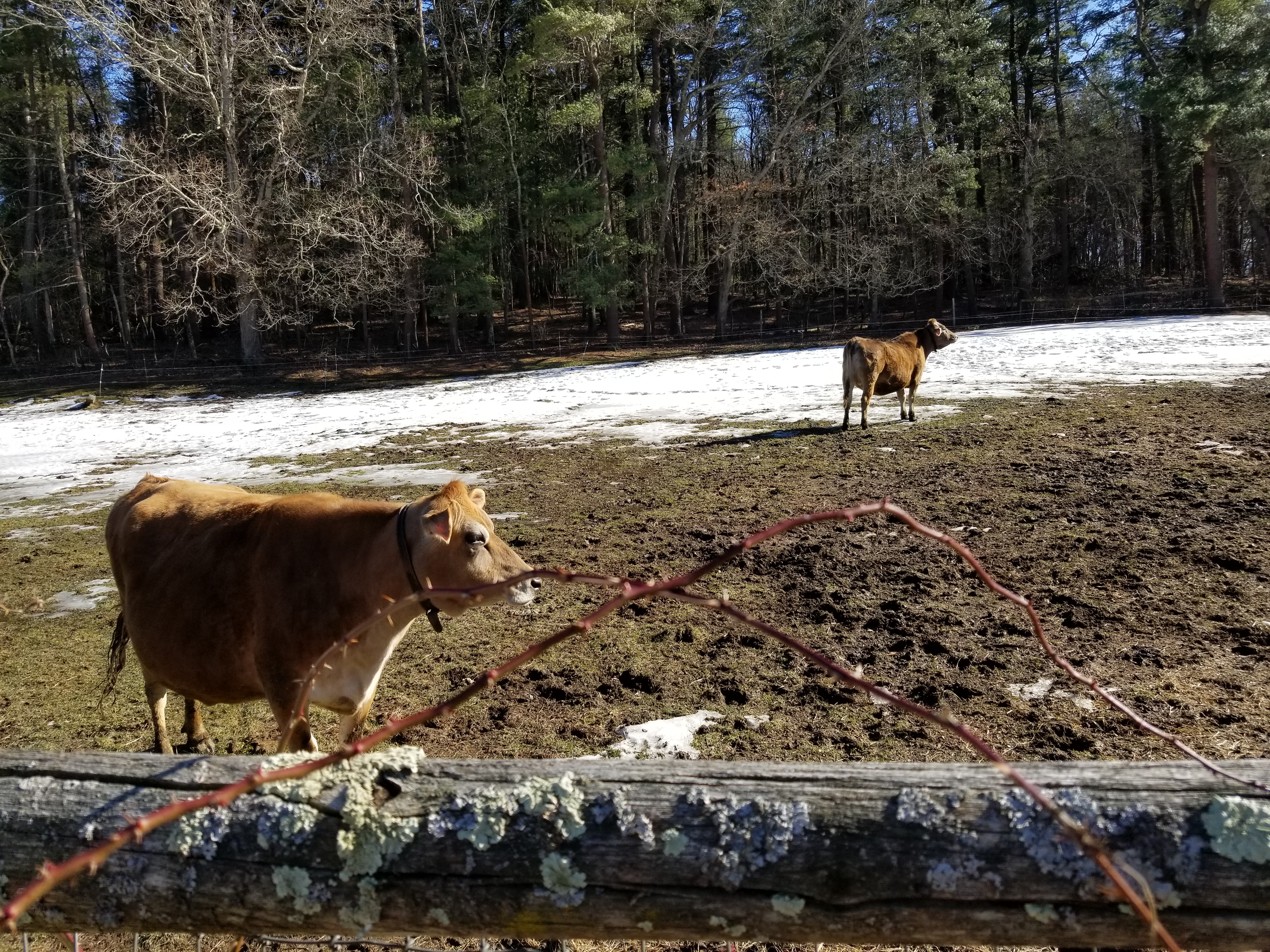
Cows grazing

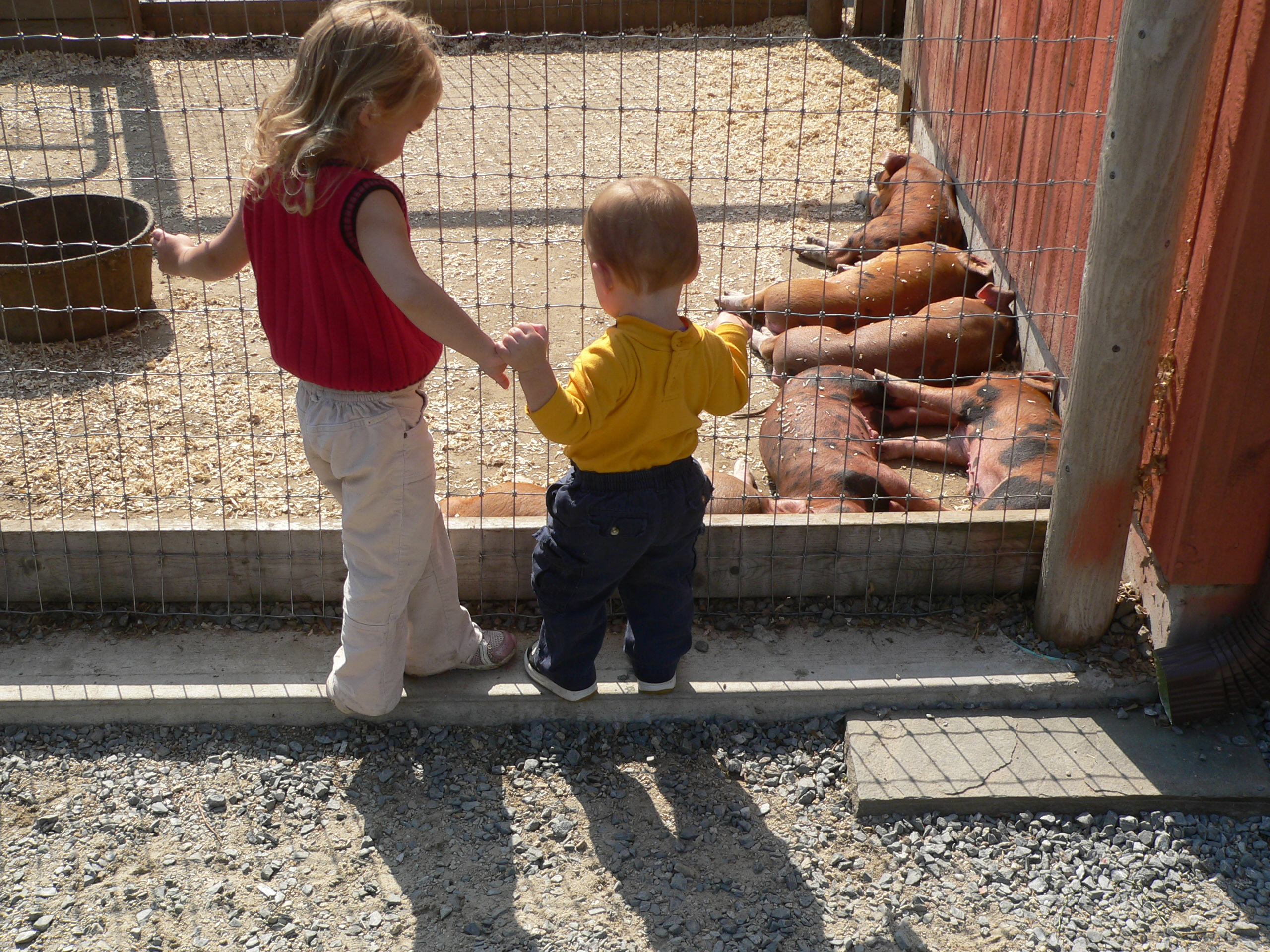
Visitors and piglets

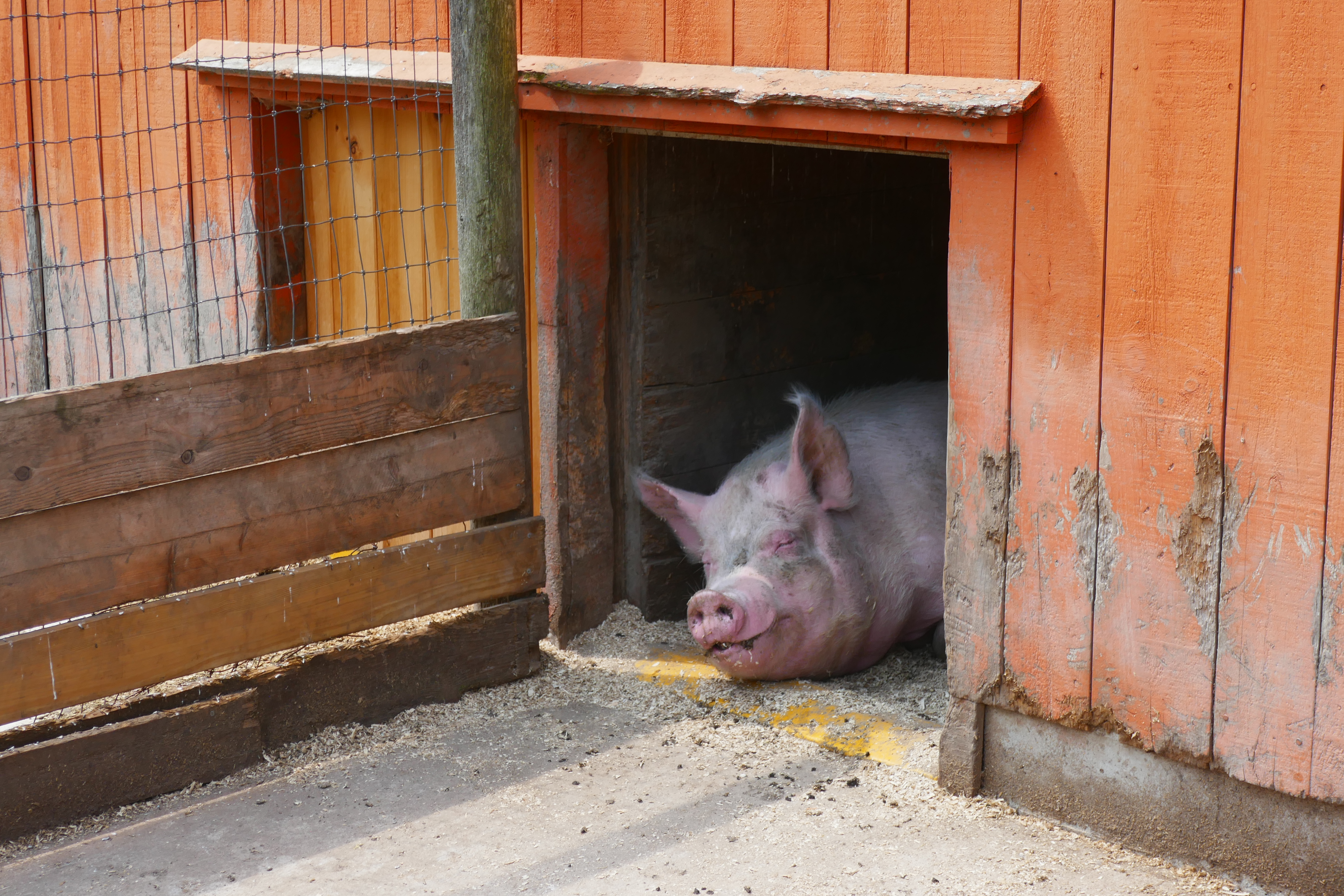
Pig at the Pig Barn

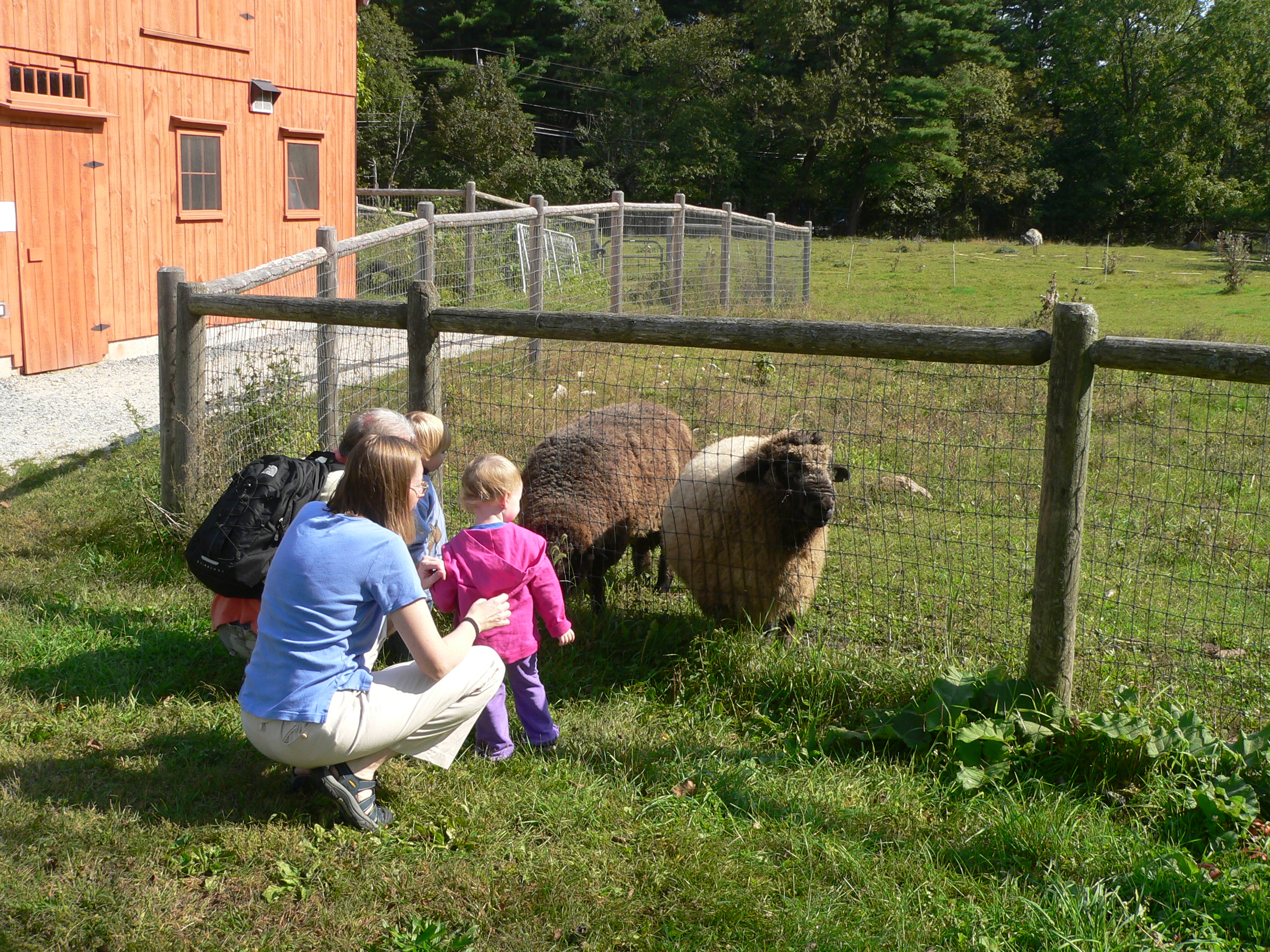
Visitors and sheep

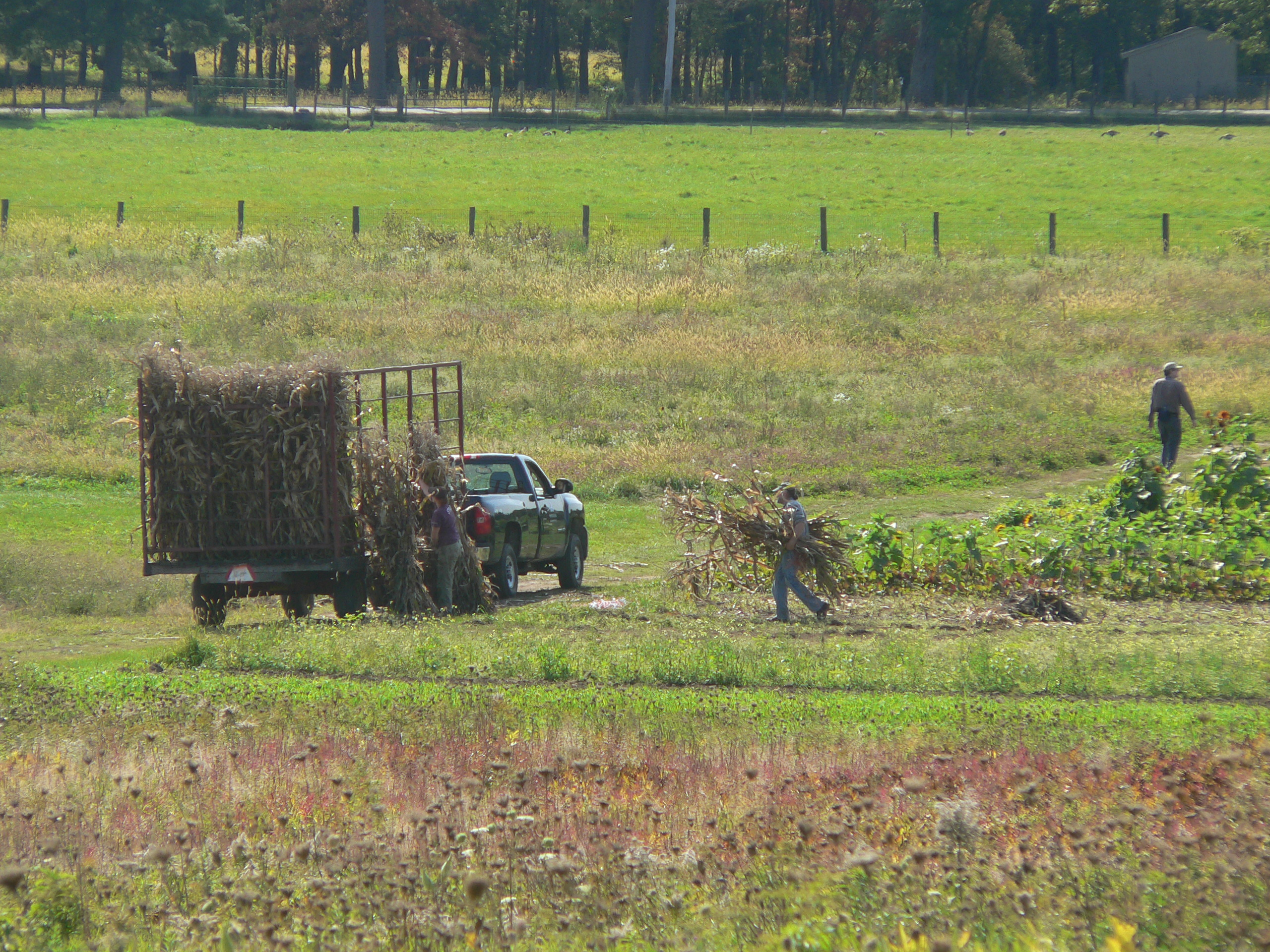
Harvest

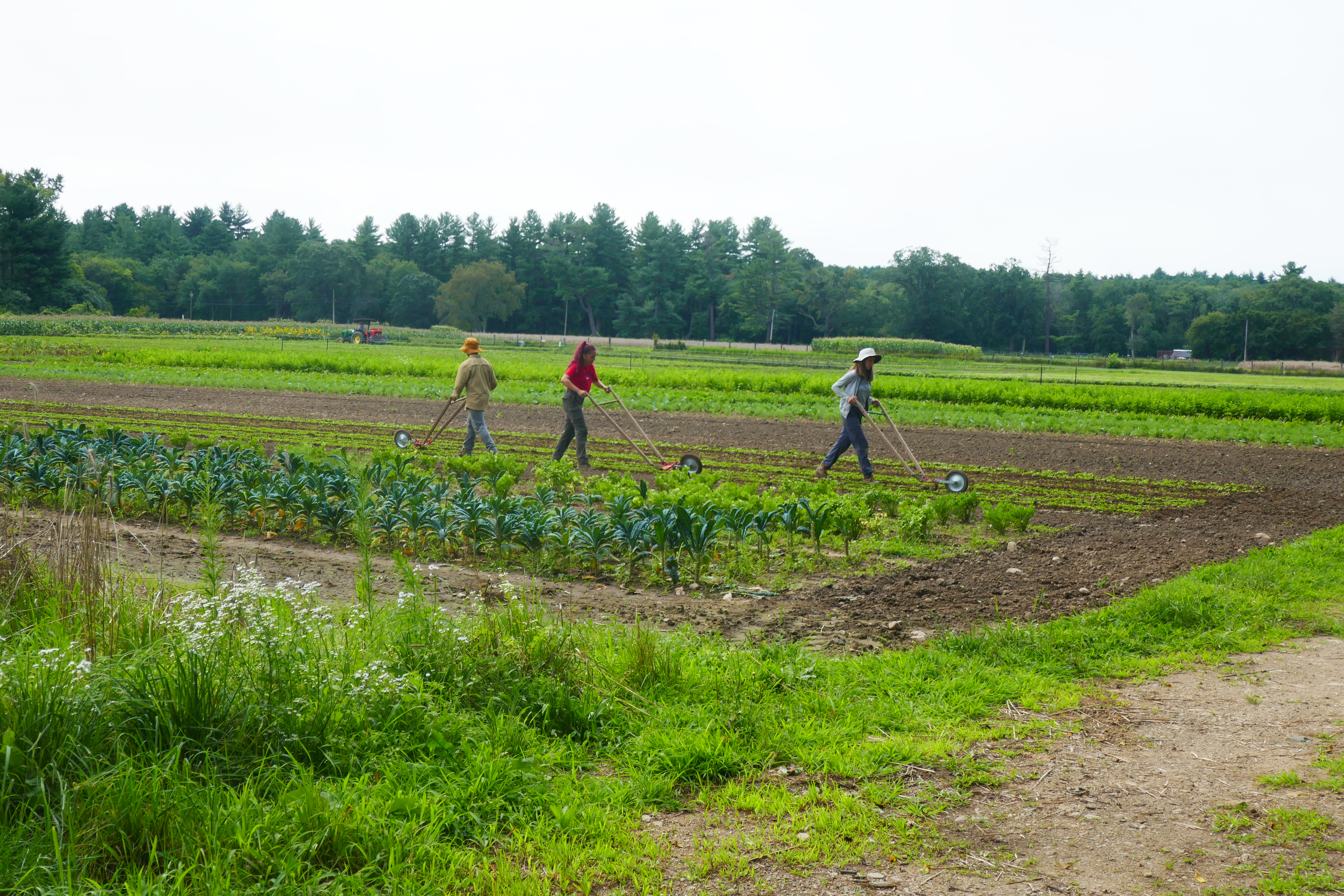
Weeding a field

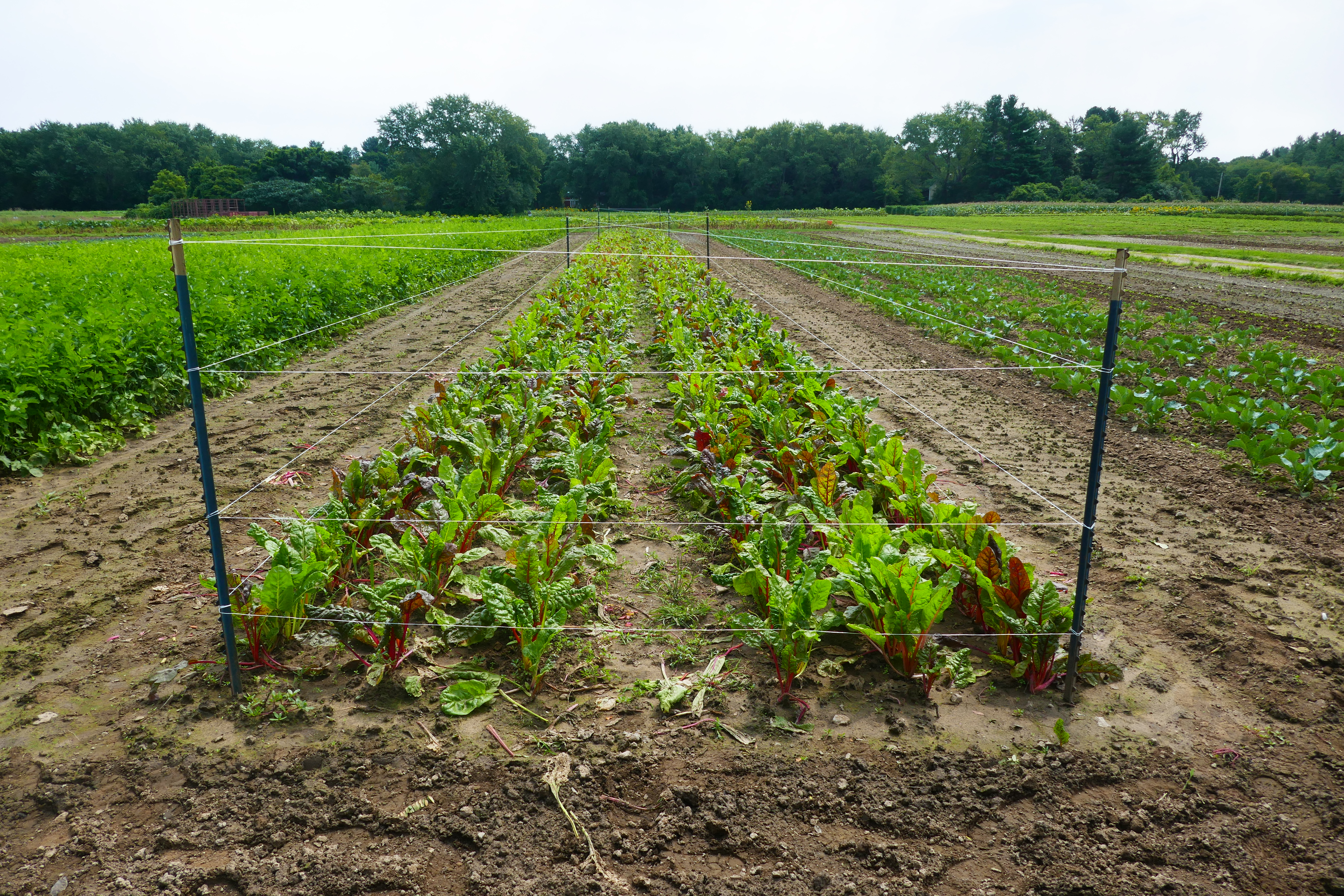
Beets

== Wildlife sanctuary ==
Drumlin Farm's forests and fields are crossed by 4 miles of trails, including a half-mile Farmyard Loop that is universally accessible. The Drumlin Loop Trail leads to the top of the glacial drumlin for which the farm is named. The Bay Circuit Trail passes through the western part of the Drumlin Farm woods. The farm's Wildlife Care Center has facilities to care for injured animals that cannot survive in the wild. The farm offers educational programs in wildlife care for teenagers and for college students who are considering a career in the field.

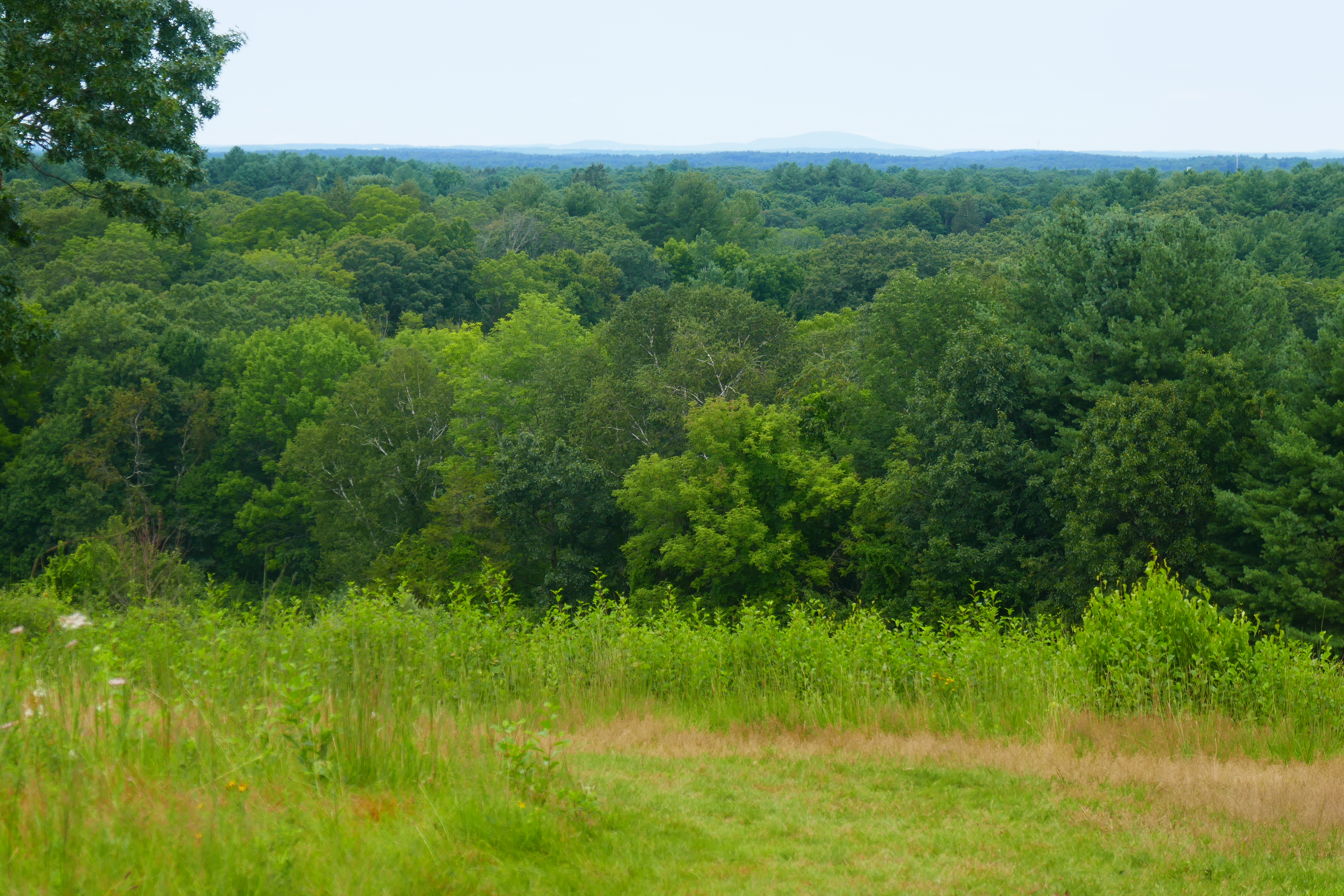
View of Mt. Wachusett from the drumlin

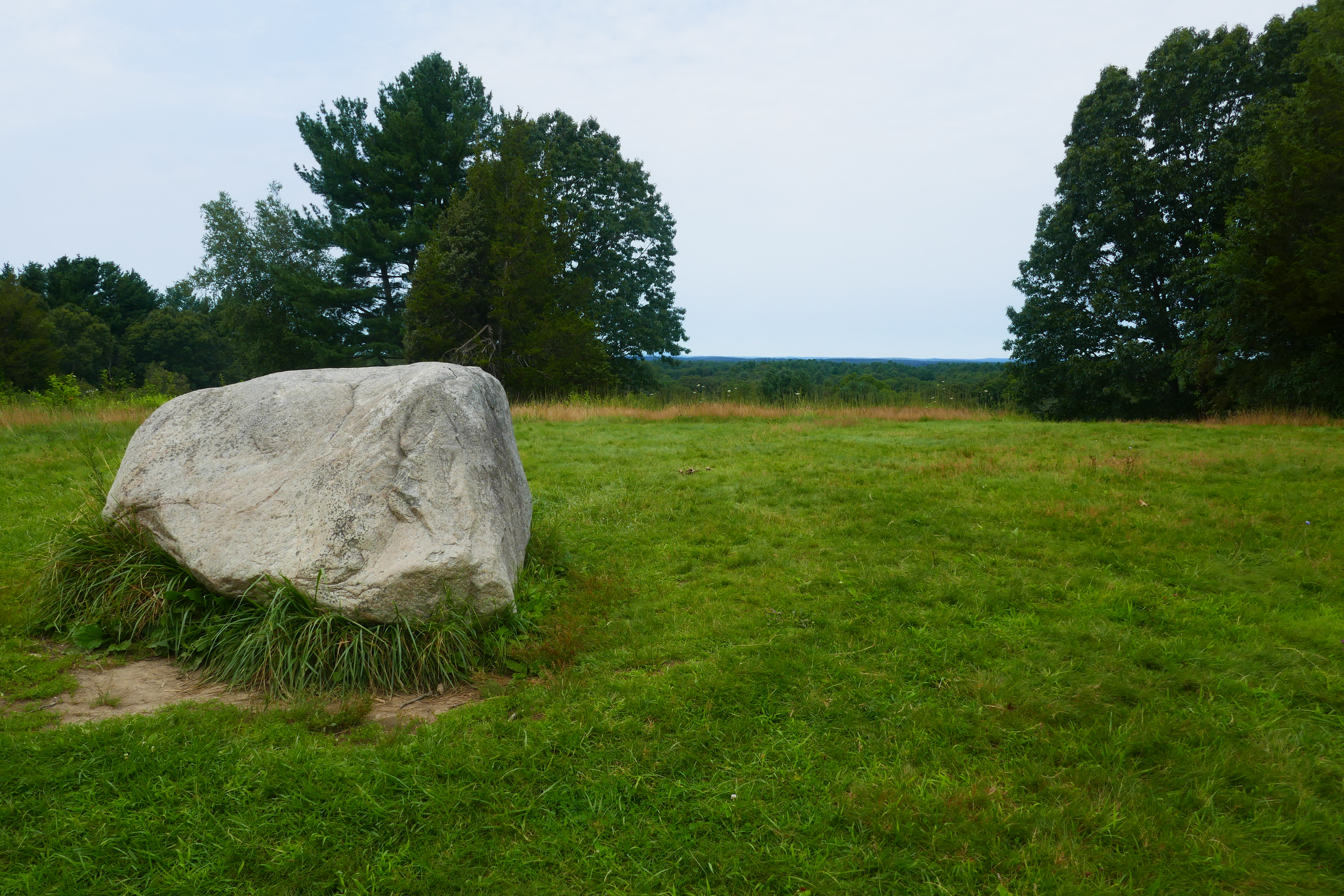
Glacial erratic at the summit of the drumlin

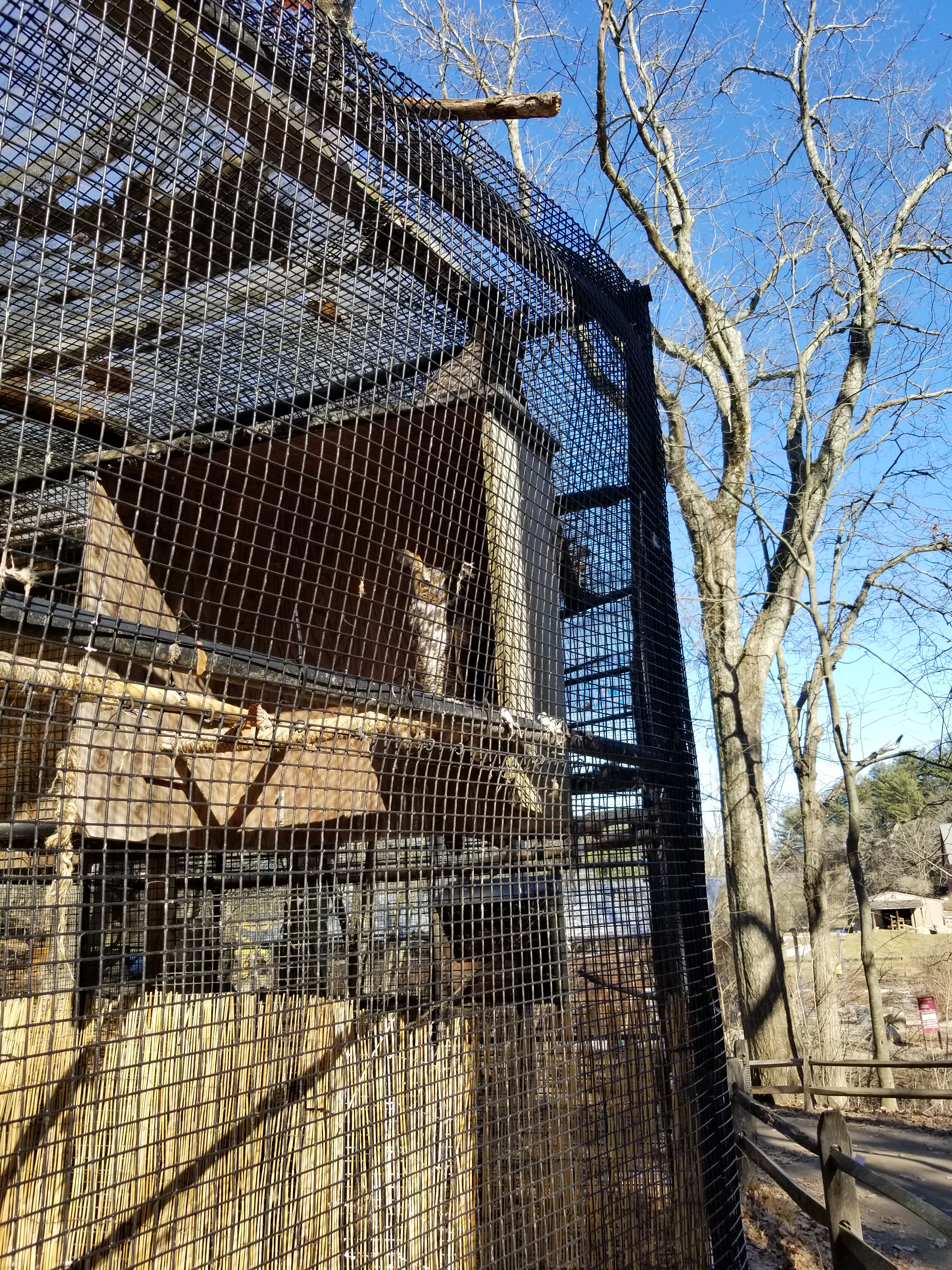
Injured owl at the exhibit on Bird Hill
