= 20th Quebec Legislature =

The 20th Legislative Assembly of Quebec was the provincial legislature in Quebec, Canada that existed from August 17, 1936, to October 25, 1939. The Union Nationale led by Maurice Duplessis was the governing party for the first time ever.

== Seats per political party ==
- After the 1936 elections

Affiliation	Members
Union Nationale	76
Parti libéral du Québec	14
Total	90
Government Majority	62

== Member list ==
This was the list of members of the Legislative Assembly of Quebec that were elected in the 1936 election:

Name	Party	Riding	First elected / previously elected	No. of terms
Émile Lesage	Union Nationale	Abitibi	1936	1st term
Georges-Étienne Dansereau	Libéral	Argenteuil	1935	2nd term
Joseph-David Gagné	Union Nationale	Arthabaska	1936	1st term
Cyrille Dumaine	Libéral	Bagot	1935	2nd term
Philippe Adam (1938)	Union Nationale	Bagot	1938	1st term
Raoul Poulin	Union Nationale	Beauce	1936	1st term
Joseph-Emile Perron (1937)	Union Nationale	Beauce	1937	1st term
Delpha Sauvé	Union Nationale	Beauharnois	1935	2nd term
Émile Boiteau	Union Nationale	Bellechasse	1936	1st term
Cléophas Bastien	Libéral	Berthier	1927	4th term
Henri Jolicoeur	Union Nationale	Bonaventure	1936	1st term
Jonathan Robinson	Union Nationale	Brome	1936	1st term
Hortensius Béïque	Union Nationale	Chambly	1931, 1936	2nd term*
Ulphée-Wilbrod Rousseau	Union Nationale	Champlain	1935	2nd term
Arthur Leclerc	Union Nationale	Charlevoix—Saguenay	1936	1st term
Auguste Boyer	Union Nationale	Châteauguay	1936	1st term
Arthur Larouche	Union Nationale	Chicoutimi	1935	2nd term
Antonio Talbot (1938)	Union Nationale	Chicoutimi	1938	1st term
Payson Sherman	Union Nationale	Compton	1935	2nd term
Paul Sauvé	Union Nationale	Deux-Montagnes	1930, 1936	3rd term*
Joseph-Damase Bégin	Union Nationale	Dorchester	1935	2nd term
Joseph Marier	Union Nationale	Drummond	1936	1st term
Patrice Tardif	Union Nationale	Frontenac	1935	2nd term
Joseph-Alphonse Pelletier	Union Nationale	Gaspé-Nord	1936	1st term
Camille-Eugène Pouliot	Union Nationale	Gaspé-Sud	1936	1st term
Georges-Adélard Auger	Union Nationale	Gatineau	1936	1st term
Alexandre Taché	Union Nationale	Hull	1936	1st term
Martin Fisher	Union Nationale	Huntingdon	1930	4th term
Lucien Lamoureux	Libéral	Iberville	1923	5th term
Hormisdas Langlais	Union Nationale	Îles-de-la-Madeleine	1936	1st term
Anatole Carignan	Union Nationale	Jacques-Cartier	1936	1st term
Antonio Barrette	Union Nationale	Joliette	1936	1st term
René Chaloult	Union Nationale	Kamouraska	1936	1st term
René Chaloult	Parti National	Kamouraska	1936	1st term
Albiny Paquette	Union Nationale	Labelle	1935	2nd term
Joseph-Léonard Duguay	Union Nationale	Lac-Saint-Jean	1935	2nd term
Adhémar Raynault	Union Nationale	L'Assomption	1936	1st term
François Leduc	Union Nationale	Laval	1935	2nd term
François Leduc	Libéral	Laval	1935	2nd term
Charles Romulus Ducharme	Union Nationale	Laviolette	1935	2nd term
Joseph-Théophile Larochelle	Union Nationale	Lévis	1935	2nd term
Joseph Bilodeau	Union Nationale	L'Islet	1936	1st term
Maurice Pelletier	Union Nationale	Lotbinière	1936	1st term
William Tremblay	Union Nationale (Note: First elected as a Labour candidate)	Maisonneuve	1927, 1935	3rd term*
Joseph-Napoléon Caron	Union Nationale	Maskinongé	1936	1st term
Onésime Gagnon	Union Nationale	Matane	1936	1st term
Ferdinand Paradis	Union Nationale	Matapédia	1936	1st term
Tancrède Labbé	Union Nationale	Mégantic	1935	2nd term
François A. Pouliot	Union Nationale	Missisquoi	1935	2nd term
Maurice Tellier	Union Nationale	Montcalm	1936	1st term
Joseph-Ernest Grégoire	Union Nationale	Montmagny	1935	2nd term
Joseph-Ernest Grégoire	Parti National	Montmagny	1935	2nd term
Joseph-Félix Roy	Union Nationale	Montmorency	1936	1st term
Grégoire Bélanger	Union Nationale	Montréal-Dorion	1935	2nd term
Grégoire Bélanger	Action libérale nationale	Montréal-Dorion	1935	2nd term
Charles-Auguste Bertrand	Libéral	Montréal-Laurier	1936	1st term
Gérard Thibeault	Union Nationale	Montréal-Mercier	1936	1st term
Francis Lawrence Connors	Libéral	Montréal–Sainte-Anne	1935	2nd term
Candide Rochefort	Union Nationale	Montréal–Sainte-Marie	1935	2nd term
Gilbert Layton	Union Nationale	Montréal–Saint-Georges	1936	1st term
Gilbert Layton	Independent	Montréal–Saint-Georges	1936	1st term
René Labelle	Union Nationale	Montréal–Saint-Henri	1936	1st term
Henry Lemaître Auger	Union Nationale	Montréal–Saint-Jacques	1935	2nd term
Thomas Joseph Coonan	Union Nationale	Montréal–Saint-Laurent	1936	1st term
Peter Bercovitch	Libéral	Montréal–Saint-Louis	1916	7th term
Louis Fitch (1938)	Union Nationale	Montréal–Saint-Louis	1938	1st term
Pierre-Auguste Lafleur	Union Nationale	Montréal-Verdun	1923	5th term
Philippe Monette	Union Nationale	Napierville-Laprairie	1936	1st term
Émery Fleury	Union Nationale	Nicolet	1936	1st term
Roméo Lorrain	Union Nationale	Papineau	1935	2nd term
Edward Charles Lawn	Libéral	Pontiac	1935	2nd term
Bona Dussault	Union Nationale	Portneuf	1935	2nd term
Adolphe Marcoux	Union Nationale	Québec-Comté	1936	1st term
Adolphe Marcoux	Parti National	Québec-Comté	1936	1st term
Philippe Hamel	Union Nationale	Québec-Centre	1935	2nd term
Philippe Hamel	Parti National	Québec-Centre	1935	2nd term
Oscar Drouin	Union Nationale (Note: First Elected as a Liberal)	Québec-Est	1928	4th term
Oscar Drouin	Parti National	Québec-Est	1928	4th term
Charles Delagrave	Libéral	Québec-Ouest	1935	2nd term
Avila Turcotte	Libéral	Richelieu	1929	4th term
Albert Goudreau	Union Nationale	Richmond	1935	2nd term
Alfred Dubé	Union Nationale	Rimouski	1936	1st term
Léon Casgrain	Libéral	Rivière-du-Loup	1927	4th term
Antoine Castonguay	Union Nationale	Roberval	1935	2nd term
Laurent Barré	Union Nationale	Rouville	1931	3rd term
Télesphore-Damien Bouchard	Libéral	Saint-Hyacinthe	1912, 1923	7th term*
Alexis Bouthillier	Libéral	Saint-Jean	1919	6th term
Marc Trudel	Union Nationale	Saint-Maurice	1935	2nd term
Pierre Bertrand	Union Nationale	Saint-Sauveur	1923, 1931	4th term*
Hector Choquette	Union Nationale	Shefford	1935	2nd term
John Samuel Bourque	Union Nationale	Sherbrooke	1935	2nd term
Édouard Leduc	Union Nationale	Soulanges	1936	1st term
Rouville Beaudry	Union Nationale	Stanstead	1935	2nd term
Henri Gérin (1938)	Union Nationale	Stanstead	1938	1st term
Nil-Élie Larivière	Union Nationale	Témiscamingue	1935	2nd term
Louis-Felix Dubé	Union Nationale	Témiscouata	1936	1st term
Hermann Barrette	Union Nationale	Terrebonne	1936	1st term
Maurice Duplessis	Union Nationale	Trois-Rivières	1927	4th term
Dionel Bellemare	Union Nationale	Vaudreuil	1936	1st term
Félix Messier	Libéral	Verchères	1927	4th term
William Ross Bulloch	Union Nationale	Westmount	1936	1st term
Henri Vachon	Union Nationale	Wolfe	1936	1st term
Antonio Élie	Union Nationale	Yamaska	1931	3rd term

== Other elected MLAs ==
Other MLAs were elected during the term in by-elections

- Joseph-Emile Perron, Union Nationale, Beauce, March 17, 1937
- Philippe Adam, Union Nationale, Bagot, February 16, 1938
- Antonio Talbot, Union Nationale, Chicoutimi, May 25, 1938
- Louis Fitch, Union Nationale, Montréal-Saint-Louis, November 2, 1938
- Henri Gérin, Union Nationale, Stanstead, November 2, 1938

== Cabinet Ministers ==
- Prime Minister and Executive Council President: Maurice Duplessis
- Agriculture: Bona Dussault
- Mines, Hunting and Fishing: Onésime Gagnon (1936)
  - Mines and Fishing: Onésime Gagnon (1936–1939)
- Colonization: Henri Lemaître Auger
- Labour: William Tremblay
- Public Works: John Samuel Bourque
- Lands and Forests: Oscar Drouin (1936–1937), Maurice Duplessis (1937–1938), John Samuel Bourque (1938–1939)
- Health: Albiny Paquette (1936–1939)
- Roads: François-Joseph Leduc (1936–1938), Maurice Duplessis (1938), Anatole Carignan (1938–1939)
- Municipal Affairs, Industry and Commerce: Joseph Bilodeau
- Attorney General: Maurice Duplessis
- Provincial Secretary: Albiny Paquette
- Treasurer: Martin Beattie Fisher
- Members without portfolios: Antonio Élie, Thomas Chapais (1936–1939), Gilbert Layton, Thomas Joseph Coonan

== New electoral districts ==
The electoral map was reformed in 1939 just prior to the elections later that year.

- Châteauguay and Laprairie were merged to form Châteauguay-Laprairie while Napierville which was merged with Laprairie was merged with Saint-Jean to form Saint-Jean-Napierville.
- Kamouraska and Rivière-du-Loup were merged to form Kamouraska-Rivière-du-Loup
- Westmount was split into two new ridings: Montréal-Notre-Dame-de-Grâce and Montréal-Outremont.
- Montréal-Jeanne-Mance was formed from parts of Maisonneuve, Montréal-Mercier and Montréal-Dorion.
- Montréal-Saint-Georges was renamed Westmount-Saint-Georges.
- Richelieu and Verchères was merged to form Richelieu-Vercheres
- Vaudreuil and Soulanges were merged to form Vaudreuil-Soulanges.
