= 19th Quebec Legislature =

The 19th Legislative Assembly of Quebec was the provincial legislature that existed in Quebec, Canada for less than a year from November 25, 1935, to August 17, 1936. The Quebec Liberal Party led by Louis-Alexandre Taschereau was in power for another consecutive term but he was replaced a few months before the elections by Adélard Godbout. However, it was the Liberals' final term before being defeated in 1936 by Maurice Duplessis' Union Nationale which was formed as a result of a merger between the Action libérale nationale and the Quebec Conservative Party between the 1935 and 1936 elections.

== Seats per political party ==
- After the 1935 elections

Affiliation	Members
Liberal	48
Action libérale nationale	26
Conservative	16
Total	90
Government Majority	22

== Member list ==
This was the list of members of the Legislative Assembly of Quebec that were elected in the 1935 election:

Name	Party	Riding	First elected / previously elected	No. of terms
Hector Authier	Libéral	Abitibi	1923	4th term
Georges-Étienne Dansereau	Libéral	Argenteuil	1935	1st term
Joseph-Édouard Perrault	Libéral	Arthabaska	1925	4th term
Cyrille Dumaine	Libéral	Bagot	1935	1st term
Vital Cliche	Action libérale nationale	Beauce	1935	1st term
Delpha Sauvé	Conservative	Beauharnois	1935	1st term
Robert Taschereau	Libéral	Bellechasse	1930	3rd term
Cléophas Bastien	Libéral	Berthier	1927	3rd term
Pierre-Émile Côté	Libéral	Bonaventure	1924	4th term
Ralph Frederick Stockwell	Libéral	Brome	1931	2nd term
Alexandre Thurber	Libéral	Chambly	1923, 1935	3rd term*
Ulphée-Wilbrod Rousseau	Action libérale nationale	Champlain	1935	1st term
Edgar Rochette	Libéral	Charlevoix et Saguenay	1927	3rd term
Honoré Mercier Jr.	Libéral	Châteauguay	1907, 1908	9th term*
Arthur Larouche	Action libérale nationale	Chicoutimi	1935	1st term
Payson Sherman	Conservative	Compton	1935	1st term
Jean-Léo Rochon	Libéral	Deux-Montagnes	1935	1st term
Joseph-Damase Bégin	Action libérale nationale	Dorchester	1935	1st term
Arthur Rajotte	Libéral	Drummond	1935	1st term
Patrice Tardif	Action libérale nationale	Frontenac	1935	1st term
Thomas Côté	Libéral	Gaspé-Nord	1931	2nd term
Alexandre Chouinard	Libéral	Gaspé-Sud	1931	2nd term
Joseph-Barthélemi Merleau	Libéral	Gatineau	1935	1st term
Alexis Caron	Libéral	Hull	1935	1st term
Martin Fisher	Conservative	Huntingdon	1930	3rd term
Lucien Lamoureux	Libéral	Iberville	1923	4th term
Amédée Caron	Libéral	Îles-de-la-Madeleine	1928	3rd term
Frederick Arthur Monk	Action libérale nationale	Jacques-Cartier	1935	1st term
Lucien Dugas	Libéral	Joliette	1927	3rd term
Pierre Gagnon	Libéral	Kamouraska	1927	3rd term
Albiny Paquette	Action libérale nationale	Labelle	1935	1st term
Joseph-Léonard Duguay	Conservative	Lac-Saint-Jean	1935	1st term
Paul Gouin	Action libérale nationale	L'Assomption	1935	1st term
François Leduc	Conservative	Laval	1935	1st term
Charles Romulus Ducharme	Action libérale nationale	Laviolette	1935	1st term
Joseph-Théophile Larochelle	Action libérale nationale	Lévis	1935	1st term
Adélard Godbout	Libéral	L'Islet	1929	3rd term
Joseph-Napoléon Francoeur	Libéral	Lotbinière	1908	8th term
William Tremblay	Conservative (Note: First elected as a Labour candidate)	Maisonneuve	1927, 1935	2nd term*
Louis-Joseph Thisdel	Libéral	Maskinongé	1930	3rd term
Joseph-Arthur Bergeron	Libéral	Matane	1923	4th term
Joseph Dufour	Libéral	Matapédia	1919	5th term
Tancrède Labbé	Action libérale nationale	Mégantic	1935	1st term
François A. Pouliot	Conservative	Missisquoi	1935	1st term
Jean-Gaetan Daniel	Libéral	Montcalm	1935	1st term
Joseph-Ernest Grégoire	Action libérale nationale	Montmagny	1935	1st term
Louis-Alexandre Taschereau	Libéral	Montmorency	1900	10th term
Grégoire Bélanger	Action libérale nationale	Montréal-Dorion	1935	1st term
Zénon Lesage	Action libérale nationale	Montréal-Laurier	1935	1st term
Anatole Plante	Libéral	Montréal-Mercier	1927	3rd term
Francis Lawrence Connors	Libéral	Montréal–Sainte-Anne	1935	1st term
Candide Rochefort	Action libérale nationale	Montréal–Sainte-Marie	1935	1st term
Charles Ernest Gault	Conservative	Montréal–Saint-Georges	1907	9th term
Wilfrid-Eldège Lauriault	Action libérale nationale	Montréal–Saint-Henri	1935	1st term
Henry Lemaître Auger	Conservative	Montréal–Saint-Jacques	1935	1st term
Joseph Cohen	Libéral	Montréal–Saint-Laurent	1927	3rd term
Peter Bercovitch	Libéral	Montréal–Saint-Louis	1916	6th term
Pierre-Auguste Lafleur	Conservative	Montréal-Verdun	1923	4th term
Joseph-Euclide Charbonneau	Libéral	Napierville-Laprairie	1923	4th term
Alexandre Gaudet	Libéral	Nicolet	1933	2nd term
Roméo Lorrain	Action libérale nationale	Papineau	1935	1st term
Edward Charles Lawn	Libéral	Pontiac	1935	1st term
Bona Dussault	Action libérale nationale	Portneuf	1935	1st term
Francis Bryne	Libéral	Québec-Comté	1935	1st term
Philippe Hamel	Action libérale nationale	Québec-Centre	1935	1st term
Oscar Drouin	Action libérale nationale (Note: First Elected as a Liberal)	Québec-Est	1928	3rd term
Charles Delagrave	Libéral	Québec-Ouest	1935	1st term
Avila Turcotte	Libéral	Richelieu	1929	3rd term
Albert Goudreau	Conservative	Richmond	1935	1st term
Louis-Joseph Moreault	Libéral	Rimouski	1923	4th term
Léon Casgrain	Libéral	Rivière-du-Loup	1927	3rd term
Antoine Castonguay	Action libérale nationale	Roberval	1935	1st term
Laurent Barré	Conservative	Rouville	1931	2nd term
Télesphore-Damien Bouchard	Libéral	Saint-Hyacinthe	1912, 1923	6th term*
Alexis Bouthillier	Libéral	Saint-Jean	1919	5th term
Marc Trudel	Action libérale nationale	Saint-Maurice	1935	1st term
Pierre Bertrand	Conservative	Saint-Sauveur	1923, 1931	3rd term*
Hector Choquette	Action libérale nationale	Shefford	1935	1st term
John Samuel Bourque	Action libérale nationale	Sherbrooke	1935	1st term
Avila Ferland	Libéral	Soulanges	1916, 1927	5th term*
Rouville Beaudry	Action libérale nationale	Stanstead	1935	1st term
Nil-Élie Larivière	Action libérale nationale	Témiscamingue	1935	1st term
Joseph-Alpohnse Beaulieu	Libéral	Témiscouata	1935	1st term
Athanase David	Libéral	Terrebonne	1916	6th term
Maurice Duplessis	Conservative	Trois-Rivières	1927	3rd term
Elzéar Sabourin	Libéral	Vaudreuil	1931	2nd term
Félix Messier	Libéral	Verchères	1927	3rd term
Charles Allan Smart	Conservative	Westmount	1912	7th term
Thomas Hercule Lapointe	Libéral	Wolfe	1933	2nd term
Antonio Élie	Conservative	Yamaska	1931	2nd term

== Other elected MLAs ==
No other MLAs were elected in by-elections during the term

== Cabinet Ministers ==
=== Taschereau Cabinet (1935-1936) ===
- Prime Minister and Executive Council President: Louis-Alexandre Taschereau
- Agriculture: Adélard Godbout
- Colonization, Hunting and Fishing: Hector Laferté
- Labour: Charles-Joseph Arcand (1935), Joseph-Napoleon Francoeur (1935-1936), Edgar Rochette (1936)
- Colonization: Irénée Vautrin (1935), Joseph-Edouard Perrault (1935-1936), Hector Authier (1936)
- Public Works, Hunting and Fishing: Joseph-Napoléon Francoeur (1934-1935)
- Mines:Joseph-Edouard Perrault (1935-1936), Joseph-Napoleon Francoeur (1936)
- Lands and Forests: Honoré Mercier Jr
- Roads: Joseph-Édouard Perrault (1935-1936), Pierre-Emile Cote (1936)
- Municipal Affairs, Industry and Commerce: Télesphore-Damien Bouchard
- Attorney General: Louis-Alexandre Taschereau (1935-1936), Joseph-Edouard Perrault (1936)
- Provincial secretary: Athanase David
- Treasurer: Louis-Alexandre Taschereau (1931-1932), Ralph Frederick Stockwell (1932-1935)
- Members without portfolios: Cleophas Bastien (1936)

=== Godbout Cabinet (1936) ===
- Prime Minister and Executive Council President: Adélard Godbout
- Agriculture and Colonization: Adélard Godbout
- Labour, Hunting and Fishing: Edgar Rochette
- Public Works and Mines: Césaire Gervais
- Roads: Pierre-Émile Côté
- Municipal Affairs, Lands and Forests: Télesphore-Damien Bouchard
- Industry and Commerce: Wilfrid Gagnon
- Attorney General and provincial secretary: Charles-Auguste Bertrand
- Treasurer: Edward Stuart McDougall
- Members without portfolios: Frank Lawrence Connors, Cléophas Bastien
