= 18th Quebec Legislature =

The 18th Quebec Legislature is the provincial legislature that existed in Quebec, Canada from August 24, 1931, to October 30, 1935. The Liberal Party led by Louis-Alexandre Taschereau had a majority of seats in the Legislative Assembly of Quebec and remained in power in the government.

== Seats per political party ==
- After the 1931 elections

Affiliation	Members
Liberal	79
Conservative	11
Total	90
Government Majority	68

== Member list ==
This was the list of members of the Legislative Assembly of Quebec that were elected in the 1931 election:

Name	Party	Riding	First elected / previously elected	No. of terms
Hector Authier	Liberal	Abitibi	1923	3rd term
Georges-Étienne Dansereau	Liberal	Argenteuil	1927	2nd term
Joseph-Édouard Perrault	Liberal	Arthabaska	1925	3rd term
Joseph-Émery Phaneuf	Liberal	Bagot	1916	5th term
Joseph-Edouard Fortin	Liberal	Beauce	1929	2nd term
Gontran Saint-Onge	Liberal	Beauharnois	1931	1st term
Robert Taschereau	Liberal	Bellechasse	1930	2nd term
Cléophas Bastien	Liberal	Berthier	1927	2nd term
Pierre-Émile Côté	Liberal	Bonaventure	1924	3rd term
Ralph Frederick Stockwell	Liberal	Brome	1931	1st term
Hortensius Béïque	Conservative	Chambly	1931	1st term
William-Pierre Grant	Liberal	Champlain	1925	3rd term
Edgar Rochette	Liberal	Charlevoix et Saguenay	1927	2nd term
Honoré Mercier Jr.	Liberal	Châteauguay	1907, 1908	8th term*
Gustave Delisle	Liberal	Chicoutimi	1923	3rd term
William James Duffy	Liberal	Compton	1931	1st term
Paul Sauvé	Conservative	Deux-Montagnes	1930	2nd term
Ernest Ouellet	Liberal	Dorchester	1931	1st term
Hector Laferté	Liberal	Drummond	1916	5th term
Henri-Louis Gagnon	Liberal	Frontenac	1931	1st term
Thomas Côté	Liberal	Gaspé-Nord	1931	1st term
Alexandre Chouinard	Liberal	Gaspé-Sud	1931	1st term
Augustin-Armand Legault	Liberal	Gatineau	1931	1st term
Aimé Guertin	Conservative	Hull	1927	2nd term
Aimé Guertin	Independent	Hull	1927	2nd term
Martin Beattie Fisher	Conservative	Huntingdon	1930	2nd term
Lucien Lamoureux	Liberal	Iberville	1923	3rd term
Amédée Caron	Liberal	Îles-de-la-Madeleine	1928	2nd term
Victor Marchand	Liberal	Jacques-Cartier	1925	3rd term
Joseph-Théodule Rhéaume (1933)	Liberal	Jacques-Cartier	1933	1st term
Lucien Dugas	Liberal	Joliette	1927	2nd term
Pierre Gagnon	Liberal	Kamouraska	1927	2nd term
Pierre Lortie	Liberal	Labelle	1923	3rd term
Joseph-Ludger Fillion	Liberal	Lac-Saint-Jean	1931	1st term
Walter Reed	Liberal	L'Assomption	1908	7th term
Joseph Filion	Liberal	Laval	1931	1st term
Joseph-Alphida Crête	Liberal	Laviolette	1931	1st term
Arthur Bélanger	Liberal	Lévis	1931	1st term
Adélard Godbout	Liberal	L'Islet	1929	2nd term
Joseph-Napoléon Francoeur	Liberal	Lotbinière	1908	7th term
Charles-Joseph Arcand	Liberal	Maisonneuve	1931	1st term
Louis-Joseph Thisdel	Liberal	Maskinongé	1930	2nd term
Joseph-Arthur Bergeron	Liberal	Matane	1923	3rd term
Joseph Dufour	Liberal	Matapédia	1919	4th term
Lauréat Lapierre	Liberal	Mégantic	1916	5th term
Alexandre Saurette	Liberal	Missisquoi	1919	4th term
Médéric Duval	Liberal	Montcalm	1931	1st term
Charles-Abraham Paquet	Liberal	Montmagny	1919	4th term
Louis-Alexandre Taschereau	Liberal	Montmorency	1900	9th term
Joseph-Achille Francoeur	Liberal	Montréal-Dorion	1931	1st term
Ernest Poulin	Liberal	Montréal-Laurier	1919, 1927	3rd term*
Anatole Plante	Liberal	Montréal-Mercier	1927	2nd term
Joseph Henry Dillon	Liberal	Montréal–Sainte-Anne	1927	2nd term
Gaspard Fauteux	Liberal	Montréal–Sainte-Marie	1931	1st term
Charles Ernest Gault	Conservative	Montréal–Saint-Georges	1907	8th term
Charles Ernest Gault	Independent	Montréal–Saint-Georges	1907	8th term
Joseph-Maurice Gabias	Liberal	Montréal–Saint-Henri	1931	1st term
Irénée Vautrin	Liberal	Montréal–Saint-Jacques	1919, 1927	3rd term*
Joseph Cohen	Liberal	Montréal–Saint-Laurent	1927	2nd term
Peter Bercovitch	Liberal	Montréal–Saint-Louis	1916	5th term
Pierre-Auguste Lafleur	Conservative	Montréal-Verdun	1923	3rd term
Joseph-Euclide Charbonneau	Liberal	Napierville-Laprairie	1923	3rd term
Joseph-Alcide Savoie	Liberal	Nicolet	1923	3rd term
Alexandre Gaudet (1933)	Liberal	Nicolet	1933	1st term
Désiré Lahaie	Liberal	Papineau	1922	4th term
Wallace McDonald	Liberal	Pontiac	1919	4th term
Pierre Gauthier	Liberal	Portneuf	1927	2nd term
Joseph-Ephraim Bédard	Liberal	Québec-Comté	1927	2nd term
Joseph Samson	Liberal	Québec-Centre	1927	2nd term
Oscar Drouin	Liberal	Québec-Est	1928	2nd term
Oscar Drouin	Independent	Québec-Est	1928	2nd term
Joseph Ignatius Power	Liberal	Québec-Ouest	1927	2nd term
Avila Turcotte	Liberal	Richelieu	1929	2nd term
Stanislas-Edmond Desmarais	Liberal	Richmond	1923	3rd term
Louis-Joseph Moreault	Liberal	Rimouski	1923	3rd term
Léon Casgrain	Liberal	Rivière-du-Loup	1927	2nd term
Émile Moreau	Liberal	Roberval	1919	4th term
Laurent Barré	Conservative	Rouville	1931	1st term
Laurent Barré	Independent	Rouville	1931	1st term
Télesphore-Damien Bouchard	Liberal	Saint-Hyacinthe	1912, 1923	5th term*
Alexis Bouthillier	Liberal	Saint-Jean	1919	4th term
Joseph-Auguste Frigon	Liberal	Saint-Maurice	1927	2nd term
Pierre Bertrand	Conservative (Note: First elected as Labour)	Saint-Sauveur	1923, 1931	2nd term*
Robert-Raoul Bachand	Liberal	Shefford	1931	1st term
Émery-Hector Fortier	Liberal	Sherbrooke	1931	1st term
Avila Ferland	Liberal	Soulanges	1916, 1927	4th term*
Alfred-Joseph Bissonnet	Liberal	Stanstead	1913	6th term
Joseph-Édouard Piché	Liberal	Témiscamingue	1927	2nd term
Joseph-Wilfrid Morel	Liberal	Témiscouata	1931	1st term
Athanase David	Liberal	Terrebonne	1916	5th term
Maurice Duplessis	Conservative	Trois-Rivières	1927	2nd term
Elzéar Sabourin	Liberal	Vaudreuil	1931	1st term
Félix Messier	Liberal	Verchères	1927	2nd term
Charles Allan Smart	Conservative	Westmount	1912	6th term
Cyrénus Lemieux	Liberal	Wolfe	1921	4th term
Thomas Hercule Lapointe (1933)	Liberal	Wolfe	1933	1st term
Antonio Élie	Conservative	Yamaska	1931	1st term

== Other elected MLAs ==
Other MLAs were elected in by-elections during the term

- Alexandre Gaudet, Liberal Party, Nicolet, November 7, 1933
- Thomas Hercule Lapointe, Liberal Party, Wolfe, November 14, 1933
- Joseph-Théodule Rhéaume, Liberal Party, Jacques-Cartier, November 21, 1933

== Cabinet Ministers ==
- Prime Minister and Executive Council President: Louis-Alexandre Taschereau
- Agriculture: Adélard Godbout
- Colonization, Hunting and Fishing: Hector Laferté (1931–1934)
- Public Works and Labor: Joseph-Napoléon Francoeur (1931)
  - Labour: Charles-Joseph Arcand (1931–1935)
  - Colonization: Irénée Vautrin (1934–1935)
  - Public Works, Hunting and Fishing: Joseph-Napoléon Francoeur (1934–1935)
    - Public Works: Joseph-Napoléon Francoeur (1931–1934)
- Mines:Joseph-Édouard Perrault
- Lands and Forests: Honoré Mercier Jr
- Roads: Joseph-Édouard Perrault
- Municipal Affairs: Louis-Alexandre Taschereau (1931–1935)
  - Municipal Affairs, Industry and Commerce: Télesphore-Damien Bouchard (1935)
- Attorney General: Louis-Alexandre Taschereau
- Provincial secretary: Athanase David
- Treasurer: Louis-Alexandre Taschereau (1931–1932), Ralph Frederick Stockwell (1932–1935)
- Members without portfolios: George Bryson Jr. (1931–1935), Irénée Vautrin (1934), John Hall Kelly (1935)
