= Parti National (Quebec) =

Defunct political party in Quebec

- Founded: November 17, 1885
- Dissolved: December 21, 1891
- Ideology: Quebec nationalism Autonomy; Agrarianism
- Colours: Red

The Parti National (French pronunciation: [paʁti nɑsjɔnal]) was the name taken by the Quebec Liberal Party under the premiership of Honoré Mercier.

== Origin and beliefs ==
It was founded on November 17, 1885, the day following the hanging of Métis Leader Louis Riel. Many French-speaking Catholics resented the way the federal government of Sir John A. Macdonald had not granted clemency to Riel, convicted of high treason. Mercier proposed to create a broader coalition which would include Conservative dissidents as well as his Liberal base. In the following days 50,000 people gathered in the Champ de Mars in Montreal to hear Mercier voice their support for Riel.

The Parti National, which was not affiliated with any federal party, promised to use the influence of the provincial government to protect the autonomy of Quebec and of its French-speaking and Catholic identity.

== Rise to power ==
The party won a narrow majority of seats to the Legislative Assembly of Quebec in the 1886 provincial election and took office in January 1887. It won a landslide victory in the 1890 election, doing poorly only in the Mauricie area where it was opposed by Ultramontan Catholic Bishop Louis-François Richer Laflèche.

Its achievements include:

- Organizing the first interprovincial conference in Quebec City in 1887
- Passing the Jesuit Estates Act, which gave the order $400,000 in compensation for loss of property confiscated by the government decades earlier
- Establishing a department of Agriculture and Colonization in 1887 and appointing Curé Labelle as its deputy minister
- Expanding the railroad to support the migration of urban residents to rural parts of Quebec, such as the Laurentides and Gaspésie
- Creating night schools, starting in 1889

== Decline ==
With only 18 months served in its second term of office, the National Party was caught in a corruption scandal and removed from office by Quebec Lieutenant-governor Auguste-Réal Angers. Mercier stepped down as party leader and the Liberals were overwhelmingly defeated in the 1892 election. Mercier was later cleared of all charges.

== Other Partis Nationaux ==
- Mercier had tried to create a "Parti national" in 1872. This first attempt seems to have been short-lived and fruitless.
- Nationalist politicians René Chaloult, Oscar Drouin, Joseph-Ernest Grégoire, Philippe Hamel and Adolphe Marcoux announced the creation of a "Parti National" in 1937, after they had left the Union Nationale. It seems that this effort was abandoned briefly after. Chalout and Drouin ran as Liberals in the 1939 election.

== See also ==
- Politics of Quebec
- National Assembly of Quebec
- List of Quebec general elections
- Timeline of Quebec history
- List of political parties in Quebec
- Liberal Party of Quebec
