= Émile Lesage =

Canadian politician

Member of the Legislative Assembly of Quebec for Abitibi
- In office 1936–1939
- Preceded by: Hector Authier
- Succeeded by: Félix Allard

Member of the Legislative Assembly of Quebec for Abitibi-Ouest
- In office 1944–1956
- Succeeded by: Alcide Courcy

Member of the Legislative Council of Quebec for Montarville
- In office 1956–1963
- Preceded by: Gustave Lemieux
- Succeeded by: Arthur Dupré

Personal details
- Born: February 8, 1904 Louiseville, Quebec
- Died: July 27, 1963 (aged 59) Macamic, Quebec
- Party: Union Nationale

Émile Lesage (February 8, 1904 – July 27, 1963) was a Canadian politician from Quebec.

== Background ==
He was born on February 8, 1904, in Louiseville, Mauricie and was a business person.

== Member of the legislature ==
Lesage ran as a Conservative candidate in the 1935 election for the district of Abitibi, but was defeated by Liberal incumbent Hector Authier. He was elected as a Union Nationale candidate in the 1936 election. He lost his bid for re-election in the 1939 election.

== Legislative Councillor ==
He was appointed to the Legislative Council of Quebec in 1956 and represented the division of Montarville until his death.

== Mayor ==
Lesage served as Mayor of Macamic, Quebec, from 1958 to 1961.

== Death ==
He died on July 27, 1963.
