= Grégoire Bélanger =

Canadian politician

Joseph-Grégoire Bélanger

Member of the Member of the Legislative Assembly for Montréal-Dorion
- In office 1935–1939
- Preceded by: Joseph-Achille Francoeur
- Succeeded by: District was abolished in 1939

Personal details
- Born: April 8, 1889 Saint-Roch-des-Aulnaies, Quebec
- Died: March 17, 1957 (aged 67) Verdun, Quebec
- Party: Action libérale nationale Union Nationale

Joseph-Grégoire Bélanger (April 8, 1889 – March 17, 1957) was a politician Quebec, Canada and a Member of the Legislative Assembly of Quebec (MLA).

== Early life ==
He was born on April 8, 1889, in Saint-Roch-des-Aulnaies and became an optician.

== Member of the legislature ==
He ran as an Action libérale nationale candidate in the district of Montréal-Dorion in the 1935 provincial election and won. Choquette joined Maurice Duplessis's Union Nationale and was re-elected in 1936. He did not run for re-election in 1939.

== Death ==
He died on March 17, 1957.
