= Nil-Élie Larivière =

Canadian politician

Member of the Legislative Assembly of Quebec for Témiscamingue
- In office 1935–1939
- Preceded by: Joseph-Édouard Piché
- Succeeded by: Paul-Oliva Goulet
- In office 1944–1952
- Preceded by: Paul-Oliva Goulet
- Succeeded by: Paul-Oliva Goulet

Personal details
- Born: July 11, 1899 Bonfield, Ontario
- Died: May 3, 1969 (aged 69) Macamic, Quebec
- Party: Action libérale nationale Union Nationale

Nil-Élie Larivière (July 11, 1899 – May 3, 1969) was a politician Quebec, Canada and a Member of the Legislative Assembly of Quebec (MLA).

== Early life ==
He was born on July 11, 1899, in Bonfield, Ontario, and became a farmer. Larivière moved to Rouyn-Noranda, Abitibi-Témiscamingue in 1925.

== City politics ==
He served as a city councillor in Rouyn in 1926.

== Member of the legislature ==
Larivière ran as an Action libérale nationale candidate in the district of Témiscamingue in the 1935 provincial election and won against incumbent Joseph-Édouard Piché. He joined Maurice Duplessis's Union Nationale and was re-elected in the 1936 election. Larivière was defeated by Liberal candidate Paul-Oliva Goulet in the 1939 election.

He was re-elected in the 1944 and 1948 elections. Larivière lost his bid for re-election in the 1952 election and was succeeded again by Goulet.

== Death ==
He died on May 3, 1969.
