= Maurice Pelletier =

Canadian politician (1896 – 1971)

Member of the National Assembly of Quebec for Lotbinière
- In office 1936–1939
- Preceded by: Joseph-Napoléon Francoeur
- Succeeded by: René Chaloult

Personal details
- Born: May 11, 1896 Saint-Joseph-de-la-Pointe-De Lévy, Lévis, Quebec
- Died: March 22, 1971 (aged 74) Saint-Joseph-de-la-Pointe-De Lévy, Lévis, Quebec
- Party: Union Nationale
- Education: Laval University

Maurice Pelletier (May 11, 1896 – March 22, 1971) was a Canadian politician in Quebec from the Union Nationale. He was a member of the National Assembly of Quebec representing the district of Lotbinière from 1936 to his defeat in 1939. He was a candidate in the 1944 Quebec general election but was unsuccessful.

== See also ==
- 20th Quebec Legislature
