= Roméo Lorrain =

Canadian politician

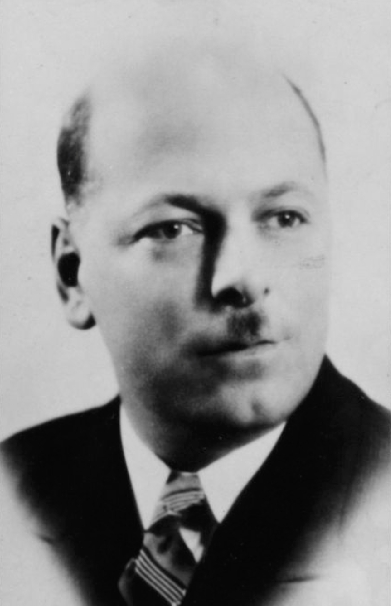
- Roméo Lorrain in 1940

Member of the Legislative Assembly of Quebec for Papineau
- In office 1935–1966
- Preceded by: Désiré Lahaie
- Succeeded by: Roland Théorêt

Personal details
- Born: May 26, 1901 Buckingham, Quebec
- Died: July 6, 1967 (aged 66) Lac-Long, Quebec

Roméo Lorrain (May 26, 1901 – July 6, 1967) was a politician Quebec, Canada and a nine-term Member of the Legislative Assembly of Quebec (MLA).

== Early life ==
He was born on May 26, 1901, in Buckingham, Quebec (now Gatineau, Quebec) and became a farmer. Lorrain was a journalist and a business person.

== Political career ==
He ran as an Action libérale nationale candidate in the district of Papineau in the 1935 provincial election and won. He joined Maurice Duplessis's Union Nationale and was re-elected in the 1936, 1939, 1944, 1948, 1952, 1956, 1960 and 1962 elections. He did not run for re-election in the 1966 election and was succeeded again by Roland Théorêt.

Lorrain was appointed to the Cabinet in 1944, serving as Minister of Public Works until 1960.

== Death ==
He died on July 6, 1967.
