= Dionel Bellemare =

Canadian politician

Member of the Legislative Assembly of Quebec for Vaudreuil
- In office 1936–1939
- Preceded by: Elzéar Sabourin (fr)
- Succeeded by: District was abolished in 1939

Personal details
- Born: March 25, 1880 Yamachiche, Quebec
- Died: November 1, 1950 (aged 70) Montreal, Quebec
- Party: Union Nationale

Dionel Bellemare (March 25, 1880 – November 1, 1950) was a Canadian politician from Quebec.

== Background ==
He was born on March 25, 1880, in Yamachiche, Mauricie and was a physician.

== Mayor ==
Bellemare served as Mayor of Vaudreuil from 1931 to 1934.

== Member of the legislature ==
Bellemare ran as a Conservative candidate in 1935 for the district of Vaudreuil and finished third with 27% of the vote.

He was elected as a Union Nationale candidate in 1936 with 43% of the vote. He did not run in 1939.

== Death ==
He died on November 1, 1950.
