= Henri Gérin =

Canadian politician

Member of the Legislative Assembly of Quebec for Stanstead
- In office 1938–1939
- Preceded by: Rouville Beaudry
- Succeeded by: Raymond-François Frégeau

Personal details
- Born: April 13, 1900 Coaticook, Quebec
- Died: September 2, 1941 (aged 41) Coaticook, Quebec
- Party: Union Nationale

Henri Gérin (April 13, 1900 – September 2, 1941) was a Canadian politician in Quebec, Canada. He was a Member of the Legislative Assembly of Quebec (MLA).

== Early life ==
He was born on April 13, 1900, in Coaticook, Eastern Townships.

== Member of the legislature ==
Gérin ran as a Union Nationale candidate in the provincial district of Stanstead in the by-election held on November 2, 1938, and won. He was defeated in the 1939 election.

== Death ==
He died on September 2, 1941.
