= François Leduc =

Canadian politician (1895–1985)

François-Joseph Leduc
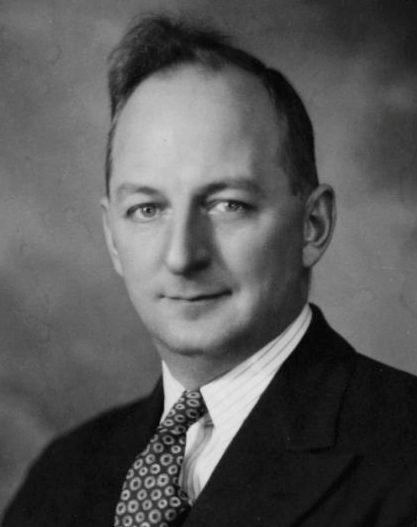

Member of the Legislative Assembly of Quebec for Laval
- In office 1935–1948
- Preceded by: Joseph Filion
- Succeeded by: Omer Barrière

Personal details
- Born: November 21, 1895 Saint-Benoît (Mirabel), Quebec
- Died: February 8, 1985 (aged 89) Outremont, Quebec

François-Joseph Leduc (French pronunciation: [fʁɑ̃swa ʒozɛf lədyk]; November 21, 1895 – February 8, 1985) was a Canadian politician. He was a Member of the provincial legislature and a City Councillor in Montreal, Quebec.

== Background ==
He was born in Montreal on November 21, 1895.

== City Councillor ==
Leduc was elected to the City Council in the district of Ahuntsic in 1934, but did not run for re-election in 1936.

== Member of the legislature ==
He successfully ran as a Conservative candidate in the provincial district of Laval in the 1935 election and was re-elected as a Union Nationale candidate in the 1936 election.

He served as Minister of Transportation from 1936 to 1938, but was dismissed by Prime Minister Maurice Duplessis.

Leduc crossed the floor and joined the Liberals. He was re-elected in the 1939 and 1944 elections, but was defeated in the 1948 election.

== Death ==
He died on February 8, 1985.
