= Rouville Beaudry =

Canadian politician

Member of the Legislative Assembly of Quebec for Stanstead
- In office 1935–1938
- Preceded by: Alfred-Joseph Bissonet
- Succeeded by: Henri Gérin

Personal details
- Born: August 26, 1904 Magog, Quebec
- Died: May 14, 1997 (aged 92) Magog, Quebec
- Party: Action libérale nationale Union Nationale

Rouville Beaudry (August 26, 1904 – May 14, 1997) was a Canadian politician active in Quebec. He was a Member of the Legislative Assembly of Quebec (MLA).

== Career ==
Born in Magog, Estrie, Beaudry ran as an Action libérale nationale candidate in the provincial district of Stanstead in the 1935 provincial election and won against Liberal incumbent Alfred-Joseph Bissonet. He joined Maurice Duplessis's Union Nationale and was re-elected in the 1936 election. Beaudry resigned and left provincial politics in 1938.

He served as a city councillor in Magog from 1944 to 1948.
