= Roméo Gagné =

Canadian politician

Member of the Legislative Assembly of Quebec for Rivière-du-Loup
- In office 1948–1956
- Preceded by: Léon Casgrain
- Succeeded by: Alphonse Couturier

Personal details
- Born: September 15, 1905 Mont-Joli, Quebec
- Died: August 2, 1959 (aged 53) Rivière-du-Loup, Quebec
- Party: Union Nationale

Roméo Gagné (French pronunciation: [ʁɔmeo ɡaɲe]; September 15, 1905 – August 2, 1959) was a Canadian politician and a two-term Member of the Legislative Assembly of Quebec.

== Background ==
He was born on September 15, 1905, in Mont-Joli, Bas-Saint-Laurent.

== City Councillor ==
Gagné was a city councillor in Rivière-du-Loup from 1945 to 1951.

== Member of the legislature ==
He ran as a Union Nationale candidate in the 1944 and 1948 elections against Liberal incumbent Léon Casgrain in the district of Rivière-du-Loup. He lost the first time, but was successful on his second attempt.

Gagné was re-elected in the 1952 election, but did not run for re-election in the 1956 election.

== Death ==
Casgrain died on August 2, 1959.
