= Francis Lawrence Connors =

Canadian politician

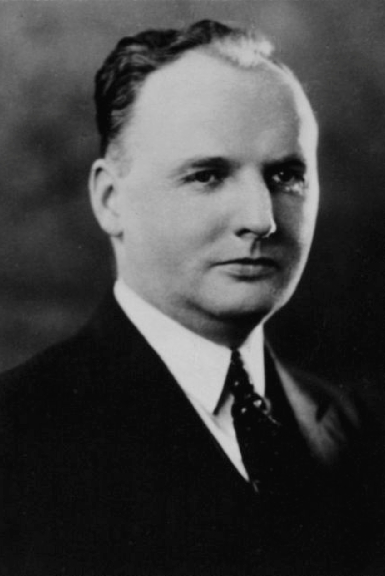

Member of the Legislative Assembly of Quebec for Montréal–Sainte-Anne
- In office 1935–1942
- Preceded by: Joseph Henry Dillon
- Succeeded by: Thomas Guérin

Member of the Legislative Council of Quebec for Mille-Isles
- In office 1942–1964

Personal details
- Born: November 14, 1891 Ottawa, Ontario
- Died: March 31, 1964 (aged 72) Quebec City, Quebec
- Party: Liberal
- Cabinet: Godbout (1st), Godbout (2nd)
- Portfolio: Without portfolio

Francis Lawrence Connors (November 14, 1891 - March 31, 1964), also known as Frank Connors, was a pharmacist and politician in Quebec, Canada. He was a Liberal Party member to the Legislative Assembly of Quebec from 1935 to 1942 and was a member in both Godbout governments.

== Biography ==
Francis Lawrence Connors was born in Ottawa, the son of Edward John Connors and Esther Moylan. He studied at the universities of Ottawa, Toronto, Manitoba and Saskatchewan. He married Irène O'Connell in St. Patrick church in Montreal June 8, 1921.

He exercised his profession of pharmacist-chemist in Montreal.

Connors was elected as a Liberal Party member to the Legislative Assembly of Quebec in the electoral district of Montréal–Sainte-Anne in the Quebec general election of November 25, 1935. June 27, 1936, premier Adélard Godbout appointed him as a minister without portfolio in his first government. In the Quebec general election of August 17, 1936, Connors was reelected in his district, but the Liberal Party lost power to the Union nationale. Connors was reelected in the Quebec general election of October 25, 1939, and the Liberal Party was back in power. On November 8, 1939, Godbout appointed him as a minister without portfolio in his second government. On January 14, 1942, his seat in the Legislative Assembly became vacant when Connors was appointed to the Legislative Council of Quebec, for the division of Mille-Isles.

He died in office March 31, 1964, in Quebec City. He was buried in Notre Dame des Neiges Cemetery in Montreal.
