= Ludger Bastien =

Canadian politician (1879–1948)

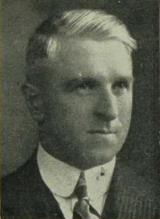
Ludger Bastien in 1926

Ludger Bastien (October 18, 1879 - September 18, 1948) was a Canadian politician, who represented the electoral district of Québec-Comté in the Legislative Assembly of Quebec from 1924 to 1927. He was a member of the Conservative Party of Quebec.

Born at Loretteville, Quebec, he was a member of the Wendat Nation from the neighbouring First Nations reserve at Wendake. Prior to his election to the legislature, he was president of the companies Bastien et Bastien and Bastien, Gagnon et Cloutier, and served as chief of Wendake from 1904 to 1917.

He won the seat of Québec-Comté in a by-election in 1924, following the resignation from the legislature of Aurèle Leclerc, and was the first First Nations MLA ever elected to the provincial legislature. He served until 1927, when he was defeated in the 1927 provincial election. He ran for election to the legislature two more times, as a Conservative in the 1931 election and as a Union Nationale candidate in the 1944 election, but was not reelected to the legislature. In 1933, he was reported as having been added to a list of potential candidates for vacant Quebec seats in the Senate of Canada, but he was not ultimately appointed.

He died in 1948 in Montreal.
