= Cyrille-Fraser Delâge =

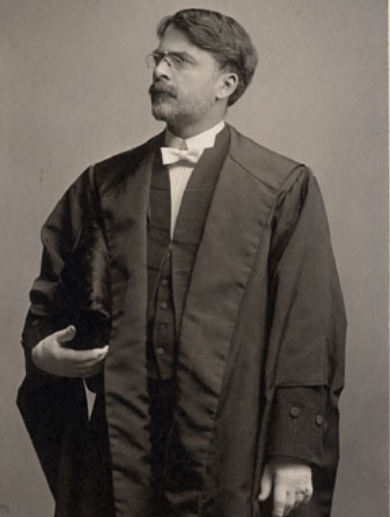

Member of the Legislative Assembly of Quebec for Québec-Comté
- In office 1901–1916
- Preceded by: Némèse Garneau
- Succeeded by: Aurèle Leclerc

Personal details
- Born: May 1, 1869 Quebec City, Quebec
- Died: November 27, 1957 (aged 88) Quebec City, Quebec
- Party: Liberal

Cyrille-Fraser Delâge, CMG (May 1, 1869 – November 27, 1957) was a notary and political figure in Quebec. He represented Québec-Comté in the Legislative Assembly of Quebec from 1901 to 1916 as a Liberal. Delâge was Speaker of the Legislative Assembly from 1912 to 1916.

He was born in Quebec City, Quebec, the son of Jean Baptiste Delâge and Marie Emma-Elmire Fraser. Delâge was educated at the Séminaire de Québec and the Université Laval, qualified as a notary in 1892 and entered practice with his father. In 1894, he married Marie-Célina-Alice Brousseau. From 1936 to 1939, he was president of the Chamber of Notaries.

Delâge was first elected to the Quebec assembly in a 1901 by-election held after Némèse Garneau was named to the Legislative Council. He resigned his seat in the provincial assembly after he was named superintendent of public schools for Quebec.

He was president of the Saint-Jean-Baptiste Society of Quebec in 1909 and 1910. Delâge also served as president of La Société du Parler Français from 1922 to 1924 and was president of the Quebec Geographical Society from 1925 to 1940. He was named a chevalier in the French Légion d'honneur and a companion in the Order of St Michael and St George in 1935. Delâge died in Quebec City at the age of 88.

His sister Marie-Célina-Juliana married Albert Jobin.
