= Francis Byrne (politician) =

Canadian politician

Francis Byrne (December 7, 1877 – March 28, 1938) was a politician in Quebec, serving as a Liberal member of the Legislative Assembly of Quebec.

He was mayor of Charlesbourg, Quebec (today part of Quebec City) from 1921 to 1932, and mayor of Québec Ouest from 1932 to 1936.

He was elected to the Legislative Assembly in Québec-Comté electoral district in the 1935 election but lost in the 1936 election.
