= Joseph-Ernest Grégoire =

Canadian politician

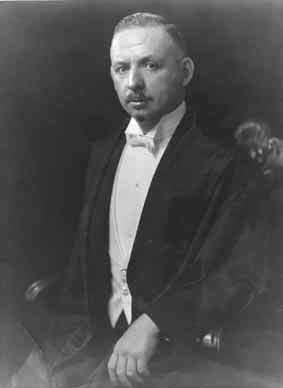

Member of the Legislative Assembly of Quebec for Montmagny
- In office 1935–1939
- Preceded by: Charles-Abraham Paquet
- Succeeded by: Fernand Choquette

Mayor of Quebec City
- In office 1934–1938
- Preceded by: Henri-Edgar Lavigueur
- Succeeded by: Lucien-Hubert Borne

Personal details
- Born: July 31, 1886 Disraëli, Quebec
- Died: September 17, 1980 (aged 94) Quebec City, Quebec

Joseph-Ernest Grégoire CBE (French pronunciation: [ʒozɛf ɛʁnɛst ɡʁeɡwaʁ]; July 31, 1886 – September 17, 1980) was a French Canadian politician.

== Background ==
He was born in Disraeli, Quebec on July 31, 1886. He was an attorney and a professor. Member of the Barreau du Quebec in 1913, he practised law from 1938 to 1966.

== Mayor of Quebec ==
Grégoire ran for mayor in Quebec City in 1934 and won, defeating Pierre Bertrand. He was reelected in the 1936 election, defeating Lucien Borne. He ran again in the 1938 election, but this time he was defeated by Lucien Borne.

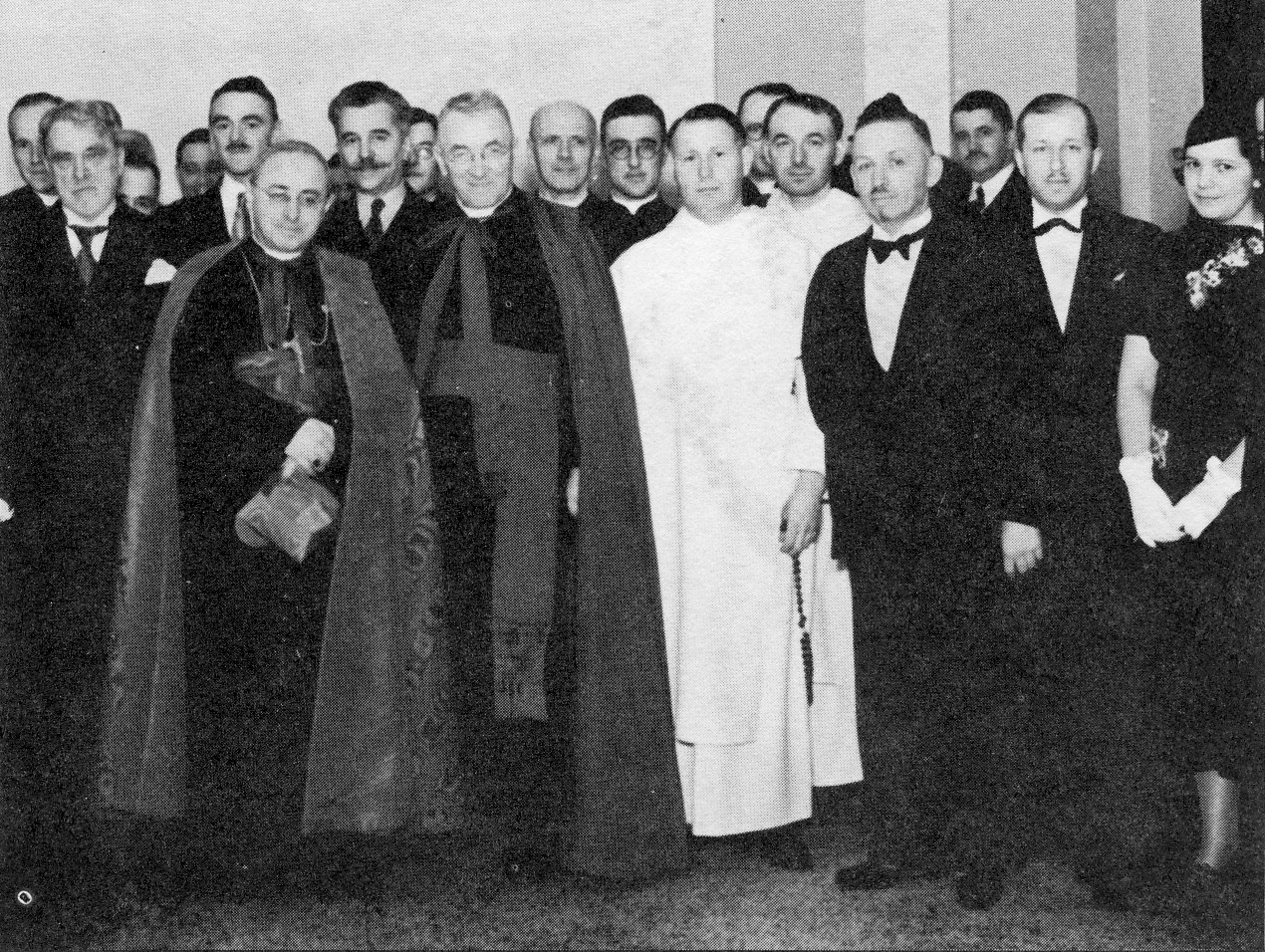
In 1938, upon the announcement of the founding of the School of Social Sciences at Laval University

== Member of the legislature ==
He was elected as the Action libérale nationale candidate to the Legislative Assembly of Quebec in 1935 in the riding of Montmagny. He was re-elected in 1936 as the Union Nationale candidate.

In 1937, he and colleagues René Chaloult, Oscar Drouin, Philippe Hamel and Adolphe Marcoux left the Union Nationale. They founded a short-lived party that was called Parti national. Grégoire did not run for re-election in 1939.

== Death ==
He died on September 17, 1980.

== Family ==
He was the father of Gilles Grégoire.

== Honors ==
In 1934, Grégoire was made a Chevalier of the Légion d'honneur. In the 1935 New Year Honours, he was made a Commander of the Order of the British Empire.
