= Bernard-Augustin Conroy =

Canadian physician and politician

Member of the Legislative Assembly of Quebec for Montréal–Sainte-Anne
- In office 1919–1923
- Preceded by: Denis Tansey
- Succeeded by: William James Hushion

Personal details
- Born: April 23, 1882 Montreal, Quebec
- Died: January 26, 1949 (aged 66) Montreal, Quebec
- Party: Liberal

Bernard-Augustin Conroy (April 23, 1882 – January 26, 1949) was a Canadian physician and politician.

Born in Montreal, Quebec, Conroy was educated at the Sarsfield School, Loyola College and McGill University. He became a physician in 1906 and was employed by the Canada Steamship Lines. He was elected to the Legislative Assembly of Quebec for the riding of Montréal–Sainte-Anne in 1919. A Liberal, he did not run in 1923.

From 1922 to 1949, he was the Chief of Medicine for the Montreal Police.
