= François A. Pouliot =

Canadian politician

Member of the Legislative Assembly of Quebec for Missisquoi
- In office 1935–1939
- Preceded by: Alexandre Saurette
- Succeeded by: Henri Gosselin

Personal details
- Born: June 6, 1896 Holyoke, Massachusetts
- Died: March 11, 1990 (aged 93) Mont-Royal, Quebec
- Party: Conservative; Union Nationale

François A. Pouliot (June 6, 1896 – March 11, 1990) was a Canadian politician and a two-term Member of the Legislative Assembly of Quebec.

== Background ==
He was born in Holyoke, Massachusetts on June 6, 1896.

== Political career ==
Pouliot ran as a Conservative candidate in the provincial district of Missisquoi in the 1931 and 1935 elections. He succeeded on his second attempt.

He joined Maurice Duplessis's Union Nationale and was re-elected in the 1936 election. He served as his party's House Whip until his defeat in the 1939 election.

== Death ==
He died on March 11, 1990.
