= Kamouraska—Rivière-du-Loup (provincial electoral district) =

Coordinates: 47.825°N 69.525°W

Kamouraska–Rivière-du-Loup
Quebec electoral district

Defunct provincial electoral district
- Legislature: National Assembly of Quebec
- District created: 1939
- District abolished: 1944
- First contested: 1939
- Last contested: 1939

Kamouraska–Rivière-du-Loup (French pronunciation: [kamuʁaska ʁivjɛʁ dy lu]) was a former provincial electoral district in the Bas-Saint-Laurent region of Quebec, Canada.

It was created for the 1939 election, from parts of the Kamouraska and Rivière-du-Loup electoral districts. It existed only for that one election. It disappeared in the 1944 election and its successor electoral districts were the re-created Kamouraska and Rivière-du-Loup.

== Members of the Legislative Assembly ==
- Léon Casgrain, Liberal (1939–1944)
