= Adolphe Marcoux =

Canadian politician

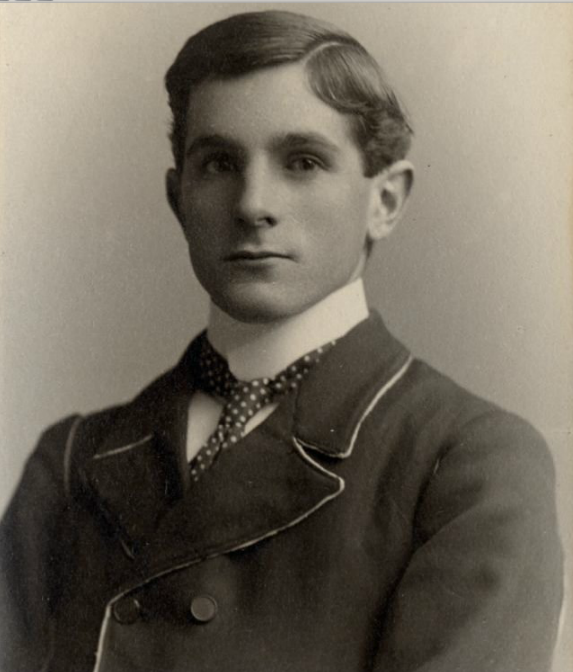
- Marcoux after graduating from the Séminaire de Québec, c.1905

Member of the Legislative Assembly of Quebec for Québec-Comté
- In office 1936–1939
- Preceded by: Francis Byrne
- Succeeded by: François-Xavier Bouchard

Personal details
- Born: October 29, 1884 Beauport, Quebec
- Died: September 10, 1951 (aged 66) Beauport, Quebec
- Party: Union Nationale

Adolphe Marcoux (October 29, 1884 – September 10, 1951) was a physician and a nationalist politician in Quebec, Canada.

Born in Beauport, Quebec, Marcoux won a seat to the Legislative Assembly of Quebec as a Union Nationale candidate in the 1936 election in the district of Québec-Comté. In 1937, he and colleagues René Chaloult, Oscar Drouin, Joseph-Ernest Grégoire and Philippe Hamel left the Union Nationale. Marcoux did not run for re-election in the 1939 election.
