= Philippe Hamel =

Canadian politician

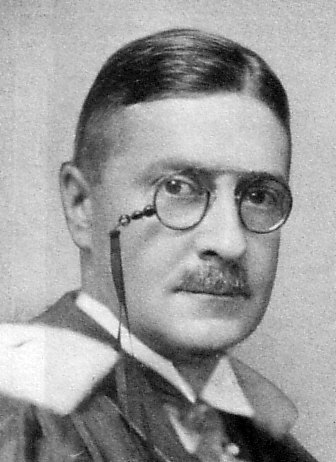

Member of the Legislative Assembly of Quebec for Québec-Centre
- In office 1935–1939
- Preceded by: Joseph-Octave Samson
- Succeeded by: Joseph-William Morin

Personal details
- Born: October 12, 1884 Quebec City, Quebec
- Died: January 22, 1954 (aged 69) Quebec City, Quebec
- Party: Action libérale nationale Union Nationale

Philippe Hamel (October 12, 1884 – January 22, 1954) was a nationalist and progressive politician in Quebec, Canada.

== Background ==
He was born on October 12, 1884, in Quebec City. His father was Charles-Antoine-Auguste and his mother was Sophie Vallieres. His father was a doctor of medicine at Université Laval and his mother's occupation is unknown.

== Member of the legislature ==
Hamel entered politics with the intention to achieve the nationalization of all privately owned electric companies. He first won a seat to the Legislative Assembly of Quebec as an Action libérale nationale candidate in the 1935 election in the district of Québec-Centre.

When his party merged with the Conservative Party of Quebec to form the Union Nationale, Hamel became one of Maurice Duplessis's most important campaign leaders. He was returned to office in the 1936 election and the Union Nationale won the election.

== Excluded from the Cabinet ==
After he secured his job as Premier, Duplessis kept many of the more progressive and independent-minded members of his party on the backbench. Therefore, Hamel was offered no portfolio. By 1937, he and colleagues René Chaloult, Oscar Drouin, Joseph-Ernest Grégoire and Adolphe Marcoux had left the Union Nationale. Hamel did not run for re-election in the 1939 election.

== Death ==
He died on January 22, 1954, at the age of 69 years old.

== Legacy ==
Hamel's main objective did not take place while he was in office. However, the government of Adélard Godbout bought the Montreal Light Heat & Power Co., which became Hydro-Québec, in 1944. Furthermore, nearly all privately owned electric corporations were nationalized and merged to Hydro-Québec in 1962–63, under the premiership of Jean Lesage.
