= Léon Casgrain =

Canadian politician

The Honourable Léon Casgrain
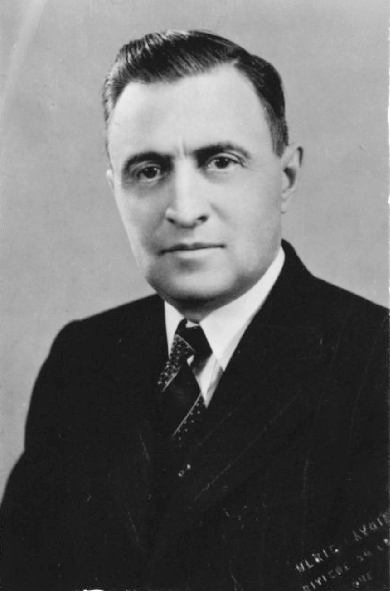

Member of the Legislative Assembly of Quebec for Témiscouata
- In office 1927–1931
- Preceded by: Jules Langlais
- Succeeded by: Joseph-Wilfrid Morel

Member of the Legislative Assembly of Quebec for Rivière-du-Loup
- In office 1931–1948
- Preceded by: District created in 1930
- Succeeded by: Roméo Gagné

Personal details
- Born: August 13, 1892 Rivière-Ouelle, Quebec
- Died: November 5, 1967 (aged 75) Rivière-du-Loup, Quebec
- Party: Liberal

Léon Casgrain (August 13, 1892 – November 5, 1967) was a Canadian politician and jurist from Quebec.

== Biography ==
He was born on August 13, 1892, in Rivière-Ouelle and was an attorney.

He ran as a Liberal candidate in 1927 for the district of Témiscouata and won. He was re-elected in the district of Rivière-du-Loup in 1931, 1935, 1936, 1939 (in Kamouraska–Rivière-du-Loup for that year only) and 1944. Casgrain was defeated in 1948 against Union Nationale candidate Roméo Gagné. He became Minister without Portfolio in 1939 and served as the province's Attorney General from 1942 to 1944.

In 1948, he was appointed a puisne judge of the Superior Court of Quebec, retiring in 1967.

Casgrain died on November 5, 1967, in Rivière-du-Loup, Quebec.
