= Oscar Drouin =

Canadian politician

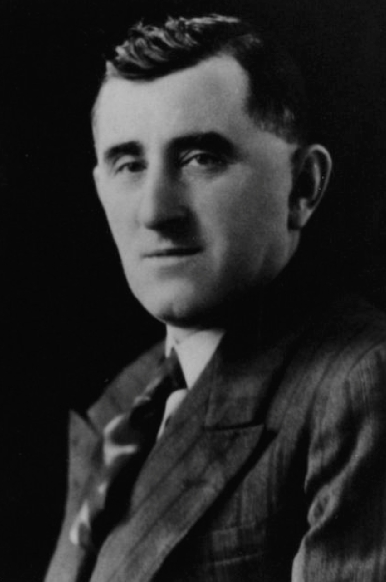

Member of the Legislative Assembly of Quebec for Québec-Est
- In office 1928–1944
- Preceded by: Louis-Alfred Létourneau
- Succeeded by: Henri-Paul Drouin

Personal details
- Born: September 29, 1890 Quebec City, Quebec
- Died: July 16, 1953 (aged 62) Quebec City, Quebec
- Party: Liberal; Action libérale nationale Union Nationale

Oscar Drouin (September 29, 1890 – July 16, 1953) was a politician in Quebec, Canada.

== Background ==
He was born on September 29, 1890, in Quebec City.

== Member of the legislature ==
Drouin won a by-election in 1928 and became the Liberal Member of the Legislative Assembly of Quebec for the district of Québec-Est. He was re-elected in the 1931 general election.

He joined the newly formed Action libérale nationale (ALN) in 1934 and was re-elected as a candidate of that party in the 1935 election.

After the ALN merged with the Conservative Party to form the Union Nationale, Drouin became Maurice Duplessis's campaign manager. He won re-election in the 1936 election and Duplessis became Premier.

== Mayoral candidate ==
Drouin was a mayoral candidate in Quebec City in 1934. He was defeated by Joseph-Ernest Grégoire.

== Member of the Cabinet ==
Drouin was appointed to the Cabinet. He became the Minister of Lands and Forests, but resigned in 1937. He and colleagues René Chaloult, Joseph-Ernest Grégoire, Philippe Hamel and Adolphe Marcoux left the Union Nationale. Drouin eventually switched Liberal and was re-elected in the 1939 election. He served as Minister of Municipal Affairs in Premier Adélard Godbout's Cabinet.

== Federal politics ==
Drouin did not run for re-election in the 1944 election. He was succeeded by his brother Henri-Paul. He ran as an Independent candidate in the federal district of Matapédia—Matane in the 1945 federal election, but lost.

== Death ==
Drouin died on July 16, 1953.
