= Québec-Comté (provincial electoral district) =

Quebec electoral district

Defunct provincial electoral district
- Legislature: National Assembly of Quebec
- District created: 1867
- District abolished: 1965
- First contested: 1867
- Last contested: 1962

Québec-Comté (or Quebec County) was a former provincial electoral district in the Capitale-Nationale region of Quebec, Canada. It was located in the general area of Quebec County, one of the historic counties of Quebec. It elected members to the Legislative Assembly of Quebec.

It was created for the 1867 election. Its final election was in 1962. It disappeared in the 1966 election and its successor electoral district was Chauveau.

== Members of the Legislative Assembly ==
- Pierre-Joseph-Olivier Chauveau, Conservative Party (1867–1873)
- Pierre Garneau, Conservative Party (1873–1878)
- David Alexander Ross, Liberal (1878–1881)
- Pierre Garneau, Conservative Party (1881–1886)
- Thomas Chase Casgrain, Conservative Party (1886–1890)
- Charles Fitzpatrick, Liberal (1890–1896)
- Némèse Garneau, Liberal (1897–1901)
- Cyril Fraser Delâge, Liberal (1901–1916)
- Aurèle Leclerc, Liberal (1916–1923)
- Ludger Bastien, Conservative Party (1924–1927)
- Joseph-Ephraim Bedard, Liberal (1927–1935)
- Francis Byrne, Liberal (1935–1936)
- Adolphe Marcoux, Union Nationale (1936–1939)
- François-Xavier Bouchard, Liberal (1939–1944)
- René Chaloult, Nationaliste - Independent (1944–1952)
- Jean-Jacques Bédard, Liberal (1952–1956)
- Émilien Rochette, Union Nationale (1956–1960)
- Jean-Jacques Bédard, Liberal (1960–1966)

== Election results ==
Quebec provincial by-election, October 31, 1901 Némèse Garneau appointed to the Legislative Council of Quebec
| Party | Candidate | Votes | % |
|---|---|---|---|
| Liberal | Cyrille-Fraser Delâge | 1,794 | 60.69 |
| Independent Liberal | C.-Eugène Dubour | 1,119 | 37.86 |
| Liberal | Narcisse Dion | 43 | 1.45 |
| Total valid votes | | 2,956 | 100.00 |

1904 Quebec general election
| Party | Candidate | Votes |
|---|---|---|
| Liberal | Cyrille-Fraser Delâge | Acclaimed |

1908 Quebec general election
| Party | Candidate | Votes | % |
|---|---|---|---|
| Liberal | Cyrille-Fraser Delâge | 2,450 | 64.59 |
| Conservative | Joseph-Ed. Bédard | 1,343 | 35.41 |
| Total valid votes | | 3,793 | 100.00 |

1912 Quebec general election
| Party | Candidate | Votes | % | ±% |
|---|---|---|---|---|
| Liberal | Cyrille-Fraser Delâge | 2,529 | 52.19 | -12.41 |
| Conservative | Alleyn Taschereau | 2,317 | 47.81 | +12.41 |
| Total valid votes | | 4,846 | 100.00 | |
| Liberal hold | | Swing | | -12.41 |

1916 Quebec general election
| Party | Candidate | Votes | % | ±% |
|---|---|---|---|---|
| Liberal | Aurèle Leclerc | 2,378 | 76.36 | +24.18 |
| Conservative | Alfred Martineau | 736 | 23.64 | -24.18 |
| Total valid votes | | 3,114 | 100.00 | |
| Liberal hold | | Swing | | +24.18 |

1919 Quebec general election
| Party | Candidate | Votes |
|---|---|---|
| Liberal | Aurèle Leclerc | Acclaimed |

1923 Quebec general election
| Party | Candidate | Votes |
|---|---|---|
| Liberal | Aurèle Leclerc | Acclaimed |

Quebec provincial by-election, November 5, 1924 Aurèle Leclerc named Joint Registrar of Quebec
| Party | Candidate | Votes | % |
|---|---|---|---|
| Conservative | Ludger Bastien | 2,618 | 51.25 |
| Liberal | Joseph-Éphraim Bédard | 2,490 | 48.75 |
| Total valid votes | | 5,108 | 100.00 |
Date source: Montreal Gazette, November 6, 1924, pg 1

1927 Quebec general election
| Party | Candidate | Votes | % | ±% |
|---|---|---|---|---|
| Liberal | Joseph-Éphraim Bédard | 3,081 | 53.19 | +4.45 |
| Conservative | Ludger Bastien | 2,711 | 46.81 | -4.45 |
| Total valid votes | | 5,792 | 100.00 | |
| Liberal hold | | Swing | | +4.45 |

1931 Quebec general election
| Party | Candidate | Votes | % | ±% |
|---|---|---|---|---|
| Liberal | Joseph-Éphraim Bédard | 3,747 | 54.66 | +1.47 |
| Conservative | Ludger Bastien | 3,108 | 45.34 | -1.47 |
| Total valid votes | | 6,855 | 100.00 | |
| Liberal hold | | Swing | | +1.47 |

1935 Quebec general election
| Party | Candidate | Votes | % | ±% |
|---|---|---|---|---|
| Liberal | Francis Byrne | 3,987 | 48.07 | -6.69 |
| Action libérale nationale | Joseph-Oliva-Horace Philippon | 3,753 | 45.25 | |
| Independent Liberal | Joseph-Albert Auclair | 554 | 6.68 | |
| Total valid votes | | 8,294 | 100.00 | |
| Liberal hold | | Swing | | -25.92 |

1936 Quebec general election
| Party | Candidate | Votes | % | ±% |
|---|---|---|---|---|
| Union Nationale | Adolphe Marcoux | 4,651 | 56.15 | +10.90 |
| Liberal | Francis Byrne | 3,632 | 43.85 | -4.22 |
| Total valid votes | | 8,283 | 100.00 | |
| Union Nationale gain from Liberal | | Swing | | +7.56 |

^ UN change is compared to ALN.

1939 Quebec general election
| Party | Candidate | Votes | % | ±% |
|---|---|---|---|---|
| Liberal | François-Xavier Bouchard | 3,539 | 47.17 | +3,32 |
| Union Nationale | Émile Delâge | 2,663 | 35.49 | -20.66 |
| Action libérale nationale | J.-Arthur Dion | 1,052 | 14.02 | |
| Liberal | Albert Chrétien | 249 | 3.32 | |
| Total valid votes | | 7,503 | 100.00 | |
| Liberal gain from Union Nationale | | Swing | | +11.99 |

1944 Quebec general election
| Party | Candidate | Votes | % | ±% |
|---|---|---|---|---|
| Independent | René Chaloult | 6,587 | 34.79 | |
| Liberal | Joseph Pagé | 6,224 | 32.88 | -14.29 |
| Union Nationale | Ludger Bastien | 6,120 | 32.33 | -3.16 |
| Total valid votes | | 18,931 | 100.00 | |
| Independent gain from Liberal | | Swing | | +24.54 |

1948 Quebec general election
| Party | Candidate | Votes | % | ±% |
|---|---|---|---|---|
| Independent | René Chaloult | 11,807 | 49.49 | +14.70 |
| Liberal | Joseph-Oliva-Horace Philippon | 7,546 | 31.63 | -1.25 |
| Social Credit | J.-Adélard Bélair | 4,503 | 18.88 | |
| Total valid votes | | 23,856 | 100.00 | |
| Independent hold | | Swing | | +7.97 |

1952 Quebec general election
| Party | Candidate | Votes | % | ±% |
|---|---|---|---|---|
| Liberal | Jean-Jacques Bédard | 11,230 | 39.67 | +8.04 |
| National | René Chaloult | 9,734 | 34.39 | -15.11 |
| Independent Union Nationale | Léopold Larochelle | 7,344 | 25.94 | |
| Total valid votes | | 28,308 | 100.00 | |
| Liberal gain from Independent | | Swing | | +11.57 |

1956 Quebec general election
| Party | Candidate | Votes | % | ±% |
|---|---|---|---|---|
| Union Nationale | Émilien Rochette | 21,272 | 56.22 | |
| Liberal | Jean-Jacques Bédard | 16,225 | 42.88 | +3.21 |
| Independent Union Nationale | Lorenzo Alain | 280 | 0.74 | |
| Labor–Progressive | Georges Boisvert | 63 | 0.17 | |
| Total valid votes | | 37,840 | 100.00 | |
| Union Nationale gain from Liberal | | Swing | | +26.50 |

1960 Quebec general election
| Party | Candidate | Votes | % | ±% |
|---|---|---|---|---|
| Liberal | Jean-Jacques Bédard | 27,839 | 55.95 | +13.07 |
| Union Nationale | Émilien Rochette | 20,686 | 41.57 | -14.64 |
| Independent | Léopold Larochelle | 1,232 | 2.48 | |
| Total valid votes | | 49,757 | 100.00 | |
| Liberal gain from Union Nationale | | Swing | | +13.86 |

1962 Quebec general election
| Party | Candidate | Votes | % | ±% |
|---|---|---|---|---|
| Liberal | Jean-Jacques Bédard | 34,090 | 57.80 | +1.85 |
| Union Nationale | Gaston Tremblay | 24,894 | 42.20 | +0.63 |
| Total valid votes | | 58,894 | 100.00 | |
| Liberal hold | | Swing | | +0.61 |
