= Ralph Frederick Stockwell =

Canadian lawyer and politician (1885–1962)

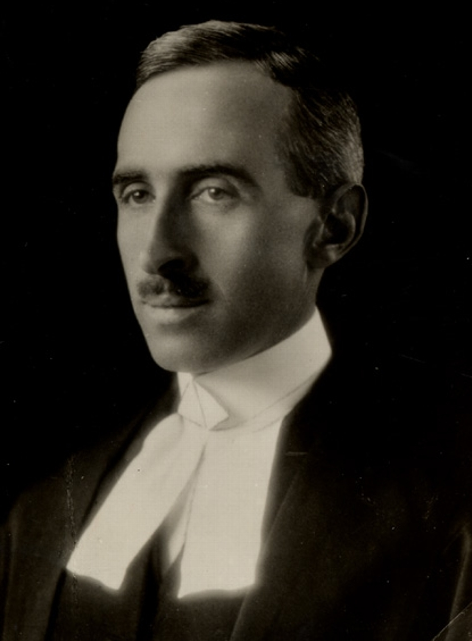

Ralph Frederick Stockwell, QC (21 November 1885 – 17 October 1962) was a Canadian lawyer and politician. He was provincial treasurer of Quebec from 1932 to 1936 in the government of Louis-Alexandre Taschereau.
