= Laurent Barré =

Canadian politician

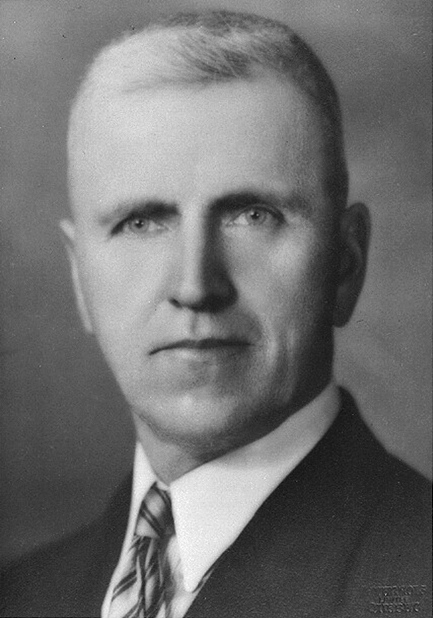
- Barré, c. 1944

Member of the Legislative Assembly of Quebec for Rouville
- In office 1931–1939
- Preceded by: Cyril-Améric Bernard
- Succeeded by: Henri-Pascal Panet
- In office 1944–1960
- Preceded by: Henri-Pascal Panet
- Succeeded by: François Boulais

Personal details
- Born: May 30, 1886 Ange-Gardien, Quebec, Canada
- Died: August 26, 1964 (aged 78) Granby, Quebec, Canada
- Party: Union Nationale

Laurent Barré (May 30, 1886 – August 26, 1964) was a Quebec author, politician and Cabinet Minister for 16 years.

He was born in Ange-Gardien, near Granby, Quebec, the son of Louis Barré and Arzélias Préfontaine. Barré worked as a blacksmith and a farmer until 1943. He was the founder of a catholic farmer's union in the 1920s and worked for several other farmer's organizations in the Granby and Yamaska regions.

He was first elected in Rouville in the Legislative Assembly of Quebec in 1931 as a member of the Quebec Conservative Party after a first unsuccessful attempt in the 1927 elections. He remained as MLA until 1939 as a member of the Union Nationale starting in 1935. He returned to office in 1944 and was re-elected for five more terms, although shortly after his re-election in 1960 and the loss of the Union Nationale to the Quebec Liberal Party, he resigned from his seat. He served as Maurice Duplessis' Minister of Agriculture from 1944 to 1960.

He also published two books entitled Bertha et Rosette and Conscience de Croyants in 1929-1930.

== Books ==
- Bertha et Rosette (1929)
- Conscience de Croyants (1930)

Président fondateur de l'Union Catholique des cultivateurs (U.C.C.)
