= Joseph Cohen (politician) =

Canadian lawyer, academic, and politician

Member of the Legislative Assembly of Quebec for Montréal–Saint-Laurent
- In office 1927–1936
- Preceded by: Ernest Walter Sayer
- Succeeded by: Thomas Joseph Coonan

Personal details
- Born: August 12, 1891 Russayn, Russian Empire
- Died: September 24, 1973 (aged 82) Montreal, Quebec
- Party: Liberal
- Spouse: Bella Gross
- Occupation: Criminal lawyer and academic

Joseph Cohen, QC (August 12, 1891 – September 24, 1973) was a Canadian lawyer, academic, and politician.

Born in Russayn, Russian Empire, the son of Myer Cohen, a Jewish clergyman, and Rebecca Benyash, Cohen was with his family when it migrated to Canada in 1892, settling in Montreal, Quebec. He studied at the High School of Montreal, McGill University, and at the Université Laval in Quebec. He studied law under Samuel William Jacobs and was called to the Bar of Quebec in 1913. He was created a King's Counsel in 1926.

A criminal lawyer, he practiced in Montreal. He first ran for the Legislative Assembly of Quebec for Montréal–Saint-Laurent in 1923 but was defeated. He was elected in 1927 and re-elected in 1931 and 1935. In 1936, the election results were declared invalid and he did not run in the resulting by-election.

From 1952 to 1961, he was a professor of criminal law at McGill University. He died in Montreal in 1973 and was buried in Montreal in the cemetery of the Congregation Shaar Hashomayim.
