= Charles Delagrave =

Canadian politician

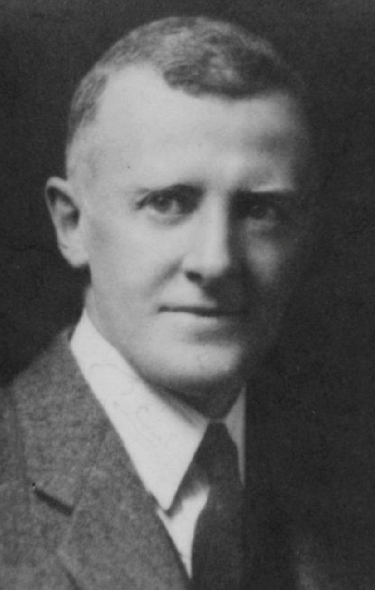

Member of the Legislative Assembly of Quebec for Québec-Ouest
- In office 1935–1944
- Preceded by: Joe Power
- Succeeded by: Wilfrid Samson

Member of the Legislative Council of Quebec for De la Durantaye
- In office 1944–1952
- Preceded by: Cyrille Vaillancourt
- Succeeded by: Joseph Boulanger

Personal details
- Born: 17 January 1881 Quebec City, Quebec
- Died: 25 August 1952 (aged 71) Quebec City, Quebec
- Party: Liberal
- Profession: Politician

Charles Delagrave (17 January 1881 – 25 August 1952) was a Canadian notary and politician.

Born in Quebec City, Quebec, Delagrave was educated at the Séminaire de Québec and the Université Laval before becoming a notary in 1903.

He was elected to the Legislative Assembly of Quebec for Québec-Ouest in 1935. A Liberal, he was re-elected in 1936 and 1939. He was appointed to the Legislative Council of Quebec for de La Durantaye in 1944. He served until his death in 1952.
