= Edgar Rochette =

Canadian politician

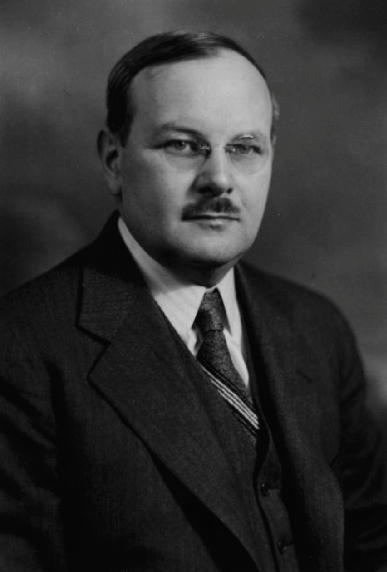

Member of the Legislative Assembly of Quebec for Charlevoix—Saguenay
- In office 1927–1936
- Preceded by: Philippe Dufour
- Succeeded by: Arthur Leclerc
- In office 1939–1944
- Preceded by: Arthur Leclerc
- Succeeded by: Arthur Leclerc

Personal details
- Born: April 28, 1890 La Malbaie, Quebec
- Died: June 15, 1953 (aged 63) Quebec City, Quebec
- Party: Liberal

Joseph Ulysse Edgar Rochette (April 28, 1890 – June 15, 1953) was a Canadian lawyer, judge, and provincial politician.

Born in La Malbaie, Quebec, Rochette was admitted to the Quebec Bar in 1914. A Rhodes Scholar, he studied law at Pembroke College, Oxford, from 1914 to 1917. He also spent time at the University of Grenoble.

He was a member of the Legislative Assembly of Quebec for Charlevoix—Saguenay from 1927 to 1936 and from 1939 to 1944. He held various cabinet positions including Minister of Labour, Minister of Labour, Games and Fisheries, and Minister of Mines and Fisheries. In 1944, he was made a judge.

Edgar Rochette was the author of Notes sur la Côte-Nord du Bas-Saint-Laurent et le Labrador canadien, published in Quebec City by Imprimerie Le Soleil (limitée) in February 1927. The 138-page manuscript reproduces notes from trips to the North Shore of the Lower St. Lawrence in July and August 1926.
