= Montréal-Dorion =

Quebec electoral district

Defunct provincial electoral district
- Legislature: National Assembly of Quebec
- District created: 1912
- District abolished: 1939
- First contested: 1912
- Last contested: 1936

Montréal-Dorion (French pronunciation: [mɔ̃ʁeal dɔʁjɔ̃]) was a former provincial electoral district in the Montreal region of Quebec, Canada that elected members to the Legislative Assembly of Quebec.

It was created for the 1912 election from part of Hochelaga electoral district. Its final election was in 1936. It disappeared in the 1939 election and its successor electoral districts were Montréal–Jeanne-Mance and Montréal-Mercier.

== Members of the Legislative Assembly ==
- Georges Mayrand, Liberal (1912–1919)
- Aurèle Lacombe, Parti ouvrier (1919–1923)
- Ernest Tétreau, Liberal Independent (1923–1927)
- Aldéric Blain, Conservative Party (1927–1931)
- Joseph-Achille Francoeur, Liberal (1931–1935)
- Grégoire Bélanger, Action liberale nationale – Union Nationale (1935–1939)
