= Montréal–Saint-Laurent =

Quebec electoral district

Defunct provincial electoral district
- Legislature: National Assembly of Quebec
- District created: 1912
- District abolished: 1939
- First contested: 1912
- Last contested: 1936

Montréal–Saint-Laurent was a provincial electoral district in the Montreal region of the province of Quebec, Canada.

It was created for the 1912 election from parts of Montréal division no. 4 and Montréal division no. 6 electoral districts. Its final election was in 1936. It disappeared in the 1939 election and its successor electoral districts were Montreal–Sainte-Anne and Montreal–Saint-Jacques.

== Members of the Legislative Assembly ==
- John Thomas Finnie, Liberal (1912–1918)
- Henry Miles, Liberal (1918–1923)
- Ernest Walter Sayer, Conservative (1923–1927)
- Joseph Cohen, Liberal (1927–1936)
- Thomas Joseph Coonan, Union Nationale (1936–1939)

== Bibliography ==
- Election results (National Assembly)
- Election results (QuebecPolitique.com)
