= Cléophas Bastien =

Canadian politician

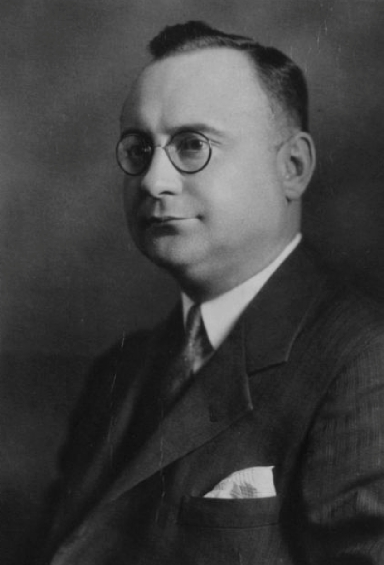

Member of the Legislative Assembly of Quebec for Berthier
- In office 1927–1943
- Preceded by: Amédée Sylvestre
- Succeeded by: Armand Sylvestre

Personal details
- Born: September 1, 1892 Saint-Gabriel-de-Brandon, Quebec
- Died: February 10, 1943 (aged 50) Quebec City, Quebec
- Party: Liberal

Cléophas Bastien (September 1, 1892 – February 10, 1943) was a Canadian provincial politician.

Born in Saint-Gabriel-de-Brandon, Quebec, Bastien was a member of the Legislative Assembly of Quebec for Berthier from 1927 until his death in 1943.
