= René Chaloult =

Canadian politician

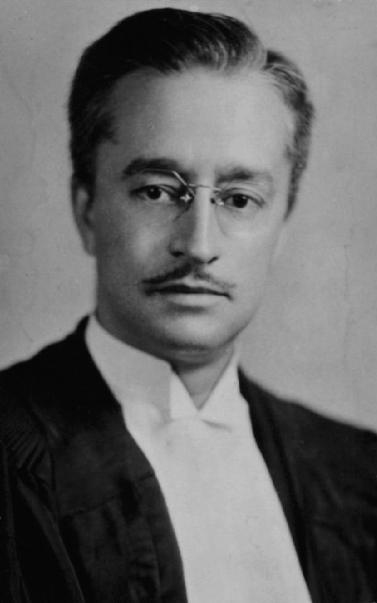

Member of the Legislative Assembly of Quebec for Kamouraska
- In office 1936–1939
- Preceded by: Pierre Gagnon
- Succeeded by: Louis Philippe Lizotte

Member of the Legislative Assembly of Quebec for Lotbinière
- In office 1939–1944
- Preceded by: Maurice Pelletier
- Succeeded by: Guy Roberge

Member of the Legislative Assembly of Quebec for Québec-Comté
- In office 1944–1952
- Preceded by: François-Xavier Bouchard
- Succeeded by: Jean-Jacques Bédard

Personal details
- Born: January 26, 1901 Quebec City, Quebec
- Died: December 20, 1978 (aged 77) Quebec City, Quebec

René Chaloult (January 26, 1901 – December 20, 1978) was a nationalist politician in Quebec, Canada. He is best known for submitting a motion for the Flag of Quebec.

== Background ==
He was born on January 26, 1901, in Quebec City.

== Political career ==
Chaloult first won a seat to the Legislative Assembly of Quebec as a Union Nationale candidate in the 1936 election in the district of Kamouraska. In 1937, he and colleagues Oscar Drouin, Joseph-Ernest Grégoire, Philippe Hamel and Adolphe Marcoux left the Union Nationale. Chaloult joined the Liberals and won re-election in the 1939 election as the Member for the district of Lotbinière.

During World War II, Chaloult opposed conscription.

He won re-election as an Independent in Québec-Comté electoral district in the 1944 and 1948 elections, but was defeated in the 1952 election and in the district of Jonquière-Kénogami in the 1956 election.

Chaloult retired to live at his summer home in Kamouraska. Each year on July 1, he would fly the Quebec flag outside his summer home at half-staff to show his nationalist inclinations.

== Death ==
He died on December 20, 1978.

== Legacy ==
For many years, Chaloult urged Quebec to adopt a distinctive design for its flag. On November 19, 1946, Chaloult entered a motion to provide Quebec with a unique flag. Two years later, the motion was to be voted on January 21, 1948. However, the opportunistic government of Maurice Duplessis instead issued a decree creating the current Quebec flag.
