= Abitibi (provincial electoral district) =

Coordinates: 47.70°N 78.30°W

Quebec electoral district

Defunct provincial electoral district
- Legislature: National Assembly of Quebec
- District created: 1922
- District abolished: 1944
- First contested: 1923
- Last contested: 1939

Abitibi (French pronunciation: [abitibi]) was a former provincial electoral district in Quebec, Canada which elected members to the Legislative Assembly of Quebec. It was located in the general area of the modern-day Abitibi-Témiscamingue region in Western Quebec.

It was created for the 1923 election from parts of the Témiscamingue electoral district. Its last election was in 1939. It disappeared in the 1944 election and was split into Abitibi-Ouest and Abitibi-Est.

== Members of the Legislative Assembly ==
- Joseph-Édouard Perrault, Liberal (1923)
- Hector Authier, Liberal (1923–1936)
- Émile Lesage, Union Nationale (1936–1939)
- Félix Allard, Liberal (1939–1944)
