= Montréal–Saint-Georges =

Quebec electoral district

Defunct provincial electoral district
- Legislature: National Assembly of Quebec
- District created: 1912
- District abolished: 1939
- First contested: 1912
- Last contested: 1936

Montréal–Saint-Georges (French pronunciation: [mɔ̃ʁeal sɛ̃ ʒɔʁʒ]) was a former provincial electoral district in the Montreal region of Quebec, Canada that elected members to the Legislative Assembly of Quebec.

It was created for the 1912 election from parts of Montréal division no. 5 and Montréal division no. 6 electoral districts. Its final election was in 1936. It disappeared in the 1939 election and its successor electoral district was Westmount.

== Members of the Legislative Assembly ==
- Charles Ernest Gault, Conservative (1912–1936)
- Gilbert Layton, Union Nationale (1936–1939)
