= Charlevoix—Saguenay (provincial electoral district) =

Former provincial electoral district in Quebec, Canada

Charlevoix-Saguenay
Quebec electoral district

Defunct provincial electoral district
- Legislature: National Assembly of Quebec
- District created: 1912
- District abolished: 1944
- First contested: 1912
- Last contested: 1944

Charlevoix-Saguenay (French pronunciation: [ʃaʁləvwa saɡnɛ]) was a former provincial electoral district in the province of Quebec, Canada.

It was created for the 1912 election from parts of the Charlevoix and Chicoutimi-Saguenay districts. Its final election was in 1944. It disappeared in the 1948 election and its successor electoral districts were Charlevoix and Saguenay.

== Members of the Legislative Assembly ==
- Pierre D'Auteuil, Conservative Party (1912–1919)
- Philippe Dufour, Liberal (1919–1927)
- Edgar Rochette, Liberal (1927–1936)
- Arthur Leclerc Union Nationale (1936–1939)
- Edgar Rochette, Liberal (1939–1944)
- Arthur Leclerc, Union Nationale (1944–1948)
