= Montréal–Sainte-Anne =

Quebec electoral district

Defunct provincial electoral district
- Legislature: National Assembly of Quebec
- District created: 1912
- District abolished: 1965
- First contested: 1912
- Last contested: 1962

Montréal–Sainte-Anne (French pronunciation: [mɔ̃ʁeal sɛ̃t an]) was a former provincial electoral district in the Montreal region of Quebec, Canada that elected members to the Legislative Assembly of Quebec.

It was created for the 1912 election from parts of Montréal division no. 5 and Montréal division no. 6 electoral districts. Its final election was in 1962. It disappeared in the 1966 election and its successor electoral district was Sainte-Anne.

== Members of the Legislative Assembly ==
- Denis Tansey, Conservative Party (1912–1919)
- Bernard-Augustin Conroy, Liberal (1919–1923)
- William James Hushion, Liberal (1923–1924)
- Joseph Henry Dillon, Liberal (1924–1935)
- Francis Lawrence Connors, Liberal (1935–1942)
- Thomas Guérin, Liberal (1942–1948)
- Francis Hanley, Independent (1948–1966)
