= Action libérale nationale =

National Liberal Action Action libérale nationale
- Leader: Paul Gouin
- Founded: June 6, 1934
- Dissolved: October 25, 1939
- Split from: Quebec Liberal Party
- Merged into: Union Nationale
- Ideology: Quebec nationalism Progressivism; Corporativism; Political Catholicism

The Action libérale nationale (French pronunciation: [aksjɔ̃ libeʁal nɑsjɔnal]; ALN; English: National Liberal Action) was a short-lived provincial political party in Quebec, Canada. It was founded during the Great Depression and led by Paul Gouin. The ALN played an important role in the foundation of the Union Nationale.

== Origin and beliefs ==
The party was created in 1934 by dissidents from the Liberal Party of Quebec. It soon received the support of French Canadian nationalists as federal Liberal Member of Parliament Édouard Lacroix, Liberal Members of the Legislature Oscar Drouin and Philippe Hamel, and Québec City mayor Joseph-Ernest Grégoire.

The ALN promoted social justice, nationalism and was not affiliated to any federal party. Its platform included the following proposals:

- Farm credit;
- Voluntary migration from cities to rural areas;
- Rural electrification;
- Nationalization of electricity;
- Corporatism;
- Electoral reform;

Its ideology was influenced by the social doctrine of the Catholic Church promoted by the priest Lionel Groulx, and the economical ideas of Esdras Minville.

== Electoral breakthrough ==
In order to unite the vote against the Liberal government of Alexandre Taschereau, the Action libérale nationale (ALN) and the Conservative Party of Quebec decided to run only one candidate of either party in each district for the 1935 Quebec election. With 29% of the vote, the ALN elected 26 out of 57 candidates; the Conservatives received 19% of the vote and won 16 seat out of 33 in which they ran a candidate.

== Decline ==
Less than a year later, Conservative Leader Maurice Duplessis, a rising star in provincial politics, tried to pressure ALN Leader Paul Gouin into merging both parties, but Gouin was not interested in the proposal. While Gouin subsequently cut ties with Duplessis and the Conservatives, 22 ALN MNAs (then called MLAs) joined the new party, known as Union Nationale, which won the 1936 Quebec election.

Gouin did not run for re-election to the legislature in 1936. ALN MNAs Vital Cliche, Wilfrid-Eldège Lauriault and Frederick Arthur Monk ran for re-election as Independents. None of them were elected. Cliche ran as an Action libérale nationale candidate in a by-election held on March 17, 1937, in his home district of Beauce. He was defeated.

The ALN opposed conscription and contested the 1939 Quebec election. Other than Gouin who took the leadership, the party was unable to attract any of its former candidates from the 1935 election. Instead René Chaloult and Oscar Drouin, who had grown disillusioned with Duplessis after they joined the Union Nationale, ran as Liberal candidates. The party won only 4.5% of the vote and none of its 56 candidates were elected. It disappeared soon after.

== Legacy ==
Even though the ALN did not survive the 1930s political realignment in Quebec politics, many of its policies were eventually implemented by the provincial governments of Maurice Duplessis, Adélard Godbout and Jean Lesage.

== Election results ==
| General election | # of candidates | # of seats won | % of popular vote |
| 1935 | 57 | 26 | 29.57% |
| 1936 | No candidates ran under the ALN label in 1936. |
| 1939 | 56 | 0 | 4.53% |

== See also ==
- Politics of Quebec
- Quebec general elections
- List of Quebec premiers
- List of Quebec leaders of the Opposition
- National Assembly of Quebec
- Timeline of Quebec history
- Political parties in Quebec
