= 1935 Quebec general election =

Canadian provincial election

- November 25, 1935

89 seats in the 19th Legislative Assembly of Quebec 45 seats were needed for a majority
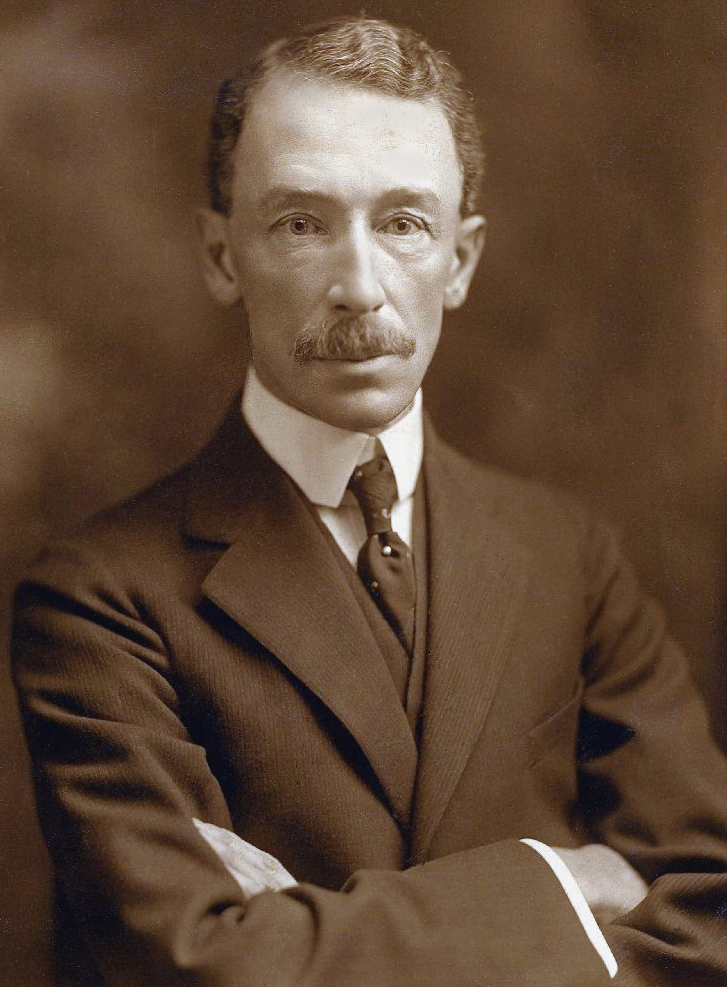

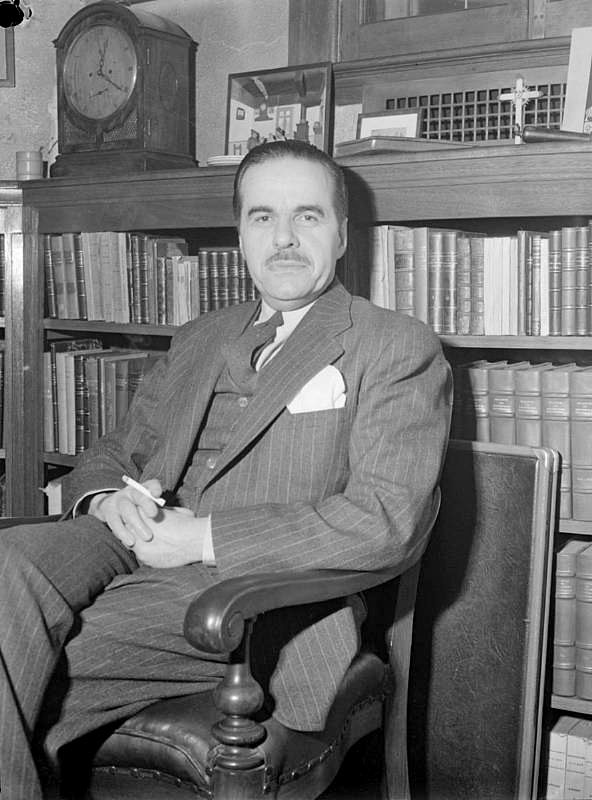

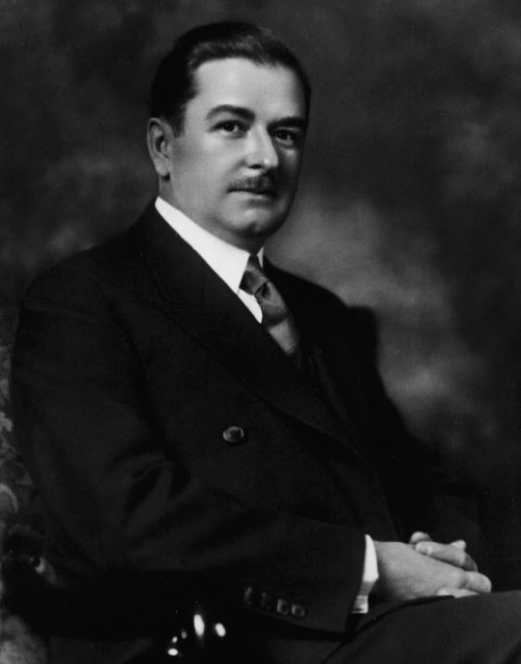
	First party	Second party	Third party
Leader	Louis-Alexandre Taschereau	Paul Gouin	Maurice Duplessis
Party	Liberal	Action libérale nationale	Conservative
Leader since	1920	1934	1933
Leader's seat	Montmorency	L'Assomption	Trois-Rivières
Last election	79 seats, 54.88%	pre-creation	11 seats, 43.54%
Seats won	47	25	17
Seat change	▼32	▲25	▲6
Percentage	46.53%	29.48%	18.93%
Swing	▼8.35pp	▲29.48pp	▼24.61pp
Premier before election
Louis-Alexandre Taschereau
Liberal
Premier after election
Louis-Alexandre Taschereau
Liberal

The 1935 Quebec general election was held on November 25, 1935, to elect members of the Legislative Assembly of the province of Quebec, Canada. The incumbent Quebec Liberal Party led by Louis-Alexandre Taschereau was re-elected, defeating the Action libérale nationale, led by Paul Gouin, and the Quebec Conservative Party, led by Maurice Duplessis.

It was the fourth and final general election victory in a row for Taschereau, who had held office since 1920. He resigned less than seven months later due to a scandal.

The Action libérale nationale (ALN) was a newly formed party led by the son of former Liberal premier Lomer Gouin. It was established by former Liberals who had become dissatisfied with the party. The ALN and Conservatives formed an alliance, the Union Nationale, to contest this election. They merged after the election to become a single party, which soon became a dominant political force.

This election was the last election until 2026 where seats would be won by a party under a Conservative party banner.

== Campaign ==
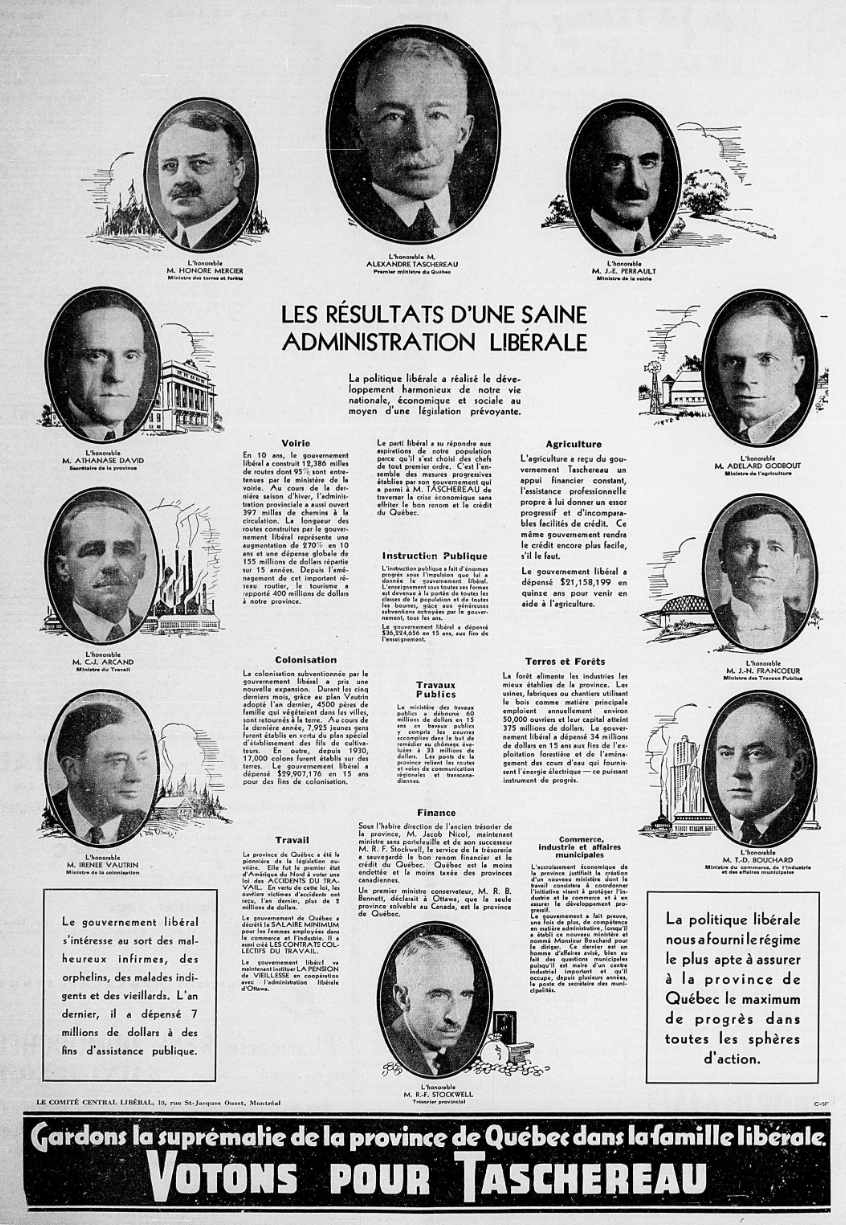
Political advertisement for the Quebec Liberal Party in the 1935 election

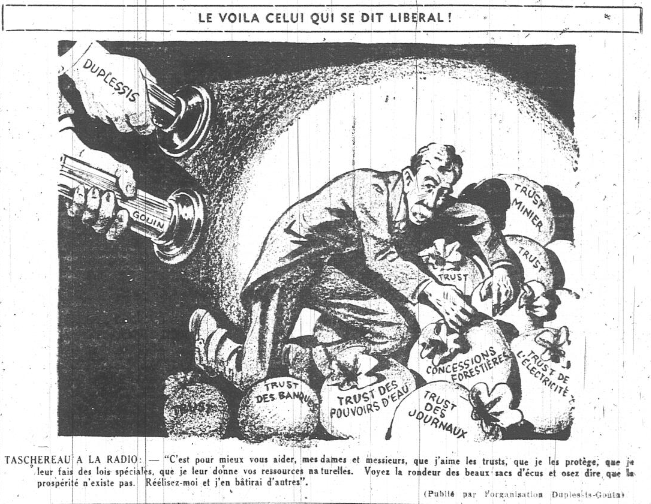
UN campaign illustration highlighting Taschereau's supposed views during election

=== Nominations ===
There were 208 candidates nominated, of which five subsequently withdrew:

- Wilfrid Bullock (Ind-Liberal, Shefford)
- Wilfrid Labelle (ALN, Iberville), thus allowing Lucien Lamoureux (Liberal) to be reelected by acclamation
- Roy Sasseville and René Mercier (Ind-Liberals, Gaspé-Nord)
- Arthur Arcand (Ind-Liberal, Montréal–Sainte-Marie), in favour of Gaspard Fauteux (Liberal)

All three candidates returned by acclamation were incumbents:

- Lucien Lamoureux (Lib, Iberville)
- Peter Bercovitch (Lib, Montréal–Saint-Louis)
- Avila Turcotte (Lib, Richelieu)

=== Distribution of candidates ===
Riding contests, by number of candidates (1935)
Candidates	Lib	Ind-G	ALN	Con	Ind-Lib	Ind-Con	Lib-Opp	Ind-Opp	Lab	Lib-Lab	Total
Acclaimed	3										3
2	64		40	23			1				128
3	19	2	11	8	14	1			1	1	57
4	4	1	3	1	5			1	1		16
Total	90	3	54	32	19	1	1	1	2	1	204

=== Controversy in Terrebonne ===
In Terrebonne, the election of Athanase David was contested on the ground that the ballot papers were not printed in the form prescribed under the Election Act. At the subsequent hearing, the judge ruled that all cast ballots were declared void. Immediately afterwards, the returning officer announced that, as this resulted in a 0–0 tie, he cast his deciding vote in favour of David.

Votes cast in Terrebonne (1935)
Candidate		Initial count	As determined by Returning Officer
Liberal	Athanase David	4,893	1
Conservative	Hermann Barrette	4,170	–
Majority		720	1

The returning officer's action was considered to have been without precedent anywhere in the world in countries with parliamentary-style legislatures. The Conservatives lodged an appeal, but the result was upheld by the Quebec Court of Appeal in April 1936. David would become the only member of the Assembly in Quebec history to be elected on only one cast vote.

== Results ==
Elections to the Legislative Assembly of Quebec (1935)
Political party	Party leader	MLAs				Votes			
Political party	Party leader	Candidates	1931	1935	±	#	±	%	± (pp)
Government candidates									
█ Liberal	Louis-Alexandre Taschereau	90	79	47	5▲	249,586	19,146▼	46.53	8.35▼
█ Independent	–	3	–	–	–	615	2,172▼	0.11	0.46▼
Union Nationale alliance									
█ Action libérale nationale	Paul Gouin	53	–	26	26▲	162,205	New	30.24	New
█ Conservative	Maurice Duplessis	33	11	16	5▲	97,469	115,754▼	18.17	25.37▼
Opposition candidates									
█ Liberal	–	1	–	–	–	1,532	New	0.29	New
█ Independent	–	1	–	–	–	94	12▼	0.02	–
Other candidates									
█ Independent-Liberal	–	19	–	1	1▲	21,587	20,522▲	4.02	3.80▲
█ Labour	–	2	–	–	–	2,238	1,757▲	0.42	0.32▲
█ Liberal–Labour	–	1	–	–	–	998	New	0.19	New
█ Independent-Conservative	–	1	–	–	–	37	547▼	–	0.12▼
Total		204	90			536,361		100%	
Rejected ballots						15,232	11,042▲		
Voter turnout						551,593	57,708▲	76.16	0.85▼
Registered electors (contested ridings only)						724,260	82,936▲		
Candidates returned by acclamation				3	3▲				

Popular vote
PLQ	46.53%
ALN	29.48%
PCQ	18.93%
Others	5.06%

Seats summary
PLQ	52.81%
ALN	28.09%
PCQ	19.10%

=== Synopsis of results ===
Results by riding - 1935 Quebec general election
Riding	Winning party						Turnout (Note: including spoilt ballots)	Votes (Note: Affiliations without candidates gaining 1st or 2nd place results provincewide, or otherwise not receiving more than 1% of the total vote, are grouped under "I-Oth" or "Other")							
Name	1931	Party	Votes	Share	Margin #	Margin %	Turnout	Lib	ALN	Con	I-Lib	Lib-O	Lab	Other	Total
Abitibi	Lib	Lib	6,088	55.78%	1,261	11.55%	80.85%	6,088	–	4,827	–	–	–	–	10,915
Argenteuil	Lib	Lib	2,412	51.31%	123	2.62%	77.61%	2,412	2,289	–	–	–	–	–	4,701
Arthabaska	Lib	Lib	4,143	69.36%	2,313	38.72%	84.12%	4,143	–	1,830	–	–	–	–	5,973
Bagot	Lib	Lib	2,386	57.98%	657	15.97%	89.06%	2,386	1,729	–	–	–	–	–	4,115
Beauce	Lib	ALN	6,862	80.41%	5,190	60.82%	83.45%	1,672	6,862	–	–	–	–	–	8,534
Beauharnois	Lib	Con	2,706	53.38%	343	6.77%	82.16%	2,363	–	2,706	–	–	–	–	5,069
Bellechasse	Lib	Lib	2,483	54.08%	375	8.17%	83.22%	2,483	2,108	–	–	–	–	–	4,591
Berthier	Lib	Lib	2,897	58.77%	865	17.55%	91.58%	2,897	2,032	–	–	–	–	–	4,929
Bonaventure	Lib	Lib	4,507	62.56%	1,810	25.12%	81.86%	4,507	2,697	–	–	–	–	–	7,204
Brome	Lib	Lib	1,999	57.28%	508	14.56%	82.19%	1,999	–	1,491	–	–	–	–	3,490
Chambly	Con	Lib	3,023	54.95%	545	9.91%	71.87%	3,023	–	2,478	–	–	–	–	5,501
Champlain	Lib	ALN	3,257	56.20%	719	12.41%	76.09%	2,538	3,257	–	–	–	–	–	5,795
Charlevoix—Saguenay	Lib	Lib	5,220	65.57%	2,479	31.14%	76.76%	5,220	2,741	–	–	–	–	–	7,961
Châteauguay	Lib	Lib	1,967	58.04%	545	16.08%	86.26%	1,967	1,422	–	–	–	–	–	3,389
Chicoutimi	Lib	ALN	7,484	72.60%	4,659	45.19%	76.25%	2,825	7,484	–	–	–	–	–	10,309
Compton	Lib	Con	2,803	52.27%	243	4.53%	83.19%	2,560	–	2,803	–	–	–	–	5,363
Deux-Montagnes	Con	Lib	1,848	50.19%	14	0.38%	92.53%	1,848	–	1,834	–	–	–	–	3,682
Dorchester	Lib	ALN	3,661	55.94%	777	11.87%	84.37%	2,884	3,661	–	–	–	–	–	6,545
Drummond	Lib	Lib	3,245	47.57%	20	0.29%	79.71%	3,245	–	3,225	351	–	–	–	6,821
Frontenac	Lib	ALN	3,310	62.19%	1,298	24.39%	84.57%	2,012	3,310	–	–	–	–	–	5,322
Gaspé-Nord	Lib	Lib	1,228	44.27%	96	3.46%	83.41%	1,228	414	–	1,132	–	–	–	2,774
Gaspé-Sud	Lib	Lib	3,019	50.42%	1,281	21.39%	86.10%	3,019	–	660	2,309	–	–	–	5,988
Gatineau	Lib	Lib	2,793	57.95%	766	15.89%	63.66%	2,793	2,027	–	–	–	–	–	4,820
Hull	Con	Lib	3,053	48.93%	795	12.74%	59.29%	3,053	–	2,258	928	–	–	–	6,239
Huntingdon	Con	Con	1,750	54.79%	306	9.58%	83.59%	1,444	–	1,750	–	–	–	–	3,194
Iberville	Lib	Lib	acclaimed (opponent withdrew)												
Îles-de-la-Madeleine	Lib	Lib	1,358	67.29%	963	47.72%	87.20%	1,358	395	–	265	–	–	–	2,018
Jacques-Cartier	Lib	ALN	4,909	56.84%	1,182	13.69%	73.16%	3,727	4,909	–	–	–	–	–	8,636
Joliette	Lib	Lib	3,484	53.32%	434	6.64%	86.80%	3,484	–	3,050	–	–	–	–	6,534
Kamouraska	Lib	Lib	2,918	57.27%	741	14.54%	83.99%	2,918	2,177	–	–	–	–	–	5,095
L'Assomption	Lib	ALN	1,969	50.80%	62	1.60%	89.29%	1,907	1,969	–	–	–	–	–	3,876
L'Islet	Lib	Lib	2,454	59.32%	771	18.64%	81.33%	2,454	1,683	–	–	–	–	–	4,137
Labelle	Lib	ALN	2,604	62.93%	1,070	25.86%	80.81%	1,534	2,604	–	–	–	–	–	4,138
Lac-Saint-Jean	Lib	Con	2,255	50.59%	53	1.19%	86.90%	2,202	–	2,255	–	–	–	–	4,457
Laval	Lib	Con	10,125	53.62%	2,412	12.77%	69.50%	7,713	–	10,125	1,044	–	–	–	18,882
Laviolette	Lib	ALN	3,497	61.00%	1,261	22.00%	72.64%	2,236	3,497	–	–	–	–	–	5,733
Lévis	Lib	ALN	3,346	42.33%	595	7.53%	86.19%	1,808	3,346	–	2,751	–	–	–	7,905
Lotbinière	Lib	Lib	4,088	80.58%	3,103	61.17%	77.67%	4,088	985	–	–	–	–	–	5,073
Maisonneuve	Lib	Con	9,408	56.34%	2,757	16.51%	65.26%	6,651	–	9,408	–	–	639	–	16,698
Maskinongé	Lib	Lib	2,319	64.20%	1,026	28.41%	78.04%	2,319	1,293	–	–	–	–	–	3,612
Matane	Lib	Lib	2,780	57.53%	728	15.07%	72.12%	2,780	2,052	–	–	–	–	–	4,832
Matapédia	Lib	Lib	2,809	50.86%	95	1.72%	86.71%	2,809	2,714	–	–	–	–	–	5,523
Mégantic	Lib	ALN	4,480	59.06%	1,375	18.13%	84.61%	3,105	4,480	–	–	–	–	–	7,585
Missisquoi	Lib	Con	2,686	53.23%	481	9.53%	83.64%	2,205	–	2,686	–	–	–	155	5,046
Montcalm	Lib	Lib	1,763	52.77%	185	5.54%	85.17%	1,763	–	1,578	–	–	–	–	3,341
Montmagny	Lib	ALN	2,340	52.51%	224	5.03%	83.87%	2,116	2,340	–	–	–	–	–	4,456
Montmorency	Lib	Lib	2,196	56.26%	489	12.53%	90.42%	2,196	1,707	–	–	–	–	–	3,903
Montréal-Dorion	Lib	ALN	4,979	56.17%	1,094	12.34%	66.99%	3,885	4,979	–	–	–	–	–	8,864
Montréal-Laurier	Lib	ALN	2,471	35.00%	872	12.35%	60.15%	1,594	2,471	–	1,397	–	1,599	–	7,061
Montréal-Mercier	Lib	Lib	9,071	50.05%	776	4.28%	71.30%	9,071	8,295	–	757	–	–	–	18,123
Montréal–Saint-Georges	Con	Con	1,414	55.54%	282	11.08%	49.90%	1,132	–	1,414	–	–	–	–	2,546
Montréal–Saint-Henri	Lib	ALN	2,418	35.03%	128	1.85%	67.09%	2,290	2,418	–	2,194	–	–	–	6,902
Montreal–Saint-Jacques	Lib	Con	3,036	50.38%	46	0.76%	72.49%	2,990	–	3,036	–	–	–	–	6,026
Montréal–Saint-Laurent (Note: The election of Joseph Cohen (Liberal) was later annulled on June 30, 1936, when he pleaded guilty to corrupt practices arising from stuffing ballot boxes, resulting in a turnout greater than 100% in several polling divisions. As the Assembly had already been dissolved, this had the effect of disqualifying him from standing in the following election.)	Lib	Lib	3,351	76.72%	2,334	53.43%	94.25%	3,351	–	1,017	–	–	–	–	4,368
Montréal–Saint-Louis	Lib	Lib	acclaimed (receiving officer not available to receive opponent's nomination papers)												
Montreal–Sainte-Anne	Lib	I-Lib	1,541	46.25%	550	16.51%	65.12%	991	716	–	1,541	–	–	84	3,332
Montréal–Sainte-Marie	Lib	ALN	4,782	49.92%	361	3.77%	66.11%	4,421	4,782	–	–	–	–	376	9,579
Montréal-Verdun	Con	Con	6,518	49.06%	3,017	22.71%	58.53%	3,501	–	6,518	3,268	–	–	–	13,287
Napierville-Laprairie	Lib	Lib	2,641	58.74%	1,158	25.76%	88.68%	2,641	1,483	–	372	–	–	–	4,496
Nicolet	Lib	Lib	3,427	54.41%	556	8.83%	79.82%	3,427	–	2,871	–	–	–	–	6,298
Papineau	Lib	ALN	4,075	56.72%	966	13.45%	73.11%	3,109	4,075	–	–	–	–	–	7,184
Pontiac	Lib	Lib	1,779	44.31%	62	1.54%	67.79%	1,779	1,717	–	519	–	–	–	4,015
Portneuf	Lib	ALN	4,502	56.32%	1,047	13.10%	84.49%	3,455	4,502	–	–	–	–	37	7,994
Québec-Centre	Lib	ALN	3,824	52.74%	398	5.49%	80.81%	3,426	3,824	–	–	–	–	–	7,250
Québec-Comté	Lib	Lib	3,987	48.07%	234	2.82%	91.36%	3,987	3,753	–	554	–	–	–	8,294
Québec-Est	Lib	ALN	5,629	57.61%	1,487	15.22%	84.13%	4,142	5,629	–	–	–	–	–	9,771
Québec-Ouest	Lib	Lib	1,894	58.44%	547	16.88%	81.71%	1,894	–	1,347	–	–	–	–	3,241
Richelieu	Lib	Lib	acclaimed (opponent withdrew)												
Richmond	Lib	Con	3,170	55.58%	637	11.17%	83.23%	2,533	–	3,170	–	–	–	–	5,703
Rimouski	Lib	Lib	3,055	53.49%	399	6.99%	79.54%	3,055	2,656	–	–	–	–	–	5,711
Rivière-du-Loup	Lib	Lib	3,866	59.26%	1,208	18.52%	84.53%	3,866	2,658	–	–	–	–	–	6,524
Roberval	Lib	ALN	3,768	60.56%	1,611	25.89%	81.59%	2,157	3,768	–	297	–	–	–	6,222
Rouville	Con	Con	1,938	53.08%	225	6.16%	87.16%	1,713	–	1,938	–	–	–	–	3,651
Saint-Hyacinthe	Lib	Lib	3,381	53.68%	463	7.35%	86.13%	3,381	2,918	–	–	–	–	–	6,299
Saint-Jean	Lib	Lib	2,626	63.16%	1,094	26.31%	79.55%	2,626	–	–	–	1,532	–	–	4,158
Saint-Maurice	Lib	ALN	4,219	59.72%	1,373	19.43%	82.05%	2,846	4,219	–	–	–	–	–	7,065
Saint-Sauveur	Con	Con	4,184	50.51%	1,082	13.06%	85.80%	3,102	–	4,184	–	–	–	998	8,284
Shefford	Lib	ALN	3,708	53.30%	459	6.60%	85.29%	3,249	3,708	–	–	–	–	–	6,957
Sherbrooke	Lib	ALN	4,777	60.68%	1,681	21.35%	75.06%	3,096	4,777	–	–	–	–	–	7,873
Soulanges	Lib	Lib	1,287	57.66%	342	15.32%	85.75%	1,287	–	945	–	–	–	–	2,232
Stanstead	Lib	ALN	2,871	52.98%	323	5.96%	77.22%	2,548	2,871	–	–	–	–	–	5,419
Témiscamingue	Lib	ALN	2,929	53.63%	1,343	24.59%	70.10%	1,586	2,929	–	853	–	–	94	5,462
Témiscouata	Lib	Lib	2,112	53.25%	258	6.51%	87.03%	2,112	1,854	–	–	–	–	–	3,966
Terrebonne	Lib	Lib	Returning officer cast sole ballot (all others declared void)												
Trois-Rivières	Con	Con	4,873	57.03%	1,202	14.07%	86.70%	3,671	–	4,873	–	–	–	–	8,544
Vaudreuil	Lib	Lib	1,120	37.35%	65	2.17%	84.65%	1,120	–	824	1,055	–	–	–	2,999
Verchères	Lib	Lib	2,077	64.50%	934	29.01%	90.87%	2,077	1,143	–	–	–	–	–	3,220
Westmount	Con	Con	8,288	55.75%	1,709	11.50%	46.39%	6,579	–	8,288	–	–	–	–	14,867
Wolfe	Lib	Lib	2,023	51.89%	147	3.77%	88.27%	2,023	1,876	–	–	–	–	–	3,899
Yamaska	Con	Con	2,080	52.39%	190	4.79%	91.93%	1,890	–	2,080	–	–	–	–	3,970

= open seat
= turnout is above provincial average
= winning candidate was in previous Legislature
= incumbent had switched allegiance
= not incumbent; was previously elected to the Legislature
= incumbency arose from byelection gain
= previously incumbent in another riding
= other incumbents renominated
= previously an MP in the House of Commons of Canada
= multiple candidates

=== Analysis ===
Party candidates in 2nd place (Note: excluding acclamations and Terrebonne result)
Party in 1st place	Party in 2nd place						Total
Party in 1st place	Lib	ALN	CON	Ind-Lib	Lib-Opp	Lab	Total
Liberal		26	13	3	1		43
Action libérale nationale	24			1		1	26
Conservative	16						16
Independent Liberal	1						1
Total	41	26	13	4	1	1	86

Candidates ranked 1st to 4th place, by party
Parties	Acclaimed	Declared	1st	2nd	3rd	4th	Total
█ Liberal	3	1	43	41	2		90
█ Action libérale nationale			26	26	2		54
█ Conservative			16	13	2		31
█ Independent Liberal			1	4	12	2	19
█ Labour				1	1		2
█ Liberal Opposition				1			1
█ Independent Government					2	1	3
█ Liberal–Labour					1		1
█ Independent Conservative					1		1
█ Independent Opposition						1	1

Resulting composition of the 19th Quebec Legislative Assembly
Source		Party				
Source		Lib	ALN	Con	Ind-Lib	Total
Seats retained	Incumbents returned	31		8		39
Seats retained	Incumbents returned - acclaimed and declared	4				4
Seats retained	Open seats held	9				9
Seats changing hands	Incumbents defeated - new MLAs	1	14	5		20
Seats changing hands	Incumbents defeated - previous members returned	1		1		2
Seats changing hands	Open seats gained	1	11	2	1	15
Seats changing hands	Incumbent changed allegiance		1			1
Total		47	26	16	1	90

== See also ==
- List of Quebec premiers
- Politics of Quebec
- Timeline of Quebec history
- List of Quebec political parties
- 19th Legislative Assembly of Quebec
