= 1939 Quebec general election =

Canadian provincial election

- October 25, 1939

86 seats in the 21st Legislative Assembly of Quebec 44 seats were needed for a majority
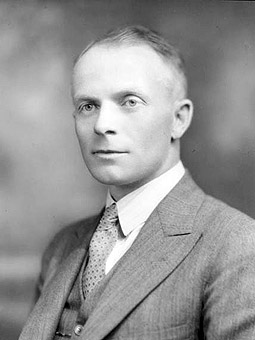

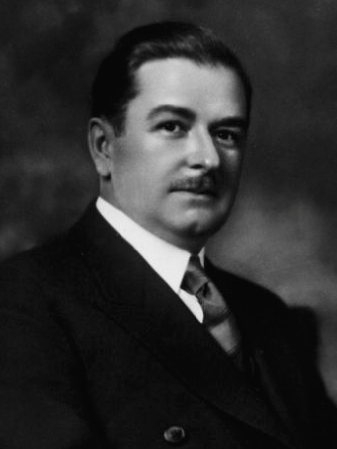
	First party	Second party
Leader	Adélard Godbout	Maurice Duplessis
Party	Liberal	Union Nationale
Leader since	June 11, 1936	June 20, 1936
Leader's seat	L'Islet	Trois-Rivières
Last election	14 seats, 39.41%	76 seats, 56.88%
Seats won	70	15
Seat change	▲56	▼61
Percentage	54.05%	39.13%
Swing	▲14.64pp	▼17.75pp
Premier before election
Maurice Duplessis
Union Nationale
Premier after election
Adélard Godbout
Liberal

The 1939 Quebec general election was held on October 25, 1939, to elect members of the Legislative Assembly of the province of Quebec, Canada. The Quebec Liberal Party, led by former premier Adélard Godbout, defeated the incumbent Union Nationale, led by Maurice Duplessis.

This was Godbout's second non-consecutive term of office and his only victory out of four consecutive general elections opposing Duplessis.

The Action libérale nationale, which had won 25 seats in the 1935 election and then merged with the Quebec Conservative Party, was re-formed by Paul Gouin, who had split with Duplessis soon after the formation of the Union Nationale. However the ALN obtained only 4.5% of the vote and no seats. It soon disbanded. Also, a rump Conservative Party ran three candidates who won 0.2% of the vote and no seats. This party also disbanded.

This was the last Quebec provincial election in which women didnt have the vote.

== Redistribution of ridings ==
An Act passed before the election reduced the number of MLAs from 90 to 86 through the following changes:

Abolished ridings	New ridings
Reorganization of ridings
Châteauguay; Napierville-Laprairie; Saint-Jean	Châteauguay-Laprairie; Saint-Jean–Napierville
Montreal–Sainte-Anne; Montreal–Saint-Jacques; Montréal–Saint-Laurent	Montreal–Sainte-Anne; Montreal–Saint-Jacques
Montréal–Saint-Georges; Westmount	Montréal–Notre-Dame-de-Grâce; Montréal-Outremont; Westmount–Saint-Georges
Montréal-Dorion; Montréal-Mercier	Montréal–Jeanne-Mance (Note: also absorbed part of Maisonneuve); Montréal-Mercier
Mergers of ridings
Kamouraska; Rivière-du-Loup	Kamouraska–Rivière-du-Loup
Richelieu; Verchères	Richelieu-Verchères
Soulanges; Vaudreuil	Vaudreuil-Soulanges

== Campaign ==
Riding contests, by number of candidates (1939)
Candidates	Lib	UN	Con	ALN	Nat	Ind	CCF	I-Con	I-Lib	I-ALN	I-UN	Lab	ALN-Lab	Comm	Total
Acclaimed	1														1
2	24	24	1		1										50
3	48	48		44		2					1		1		144
4	7	7		7		1	1	1	1		2	1			28
5	5	5		5		2		2	2	1		2		1	25
Total	85	84	1	56	1	5	1	3	3	1	3	3	1	1	248

== Results ==
Elections to the Legislative Assembly of Quebec (1939)
Political party	Party leader	MLAs				Votes			
Political party	Party leader	Candidates	1936	1939	±	#	±	%	± (pp)
Liberal	Adélard Godbout	85	14	69	55▲	301,382	77,008▲	53.50	14.09▲
Union Nationale and allies									
█ Union Nationale	Maurice Duplessis	84	76	14	62▼	217,413	106,399▼	38.60	18.28▼
█ Conservative (Note: Joseph-Philias Morin (Champlain) elected under Conservative banner but siding with the UN; joined UN caucus after election.)	–	1	–	1	1▲	2,989	New	0.53	New
Action libérale nationale	Paul Gouin	56	–	–	–	25,295	New	4.49	New
Parti national (Note: Formed during the 20th Legislature, when five MLAs broke from the UN. Only René Chaloult (Lotbinière) ran for re-election under the Nationalist ticket, and he declared himself as an Independent-Liberal after the election)	–	1	–	1	1▲	3,074	New	0.55	New
Other candidates									
█ Independent (Note: Camillien Houde was elected in Montréal–Sainte-Marie)	–	5	–	1	1▲	6,281	5,514▲	1.12	0.99▲
█ Co-operative Commonwealth	–	1	–	–	–	2,513	1,044▲	0.45	0.19▲
█ Conservative (Note: Candidates oppositing the UN)	–	3	–	–	–	1,679	191▼	0.30	0.03▼
█ Independent-Liberal	–	3	–	–	–	788	8,958▼	0.14	1.57▼
█ Independent-ALN	–	1	–	–	–	617	New	0.11	New
█ Independent-Unionist	–	3	–	–	–	469	1,459▼	0.08	0.26▼
█ Labour	–	3	–	–	–	410	331▲	0.07	0.06▲
█ ALN-Labour	–	1	–	–	–	228	New	0.04	New
█ Communist	–	1	–	–	–	159	886▼	0.03	0.15▼
█ Candidat du peuple	–	did not campaign							
Total		248	90	86		563,297		100%	
Rejected ballots						7,334	2,404▼		
Voter turnout						570,631	3,624▼	77.00	0.06▲
Registered electors (contested ridings only)						741,131	5,283▼		
Candidates returned by acclamation (Note: Edgar Rochette (Charlevoix—Saguenay), for the Liberals)				1	1▲				

=== Vote and seat summaries ===
Ternary plots - shift of electoral support (1936-1939)
1936

1939
Electoral districts identified by colours of winning parties

Popular vote
PLQ	54.05%
UN	39.13%
Others	6.82%

Seats summary
PLQ	81.40%
UN	17.44%
Others	1.16%

=== Synopsis of results ===
Results by riding - 1939 Quebec general election
Riding	Winning party						Turnout (Note: including spoilt ballots)	Votes (Note: Affiliations without candidates gaining 1st or 2nd place results provincewide, or otherwise not receiving more than 1% of the total vote, are grouped under "I-Oth" or "Other")										
Name	1936	Party	Votes	Share	Margin #	Margin %	Turnout	Lib	UN	Con-G	ALN	Nat	Ind	CCF	Con-O	I-Oth	Other	Total
Abitibi	UN	Lib	7,488	56.39%	3,020	22.74%	69.71%	7,488	4,468	–	396	–	–	–	–	927	–	13,279
Argenteuil	Lib	Lib	2,670	58.89%	954	21.04%	78.26%	2,670	1,716	–	148	–	–	–	–	–	–	4,534
Arthabaska	UN	Lib	3,448	56.53%	797	13.07%	86.40%	3,448	2,651	–	–	–	–	–	–	–	–	6,099
Bagot	Lib	Lib	2,183	52.14%	179	4.28%	89.51%	2,183	2,004	–	–	–	–	–	–	–	–	4,187
Beauce	UN	Lib	3,395	42.83%	135	1.70%	76.38%	3,395	3,260	–	1,272	–	–	–	–	–	–	7,927
Beauharnois	UN	UN	2,614	46.88%	102	1.83%	82.47%	2,512	2,614	–	450	–	–	–	–	–	–	5,576
Bellechasse	UN	Lib	2,515	53.25%	384	8.13%	83.88%	2,515	2,131	–	77	–	–	–	–	–	–	4,723
Berthier	Lib	Lib	2,664	54.01%	396	8.03%	88.65%	2,664	2,268	–	–	–	–	–	–	–	–	4,932
Bonaventure	UN	Lib	4,265	55.62%	862	11.24%	81.69%	4,265	3,403	–	–	–	–	–	–	–	–	7,668
Brome	UN	UN	1,795	53.52%	236	7.04%	82.33%	1,559	1,795	–	–	–	–	–	–	–	–	3,354
Chambly	UN	Lib	3,598	59.93%	1,603	26.70%	76.16%	3,598	1,995	–	209	–	–	–	202	–	–	6,004
Champlain	UN	Con	2,989	50.70%	83	1.41%	76.15%	2,906	–	2,989	–	–	–	–	–	–	–	5,895
Charlevoix—Saguenay (Note: Edgar Rochette had previously been MLA until 1936)	UN	Lib	acclaimed															
Châteauguay-Laprairie	New	Lib	3,049	52.26%	432	7.40%	84.71%	3,049	2,617	–	168	–	–	–	–	–	–	5,834
Chicoutimi	UN	UN	5,968	50.59%	1,537	13.03%	77.39%	4,431	5,968	–	1,398	–	–	–	–	–	–	11,797
Compton	UN	Lib	2,455	47.93%	287	5.60%	80.29%	2,455	2,168	–	499	–	–	–	–	–	–	5,122
Deux-Montagnes	UN	UN	1,930	53.26%	236	6.51%	84.35%	1,694	1,930	–	–	–	–	–	–	–	–	3,624
Dorchester	UN	UN	3,235	52.72%	597	9.73%	78.11%	2,638	3,235	–	263	–	–	–	–	–	–	6,136
Drummond	UN	Lib	3,950	53.81%	1,027	13.99%	80.26%	3,950	2,923	–	467	–	–	–	–	–	–	7,340
Frontenac	UN	Lib	2,242	44.00%	83	1.63%	78.81%	2,242	2,159	–	694	–	–	–	–	–	–	5,095
Gaspé-Nord	UN	Lib	1,548	52.44%	275	9.32%	82.49%	1,548	1,273	–	–	–	–	–	–	131	–	2,952
Gaspé-Sud	UN	UN	3,338	53.83%	475	7.66%	81.52%	2,863	3,338	–	–	–	–	–	–	–	–	6,201
Gatineau	UN	Lib	3,592	61.22%	1,317	22.45%	76.59%	3,592	2,275	–	–	–	–	–	–	–	–	5,867
Hull	UN	Lib	2,833	50.08%	237	4.19%	76.92%	2,833	2,596	–	–	–	–	–	–	–	228	5,657
Huntingdon	UN	Lib	1,729	58.14%	484	16.27%	81.95%	1,729	1,245	–	–	–	–	–	–	–	–	2,974
Iberville	Lib	Lib	1,146	47.26%	34	1.40%	87.61%	1,146	1,112	–	–	–	167	–	–	–	–	2,425
Îles-de-la-Madeleine	UN	UN	1,030	53.59%	138	7.18%	89.84%	892	1,030	–	–	–	–	–	–	–	–	1,922
Jacques-Cartier	UN	Lib	7,341	68.05%	3,895	36.11%	78.74%	7,341	3,446	–	–	–	–	–	–	–	–	10,787
Joliette	UN	UN	3,466	51.82%	243	3.63%	87.08%	3,223	3,466	–	–	–	–	–	–	–	–	6,689
Kamouraska–Rivière-du-Loup	New	Lib	6,691	58.67%	2,148	18.83%	81.46%	6,691	4,543	–	171	–	–	–	–	–	–	11,405
L'Assomption	UN	Lib	2,043	55.82%	633	17.30%	84.92%	2,043	1,410	–	207	–	–	–	–	–	–	3,660
L'Islet	UN	Lib	2,459	56.39%	566	12.98%	84.20%	2,459	1,893	–	9	–	–	–	–	–	–	4,361
Labelle	UN	UN	2,226	54.17%	343	8.35%	78.32%	1,883	2,226	–	–	–	–	–	–	–	–	4,109
Lac-Saint-Jean	UN	Lib	2,482	51.05%	135	2.78%	89.15%	2,482	2,347	–	33	–	–	–	–	–	–	4,862
Laval	UN	Lib	7,200	55.72%	2,226	17.23%	75.31%	7,200	4,974	–	748	–	–	–	–	–	–	12,922
Laviolette	UN	Lib	2,838	49.13%	339	5.87%	72.98%	2,838	2,499	–	439	–	–	–	–	–	–	5,776
Lévis	UN	Lib	4,342	56.03%	934	12.05%	85.60%	4,342	3,408	–	–	–	–	–	–	–	–	7,750
Lotbinière	UN	Nat	3,074	57.58%	2,265	42.42%	80.39%	–	2,265	–	–	3,074 (Note: René Chaloult was previously elected in Kamouraska under the UN banner)	–	–	–	–	–	5,339
Maisonneuve	UN	Lib	7,019	58.79%	2,685	22.49%	74.31%	7,019	4,334	–	586	–	–	–	–	–	–	11,939
Maskinongé	UN	Lib	2,155	57.76%	579	15.52%	80.76%	2,155	1,576	–	–	–	–	–	–	–	–	3,731
Matane	UN	UN	2,892	49.65%	10	0.17%	77.61%	2,882	2,892	–	51	–	–	–	–	–	–	5,825
Matapédia	UN	Lib	3,089	56.37%	840	15.33%	78.87%	3,089	2,249	–	142	–	–	–	–	–	–	5,480
Mégantic	UN	Lib	4,174	52.64%	418	5.27%	83.35%	4,174	3,756	–	–	–	–	–	–	–	–	7,930
Missisquoi	UN	Lib	2,334	49.60%	155	3.29%	79.40%	2,334	2,179	–	193	–	–	–	–	–	–	4,706
Montcalm	UN	Lib	1,654	47.49%	116	3.33%	87.12%	1,654	1,538	–	291	–	–	–	–	–	–	3,483
Montmagny	UN	Lib	2,326	53.63%	640	14.76%	76.14%	2,326	1,686	–	325	–	–	–	–	–	–	4,337
Montmorency	UN	Lib	1,960	50.91%	489	12.70%	87.21%	1,960	1,471	–	373	–	46	–	–	–	–	3,850
Montréal–Jeanne-Mance	New	Lib	6,978	60.01%	3,072	26.42%	71.43%	6,978	3,906	–	745	–	–	–	–	–	–	11,629
Montréal-Laurier	Lib	Lib	5,050	51.03%	1,028	10.39%	68.22%	5,050	4,022	–	824	–	–	–	–	–	–	9,896
Montréal-Mercier	UN	Lib	6,215	53.77%	2,431	21.03%	72.21%	6,215	3,784	–	1,524	–	–	–	–	35	–	11,558
Montréal–Notre-Dame-de-Grâce	New	Lib	6,827	74.95%	5,529	60.70%	62.16%	6,827	694	–	111	–	–	–	1,477 (Note: William Ross Bulloch (1,298 votes) was previously elected as the UN MLA in Westmount)	–	–	9,109
Montréal-Outremont	New	Lib	6,869	79.29%	5,368	61.96%	62.62%	6,869	1,501	–	293	–	–	–	–	–	–	8,663
Montréal–Saint-Henri	UN	Lib	6,261	64.28%	3,796	38.97%	67.73%	6,261	2,465	–	611	–	–	–	–	229	174	9,740
Montreal–Saint-Jacques	UN	Lib	3,810	52.84%	1,359	18.85%	66.87%	3,810	2,451	–	490	–	301	–	–	–	159	7,211
Montréal–Saint-Louis	Lib	Lib	5,084	64.92%	3,324	42.45%	63.09%	5,084	1,760	–	987	–	–	–	–	–	–	7,831
Montreal–Sainte-Anne	Lib	Lib	5,770	76.62%	4,206	55.85%	64.92%	5,770	1,564	–	197	–	–	–	–	–	–	7,531
Montréal–Sainte-Marie	UN	Ind	4,517	47.67%	1,997	21.07%	68.95%	2,520	2,002	–	330	–	4,517	–	–	–	107	9,476
Montréal-Verdun	UN	Lib	4,449	50.91%	1,936	22.15%	63.15%	4,449	1,415	–	362	–	–	2,513	–	–	–	8,739
Nicolet	UN	Lib	3,351	53.97%	825	13.29%	79.35%	3,351	2,526	–	332	–	–	–	–	–	–	6,209
Papineau	UN	UN	3,617	49.82%	704	9.70%	74.92%	2,913	3,617	–	730	–	–	–	–	–	–	7,260
Pontiac	Lib	Lib	1,998	50.85%	67	1.71%	65.21%	1,998	1,931	–	–	–	–	–	–	–	–	3,929
Portneuf	UN	Lib	3,759	48.45%	290	3.74%	80.53%	3,759	3,469	–	531	–	–	–	–	–	–	7,759
Québec-Centre	UN	Lib	4,296	59.05%	1,921	26.41%	76.86%	4,296	2,375	–	604	–	–	–	–	–	–	7,275
Québec-Comté	UN	Lib	3,539	47.17%	876	11.68%	86.24%	3,539	2,663	–	1,052	–	–	–	–	249	–	7,503
Québec-Est	UN	Lib	6,431	64.11%	2,831	28.22%	80.44%	6,431	3,600	–	–	–	–	–	–	–	–	10,031
Québec-Ouest	Lib	Lib	2,803	62.66%	1,366	30.54%	77.19%	2,803	1,437	–	233	–	–	–	–	–	–	4,473
Richelieu-Verchères	New	Lib	4,776	58.32%	2,137	26.09%	84.24%	4,776	2,639	–	775	–	–	–	–	–	–	8,190
Richmond	UN	Lib	2,998	52.55%	684	11.99%	82.92%	2,998	2,314	–	393	–	–	–	–	–	–	5,705
Rimouski	UN	Lib	3,584	54.63%	690	10.52%	83.28%	3,584	2,894	–	83	–	–	–	–	–	–	6,561
Roberval	UN	Lib	3,424	50.69%	589	8.72%	82.75%	3,424	2,835	–	496	–	–	–	–	–	–	6,755
Rouville	UN	Lib	1,761	50.01%	1	0.03%	81.83%	1,761	1,760	–	–	–	–	–	–	–	–	3,521
Saint-Hyacinthe	Lib	Lib	3,615	55.39%	703	10.77%	83.38%	3,615	2,912	–	–	–	–	–	–	–	–	6,527
Saint-Jean–Napierville	New	Lib	3,833	59.89%	1,309	20.45%	83.23%	3,833	2,524	–	43	–	–	–	–	–	–	6,400
Saint-Maurice	UN	Lib	3,462	46.54%	134	1.80%	80.23%	3,462	3,328	–	648	–	–	–	–	–	–	7,438
Saint-Sauveur	UN	Lib	4,972	56.56%	1,848	21.02%	85.59%	4,972	3,124	–	566	–	–	–	–	–	129	8,791
Shefford	UN	Lib	3,370	50.55%	598	8.97%	80.27%	3,370	2,772	–	525	–	–	–	–	–	–	6,667
Sherbrooke	UN	UN	3,914	46.90%	98	1.17%	75.23%	3,816	3,914	–	615	–	–	–	–	–	–	8,345
Stanstead	UN	Lib	2,846	50.18%	552	9.73%	76.83%	2,846	2,294	–	532	–	–	–	–	–	–	5,672
Témiscamingue	UN	Lib	4,760	56.52%	1,861	22.10%	65.61%	4,760	2,899	–	460	–	–	–	–	303	–	8,422
Témiscouata	UN	Lib	2,362	53.63%	373	8.47%	83.48%	2,362	1,989	–	53	–	–	–	–	–	–	4,404
Terrebonne	UN	Lib	4,891	53.17%	1,044	11.35%	83.15%	4,891	3,847	–	460	–	–	–	–	–	–	9,198
Trois-Rivières	UN	UN	5,278	59.69%	1,713	19.37%	87.91%	3,565	5,278	–	–	–	–	–	–	–	–	8,843
Vaudreuil-Soulanges	New	Lib	2,933	56.01%	710	13.56%	85.33%	2,933	2,223	–	81	–	–	–	–	–	–	5,237
Westmount–Saint-Georges	New	Lib	5,385	76.25%	4,135	58.55%	64.97%	5,385	427	–	–	–	1,250 (Note: Gilbert Layton was previously elected in Montréal–Saint-Georges under the UN banner)	–	–	–	–	7,062
Wolfe	UN	Lib	2,035	52.56%	198	5.11%	87.47%	2,035	1,837	–	–	–	–	–	–	–	–	3,872
Yamaska	UN	UN	2,089	54.97%	378	9.95%	87.32%	1,711	2,089	–	–	–	–	–	–	–	–	3,800

= open seat
= turnout is above provincial average
= winning candidate was in previous Legislature
= incumbent had switched allegiance
= not incumbent; was previously elected to the Legislature
= incumbency arose from byelection gain
= previously incumbent in another riding
= other incumbents renominated
= previously an MP in the House of Commons of Canada
= multiple candidates

=== Analysis ===
Party candidates in 2nd place
Party in 1st place	Party in 2nd place					Total
Party in 1st place	Lib	UN	Ind	CCF	I-Con	Total
Liberal		65	1	1	1	68
Union Nationale	14					14
Conservative	1					1
Nationalist		1				1
Independent	1					1
Total	16	66	1	1	1	85

Candidates ranked 1st to 5th place, by party
Parties	Acclaimed	1st	2nd	3rd	4th	5th	Total
█ Liberal	1	68	16				85
█ Union Nationale		14	66	4			84
█ Independent		1	1	1	2		5
█ Conservative		1					1
█ Nationalist		1					1
█ Independent Conservative			1		2		3
█ Co-operative Commonwealth			1				1
█ Action libérale nationale				52	3	1	56
█ Independent UN				1	2		3
█ Independent ALN				1			1
█ ALN-Lab				1			1
█ Independent Liberal					2	1	3
█ Labour					1	2	3
█ Communist						1	1

Resulting composition of the 21st Quebec Legislative Assembly
Source		Party					
Source		Lib	UN	Con	Nat	Ind	Total
Seats retained	Incumbents returned	6	14				20
Seats retained	Ouster of incumbent changing allegiance	1					1
Seats retained	Byelection loss reversed - previous incumbent returned	1					1
Seats retained	Byelection loss reversed - new MLA elected	1					1
Seats changing hands	Incumbents defeated - previous incumbent returned	10			1		11
Seats changing hands	Incumbents defeated - new MLAs elected	25				1	26
Seats changing hands	Open seats gained - previous incumbent returned	3					3
Seats changing hands	Open seats gained - new MLAs elected	9		1			10
Seats changing hands	Acclamation - previous incumbent returned	1					1
Seats changing hands	Incumbent changed allegiance	1					1
New ridings	Incumbent returned in new seat	3					3
New ridings	New MLA elected	6					6
Total		68	14	1	1	1	86

== See also ==
- List of Quebec premiers
- Politics of Quebec
- Timeline of Quebec history
- List of Quebec political parties
- 21st Legislative Assembly of Quebec
