= List of Quebec by-elections =

The list of Quebec by-elections includes every provincial by-election held in the Canadian province of Quebec since Confederation. By-elections occur whenever there is a vacancy in the National Assembly (known as the Legislative Assembly until 1968), although an imminent general election may allow the vacancy to remain until the dissolution of parliament.

== Causes ==
A by-election occurs whenever there is a vacancy in the Quebec legislature. Vacancies can occur for the following reasons:

- Death of a member.
- Resignation of a member.
- Voided results
- Expulsion from the legislature.
- Ineligibility to sit.
- Appointment to the Legislative Council, Quebec's appointed upper house, which was abolished in 1968.
- Appointment to the cabinet. Until 1927 incumbent members recontested their seats upon being appointed to Cabinet. These Ministerial by-elections were almost always uncontested.

== 43rd National Assembly of Quebec 2022–2026 ==
By-election	Date	Incumbent	Party	Winner	Party	Cause	Retained
Chicoutimi	February 23, 2026	Andrée Laforest	Coalition Avenir Québec	Marie-Karlynn Laflamme	Parti Québécois	Resigned to run for Mayor of Saguenay, defeated.	No
Arthabaska	August 11, 2025	Eric Lefebvre	Coalition Avenir Québec	Alex Boissonneault	Parti Québécois	Resigned to run federally in Richmond—Arthabaska, elected.	No
Terrebonne	March 17, 2025	Pierre Fitzgibbon	Coalition Avenir Québec	Catherine Gentilcore	Parti Québécois	Resignation	No
Jean-Talon	October 2, 2023	Joëlle Boutin	Coalition Avenir Québec	Pascal Paradis	Parti Québécois	Resignation	No
Saint-Henri—Sainte-Anne	March 13, 2023	Dominique Anglade	Liberal	Guillaume Cliche-Rivard	Québec solidaire	Resigned as Liberal leader and MNA.	No

== 42nd National Assembly of Quebec 2018–2022 ==
By-election	Date	Incumbent	Party	Winner	Party	Cause	Retained
Marie-Victorin	April 11, 2022	Catherine Fournier	Parti Québécois	Shirley Dorismond	Coalition Avenir Québec	Resigned to run for Mayor of Longueuil; elected.	No
Jean-Talon	December 2, 2019	Sébastien Proulx	Liberal	Joëlle Boutin	Coalition Avenir Québec	Resignation	No
Roberval	December 10, 2018	Philippe Couillard	Liberal	Nancy Guillemette	Coalition Avenir Québec	Resignation	No

== 41st National Assembly of Quebec 2014–2018 ==
By-election	Date	Incumbent	Party	Winner	Party	Cause	Retained
Louis-Hebert	October 2, 2017	Sam Hamad	Liberal	Geneviève Guilbault	Coalition Avenir Québec	Resignation	No
Gouin	May 29, 2017	Françoise David	Québec solidaire	Gabriel Nadeau-Dubois	Québec solidaire	Resignation	Yes
Arthabaska	December 5, 2016	Sylvie Roy	Coalition Avenir Québec	Éric Lefebvre	Coalition Avenir Québec	Death	Yes
Marie-Victorin	December 5, 2016	Bernard Drainville	Parti Québécois	Catherine Fournier	Parti Québécois	Resignation	Yes
Saint-Jérôme	December 5, 2016	Pierre Karl Péladeau	Parti Québécois	Marc Bourcier	Parti Québécois	Resignation	Yes
Verdun	December 5, 2016	Jacques Daoust	Liberal	Isabelle Melançon	Liberal	Resignation	Yes
Chicoutimi	April 11, 2016	Stéphane Bédard	Parti Québécois	Mireille Jean	Parti Québécois	Resignation	Yes
Beauce-Sud	November 9, 2015	Robert Dutil	Liberal	Paul Busque	Liberal	Resignation	Yes
Fabre	November 9, 2015	Gilles Ouimet	Liberal	Monique Sauvé	Liberal	Resignation	Yes
René-Lévesque	November 9, 2015	Marjolain Dufour	Parti Québécois	Martin Ouellet	Parti Québécois	Resignation	Yes
Saint-Henri–Sainte-Anne	November 9, 2015	Marguerite Blais	Liberal	Dominique Anglade	Liberal	Resignation	Yes
Chauveau	June 8, 2015	Gérard Deltell	Coalition Avenir Québec	Véronyque Tremblay	Liberal	Resignation to contest the 2015 federal election	No
Jean-Talon	June 8, 2015	Yves Bolduc	Liberal	Sébastien Proulx	Liberal	Resignation	Yes
Richelieu	March 9, 2015	Élaine Zakaïb	Parti Québécois	Sylvain Rochon	Parti Québécois	Resignation	Yes
Lévis	October 20, 2014	Christian Dubé	Coalition Avenir Québec	François Paradis	Coalition Avenir Québec	Resignation	Yes

== 40th National Assembly of Quebec 2012–2014 ==
By-election	Date	Incumbent	Party	Winner	Party	Cause	Retained
Viau	December 9, 2013	Emmanuel Dubourg	Liberal	David Heurtel	Liberal	Resignation to contest a federal by-election	Yes
Outremont	December 9, 2013	Raymond Bachand	Liberal	Philippe Couillard	Liberal	Resignation after losing leadership convention to Couillard.	Yes

== 39th National Assembly of Quebec 2008–2012 ==
By-election	Date	Incumbent	Party	Winner	Party	Cause	Retained
LaFontaine	June 11, 2012	Tony Tomassi	Independent*	Marc Tanguay	Liberal	Resignation	Yes/No
Argenteuil	June 11, 2012	David Whissell	Liberal	Roland Richer	Parti Québécois	Resignation	No
Bonaventure	December 5, 2011	Nathalie Normandeau	Liberal	Damien Arsenault	Liberal	Resignation	Yes
Kamouraska-Témiscouata	November 29, 2010	Claude Béchard	Liberal	André Simard	Parti Québécois	Resignation	No
Saint-Laurent	September 13, 2010	Jacques Dupuis	Liberal	Jean-Marc Fournier	Liberal	Resignation	Yes
Vachon	July 5, 2010	Camil Bouchard	Parti Québécois	Martine Ouellet	Parti Québécois	Resignation	Yes
Rousseau	September 21, 2009	François Legault	Parti Québécois	Nicolas Marceau	Parti Québécois	Resignation	Yes
Rivière-du-Loup	June 22, 2009	Mario Dumont	ADQ	Jean D'Amour	Liberal	Resignation	No
Marguerite-Bourgeoys	June 22, 2009	Monique Jérôme-Forget	Liberal	Clément Gignac	Liberal	Resignation	Yes

* Tomassi was a former Liberal

== 38th National Assembly of Quebec 2007–2008 ==
By-election	Date	Incumbent	Party	Winner	Party	Cause	Retained
Jean-Talon	September 29, 2008	Philippe Couillard	Liberal	Yves Bolduc	Liberal	Resignation	Yes
Pointe-aux-Trembles	May 12, 2008	André Boisclair	Parti Québécois	Nicole Léger	Parti Québécois	Resignation	Yes
Hull	May 12, 2008	Roch Cholette	Liberal	Maryse Gaudreault	Liberal	Resignation	Yes
Bourget	May 12, 2008	Diane Lemieux	Parti Québécois	Maka Kotto	Parti Québécois	Resignation	Yes
Charlevoix	September 24, 2007	Rosaire Bertrand	Parti Québécois	Pauline Marois	Parti Québécois	Resignation to provide a seat for Marois	Yes

== 37th National Assembly of Quebec 2003–2007 ==
By-election	Date	Incumbent	Party	Winner	Party	Cause	Retained
Taillon	August 14, 2006	Pauline Marois	Parti Québécois	Marie Malavoy	Parti Québécois	Resignation	Yes
Pointe-aux-Trembles	August 14, 2006	Nicole Léger	Parti Québécois	André Boisclair	Parti Québécois	Resignation	Yes
Sainte-Marie–Saint-Jacques	April 10, 2006	André Boulerice	Parti Québécois	Martin Lemay	Parti Québécois	Resignation	Yes
Verchères	December 12, 2005	Bernard Landry	Parti Québécois	Stéphane Bergeron	Parti Québécois	Resignation	Yes
Outremont	December 12, 2005	Yves Séguin	Liberal	Raymond Bachand	Liberal	Resignation	Yes
Vanier	September 20, 2004	Marc Bellemare	Liberal	Sylvain Légaré	ADQ	Resignation	No
Nelligan	September 20, 2004	Russell Williams	Liberal	Yolande James	Liberal	Resignation	Yes
Laurier-Dorion	September 20, 2004	Christos Sirros	Liberal	Elsie Lefebvre	Parti Québécois	Resignation	No
Gouin	September 20, 2004	André Boisclair	Parti Québécois	Nicolas Girard	Parti Québécois	Resignation	Yes

== 36th National Assembly of Quebec 1998–2003 ==
By-election	Date	Incumbent	Party	Winner	Party	Cause	Retained
Vimont	June 17, 2002	David Cliche	Parti Québécois	François Gaudreau	ADQ	Resignation	No
Lac-Saint-Jean	June 17, 2002	Jacques Brassard	Parti Québécois	Stéphan Tremblay	Parti Québécois	Resignation	Yes
Joliette	June 17, 2002	Guy Chevrette	Parti Québécois	Sylvie Lespérance	ADQ	Resignation	No
Berthier	June 17, 2002	Gilles Baril	Parti Québécois	Marie Grégoire	ADQ	Resignation	No
Viger	April 15, 2002	Cosmo Maciocia	Liberal	Anna Mancuso	Liberal	Resignation to enter municipal politics in Montreal	Yes
Saguenay	April 15, 2002	Gabriel-Yvan Gagnon	Parti Québécois	François Corriveau	ADQ	Resignation	No
Anjou	April 15, 2002	Jean-Sébastien Lamoureux	Liberal	Lise Thériault	Liberal	Resignation due to a vote buying scandal causing doubt on the validity of his election	Yes
Laviolette	October 1, 2001	Jean-Pierre Jolivet	Parti Québécois	Julie Boulet	Liberal	Resignation	No
Labelle	October 1, 2001	Jacques Léonard	Parti Québécois	Sylvain Pagé	Parti Québécois	Resignation	Yes
Jonquière	October 1, 2001	Lucien Bouchard	Parti Québécois	Françoise Gauthier	Liberal	Resignation	No
Blainville	October 1, 2001	Céline Signori	Parti Québécois	Richard Legendre	Parti Québécois	Appointed to the Quebec Municipal Commission	Yes
Mercier	April 9, 2001	Robert Perreault	Parti Québécois	Nathalie Rochefort	Liberal	Resignation	No

== 35th National Assembly of Quebec 1994–1998 ==
By-election	Date	Incumbent	Party	Winner	Party	Cause	Retained
Argenteuil	June 1, 1998	Régent L. Beaudet	Liberal	David Whissell	Liberal	Resignation	Yes
Kamouraska-Témiscouata	October 6, 1997	France Dionne	Liberal	Claude Béchard	Liberal	Resignation to contest the 1997 federal election	Yes
Duplessis	October 6, 1997	Denis Perron	Parti Québécois	Normand Duguay	Parti Québécois	Death	Yes
Bourassa	October 6, 1997	Yvon Charbonneau	Liberal	Michèle Lamquin-Éthier	Liberal	Resignation to contest the 1997 federal election	Yes
Bertrand	October 6, 1997	Robert Therien	Independent*	Denis Chalifoux	Liberal	Void Election	Yes/No
Prévost	April 28, 1997	Daniel Paillé	Parti Québécois	Lucie Papineau	Parti Québécois	Resignation	Yes
Beauce-Sud	April 28, 1997	Paul-Eugène Quirion	Liberal	Diane Leblanc	Liberal	Death	Yes
Pointe-aux-Trembles	December 9, 1996	Michel Bourdon	Parti Québécois	Nicole Léger	Parti Québécois	Resignation	Yes
Outremont	June 10, 1996	Gérald Tremblay	Liberal	Pierre-Étienne Laporte	Liberal	Resignation	Yes
L'Assomption	June 10, 1996	Jacques Parizeau	Parti Québécois	Jean-Claude St-André	Parti Québécois	Resignation	Yes
La Prairie	February 19, 1996	Denis Lazure	Parti Québécois	Monique Simard	Parti Québécois	Resignation	Yes
Jonquière	February 19, 1996	Francis Dufour	Parti Québécois	Lucien Bouchard	Parti Québécois	Resignation to provide a seat for Bouchard	Yes

*Therien was a former Liberal

== 34th National Assembly of Quebec 1989–1994 ==
By-election	Date	Incumbent	Party	Winner	Party	Cause	Retained
Shefford	February 28, 1994	Roger Paré	Parti Québécois	Bernard Brodeur	Liberal	Resignation	No
Bonaventure	February 21, 1994	Gérard D. Levesque	Liberal	Marcel Landry	Parti Québécois	Death	No
Laval-des-Rapides	December 13, 1993	Guy Bélanger	Liberal	Serge Ménard	Parti Québécois	Resignation	No
Portneuf	July 5, 1993	Michel Pagé	Liberal	Roger Bertrand	Parti Québécois	Resignation	No
Anjou	January 20, 1992	René Serge Larouche	Independent*	Pierre Bélanger	Parti Québécois	Resignation	No
Montmorency	August 12, 1991	Yves Séguin	Liberal	Jean Filion	Parti Québécois	Resignation	No

*Larouche was a former Liberal

== 33rd National Assembly of Quebec 1985–1989 ==
By-election	Date	Incumbent	Party	Winner	Party	Cause	Retained
Papineau	May 29, 1989	Mark Assad	Liberal	Norman MacMillan	Liberal	Resignation to contest the 1988 federal election	Yes
Hull	May 29, 1989	Gilles Rocheleau	Liberal	Robert LeSage	Liberal	Resignation to contest the 1988 federal election	Yes
Roberval	June 20, 1988	Michel Gauthier	Parti Québécois	Gaston Blackburn	Liberal	Resignation	No
Anjou	June 20, 1988	Pierre-Marc Johnson	Parti Québécois	René Serge Larouche	Liberal	Resignation	No
Notre-Dame-de-Grâce	September 14, 1987	Reed Scowen	Liberal	Harold Thuringer	Liberal	Resignation to become Delegate General	Yes
Saint-Laurent	January 20, 1986	Germain Leduc	Liberal	Robert Bourassa	Liberal	Resignation to provide a seat for Bourassa	Yes

== 32nd National Assembly of Quebec 1981–1985 ==
By-election	Date	Incumbent	Party	Winner	Party	Cause	Retained
Trois-Rivières	June 3, 1985	Denis Vaugeois	Parti Québécois	Paul Philibert	Liberal	Resignation	No
L'Assomption	June 3, 1985	Jacques Parizeau	Parti Québécois	Jean-Guy Gervais	Liberal	Resignation	No
Bourget	June 3, 1985	Camille Laurin	Parti Québécois	Claude Trudel	Liberal	Resignation	No
Bertrand	June 3, 1985	Denis Lazure	Parti Québécois	Robert Bourassa	Liberal	Resignation	No
Saint-Jacques	November 26, 1984	Serge Champagne	Liberal	Jean-François Viau	Liberal	Death (car accident)	Yes
Sauvé	June 18, 1984	Jacques-Yvan Morin	Parti Québécois	Marcel Parent	Liberal	Resignation	No
Marie-Victorin	June 18, 1984	Pierre Marois	Parti Québécois	Guy Pratt	Liberal	Resignation	No
Marguerite-Bourgeoys	June 18, 1984	Fernand Lalonde	Liberal	Gilles Fortin	Liberal	Resignation	Yes
Mégantic-Compton	December 5, 1983	Fabien Bélanger	Liberal	Madeleine Bélanger	Liberal	Death	Yes
Jonquière	December 5, 1983	Claude Vaillancourt	Parti Québécois	Aline Saint-Amand	Liberal	Appointed a judge	No
Saint-Jacques	June 20, 1983	Claude Charron	Parti Québécois	Serge Champagne	Liberal	Resignation	No
Saguenay	June 20, 1983	Lucien Lessard	Parti Québécois	Ghislain Maltais	Liberal	Resignation	No
Charlesbourg	June 20, 1983	Denis de Belleval	Parti Québécois	Marc-Yvan Côté	Liberal	Resignation	No
Saint-Laurent	April 5, 1982	Claude Forget	Liberal	Germain Leduc	Liberal	Resignation	Yes
Louis-Hébert	April 5, 1982	Claude Morin	Parti Québécois	Réjean Doyon	Liberal	Resignation	No

== 31st National Assembly of Quebec 1976–1981 ==
By-election	Date	Incumbent	Party	Winner	Party	Cause	Retained
Outremont	November 17, 1980	André Raynauld	Liberal	Pierre Fortier	Liberal	Resignation	Yes
Mégantic-Compton	November 17, 1980	Fernand Grenier	Union Nationale	Fabien Bélanger	Liberal	Resignation to contest the 1980 federal election	No
Johnson	November 17, 1980	Maurice Bellemare	Union Nationale	Camille Picard	Liberal	Resignation	No
Brome-Missisquoi	November 17, 1980	Armand Russell	Union Nationale	Pierre Paradis	Liberal	Resignation to contest the 1980 federal election	No
D'Arcy-McGee	November 26, 1979	Victor Goldbloom	Liberal	Herbert Marx	Liberal	Resignation to become head of the Canadian Council of Christians and Jews	Yes
Prévost	November 14, 1979	Jean-Guy Cardinal	Parti Québécois	Solange Chaput-Rolland	Liberal	Death	No
Maisonneuve	November 14, 1979	Robert Burns	Parti Québécois	Georges Lalande	Liberal	Resignation (health reasons)	No
Beauce-Sud	November 14, 1979	Fabien Roy	Parti national populaire	Hermann Mathieu	Liberal	Resignation to contest the 1979 federal election	No
Jean-Talon	April 30, 1979	Raymond Garneau	Liberal	Jean-Claude Rivest	Liberal	Resignation	Yes
Argenteuil	April 30, 1979	Zoël Saindon	Liberal	Claude Ryan	Liberal	Resignation to provide a seat for Ryan	Yes
Notre-Dame-de-Grâce	July 5, 1978	Bryce Mackasey	Liberal	Reed Scowen	Liberal	Resignation	Yes

== 30th National Assembly of Quebec 1973–1976 ==
By-election	Date	Incumbent	Party	Winner	Party	Cause	Retained
Johnson	August 28, 1974	Jean-Claude Boutin	Liberal	Maurice Bellemare	Union Nationale	Sought re-election due to charges of illegally acting as a Crown prosecutor	No

== 29th National Assembly of Quebec 1970–1973 ==
By-election	Date	Incumbent	Party	Winner	Party	Cause	Retained
Gatineau	November 15, 1972	Michel Gratton	Liberal	Michel Gratton	Liberal	Void Election	Yes
Gatineau	October 11, 1972	Roy Fournier	Liberal	Michel Gratton	Liberal	Appointed a judge	Yes
Duplessis	October 11, 1972	Henri-Laurier Coiteux	Liberal	Donald Gallienne	Liberal	Death	Yes
Chambly	February 8, 1971	Pierre Laporte	Liberal	Jean Cournoyer	Liberal	Death (murdered)	Yes

== 28th Legislative/National Assembly of Quebec 1966–1970 ==
Upon the abolition of the Legislative Council on December 31, 1968, the Legislative Assembly of Quebec is renamed the National Assembly of Quebec

By-election	Date	Incumbent	Party	Winner	Party	Cause	Retained
Vaudreuil-Soulanges	October 8, 1969	Paul Gérin-Lajoie	Liberal	Francis-Édouard Belliveau	Union Nationale	Resignation	No
Trois-Rivières	October 8, 1969	Yves Gabias	Union Nationale	Gilles Gauthier	Union Nationale	Appointed a judge	Yes
Saint-Jacques	October 8, 1969	Paul Dozois	Union Nationale	Jean Cournoyer	Union Nationale	Appointed to the Board of Hydro-Québec	Yes
Sainte-Marie	October 8, 1969	Edgar Charbonneau	Union Nationale	Jean-Jacques Croteau	Union Nationale	Resignation	Yes
Dorion	March 3, 1969	François Aquin	Independent*	Mario Beaulieu	Union Nationale	Resignation	No
Notre-Dame-de-Grâce	December 4, 1968	Eric Kierans	Liberal	William Tetley	Liberal	Resignation to contest the 1968 federal election	Yes
Bagot	December 4, 1968	Daniel Johnson	Union Nationale	Jean-Guy Cardinal	Union Nationale	Death	Yes

* Aquin was a former Liberal

== 27th Legislative Assembly of Quebec 1962–1966 ==
By-election	Date	Incumbent	Party	Winner	Party	Cause	Retained
Terrebonne	January 18, 1965	Lionel Bertrand	Liberal	Denis Hardy	Liberal	Appointed to the Legislative Council	Yes
Saint-Maurice	January 18, 1965	René Hamel	Liberal	Jean-Guy Trépanier	Liberal	Appointed a judge	Yes
Saguenay	October 5, 1964	Rodrigue Thibault	Liberal	Pierre-Willie Maltais	Liberal	Death	Yes
Montréal-Verdun	October 5, 1964	George O'Reilly	Liberal	Claude Wagner	Liberal	Appointed to the Legislative Council	Yes
Matane	October 5, 1964	Philippe Castonguay	Liberal	Jacques Bernier	Liberal	Death	Yes
Dorchester	October 5, 1964	Joseph-Armand Nadeau	Union Nationale	Francis O'Farrell	Liberal	Death	No
Montréal–Notre-Dame-de-Grâce	September 25, 1963	Paul Earl	Liberal	Eric Kierans	Liberal	Death	Yes

== 26th Legislative Assembly of Quebec 1960–1962 ==
By-election	Date	Incumbent	Party	Winner	Party	Cause	Retained
Jacques-Cartier	December 14, 1961	Charles-Aimé Kirkland	Liberal	Marie-Claire Kirkland	Liberal	Death	Yes
Chambly	December 14, 1961	Robert Théberge	Liberal	Pierre Laporte	Liberal	Death	Yes
Rouville	November 23, 1960	Laurent Barré	Union Nationale	François Boulais	Liberal	Resignation	No
Joliette	November 23, 1960	Antonio Barrette	Union Nationale	Gaston Lambert	Liberal	Resignation	No

== 25th Legislative Assembly of Quebec 1956–1960 ==
By-election	Date	Incumbent	Party	Winner	Party	Cause	Retained
Lac-Saint-Jean	September 16, 1959	Antonio Auger	Union Nationale	Jean-Paul Levasseur	Union Nationale	Appointed to the Legislative Council	Yes
Labelle	September 16, 1959	Pierre Bohémier	Union Nationale	Fernand Lafontaine	Union Nationale	Death	Yes
Roberval	October 15, 1958	Paul-Henri Spence	Union Nationale	Jean-Joseph Turcotte	Union Nationale	Resignation	Yes
Labelle	October 15, 1958†	Albiny Paquette	Union Nationale	Pierre Bohémier	Union Nationale	Appointed to the Legislative Council	Yes
Matane	July 2, 1958	Onésime Gagnon	Union Nationale	Benoît Gaboury	Union Nationale	Appointed Lieutenant Governor	Yes
Vaudreuil-Soulanges	September 18, 1957	Joseph-Édouard Jeannotte	Union Nationale	Loyola Schmidt	Union Nationale	Death	Yes
Mégantic	September 18, 1957	Tancrède Labbé	Union Nationale	Joseph-Émile Fortin	Union Nationale	Death (car accident)	Yes
Compton	September 18, 1957	Fabien Gagnon	Liberal	Claude-Gilles Gosselin	Union Nationale	Death	No
Châteauguay	September 18, 1957	Arthur Laberge	Union Nationale	Joseph-Maurice Laberge	Union Nationale	Death	Yes

† Won by acclamation

== 24th Legislative Assembly of Quebec 1952–1956 ==
By-election	Date	Incumbent	Party	Winner	Party	Cause	Retained
Westmount–Saint-Georges	July 6, 1955	George Carlyle Marler	Liberal	John Richard Hyde	Liberal	Resignation to enter federal politics	Yes
Saint-Hyacinthe	July 6, 1955	Ernest-Joseph Chartier	Union Nationale	Pierre-Jacques-François Bousquet	Union Nationale	Death	Yes
Montréal-Laurier	July 6, 1955	Paul Provençal	Union Nationale	Arsène Gagné	Union Nationale	Death	Yes
Compton	September 15, 1954	Charles Daniel French	Union Nationale	John William French	Union Nationale	Death	Yes
Portneuf	July 9, 1953	Bona Dussault	Union Nationale	Rosaire Chalifour	Union Nationale	Death	Yes
Montréal-Outremont	July 9, 1953	Henri Groulx	Liberal	Georges-Émile Lapalme	Liberal	Death	Yes
Matapédia	July 9, 1953	Philippe Cossette	Union Nationale	Clovis Gagnon	Union Nationale	Death (car accident)	Yes

== 23rd Legislative Assembly of Quebec 1948–1952 ==
By-election	Date	Incumbent	Party	Winner	Party	Cause	Retained
Lévis	February 16, 1949	Joseph-Théophile Larochelle	Union Nationale	Joseph-Albert Samson	Union Nationale	Appointed to the Legislative Council	Yes
Brome	December 7, 1948†	Jonathan Robinson	Union Nationale	Charles James Warwick Fox	Union Nationale	Death	Yes

† Won by acclamation

== 22nd Legislative Assembly of Quebec 1944–1948 ==
By-election	Date	Incumbent	Party	Winner	Party	Cause	Retained
Huntingdon	July 23, 1947	Dennis James O'Connor	Liberal	John Gillies Rennie	Union Nationale	Death	No
Bagot	December 18, 1946	Cyrille Dumaine	Liberal	Daniel Johnson	Union Nationale	Death	No
Compton	July 3, 1946	William James Duffy	Liberal	Charles Daniel French	Union Nationale	Death	No
Beauce	November 21, 1945	Édouard Lacroix	Bloc populaire canadien	Georges-Octave Poulin	Union Nationale	Resignation	No

== 21st Legislative Assembly of Quebec 1939–1944 ==
By-election	Date	Incumbent	Party	Winner	Party	Cause	Retained
Westmount–Saint-Georges	March 23, 1942	George Gordon Hyde	Liberal	George Carlyle Marler	Liberal	Appointed to the Legislative Council	Yes
Richelieu-Verchères	March 23, 1942	Félix Messier	Liberal	Joseph-Willie Robidoux	Liberal	Appointed to the Legislative Council	Yes
Montréal–Saint-Jacques	March 23, 1942	Joseph-Roméo Toupin	Liberal	Claude Jodoin	Liberal	Death	Yes
Montréal–Sainte-Anne	March 23, 1942	Francis Lawrence Connors	Liberal	Thomas Guérin	Liberal	Appointed to the Legislative Council	Yes
Saint-Jean–Napierville	October 6, 1941	Alexis Bouthillier	Liberal	Jean-Paul Beaulieu	Union Nationale	Death	No
Huntingdon	October 6, 1941	James Walker Ross	Liberal	Dennis James O'Connor	Liberal	Death	Yes
Terrebonne	November 19, 1940	Athanase David	Liberal	Damase Perrier	Liberal	Appointed to the Senate	Yes
Mégantic	November 19, 1940	Louis Houde	Liberal	Tancrède Labbé	Union Nationale	Resignation to be appointed a judge	No

== 20th Legislative Assembly of Quebec 1936–1939 ==
By-election	Date	Incumbent	Party	Winner	Party	Cause	Retained
Stanstead	November 2, 1938	Rouville Beaudry	Union Nationale	Henri Gérin	Union Nationale	Resignation	Yes
Montréal–Saint-Louis	November 2, 1938	Peter Bercovitch	Liberal	Louis Fitch	Union Nationale	Resignation to enter federal politics	No
Chicoutimi	May 25, 1938	Arthur Larouche	Union Nationale	Antonio Talbot	Union Nationale	Resignation	Yes
Bagot	February 16, 1938	Cyrille Dumaine	Liberal	Philippe Adam	Union Nationale	Void Election	No
Beauce	March 17, 1937	Raoul Poulin	Union Nationale	Joseph-Emile Perron	Union Nationale	Resignation	Yes

== 19th Legislative Assembly of Quebec 1935–1936 ==
no by-elections

== 18th Legislative Assembly of Quebec 1931–1935 ==
By-election	Date	Incumbent	Party	Winner	Party	Cause	Retained
Jacques-Cartier	November 25, 1933†	Victor Marchand	Liberal	Joseph-Théodule Rhéaume	Liberal	Appointed to the Legislative Council	Yes
Wolfe	November 14, 1933	Cyrénus Lemieux	Liberal	Thomas Hercule Lapointe	Liberal	Appointed Sheriff	Yes
Nicolet	November 7, 1933†	Joseph-Alcide Savoie	Liberal	Alexandre Gaudet	Liberal	Death	Yes

† Won by acclamation

== 17th Legislative Assembly of Quebec (1927–1931) ==
By-election	Date	Incumbent	Party	Winner	Party	Cause	Retained
Maskinongé	November 4, 1930	Joseph-William Gagnon	Liberal	Louis-Joseph Thisdel	Liberal	Death	Yes
Huntingdon	November 4, 1930	Andrew Philps	Liberal	Martin Bettie Fisher	Conservative	Death	No
Deux-Montagnes	November 4, 1930	Arthur Sauvé	Conservative	Paul Sauvé	Conservative	Resignation to contest the 1930 federal election	Yes
Bellechasse	October 20, 1930	Antonin Galipeault	Liberal	Robert Taschereau	Liberal	Appointed a judge	Yes
Beauce	December 9, 1929†	Joseph-Hugues Fortier	Liberal	Joseph-Édouard Fortin	Liberal	Appointed a judge	Yes
Montcalm	November 16, 1929	Joseph-Ferdinand Daniel	Liberal	Joseph-Léonide Perron	Liberal	Appointed to the Legislative Council	Yes
Richelieu	October 28, 1929	Jean-Baptiste Lafrenière	Liberal	Avila Turcotte	Liberal	Appointed Chairman of the Commission of Agricultural Credit	Yes
Compton	September 30, 1929	Jacob Nicol	Liberal	Andrew Ross McMaster	Liberal	Appointed to the Legislative Council	Yes
L'Islet	May 13, 1929†	Élisée Thériault	Liberal	Adélard Godbout	Liberal	Appointed to the Legislative Council	Yes
Québec-Est	October 24, 1928	Louis-Alfred Létourneau	Liberal	Oscar Drouin	Liberal	Appointed to the Legislative Council	Yes
Montréal–Sainte-Marie	October 24, 1928	Joseph Gauthier	Liberal	Camillien Houde	Conservative	Void Election	No
Îles-de-la-Madeleine	July 14, 1928†	Joseph-Édouard Caron	Liberal	Amédée Caron	Liberal	Appointed to the Legislative Council	Yes
Portneuf	October 31, 1927	Édouard Hamel	Liberal	Victor Marchand	Liberal	Appointed Registrar	Yes
Kamouraska	October 31, 1927	Nérée Morin	Liberal	Pierre Gagnon	Liberal	Death	Yes

† Won by acclamation

== 16th Legislative Assembly of Quebec 1923–1927 ==
By-election	Date	Incumbent	Party	Winner	Party	Cause	Retained
Jacques-Cartier	November 30, 1925	Esioff-Léon Patenaude	Conservative	Victor Marchand	Liberal	Resignation to contest the 1925 federal election	No
Champlain	November 30, 1925	Bruno Bordeleau	Liberal	William-Pierre Grant	Liberal	Appointed registrar	Yes
Berthier	November 30, 1925	Siméon Lafrenière	Liberal	Amédée Sylvestre	Liberal	Appointed registrar	Yes
Argenteuil	November 30, 1925	John Hay	Liberal	Joseph-Léon Saint-Jacques	Conservative	Death	No
Témiscamingue	November 28, 1924	Télesphore Simard	Liberal	Joseph Miljours	Liberal	Death	Yes
Sherbrooke	November 5, 1924	Moïse O'Bready	Conservative	Armand-Charles Crépeau	Conservative	Death	Yes
Saint-Maurice	November 5, 1924	Léonide-Nestor-Arthur Ricard	Liberal	Alphonse-Edgar Guillemette	Liberal	Death (car accident)	Yes
Québec-Comté	November 5, 1924	Aurèle Leclerc	Liberal	Ludger Bastien	Conservative	Appointed registrar	No
Montréal–Sainte-Anne	November 5, 1924	William James Hushion	Liberal	Joseph Henry Dillon	Liberal	Resignation to enter federal politics	Yes
Bonaventure	November 5, 1924	Joseph-Fabien Bugeaud	Liberal	Pierre-Émile Côté	Liberal	Appointed a judge	Yes
Yamaska	October 22, 1923	Édouard Ouellette	Liberal	David Laperrière	Liberal	Appointed to the Legislative Council	Yes
Richmond	October 22, 1923	Georges-Ervé Denault	Liberal	Stanislas-Edmond Desmarais	Liberal	Death	Yes
Brome	October 22, 1923	William Robert Oliver	Liberal	Carlton James Oliver	Liberal	Death	Yes
Abitibi	October 22, 1923	Joseph-Édouard Perrault	Liberal	Hector Authier	Liberal	Chose to sit for Arthabaska	Yes

== 15th Legislative Assembly of Quebec 1919–1923 ==
By-election	Date	Incumbent	Party	Winner	Party	Cause	Retained
Sherbrooke	September 7, 1922†	Joseph-Henri Lemay	Liberal	Ludger Forest	Liberal	Appointed a judge	Yes
Labelle	August 17, 1922	Honoré Achim	Liberal	Désiré Lahaie	Liberal	Appointed a judge	Yes
Verchères	December 22, 1921	Adrien Beaudry	Liberal	Jean-Marie Richard	Liberal	Appointed Chairman of the Public Services Commission	Yes
Témiscouata	December 22, 1921	Louis-Eugène-Aduire Parrot	Liberal	Eugène Godbout	Liberal	Resignation	Yes
Montréal–Ste-Marie	December 22, 1921	Napoléon Séguin	Liberal	Joseph Gauthier	Parti ouvrier	Appointed Governor of Bordeaux Prison	No
Wolfe	December 15, 1921†	Joseph-Eugène Rhéault	Liberal	Cyrinus Lemieux	Liberal	Death	Yes
Trois-Rivières	December 15, 1921†	Joseph-Adolphe Tessier	Liberal	Louis-Philippe Mercier	Liberal	Appointed Chairman of the Running Streams Commission	Yes
Richmond	December 15, 1921†	Walter George Mitchell	Liberal	Jacob Nicol	Liberal	Resignation to contest the 1921 federal election	Yes
Beauce	December 15, 1921†	Arthur Godbout	Liberal	Joseph-Hughes Fortier	Liberal	Appointed a judge	Yes
Saint-Maurice	October 19, 1920	Georges-Isidore Delisle	Liberal	Léonide-Nestor-Arthur Ricard	Liberal	Death	Yes
Kamouraska	October 19, 1920	Charles-Adolphe Stein	Liberal	Nérée Morin	Liberal	Resignation to enter federal politics	Yes
Portneuf	October 11, 1920†	Lomer Gouin	Liberal	Édouard Hamel	Liberal	Appointed to the Legislative Council	Yes
Terrebonne	September 6, 1919†	Athanase David	Liberal	Athanase David	Liberal	Sought re-election upon appointment as Provincial Secretary	Yes
Bellechasse	September 6, 1919†	Antonin Galipeault	Liberal	Antonin Galipeault	Liberal	Sought re-election upon appointment as Minister of Public Works and Labour	Yes
Arthabaska	September 6, 1919†	Joseph-Édouard Perrault	Liberal	Joseph-Édouard Perrault	Liberal	Sought re-election upon appointment as Minister of Colonization, Mines and Fisheries	Yes

† Won by acclamation

== 14th Legislative Assembly of Quebec 1916–1919 ==
By-election	Date	Incumbent	Party	Winner	Party	Cause	Retained
Napierville	December 27, 1918	Cyprien Doris	Liberal	Amédée Monet	Liberal	Death	Yes
Montréal-St-Laurent	December 27, 1918	John Thomas Finnie	Liberal	Henry Miles	Liberal	Appointed Collector of Provincial Revenue	Yes
Matane	December 27, 1918	Donat Caron	Liberal	Octave Fortin	Liberal	Death	Yes
Ottawa	December 15, 1917†	Ferdinand-Ambroise Gendron	Liberal	Joseph Caron	Liberal	Death	Yes
Nicolet	December 15, 1917†	Arthur Trahan	Liberal	Joseph-Alcide Savoie	Liberal	Resignation to contest the 1917 federal election	Yes
Labelle	December 15, 1917†	Hyacinthe-Adélard Fortier	Liberal	Honoré Achim	Liberal	Resignation to contest the 1917 federal election	Yes
Dorchester	December 15, 1917†	Lucien Cannon	Liberal	Ernest Ouellet	Liberal	Resignation to enter federal politics	Yes
Montcalm	November 12, 1917†	Joseph-Alcide Dupuis	Liberal	Joseph-Ferdinand Daniel	Liberal	Death	Yes
Brome	November 12, 1917†	William Frederick Bilas	Liberal	William Robert Oliver	Liberal	Appointed to the Legislative Council	Yes

† Won by acclamation

== 13th Legislative Assembly of Quebec 1912–1916 ==
By-election	Date	Incumbent	Party	Winner	Party	Cause	Retained
Richmond	November 21, 1914†	Peter Samuel George Mackenzie	Liberal	Walter George Mitchell	Liberal	Death	Yes
Châteauguay	May 9, 1914†	Honoré Mercier Jr.	Liberal	Honoré Mercier Jr.	Liberal	Sought re-election upon appointment as Minister of Colonization, Mines and Fisheries	Yes
Bonaventure	May 7, 1914†	John Hall Kelly	Liberal	Joseph-Fabien Bugeaud	Liberal	Appointed to the Legislative Council	Yes
Trois-Rivières	March 18, 1914	Joseph-Adolphe Tessier	Liberal	Joseph-Adolphe Tessier	Liberal	Sought re-election upon appointment as Minister of Highways	Yes
St-Jean	November 10, 1913	Lomer Gouin	Liberal	Marcellin Robert	Liberal	Chose to sit for Portneuf	Yes
Huntingdon	November 10, 1913	William H. Walker	Liberal	Andrew Philps	Liberal	Death	Yes
Nicolet	June 2, 1913	Charles Ramsay Devlin	Liberal	Laetare Roy	Liberal	Chose to sit for Témiscamingue	Yes
Dorchester	June 2, 1913	Alfred Morissett	Liberal	Lucien Cannon	Liberal	Appointed Clerk of the Executive Council	Yes
Stanstead	January 16, 1913†	Prosper-Alfred Bissonnet	Liberal	Alfred-Joseph Bissonnett	Liberal	Appointed Collector of Revenue	Yes
Bagot	January 16, 1913†	Frédéric-Hector Daigneault	Liberal	Joseph-Émery Phaneuf	Liberal	Appointed Inspector of Asylums and Prisons	Yes
Verchères	October 16, 1912†	Amédée Geoffrion	Liberal	Joseph-Léonide Perron	Liberal	Appointed Recorder of Montreal	Yes

† Won by acclamation

== 12th Legislative Assembly of Quebec 1908–1912 ==
By-election	Date	Incumbent	Party	Winner	Party	Cause	Retained
Lévis	September 21, 1911	Jean-Cléophas Blouin	Liberal	Laetare Roy	Liberal	Appointed Sheriff	Yes
Sherbrooke	August 17, 1911†	Jean-Marie-Joseph-Pantaléon Pelletier	Liberal	Calixte-Émile Therrien	Liberal	Appointed Agent-General in London	Yes
St. Jean	December 29, 1910	Gabriel Marchand	Liberal	Marcellin Robert	Liberal	Death	Yes
Drummond	March 5, 1910	Joseph Laferté	Liberal	Jules Allard	Liberal	Void Election	Yes
Argenteuil	March 5, 1910	William Alexander Weir	Liberal	John Hay	Liberal	Appointed a judge	Yes
Gaspé	February 17, 1910	Louis-Joseph Lemieux	Liberal	Joseph-Léonide Perron	Liberal	Appointed Sheriff	Yes
Richmond	January 27, 1910†	Peter Samuel George Mackenzie	Liberal	Peter Samuel George Mackenzie	Liberal	Sought re-election upon appointment as Provincial Treasurer	Yes
Kamouraska	December 6, 1909†	Louis-Rodolphe Roy	Liberal	Louis-Auguste Dupuis	Liberal	Appointed a judge	Yes
L'Islet	November 29, 1909†	Joseph-Édouard Caron	Liberal	Joseph-Édouard Caron	Liberal	Sought re-election upon appointment as Minister of Agriculture	Yes
St. Sauveur	November 12, 1909	Charles-Eugene Côté	Liberal	Joseph-Alphonse Langlois	Parti ouvrier	Appointed registrar	No
Montréal division no. 2	November 12, 1909	Henri Bourassa	Ligue nationaliste canadienne	Clement Robillard	Liberal	Chose to sit for St. Hyacinthe	No
Chambly	November 12, 1909	Maurice Perrault	Liberal	Lesieur Desaulniers	Liberal	Death	Yes
Hochelaga	February 2, 1909†	Louis-Jérémie Décarie	Liberal	Louis-Jérémie Décarie	Liberal	Sought re-election upon appointment as Minister of Agriculture	Yes
Bellechasse	February 2, 1909†	Adélard Turgeon	Liberal	Antonin Galipeault	Liberal	Appointed to the Legislative Council	Yes
Montréal division no. 6	December 28, 1908	Denis Tansey	Conservative	Michael James Walsh	Liberal	Void Election	No
Laval	December 28, 1908	Joseph-Wenceslas Lévesque	Liberal	Joseph-Wenceslas Lévesque	Liberal	Void Election	Yes
Châteauguay	December 28, 1908	Hospice Dumtremble	Conservative	Honoré Mercier Jr.	Liberal	Void Election	No
Québec Centre	December 23, 1908	Amédée Robitaille	Liberal	Eugène Leclerc	Liberal	Appointed a prothonotary	Yes
Montréal division no. 1	December 21, 1908†	Georges-Albini Lacombe	Liberal	Napoléon Séguin	Liberal	Appointed registrar	Yes
Rouville	October 26, 1908	Alfred Girard	Liberal	Joseph-Edmond Robert	Liberal	Appointed a prothonotary	Yes
Lac-Saint-Jean	October 14, 1908†	Theodore-Louis-Antoine Broet	Liberal	Jean-Baptiste Carbonneau	Liberal	Death (railroad accident)	Yes

† Won by acclamation

== 11th Legislative Assembly of Quebec 1904–1908 ==
By-election	Date	Incumbent	Party	Winner	Party	Cause	Retained
Châteauguay	December 16, 1907	François-Xavier Dupuis	Liberal	Honoré Mercier Jr.	Liberal	Appointed Recorder of the Municipal Court of Montreal	Yes
Rimouski	November 4, 1907	Auguste Tessier	Liberal	Pierre-Émile D'Anjou	Liberal	Appointed a judge	Yes
Nicolet	November 4, 1907	Alfred Marchildon	Liberal	Charles Ramsey Devlin	Liberal	Resignation pending appointment as a judge	Yes
Montmorency	November 4, 1907	Louis-Alexandre Taschereau	Liberal	Louis-Alexandre Taschereau	Liberal	Sought re-election upon appointment as Minister of Public Works and Labor	Yes
Bellechasse	November 4, 1907	Adélard Turgeon	Liberal	Adélard Turgeon	Liberal	Sought re-election against Henri Bourassa	Yes
Montréal division no. 5	January 24, 1907	Christopher Benfield Carter	Liberal	Charles Ernest Gault	Conservative	Death	No
Îles-de-la-Madeleine	November 20, 1906	Robert Jamieson Leslie	Liberal	Louis-Albin Thériault	Liberal	Death (shipwreck)	Yes
Iberville	November 5, 1906	François Gosselin	Liberal	Joseph-Aldéric Benoit	Liberal	Appointed to the Legislative Council	Yes
L'Assomption	October 29, 1906†	Joseph-Edouard Duhamel	Liberal	Louis-Joseph Gauthier	Liberal	Appointed Inspector of the Registration Office	Yes
Brome	September 10, 1906†	John Charles McCorkill	Liberal	William Frederick Vilas	Liberal	Appointed a judge	Yes
Argenteuil	September 10, 1906†	William Alexander Weir	Liberal	William Alexander Weir	Liberal	Sought re-election upon appointment as Minister of Public Works and Labor	Yes
Napierville	December 14, 1905	Dominique Monet	Liberal	Cyprien Dorris	Liberal	Appointed Protonotary	Yes
St. Sauveur	October 14, 1905	Simon-Napoléon Parent	Liberal	Charles-Eugène Côté	Liberal	Resignation to be appointed Chairman of the Transcontinental Railway Commission	Yes
Montréal division no. 4	October 7, 1905†	James Cochrane	Liberal	George Washington Stephens, Jr.	Liberal	Death	Yes
Terrebonne	July 17, 1905†	Jean Prévost	Liberal	Jean Prévost	Liberal	Sought re-election upon appointment as Minister of Colonization, Mines and Fisheries	Yes
Yamaska	June 20, 1905†	Jules Allard	Liberal	Guillaume-Édouard Ouellet	Liberal	Appointed to the Legislative Council	Yes
Montréal division no. 2	April 10, 1905	Lomer Gouin	Liberal	Lomer Gouin	Liberal	Sought re-election upon appointment as Premier and Attorney General	Yes
Rimouski	April 3, 1905†	Auguste Tessier	Liberal	Auguste Tessier	Liberal	Sought re-election upon appointment as Minister of Agriculture	Yes
Kamouraska	April 3, 1905†	Louis-Rodolphe Roy	Liberal	Louis-Rodolphe Roy	Liberal	Sought re-election upon appointment as Provincial Secretary	Yes
Bellechasse	April 3, 1905†	Adélard Turgeon	Liberal	Adélard Turgeon	Liberal	Sought re-election upon appointment as Minister of Lands, Mines and Fisheries	Yes

† Won by acclamation

== 10th Legislative Assembly of Quebec 1900–1904 ==
By-election	Date	Incumbent	Party	Winner	Party	Cause	Retained
Shefford	March 10, 1904	Tancrède Boucher de Grandbois	Liberal	Auguste Mathieu	Liberal	Resignation	Yes
Portneuf	March 10, 1904	Jules Tessier	Liberal	Damase-Épiphane Naud	Conservative	Appointed to the Senate	No
Maskinongé	March 10, 1904	Hector Caron	Liberal	Georges Lafontaine	Conservative	Appointed Superintendent of Game and Fisheries	No
Berthier	March 10, 1904	Cuthbert-Alphonse Chênevert	Liberal	Joseph Lafontaine	Liberal	Appointed Recorder for the Quebec Court of Appeal	Yes
Brome	October 29, 1903	Henry Thomas Duffy	Liberal	John Charles McCorkill	Liberal	Death	Yes
Stanstead	October 3, 1902	Moodie Brock Lovell	Liberal	Georges-Henri Saint-Pierre	Conservative	Death	No
Soulanges	October 3, 1902	Avila-Gonzague Bourbonnais	Liberal	Arcand-Momer Bissonnette	Conservative	Death	No
L'Islet	September 26, 1902†	François-Gilbert Miville Dechêne	Liberal	Joseph-Édouard Caron	Liberal	Death	Yes
Québec Centre	July 11, 1902†	Amédée Robitaille	Liberal	Amédée Robitaille	Liberal	Sought re-election upon appointment as Provincial Secretary	Yes
Beauce	January 31, 1902	Henri Sévérin Béland	Liberal	Arthur Godbout	Liberal	Resignation to enter federal politics	Yes
Vaudreuil	October 31, 1901	Émery Lalonde	Liberal	Hormidas Pilon	Liberal	Appointed Registrar	Yes
Québec Comté	October 31, 1901	Némèse Garneau	Liberal	Cyrille-Fraser Delâge	Liberal	Appointed to the Legislative Council	Yes
Drummond	October 31, 1901	William John Watts	Liberal	Joseph Laferté	Liberal	Appointed Registrar	Yes
Lévis	October 24, 1901†	Charles Langelier	Liberal	Jean-Cléophas Blouin	Liberal	Appointed Sheriff	Yes

† Won by acclamation

== 9th Legislative Assembly of Quebec 1897–1900 ==
By-election	Date	Incumbent	Party	Winner	Party	Cause	Retained
Matane	January 11, 1899	Louis-Félix Pinault	Liberal	Donat Caron	Liberal	Appointed Deputy Minister of Militia	Yes
Verchères	December 19, 1898	Étienne Blanchard	Liberal	Étienne Blanchard	Liberal	Void Election	Yes
Missisquoi	December 19, 1898	John Charles McCorkill	Liberal	Cedric Lemoine Cotton	Liberal	Appointed to the Legislative Council	Yes
Lévis	December 19, 1898	Nazaire-Nicolas Olivier	Liberal	Charles Langelier	Liberal	Death	Yes
Beauharnois	December 19, 1898	Élie-Hercule Bisson	Liberal	Arthur Plante	Conservative	Appointed Prothonotary for Beauharnois	No
Bonaventure	December 22, 1897	Victor Gladu	Liberal	Jules Allard	Liberal	Death	Yes
Lévis	December 22, 1897	François-Xavier Lemieux	Liberal	Nazaire-Nicolas Olivier	Liberal	Appointed a judge	Yes
Bonaventure	December 22, 1897	François-Xavier Lemieux	Liberal	William Henry Clapperton	Liberal	Appointed a judge	Yes
Yamaska	November 16, 1897	Albéric-Archie Mondou	Conservative	Victor Gladu	Liberal	Void Election	No
Brome	June 19, 1897	Henry Thomas Duffy	Liberal	Henry Thomas Duffy	Liberal	Sought re-election upon appointment as Commissioner of Public Works	Yes
St. Sauveur	June 12, 1897†	Simon-Napoléon Parent	Liberal	Simon-Napoléon Parent	Liberal	Sought re-election upon appointment as Commissioner of Lands, Forests and Fisheries	Yes
St. Jean	June 12, 1897†	Félix-Gabriel Marchand	Liberal	Félix-Gabriel Marchand	Liberal	Sought re-election upon appointment as Premier and Provincial Treasurer	Yes
L'Islet	June 12, 1897†	François-Gilbert Miville Dechêne	Liberal	François-Gilbert Miville Dechêne	Liberal	Sought re-election upon appointment as Commissioner of Agriculture	Yes
Châteauguay	June 12, 1897†	Joseph-Émery Robidoux	Liberal	Joseph-Émery Robidoux	Liberal	Sought re-election upon appointment as Provincial Secretary	Yes
Bellechasse	June 12, 1897†	Adélard Turgeon	Liberal	Adélard Turgeon	Liberal	Sought re-election upon appointment as Commissioner of Colonization and Mines	Yes

† Won by acclamation

== 8th Legislative Assembly of Quebec 1892–1897 ==
By-election	Date	Incumbent	Party	Winner	Party	Cause	Retained
Montmorency	June 23, 1896	Thomas Chase-Casgrain	Conservative	Édouard Bouffard	Conservative	Resignation to contest the 1896 federal election	Yes
Montréal division no. 4	June 4, 1896†	Alexander Webb Morris	Conservative	Albert William Atwater	Conservative	Resignation to provide a seat for Atwater	Yes
Montréal division no. 6	October 22, 1895	Patrick Kennedy	Conservative	James John Edmund Guerin	Liberal	Death	No
Stanstead	March 21, 1895	Michael Felix Hackett	Conservative	Michael Felix Hackett	Conservative	Sought re-election upon appointment as President of the Executive Council	Yes
Bonaventure	December 11, 1894	Honoré Mercier	Liberal	François-Xavier Lemieux	Liberal	Death	Yes
Compton	October 19, 1894	John McIntosh	Conservative	Charles McClary	Conservative	Appointed Sheriff	Yes
Chambly	December 31, 1892†	Louis-Olivier Taillon	Conservative	Louis-Olivier Taillon	Conservative	Sought re-election upon appointment as Premier	Yes
Trois-Rivières	November 3, 1892	Télesphore-Eusèbe Normand	Conservative	Télesphore-Eusèbe Normand	Conservative	Void Election	Yes
Matane	November 3, 1892	Edmund James Flynn	Conservative	Louis-Félix Pinault	Liberal	Chose to sit for Gaspé	No
Beauharnois	June 7, 1892	Moïse Plante	Conservative	Élie-Hercule Bisson	Liberal	Death	No

† Won by acclamation

== 7th Legislative Assembly of Quebec 1890–1891 ==
By-election	Date	Incumbent	Party	Winner	Party	Cause	Retained
Vaudreuil	November 22, 1890	Émery Lalonde	Liberal	Émery Lalonde	Liberal	Void Election	Yes
Montmorency	July 12, 1890†	Charles Langelier	Liberal	Charles Langelier	Liberal	Sought re-election upon appointment as President of the Executive Council	Yes

† Won by acclamation

== 6th Legislative Assembly of Quebec 1886–1890 ==
By-election	Date	Incumbent	Party	Winner	Party	Cause	Retained
Berthier	January 15, 1890	Louis Sylvestre	Liberal	Omer Dostaler	Liberal	Resignation to be appointed to the Legislative Council	Yes
Québec Ouest	December 30, 1889	Owen Murphy	Liberal	Owen Murphy	Liberal	Void Election	Yes
Rimouski	December 4, 1889	Édouard-Onésiphore Martin	Liberal	Auguste Tessier	Liberal	Death	Yes
Brome	November 28, 1889	William Warren Lynch	Conservative	Rufus Nelson England	Conservative	Appointed a judge	Yes
Joliette	October 23, 1889	Louis Basinet	Liberal	Louis Basinet	Liberal	Void Election	Yes
Laprairie	January 24, 1889	Odilon Goyette	Parti national	Odilon Goyette	Parti national	Void Election	Yes
Mégantic	December 27, 1888	Andrew Stuart Johnson	Liberal	William Rhodes	Liberal	Void Election	Yes
L'Assomption	December 27, 1888	Ludger Forest	Liberal	Ludger Forest	Liberal	Void Election	Yes
Dorchester	December 20, 1888†	Louis-Napoléon Larochelle	Liberal	Louis-Philippe Pelletier	Nationalist Conservative	Appointed to the Legislative Council	No
Nicolet	July 17, 1888	Louis-Trefflé Dorais	Independent Conservative	Honoré Brunelle Tourigny	Conservative	Void Election	No
Chicoutimi et Saguenay	June 18, 1888	Élie Saint-Hilaire	Independent Conservative	Séverin Dumais	Parti national	Death	No
Trois-Rivières	May 25, 1888	Arthur Turcotte	Liberal	Arthur Turcotte	Liberal	Sought re-election upon appointment as Attorney General	Yes
Shefford	May 18, 1888	Thomas Brassard	Liberal	Tancrède Boucher de Grosbois	Liberal	Void Election	Yes
Laval	May 8, 1888	Pierre-Évariste Leblanc	Conservative	Pierre-Évariste Leblanc	Conservative	Void Election	Yes
Missisquoi	April 28, 1888	Elijah Edmund Spencer	Conservative	Elijah Edmund Spencer	Conservative	Void Election	Yes
Maskinongé	April 28, 1888	Édouard Caron	Conservative	Joseph-Hormisdas Legris	Parti national	Void Election	No
Hochelaga	April 28, 1888	Joseph-Octave Villeneuve	Conservative	Charles Champagne	Liberal	Void Election	No
Ottawa	September 14, 1887	Narcisse-Édouard Cormier	Conservative	Alfred Rochon	Liberal	Resignation in exchange for withdrawal of election petition	No
Laprairie	July 30, 1887	Léon-Benoît-Alfred Charlebois	Conservative	Odilon Goyette	Parti national	Death	No
St. Hyacinthe	February 12, 1887†	Honoré Mercier	Liberal	Honoré Mercier	Liberal	Sought re-election upon appointment as Premier and Attorney General	Yes
Québec Est	February 12, 1887†	Joseph Shehyn	Liberal	Joseph Shehyn	Liberal	Sought re-election upon appointment as Provincial Treasurer	Yes
Montréal Centre	February 12, 1887†	James McShane	Liberal	James McShane	Liberal	Sought re-election upon appointment as Commissioner of Agriculture and Public Works	Yes
Kamouraska	February 12, 1887†	Charles-Antoine-Ernest Gagnon	Liberal	Charles-Antoine-Ernest Gagnon	Liberal	Sought re-election upon appointment as Provincial Secretary	Yes
Iberville	February 12, 1887†	Georges Duhamel	Parti national	Georges Duhamel	Parti national	Sought re-election upon appointment as Solicitor General	Yes
Montcalm	December 11, 1886	Jean-Baptiste-Trefflé Richard	Conservative	Louis-Olivier Taillon	Conservative	Appointed crown lands agent	Yes
Iberville	December 11, 1886	Alexis-Louis Demers	Liberal	Georges Duhamel	Parti national*	Death	Yes

† Won by acclamation

* The Parti National was the official name of the Quebec Liberal Party during this period

== 5th Legislative Assembly of Quebec 1881–1886 ==
By-election	Date	Incumbent	Party	Winner	Party	Cause	Retained
Verchères	May 5, 1886	Abraham Bernard	Liberal	Abraham Bernard	Liberal	Void Election	Yes
Drummond et Arthabaska	March 24, 1886	William John Watts	Liberal	Joseph-Éna Girouard	Liberal	Resignation over disagreement with his party over Louis Riel	Yes
Lotbinière	January 30, 1886	Henri-Gustave Joly de Lotbinière	Liberal	Édouard-Hippolyte Laliberté	Liberal	Resignation over disagreement with his party over Louis Riel	Yes
Joliette	September 24, 1885	Vincent-Paul Lavallée	Conservative	Joseph-Norbert-Alfred McConville	Conservative	Appointed to the Legislative Council	Yes
Mégantic	October 29, 1884	George Irvine	Liberal	John Whyte	Liberal	Appointed a judge	Yes
Laval	July 14, 1884	Amédée Gaboury	Liberal	Pierre-Évariste Leblanc	Conservative	Void Election	No
Vaudreuil	June 19, 1884†	François-Xavier Archambault	Conservative	Alfred Lapointe	Conservative	Void Election	Yes
Gaspé	April 2, 1884	Edmund James Flynn	Conservative	Edmund James Flynn	Conservative	Sought re-election upon appointment as Commissioner of Railways	Yes
Trois-Rivières	March 26, 1884	Sévère Dumoulin	Conservative	Arthur Turcotte	Independent Conservative	Void Election	No
Jacques Cartier	March 26, 1884	Joseph-Alfred Mousseau	Conservative	Arthur Boyer	Liberal	Appointed a judge	No
Deux-Montagnes	March 26, 1884	Benjamin Beauchamp	Conservative	Benjamin Beauchamp	Conservative	Void Election	Yes
Chateauguay	March 26, 1884	Édouard Laberge	Liberal	Joseph-Émery Robidoux	Liberal	Death	Yes
Sherbrooke	February 9, 1884†	Joseph Gibb Robertson	Conservative	Joseph Gibb Robertson	Conservative	Sought re-election upon appointment as Provincial Treasurer	Yes
Montreal Est	February 9, 1884†	Louis-Olivier Taillon	Conservative	Louis-Olivier Taillon	Conservative	Sought re-election upon appointment as Attorney General	Yes
Lévis	November 16, 1883	Étienne-Théodore Pâquet	Conservative	François-Xavier Lemieux	Liberal	Appointed Sheriff	No
Jacques Cartier	September 26, 1883	Joseph-Alfred Mousseau	Conservative	Joseph-Alfred Mousseau	Conservative	Void Election	Yes
Laval	June 13, 1883	Pierre-Évariste Leblanc	Conservative	Amédée Gaboury	Liberal	Void Election	No
Nicolet	February 5, 1883	Charles-Édouard Houde	Conservative	Louis-Trefflé Dorais	Independent Conservative	Void Election	No
Kamouraska	January 30, 1883	Charles-Antoine-Ernest Gagnon	Liberal	Charles-Antoine-Ernest Gagnon	Liberal	Void Election	Yes
Bonaventure	October 31, 1882†	Louis-Joseph Riopel	Conservative	Henri-Josué Martin	Conservative	Resignation to contest the 1882 federal election	Yes
Vaudreuil	October 30, 1882	Émery Lalonde	Conservative	François-Xavier Archambault	Conservative	Resignation upon appointment as an official at the Palace of Justice in Montreal	Yes
Laval	October 30, 1882	Louis-Onésime Loranger	Conservative	Pierre-Évariste Leblanc	Conservative	Appointed a judge	Yes
Deux-Montagnes	October 21, 1882	Charles Champagne	Conservative	Benjamin Beauchamp	Conservative	Sought re-election following dismissal of election petition	Yes
Jacques-Cartier	August 26, 1882	Narcisse Lecavalier	Conservative	Joseph-Alfred Mousseau	Conservative	Appointed Registrar	Yes
Terrebonne	August 19, 1882†	Joseph-Adolphe Chapleau	Conservative	Guillaume-Alphonse Nantel	Conservative	Resignation upon appointment to the federal cabinet	Yes
Beauce	August 14, 1880†	Jean Blanchet	Conservative	Jean Blanchet	Conservative	Sought re-election upon appointment as Provincial Secretary and Registrar	Yes
Pontiac	March 6, 1882	Thomas Bryson	Conservative	William Joseph Poupore	Conservative	Death	Yes
Yamaska	February 6, 1882†	Jonathan Saxton Campbell Würtele	Conservative	Jonathan Saxton Campbell Würtele	Conservative	Sought re-election upon appointment as Provincial Treasurer	Yes

† Won by acclamation

== 4th Legislative Assembly of Quebec 1878–1881 ==
By-election	Date	Incumbent	Party	Winner	Party	Cause	Retained
Berthier	December 30, 1880	Joseph Robillard	Conservative	Joseph Robillard	Conservative	Void Election	Yes
L’Assomption	June 4, 1880	Onuphe Peltier	Conservative	Joseph Marion	Conservative	Death	Yes
Chicoutimi et Saguenay	March 27, 1880†	William Evan Price	Conservative	Joseph-Élisée Beaudet	Conservative	Resignation	Yes
Rimouski	March 3, 1880	Alexandre Chauveau	Liberal	Joseph Parent	Liberal	Appointed a judge	Yes
Gaspé	December 6, 1879†	Edmund James Flynn*	Conservative	Edmund James Flynn	Conservative	Sought re-election upon appointment as Commissioner of Crown Lands	Yes
Sherbrooke	November 20, 1879	Joseph Gibb Robertson	Conservative	Joseph Gibb Robertson	Conservative	Sought re-election upon appointment as Provincial Treasurer	Yes
Lévis	November 20, 1879	Étienne-Théodore Pâquet*	Conservative	Étienne-Théodore Pâquet	Conservative	Sought re-election upon appointment as Provincial Secretary and Registrar	Yes
Brome	November 20, 1879	William Warren Lynch	Conservative	William Warren Lynch	Conservative	Sought re-election upon appointment as Solicitor General	Yes
Terrebonne	November 13, 1879†	Joseph-Adolphe Chapleau	Conservative	Joseph-Adolphe Chapleau	Conservative	Sought re-election upon appointment as Premier and Commissioner of Agriculture and Public Works	Yes
Laval	November 13, 1879†	Louis-Onésime Loranger	Conservative	Louis-Onésime Loranger	Conservative	Sought re-election upon appointment as Attorney General	Yes
Verchères	July 17, 1879	Jean-Baptiste Brousseau	Liberal	Achille Larose	Liberal	Void Election	Yes
Chambly	June 26, 1879	Michel-Dosithée-Stanislas Martel	Conservative	Raymond Préfontaine	Liberal	Void Election	No
Rouville	June 18, 1879	Solime Bertrand	Conservative	Flavien-Guillaume Bouthillier	Liberal	Void Election	No
St. Hyacinthe	June 3, 1879	Pierre Bachand	Liberal	Honoré Mercier	Liberal	Death	Yes

† Won by acclamation

* Flynn and Pacquet were former Liberals who crossed the floor to topple the Joly government

== 3rd Legislative Assembly of Quebec 1875–1878 ==
By-election	Date	Incumbent	Party	Winner	Party	Cause	Retained
Québec Ouest	December 17, 1877	John Hearn	Conservative	Richard Alleyn	Conservative	Appointed to the Legislative Council	Yes
Gaspé	July 2, 1877	Pierre-Étienne Fortin	Conservative	Pierre-Étienne Fortin	Conservative	Void Election	Yes
Kamouraska	March 19, 1877	Charles-François Roy	Conservative	Joseph Dumont	Liberal	Resignation to enter federal politics	No
Bonaventure	February 22, 1877	Pierre-Clovis Beauchesne	Conservative	Joseph Israël Tarte	Conservative	Void Election	Yes
Montmagny	November 30, 1876	Auguste Charles Philippe Robert Landry	Conservative	Louis-Napoléon Fortin	Liberal	Void Election	No
Nicolet	August 18, 1876	François-Xavier-Ovide Méthot	Conservative	Charles-Édouard Houde	Conservative	Void Election	Yes
Bagot	July 7, 1876	Pierre-Samuel Gendron	Conservative	Flavien Dupont	Conservative	Resignation to become Prothonotary for the Quebec Superior Court in Montreal District	Yes
Huntingdon	April 24, 1876†	Alexander Cameron	Liberal	Alexander Cameron	Liberal	Void Election	Yes
Trois-Rivières	April 18, 1876	Henri-Gédéon Malhiot	Conservative	Arthur Turcotte	Independent Conservative	Appointed Commissioner of the Quebec, Montreal, Ottawa and Occidental Railway	No
Mégantic	April 18, 1876	George Irvine	Liberal	Andrew Kennedy	Conservative	Appointed Commissioner of the Quebec, Montreal, Ottawa and Occidental Railway	No
Deux-Montagnes	March 3, 1876	Gédéon Ouimet	Conservative	Charles Champagne	Conservative	Appointed Superintendent of Public Instruction	Yes
Terrebonne	February 10, 1876†	Joseph-Adolphe Chapleau	Conservative	Joseph-Adolphe Chapleau	Conservative	Sought re-election upon appointment as Provincial Secretary and Registrar	Yes
Missisquoi	February 10, 1876†	George Barnard Baker	Conservative	George Barnard Baker	Conservative	Sought re-election upon appointment as Solicitor General	Yes

† Won by acclamation

== 2nd Legislative Assembly of Quebec 1871–1875 ==
By-election	Date	Incumbent	Party	Winner	Party	Cause	Retained
Pontiac	October 26, 1874†	John Poupore	Conservative	Levi Ruggles Church	Conservative	Resignation to provide a seat for Church	Yes
Québec-Comté	October 5, 1874†	Pierre Garneau	Conservative	Pierre Garneau	Conservative	Sought re-election upon appointment as Commissioner of Agriculture and Public Works	Yes
Montmorency	October 5, 1874†	Auguste-Réal Angers	Conservative	Auguste-Réal Angers	Conservative	Sought re-election upon appointment as Solicitor General	Yes
Trois-Rivières	October 3, 1874†	Henri-Gédéon Malhiot	Conservative	Henri-Gédéon Malhiot	Conservative	Sought re-election upon appointment as Commissioner of Crown Lands	Yes
Bonaventure	August 4–5, 1874	Théodore Robitaille	Conservative	Pierre-Clovis Beauchesne	Conservative	Resignation upon abolition of the dual mandate	Yes
Huntingdon	May 30, 1874	Thomas Sanders	Conservative	Alexander Cameron	Conservative	Death	Yes
Chicoutimi et Saguenay	May 2, 1874†	Pierre-Alexis Tremblay	Liberal	Michel Guillaume Baby	Conservative	Resignation upon abolition of the dual mandate	No
Québec Est	April 16–17, 1874	Charles Alphonse Pantaléon Pelletier	Liberal	Pierre-Vincent Valin	Conservative	Resignation upon abolition of the dual mandate	No
Québec Centre	April 16–17, 1874	Hector-Louis Langevin	Conservative	Rémi-Ferdinand Rinfret	Conservative	Resignation upon abolition of the dual mandate	Yes
Montcalm	March 13, 1874	Firmin Dugas	Conservative	Louis-Gustave Martin	Conservative	Resignation upon abolition of the dual mandate	Yes
Beauce	February 24, 1874	Christian Pozer	Liberal	François-Xavier Dulac	Conservative	Resignation upon abolition of the dual mandate	No
Drummond-Arthabaska	February 20, 1874	Wilfrid Laurier	Liberal	William John Watts	Conservative	Resignation to contest the 1874 federal election	No
Yamaska	February 11–12, 1874	Charles-Ignace Gill	Conservative	Joseph Nestor Duguay	Conservative	Resignation to contest the 1874 federal election	Yes
Montmorency	February 10–11, 1874	Joseph-Édouard Cauchon	Conservative	Auguste-Réal Angers	Conservative	Resignation upon abolition of the dual mandate	Yes
Montréal Centre	February 6, 1874†	Luther Hamilton Holton	Liberal	Charles Alexander	Liberal	Resignation upon abolition of the dual mandate	Yes
Montmagny	December 16, 1873	Télesphore Fournier	Liberal	François Langelier	Liberal	Resignation following appointment to the federal cabinet	Yes
Montréal Ouest	August 22, 1873	Francis Cassidy	Conservative	John Wait McGauvran	Conservative	Death	Yes
Beauharnois	July 12, 1873	George-Étienne Cartier	Conservative	Élie-Hercule Bisson	Liberal	Death	No
Gaspé	April 7, 1873†	Pierre-Étienne Fortin	Conservative	Pierre-Étienne Fortin	Conservative	Sought re-election upon appointment as Commissioner of Crown Lands	Yes
Québec-Comté	March 21, 1873†	Pierre-Joseph-Olivier Chauveau	Conservative	Pierre Garneau	Conservative	Appointed to the Senate	Yes
Terrebonne	March 12, 1873†	Joseph-Adolphe Chapleau	Conservative	Joseph-Adolphe Chapleau	Conservative	Sought re-election upon appointment as Solicitor General	Yes
Québec-Est	March 3–4, 1873	Jacques-Philippe Rhéaume	Conservative	Charles Alphonse Pantaléon Pelletier	Liberal	Appointed an agent for the Seigneurial Commission	No
Montmorency	December 23, 1872†	Joseph-Édouard Cauchon	Conservative	Joseph-Édouard Cauchon	Conservative	Sought re-election due to a scandal involving an asylum in Beauport	Yes
Rimouski	April 29, 1872	Louis Honoré Gosselin	Conservative	Alexandre Chauveau	Conservative	Resignation	Yes

† Won by acclamation

== 1st Legislative Assembly of Quebec 1867–1871 ==
By-election	Date	Incumbent	Party	Winner	Party	Cause	Retained
Napierville	October 11, 1870†	Pierre Benoit	Liberal	Laurent-David Lafontaine	Liberal	Death	Yes
Huntingdon	November 6, 1869	Julius Scriver	Conservative	William Cantwell	Conservative	Resignation to enter federal politics	Yes
Sherbrooke	November 5, 1869†	Joseph Gibb Robertson	Conservative	Joseph Gibb Robertson	Conservative	Sought re-election upon appointment as Provincial Treasurer	Yes
Richelieu	October 29, 1869	Joseph Beaudreau	Conservative	Pierre Gélinas	Conservative	Death	Yes
Trois-Rivières	October 19, 1869	Sévère Dumoulin	Conservative	Charles-Borromée Genest	Conservative	Appointed Sheriff	Yes
Kamouraska	February 11, 1869	Vacant		Charles-François Roy	Conservative	No Election held in 1867 due to riots	N/A
Trois-Rivières	October 16, 1868†	Louis-Charles Boucher de Niverville	Conservative	Sévère Dumoulin	Conservative	Resignation to become Sheriff	Yes
Champlain	December 16, 1867†	John Jones Ross	Conservative	Jean-Charles Chapais	Conservative	Appointed to the Legislative Council	Yes

† Won by acclamation

== See also ==
- List of federal by-elections in Canada
