= 12th Quebec Legislature =

The 12th Legislative Assembly of Quebec was the provincial legislature in Quebec, Canada that existed from June 8, 1908, to May 15, 1912. The Quebec Liberal Party led by Lomer Gouin was the governing party.

== Seats per political party ==
- After the 1908 elections

Affiliation	Members
Liberal	57
Conservative	14
Ligue nationaliste canadienne	3
Total	74
Government Majority	43

== Member list ==
This was the list of members of the Legislative Assembly of Quebec that were elected in the 1908 election:

Name	Party	Riding	First elected / previously elected	No. of terms
William Alexander Weir	Liberal	Argenteuil	1897	4th term
John Hay (1910)	Liberal	Argenteuil	1910	1st term
Paul Tourigny	Liberal	Arthabaska	1900	3rd term
Frédéric-Hector Daigneault	Liberal	Bagot	1900	3rd term
Arthur Godbout	Liberal	Beauce	1902	3rd term
Arthur Plante	Conservative	Beauharnois	1898, 1908	2nd term*
Adélard Turgeon	Liberal	Bellechasse	1890	6th term
Antonin Galipeault (1909)	Liberal	Bellechasse	1909	1st term
Joseph Lafontaine	Liberal	Berthier	1904	2nd term
John Hall Kelly	Liberal	Bonaventure	1904	2nd term
William Frederick Vilas	Liberal	Brome	1906	2nd term
Maurice Perrault	Liberal	Chambly	1900	3rd term
Lesieur Desaulniers (1909)	Liberal	Chambly	1909	1st term
Pierre-Calixte Neault	Liberal	Champlain	1900	3rd term
Pierre D'Auteuil	Conservative	Charlevoix	1897, 1904	3rd term*
Hospice Dumtremble	Conservative	Châteauguay	1908	1st term
Honoré Mercier Jr. (1908)	Liberal	Châteauguay	1907, 1908	2nd term*
Honoré Petit	Liberal	Chicoutimi et Saguenay	1892	5th term
Allen Wright Girard	Conservative	Compton	1900	3rd term
Arthur Sauvé	Conservative	Deux-Montagnes	1908	1st term
Alfred Morisset	Liberal	Dorchester	1904	3rd term
Joseph Laferté	Liberal	Drummond	1901	3rd term
Louis-Jules Allard (1910)	Liberal	Drummond	1897, (Note: Yamaska) 1910	4th term*
Louis-Joseph Lemieux	Liberal	Gaspé	1904	2nd term
Joseph-Léonide Perron (1910)	Liberal	Gaspé	1910	1st term
Louis-Jérémie Décarie	Liberal	Hochelaga	1904	2nd term
William H. Walker	Liberal	Huntingdon	1900	3rd term
Joseph-Aldéric Benoît	Liberal	Iberville	1906	2nd term
Louis-Albin Theriault	Liberal	Îles-de-la-Madeleine	1906	2nd term
Philémon Cousineau	Conservative	Jacques Cartier	1908	1st term
Joseph-Mathias Tellier	Conservative	Joliette	1892	5th term
Louis-Rodolphe Roy	Liberal	Kamouraska	1897	4th term
Louis-Auguste Dupuis (1909)	Liberal	Kamouraska	1909	1st term
Theodore-Louis-Antoine Broet	Liberal	Lac St-Jean	1908	1st term
Jean-Baptiste Carbonneau (1908)	Liberal	Lac St-Jean	1908	1st term
Ésioff-Léon Patenaude	Conservative	Laprairie	1908	1st term
Walter Reed	Liberal	L'Assomption	1908	1st term
Joseph-Wenceslas Lévesque	Liberal	Laval	1908	1st term
Jean-Cléophas Blouin	Liberal	Lévis	1901	3rd term
Laetare Roy (1911)	Liberal	Lévis	1911	1st term
Joseph-Édouard Caron	Liberal	L'Islet	1902	3rd term
Joseph-Napoléon Francoeur	Liberal	Lotbinière	1908	1st term
Georges Lafontaine	Conservative	Maskinongé	1904	3rd term
Donat Caron	Liberal	Matane	1899	4th term
David Henry Pennington	Conservative	Mégantic	1908	1st term
Joseph-Jean-Baptiste Gosselin	Liberal	Missisquoi	1900	3rd term
Joseph Sylvestre	Conservative	Montcalm	1908	1st term
Armand Lavergne	Ligue nationaliste canadienne	Montmagny	1908	1st term
Louis-Alexandre Taschereau	Liberal	Montmorency	1900	3rd term
Georges-Albini Lacombe	Liberal	Montréal division no. 1	1897	4th term
Napoléon Séguin (1908)	Liberal	Montréal division no. 1	1908	1st term
Henri Bourassa	Ligue nationaliste canadienne	Montréal division no. 2	1908	1st term
Clement Robillard (1909)	Liberal	Montréal division no. 2	1909	1st term
Godfroy Langlois	Liberal	Montréal division no. 3	1904	2nd term
John Thomas Finnie	Liberal	Montréal division no. 4	1908	1st term
Charles Ernest Gault	Conservative	Montréal division no. 5	1907	2nd term
Denis Tansey	Conservative	Montréal division no. 6	1908	1st term
Michael James Walsh (1908)	Liberal	Montréal division no. 6	1904, 1908	2nd term*
Cyprien Dorris	Liberal	Napierville	1905	2nd term
Charles Ramsay Devlin	Liberal	Nicolet	1907	2nd term
Ferdinand-Ambroise Gendron	Liberal	Ottawa	1904	2nd term
Tancrède Charles Gaboury	Liberal	Pontiac	1908	1st term
Lomer Gouin	Liberal	Portneuf	1897	4th term
Cyrille Fraser Delage	Liberal	Québec-Comté	1901	3rd term
Amédée Robitaille	Liberal	Québec-Centre	1897	4th term
Eugène Leclerc (1908)	Liberal	Québec-Centre	1908	1st term
Louis-Alfred Létourneau	Liberal	Québec-Est	1908	1st term
John Charles Kaine	Liberal	Québec-Ouest	1904	2nd term
Louis-Pierre-Paul Cardin	Liberal	Richelieu	1886, 1897	6th term*
Peter Samuel George Mackenzie	Liberal	Richmond	1900	3rd term
Pierre-Émile D'Anjou	Liberal	Rimouski	1907	2nd term
Alfred Girard	Liberal	Rouville	1890, 1900	5th term*
Joseph-Edmond Robert (1908)	Liberal	Rouville	1908	1st term
Henri Bourassa	Ligue nationaliste canadienne	St. Hyacinthe	1908	1st term
Gabriel Marchand III	Liberal	St. Jean	1908	1st term
Marcellin Robert (1910)	Liberal	St. Jean	1910	1st term
Georges-Isidore Delisle	Liberal	St. Maurice	1908	1st term
Charles-Eugene Côté	Liberal	St. Sauveur	1905	2nd term
Joseph-Alphonse Langlois (1909)	Parti ouvrier	St. Sauveur	1909	1st term
Ludger-Pierre Bernard	Conservative	Shefford	1904	2nd term
Pantaléon Pelletier	Liberal	Sherbrooke	1900	3rd term
Calixte-Émile Therrien (1911)	Liberal	Sherbrooke	1911	1st term
Joseph-Octave Mousseau	Liberal	Soulanges	1904	2nd term
Prosper-Alfred Bissonnet	Liberal	Stanstead	1904	2nd term
Napoléon Dion	Liberal	Témiscouata	1900	3rd term
Jean Prévost	Liberal	Terrebonne	1900	3rd term
Joseph-Adolphe Tessier	Liberal	Trois-Rivières	1904	2nd term
Hormisdas Pilon	Liberal	Vaudreuil	1901	3rd term
Amédée Geoffrion	Liberal	Verchères	1908	1st term
Napoléon-Pierre Tanguay	Liberal	Wolfe	1904	2nd term
Guillaume-Édouard Ouellette	Liberal	Yamaska	1905	2nd term

== Other elected MLAs ==
Other MLAs were elected in this mandate during by-elections

- Jean-Baptiste Carbonneau, Quebec Liberal Party, Lac St-Jean, October 14, 1908
- Joseph-Edmond Robert, Quebec Liberal Party, Rouville, October 26, 1908
- Napoléon Séguin, Quebec Liberal Party, Montréal division no. 1, December 21, 1908
- Honoré Mercier Jr., Quebec Liberal Party, Châteauguay, December 28, 1908
- Michael James Walsh, Quebec Liberal Party, Montréal division no. 6, December 28, 1908
- Eugène Leclerc, Quebec Liberal Party, Québec Centre, December 28, 1908
- Antonin Galipeault, Quebec Liberal Party, Bellechasse, February 2, 1909
- Lesieur Desaulniers, Quebec Liberal Party, Chambly, November 12, 1909
- Clement Robillard, Quebec Liberal Party, Montréal division no. 2, November 12, 1909
- Joseph-Alphonse Langlois, Parti ouvrier, St. Sauveur, November 12, 1909
- Louis-Auguste Dupuis, Quebec Liberal Party, Kamouraska, December 6, 1909
- Joseph-Léonide Perron, Quebec Liberal Party, Gaspé, February 17, 1910
- John Hay, Quebec Liberal Party, Argenteuil, March 5, 1910
- Louis-Jules Allard, Quebec Liberal Party, Drummond, March 5, 1910
- Marcellin Robert, Quebec Liberal Party, St. Jean, December 29, 1910
- Calixte-Émile Therrien, Quebec Liberal Party, Sherbrooke, August 17, 1911
- Laetare Roy, Quebec Liberal Party, Lévis, September 21, 1911

== Cabinet Ministers ==
- Prime Minister and Executive Council President: Lomer Gouin
- Agriculture: Jules Allard (1908–1909), Jérémie-Louis Décarie (1909), Joseph-Edouard Caron (1909–1912)
- Colonisation, Mines and Fishing: Charles Devlin Ramsey
- Public Works and Labor: Louis-Alexandre Taschereau
- Lands and Forests: Adélard Turgeon (1908–1909), Jules Allard (1909–1912)
- Roads: Joseph-Édouard Caron (1912)
- Attorney General:Lomer Gouin
- Provincial secretary: Louis-Rodolphe Roy (1908–1909), Louis-Jérémie Décarie (1909–1912)
- Treasurer: William Alexander Weir (1908–1910), Peter Samuel George MacKenzie (1910–1912)
- Members without portfolios: Joseph-Édouard Caron (1909), Narcisse Pérodeau (1910–1912)

== New electoral districts ==
The electoral map was reformed in 1912 just a few months prior to the general elections later that year.

- Chicoutimi was formed after being split from Saguenay which itself merged with Charlevoix to form Charlevoix—Saguenay (provincial electoral district).
- Frontenac was formed from parts of Beauce and Compton
- Labelle was formed from parts of Ottawa
- Hochelaga was split into five new districts : Maisonneuve, Montréal-Hochelaga, Westmount, Montréal-Laurier and Montréal-Dorion.
- Montréal division no. 6 was renamed Montréal–Sainte-Anne.
- Montréal division no. 1 was renamed Montréal–Sainte-Marie.
- Montréal division no. 5 was renamed Montréal–Saint-Georges.
- Montréal division no. 2 was renamed Montréal–Saint-Jacques.
- Montréal division no. 4 was renamed Montréal–Saint-Laurent.
- Montréal division no. 3 was renamed Montréal–Saint-Louis.
- Témiscamingue was created from parts of Pontiac.
