= 11th Quebec Legislature =

The 11th Legislative Assembly of Quebec was the provincial legislature in Quebec, Canada that existed from November 25, 1904 to June 8, 1908. The Quebec Liberal Party led by Simon-Napoléon Parent and Lomer Gouin was the governing party. Gouin replaced Parent in early 1905.

== Seats per political party ==
- After the 1904 elections

Affiliation	Members
Liberal	68
Conservative	6
Total	74
Government Majority	62

== Member list ==
This was the list of members of the Legislative Assembly of Quebec that were elected in the 1904 election:

Name	Party	Riding	First elected / previously elected	No. of terms
William Alexander Weir	Liberal	Argenteuil	1897	3rd term
Paul Tourigny	Liberal	Arthabaska	1900	2nd term
Frédéric-Hector Daigneault	Liberal	Bagot	1900	2nd term
Arthur Godbout	Liberal	Beauce	1902	2nd term
Achille Bergevin	Liberal	Beauharnois	1900	2nd term
Adélard Turgeon	Liberal	Bellechasse	1890	5th term
Joseph Lafontaine	Liberal	Berthier	1904	2nd term
John Hall Kelly	Liberal	Bonaventure	1904	1st term
James Sarsfield McCorkill	Liberal	Brome	1897, (Note: Missisquoi) 1903	3rd term*
William Frederick Vilas (1906)	Liberal	Brome	1906	1st term
Maurice Perrault	Liberal	Chambly	1900	2nd term
Pierre-Calixte Neault	Liberal	Champlain	1900	2nd term
Pierre D'Auteuil	Conservative	Charlevoix	1897, 1904	2nd term*
François-Xavier Dupuis	Liberal	Châteauguay	1900	2nd term
Honoré Mercier Jr. (1907)	Liberal	Châteauguay	1907	1st term
Honoré Petit	Liberal	Chicoutimi et Saguenay	1892	4th term
Allen Wright Girard	Conservative	Compton	1900	2nd term
Hector Champagne	Liberal	Deux-Montagnes	1897	3rd term
Alfred Morisset	Liberal	Dorchester	1904	1st term
Joseph Laferté	Liberal	Drummond	1901	2nd term
Louis-Joseph Lemieux	Liberal	Gaspé	1904	1st term
Jérémie-Louis Décarie	Liberal	Hochelaga	1904	1st term
William H. Walker	Liberal	Huntingdon	1900	2nd term
François Gosselin	Liberal	Iberville	1890	5th term
Joseph-Aldéric Benoit (1906)	Liberal	Iberville	1906	1st term
Robert Jamieson Leslie	Liberal	Îles-de-la-Madeleine	1904	1st term
Louis-Albin Thériault (1906)	Liberal	Îles-de-la-Madeleine	1906	1st term
Joseph-Adolphe Chauret	Liberal	Jacques Cartier	1897	3rd term
Joseph-Mathias Tellier	Conservative	Joliette	1892	4th term
Louis-Rodolphe Roy	Liberal	Kamouraska	1897	3rd term
Georges Tanguay	Liberal	Lac St-Jean	1900	2nd term
Côme-Séraphin Cherrier	Liberal	Laprairie	1897	3rd term
Joseph-Edouard Duhamel	Liberal	L'Assomption	1900	2nd term
Louis-Joseph Gauthier (1906)	Liberal	L'Assomption	1906	1st term
Pierre-Évariste Leblanc	Conservative	Laval	1882, 1884	8th term*
Jean-Cléophas Blouin	Liberal	Lévis	1901	2nd term
Joseph-Édouard Caron	Liberal	L'Islet	1902	2nd term
Napoléon Lemay	Liberal	Lotbinière	1900 (Note: First Elected as a Conservative)	2nd term
Georges Lafontaine	Conservative	Maskinongé	1904	2nd term
Donat Caron	Liberal	Matane	1899	3rd term
George Robert Smith	Liberal	Mégantic	1897	3rd term
Joseph-Jean-Baptiste Gosselin	Liberal	Missisquoi	1900	2nd term
Pierre-Julien-Leonidas Bissonnette	Liberal	Montcalm	1897	3rd term
Ernest Roy	Liberal	Montmagny	1900	2nd term
Louis-Alexandre Taschereau	Liberal	Montmorency	1900	2nd term
Georges-Albini Lacombe	Liberal	Montréal division no. 1	1897	3rd term
Lomer Gouin	Liberal	Montréal division no. 2	1897	3rd term
Godfroy Langlois	Liberal	Montréal division no. 3	1904	1st term
James Cochrane	Liberal	Montréal division no. 4	1900	2nd term
George Washington Stephens, Jr. (1905)	Liberal	Montréal division no. 4	1905	1st term
Christopher Benfield Carter	Liberal	Montréal division no. 5	1904	1st term
Charles Ernest Gault (1907)	Conservative	Montréal division no. 5	1907	1st term
Michael James Walsh	Liberal	Montréal division no. 6	1904	1st term
Dominique Monet	Liberal	Napierville	1904	1st term
Cyprien Dorris (1905)	Liberal	Napierville	1905	1st term
Alfred Marchildon	Liberal	Nicolet	1904	1st term
Charles Ramsey Devlin (1907)	Liberal	Nicolet	1907	1st term
Ferdinand-Ambroise Gendron	Liberal	Ottawa	1904	1st term
David Gillies	Liberal	Pontiac	1892	4th term
Édouard-Antill Panet	Liberal	Portneuf	1904	1st term
Cyrille-Fraser Delâge	Liberal	Québec-Comté	1901	2nd term
Amédée Robitaille	Liberal	Québec-Centre	1897	3rd term
Albert Jobin	Liberal	Québec-Est	1904	1st term
John Charles Kaine	Liberal	Québec-Ouest	1904	1st term
Louis-Pierre-Paul Cardin	Liberal	Richelieu	1886, 1897	5th term*
Peter Samuel George Mackenzie	Liberal	Richmond	1900	2nd term
Auguste Tessier	Liberal	Rimouski	1889	6th term
Pierre-Émile D'Anjou (1907)	Liberal	Rimouski	1907	1st term
Alfred Girard	Liberal	Rouville	1890, 1900	4th term*
Joseph Morin	Liberal	St. Hyacinthe	1900	2nd term
Philippe-Honoré Roy	Liberal	St. Jean	1900	2nd term
Louis-Philippe Fiset	Liberal	St. Maurice	1900	2nd term
Simon-Napoléon Parent	Liberal	St. Sauveur	1890	5th term
Charles-Eugène Côté (1905)	Liberal	St. Sauveur	1905	1st term
Ludger-Pierre Bernard	Conservative	Shefford	1904	1st term
Pantaléon Pelletier	Liberal	Sherbrooke	1900	2nd term
Joseph-Octave Mousseau	Liberal	Soulanges	1904	1st term
Prosper-Alfred Bissonnet	Liberal	Stanstead	1904	1st term
Napoléon Dion	Liberal	Témiscouata	1900	2nd term
Jean Prévost	Liberal	Terrebonne	1900	2nd term
Joseph-Adolphe Tessier	Liberal	Trois-Rivières	1904	1st term
Hormisdas Pilon	Liberal	Vaudreuil	1901	2nd term
Étienne Blanchard	Liberal	Verchères	1897	3rd term
Napoléon-Pierre Tanguay	Liberal	Wolfe	1904	1st term
Louis-Jules Allard	Liberal	Yamaska	1897	3rd term
Guillaume-Édouard Ouellet (1905)	Liberal	Yamaska	1905	1st term

== Other elected MLAs ==
Other MLAs were elected during this mandate in by-elections

- Guillaume-Édouard Ouellet, Quebec Liberal Party, Yamaska, June 20, 1905
- George Washington Stephens Jr., Quebec Liberal Party, Montreal division no. 4, October 7, 1905
- Cyprien Dorris, Quebec Liberal Party, Napierville, December 14, 1905
- Charles-Eugène Côté, Quebec Liberal Party, St. Sauveur, October 14, 1905
- William Frederick Vilas, Quebec Liberal Party, Brome, September 10, 1906
- Louis-Joseph Gauthier, Quebec Liberal Party, L'Assomption, October 29, 1906
- Joseph-Aldéric Benoit, Quebec Liberal Party, Iberville, November 5, 1906
- Louis-Albin Thériault, Quebec Liberal Party, Iles de la Madeleine, November 20, 1906
- Charles Ernest Gault, Quebec Conservative Party, Montréal division no.5, January 24, 1907
- Charles Ramsey Devlin, Quebec Liberal Party, Nicolet, November 4, 1907
- Pierre-Émile D'Anjou, Quebec Liberal Party, Rimouski, November 4, 1907
- Honoré Mercier Jr., Quebec Liberal Party, Châteauguay, December 16, 1907

== Cabinet Ministers ==
=== Parent Cabinet (1904-1905) ===
- Prime Minister and Executive Council President: Simon-Napoleon Parent
- Agriculture: Adélard Turgeon (1904-1905), Némèse Garneau (1905)
- Colonization and Public Works: Lomer Gouin
- Lands, Mines and Fishing: Simon-Napoleon Parent
- Attorney General:Horace Archambault
- Provincial secretary: Amédée Robitaille
- Treasurer: John Charles McCorkill
- Members without portfolios, George Washington Stephens, James John Guerin, William Alexander Weir, Dominique Monet (1905)

=== Gouin Cabinet (1905-1908) ===
- Prime Minister and Executive Council President: Lomer Gouin
- Agriculture: Auguste Tessier (1905-1906), Jules Allard (1906-1908)
- Colonization and Public Works: Jules Allard (1905)
- Lands, Mines and Fishing: Adélard Turgeon (1905)
  - Colonisation, Mines and Fishing: Jean Prevost (1905-1907), Lomer Gouin (1907), Charles Devlin Ramsey (1907-1908)
  - Public Works and Labor: Jules Allard (1905-1906), William Alexandre Weir (1906-1907), Louis-Alexandre Taschereau (1907-1908)
  - Lands and Forests: Adélard Turgeon (1905-1908)
- Attorney General:Lomer Gouin
- Provincial secretary: Louis-Rodolphe Roy
- Treasurer: John Charles McCorkill (1905-1906), Auguste Tessier (1906-1907), William Alexander Weir (1907-1908)
- Members without portfolios: William Alexander Weir (1905-1906), John Charles Kaine (1906-1908)
