= 10th Quebec Legislature =

The 10th Legislative Assembly of Quebec was the provincial legislature in Quebec, Canada that existed from December 7, 1900, to November 25, 1904. The Quebec Liberal Party led by Simon-Napoléon Parent was the governing party.

== Seats per political party ==
- After the 1900 elections

Affiliation	Members
Liberal	67
Conservative	7
Total	74
Government Majority	60

== Member list ==
This was the list of members of the Legislative Assembly of Quebec that were elected in the 1900 election:

Name	Party	Riding	First elected / previously elected	No. of terms
William Alexander Weir	Liberal	Argenteuil	1897	2nd term
Paul Tourigny	Liberal	Arthabaska	1900	1st term
Frédéric-Hector Daigneault	Liberal	Bagot	1900	1st term
Henri-Séverin Béland	Liberal	Beauce	1897	2nd term
Arthur Godbout (1902)	Liberal	Beauce	1902	1st term
Achille Bergevin	Liberal	Beauharnois	1900	1st term
Adélard Turgeon	Liberal	Bellechasse	1890	4th term
Cuthbert-Alphonse Chenevert	Liberal	Berthier	1890, 1897	3rd term*
Joseph Lafontaine (1904)	Liberal	Berthier	1904	1st term
William Henry Clapperton	Liberal	Bonaventure	1897	2nd term
Henry Thomas Duffy	Liberal	Brome	1897	2nd term
James Sarsfield McCorkill (1903)	Liberal	Brome	1897, (Note: Missisquoi) 1903	2nd term*
Maurice Perrault	Liberal	Chambly	1900	1st term
Pierre-Calixte Neault	Liberal	Champlain	1900	1st term
Joseph Morin	Liberal	Charlevoix	1886, 1900	4th term*
François-Xavier Dupuis	Liberal	Châteauguay	1900	1st term
Honoré Petit	Liberal	Chicoutimi et Saguenay	1892	3rd term
Allen Wright Giard	Conservative	Compton	1900	1st term
Hector Champagne	Liberal	Deux-Montagnes	1897	2nd term
Louis-Philippe Pelletier	Conservative	Dorchester	1888	5th term
William John Watts	Liberal	Drummond	1874, 1890, 1897	7th term*
Joseph Laferté (1901)	Liberal	Drummond	1901	1st term
Xavier Kennedy	Liberal	Gaspé	1900	1st term
Daniel-Jérémie Décarie	Liberal	Hochelaga	1897	2nd term
William H. Walker	Liberal	Huntingdon	1900	1st term
François Gosselin	Liberal	Iberville	1890	4th term
Patrick Peter Delaney	Liberal	Îles-de-la-Madeleine	1897	2nd term
Joseph-Adolphe Chauret	Liberal	Jacques Cartier	1897	2nd term
Joseph-Mathias Tellier	Conservative	Joliette	1892	3rd term
Louis-Rodolphe Roy	Liberal	Kamouraska	1897	2nd term
Georges Tanguay	Liberal	Lac St-Jean	1900	1st term
Côme-Séraphin Cherrier	Liberal	Laprairie	1897	2nd term
Joseph-Édouard Duhamel	Liberal	L'Assomption	1900	1st term
Pierre-Évariste Leblanc	Conservative	Laval	1882, 1884	7th term*
Charles Langelier	Liberal	Lévis	1898	2nd term
Jean-Cléophas Blouin (1901)	Liberal	Lévis	1901	1st term
Francois-Gilbert Miville Dechêne	Liberal	L'Islet	1886	5th term
Joseph-Édouard Caron (1902)	Liberal	L'Islet	1902	1st term
Napoléon Lemay	Conservative	Lotbinière	1900	1st term
Napoléon Lemay	Liberal	Lotbinière	1900	1st term
Hector Caron	Liberal	Maskinongé	1892	3rd term
Georges Lafontaine (1904)	Conservative	Maskinongé	1904	1st term
Donat Caron	Liberal	Matane	1899	2nd term
George Robert Smith	Liberal	Mégantic	1897	2nd term
Joseph-Jean-Baptiste Gosselin	Liberal	Missisquoi	1900	1st term
Pierre-Julien-Léonidas Bissonnette	Liberal	Montcalm	1897	2nd term
Ernest Roy	Liberal	Montmagny	1900	1st term
Louis-Alexandre Taschereau	Liberal	Montmorency	1900	1st term
Georges-Albini Lacombe	Liberal	Montréal division no. 1	1897	2nd term
Lomer Gouin	Liberal	Montréal division no. 2	1897	2nd term
Henri-Benjamin Rainville	Liberal	Montréal division no. 3	1890, 1897	3rd term*
James Cochrane	Liberal	Montréal division no. 4	1900	1st term
Matthew Hutchinson	Liberal	Montréal division no. 5	1900	1st term
James John Edmond Guérin	Liberal	Montréal division no. 6	1895	3rd term
Dominique Monet	Liberal	Napierville	1897	2nd term
Edmund James Flynn	Conservative	Nicolet	1875, (Note: Gaspé) 1892	6th term*
Charles Beautron Major	Liberal	Ottawa	1897	2nd term
David Gillies	Liberal	Pontiac	1892	3rd term
Jules Tessier	Liberal	Portneuf	1886	5th term
Damase-Épiphane Naud (1904)	Conservative	Portneuf	1904	1st term
Némèse Garneau	Liberal	Québec-Comté	1897	2nd term
Cyrille-Fraser Delâge (1901)	Liberal	Québec-Comté	1901	1st term
Amédée Robitaille	Liberal	Québec-Centre	1897	2nd term
Jules-Alfred Lane	Liberal	Québec-Est	1900	1st term
John Gabriel Hearn	Liberal	Québec-Ouest	1900	1st term
Louis-Pierre-Paul Cardin	Liberal	Richelieu	1886, 1897	4th term*
Peter Samuel George Mackenzie	Liberal	Richmond	1900	1st term
Auguste Tessier	Liberal	Rimouski	1889	5th term
Alfred Girard	Liberal	Rouville	1890, 1900	3rd term*
Joseph Morin	Liberal	St. Hyacinthe	1900	1st term
Philippe-Honoré Roy	Liberal	St. Jean	1900	1st term
Louis-Philippe Fiset	Liberal	St. Maurice	1900	1st term
Simon-Napoléon Parent	Liberal	St. Sauveur	1890	4th term
Tancrède Boucher de Grandbois	Liberal	Shefford	1888, 1897	4th term*
Auguste Mathieu (1904)	Liberal	Shefford	1904	1st term
Pantaléon Pelletier	Liberal	Sherbrooke	1900	1st term
Avila-Gonzague Bourbonnais	Liberal	Soulanges	1886	5th term
Arcand-Momer Bissonnette (1902)	Conservative	Soulanges	1902	1st term
Moodie Brock Lovell	Liberal	Stanstead	1890, 1900	2nd term*
Georges-Henri Saint-Pierre (1902)	Conservative	Stanstead	1902	1st term
Napoléon Dion	Liberal	Témiscouata	1900	1st term
Jean Prévost	Liberal	Terrebonne	1900	1st term
Richard-Stanislas Cooke	Liberal	Trois-Rivières	1900	1st term
Émery Lalonde, Jr.	Liberal	Vaudreuil	1890, 1897	3rd term*
Hormidas Pilon (1901)	Liberal	Vaudreuil	1901	1st term
Étienne Blanchard	Liberal	Verchères	1897	2nd term
Jérôme-Adolphe Chicoyne	Conservative	Wolfe	1892	3rd term
Louis-Jules Allard	Liberal	Yamaska	1897	2nd term

== Other elected MLAs ==
Other MLAs were elected during this term in by-elections

- Jean-Cléophas Blouin, Quebec Liberal Party, Lévis, October 24, 1901
- Joseph Laferté, Quebec Liberal Party, Drummond, October 31, 1901
- Cyrille Fraser Delage, Quebec Liberal Party, Québec, October 31, 1901
- Hormidas Pilon, Quebec Liberal Party, Vaudreuil, October 31, 1901
- Arthur Godbout, Quebec Liberal Party, Beauce, January 31, 1902
- Joseph-Édouard Caron, Quebec Liberal Party, L'Islet, September 26, 1902
- Arcand-Momer Bissonnette, Quebec Conservative Party, Soulanges, October 3, 1902
- James Sarsfield McCorkill, Quebec Liberal Party, Brome, October 29, 1903
- Joseph Lafontaine, Quebec Liberal Party, Berthier, March 10, 1904
- Georges Lafontaine, Quebec Conservative Party, Maskinongé, March 10, 1904
- Damase-Épiphane Naud, Quebec Conservative Party, Portneuf, March 10, 1904
- Auguste Mathieu, Quebec Liberal Party, Shefford, March 10, 1904

== Cabinet Ministers ==
- Prime Minister and Executive Council President: Simon-Napoleon Parent
- Agriculture: François-Gilbert Miville Dechêne (1900-1902), Adelard Turgeon (1902-1904)
- Colonization and Mines: Adélard Turgeon (1900-1901)
- Public Works: Lomer Gouin (1900-1901)
  - Colonization and Public Works: Lomer Gouin (1901-1904)
- Lands, Forests and Fishing: Simon-Napoléon Parent (1900-1901)
  - Lands, Mines and Fishing: Simon-Napoleon Parent (1901-1904)
- Attorney General:Horace Archambault
- Provincial secretary: Adélard Turgeon (1901-1902), Amédée Robitaille (1902-1904)
- Treasurer: Henry Thomas Duffy (1900-1903), Simon-Napoleon Parent (1903), John Charles McCorkill (1903-1904)
- Members without portfolios, George Washington Stephens, James John Guerin, William Alexander Weir (1903-1904)
