= 13th Quebec Legislature =

The 13th Legislative Assembly of Quebec was the provincial legislature in Quebec, Canada that existed from May 15, 1912, to May 22, 1916. The Quebec Liberal Party led by Lomer Gouin was the governing party.

== Seats per political party ==
- After the 1912 elections

| Affiliation | Members |
|---|---|
| Liberal | 62 |
| Conservative | 16 |
| Liberal Independent | 1 |
| Parti ouvrier | 1 |
| Ligue nationaliste canadienne | 1 |
| Total | 81 |
| Government Majority | 46 |

== Member list ==
This was the list of members of the Legislative Assembly of Quebec that were elected in the 1912 election:

| Name | Party | Riding | First elected / previously elected | No. of terms |
|---|---|---|---|---|
| Harry Slater | Conservative | Argenteuil | 1912 | 1st term |
| Paul Tourigny | Liberal | Arthabaska | 1900 | 4th term |
| Frédéric-Hector Daigneault | Liberal | Bagot | 1900 | 4th term |
| Joseph-Émery Phaneuf (1913) | Liberal | Bagot | 1913 | 1st term |
| Arthur Godbout | Liberal | Beauce | 1902 | 4th term |
| Edmond Arthur Robert | Liberal | Beauharnois | 1912 | 1st term |
| Antonin Galipeault | Liberal | Bellechasse | 1909 | 2nd term |
| Joseph-Olivier Gadoury | Conservative | Berthier | 1912 | 1st term |
| John Hall Kelly | Liberal | Bonaventure | 1904 | 3rd term |
| Joseph-Fabien Bugeaud (1914) | Liberal | Bonaventure | 1914 | 1st term |
| William Frederick Vilas | Liberal | Brome | 1906 | 3rd term |
| Eugène Merril Lesieur Desaulniers | Liberal | Chambly | 1909 | 2nd term |
| Joseph-Arthur Labissonnière | Conservative | Champlain | 1912 | 1st term |
| Pierre D'Auteuil | Conservative | Charlevoix et Saguenay | 1897, 1904 | 4th term* |
| Honoré Mercier Jr. | Liberal | Châteauguay | 1907, 1908 | 3rd term* |
| Honoré Petit | Liberal | Chicoutimi | 1892 | 6th term |
| George Nathaniel Scott | Liberal | Compton | 1912 | 1st term |
| Arthur Sauvé | Conservative | Deux-Montagnes | 1908 | 2nd term |
| Alfred Morisset | Liberal | Dorchester | 1904 | 4th term |
| Lucien Cannon (1913) | Liberal | Dorchester | 1913 | 1st term |
| Jules Allard | Liberal | Drummond | 1897, (Note: Yamaska) 1910 | 5th term* |
| Georges-Stanislas Grégoire | Liberal | Frontenac | 1912 | 1st term |
| Gustave Lemieux | Liberal | Gaspé | 1912 | 1st term |
| William H. Walker | Liberal | Huntingdon | 1900 | 4th term |
| Andrew Philps (1913) | Liberal | Huntingdon | 1913 | 1st term |
| Joseph-Aldéric Benoît | Liberal | Iberville | 1906 | 3rd term |
| Joseph-Édouard Caron | Liberal | Îles-de-la-Madeleine | 1902 | 4th term |
| Philémon Cousineau | Conservative | Jacques-Cartier | 1908 | 2nd term |
| Joseph-Mathias Tellier | Conservative | Joliette | 1892 | 6th term |
| Charles-Adolphe Stein | Liberal | Kamouraska | 1912 | 1st term |
| Hyacinthe-Adélard Fortier | Liberal | Labelle | 1912 | 1st term |
| Jean-Baptiste Carbonneau | Liberal | Lac-Saint-Jean | 1908 | 2nd term |
| Ésioff-Léon Patenaude | Conservative | Laprairie | 1908 | 2nd term |
| Walter Reed | Liberal | L'Assomption | 1908 | 2nd term |
| Joseph-Wenceslas Lévesque | Liberal | Laval | 1908 | 2nd term |
| Alphonse Bernier | Conservative | Lévis | 1912 | 1st term |
| Joseph-Octave Morin | Conservative | L'Islet | 1912 | 1st term |
| Joseph-Napoléon Francoeur | Liberal | Lotbinière | 1908 | 2nd term |
| Jérémie-Louis Décarie | Liberal | Maisonneuve | 1904 | 3rd term |
| Rodolphe Tourville | Liberal | Maskinongé | 1912 | 1st term |
| Donat Caron | Liberal | Matane | 1899 | 5th term |
| Joseph Demers | Liberal | Mégantic | 1912 | 1st term |
| Joseph-Jean-Baptiste Gosselin | Liberal | Missisquoi | 1900 | 4th term |
| Joseph Sylvestre | Conservative | Montcalm | 1908 | 2nd term |
| Armand Lavergne | Ligue nationaliste canadienne | Montmagny | 1908 | 2nd term |
| Louis-Alexandre Taschereau | Liberal | Montmorency | 1900 | 4th term |
| Georges Mayrand | Liberal | Montréal-Dorion | 1912 | 1st term |
| Séverin Létourneau | Liberal | Montréal-Hochelaga | 1912 | 1st term |
| Napoléon Turcot | Liberal | Montréal-Laurier | 1912 | 1st term |
| Denis Tansey | Conservative | Montréal–Sainte-Anne | 1908, 1912 | 2nd term* |
| Napoléon Séguin | Liberal | Montréal–Sainte-Marie | 1908 | 2nd term |
| Charles Ernest Gault | Conservative | Montréal–Saint-Georges | 1907 | 3rd term |
| Clément Robillard | Liberal | Montréal–Saint-Jacques | 1909 | 2nd term |
| John Thomas Finnie | Liberal | Montréal–Saint-Laurent | 1908 | 2nd term |
| Godfroy Langlois | Liberal | Montréal–Saint-Louis | 1904 | 3rd term |
| Cyprien Doris | Liberal | Napierville | 1905 | 3rd term |
| Charles Ramsay Devlin | Liberal | Nicolet | 1907 | 3rd term |
| Arthur Trahan (1913) | Liberal | Nicolet | 1913 | 1st term |
| Ferdinand-Ambroise Gendron | Liberal | Ottawa | 1904 | 3rd term |
| George Benjamin Campbell | Conservative | Pontiac | 1912 | 1st term |
| Lomer Gouin | Liberal | Portneuf | 1897 | 5th term |
| Cyrille Fraser Delage | Liberal | Québec-Comté | 1901 | 4th term |
| Eugène Leclerc | Liberal | Québec-Centre | 1908 | 2nd term |
| Louis-Alfred Létourneau | Liberal | Québec-Est | 1908 | 2nd term |
| John Charles Kaine | Liberal | Québec-Ouest | 1904 | 3rd term |
| Maurice-Louis Péloquin | Liberal | Richelieu | 1912 | 1st term |
| Peter Samuel George Mackenzie | Liberal | Richmond | 1900 | 4th term |
| Walter George Mitchell (1914) | Liberal | Richmond | 1914 | 1st term |
| Auguste-Maurice Tessier | Liberal | Rimouski | 1912 | 1st term |
| Joseph-Edmond Robert | Liberal | Rouville | 1908 | 2nd term |
| Télesphore-Damien Bouchard | Liberal | Saint-Hyacinthe | 1912 | 1st term |
| Lomer Gouin | Liberal | Saint-Jean | 1897 | 5th term |
| Marcellin Robert (1913) | Liberal | Saint-Jean | 1913 | 1st term |
| Georges-Isidore Delisle | Liberal | Saint-Maurice | 1908 | 2nd term |
| Joseph-Alphonse Langlois | Parti ouvrier | Saint-Sauveur | 1909 | 2nd term |
| William Stephen Bullock | Liberal | Shefford | 1912 | 1st term |
| Calixte-Émile Therrien | Liberal | Sherbrooke | 1911 | 2nd term |
| Joseph-Octave Mousseau | Liberal | Soulanges | 1904 | 3rd term |
| Prosper-Alfred Bissonnet | Liberal | Stanstead | 1904 | 3rd term |
| Alfred-Joseph Bissonnett (1913) | Liberal | Stanstead | 1913 | 1st term |
| Charles Ramsay Devlin | Liberal | Témiscaming | 1907 | 3rd term |
| Léo Bérubé | Conservative | Témiscouata | 1912 | 1st term |
| Jean Prévost | Liberal Independent | Terrebonne | 1900 | 4th term |
| Joseph-Adolphe Tessier | Liberal | Trois-Rivières | 1904 | 3rd term |
| Hormisdas Pilon | Liberal | Vaudreuil | 1901 | 4th term |
| Amédée Geoffrion | Liberal | Verchères | 1908 | 2nd term |
| Joseph-Léonide Perron (1912) | Liberal | Verchères | 1910, (Note: Gaspé) 1912 | 2nd term* |
| Charles Allan Smart | Conservative | Westmount | 1912 | 1st term |
| Napoléon-Pierre Tanguay | Liberal | Wolfe | 1904 | 3rd term |
| Guillaume-Édouard Ouellette | Liberal | Yamaska | 1905 | 3rd term |

== Other elected MLAs ==
- Joseph-Léonide Perron, Quebec Liberal Party, Verchères, October 16, 1912
- Joseph-Émery Phaneuf, Quebec Liberal Party, Bagot, January 16, 1913
- Alfred-Joseph Bissonnett, Quebec Liberal Party, Stanstead, January 16, 1913
- Lucien Cannon, Quebec Liberal Party, Dorchester, June 2, 1913
- Arthur Trahan, Quebec Liberal Party, Nicolet, June 2, 1913
- Andrew Philps, Quebec Liberal Party, Huntingdon, November 10, 1913
- Marcellin Robert, Quebec Liberal Party, St. Jean, November 10, 1913
- Joseph-Fabien Bugeaud, Quebec Liberal Party, Bonaventure, May 7, 1914
- Walter George Mitchell, Quebec Liberal Party, Richmond, November 21, 1914

== Cabinet Ministers ==
- Prime Minister and Executive Council President: Lomer Gouin
- Agriculture: Joseph-Édouard Caron
- Colonisation, Mines and Fishing: Charles Devlin Ramsey (1912-1914), Honoré Mercier Jr. (1914-1916)
- Public Works and Labor: Louis-Alexandre Taschereau
- Lands and Forests: Jules Allard
- Roads: Joseph-Édouard Caron (1912-1914), Joseph-Adolphe Tessier (1914-1916)
- Attorney General:Lomer Gouin
- Provincial secretary: Louis-Jérémie Décarie
- Treasurer: Peter Samuel George MacKenzie (1912-1914), Walter Georges Mitchell (1914-1916)
