= William Vilas =

William Vilas may refer to:

- William Freeman Vilas, United States Senator from Wisconsin
- William Frederick Vilas, Canadian politician in Quebec
