= Olivier Robitaille =

Canadian mayor

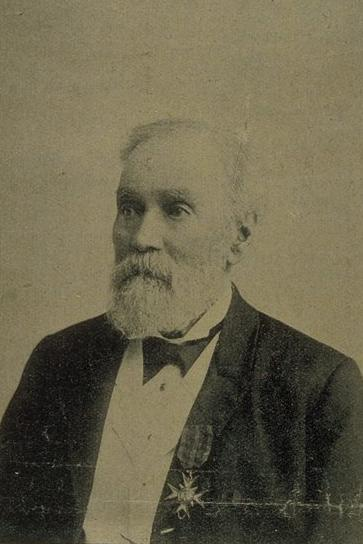
Robitaille with his Knight Cross in 1896 - taken a short time before his death.

Olivier Robitaille (December 3, 1811 – November 3, 1896) was a physician and businessman in Lower Canada. He was the 8th mayor of Quebec City from January 22, 1856 to January 19, 1857.

He was born in Quebec City in 1811, the son of carpenter Étienne Robitaille and his wife Marie Moisan. He studied at the Petit Séminaire de Québec and later trained in medicine with Joseph Morrin, working as an intern at the Marine and Emigrant Hospital. He received his doctorate degree in medicine (MD) from Harvard University in 1838, was qualified to practice in Lower Canada later that year and set up practice in Quebec City. He also served as visiting physician for the Marine and Emigrant Hospital, serving on its board, and was physician for the Quebec jail.

Although sympathetic to the Patriote cause, he did not take part in the Lower Canada Rebellion. Robitaille helped found the Société Saint-Jean-Baptiste at Quebec in 1842. On June 4, 1844, he married Zoé-Louise, the daughter of Claude Dénéchau. He was elected to city council in 1851, serving until 1856. Robitaille was selected as mayor by the members of city council in 1856; during his term in office, a bill was passed in the legislative assembly allowing citizens to elect their mayor. He helped found the Caisse d’Épargnes de Notre-Dame-de-Québec and served as its first president. Robitaille also helped found the Banque Nationale. After the death of his first wife, he married Charlotte-Adélaïde Boucher dit Verchères de Boucherville, the widow of lawyer Pierre-Adolphe-Auguste Quesnel, on October 26, 1859.

== Family ==
- By his first wife Zoé-Louise Dénéchau (Dénéchaud), he had a son: Amédée (December 31, 1852 - March 28, 1930) who married Josephine Peachy;
- By his second wife, Charlotte-Adélaïde Boucher dit Verchères de Boucherville, he had a daughter: Albertine (September 7, 1860 - January 8, 1930) who married Albert Marois.

He helped establish the Catholic newspaper Le Courrier du Canada in 1857. In 1878, he was named a knight of the Order of Saint Silvester by Pope Pius IX. He retired from his medical practice in 1883.

He died at Quebec in 1896.
