= Jean-Baptiste Couillard Dupuis =

Canadian politician

Jean-Baptiste Couillard Dupuis (August 24, 1814 – August 13, 1889) was a farmer, merchant and political figure in Quebec. He represented L'Islet in the Legislative Assembly of Quebec from 1878 to 1881 as a Liberal. His surname was "Couillard Dupuis".

He was born in Montmagny, Lower Canada, the son of Charlemagne Couillard Dupuis and Charlotte Boilard, and lived at Saint-Roch-des-Aulnaies. In 1837, he married Justine Letellier, the sister of Luc Letellier de St-Just. Couillard Dupuis was defeated when he ran for reelection in 1881. He died at Saint-Roch-des-Aulnaies at the age of 74.

His daughter Paméla married Pamphile-Gaspard Verreault, who represented L'Islet in the Quebec assembly from 1867 to 1878. His grandson Louis-Auguste Dupuis also served in the Quebec assembly.
