= Francis Edward Gilman =

Canadian politician

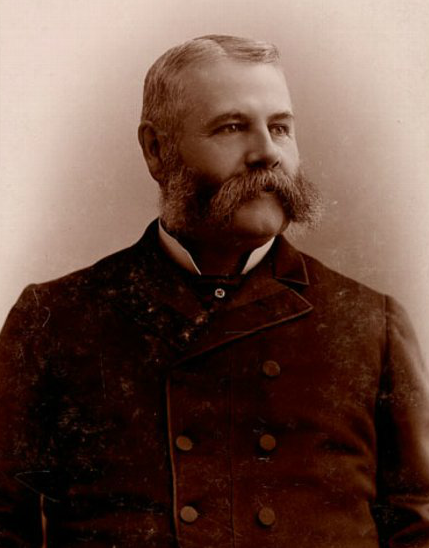

Member of the Legislative Council of Quebec for Wellington
- In office 1887–1917
- Appointed by: Joseph-Adolphe Chapleau
- Preceded by: William Hoste Webb
- Succeeded by: William Frederick Vilas

Personal details
- Born: April 11, 1842 Danville, Canada East
- Died: May 24, 1917 (aged 75) Westmount, Quebec
- Party: Liberal

Francis Edward Gilman (April 11, 1842 – May 24, 1917) was a Canadian politician.

Born in Danville, Canada East, Gilman studied at McGill University before being called to the Bar of Lower Canada in 1865. He received a Doctor of Law degree in 1877 and was created a Queen's Counsel in 1885. A lawyer, he practised law in Montreal. He ran unsuccessfully as the Liberal candidate for the Legislative Assembly of Quebec for Argenteuil in 1881 losing to William Owens. He was appointed to the Legislative Council of Quebec for Wellington in 1887. He served until his death in 1917 in Westmount, Quebec.
