= Pamphile-Gaspard Verreault =

Canadian politician

Member of the Legislative Assembly of Quebec for L'Islet
- In office 1867–1878
- Succeeded by: Jean-Baptiste Couillard Dupuis

Personal details
- Born: September 6, 1832 Saint-Jean-Port-Joli, Lower Canada
- Died: February 7, 1906 (aged 73) Saint-Jean-Port-Joli, Quebec
- Party: Conservative

Pamphile-Gaspard Verreault (September 6, 1832 – February 7, 1906) was a farmer, notary and political figure in Quebec. He represented L'Islet in the Legislative Assembly of Quebec from 1867 to 1878 as a Conservative member.

== Biography ==
He was born at Saint-Jean-Port-Joli, the son of Antoine Gaspard Verreau and Hélène Fournier. Verreault was educated there and at the Collège de Sainte-Anne-de-la-Pocatière. He qualified to practise as a notary in 1860 and practised in Saint-Jean-Port-Joli and Monmagny. In 1863, he married Paméla Couillard Dupuis, the daughter of Jean-Baptiste Couillard Dupuis. Verreault was mayor of Saint-Jean-Port-Joli from 1880 to 1893 and warden for L'Islet County from 1882 to 1893. He also helped found the Société d'horticulture de L'Islet and was a founder and secretary-treasurer of the Institut littéraire et scientifique de Saint-Jean-Port-Joli. He died in Saint-Jean-Port-Joli at the age of 73.

His nephew Louis-Auguste Dupuis also served in the Quebec assembly.

The community of Saint-Pamphile was named in his honour.
