= Elijah Edmund Spencer =

Canadian politician

Member of the Legislative Assembly of Quebec for Missisquoi
- In office 1881–1897
- Preceded by: Ernest Racicot
- Succeeded by: John Charles McCorkill

Personal details
- Born: April 19, 1846 Saint-Armand-Est (Frelighsburg), Canada East
- Died: August 7, 1919 (aged 73) Frelighsburg, Quebec
- Party: Conservative

Elijah Edmund Spencer (19 April 1846 – 7 August 1919) was a Canadian politician in the province of Quebec.

Born in Saint-Armand-Est (Frelighsburg), Canada East, the son of United Empire Loyalists Ambrose S. Spencer and Mary Thomas, Spencer was educated at the Frelighsburg Grammar School and then studied in Poughkeepsie, New York. A farmer, he was president of the Missisquoi County Agricultural Society. He was also president of the Missisquoi and Rouville Mutual Fire Insurance Company.

He was first elected to the Legislative Assembly of Quebec for the electoral district of Missisquoi in 1881. A Conservative, he was re-elected in 1886 but the election was declare invalid in 1887. He was re-elected in the resulting by-election in 1888 and again in 1890 and 1892. He was defeated in 1897. He then was a municipal councillor of Frelighsburg from 1898 to 1901 and was mayor from 1901 to 1905. He was Prefect of the county from 1902 to 1907.
