= Joseph-Édouard Caron =

Canadian politician (1866–1930)

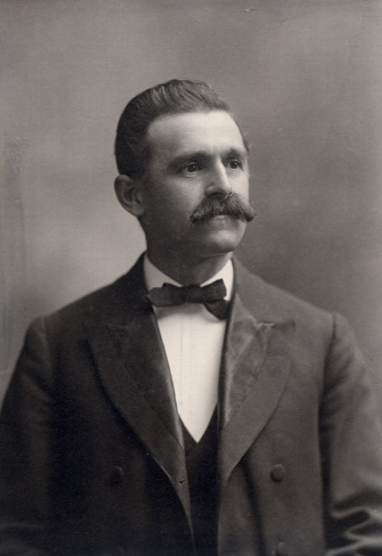

Member of the Legislative Assembly of Quebec for L'Islet
- In office 1902–1912
- Preceded by: François-Gilbert Miville Dechêne
- Succeeded by: Joseph-Octave Morin

Member of the Legislative Assembly of Quebec for Îles-de-la-Madeleine
- In office 1912–1927
- Preceded by: Louis-Albin Thériault
- Succeeded by: Amédée Caron

Member of the Legislative Council of Quebec for Kennebec
- In office 1927–1929
- Preceded by: Paul Tourigny
- Succeeded by: Élisée Thériault

Personal details
- Born: 10 January 1866 Saint-Roch-des-Aulnaies, Lower Canada
- Died: 16 July 1930 (aged 64) Quebec City, Quebec
- Party: Liberal

Joseph-Édouard Caron (10 January 1866 – 16 July 1930) was a Canadian politician.

He was a member of the 10th, 11th, 12th, 13th, 14th, 15th, 16th, and 17th Legislative Assembly of Quebec representing the ridings of L'Islet and Îles-de-la-Madeleine. From 1909 to 1929, he was the Minister of Agriculture.
