= Joseph-Édouard Fortin =

Canadian politician

Member of the Legislative Assembly of Quebec for Beauce
- In office 1929–1935
- Preceded by: Joseph-Hughes Fortier
- Succeeded by: Vital Cliche

Personal details
- Born: June 10, 1884 La Malbaie, Quebec
- Died: April 9, 1949 (aged 64) Montreal, Quebec
- Party: Liberal

Joseph-Édouard Fortin (June 10, 1884 – April 9, 1949) was a Canadian provincial politician. He was the Liberal member of the Legislative Assembly of Quebec for Beauce from 1929 to 1935. He was also mayor of Beauceville, Quebec from 1922 to 1925. His son, Carrier Fortin, was also a member of the Legislative Assembly of Quebec.
