= William Warren Lynch =

Canadian politician

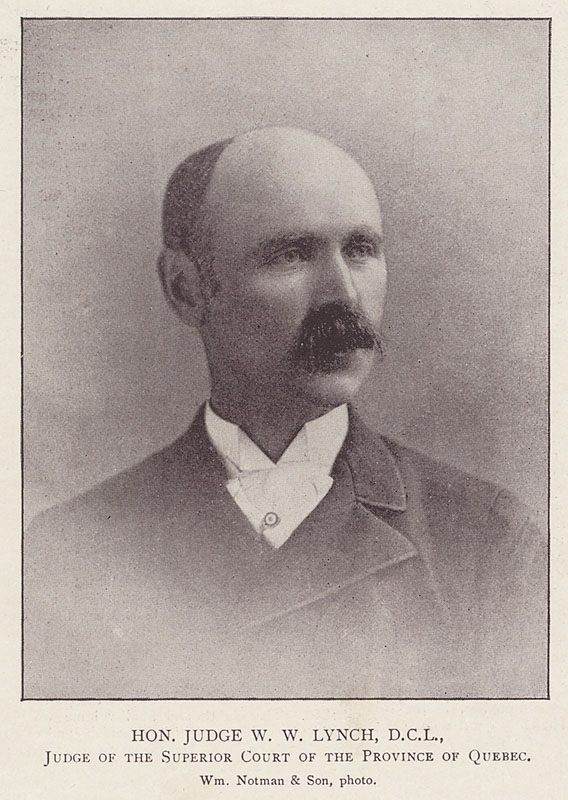

Member of the Legislative Assembly of Quebec for Brome
- In office 1871–1889
- Preceded by: Christopher Dunkin
- Succeeded by: Rufus Nelson England

Personal details
- Born: September 30, 1845 Bedford, Canada East
- Died: November 23, 1916 (aged 71) Knowlton, Quebec
- Party: Conservative

William Warren Lynch (September 30, 1845 – November 23, 1916) was a Canadian lawyer, politician, and judge in the province of Quebec.

== Biography ==
Born near the Village of Bedford, County of Missisquoi, Canada East, the son of Thomas Lynch of County Cavan and Charlotte R. Williams, Lynch attended Stanbridge Academy and entered the University of Vermont in 1861 but did not continue his studies there due to the American Civil War. In 1862, he received a scholarship from McGill University and entered the Arts course but due to his poor health he was unable to complete his studies. In 1865, he started studying law in the law office of S. W. Foster in Knowlton and later John Monk in Montreal. He received a Bachelor of Laws degree from McGill in 1868 and was called to the Quebec Bar the same year. In 1869, he started practicing law in Knowlton and later in Sweetsburg. He was made a Queen's Counsel by the Quebec government in 1879 and the Federal government in 1881.

During the Fenian raids of 1866 Lynch took an active part in the formation of a company of volunteers at Brome, of which he became lieutenant, and remained such until his resignation in 1871. In 1870, he became editor of the Cowansville Observer. He was also Mayor of the Township of Brome, and Warden of the county. In 1874, he married Ellen Florence Pettes and they had two sons.

In 1871, he was acclaimed to the Legislative Assembly of Quebec for the electoral district of Brome and moved to Knowlton. A Conservative, he was acclaimed in 1875 and re-elected in 1881 and 1886. He was Solicitor-General in the cabinet of Joseph-Adolphe Chapleau and later was appointed commissioner of railways and commissioner of crown lands. In 1889, he was appointed a Judge of the Superior Court for the District of Bedford. He resigned in 1915 and died in 1916.
