= Napoléon Turcot =

Canadian politician

Member of the Legislative Assembly of Quebec for Montréal-Laurier
- In office 1912–1919
- Succeeded by: Ernest Poulin

Personal details
- Born: June 30, 1867 Montreal, Quebec, Canada
- Died: December 27, 1939 (aged 72) Montreal, Quebec
- Party: Liberal

Napoléon Turcot (30 June 1867 – 27 December 1939) was a Canadian politician.

Born in Montreal, Quebec, Turcot was a member of the Legislative Assembly of Quebec for Montréal-Laurier from 1912 to 1919.
