= Joseph-Hughes Fortier =

Canadian politician

Member of the Legislative Assembly of Quebec for Beauce
- In office 1921–1929
- Preceded by: Arthur Godbout
- Succeeded by: Joseph-Édouard Fortin

Personal details
- Born: December 19, 1877 Sainte-Marie, Quebec
- Died: September 22, 1955 (aged 77) Quebec City, Quebec
- Party: Liberal

Joseph-Hughes Fortier (December 19, 1877 – September 22, 1955) was a Canadian provincial politician. He was a Liberal member of the Legislative Assembly of Quebec for Beauce from 1921 to 1929.
