= Jonathan Robinson (Canadian politician) =

Canadian lawyer and politician

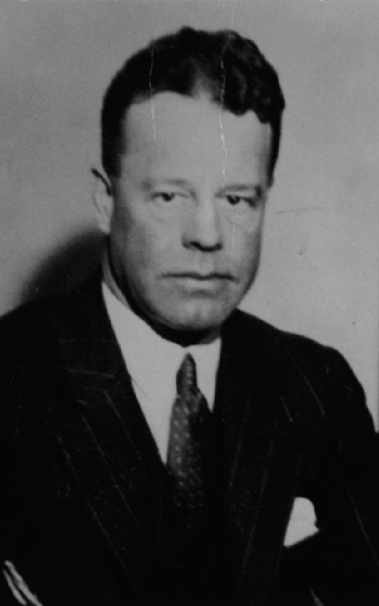

Member of the Legislative Assembly of Quebec for Brome
- In office 1936–1948
- Preceded by: Ralph Frederick Stockwell
- Succeeded by: Charles James Warwick Fox

Personal details
- Born: November 18, 1894 Waterloo, Quebec
- Died: October 11, 1948 (aged 53) Montreal, Quebec
- Party: Union Nationale
- Relations: Asa Belknap Foster, grandfather

Jonathan Robinson (November 18, 1894 – October 11, 1948) was a Canadian lawyer and provincial politician.

He was born in Waterloo, Quebec and was the grandson of Asa Belknap Foster. In 1928, he married Florence Walker McMaster, daughter of Andrew Ross McMaster. He studied law at McGill University and was admitted to the Bar of Quebec in 1938. He served as secretary of the Bar of Montreal in 1932 and 1933.

Robinson was a member of the Legislative Assembly of Quebec for the Union Nationale for Brome from 1936 until he died in 1948. He was Minister of Mines from 1944 until his death and was the representative of English-speaking Quebecers in the provincial cabinet.
