= Rufus Nelson England =

Canadian politician

Member of the Legislative Assembly of Quebec for Brome
- In office 1889–1897
- Preceded by: William Warren Lynch
- Succeeded by: Henry Thomas Duffy

Personal details
- Born: May 4, 1851 Knowlton, Canada East
- Died: November 28, 1911 (aged 60) Montreal, Quebec
- Party: Conservative

Rufus Nelson England (May 4, 1851 – November 28, 1911) was a merchant and political figure in Quebec. He represented Brome in the Legislative Assembly of Quebec from 1889 to 1897 as a Conservative.

He was born in Knowlton, Canada East, the son of Israël England and Mary Villiers Curtis, and was educated at the Knowlton Academy and Stanstead College. England was a telegraph operator for the Canadian Pacific Railway and postmaster at Knowlton. He was first elected to the Quebec assembly in an 1889 by-election held after William Warren Lynch was named a judge. He was married twice: first to a Miss Beach and then, in 1890, to Mary Cornelia Lambkin. England died in Montreal at the age of 60 and was buried in Knowlton, Quebec.
