= Henry Thomas Duffy =

Canadian politician

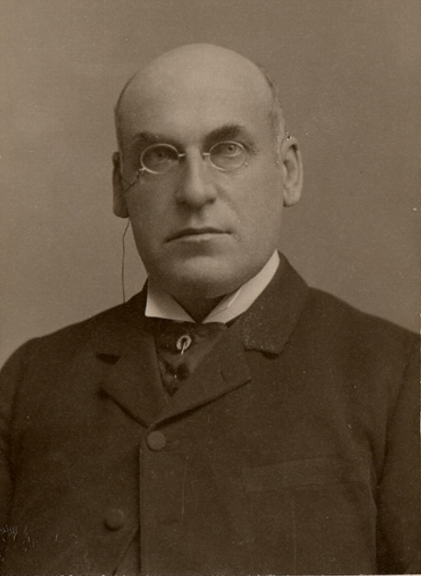

Member of the Legislative Assembly of Quebec for Brome
- In office 1897–1903
- Preceded by: Rufus Nelson England
- Succeeded by: John Charles McCorkill

Personal details
- Born: May 29, 1852 L'Avenir, Canada East
- Died: July 3, 1903 (aged 51) Quebec City, Quebec
- Party: Liberal

Henry Thomas Duffy KC (May 29, 1852 – July 3, 1903) was a Canadian politician.

Born in L'Avenir, Canada East, the son of John Duffy and Mary Ann Mountain, Duffy received a Bachelor of Arts degree in English literature in 1876 and a Bachelor of Laws degree in 1878 from McGill College. He was called to the Quebec Bar in 1879 and practiced law in Sweetsburg, Quebec in the Eastern Townships.

Entering politics, he ran unsuccessfully as the Liberal candidate for a seat in the Legislative Assembly of Quebec in an 1889 by-election held in the electoral district of Brome. In 1894, he was elected mayor of Sweetsburg, a post which he held for some time. He was elected in the 1897 election in Brome and was appointed minister of public works in the cabinet of Félix-Gabriel Marchand. In 1900, he was made provincial treasurer in the cabinet of Simon-Napoléon Parent. He help balance the budget and achieved a surplus. He was acclaimed in the 1900 election. He died in office in 1903.
