= Andrew Philps =

Canadian politician

Member of the Legislative Assembly of Quebec for Huntingdon
- In office 1913–1929
- Preceded by: William H. Walker
- Succeeded by: Martin Fisher

Personal details
- Born: April 7, 1857 Saginaw, Michigan, United States
- Died: October 4, 1929 (aged 72) Ottawa, Ontario, Canada
- Party: Liberal

Andrew Philps (April 7, 1857 – October 4, 1929) was a Canadian politician.

Born in Saginaw, Michigan, Philps was elected to the Legislative Assembly of Quebec for Huntingdon in a 1913 by-election. A Liberal, he was re-elected in 1916 and acclaimed in 1919. He was re-elected in 1923 and 1927.
