= Louis-Auguste Dupuis =

Canadian politician

Louis-Auguste Dupuis (August 24, 1884 – March 11, 1967) was an educator, notary and political figure in Quebec. He represented Kamouraska in the Legislative Assembly of Quebec from 1909 to 1912 as a Liberal.

He was born in Saint-Roch-des-Aulnets, the son of Jules-Arthur Dupuis and Eugénie Miville Dechêne. Dupuis was the grandson of Jean-Baptiste Couillard Dupuis. He was educated at the Collège de Sainte-Anne-de-la-Pocatière and the Université Laval. He articled as a notary, qualified to practise in 1907 and set up practice in Sainte-Anne-de-la-Pocatière. In 1908, he married Marie-Éva-Berthe Raymond.

Dupuis served as president of the Chambre des notaires from 1942 to 1945. He taught agricultural law at the School of Agriculture in La Pocatière from 1914 to 1943 and was professor in the faculty of agriculture at the Université Laval from 1943 to 1962.

He also was secretary and manager for the Caisse populaire at Sainte-Anne-de-la-Pocatière. Dupuis served as mayor of the village of Sainte-Anne-de-la-Pocatière from 1925 to 1936. He was elected to the Quebec assembly in a 1909 by-election held after Louis-Rodolphe Roy was named a judge. Dupis later ran unsuccessfully for a seat in the Quebec assembly in a 1920 by-election.

Dupuis died in Quebec City at the age of 82.

His uncle: Alphonse-Arthur Miville Dechêne served in the Canadian House of Commons and his uncles Pamphile-Gaspard Verreault and François-Gilbert Miville Dechêne were members of the Quebec assembly.
