= François-Gilbert Miville Dechêne =

Canadian politician

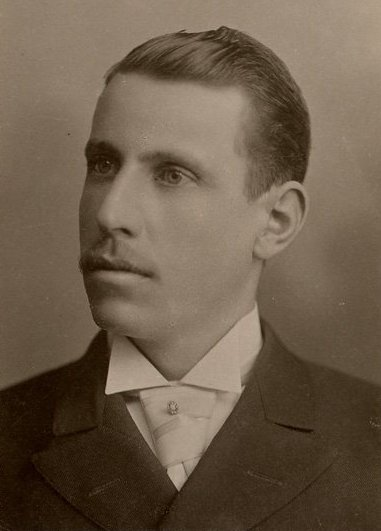

Member of the Legislative Assembly of Quebec for L'Islet
- In office 1886–1902
- Preceded by: Charles Marcotte
- Succeeded by: Joseph-Édouard Caron

Personal details
- Born: August 18, 1859 Saint-Roch-des-Aulnaies, Canada Esat
- Died: May 10, 1902 (aged 42) Quebec City, Quebec
- Party: Liberal

François-Gilbert Miville Dechêne (August 18, 1859 – May 10, 1902) was a lawyer and political figure in Quebec. He represented L'Islet in the Legislative Assembly of Quebec from 1886 to 1902 as a Liberal.

He was born in Saint-Roch-des-Aulnaies, the son of Alfred Miville, dit Dechêne and Luce Talbot. He was educated at L'Islet, at the Collège de Sainte-Anne-de-la-Pocatière and the Université Laval. Miville Dechêne was admitted to the Quebec bar in 1883 and set up practice at Quebec City. In 1897, he married Angéline Hudon. He contributed to the Quebec weekly l'Union libérale. Miville Dechêne served in the Quebec cabinet as Commissioner of Agriculture from 1897 to 1901 and Minister of Agriculture from 1901 to 1902. He died in office at Quebec City at the age of 43.

His brother Alphonse-Arthur Miville Dechêne served in the Canadian House of Commons and the Canadian senate. His nephew Joseph-Bruno-Aimé Miville Dechêne also served in the House of Commons; his nephew Louis-Auguste Dupuis was a member of the Quebec assembly.
