= Étienne Blanchard =

Canadian politician

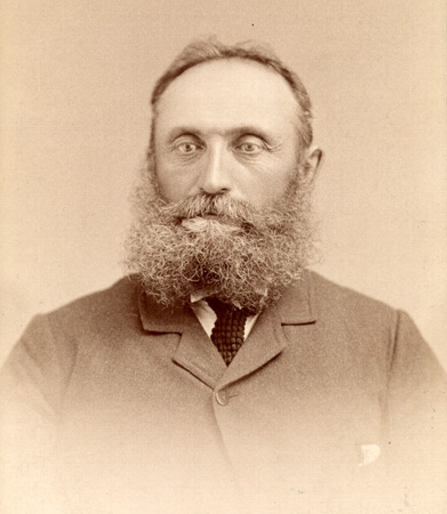

Member of the Legislative Assembly of Quebec for Verchères
- In office 1897–1908
- Preceded by: Albert-Alexandre Lussier
- Succeeded by: Amédée Geoffrion

Personal details
- Born: April 1, 1843 Saint-Jean-Baptiste, Canada East
- Died: September 25, 1918 (aged 75) Saint-Marc, Quebec
- Party: Liberal

Étienne Blanchard (April 1, 1843 – September 25, 1918) was a Canadian politician.

Born in Saint-Jean-Baptiste, Canada East, Blanchard was mayor of Saint-Marc in 1890 and 1891. He was the member of the Legislative Assembly of Quebec for Verchères from 1897 to 1908.
