= Amédée Geoffrion =

Canadian politician

Member of the Legislative Assembly of Quebec for Verchères
- In office 1908–1912
- Preceded by: Étienne Blanchard
- Succeeded by: Joseph-Léonide Perron

18th Mayor of Longueuil
- In office 1908–1912
- Preceded by: Bruno Normandin
- Succeeded by: Henri St-Mars

Personal details
- Born: 6 February 1867 Varennes, Canada East
- Died: 25 January 1935 (aged 67) Montreal, Quebec, Canada
- Party: Liberal
- Spouse: Yvonne Gaudet
- Education: Collège de l'Assomption; Université Laval
- Occupation: Lawyer

Amédée Geoffrion (February 6, 1867 – January 25, 1935) was a lawyer and politician in Quebec, Canada.

Geoffrion was born in Varennes, Canada East on February 6, 1867, to Élie Geoffrion and Marguerite Beauchamp. He studied at Collège de l'Assomption and Université Laval in Montreal. He was admitted to the Bar of Quebec on January 10, 1889.

Geoffrion's brother in law was Ernest Tétreau. He was the grandfather of Jérôme Choquette.

Geoffrion practiced law in Montreal alongside Joseph-Émery Robidoux, Dominique Monet, Victor Cusson and Omer Goyette.

== Political career ==
Geoffrion was a Quebec Liberal Party candidate in the provincial riding of Verchères in 1904, although lost.

He ran for the Liberals in Verchères again in 1908 and was elected as a Member of the Legislative Assembly of Quebec. He was re-elected in 1912, although stepped down on August 17, 1912. Geoffrion served as mayor of Longueuil from July 1908 until July 1912, at the same time he was MLA for Verchères.

He ran for the Liberal Party of Canada in the riding of Chambly—Verchères in the 1930 Canadian federal election and lost to Alfred Duranleau.
