= John Charles McCorkill =

Canadian politician

John Charles James Sarsfield McCorkill
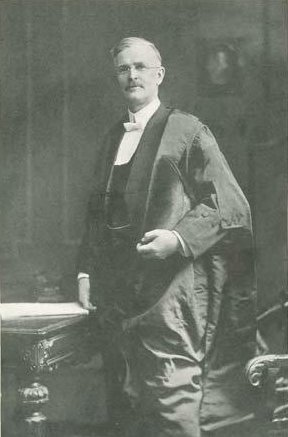

Member of the Legislative Assembly of Quebec for Missisquoi
- In office 1897–1898
- Preceded by: Elijah Edmund Spencer
- Succeeded by: Cédric Lemoine Cotton

Member of the Legislative Council of Quebec for Bedford
- In office 1898–1903
- Preceded by: Thomas Wood
- Succeeded by: Ernest De Varennes

Member of the Legislative Assembly of Quebec for Brome
- In office 1903–1906
- Preceded by: Henry Thomas Duffy
- Succeeded by: William Frederick Vilas

Personal details
- Born: 31 August 1854 Farnham, Canada East
- Died: 10 March 1920 (aged 65) Farnham, Quebec
- Party: Liberal

John Charles James Sarsfield McCorkill (31 August 1854 – 10 March 1920) was a Canadian lawyer, judge, and politician.

Born in Farnham, Quebec, the son of Robert McCorkill and Margaret Meighen, McCorkill was educated in Farnham and Saint-Jean, at the McGill Model School and Normal School, and received a Bachelor of Laws degree from McGill University in 1877. He served in the Fenian Raid of 1870 as a Captain of the 60th Battalion of Missisquoi County. He was called to the Bar of Quebec in 1878 and practiced law in Montreal, Farnham, and Cowansville. He was a major in the 5th Royal Scots while he lived in Montreal retiring in 1887.

He was President of the Liberal Association of Missisquoi. He unsuccessfully ran for the Legislative Assembly of Quebec for the electoral district of Missisquoi in the 1886 election and in an 1888 by-election. He was a municipal councillor of Cowansville from 1890 to 1891 and was mayor from 1892 to 1894. He was elected in the 1897 election and resigned in 1898 when he was appointed to the Legislative Council of Quebec for the division of Bedford. He resigned in 1903 when he was appointed Treasurer in the cabinets of Simon-Napoléon Parent and Lomer Gouin. He was re-elected by acclamation in 1904. In 1906, he was made a judge of the Superior Court for the Province of Quebec.

In 1884, he married Apphia Mary Leonard, the daughter of Elijah Leonard, who was a Senator.
