= Louis-Rodolphe Roy =

Canadian politician

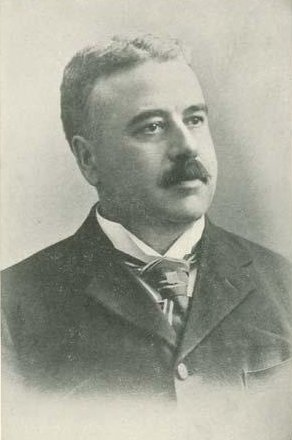

Member of the Legislative Assembly of Quebec for Kamouraska
- In office 1897–1909
- Preceded by: Charles-Alfred Desjardins
- Succeeded by: Louis-Auguste Dupuis

Personal details
- Born: February 7, 1858 Saint-Vallier, Canada East
- Died: May 14, 1925 (aged 67) Quebec City, Quebec
- Party: Quebec Liberal Party

Louis-Rodolphe Roy (7 February 1858 – 14 May 1925) was a Canadian lawyer, politician, and judge.

Born Saint-Vallier, Canada East, in the son of Nazaire Roy and Marie Letellier, Roy was educated at the Séminaire de Québec and received a Bachelor of Laws degree from the Université Laval in 1883. He was called to the Quebec Bar in 1883 and practiced law in Quebec City. He was created a King's Counsel in 1903 and received an honorary doctorate from the Université Laval in 1908.

He was first elected to the Legislative Assembly of Quebec for the electoral district of Kamouraska in 1897. A Liberal, he was re-elected in 1900, acclaimed in 1904, and re-elected in 1908. From 1905 to 1909, he was the Provincial Secretary and Registrar in the cabinet of Lomer Gouin. In 1909, he was appointed a judge of the Superior Court of the district of Rimouski. He retired in 1922.

He died in Quebec City in 1925 and was buried in the Notre-Dame-de-Belmont Cemetery in Sainte-Foy, Quebec.
