= Amédée Robitaille =

Canadian politician (1852–1930)

Member of the Legislative Assembly of Quebec
- In office May 11, 1897 – December 9, 1908

Amédée Robitaille, (born on December 31, 1852, in Quebec City and died on March 28, 1930, in the same city), was a Quebec lawyer and politician.

== Biography ==
He was the son of Olivier Robitaille, the mayor of Quebec City from 1856 to 1857, and Zoé-Louise Dénéchaud, daughter of Claude Dénéchau . He studied at the Seminary of Quebec and at the Université Laval. He was admitted to the Quebec Bar on July 17, 1877.

He practiced law in Quebec City and was a director of the Quebec and Lake St. John Railway Company. He was president of the Saint-Jean-Baptiste Society from 1887 to 1889.

He was elected alderman for the Saint-Jean district on the Quebec City Council in the 1890 municipal elections. He was re-elected and served until 1894. He was the chief organizer for the Quebec Liberal Party in his district. He was elected as a Member of the Legislative Assembly for Quebec in the 1897 Quebec general election. He was re-elected without opposition in 1900. He served as Provincial Secretary from June 30, 1902, to March 23, 1905.
