= William Frederick Vilas =

Canadian politician

Member of the Legislative Assembly of Quebec for Brome
- In office 1906–1917
- Preceded by: John Charles McCorkill
- Succeeded by: William Robert Oliver

Member of the Legislative Council of Quebec for Wellington
- In office 1917–1930
- Preceded by: Francis Edward Gilman
- Succeeded by: Gordon Wallace Scott

Personal details
- Born: 15 July 1853 East Farnham, Canada East
- Died: 15 August 1930 (aged 77) Cowansville, Quebec
- Party: Liberal

William Frederick Vilas (15 July 1853 – 15 August 1930) was a Canadian politician.

Born in East Farnham, Canada East, Vilas was mayor of Cowansville, Quebec from 1911 to 1922. He was acclaimed to the Legislative Assembly of Quebec for Brome in a 1906 by-election. A Liberal, he was re-elected in 1908 and 1912. He was acclaimed in 1916. He was appointed to the Legislative Council of Quebec for Wellington in 1917. He served until his death in Cowansville, Quebec in 1930.
