= Arthur Godbout =

Canadian politician

Member of the Legislative Assembly of Quebec for Beauce
- In office 1902–1921
- Preceded by: Henri Sévérin Béland
- Succeeded by: Joseph-Hughes Fortier

Personal details
- Born: December 13, 1872 Lambton, Quebec, Canada
- Died: March 12, 1932 (aged 59) Saint-Georges, Quebec, Canada
- Party: Liberal
- Relations: Joseph Godbout, brother

Arthur Godbout (December 13, 1872 – March 12, 1932) was a Canadian lawyer, politician, and judge.

Born in Lambton, Quebec, Godbout studied at the Séminaire de Québec and the Université Laval à Montréal. He was called to the Bar of Quebec in 1898 and was created a King's Counsel in 1912. He was a lawyer in Saint-Georges-Est and Saint-Joseph.

He was elected to the Legislative Assembly of Quebec for Beauce in a 1902 by-election. A Liberal, he was re-elected in 1908 and 1912. He was acclaimed in 1916 and re-elected in 1919. In 1921, he was appointed a judge for the district court in Beauce.
