= Brome (provincial electoral district) =

Coordinates: 45.20°N 72.55°W

Quebec electoral district

Defunct provincial electoral district
- Legislature: National Assembly of Quebec
- District created: 1867
- District abolished: 1972
- First contested: 1867
- Last contested: 1970

Brome was a provincial electoral district in the Estrie region of Quebec, Canada. It was created for the 1867 election (and an electoral district of that name existed earlier in the Legislative Assembly of the Province of Canada). Its last election was in 1970. It disappeared in the 1973 and its successor electoral district was Brome-Missisquoi.

== Members of the Legislative Assembly / National Assembly ==
- Christopher Dunkin, Conservative Party (1867–1871)
- William Warren Lynch, Conservative Party (1871–1889)
- Rufus Nelson England, Conservative Party (1889–1897)
- Henry Thomas Duffy, Liberal (1897–1903)
- John Charles James Sarsfield McCorkill, Liberal (1903–1906)
- William Frederick Vilas, Liberal (1906–1917)
- William Robert Oliver, Liberal (1917–1923)
- Carleton James Oliver, Liberal (1923–1931)
- Ralph Frederick Stockwell, Liberal (1931–1936)
- Jonathan Robinson, Union Nationale (1936–1948)
- Charles James Warwick Fox, Union Nationale (1948–1956)
- Glen Pettes Brown, Liberal (1956–1973)
