= William H. Walker (Canadian politician) =

Canadian politician

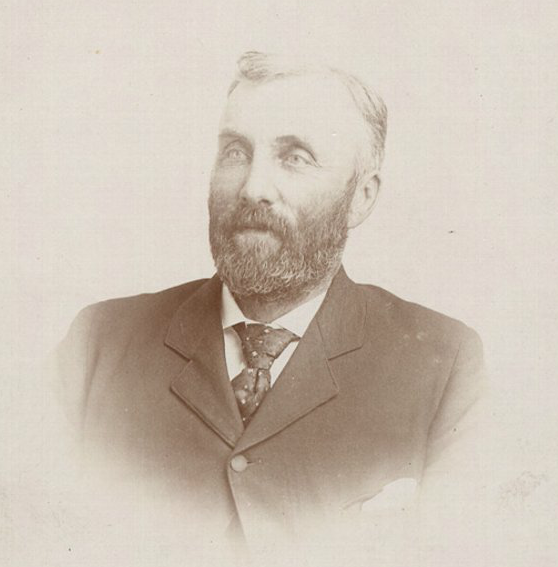

Member of the Legislative Assembly of Quebec for Huntingdon
- In office 1900–1913
- Preceded by: George Washington Stephens
- Succeeded by: Andrew Philps

Personal details
- Born: July 25, 1847 Ochiltree Manse, Ayrshire, Scotland
- Died: June 25, 1913 (aged 65) Godmanchester, Quebec
- Party: Liberal

William H. Walker (July 25, 1847 – June 25, 1913) was a Canadian politician.

Born in Ochiltree Manse, Ayrshire, Scotland, Walker emigrated to Canada in 1858. Walker was elected to the Legislative Assembly of Quebec for Huntingdon in 1900. A Liberal, he was acclaimed in 1904 and 1908. He was re-elected in 1912.
