= Missisquoi (provincial electoral district) =

Quebec electoral district

Defunct provincial electoral district
- Legislature: National Assembly of Quebec
- District created: 1867
- District abolished: 1972
- First contested: 1867
- Last contested: 1970

Missisquoi was a provincial electoral district in the Estrie region of Quebec, Canada that elected members to the National Assembly of Quebec.

It was created for the 1867 election (and an electoral district of that name existed earlier in the Legislative Assembly of the Province of Canada and the Legislative Assembly of Lower Canada). Its final election was in 1970. It disappeared in the 1973 election and its successor electoral district was Brome-Missisquoi.

== Members of the Legislative Assembly / National Assembly ==
- Josiah Sandford Brigham, Conservative Party (1867–1875)
- George Barnard Baker, Conservative Party (1875–1878)
- Ernest Racicot, Liberal – Conservative Party (1878–1881)
- Elijah Edmund Spencer, Conservative Party (1881–1897)
- John Charles James Sarsfield McCorkill, Liberal (1897–1898)
- Cédric Lemoine Cotton, Liberal (1898–1900)
- Joseph-Jean-Baptiste Gosselin, Liberal (1900–1919)
- Alexandre Saurette, Liberal (1919–1935)
- François Pouliot, Conservative Party – Union Nationale (1935–1939)
- Henri Gosselin, Liberal (1939–1948)
- Jean-Jacques Bertrand, Union Nationale (1948–1973)
