= 8th Quebec Legislature =

The 8th Legislative Assembly of Quebec was the provincial legislature in Quebec, Canada that existed from March 8, 1892, to March 6, 1897. The Quebec Conservative Party was the governing party for the last time in Quebec. Charles Boucher de Boucherville was the Premier for much of 1892; Louis-Olivier Taillon ran the province for most of the mandate until he was replaced by Edmund James Flynn during the final year. The Conservatives would remain the opposition party until 1935, when they merged with the Union Nationale which won the elections held the following year.

== Seats per political party ==
- After the 1892 elections

Affiliation	Members
Conservative	51
Liberal	21
Conservative Independent	1
Total	73
Government Majority	30

== Member list ==
This was the list of members of the Legislative Assembly of Quebec that were elected in the 1892 election:

Name	Party	Riding	First elected / previously elected	No. of terms
William John Simpson	Conservative	Argenteuil	1892	1st term
Joseph-Éna Girouard	Liberal	Arthabaska	1886	3rd term
Milton McDonald	Conservative	Bagot	1890	2nd term
Joseph Poirier	Conservative	Beauce	1878, 1892	2nd term*
Moïse Plante	Conservative	Beauharnois	1892	1st term
Élie-Hercule Bisson (1892)	Liberal	Beauharnois	1873, 1886, 1892	5th term*
Adélard Turgeon	Liberal	Bellechasse	1890	2nd term
Victor Allard	Conservative	Berthier	1892	1st term
Honoré Mercier	Liberal	Bonaventure	1879	5th term
François-Xavier Lemieux (1894)	Liberal	Bonaventure	1883, (Note: Lévis) 1894	4th term*
Rufus Nelson England	Conservative	Brome	1889	3rd term
Louis-Olivier Taillon	Conservative	Chambly	1875, (Note: Montréal-Est) 1886, (Note: Montcalm) 1892	5th term*
Pierre Grenier	Conservative	Champlain	1890	2nd term
Joseph Morin	Liberal	Charlevoix	1886	3rd term
William Greig	Conservative	Châteauguay	1892	1st term
Honoré Petit	Conservative	Chicoutimi et Saguenay	1892	1st term
John McIntosh	Conservative	Compton	1886	3rd term
Charles McClary (1894)	Conservative	Compton	1894	1st term
Benjamin Beauchamp	Conservative Independent	Deux-Montagnes	1882	4th term
Louis-Philippe Pelletier	Conservative	Dorchester	1888	3rd term
Joseph Peter Cooke	Conservative	Drummond	1892	1st term
Edmund James Flynn	Conservative (Note: First elected as Liberal)	Gaspé	1875, 1892	4th term*
Joseph-Octave Villeneuve	Conservative	Hochelaga	1886, 1890	3rd term*
George Washington Stephens Sr.	Liberal	Huntingdon	1881, (Note: Montréal-Centre) 1892	2nd term*
François Gosselin	Liberal	Iberville	1890	2nd term
François-Gilbert Miville Dechêne	Liberal	Islet	1886	3rd term
Joseph-Adélard Descarries	Conservative	Jacques Cartier	1892	1st term
Joseph-Mathias Tellier	Conservative	Joliette	1892	1st term
Charles-Alfred Desjardins	Conservative	Kamouraska	1890	2nd term
Joseph Girard	Conservative	Lac St-Jean	1892	1st term
Cyrille Doyon	Conservative	Laprairie	1892	1st term
Joseph Marion	Conservative	L'Assomption	1880, 1890	4th term*
Pierre-Évariste Leblanc	Conservative	Laval	1882, 1884	5th term*
Angus Baker	Conservative	Lévis	1892	1st term
Édouard-Hippolyte Laliberté	Liberal	Lotbinière	1886	3rd term
Hector Caron	Liberal	Maskinongé	1892	1st term
Edmund James Flynn	Conservative	Matane	1875, (Note: First elected as Liberal in Gaspé) 1892	4th term*
Louis-Félix Pinault (1892)	Liberal	Matane	1890, 1892	2nd term*
James King	Conservative	Mégantic	1892	1st term
Elijah Edmund Spencer	Conservative	Missisquoi	1881	4th term
Octave Magnan	Conservative	Montcalm	1878, 1892	2nd term*
Nazaire Bernatchez	Liberal	Montmagny	1883	4th term
Thomas Chase Casgrain	Conservative	Montmorency	1886, (Note: Québec-Comté) 1892	2nd term*
Édouard Bouffard (1896)	Conservative	Montmorency	1896	1st term
François Martineau	Conservative	Montréal division no. 1	1892	1st term
Olivier-Maurice Augé	Conservative	Montréal division no. 2	1892	1st term
Damase Parizeau	Conservative	Montréal division no. 3	1892	1st term
Alexander Webb Morris	Conservative	Montréal division no. 4	1892	1st term
Albert William Atwater (1896)	Conservative	Montréal division no. 4	1896	1st term
John Smythe Hall	Conservative	Montréal division no. 5	1886	3rd term
Patrick Kennedy	Conservative	Montréal division no. 6	1892	1st term
James John Edmund Guerin (1895)	Liberal	Montréal division no. 6	1895	1st term
Louis Sainte-Marie	Conservative	Napierville	1890	2nd term
Louis Beaubien	Conservative	Nicolet	1867, (Note: Hochelaga) 1892	5th term*
Nérée Tétreau	Conservative	Ottawa	1892	1st term
David Gillies	Liberal	Pontiac	1892	1st term
Jules Tessier	Liberal	Portneuf	1886	3rd term
Charles Fitzpatrick	Liberal	Québec-Comté	1890	2nd term
Victor Châteauvert	Conservative	Québec-Centre	1892	1st term
Joseph Shehyn	Liberal	Québec-Est	1875	6th term
Félix Carbray	Conservative	Québec-Ouest	1881, 1892	2nd term*
Louis Lacouture	Conservative	Richelieu	1892	1st term
Joseph Bédard	Conservative	Richmond	1890	2nd term
Auguste Tessier	Liberal	Rimouski	1889	3rd term
Alfred Girard	Liberal	Rouville	1890	2nd term
Antoine-Paul Cartier	Conservative	St. Hyacinthe	1892	1st term
Félix-Gabriel Marchand	Liberal	St. Jean	1867	8th term
Nérée Duplessis	Conservative	St. Maurice	1886	3rd term
Simon-Napoléon Parent	Liberal	St. Sauveur	1890	2nd term
Adolphe-François Savaria	Conservative	Shefford	1892	1st term
Louis-Edmond Panneton	Conservative	Sherbrooke	1892	1st term
Avila-Gonzague Bourbonnais	Liberal	Soulanges	1886	3rd term
Michael Felix Hackett	Conservative	Stanstead	1892	1st term
Napoléon Rioux	Conservative	Témiscouata	1892	1st term
Guillaume-Alphonse Nantel	Conservative	Terrebonne	1882	4th term
Télesphore-Eusèbe Normand	Conservative	Trois-Rivières	1890	2nd term
Hilaire Cholette	Conservative	Vaudreuil	1892	1st term
Albert-Alexandre Lussier	Liberal	Verchères	1886	3rd term
Jérôme-Adolphe Chicoyne	Conservative	Wolfe	1892	1st term
Victor Gladu	Liberal	Yamaska	1886	3rd term

== Other elected MLAs ==
Other MLAs were elected in this mandate during by-elections

- Élie-Hercule Bisson, Quebec Liberal Party, Beauharnois, June 7, 1892
- Louis-Felix Pinault, Quebec Liberal Party, Matane, November 3, 1892
- Charles McClary, Quebec Conservative Party, Compton, October 19, 1894
- François-Xavier Lemieux, Quebec Liberal Party, Bonaventure, December 11, 1894
- James John Guerin, Quebec Liberal Party, Montréal division no.6, October 22, 1895
- Albert William Atwater, Quebec Conservative Party, Montréal division no.4, June 4, 1896
- Édouard Bouffard, Quebec Conservative Party, Montmorency, June 23, 1896

== Cabinet Ministers ==
=== De Boucherville Cabinet (1892) ===
- Prime Minister and Executive Council President: Charles-Eugène Boucher de Boucherville
- Agriculture and Colonization: Louis Beaubien
- Public Works: Guillaume-Alphonse Nantel
- Crown Lands: Edmund James Flynn
- Attorney General: Thomas Chase Casgrain (1892), Edmund Jamess Flynn (1892)
- Provincial secretary: Louis-Philippe Pelletier
- Treasurer: John Smythe Hall (1892), Charles-Eugène Boucher de Boucherville (1892)
- Members without portfolios: Louis-Olivier Taillon, John McIntosh

=== Taillon Cabinet (1892-1896) ===
- Prime Minister: Louis-Olivier Taillon
- Executive Council President: Louis-Olivier Taillon (1892–1895), Michael Felix Hackett (1895–1896)
- Agriculture and Colonization: Louis Beaubien
- Public Works: Guillaume-Alphonse Nantel
- Crown Lands: Edmund James Flynn
- Attorney General:Edmund Jamess Flynn (1892), Thomas Chase Casgrain (1892–1896)
- Provincial secretary: Louis-Philippe Pelletier
- Treasurer: Louis-Olivier Taillon (1892, 1894–1896), John Smythe Hall (1892–1894)
- Members without portfolios: Thomas Chapais (1893–1896), John McIntosh (1893–1896), Alexander Webb Morris (1895–1896)

=== Flynn Cabinet (1896-1897) ===
- Prime Minister: Edmund James Flynn
- Executive Council President: Thomas Chapais
- Agriculture and Colonization: Louis Beaubien (1896–1897)
  - Agriculture: Louis Beaubien (1897)
  - Colonization and Mines: Thomas Chapais (1897)
- Public Works: Edmund James Flynn
- Crown Lands: Guillaume-Alphonse Nantel (1896–1897)
  - Lands, Forests and Fishing: Guillaume-Alphonse Nantel (1897)
- Attorney General:Louis-Philippe Pelletier
- Provincial secretary: Michael Felix Hackett
- Treasurer: Albert William Atwater

== New electoral districts ==
The electoral map was slightly modified in 1895 with the creation of the Îles-de-la-Madeleine district, which was formed from parts of Gaspé and includes the Magdalen Islands.
