= 7th Quebec Legislature =

The 7th Legislative Assembly of Quebec was the provincial legislature that existed in Quebec, Canada from June 17, 1890, to March 8, 1892. The Quebec Liberal Party led by Honoré Mercier was the governing party for most of the mandate. The party was also known as the Parti national which composed previously of Conservative dissents that formed a new party, the Parti National. However, Mercier was dismissed by the Lieutenant-Governor Auguste-Réal Angers due to a scandal and the final months of the Assembly was led by Charles Boucher de Boucherville of the Quebec Conservative Party. Due to the minority status of the government in the final months, an election was immediately called.

== Seats per political party ==
- After the 1890 elections

Affiliation	Members
Liberal/Parti national	43
Conservative	24
Nationalistes/Parti National	4
Parti ouvrier	1
Conservative Independent	1
Total	73
Government Majority	19

== Member list ==
This was the list of members of the Legislative Assembly of Quebec that were elected in the 1890 election:

Name	Party	Riding	First elected / previously elected	No. of terms
William Owens	Conservative	Argenteuil	1881	3rd term
Joseph-Éna Girouard	Liberal	Arthabaska	1886	2nd term
Milton McDonald	Conservative	Bagot	1890	1st term
Jean Blanchet	Conservative	Beauce	1881	3rd term
Élie-Hercule Bisson	Liberal	Beauharnois	1873, 1886	4th term*
Adélard Turgeon	Liberal	Bellechasse	1890	1st term
Cuthbert-Alphonse Chenevert	Liberal	Berthier	1890	1st term
Honoré Mercier	Liberal	Bonaventure	1879	4th term
Rufus Nelson England	Conservative	Brome	1889	2nd term
Antoine Rocheleau	Liberal	Chambly	1886	2nd term
Pierre Grenier	Conservative	Champlain	1890	1st term
Joseph Morin	Liberal	Charlevoix	1886	2nd term
Joseph-Émery Robidoux	Liberal	Châteauguay	1884	3rd term
Onésime Côté	Parti National	Chicoutimi et Saguenay	1890	1st term
John McIntosh	Conservative	Compton	1886	2nd term
Benjamin Beauchamp	Conservative Independent	Deux-Montagnes	1882	3rd term
Louis-Philippe Pelletier	Conservative	Dorchester	1888	2nd term
William John Watts	Liberal	Drummond	1874, 1890	5th term*
Achille-Ferdinand Carrier	Liberal	Gaspé	1890	1st term
Joseph-Octave Villeneuve	Conservative	Hochelaga	1886, 1890	2nd term*
Alexander Cameron	Liberal	Huntingdon	1874	6th term
François Gosselin	Liberal	Iberville	1890	1st term
François-Gilbert Miville Dechêne	Liberal	Islet	1886	2nd term
Arthur Boyer	Liberal	Jacques Cartier	1884	3rd term
Louis Basinet	Liberal	Joliette	1886	2nd term
Charles-Alfred Desjardins	Conservative	Kamouraska	1890	1st term
Pierre-Léandre Marcotte	Liberal	Lac St-Jean	1890	1st term
Georges Duhamel	Parti national	Laprairie	1886	2nd term
Joseph Marion	Conservative	L'Assomption	1880, 1890	3rd term*
Pierre-Évariste Leblanc	Conservative	Laval	1882, 1884	4th term*
François-Xavier Lemieux	Liberal	Lévis	1883	3rd term
Édouard-Hippolyte Laliberté	Liberal	Lotbinière	1886	2nd term
Joseph Lessard	Conservative	Maskinongé	1890	1st term
Louis-Félix Pinault	Liberal	Matane	1890	1st term
Andrew Stuart Johnson	Conservative	Mégantic	1886, 1890	2nd term*
Elijah Edmund Spencer	Conservative	Missisquoi	1881	3rd term
Joseph-Alcide Martin	Conservative	Montcalm	1890	1st term
Nazaire Bernatchez	Liberal	Montmagny	1883	3rd term
Charles Langelier	Liberal	Montmorency	1878, 1890	2nd term*
Joseph Béland	Parti ouvrier	Montréal division no. 1	1890	1st term
Joseph Brunet	Liberal	Montréal division no. 2	1890	1st term
Henri-Benjamin Rainville	Liberal	Montréal division no. 3	1890	1st term
William Clendinneng	Conservative	Montréal division no. 4	1890	1st term
John Smythe Hall	Conservative	Montréal division no. 5	1886	2nd term
James McShane	Liberal	Montréal division no. 6	1878	4th term
Louis Sainte-Marie	Conservative	Napierville	1890	1st term
Joseph-Victor Monfette	Parti national	Nicolet	1890	1st term
Alfred Rochon	Liberal	Ottawa	1887	2nd term
William Joseph Poupore	Conservative	Pontiac	1882	3rd term
Jules Tessier	Liberal	Portneuf	1886	2nd term
Charles Fitzpatrick	Liberal	Québec-Comté	1890	1st term
Rémi-Ferdinand Rinfret dit Malouin	Liberal	Québec-Centre	1874	6th term
Joseph Shehyn	Liberal	Québec-Est	1875	5th term
Owen Murphy	Liberal	Québec-Ouest	1886	2nd term
Louis-Pierre-Paul Cardin	Liberal	Richelieu	1886	2nd term
Joseph Bédard	Conservative	Richmond	1890	1st term
Auguste Tessier	Liberal	Rimouski	1889	2nd term
Alfred Girard	Liberal	Rouville	1890	1st term
Odilon Desmarais	Liberal	St. Hyacinthe	1890	1st term
Félix-Gabriel Marchand	Liberal	St. Jean	1867	7th term
Nérée Duplessis	Conservative	St. Maurice	1886	2nd term
Simon-Napoléon Parent	Liberal	St. Sauveur	1890	1st term
Tancrède Boucher de Grosbois	Liberal	Shefford	1888	2nd term
Joseph Gibb Robertson	Conservative	Sherbrooke	1867	7th term
Avila-Gonzague Bourbonnais	Parti national	Soulanges	1886	2nd term
Moodie Brock Lovell	Liberal	Stanstead	1890	1st term
Charles-Eugène Pouliot	Liberal	Témiscouata	1890	1st term
Guillaume-Alphonse Nantel	Conservative	Terrebonne	1882	3rd term
Télesphore-Eusèbe Normand	Conservative	Trois-Rivières	1890	1st term
Émery Lalonde, Jr.	Liberal	Vaudreuil	1890	1st term
Albert-Alexandre Lussier	Liberal	Verchères	1886	2nd term
Jacques Picard	Conservative	Wolfe	1867	7th term
Victor Gladu	Liberal	Yamaska	1886	2nd term

== Other elected MLAs ==
No MLAs were elected during by-elections in this mandate

== Cabinet Ministers ==
=== Mercier Cabinet (1890-1891) ===
- Prime Minister: Honoré Mercier
- Executive Council President: Charles Langelier (1890), David Alexander Ross (1890–1891)
- Agriculture and Colonization: Honoré Mercier
- Public Works: Pierre Garneau
- Crown Lands: Georges Duhamel
- Attorney General: Arthur Turcotte (1890), Joseph-Emery Robidoux (1890–1891)
- Secretary and Registry: Joseph-Émery Robidoux (1890), Charles Langelier (1890–1891)
- Treasurer: Joseph Shehyn
- Members without portfolios: Arthur Boyer

=== De Boucherville Cabinet (1891-1892) ===
- Prime Minister and Executive Council President: Charles-Eugène Boucher de Boucherville
- Agriculture and Colonization: Louis Beaubien
- Public Works: Guillaume-Alphonse Nantel
- Crown Lands: Edmund James Flynn
- Attorney General: Thomas Chase Casgrain
- Provincial secretary: Louis-Philippe Pelletier
- Treasurer: John Smythe Hall
- Members without portfolios: Louis-Olivier Taillon, John McIntosh
