= Yvon Lafrance =

Canadian politician (1944–2022)

Yvon Lafrance (4 August 1944 – 30 September 2022) was a Canadian politician in Quebec, and was the Member of the National Assembly for the electoral district of Iberville.

Lafrance was born in Iberville, Quebec on 4 August 1944. First elected in 1989 election, he served as a Liberal backbencher under Premier Robert Bourassa for most of the term. On 9 February 1994, he crossed the floor to sit as an Independent. On 2 March 1994, he joined the newly formed Action démocratique du Québec (ADQ), six months before Mario Dumont was first elected to the National Assembly. Therefore, he became the first ADQ sitting MNA in history.

Lafrance did not run for re-election in the 1994 election.

Preceded by Jacques Tremblay (Liberal)	MNA, District of Iberville; 1989–1994	Succeeded by Richard Le Hir (PQ)
