= Séverin Dumais =

Canadian politician

Séverin Dumais (February 10, 1840 – April 28, 1907) was a notary and political figure in Quebec. He represented Chicoutimi-Saguenay in the Legislative Assembly of Quebec from 1888 to 1890 as a Parti National member.

He was born in Saint-Georges-de-Cacouna, Lower Canada, the son of Paschal Dumais and Éléonore Couillard, and was educated at Sainte-Anne-de-la-Pocatière. Dumais articled with his father and then F.S. McKey, qualified to practise as a notary in 1864 and set up practice in Hébertville. He married Honorine Gagné in 1887. Dumais was mayor of Hébertville from 1881 to 1890. In 1899, he was named a crown lands agent. He also served as a lieutenant in the militia.

Dumais ran unsuccessfully for a seat in the Quebec assembly in 1886, losing to Élie Saint-Hilaire. He was elected to the assembly in an 1888 by-election held after Saint-Hilaire's death and was defeated when he ran for reelection in 1890.

Dumais died in Hébertville at the age of 67.
