= Henri-Benjamin Rainville =

Canadian politician (1852–1937)

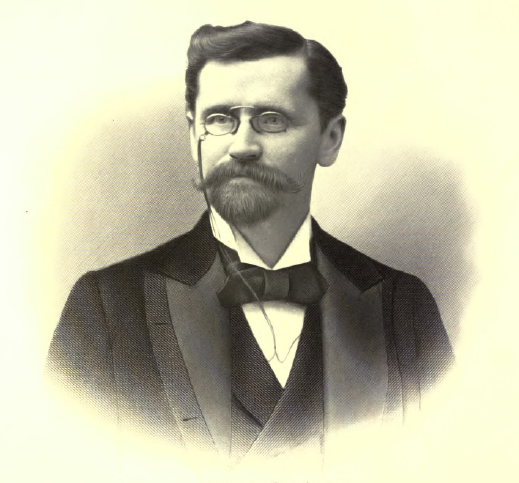

Member of the Legislative Assembly of Quebec for Montréal division no. 3
- In office 1890–1892
- Preceded by: Laurent-Olivier David
- Succeeded by: Damase Parizeau
- In office 1897–1904
- Preceded by: Damase Parizeau
- Succeeded by: Godfroy Langlois

Personal details
- Born: April 5, 1852 Sainte-Marie-de-Monnoir, Canada East
- Died: August 10, 1937 (aged 85) Atlantic City, New Jersey
- Party: Liberal

Henri-Benjamin Rainville (French pronunciation: [ɑ̃ʁi bɛ̃ʒamɛ̃ ʁɛ̃vil]; April 5, 1852 – August 10, 1937) was a Canadian lawyer, politician and Speaker of the Legislative Assembly of the Province of Quebec.

Born in Sainte-Marie-de-Monnoir, Quebec, the son of Felix Rainville, a farmer of French descent from Touques (Calvados), and Marie Daignault, Rainville obtained his elementary and classical education at the colleges of St. Hyacinthe and Ste. Angele de Monnoir, afterwards entering the law faculty of McGill University, and graduating with the degree of B.C.L. in 1873. He was called to the Quebec Bar on January 14, 1874 and practiced law with the law firm of Rainville, Archambault Gervais and Rainville. He was a member of the Montreal City Council from 1882 until 1900, sitting for Centre Ward.

He was first elected to the Legislative Assembly of Quebec for Montréal division no. 3 in the 1890 election. A Liberal, he was defeated in 1892, but was elected in 1897 and 1900. From 1901 to 1905, he was the Speaker of the Legislative Assembly. He was defeated in 1904 and 1908. He was the brother of Judge Henri-Félix Rainville.

Political offices
Preceded by Jules Tessier	Speaker of the Legislative Assembly of Quebec; 14 February 1901 – 2 March 1905	Succeeded by Auguste Tessier
