= Iberville (Quebec provincial electoral district) =

Provincial electoral district in Quebec, Canada

Quebec electoral district
- Coordinates: 45.328°N 73.139°W

Provincial electoral district
- Legislature: National Assembly of Quebec
MNA
Camille Pellerin-Forget
Parti Québécois
- District created: 1867
- First contested: 1867
- Last contested: 2026

Demographics
- Electors (2012): 45,975
- Area (km²): 1,026.0
- Census subdivision(s): Saint-Jean-sur-Richelieu (part), Ange-Gardien, Clarenceville, Henryville, Marieville, Mont-Saint-Grégoire, Noyan, Rougemont, Saint-Alexandre, Sainte-Angèle-de-Monnoir, Sainte-Anne-de-Sabrevois, Sainte-Brigide-d'Iberville, Saint-Césaire, Saint-Paul-d'Abbotsford, Saint-Sébastien, Venise-en-Québec

Iberville (French pronunciation: [ibɛʁvil]) is a provincial electoral district in the Montérégie region of the province of Quebec, Canada. It is located south of Montreal. It includes part of the city of Saint-Jean-sur-Richelieu, as well as Marieville, Saint-Césaire and Mont Saint-Grégoire.

It was created for the 1867 election, and an electoral district of that name existed earlier in the Legislative Assembly of the Province of Canada.

It was named after former New France explorer Pierre Le Moyne d'Iberville.

The city of Saint-Pie was lost to the Saint-Hyacinthe district in the 2011 electoral map, updated from the 2001 map.

Since the 1980s, three Iberville MNAs have crossed the floor:

- Yvon Lafrance, elected liberal (1989) becomes in 1994 the first ADQ sitting in history
- André Riedl, elected adéquiste (2007) joins the liberal government in 2008
- Claire Samson, elected in 2014 and 2018 as a member of the CAQ, in 2021 joins the Conservative Party of Quebec, and becomes its first sitting member in the national assembly.

Note: Manitoba also has a provincial electoral district named Iberville, and there was also a federal Iberville electoral district.

== Members of the Legislative Assembly / National Assembly ==
Legislature	Years	Member	Party
1st	1867–1871	Louis Molleur	Liberal
2nd	1871–1875	Louis Molleur	Liberal
3rd	1875–1878	Louis Molleur	Liberal
4th	1878–1881	Louis Molleur	Liberal
5th	1881–1886	Alexis-Louis Demers	Liberal
6th	1886–1890	Georges Duhamel	Parti national
7th	1890–1892	François Gosselin	Liberal
8th	1892–1897	François Gosselin	Liberal
9th	1897–1900	François Gosselin	Liberal
10th	1900–1904	François Gosselin	Liberal
11th	1904–1906	François Gosselin	Liberal
11th	1906–1908	Joseph-Aldéric Benoit	Liberal
12th	1908–1912	Joseph-Aldéric Benoit	Liberal
13th	1912–1916	Joseph-Aldéric Benoit	Liberal
14th	1916–1919	Joseph-Aldéric Benoit	Liberal
15th	1919–1923	Adélard Forget	Liberal
16th	1923–1927	Lucien Lamoureux	Liberal
17th	1927–1931	Lucien Lamoureux	Liberal
18th	1931–1935	Lucien Lamoureux	Liberal
19th	1935–1936	Lucien Lamoureux	Liberal
20th	1936–1939	Lucien Lamoureux	Liberal
21st	1939–1944	Émile Bonvouloir	Liberal
22nd	1944–1948	Yvon Thuot	Union Nationale
23rd	1948–1952	Yvon Thuot	Union Nationale
24th	1952–1956	Yvon Thuot	Union Nationale
25th	1956–1960	Yvon Thuot	Union Nationale
26th	1960–1962	Laurent Hamel	Liberal
27th	1962–1966	Laurent Hamel	Liberal
28th	1966–1970	Alfred Croisetière	Union Nationale
29th	1970–1973	Alfred Croisetière	Union Nationale
30th	1973–1976	Jacques-Raymond Tremblay	Liberal
31st	1976–1981	Jacques Beausejour	Parti Québécois
32nd	1981–1985	Jacques Beausejour	Parti Québécois
33rd	1985–1989	Jacques Tremblay	Liberal
34th	1989–1994	Yvon Lafrance	Liberal
34th	1994–1994	Yvon Lafrance	Independent
34th	1994–1994	Yvon Lafrance	Action démocratique
35th	1994–1996	Richard Le Hir	Parti Québécois
35th	1996–1998	Richard Le Hir	Independent
36th	1998–2003	Jean-Paul Bergeron	Parti Québécois
37th	2003–2007	Jean Rioux	Liberal
38th	2007–2008	André Riedl	Action démocratique
38th	2008–2008	André Riedl	Liberal
39th	2008–2012	Marie Bouillé	Parti Québécois
40th	2012–2014	Marie Bouillé	Parti Québécois
41st	2014–2018	Claire Samson	Coalition Avenir Québec
42nd	2018–2021	Claire Samson	Coalition Avenir Québec
42nd	2021–2022	Claire Samson	Conservative
43rd	2022–2026	Audrey Bogemans	Coalition Avenir Québec
44th	2026–Present	Camille Pellerin-Forget	Parti Québécois

== Election results ==
2026 Quebec general election
** Preliminary results — Not yet official **
Party	Candidate	Votes	%	±%
Parti Québécois	Camille Pellerin-Forget	12,755	35.51	+20.27
Conservative	Mathieu Guérin	7,948	22.13	+10.86
Coalition Avenir Québec	Audrey Bogemans	6,762	18.82	–34.33
Liberal	Vanessa Riendeau	4,631	12.89	+7.25
Québec solidaire	Nicolas Chatel-Launay	3,085	8.59	–5.13
Libertarian	Caroline Blake	434	1.21	N/A
Parti nul	Marie-Hélène Roy Rioux	306	0.85	N/A
Total valid votes		35,921	98.21	–0.17
Total rejected ballots		654	1.79	+0.17
Turnout		36,575	71.14	+0.91
Electors on the lists		51,412		
Parti Québécois gain from Coalition Avenir Québec		Swing		+4.71
Source: Élections Québec

2022 Quebec general election
Party	Candidate	Votes	%	±%
Coalition Avenir Québec	Audrey Bogemans	18,223	53.15	+5.53
Parti Québécois	Jean-Alexandre Côté	5,227	15.24	-2.30
Québec solidaire	Philippe Jetten-Vigeant	4,703	13.72	-3.60
Conservative	Anne Casabonne	3,863	11.27	+9.52
Liberal	Steve Trinque	1,934	5.64	-6.66
Climat Québec	Philippe Brassard	257	0.75	–
Démocratie directe	Jean-Charles Cléroux	81	0.24	–
Total valid votes		34,288	98.38	–
Total rejected ballots		564	1.62	-0.43
Turnout		34,852	70.23	-0.65
Electors on the lists		49,629	–	–
Coalition Avenir Québec hold		Swing		+3.92

2018 Quebec general election
Party	Candidate	Votes	%	±%
Coalition Avenir Québec	Claire Samson	15,892	47.62	+13.39
Parti Québécois	Nicolas Dionne	5,857	17.55	-13.95
Québec solidaire	Philippe Jetten-Vigeant	5,779	17.32	+10.3
Liberal	Mylène Gaudreau	4,106	12.3	-14.14
Green	Michelle Kolatschek	631	1.89	
Conservative	Serge Benoit	583	1.75	
New Democratic	Marc-André Renaud	269	0.81	
Bloc Pot	Dany Desjardins	258	0.77	
Total valid votes		33,375	97.95	
Total rejected ballots		697	2.05	
Turnout		34,072	70.88	
Eligible voters		48,072		
Coalition Avenir Québec hold		Swing		+13.67
Source(s) "Rapport des résultats officiels du scrutin". Élections Québec.

2014 Quebec general election
Party	Candidate	Votes	%	±%
Coalition Avenir Québec	Claire Samson	11,135	34.23	+0.84
Parti Québécois	Marie Bouillé	10,249	31.50	-7.40
Liberal	Chantal Tremblay	8,602	26.44	+7.15
Québec solidaire	Myriam-Zaa Normandin	2,283	7.02	+2.89
Option nationale	Claude Savard	265	0.81	-1.07
Total valid votes		32,534	98.04	–
Total rejected ballots		652	1.96	–
Turnout		33,186	71.00	
Electors on the lists		46,739	–	–
Coalition Avenir Québec gain from Parti Québécois		Swing		+4.12

2012 Quebec general election
Party	Candidate	Votes	%	±%
Parti Québécois	Marie Bouillé	13,779	38.90	-2.29
Coalition Avenir Québec	Claire Samson	11,826	33.39	+12.03
Liberal	Alain Ménard	6,833	19.29	-12.91
Québec solidaire	Myriam-Zaa Normandin	1,462	4.13	+1.99
Green	Marie-France Allard	853	2.41	-0.17
Option nationale	Claude Chagnon	669	1.89	
Total valid votes		35,422	98.48	–
Total rejected ballots		546	1.52	–
Turnout		35,968	77.99	
Electors on the lists		46,119	–	–
Parti Québécois hold		Swing		-6.87

^ Change is from redistributed results. CAQ change is from ADQ.

2008 Quebec general election
Party	Candidate	Votes	%	±%
Parti Québécois	Marie Bouille	11,698	41.26	
Liberal	Andre Riedl	9,075	32.01	
Action démocratique	Lyne Denechaud	6,087	21.47	
Green	Guy Berger	882	3.11	–
Québec solidaire	Andre Dupuis	612	2.16	

2007 Quebec general election
Party	Candidate	Votes	%
Action démocratique	André Riedl	14,365	42.23
Parti Québécois	Marie Bouillé	9,262	27.23
Liberal	Jean Rioux	8,390	24.66
Green	André Davignon	1,224	3.60
Québec solidaire	Danielle Desmarais	776	2.28
Total valid votes		34,017	98.81
Total rejected ballots		410	1.19
Turnout		34,427	76.13
Electors on the lists		45,224	–

2003 Quebec general election
Party	Candidate	Votes	%
Liberal	Jean Rioux	12,106	39.15
Parti Québécois	Jean-Paul Bergeron	11,185	36.17
Action démocratique	Lucille Méthé	6,731	21.77
Bloc Pot	Michel Thiffeault	376	1.22
Green	Benoit Lapointe	298	0.96
UFP	Guillaume Tremblay	229	0.74
Total valid votes		30,925	98.55
Total rejected ballots		454	1.45
Turnout		31,379	73.75
Electors on the lists		42,547	–

1998 Quebec general election
Party	Candidate	Votes	%
Parti Québécois	Jean-Paul Bergeron	17,657	47.03
Liberal	Sylvain Lapointe	13,245	35.28
Action démocratique	Stéphanie Deslandes	6,412	17.08
Marxist–Leninist	André Davignon	227	0.60
Total valid votes		37,541	98.71
Total rejected ballots		492	1.29
Turnout		38,033	81.28
Electors on the lists		46,793	–

1995 Quebec referendum
Side	Votes	%
Oui	23,400	56.28
Non	18,178	43.72

1994 Quebec general election
Party	Candidate	Votes	%	±%
Parti Québécois	Richard Le Hir	15,604	43.41	
Liberal	Lyse Lafrance-Charlebois	14,140	39.34	
Action démocratique	Pierre Pellerin	4,122	11.47	
Independent	Wilfrid Laroche	1,004	2.79	
New Democratic Party	Jacques Rose	645	1.79	
Green	Serge Robert	428	1.19	–
Total valid votes		35,943	100.00	
Rejected and declined votes		808		
Turnout		36,751	82.96	
Electors on the lists		44,299		
Source: Official Results, Le Directeur général des élections du Québec

1992 Charlottetown Accord referendum
Side	Votes	%
Non	23,371	62.71
Oui	13,895	37.29

1989 Quebec general election
Party	Candidate	Votes	%
Liberal	Yvon Lafrance	16,617	51.07
Parti Québécois	Gilles Leduc	13,372	41.10
Green	Serge Robert	1,576	4.84
New Democratic	Denis Forget	971	2.98
Total valid votes		32,536	96.94
Total rejected ballots		1,027	3.06
Turnout		33,563	76.45
Electors on the lists		43,903	–

1985 Quebec general election
Party	Candidate	Votes	%
Liberal	Jacques Tremblay	18,353	55.02
Parti Québécois	Jacques Beauséjour	13,668	40.97
Progressive Conservative	Serge Corriveau	707	2.12
New Democratic	Joseph Salvo Rossi	495	1.48
Christian Socialism	Suzanne Gignac	136	0.41
Total valid votes		33,359	98.29
Total rejected ballots		579	1.71
Turnout		33,938	80.36
Electors on the lists		42,230	–

1981 Quebec general election
Party	Candidate	Votes	%	±%
Parti Québécois	Jacques Beauséjour	16,822	49.18	
Liberal	Jean Guité	14,883	43.51	
Union Nationale	Yvon Boulanger	2,498	7.30	–
Total valid votes		34,203	100.00	
Rejected and declined votes		363		
Turnout		34,566	85.63	
Electors on the lists		40,368		
Source: Official Results, Le Directeur général des élections du Québec

1980 Quebec referendum
Side	Votes	%
Non	22,102	61.59
Oui	13,786	38.41

1976 Quebec general election
Party	Candidate	Votes	%
Parti Québécois	Jacques Beauséjour	11,740	35.71
Union Nationale	Urbain Morin	10,207	31.04
Liberal	Jacques-Raymond Tremblay	9,129	27.77
Ralliement créditiste	Clovis Ménard	1,802	5.48
Total valid votes		32,878	98.31
Total rejected ballots		564	1.69
Turnout		33,442	87.38
Electors on the lists		38,271	–

1973 Quebec general election
Party	Candidate	Votes	%
Liberal	Jacques-Raymond Tremblay	10,688	37.39
Parti créditiste	Paul-Yvon Hamel	8,259	28.89
Parti Québécois	Marcel Pépin	5,373	18.80
Union Nationale	Alfred Croisetière	4,132	14.45
Independent	Laurent Brodeur	134	0.47
Total valid votes		28,586	98.63
Total rejected ballots		397	1.37
Turnout		28,983	84.13
Electors on the lists		34,451	–

1970 Quebec general election
Party	Candidate	Votes	%
Union Nationale	Alfred Croisetière	4,110	40.17
Liberal	J.-Bruno Normandin	3,342	32.67
Parti Québécois	Pierre Monet	2,036	19.90
Ralliement créditiste	Georges-Horace Binette	743	7.26
Total valid votes		10,231	98.76
Total rejected ballots		128	1.24
Turnout		10,359	90.07
Electors on the lists		11,501	–

1966 Quebec general election
Party	Candidate	Votes	%
Union Nationale	Alfred Croisetière	4,470	50.27
Liberal	Laurent Hamel	3,766	42.33
RIN	Jean Brault	431	4.84
Ralliement national	Maurice Papineau	229	2.57
Total valid votes		8,896	98.66
Total rejected ballots		121	1.34
Turnout		9,017	85.20
Electors on the lists		10,583	–

1962 Quebec general election
Party	Candidate	Votes	%
Liberal	Laurent Hamel	4,452	55.87
Union Nationale	Alfred Croisetière	3,516	44.13
Total valid votes		7,968	98.66
Total rejected ballots		67	0.83
Turnout		8,035	91.07
Electors on the lists		8,823	–

1960 Quebec general election
Party	Candidate	Votes	%
Liberal	Laurent Hamel	4,124	53.52
Union Nationale	Yvon Thuot	3,582	46.48
Total valid votes		7,706	98.29
Total rejected ballots		134	1.71
Turnout		7,840	92.81
Electors on the lists		8,447	–

1956 Quebec general election
Party	Candidate	Votes	%
Union Nationale	Yvon Thuot	3,903	57.22
Liberal	J.-Willie Masseau	2,918	42.78
Total valid votes		6,821	99.08
Total rejected ballots		63	0.92
Turnout		6,884	88.13
Electors on the lists		7,811	–

1952 Quebec general election
Party	Candidate	Votes	%
Union Nationale	Yvon Thuot	3,597	58.49
Liberal	Armand Goyette	2,553	41.51
Total valid votes		6,150	99.00
Total rejected ballots		62	1.00
Turnout		6,212	85.98
Electors on the lists		7,225	–

1948 Quebec general election
Party	Candidate	Votes	%
Union Nationale	Yvon Thuot	3,369	59.55
Liberal	Joseph-Lucien Benjamin	2,025	35.80
Union des électeurs	Joseph-Domina-Albert Raymond	228	4.03
Independent	Wilfrid-Albert Labelle	35	0.62
Total valid votes		5,657	97.65
Total rejected ballots		136	2.35
Turnout		5,793	86.71
Electors on the lists		6,681	–

1944 Quebec general election
Party	Candidate	Votes	%
Union Nationale	Yvon Thuot	1,910	38.81
Liberal	Émile Bonvouloir	1,484	30.15
Bloc populaire	Dollard Brisson	956	19.42
Independent	Armand Goyette	572	11.62
Total valid votes		4,922	99.35
Total rejected ballots		32	0.65
Turnout		4,954	82.43
Electors on the lists		6,010	–

1939 Quebec general election
Party	Candidate	Votes	%
Liberal	Émile Bonvouloir	1,146	47.26
Union Nationale	Lucien Lamoureux	1,112	45.86
Independent	Armand Goyette	167	6.89
Total valid votes		2,425	99.39
Total rejected ballots		15	0.61
Turnout		2,440	87.61
Electors on the lists		2,785	–

1936 Quebec general election
Party	Candidate	Votes	%
Liberal	Lucien Lamoureux	1,292	57.09
Union Nationale	Armand Racicot	971	42.91
Total valid votes		2,263	100.00
Turnout		2,263	86.51
Electors on the lists		2,616	–

1935 Quebec general election
Party	Candidate	Votes
Liberal	Lucien Lamoureux	Acclaimed
Electors on the lists		2,613

1931 Quebec general election
Party	Candidate	Votes	%
Liberal	Lucien Lamoureux	1,303	71.16
Conservative	Romauld Charbonneau	528	28.84
Total valid votes		1,831	98.02
Total rejected ballots		37	1.98
Turnout		1,868	79.02
Electors on the lists		2,364	–

1927 Quebec general election
Party	Candidate	Votes
Liberal	Lucien Lamoureux	Acclaimed
Electors on the lists		2,308

1923 Quebec general election
Party	Candidate	Votes	%
Liberal	Émile Bonvouloir	828	51.56
Liberal	Adélard Forget	778	48.44
Total valid votes		1,606	97.81
Total rejected ballots		36	2.19
Turnout		1,642	74.06
Electors on the lists		2,217	–

1919 Quebec general election
Party	Candidate	Votes	%
Liberal	Adélard Forget	822	47.03
Liberal	Joseph-Aldéric Benoît	707	40.45
Liberal	Zoël Fortier	219	12.53
Total valid votes		1,748	99.32
Total rejected ballots		12	0.68
Turnout		1,760	81.86
Electors on the lists		2,150	–

1916 Quebec general election
Party	Candidate	Votes
Liberal	Joseph-Aldéric Benoît	Acclaimed
Electors on the lists		2,215

1912 Quebec general election
Party	Candidate	Votes	%
Liberal	Joseph-Aldéric Benoît	926	72.57
Conservative	Ernest Huot	350	27.43
Total valid votes		1,276	99.07
Total rejected ballots		12	1.98
Turnout		1,288	53.03
Electors on the lists		2,429	–

1908 Quebec general election
Party	Candidate	Votes	%
Liberal	Joseph-Aldéric Benoît	1,095	83.46
Conservative	Romauld Labelle	217	16.54
Total valid votes		1,312	99.02
Total rejected ballots		13	0.98
Turnout		1,325	53.62
Electors on the lists		2,471	–

Quebec provincial by-election, 1906
Party	Candidate	Votes	%
Liberal	Joseph-Aldéric Benoît	1,057	53.98
Conservative	Charles-Salomon Roy	901	46.02
Total valid votes		1,958	98.94
Total rejected ballots		21	1.06
Turnout		1,979	79.03
Electors on the lists		2,504	–

1904 Quebec general election
Party	Candidate	Votes	%
Liberal	François Gosselin	1,021	53.12
Conservative	Charles-Salomon Roy	901	46.88
Total valid votes		1,922	99.12
Total rejected ballots		17	0.88
Turnout		1,939	77.53
Electors on the lists		2,501	–

1900 Quebec general election
Party	Candidate	Votes	%
Liberal	François Gosselin	1,018	55.09
Conservative	Charles-Salomon Roy	830	44.91
Total valid votes		1,848	99.04
Total rejected ballots		18	0.96
Turnout		1,866	72.13
Electors on the lists		2,587	–

1897 Quebec general election
Party	Candidate	Votes	%
Liberal	François Gosselin	1,044	74.52
Conservative	Étienne Poulin	357	25.48
Total valid votes		1,401	98.87
Total rejected ballots		16	1.13
Turnout		1,417	54.00
Electors on the lists		2,624	–

1892 Quebec general election
Party	Candidate	Votes	%
Liberal	François Gosselin	1,079	67.19
Conservative	David Lafond	527	32.81
Total valid votes		1,606	98.59
Total rejected ballots		23	1.41
Turnout		1,629	60.13
Electors on the lists		2,709	–

1890 Quebec general election
Party	Candidate	Votes	%
Liberal	François Gosselin	802	42.90
Liberal	Jacques-Émery Molleur	475	25.35
Liberal	Henry-H. Roy	325	17.34
Liberal	Philippe-Honoré Roy	270	14.41
Total valid votes		1,874	99.10
Total rejected ballots		17	0.90
Turnout		1,891	83.01
Electors on the lists		2,278	–

Quebec provincial by-election, 1887
Party	Candidate	Votes
Parti national	Georges Duhamel	Acclaimed

Quebec provincial by-election, 1886
Party	Candidate	Votes	%
Parti national	Georges Duhamel	1,007	64.43
Conservative	P.-S.-Pierre Lecompte	556	35.57
Total valid votes		1,563	100.00
Turnout		1,563	66.26
Electors on the lists		2,359	–

1886 Quebec general election
Party	Candidate	Votes
Liberal	Alexis-Louis Demers	Acclaimed
Electors on the lists		2,359

1892 Quebec general election
Party	Candidate	Votes	%
Liberal	François Gosselin	834	71.53
Conservative	A.-N. Charland	332	28.47
Total valid votes		1,166	97.98
Total rejected ballots		24	2.02
Turnout		1,190	47.09
Electors on the lists		2,527	–

1878 Quebec general election
Party	Candidate	Votes	%
Liberal	Louis Molleur	818	60.73
Conservative	Jules Fortin	529	39.27
Total valid votes		1,347	98.83
Total rejected ballots		16	1.17
Turnout		1,363	63.90
Electors on the lists		2,133	–

1875 Quebec general election
Party	Candidate	Votes
Liberal	Louis Molleur	Acclaimed
Electors on the lists		2,568

1871 Quebec general election
Party	Candidate	Votes	%
Liberal	Louis Molleur	973	72.13
Conservative	E.-L. de Bellefeuille	376	27.87
Total valid votes		1,349	100.00
Turnout		1,349	60.49
Electors on the lists		2,230	–

1867 Quebec general election
Party	Candidate	Votes	%
Liberal	Louis Molleur	1,037	67.60
Liberal	Alexandre Dufresne	497	32.40
Total valid votes		1,534	100.00
Turnout		1,534	66.04
Electors on the lists		2,323	–

== See also ==
- List of Quebec provincial electoral districts
- Canadian provincial electoral districts
