= Alfred Croisetière =

Canadian politician

Member of the Legislative Assembly of Quebec for Iberville
- In office 1966–1973
- Preceded by: Laurent Hamel
- Succeeded by: Jacques-Raymond Tremblay

Personal details
- Born: July 21, 1922 Winooski, Vermont
- Died: October 17, 2014 (aged 92) Iberville, Quebec, Canada
- Party: Union Nationale

Alfred Croisetière (July 21, 1922 – October 17, 2014) was a Canadian politician and a two-term Member of the Legislative Assembly of Quebec.

== Background ==
He was born on July 21, 1922, in Winooski, Vermont.

== Member of the legislature ==
Croisetière ran as a Union Nationale candidate in the 1962 election in the provincial district of Iberville. He lost against Liberal incumbent Laurent Hamel.

He was elected in the 1966 election and was re-elected in the 1970 election. He served as his party's Deputy House Whip from 1966 until his defeat against Liberal candidate Jacques-Raymond Tremblay in the 1973 election.

== City Councillor ==
Croisetière served as a city councillor in Iberville, Montérégie from 1975 to 1983.
