= Ferdinand David =

Ferdinand David may refer to:

- Ferdinand David (musician) (1810–1873), German violinist and composer
- Ferdinand David (politician) (1824–1883), Quebec politician
