= Bonvouloir =

Bonvouloir may refer to:

- Bonvouloir Islands in Papua New Guinea
- Émile Bonvouloir (1875-1969), Canadian politician
- Julien Alexandre Achard de Bonvouloir (1749-1783), French envoy to America
