= Jean-Paul Bergeron =

Canadian politician

Member of the National Assembly of Quebec for Iberville
- In office November 30, 1998 – April 14, 2003
- Preceded by: Richard Le Hir
- Succeeded by: Jean Rioux

Personal details
- Born: October 21, 1947 (age 78) Saint-Alexandre, Quebec
- Party: Parti Québécois
- Profession: Educator

Jean-Paul Bergeron (born October 21, 1947) is a Quebec politician. He previously served as the member for Iberville in the Quebec National Assembly as a member of the Parti Québécois from 1998 until 2003.

== Biography ==
Bergeron was born in Saint-Alexandre, Quebec. He earned his bachelor's degree in pedagogy from the Université de Montréal in 1969. He holds a certificate in computer science, a master's degree in education and a Doctorate in mathematics from the Université du Québec à Montréal. Bergeron was a high school mathematics teacher from and a lecturer at TÉLUQ.

== Political career ==
Bergeron ran in the 1998 Quebec provincial election for the seat of Iberville that was left open by the decision of former Cabinet Minister Richard Le Hir to not run. He won easily. He served as a backbench supporter in the governments of Lucien Bouchard and Bernard Landry.

He was defeated in the 2003 election by Jean Rioux of the Quebec Liberal Party by less than 1,000 votes.

Bergeron attempted to run again for Iberville in 2007 election but lost the PQ nomination to Marie Bouillé 168–156.

== Electoral record ==
=== Provincial ===
2003 Quebec general election
Party	Candidate	Votes	%
Liberal	Jean Rioux	12,106	39.15
Parti Québécois	Jean-Paul Bergeron	11,185	36.17
Action démocratique	Lucille Méthé	6,731	21.77
Bloc Pot	Michel Thiffeault	376	1.22
Green	Benoit Lapointe	298	0.96
UFP	Guillaume Tremblay	229	0.74
Total valid votes		30,925	98.55
Total rejected ballots		454	1.45
Turnout		31,379	73.75
Electors on the lists		42,547	–

1998 Quebec general election
Party	Candidate	Votes	%
Parti Québécois	Jean-Paul Bergeron	17,657	47.03
Liberal	Sylvain Lapointe	13,245	35.28
Action démocratique	Stéphanie Deslandes	6,412	17.08
Marxist–Leninist	André Davignon	227	0.60
Total valid votes		37,541	98.71
Total rejected ballots		492	1.29
Turnout		38,033	81.28
Electors on the lists		46,793	–
