= Victor Châteauvert =

Canadian politician

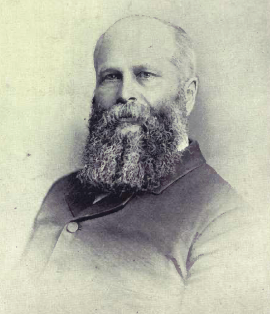

Member of the Legislative Assembly of Quebec for Québec-Centre
- In office 1892–1897
- Preceded by: Rémi-Ferdinand Rinfret
- Succeeded by: Amédée Robitaille

Personal details
- Born: 12 March 1841 Quebec City, Canada East
- Died: 6 November 1920 (aged 79) Quebec City, Ontario
- Party: Conservative

Victor Châteauvert (12 March 1841 – 6 November 1920) was a Canadian politician. He married Virginie Dussault. He was associated to Gaspard Lemoine (married to Emma Renaud) in the company J.B. Renaud in Quebec City.

He was the unsuccessful Conservative candidate in the 1891 federal election for the riding of Quebec-Centre. He was elected to the Legislative Assembly of Quebec for the identically named provincial riding of Québec-Centre in the 1892 Quebec election. A Conservative, he was defeated in 1897. He was also defeated in the 1900 federal election. He 1902 he was member of the board of the Auditorium de Québec (now le Capitole de Québec)with S.Napoléon Parent (mayor), William Price, John Sharples, H. M. Price, Goerges Tanguay and Georges Thompson. He is the father of Alexandre Châteauvert, who became vice-president of J. B. Renaud after the death of his father. He is also the father of Victor Châteauvert Jr. He was the grandfather of both Jean-Richard Châteauvert (son of Alexandre Châteauvert) and Françoise Châteauvert (daughter of Victor Châteauvert and Flore Derouin), one of whose grandsons is Jean-Nicolas De Surmont. Françoise Châteauvert was a close friend of Yvonne Lemoine, granddaughter of Gaspard Lemoine and the family of Jean Senecal, Guy Des Rivières, Gilles Lamontagne and Jean Lesage. Françoise Châteauvert used also to do horse-riding with Gilles Turcot in the 1930s.
