= Chicoutimi-Saguenay =

Chicoutimi-Saguenay may refer to:

- Chicoutimi—Saguenay (federal electoral district)
- Chicoutimi-Saguenay (provincial electoral district)
