= Philippe Honoré =

Philippe Honoré may refer to:

- Philippe Honoré (cartoonist) (1941–2015), French cartoonist
- Philippe Honoré (violinist) (born 1967), French violinist

== See also ==
- Philippe-Honoré Roy (1847–1910), lawyer and political figure in Quebec
