= Louis Molleur =

Canadian politician

Member of the Legislative Assembly of Quebec for Iberville
- In office 1867–1881
- Succeeded by: Alexis-Louis Demers

Personal details
- Born: July 7, 1828 L'Acadie, Lower Canada
- Died: August 17, 1904 (aged 76) Saint-Jean-sur-Richelieu, Quebec
- Party: Liberal

Louis Molleur (July 7, 1828 – August 17, 1904) was an educator, businessman and political figure in Quebec. He represented Iberville in the Legislative Assembly of Quebec from 1867 to 1881 as a Liberal.

He was born in L’Acadie, Lower Canada, the son of Louis Molleur and Marie-Angèle Mailloux, and was educated there. Molleur taught school from 1848 to 1853. In 1853, he established himself as a merchant at Saint-Valentin and then later Henryville and finally Saint-Jean-sur-Richelieu. He was married twice: to his cousin Aurélie Molleur in 1851 and to Elmina Mathieu in 1898. Molleur was a director of the Canada Agricultural Insurance Company and helped found the Permanent Building Society of the District of Iberville and the Banque de Saint-Jean. He died in Saint-Jean-sur-Richelieu at the age of 76.

His daughter Auglore married Philippe-Honoré Roy.
