= Godfroy Langlois =

Canadian politician

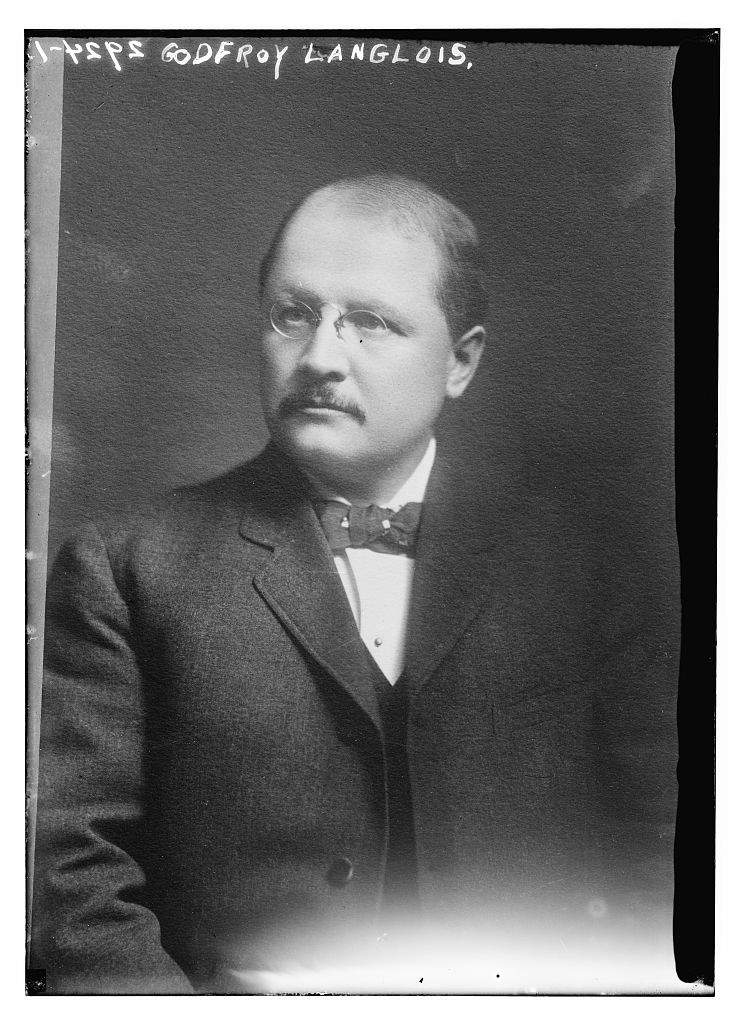

Member of the Legislative Assembly of Quebec for Montréal division no. 3
- In office 1904–1912
- Preceded by: Henri-Benjamin Rainville
- Succeeded by: District was abolished in 1912

Member of the Legislative Assembly of Quebec for Montréal–Saint-Louis
- In office 1912–1916
- Preceded by: District was created in 1912
- Succeeded by: Peter Bercovitch

Personal details
- Born: 26 December 1866 Sainte-Scholastique (Mirabel), Canada East
- Died: 6 April 1928 (aged 61) Brussels, Belgium
- Party: Liberal

Godfroy Langlois (French pronunciation: [ɡɔdfʁwa lɑ̃ɡlwa]; 26 December 1866 – 6 April 1928) was a politician, a journalist and a lawyer in Quebec. He was a member of the Legislative Assembly of Quebec for the Liberal Party of Quebec.

== Biography ==
A native of Sainte-Scholastique (today part of Mirabel), he studied at the Séminaire de Sainte-Thérèse, the College of St. Laurent and Laval University where he studied law. Early on, he joined the Quebec Bar in 1886, but then turned to journalism. In 1890 he began publishing The Echo of Two Mountains. Anticlerical, the newspaper got into trouble and had to change its name in 1892 to Freedom. He joined the editorial staff of La Patrie, where he was editor from 1897 to 1903. He chaired the National Club of Montreal, he was elected Liberal MP in Montréal division no. 3 in 1904 and 1908, and in Montreal-Saint-Louis in 1912. He worked for the legalization of trade unions and various other liberal measures. In 1914, he became the official representative of the Quebec government in Brussels, capital of Belgium. He kept that post until his death on April 6, 1928.
