= Albert William Atwater =

Canadian politician

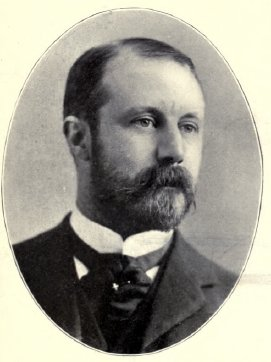

Member of the Legislative Assembly of Quebec for Montréal division no. 4
- In office 1896–1900
- Preceded by: Alexander Webb Morris
- Succeeded by: James Cochrane

Personal details
- Born: May 19, 1856 Montreal, Canada East
- Died: November 2, 1929 (aged 73) Intra, Italy

Albert William Atwater (May 19, 1856 – November 2, 1929) was a Canadian politician.

Born in Montreal, the son of Albert William Atwater and Julia Eliza Brush, Atwater was educated at the Montreal High School and McGill University. He was called to the Quebec Bar in 1881 and was created a Queen's Counsel in 1889. A lawyer, he was a member of the Montreal City Council for Saint-Antoine from February to May 1896. He was elected with opposition to the Legislative Assembly of Quebec in an 1896 by-election for the riding of Montréal division no. 4. A Conservative, he was re-elected in 1897. From 1896 to 1897, he was the Treasurer of the Province of Quebec. He was defeated in 1900.

He was the grand-nephew of Edwin Atwater.
