= Edmund James Flynn =

Premier of Quebec from 1896 to 1897

The Honourable Edmund James Flynn
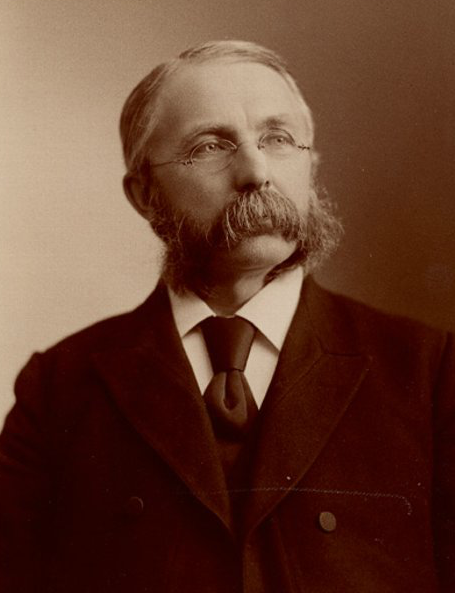

10th Premier of Quebec
- In office May 11, 1896 – May 24, 1897
- Monarch: Victoria
- Lieutenant Governor: Joseph-Adolphe Chapleau
- Preceded by: Louis-Olivier Taillon
- Succeeded by: Félix-Gabriel Marchand

Member of the Legislative Assembly of Quebec for Gaspé
- In office May 1, 1878 – June 17, 1890
- Preceded by: Pierre-Étienne Fortin
- Succeeded by: Achille-Ferdinand Carrier
- In office March 8, 1892 – December 7, 1900
- Preceded by: Achille-Ferdinand Carrier
- Succeeded by: Xavier Kennedy

Member of the Legislative Assembly of Quebec for Nicolet
- In office December 7, 1900 – November 25, 1904
- Preceded by: Georges Ball
- Succeeded by: Alfred Marchildon

Leader of the Official Opposition of Quebec
- In office May 24, 1897 – November 25, 1904
- Preceded by: Félix-Gabriel Marchand
- Succeeded by: Pierre-Évariste Leblanc

Personal details
- Born: November 16, 1847 Percé, Canada East
- Died: June 7, 1927 (aged 79) Quebec City, Quebec
- Resting place: Cimetière Notre-Dame-de-Belmont
- Party: Liberal; Conservative
- Spouses: Augustine Côté (m. 1875) Marie-Cécile Pouliot (m. 1912)
- Relations: Jacques Flynn, grandson
- Children: 11
- Education: Université Laval
- Occupation: Lawyer, professor, and judge
- Profession: Politician

Edmund James Flynn (November 16, 1847 – June 7, 1927) was a Canadian lawyer, politician and the tenth premier of Quebec, from 1896 to 1897.

== Background ==
Flynn, the son of Jacques Flynn and Elizabeth Tostevin, was born at Percé on November 16, 1847. He studied law at the Université Laval in Quebec City from 1871 to 1873, obtaining his degree with distinction. On 16 Sept. 1873 he was called to the bar of the province of Quebec and he took up his profession in the region where he was born.

== Member of the legislature ==
Flynn became the Liberal Member of the Legislative Assembly (MLA) for the district of Gaspé in 1878. He crossed the floor in 1879 and joined the Conservative Party, a very controversial move at that time, an action which was shocking in the Gaspé riding where he was a favourite son, and a gallant chivalric-like orator on campaign. Flynn won re-election each time until 1890. In that year, Honoré Mercier's Parti National won a landslide victory and Flynn lost his seat. Flynn ran for the federal Conservatives in the 1891 federal election for the riding of Quebec County, but lost. Flynn was sent back to the provincial legislature in 1892 and was re-elected in 1897.

== Conservative Leader ==
He succeeded Louis-Olivier Taillon as Conservative Leader, became the tenth Premier of Quebec in 1896. In office he was concerned with public works, Crown Land adjudication and improving the quality of primary education and the compensation for schoolmasters. This short tenure marked the final time that the Conservative Party held power in Quebec.

In the 1897, his government suffered electoral defeat to the more popular Félix-Gabriel Marchand. During the remainder of his term as a legislator, Flynn served as Leader of the Opposition.

== Judge ==
Flynn had taught a course in Roman law at Université Laval in Quebec City from the late 1870s. Flynn had been appointed a judge of the Superior Court for the district of Beauce in June 1914. In June 1920 he was appointed Judge of the Court of King's Bench, an office he held for the rest of his life. Flynn died at Quebec City, June 7, 1927 and his remains were interred in the cimetière Notre-Dame-de-Belmont, Sainte-Foy, Quebec.

A grandson was the Canadian politician Jacques Flynn.

== Electoral record ==
1891 Canadian federal election: Quebec County
Party	Candidate	Votes
Liberal	Jules-Joseph-Taschereau Frémont	1,692
Conservative	Edmund James Flynn	1,352

== See also ==
- List of Gaspésiens
- List of Canadian politicians who have crossed the floor
- List of Quebec general elections
- History of Quebec
