= Richard Le Hir =

Canadian politician

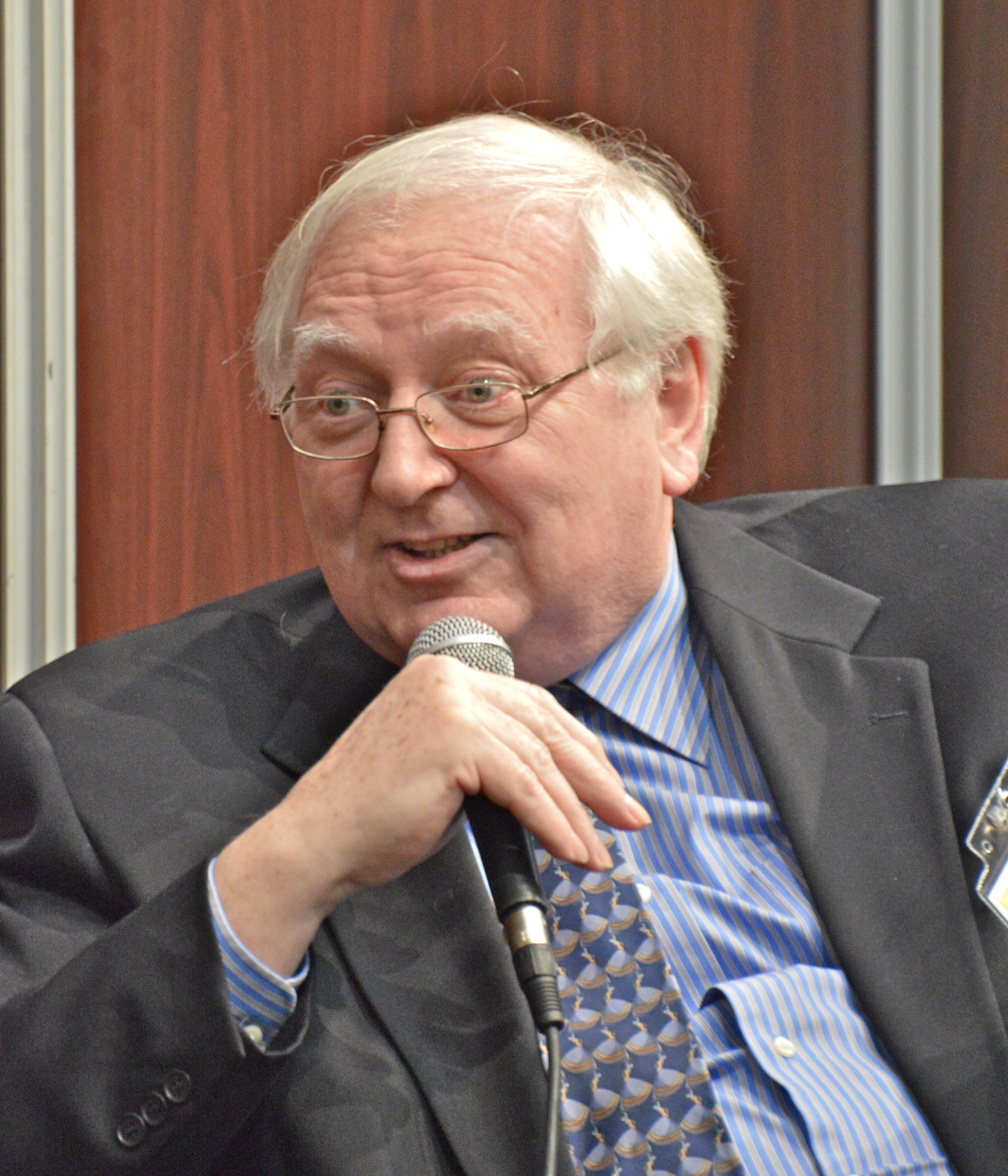

Quebec MNA for Iberville
- In office 1994–1998

Personal details
- Born: July 9, 1947 Versailles, France
- Died: November 4, 2018 (aged 71) Montreal, Quebec, Canada
- Party: Parti Québécois

Richard Le Hir (July 9, 1947 – November 4, 2018) was a French-born Canadian politician, lawyer and management consultant living in Quebec. He represented Iberville in the National Assembly of Quebec as a member of the Parti Québécois and served in the Quebec cabinet.

The son of Gaston Le Hir and Henriette Rochette, both teachers, he was born in Versailles. Le Hir attended the Collège Stanislas in Montreal. He studied literature at the University of Paris, Spanish studies at the University of Barcelona and law at the Université de Montréal. In 1974, he was admitted to the Bar of Quebec.

Le Hir served in management positions in various companies, including Esso, Laurentian Group and Texaco Canada. From 1989 to 1994, he was president/director general of the Association des manufacturiers du Québec.

He was elected to the National Assembly in the 1994 general election. From September 26, 1994, to November 9, 1995, he served as minister responsible for restructuring in the cabinet of Jacques Parizeau. Le Hir resigned from the Parti Québécois caucus on December 8, 1995, following the defeat of the 1995 Quebec referendum and sat as an independent from April 30, 1996, till the end of his term. He did not run for reelection in 1998.

After leaving politics, he worked as a management consultant and was president of the Shipping Federation of Canada.

He contributed to the Quebec political web site Vigile Quebec. He also published a number of books on political subjects: La prochaine étape, le défi de la légitimité (1997), Desmarais: la dépossession tranquille (2012) and Charles Sirois, l'homme derrière François Legault (2013).

Le Hir died in Montreal at the age of 71 several days after suffering a stroke at his home there.

Preceded by Yvon Lafrance (ADQ)	MNA, District of Iberville; 1994–1998	Succeeded by Jean-Paul Bergeron (PQ)
