= Onésime Côté =

Canadian politician

Onésime Côté (August 13, 1840 – October 23, 1911) was a general merchant and political figure in Quebec who represented Chicoutimi-Saguenay in the Legislative Assembly of Quebec from 1890 to 1892 as a member of the Parti National.

He was born in Baie-Saint-Paul, Lower Canada, the son of Désiré Côté and Édith Perron, and established himself in business at Bagotville. In 1867, he married Marie-Philomène-Angèle Maltais. Côté was mayor of the northwest division of Bagot township in 1871 and 1872.

He was elected in the 1890 Quebec general election, but was defeated in his re-election bid in 1892. Côté died in Bagotville at the age of 71.
