= John Thomas Finnie =

Canadian physician and politician

Member of the Legislative Assembly of Quebec for Montréal division no. 4
- In office 1908–1912
- Preceded by: George Washington Stephens, Jr.
- Succeeded by: District was abolished in 1912

Member of the Legislative Assembly of Quebec for Montréal–Saint-Laurent
- In office 1912–1918
- Preceded by: District was created in 1912
- Succeeded by: Henry Miles

Personal details
- Born: September 14, 1847 Peterhead, Scotland
- Died: February 10, 1925 (aged 77) Montreal, Quebec
- Party: Liberal

John Thomas Finnie (September 14, 1847 – February 10, 1925) was a Canadian physician and politician.

Born in Peterhead, Scotland, Finnie was educated there and at the High School of Montreal, then at McGill College. He qualified as a doctor and was admitted to the Royal College of Surgeons of Edinburgh. He married Amelia Ann Healy, a daughter of Christopher Healy.

Finnie was elected to the Legislative Assembly of Quebec for Montréal division no. 4 in 1908. A Liberal, he was re-elected for the riding of Montréal–Saint-Laurent in 1912 and 1916. He resigned in 1918 when he became Collector of Provincial Revenue for the District of Montreal.

He died in Montreal in 1925.
