= Camille Pellerin-Forget =

Quebec politician and physiotherapist

Camille Pellerin-Forget MNA

Member of the National Assembly for Iberville
- Incumbent
- Assumed office October 5, 2026
- Preceded by: Audrey Bogemans

Personal details
- Party: Parti Québécois

Camille Pellerin-Forget is a Quebec politician who was the elected to the National Assembly of Quebec for Iberville in the 2026 Quebec general election as a member of the Parti Québécois. From 2022 to 2025, she was president of the political commission and co-spokesperson for health, seniors and family of the Parti Québécois. She is a physiotherapist by profession.
