= Joseph-Jean-Baptiste Gosselin =

Canadian politician

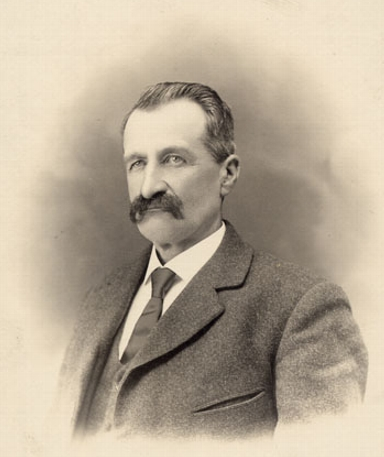

Member of the Legislative Council of Quebec for Bedford
- In office January 20, 1919 – May 16, 1929
- Preceded by: Ernest De Varennes
- Succeeded by: Jacob Nicol

Member of the Legislative Assembly of Quebec for Missisquoi
- In office 1900–1919
- Preceded by: Cédric Lemoine Cotton
- Succeeded by: Alexandre Saurette

Personal details
- Born: November 22, 1848 Saint-Athanase, Canada East
- Died: May 16, 1929 (aged 80) Notre-Dame-de-Stanbridge, Quebec
- Party: Liberal
- Relations: François Gosselin, brother

Joseph-Jean-Baptiste Gosselin (November 22, 1848 – May 16, 1929) was a merchant and political figure in Quebec. He represented Missisquoi in the Legislative Assembly of Quebec from 1900 to 1919 as a Liberal.

He was born in Saint-Athanase, Canada East, the son of François Gosselin and Onésime Nadeau. Gosselin married Rose-de-Lima Gauthier in 1878. In 1886, he established a general store at Notre-Dame-de-Stanbridge. He also ran a spinning mill and took part in hay exports. Gosselin was president of the school board and served as mayor of Notre-Dame-de-Stanbridge. In 1919, he was named to the Legislative Council of Quebec for the Bedford division. Gosselin died in office in Notre-Dame-de-Stanbridge at the age of 80.

His brother, François also served in the Quebec assembly.
