= André Riedl =

Canadian politician

Andre Riedl

MNA for Iberville
- In office April 25, 2007 – November 5, 2008
- Preceded by: Jean Rioux
- Succeeded by: Marie Bouillé

Personal details
- Born: October 10, 1940 Montreal, Quebec
- Died: April 5, 2023 (aged 82) Saint-Hyacinthe, Quebec
- Party: ADQ → Liberal
- Spouse: Louise Faubert

André Riedl (October 10, 1940 - April 5, 2023) was a politician from Quebec, Canada. He was a Member of the National Assembly for the electoral district of Iberville from 2007 to 2008.

Born in the Saint-Henri neighbourhood in Montreal on October 10, 1940, Riedl went on a training course in 1957 with the Canadian Forces. He was later for nine years the president of BOC Gaz Canada, a gas and equipment supplier. He also did international public speaking and was involved in the Missisquoi and Magog-Orford Chamber of Commerce. He once said that "unions are a necessary evil".

Riedl was first elected in the 2007 election as a member of the Action démocratique du Québec (ADQ) with 42% of the vote. Liberal incumbent Jean Rioux finished third with 25% of the vote. Riedl took office on April 12, 2007. On October 23, 2008, Riedl crossed the floor to the governing Liberal Party.
