= James Cochrane (politician) =

Canadian politician

Mayor James Cochrane
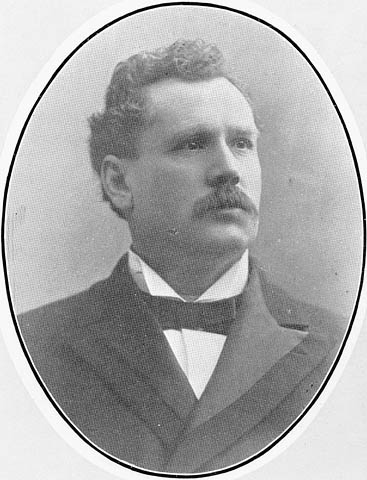
- Mayor James Cochrane

26th Mayor of Montreal
- In office 1902–1904
- Preceded by: Raymond Préfontaine
- Succeeded by: Hormidas Laporte

Member of the Legislative Assembly of Quebec for Montréal division no. 4
- In office 1900–1905
- Preceded by: Albert William Atwater
- Succeeded by: George Washington Stephens Jr.

Personal details
- Born: 15 September 1852 Kincardine, Scotland, United Kingdom
- Died: 28 May 1905 (aged 52) Montreal, Quebec, Canada
- Profession: General contractor

James Cochrane (15 September 1852 – 28 May 1905) was a Canadian construction contractor and politician, the Mayor of Montreal, Quebec between 1902 and 1904.

Cochrane was educated at the British Canadian School and Collegiate College, then began a career in construction-related activity. He was also a Canadian soldier deployed to fight the North-West Rebellion in 1885.

Besides his term as Mayor, Cochrane also served in provincial politics winning the Montréal division no. 4 riding in the 1900 and 1904 Quebec elections. He served in the 10th Legislative Assembly of Quebec concurrent with his service as Montreal Mayor. He was re-elected to a second provincial term in the 11th Assembly, but died in office at Montreal on 28 May 1905.
