= Joseph-Eugène Rhéault =

Canadian politician

Member of the Legislative Assembly of Quebec for Wolfe
- In office 1919–1921
- Preceded by: Napoléon-Pierre Tanguay
- Succeeded by: Joseph-Pierre-Cyrénus Lemieux

Personal details
- Born: March 7, 1856 Arthabaska, Canada East
- Died: April 5, 1921 (aged 65) Disraëli, Quebec
- Party: Liberal

Joseph-Eugène Rhéault (March 7, 1856 – April 5, 1921) was a Canadian provincial politician. He was the Liberal member of the Legislative Assembly of Quebec for Wolfe from 1919 until his death in 1921. He was also mayor of Disraëli from 1905 to 1910.
