= Honoré Petit =

Canadian politician

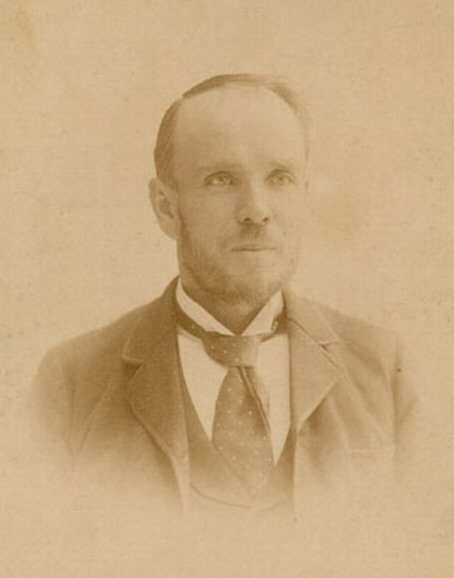

Member of the Legislative Assembly of Quebec for Chicoutimi-Saguenay
- In office 1892–1912
- Preceded by: Onésime Côté
- Succeeded by: District was abolished in 1912

Member of the Legislative Assembly of Quebec for Chicoutimi
- In office 1912–1919
- Preceded by: District was created in 1912
- Succeeded by: Joseph-Arthur Gaudrault

Personal details
- Born: January 26, 1847 Cap-Santé, Canada East
- Died: December 1, 1922 (aged 75) Chicoutimi, Quebec

Honoré Petit (January 26, 1847 – December 1, 1922) was a farmer, lumberman and political figure in Quebec. He represented Chicoutimi-Saguenay from 1892 to 1912 as a Conservative and Chicoutimi from 1912 to 1919 as a Liberal in the Legislative Assembly of Quebec.

He was born in Cap-Santé, Canada East, the son of Jean-Baptiste Petit and Marguerite Doré, and was educated at Cap-Santé, Neuville and Lévis. He worked for the Price lumber company for 26 years. Petit was mayor of Sainte-Anne-de-Chicoutimi and warden for Chicoutimi County. He was defeated by Onésime Côté when he ran for a seat in the Quebec assembly in 1890. Petit was defeated when he ran for reelection in 1919. He died three years later in Chicoutimi at the age of 74.
