= Ernest Choquette =

Canadian politician

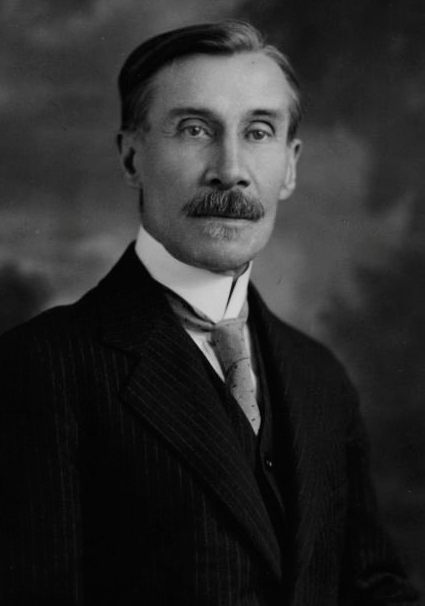

Member of the Legislative Council of Quebec for Rougemont
- In office 1910–1941
- Preceded by: François Gosselin
- Succeeded by: Wilfrid Bovey

Personal details
- Born: 18 November 1862 Saint-Mathieu-de-Beloeil, Canada East
- Died: 29 March 1941 (aged 78) Westmount, Quebec
- Party: Liberal
- Relations: Jérôme Choquette, grandson Philippe-Auguste Choquette, brother Fernand Choquette, nephew

Ernest Choquette (18 November 1862 – 29 March 1941) was a Canadian physician, novelist, and politician.

Born in Saint-Mathieu-de-Beloeil, Canada East, Choquette studied medicine at the Université de Laval à Montréal (now called Université de Montréal). A physician, he practised medicine in Saint-Hilaire, Quebec. An author, some of his works include Les Ribaud, une idylle de 37 (1898), Claude Paysan (1899), Carabinades (1900), La Terre (1916), and Madeleine et la Bouée (1927). He also wrote for La Presse and La Patrie. He was made a Fellow of the Royal Society of Canada in 1911.

Choquette was the mayor of Saint-Hilaire before being appointed to the Legislative Council of Quebec for the Rougemont division in 1910. A Liberal, he served until his death in Westmount, Quebec in 1941.
