= Jean Rioux =

Canadian politician

Parliamentary Secretary to the Minister of National Defence
- In office January 30, 2017 – August 31, 2018
- Minister: Harjit Sajjan
- Preceded by: John McKay
- Succeeded by: Serge Cormier

Member of Parliament for Saint-Jean
- In office October 19, 2015 – September 11, 2019
- Preceded by: Tarik Brahmi
- Succeeded by: Christine Normandin

Member of the National Assembly of Québec for Iberville
- In office April 14, 2003 – April 25, 2007
- Preceded by: Jean-Paul Bergeron
- Succeeded by: André Riedl

Personal details
- Born: June 9, 1953 (age 73) Trois-Rivières, Quebec, Canada
- Party: Liberal
- Other political affiliations: Quebec Liberal

Jean Rioux (French pronunciation: [ʒɑ̃ ʁju]; born June 9, 1953) is a Canadian politician, educator and businessman who served as the member of Parliament for Saint-Jean as a member of the Liberal Party from 2015 until 2019. He previously represented Iberville in the Quebec National Assembly from 2003 to 2007 as a Liberal.

== Early life ==
He was born in Trois-Rivières, Quebec, the son of Richard Rioux and Janine Vincent, and was educated at the Université du Québec à Trois-Rivières and the Université Laval. Rioux taught history and economics in Marcellin-Champagnat secondary school in Iberville.

== Political career ==
Rioux served on the municipal council for Iberville from 1991 to 1995 and was mayor from 1995 to 2001. Rioux was elected to the National Assembly of Quebec in Iberville the 2003 general election but was defeated by André Riedl of the Action démocratique du Québec when he ran for reelection in 2007.

Rioux stood as the Liberal Party's candidate for Saint-Jean in the 2015 federal election, and was elected in the New Democrat open seat.

Rioux was defeated at the 2019 federal election by the Bloc Québécois candidate Christine Normandin on a large swing.

== Electoral record ==
=== Federal ===
2019 Canadian federal election: Saint-Jean
| Party | Candidate | Votes | % | ±% | Expenditures |
|---|---|---|---|---|---|
| Bloc Québécois | Christine Normandin | 27,750 | 44.8 | +19.99 | $14,561.23 |
| Liberal | Jean Rioux | 18,906 | 30.6 | -2.56 | $111,054.31 |
| Conservative | Martin Thibert | 6,612 | 10.7 | -0.15 | $12,932.62 |
| New Democratic | Chantal Reeves | 4,794 | 7.7 | -21.37 | $0.10 |
| Green | André-Philippe Chenail | 3,127 | 5.1 | +2.98 | $2,436.80 |
| People's | Marc Hivon | 397 | 0.6 | – | none listed |
| Indépendance du Québec | Yvon Savary | 289 | 0.5 | – | $137.94 |
| Total valid votes/expense limit | | 61,875 | 100.0 | | |
| Total rejected ballots | | 1,241 | | | |
| Turnout | | 63,116 | | | |
| Eligible voters | | 91,035 | | | |
| Population | | 111,190 | | | |
| Bloc Québécois gain from Liberal | | Swing | | +11.28 | |
Source: Elections Canada

2015 Canadian federal election
| Party | Candidate | Votes | % | ±% | Expenditures |
|---|---|---|---|---|---|
| Liberal | Jean Rioux | 20,022 | 33.16 | +24.32 | – |
| New Democratic | Hans Marotte | 17,555 | 29.07 | -18.40 | – |
| Bloc Québécois | Denis Hurtubise | 14,979 | 24.81 | -5.69 | – |
| Conservative | Stéphane Guinta | 6,549 | 10.85 | +0.18 | – |
| Green | Marilyn Redivo | 1,281 | 2.12 | -0.40 | – |
| Total valid votes/Expense limit | | 60,386 | 100.00; | | $228,390.29 |
| Total rejected ballots | | 1,231 | 2.00 | – | |
| Turnout | | 61,617 | 69.69 | – | |
| Eligible voters | | 88,414 | | | |
| Liberal gain from New Democratic | | Swing | | +21.36 | |
Source: Elections Canada

=== Provincial ===
2007 Quebec general election
| Party | Candidate | Votes | % |
|---|---|---|---|
| Action démocratique | André Riedl | 14,365 | 42.23 |
| Parti Québécois | Marie Bouillé | 9,262 | 27.23 |
| Liberal | Jean Rioux | 8,390 | 24.66 |
| Green | André Davignon | 1,224 | 3.60 |
| Québec solidaire | Danielle Desmarais | 776 | 2.28 |
| Total valid votes | | 34,017 | 98.81 |
| Total rejected ballots | | 410 | 1.19 |
| Turnout | | 34,427 | 76.13 |
| Electors on the lists | | 45,224 | – |

2003 Quebec general election
| Party | Candidate | Votes | % |
|---|---|---|---|
| Liberal | Jean Rioux | 12,106 | 39.15 |
| Parti Québécois | Jean-Paul Bergeron | 11,185 | 36.17 |
| Action démocratique | Lucille Méthé | 6,731 | 21.77 |
| Bloc Pot | Michel Thiffeault | 376 | 1.22 |
| Green | Benoit Lapointe | 298 | 0.96 |
| UFP | Guillaume Tremblay | 229 | 0.74 |
| Total valid votes | | 30,925 | 98.55 |
| Total rejected ballots | | 454 | 1.45 |
| Turnout | | 31,379 | 73.75 |
| Electors on the lists | | 42,547 | – |
