= Audrey Bogemans =

Canadian politician

Member of the National Assembly of Quebec for Iberville
- In office October 3, 2022 – October 5, 2026
- Preceded by: Claire Samson
- Succeeded by: Camille Pellerin-Forget

Personal details
- Born: 1989 (age 36–37) Saint-Sébastien, Quebec
- Party: Coalition Avenir Québec

Audrey Bogemans is a Canadian politician, who was elected to the National Assembly of Quebec in the 2022 Quebec general election. She represented the riding of Iberville as a member of the Coalition Avenir Québec. She endorsed Christine Fréchette to become the next leader of the Coalition Avenir Québec after François Legault.

== Electoral record ==
2022 Quebec general election: Iberville
Party	Candidate	Votes	%	±%
Coalition Avenir Québec	Audrey Bogemans	18,223	53.15	+5.53
Parti Québécois	Jean-Alexandre Côté	5,227	15.24	-2.30
Québec solidaire	Philippe Jetten-Vigeant	4,703	13.72	-3.60
Conservative	Anne Casabonne	3,863	11.27	+9.52
Liberal	Steve Trinque	1,934	5.64	-6.66
Climat Québec	Philippe Brassard	257	0.75	–
Démocratie directe	Jean-Charles Cléroux	81	0.24	–
Total valid votes		34,288	98.38	–
Total rejected ballots		564	1.62	-0.43
Turnout		34,852	70.23	-0.65
Electors on the lists		49,629	–	–
Coalition Avenir Québec hold		Swing		+3.92
