= Paschal Dumais =

Canadian politician

Paschal Dumais (September 11, 1798 – June 9, 1873) was a notary and political figure in Quebec. He represented Rimouski in the Legislative Assembly of Lower Canada from 1830 to 1831.

== Biography ==
He was born in Rivière-Ouelle, Lower Canada, the son of Vincent Dumais and Modeste Langlais. Dumais apprenticed in law at Rivière-Ouelle and Quebec City, qualified to practise as a notary in 1819 and set up practice at Cacouna, later moving to Kamouraska. In 1832, he married Éléonore Couillard. He was recorder for the Commissioner's Court, was associate registrar for Rimouski County and secretary-treasurer for the school board. He also was a representative for the Equitable Fire Insurance Company. His election in 1830 was overturned in December of the following year. He died in Kamouraska at the age of 74.

His son Séverin later served in the Quebec assembly.
