= Claire Samson =

Canadian politician

Member of the National Assembly of Quebec for Iberville
- In office April 7, 2014 – August 28, 2022
- Preceded by: Marie Bouillé
- Succeeded by: Audrey Bogemans

Personal details
- Born: April 12, 1955 (age 71)
- Party: Conservative Party of Quebec
- Other political affiliations: Coalition Avenir Québec (2014–2021)

Claire Samson (born April 12, 1955) is a Canadian politician in Quebec, who was elected to the National Assembly of Quebec in the 2014 election. She was elected to represent the electoral district of Iberville as a member of the Coalition Avenir Québec. She was also the party's candidate in Iberville in the 2012 election.

Within weeks of being re-elected in the 2018 election, Samson publicly announced that she was considering quitting politics, both for health reasons and because she felt snubbed by premier François Legault in not having been offered a cabinet position despite having been entrusted with a highly visible role as a party spokesperson during the election campaign.

On June 15, 2021, Samson was removed from the CAQ caucus after giving a $100 donation to the Conservative Party of Quebec, led by Éric Duhaime. On June 18, 2021, she officially joined the Conservative Party of Quebec to become its first sitting MNA.

== Electoral record ==
2018 Quebec general election: Iberville
Party	Candidate	Votes	%	±%
Coalition Avenir Québec	Claire Samson	15,892	47.62	+13.39
Parti Québécois	Nicolas Dionne	5,857	17.55	-13.95
Québec solidaire	Philippe Jetten-Vigeant	5,779	17.32	+10.3
Liberal	Mylène Gaudreau	4,106	12.3	-14.14
Green	Michelle Kolatschek	631	1.89	
Conservative	Serge Benoit	583	1.75	
New Democratic	Marc-André Renaud	269	0.81	
Bloc Pot	Dany Desjardins	258	0.77	
Total valid votes		33,375	97.95	
Total rejected ballots		697	2.05	
Turnout		34,072	70.88	
Eligible voters		48,072		
Coalition Avenir Québec hold		Swing		+13.67
Source(s) "Rapport des résultats officiels du scrutin". Élections Québec.
