= Napoléon-Pierre Tanguay =

Canadian politician

Member of the Legislative Assembly of Quebec for Wolfe
- In office 1904–1919
- Preceded by: Jérôme-Adolphe Chicoyne
- Succeeded by: Joseph-Eugène Rhéault

Personal details
- Born: November 8, 1862 Weedon, Canada East
- Died: February 25, 1927 (aged 64) Tampa, Florida, United States
- Party: Liberal
- Spouse: Sara Demers (m. 1883)
- Parents: Charles Tanguay; Zéphirine Pariseau

Napoléon-Pierre Tanguay (November 8, 1862 – February 25, 1927) was a Canadian provincial politician. He was the Liberal member of the Legislative Assembly of Quebec for Wolfe from 1904 to 1919.
