= George Washington Stephens Jr. =

Canadian politician

George Washington Stephens
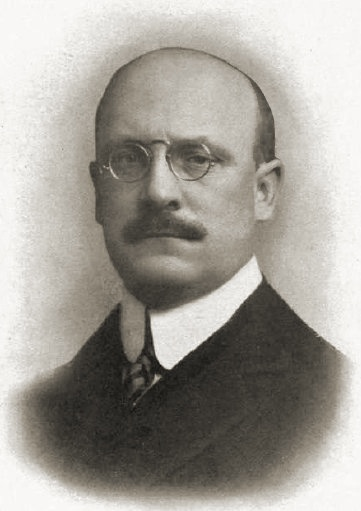

Member of the Legislative Assembly of Quebec for Montréal division no. 4
- In office 1905–1908
- Preceded by: James Cochrane
- Succeeded by: John Thomas Finnie

President of the Commission for the Government of the Saar Basin
- In office 1 April 1926 – 9 June 1927
- Preceded by: Victor Rault
- Succeeded by: Ernest Wilton

Personal details
- Born: August 3, 1866 Montreal, Canada East
- Died: February 6, 1942 (aged 75) Los Angeles, California
- Party: Liberal
- Education: McGill University; University of Geneva; University of Marburg; Leibniz University Hannover
- Occupation: businessman

George Washington Stephens (3 August 1866 – 6 February 1942) was a Canadian politician. He became Lieutenant Colonel and President of the Saar commission of the League of Nations.

Born in Montreal, the son of George Washington Stephens and Elizabeth McIntosh, Stephens was educated at Montreal High School, McGill University, the University of Geneva, University of Marburg, and the Leibniz University Hannover.

He worked with the firm of Steidtman & Company; J. and H. Taylor; and Thomas Robertson & Company, Limited. He was an administrator of his father's estate starting in 1902. He was president of the Canadian Rubber Company of Montreal and vice-president of the Canadian Consolidated Rubber Company Limited.

He was elected as the Liberal candidate by acclamation to the Legislative Assembly of Quebec for the electoral district of Montréal division no. 4 in a 1905 by-election. He did not run in the 1908 election. From 1907 to 1912, he was president of the Montreal Harbor Commission.

In 1898, he joined the Montreal Third Field Battery. He was promoted to major in 1902 and retired with the rank of Lieutenant-Colonel.

In 1923, he was appointed to the League of Nations. He was appointed a member of the Governing Commission of the Saar in 1923 and was its president from 1924 to 1926.

He died in Los Angeles, California in 1942 and was buried in Montreal.
