= Marie Bouillé =

Canadian politician

MNA for Iberville
- In office 2008–2014
- Preceded by: André Riedl
- Succeeded by: Claire Samson

Personal details
- Party: Parti Québécois
- Education: Université Laval; Université de Montréal; Université du Québec à Trois-Rivières

Marie Bouillé is a Canadian politician. Bouillé was elected to represent the riding of Iberville in the National Assembly of Quebec in the 2008 provincial election. She is a member of the Parti Québécois.

Bouille is a graduate from the Université Laval and the Université de Montréal. She obtained a bachelor's degree in geography from Montreal University in 1979 and later obtained a master's degree in hydrology at Laval in 1983. She also studied at the Université du Québec à Trois-Rivières in project management in 1984.

Between 1994 and 1996, she was a juridical councilor for the cabinet of the Minister of Agriculture, Fisheries and Food and also worked for the government's Family Secretary in 1993. Between 1997 and 2006 she was the general manager for the Potato Producer Foundation (part of the Union des producteurs agricoles) and was also the director for women agriculture workers of the UPA in the late 1980s.

Prior to her political career, she was a member of several PQ sub-committees and commissions between 2000 and 2005. Prior to her election in 2008, she was also the candidate in Iberville in the 2007 elections but lost to the ADQ's André Riedl whom Bouillé then defeated in 2008, while Riedl was a member of the Quebec Liberal Party following a cross-over just before the election.
