= Élie Saint-Hilaire =

Canadian politician

Élie Saint-Hilaire (January 29, 1839 – May 12, 1888) was an educator, farmer and political figure in Quebec. He represented Chicoutimi-Saguenay in the Legislative Assembly of Quebec from 1881 to 1888 as an independent conservative member.

He was born in Quebec City, the son of Élie Saint-Hilaire and Geneviève Doville, and was educated at the Séminaire de Québec. Saint-Hilaire studied law for two years and then taught school at Beauport. He then settled on a farm at Saint-Prime. Saint-Hilaire was secretary for the agricultural society for Chicoutimi County and for the county council. He also served as mayor of Saint-Prime. He died in office at Quebec City at the age of 49.
