= Damase Parizeau =

Canadian politician

Member of the Legislative Assembly of Quebec for Montréal division no. 3
- In office 1892–1897
- Preceded by: Henri-Benjamin Rainville
- Succeeded by: Henri-Benjamin Rainville

Personal details
- Born: 1841 Boucherville, Canada East
- Died: October 23, 1915 (aged 73–74) Montreal, Quebec
- Resting place: Notre Dame des Neiges Cemetery
- Party: Conservative
- Relations: Jacques Parizeau, great-grandson

Damase Parizeau (1841 – October 23, 1915) was a farmer, carpenter, lumber merchant and political figure in Quebec. He represented Montréal division no. 3 in the Legislative Assembly of Quebec from 1892 to 1897 as a Conservative. His name also appears as Damase Dalpé dit Parizeau.

He was born in Boucherville, Canada East, the son of Antoine Dalpé dit Parizeau and Aglaée Myette, and was educated there. In 1864, Parizeau married Marie-Geneviève Chartrand. He was president of the Workmen's Benefit Association. Parizeau helped found the Chambre de commerce in Montreal for French-speaking businessmen in the city in 1886 and served as its president. He also served as president of the agricultural society for Chambly County. He was defeated by Henri-Benjamin Rainville when he ran for reelection in 1897. He died in Montreal at the age of 74 and was buried in the Notre Dame des Neiges Cemetery.

== Family ==
Parizeau was the great-grandfather of Jacques Parizeau.
