= Jérôme-Adolphe Chicoyne =

Canadian politician

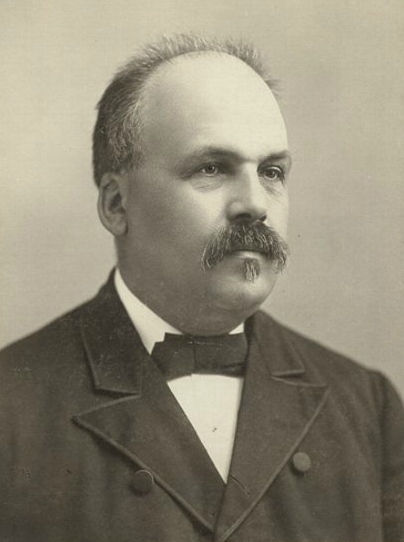

Member of the Legislative Assembly of Quebec for Wolfe
- In office 1892–1904
- Preceded by: Jacques Picard
- Succeeded by: Napoléon-Pierre Tanguay

Personal details
- Born: August 22, 1844 Saint-Pie, Canada East
- Died: September 30, 1910 (aged 66) Saint-Hyacinthe, Quebec
- Party: Conservative

Jérôme-Adolphe Chicoyne (August 22, 1844 – September 30, 1910) was a lawyer, journalist and political figure in Quebec. He represented Wolfe in the Legislative Assembly of Quebec from 1892 to 1904 as a Conservative.

He was born in Saint-Pie, Canada East, the son of Jérôme Chicoine and Dorothée Deslandes, dit Champigny, and was adopted by his godfather Joseph Charbonneau at the age of three. Chicoyne was educated at the Séminaire de Saint-Hyacinthe. He was admitted to the Quebec bar in 1868 and set up practice in Saint-Hyacinthe. Earlier the same year, he had married Marie-Rose-Caroline Perrault. In 1872, he left the practice of law to become an immigration agent for Quebec. Chicoyne contributed to the Courrier de Saint-Hyacinthe and L'Opinion publique. He established the newspaper La Colonisation in Sherbrooke in 1886 and then was the owner and editor of the Pionnier de Sherbrooke from 1888 to 1901. He served on the municipal council for Sherbrooke and was mayor from 1890 to 1892. Chicoyne was also mayor of La Patrie and Mégantic. In the Quebec assembly, he developed the Quebec Agricultural Syndicates’ Act which allowed farmers to set up cooperative associations, leading to the development of caisses populaires. Chicoyne died in Saint-Hyacinthe at the age of 66.

He published Causeries agricoles: une visite chez le capitaine B in 1874 under the pen name Jean Bellevue.
