= Philippe-Honoré Roy =

Canadian politician

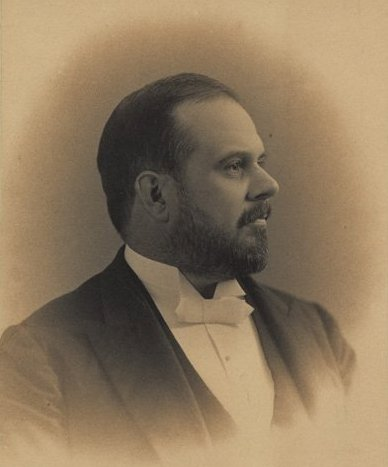

Member of the Legislative Assembly of Quebec for Saint-Jean
- In office 1900–1908
- Preceded by: Félix-Gabriel Marchand
- Succeeded by: Gabriel Marchand

Personal details
- Born: July 30, 1847 Henryville, Canada East
- Died: December 17, 1910 (aged 63) Montreal, Quebec
- Party: Liberal

Philippe-Honoré Roy, QC (French pronunciation: [filip ɔnɔʁe ʁwa]; July 30, 1847 – December 17, 1910) was a lawyer and political figure in Quebec. He represented Saint-Jean in the Legislative Assembly of Quebec from 1900 to 1908 as a Liberal.

He was born in Henryville, Canada East, the son of Édouard Roy and Esther Lamoureux, and was educated at the Collège Sainte-Marie-de-Monnoir, Victoria University and the Montreal Military College. He articled in law with Louis-Amable Jetté, was admitted to the Quebec bar in 1871 and set up practice in Montreal. Roy practised in partnership with Flavien-Guillaume Bouthillier and Amédée-Emmanuel Forget. He was president of the Banque de Saint-Jean, president and promoter for the East Richelieu Valley Railway and owned the viaduct for the town of Saint-Jean. In 1878, he married Auglore, the daughter of Louis Molleur. He was an unsuccessful candidate for a seat in the Quebec assembly in 1890 and for a seat in the House of Commons in 1896. Roy was named Queen's Counsel in 1899. He was named speaker for the Quebec assembly in 1907. In 1908, he ran unsuccessfully for the post of mayor in Montreal. He died in Montreal at the age of 63.

His daughter Georgette married Armand Lavergne.
