= William Clendinneng =

Canadian politician

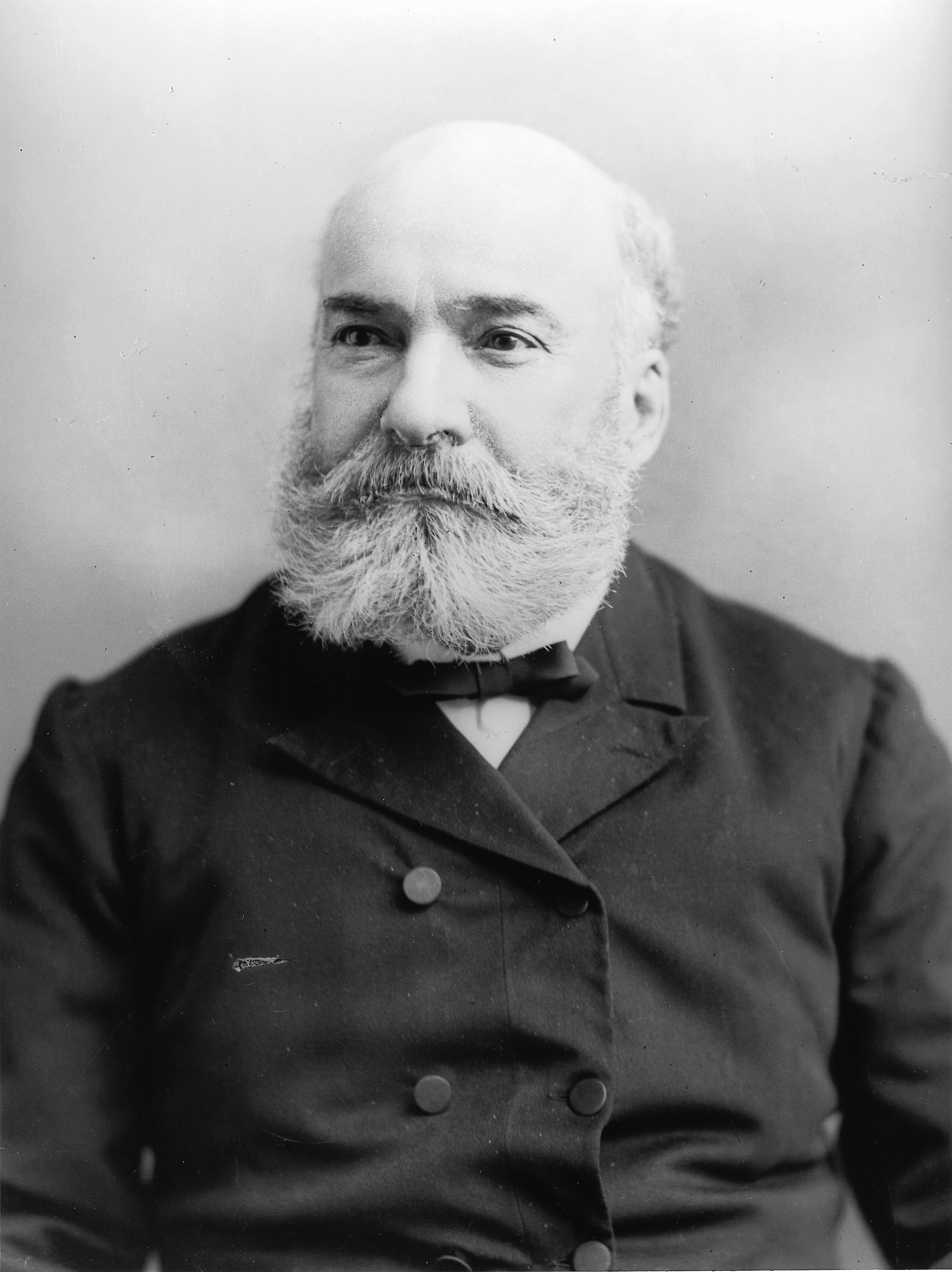

Member of the Legislative Assembly of Quebec for Montréal division no. 4
- In office 1890–1892
- Preceded by: District was created in 1890
- Succeeded by: Alexander Webb Morris

Personal details
- Born: June 22, 1833 Cavan, United Kingdom of Great Britain and Ireland
- Died: June 21, 1907 (aged 73) Depew, New York
- Party: Conservative
- Occupation: manufacturer, merchant

William Clendinneng (June 22, 1833 – June 21, 1907) was an Irish-born manufacturer and political figure in Quebec. He was the owner of the William Clendinneng & Son Company (Limited), one of Canada's most important foundries, in operation from 1868 to 1904. He represented Montréal division no. 4 in the Legislative Assembly of Quebec from 1890 to 1892 as a Conservative.

Born in Cavan, William Clendinneng arrived in Montreal with his family in 1847, at the young age of 14. Clendinneng joined the William Rodden & Company foundry (est.1810) located at Griffintown, near the Lachine canal, Montréal. Starting at the age of 19, he served as a clerk at the foundry from 1852 to 1858, becoming a partner in 1858, and owner in 1868. At this time the foundry's name was changed to W. Clendinneng foundry. In 1853, he married Rachel Newmarch.

The foundry was a significant player in the early industrial growth of Montréal. Clendinneng's son, William Jr., joined the business in 1884 as a partner, and the name was changed to The William Clendinneng & Son Company (Limited). By 1886, the foundry's 450 workers made castings of all types, including: architectural and ornamental ironwork; agricultural and railway castings; drain and gas pipes; stoves, ranges, furnaces, and hollow ware; and household goods—the tools of the homestead farms and Canada's urbanization. The foundry participated in the Great Crystal Palace Exhibition of 1851 in Britain and Paris' 1855 Exposition. Canada's first industrial design was a Clendinneng double stove, registered in 1861. The foundry also made the stately main gates and fence for Rideau Hall. Under Clendinneng the business developed into the largest foundry in Canada. Clendinneng was also owner of the Canada Pipe & Foundry Company.

Clendinneng was a dedicated Methodist and a founding member and president of the Irish Protestant Benevolent Society of Montréal (est. 1856). He was a board member of many different societies, including the Montréal Protestant House of Industry and Refuge, the Montréal General Hospital, the Society for the Prevention of Cruelty to Animals. and the Young Men's Christian Association in Montreal.

Clendinneng played a prominent role in the civic life of Montréal. As an alderman for the Sainte-Antoine riding he served on the Montreal city council from 1876 to 1879 and again from 1888 to 1893. He introduced many improvements to the Montréal's civic regulations and bylaws, and served as Acting Mayor in 1888. He was a Conservative representative at the Legislative Assembly of Quebec from 1890 to 1892.

After the Clendinneng foundry ceased operations in 1904, Clendinneng left Montreal. He died in Depew, New York at the age of 73 after being hit by a train. He is buried at the Mount Royal Cemetery, Montréal.

The legacy of William Clendinneng Sr. and his son, William Jr., will forever be associated with iron manufacturing.
