= Rémi-Ferdinand Rinfret =

Canadian politician

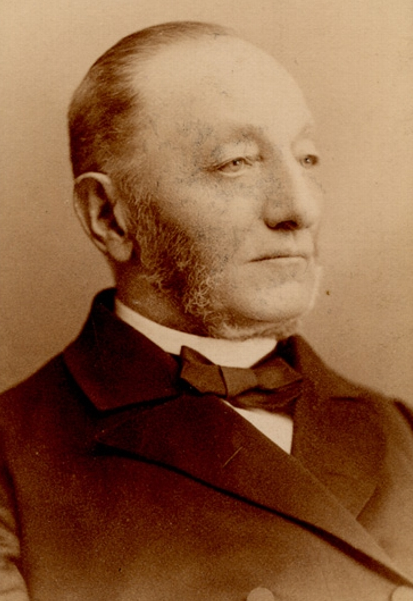
- Rinfret, c.1890

Member of the Legislative Assembly of Quebec for Québec-Centre
- In office 1874–1892
- Preceded by: Hector-Louis Langevin
- Succeeded by: Victor Châteauvert

Personal details
- Born: June 15, 1819 Notre-Dame de Québec, Lower Canada
- Died: October 8, 1901 (aged 82) Quebec City, Quebec
- Party: Conservative (1874-1875); Liberal (1875-1892)
- Relations: Némèse Garneau, nephew

Rémi-Ferdinand Rinfret (June 5, 1819 – October 8, 1901) was a physician and political figure in Quebec. He represented Québec-Centre in the Legislative Assembly of Quebec from 1874 to 1892 as a Conservative, then Liberal member. His surname also appears as Rinfret dit Malouin.

He was born in Notre-Dame de Québec, Lower Canada, the son of Rémi Rinfret dit Malouin and Olivette Chaillé. He studied at the Séminaire de Québec, continuing his studies in medicine at Quebec City and then at Harvard University. He was qualified to practice in 1845 and set up practice at Quebec City. In 1846, he married Delphine Catherine Chamberland. Rinfret was vice-president of the Association des médecins et chirurgiens de la province de Québec for Quebec district. He also served as a justice of the peace. Rinfret was a member of the municipal council for Quebec City from 1863 to 1890 and was president of the Board of Health from 1871 to 1890. He was first elected to the Quebec assembly as a Conservative in an 1874 by-election held after Hector-Louis Langevin resigned his seat and was reelected as a Liberal in 1875, 1878, 1881, 1886 and 1890. He was defeated when he ran for reelection in 1892. He died at Quebec City at the age of 82.

His daughter Olivia married Arthur Joseph Turcotte.
