= Alexander Webb Morris =

Canadian politician

Member of the Legislative Assembly of Quebec for Montréal division no. 4
- In office 1892–1896
- Preceded by: William Clendinneng
- Succeeded by: Albert William Atwater

Personal details
- Born: 1856 Brockville, Canada West
- Died: March 30, 1935 (aged 78–79) Lachine, Quebec
- Resting place: Mount Royal Cemetery
- Party: Conservative

Alexander Webb Morris (1856–March 30, 1935) was a businessman and political figure in Quebec. He represented Montréal division no. 4 in the Legislative Assembly of Quebec from 1892 to 1896 as a Conservative.

He was born in Brockville, Canada West, the son of William Lang Morris and Julia Frances Converse, and was educated at the High School of Montreal and Bishop's College in Lennoxville. Morris established himself in business in Montreal. He was associated with the Bank of Montreal and was owner of the Converse Cordage Company and A. W. Morris & Brothers. He also served as a director for the Molson Bank. In 1879, he married Florence N. Rennie. From 1885 to 1887, he was mayor of Saint-Gabriel. Morris also served on the city council for Montreal from 1887 to 1888. He was a minister without portfolio in the Quebec cabinet from 1895 to 1896, when he resigned from the assembly. Morris died in Lachine at the age of 79 and was buried in the Mount Royal Cemetery.
