= Iberville, Quebec =

Iberville
- Former city
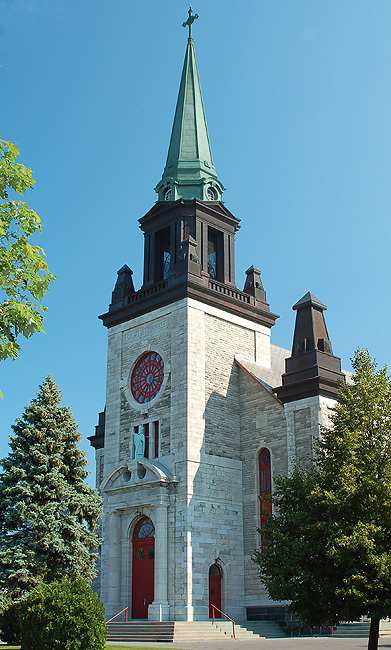

- Location within Quebec
- Coordinates: 45°19′N 73°14′W
- Country: Canada
- Province: Quebec
- Region: Montérégie
- Regional county: Iberville
- Civilly erected: 1 January 1967

Government
  - Mayor: Gilles Dolbec
  - Federal riding: Montérégie
  - Prov. riding: Iberville

Area
  - Total: 5.21 km^{2} (2.01 sq mi)
  - Land: 5.21 km^{2} (2.01 sq mi)

Population (2006)
  - Total: 9,989
  - Density: 1,915.8/km^{2} (4,962/sq mi)
- Time zone: UTC-5 (EST)
  - Summer (DST): UTC-4 (EDT)
- Postal code: J2X
- Area codes: 418 and 581

Iberville (French pronunciation: [ibɛʁvil]) was a city in the Montérégie region of the Canadian province of Quebec on the east side of the Richelieu River, across from Saint-Jean-sur-Richelieu. It was about 30 miles (50 km) from Montreal, and about the same distance from the United States border at the head of Lake Champlain. In 2002, Iberville merged with neighbouring Saint-Jean-sur-Richelieu, along with several other neighbouring towns and villages.

The population of Iberville in 2006 was 9,989, up 6% from the 2001 census.

The last mayor of Iberville was Jean Rioux, who later became a Liberal MNA in the National Assembly of Quebec and a Liberal MP in the House of Commons of Canada.

== Education ==
The South Shore Protestant Regional School Board previously served the municipality.
