= Émile Bonvouloir =

Canadian politician

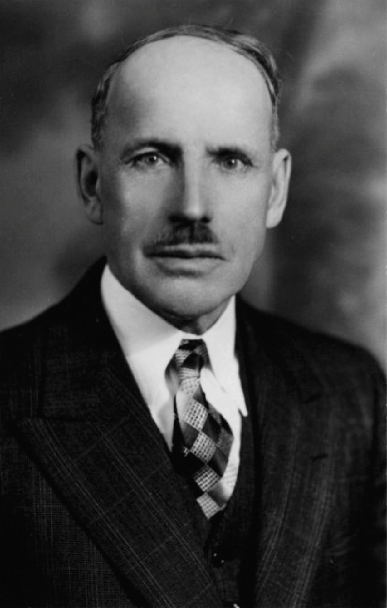

Member of the Legislative Assembly of Quebec for Iberville
- In office 1939–1944
- Preceded by: Lucien Lamoureux
- Succeeded by: Yvon Thuot

Personal details
- Born: April 21, 1875 Sainte-Brigide-d'Iberville, Quebec
- Died: August 11, 1969 (aged 94) Sainte-Brigide-d'Iberville, Quebec
- Party: Liberal

Émile Bonvouloir (April 21, 1875 – August 11, 1969) was a Canadian provincial politician.

Born in Sainte-Brigide-d'Iberville, Quebec, Bonvouloir was the member of the Legislative Assembly of Quebec for Iberville from 1939 to 1944.
