= Achille-Ferdinand Carrier =

Canadian politician

Member of the Legislative Assembly of Quebec for Gaspé
- In office 1890–1892
- Preceded by: Edmund James Flynn
- Succeeded by: Edmund James Flynn

Personal details
- Born: February 15, 1859 Saint-Roch, Quebec City, Canada East
- Died: March 21, 1930 (aged 71) Quebec City, Quebec
- Party: Liberal
- Relations: Oscar Lefebvre Boulanger, nephew

Achille-Ferdinand Carrier (February 15, 1859 – March 21, 1930) was a lawyer, judge, and political figure in Quebec. He represented Gaspé in the Legislative Assembly of Quebec from 1890 to 1892 as a Liberal.

He was born in Saint-Roch, Canada East, the son of Ferdinand Carrier and Mary Ann Donahue, and was educated at the Séminaire de Québec and the Université Laval. Carrier was called to the Quebec bar in 1882. He was also a member of the Minnesota bar and practised in Minneapolis in 1885 and 1886. Carrier was the editor of the L'Écho de l'Ouest, a French-Canadian newspaper in Minneapolis. He ran unsuccessfully for a seat in the Canadian House of Commons in 1887. Carrier was defeated when he ran for reelection in 1892; he also ran unsuccessfully for the Terrebonne seat in 1897. He served as judge in the Magistrate's Court for Terrebonne, Joliette and Ottawa districts from 1898 to 1924. Carrier died in Quebec City at the age of 71.

He was the uncle of Oscar Lefebvre Boulanger.
