= Ferdinand David (politician) =

Canadian politician

Member of the Legislative Assembly of Quebec for Montréal-Est
- In office 1871–1875
- Preceded by: George-Étienne Cartier
- Succeeded by: Louis-Olivier Taillon

Personal details
- Born: May 30, 1824 Sault-au-Récollet (Montréal-Nord), Lower Canada
- Died: July 16, 1883 (aged 59) Montreal, Quebec
- Party: Liberal

Ferdinand David (May 30, 1824 – July 16, 1883) was a building contractor and political figure in Quebec. He represented Montréal-Est in the Legislative Assembly of Quebec from 1871 to 1875 as a Conservative member.

He was born Ferdinand-Conon David in Sault-au-Récollet, Lower Canada, the son of David-Fleury David and Cécile Poitras. He was educated locally, also learning the trade of carpentry, and later worked as a painter and coach-builder in Montreal. David then worked as a building contractor before joining a firm with Sévère Rivard, lawyer Gustave-Adolphe Drolet and architect Michel Laurent which specialized in real estate and house construction. He served on Montreal city council from 1861 to 1877; David served as chairman of the roads committee and ran unsuccessfully for the post of mayor. He was married twice: to Olive Boyer, dit Quintal in 1844 and to Sophie Homier, the widow of Joseph Papin, in 1868. David was involved in the temperance movement of the time. He also was vice-president of the Saint-Jean-Baptiste Society at Montreal, president of the Société de l’Union Saint-Joseph de Montréal and the Société de Colonisation de Montréal, and a director of the Montreal Northern Colonization Railway. He died in Montreal at the age of 59 and was buried in the Notre Dame des Neiges Cemetery.
