= Jacques-Raymond Tremblay =

Canadian politician

Member of Parliament for Richelieu—Verchères
- In office May 1967 – April 1968

Member of Quebec Assembly for Iberville
- In office 1973–1976

Personal details
- Born: 31 August 1923 Sorel, Quebec
- Died: 2 August 2012 (aged 88) Sorel-Tracy, Quebec
- Party: Liberal
- Profession: life underwriter

Jacques-Raymond Tremblay (31 August 1923 – 2 August 2012) was a Canadian politician.

Tremblay was born in Sorel, Quebec. He was a life underwriter by career.

He was elected in Richelieu—Verchères riding for the Liberal Party of Canada in a 29 May 1967 by-election. After serving the remaining term of the 27th Canadian Parliament, Tremblay left federal political office and did not campaign in the 1968 federal election. He became an assistant to the Minister of National Revenue from 1968 to 1969.

Tremblay turned to provincial politics, winning a seat in the Iberville riding and served one term as a Liberal member of the National Assembly of Quebec. He was elected in the 1973 election and defeated in 1976.

Tremblay died at Sorel-Tracy on 2 August 2012.
