= Louis-Olivier Taillon =

Premier of Quebec in 1887 and from 1892 to 1896

The Honourable Sir Louis-Olivier Taillon PC
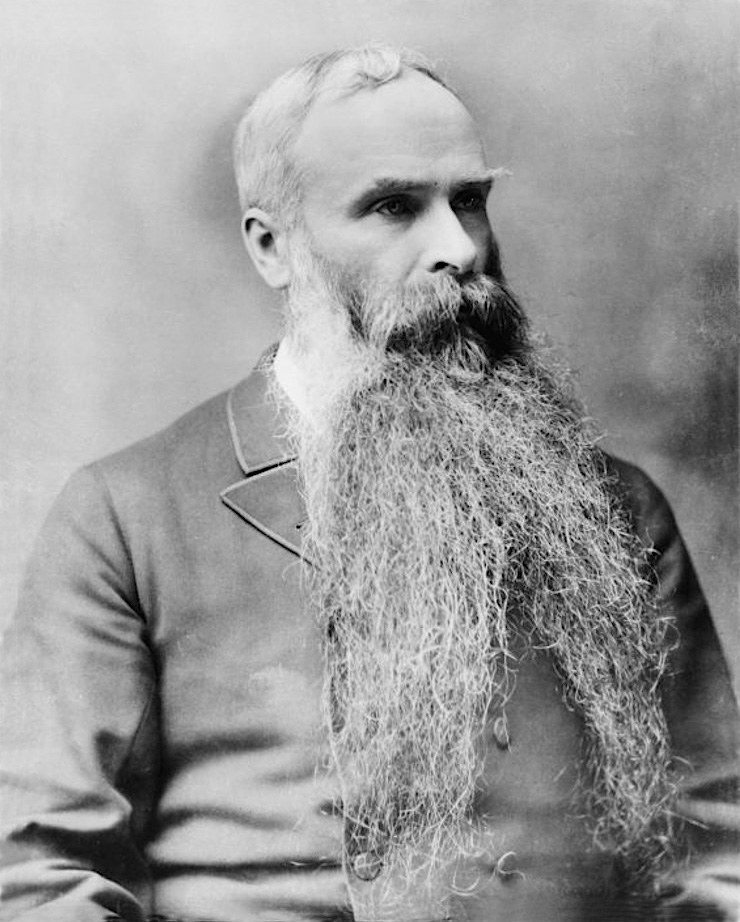

8th Premier of Quebec
- In office 25 January 1887 – 27 January 1887
- Monarch: Victoria
- Lieutenant Governor: Louis-Rodrigue Masson
- Preceded by: John Jones Ross
- Succeeded by: Honoré Mercier
- In office 16 December 1892 – 11 May 1896
- Monarch: Victoria
- Preceded by: Charles Boucher de Boucherville
- Succeeded by: Edmund James Flynn

Member of the Legislative Assembly of Quebec for Montréal-Est
- In office July 7, 1875 – October 14, 1886
- Lieutenant Governor: Joseph-Adolphe Chapleau
- Preceded by: Ferdinand-Conon David
- Succeeded by: Laurent-Olivier David

Member of the Legislative Assembly of Quebec for Montcalm
- In office October 14, 1886 – June 17, 1890
- Preceded by: Jean-Baptiste-Trefflé Richard
- Succeeded by: Joseph-Alcide Martin

Member of the Legislative Assembly of Quebec for Chambly
- In office Mar 8, 1892 – May 11, 1897
- Preceded by: Antoine Rocheleau
- Succeeded by: Antoine Rocheleau

Personal details
- Born: September 26, 1840 Saint-Louis-de-Terrebonne (Terrebonne), Lower Canada
- Died: April 25, 1923 (aged 82) Montreal, Quebec, Canada
- Resting place: Notre Dame des Neiges Cemetery
- Party: Conservative
- Spouse: Georgiana Archambault (m. 1875)
- Children: 1
- Education: Collège Masson
- Profession: Lawyer

Sir Louis-Olivier Taillon PC (French pronunciation: [lwi ɔlivje tajɔ̃]; September 26, 1840 – April 25, 1923) was a Canadian lawyer and politician. He was the eighth premier of Quebec, serving two separate terms.

== Political career ==
Taillon's first term of office was just four days, from January 25 to January 29, 1887. This term came at the end of the Conservative government of his predecessor John Jones Ross. Ross had lost the 1886 Quebec election, but had tried to cling to power in a minority government for a few more months.

Taillon was Leader of the Opposition from 1887 until 1890, when he lost the 1890 election and his own seat.

He briefly returned to the practice of law, but following the removal of Liberal Honoré Mercier from office by the Lieutenant-Governor of Quebec, Taillon became minister without portfolio in the government of Charles-Eugène Boucher de Boucherville. Taillon became premier when Boucher de Boucherville resigned. Taillon lost the 1890 election but continued as leader of the party.

He resigned in 1896 and moved into federal politics to serve as Postmaster-General in the very short-lived federal Conservative government of Charles Tupper, from May to July 1896. He failed to gain a federal seat in the 1896 federal election, and likewise failed to secure a seat in the 1900 federal election, ending his political career. In 1916, he was made a Knight Bachelor.

== Personal life ==
Taillon was born in Terrebonne, Lower Canada (now Quebec). He was the son of Aimé Taillon, a farmer, and Josephte Daunais. Taillon married Georgiana Archambault in 1875. Archambault and their child died shortly after the child's birth in January 1876.

By the 1920s, Taillon had lost his sight and by 1922 had cut off his beard, his political trademark. Taillon lived in the Institution des Sourdes-Muettes on Rue Saint-Denis in Montreal. Taillon died in 1923.

== See also ==
- Politics of Quebec
- List of Quebec general elections
- Timeline of Quebec history

Preceded by Arthur Turcotte	Speaker of the Legislative Assembly of Quebec; 1882–1884	Succeeded by Jonathan Saxton Campbell Würtele
