= Wolfe (provincial electoral district) =

Quebec electoral district

Defunct provincial electoral district
- Legislature: National Assembly of Quebec
- District created: 1890
- District abolished: 1972
- First contested: 1890
- Last contested: 1970

Wolfe was a former provincial electoral district in the Estrie region of Quebec, Canada.

It was created for the 1890 election from part of Richmond-Wolfe electoral district. Its final election was in 1970. It disappeared in the 1973 election and its successor electoral districts were Frontenac, Mégantic-Compton and Richmond.

Wolfe was named in honour of General James Wolfe, who led the English side in the Battle of the Plains of Abraham.

== Members of the Legislative Assembly / National Assembly ==
- Jacques Picard, Conservative Party (1890–1892)
- Jérôme-Adolphe Chicoyne, Conservative Party (1892–1904)
- Napoléon-Pierre Tanguay, Liberal (1904–1919)
- Joseph-Eugène Rhéault, Liberal (1919–1921)
- Joseph-Pierre-Cyrénus Lemieux, Liberal (1921–1933)
- Thomas-Hercule Lapointe, Liberal (1933–1936)
- Henri Vachon, Union Nationale (1936–1939)
- Thomas-Hercule Lapointe, Liberal (1939–1944)
- Henri Vachon, Union Nationale (1944–1952)
- Gérard Lemieux, Liberal (1952–1956)
- Henri Vachon, Union Nationale (1956–1960)
- Gerard Lemieux, Liberal (1960–1962)
- René Lavoie, Union Nationale (1962–1973)
