= Québec-Centre (provincial electoral district) =

Quebec electoral district

Defunct provincial electoral district
- Legislature: National Assembly of Quebec
- District created: 1867
- District abolished: 1965
- First contested: 1867
- Last contested: 1962

Québec-Centre was a former provincial electoral district in the Capitale-Nationale region of Quebec, Canada. It was located in the general area of Quebec City. It elected members to the Legislative Assembly of Quebec.

It was created for the 1867 election. Its final election was in 1962. It disappeared in the 1966 election and its successor electoral district was Jean-Talon.

== Members of the Legislative Assembly ==
- Georges-Honoré Simard, Conservative Party (1867–1871)
- Hector-Louis Langevin, Conservative Party (1871–1874)
- Rémi-Ferdinand Rinfret, Conservative Party – Liberal (1874–1892)
- Victor Châteauvert, Conservative Party (1892–1897)
- Amédée Robitaille, Liberal (1897–1908)
- Eugène Leclerc, Liberal (1908–1916)
- Lawrence Arthur Dumoulin Cannon, Liberal (1916–1923)
- Pierre-Vincent Faucher, Conservative Party (1923–1927)
- Joseph Samson, Liberal (1927–1935)
- Philippe Hamel, Action liberale nationale – Union Nationale (1935–1939)
- Joseph-William Morin, Liberal (1939–1948)
- Gérard Guay, Union Nationale (1948–1952)
- Maurice Cloutier, Union Nationale (1952–1962)
- Henri Beaupré, Liberal (1962–1966)
