= François Gosselin =

Canadian politician

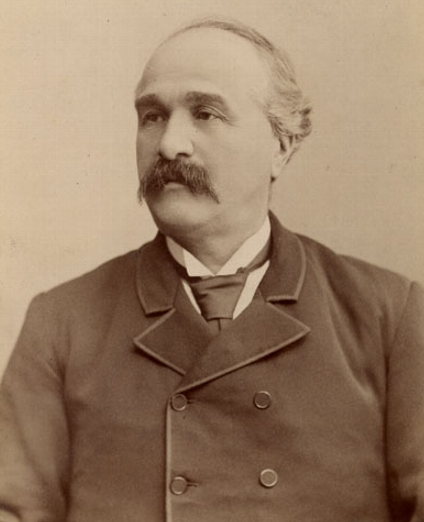

Member of the Legislative Assembly of Quebec for Iberville
- In office 1890–1906
- Preceded by: Georges Duhamel
- Succeeded by: Joseph-Aldéric Benoit

Member of the Legislative Council of Quebec for Rougemont
- In office 1906–1909
- Preceded by: Gédéon Ouimet
- Succeeded by: Ernest Choquette

Personal details
- Born: November 13, 1837 Saint-Athanase, Lower Canada
- Died: April 9, 1909 (aged 71) Saint-Alexandre, Quebec
- Party: Liberal
- Relations: Joseph-Jean-Baptiste Gosselin, brother

François Gosselin (November 13, 1837 – April 9, 1909) was a merchant, farmer and political figure in Quebec. He represented Iberville in the Legislative Assembly of Quebec from 1890 to 1906 as a Liberal.

He was born in Saint-Athanase, Lower Canada, the son of François Gosselin and Onésime Nadeau. He lived in Saint-Alexandre. Gosselin was president of the Banque de Saint-Jean. In 1861, he married Mélanie Manie. He was mayor of Saint-Alexandre from 1862 to 1865 and also served as school trustee.

In 1906, he was named to the Legislative Council of Quebec for Rougemont division. Gosselin died in office in Saint-Alexandre at the age of 71.

His brother Joseph-Jean-Baptiste also served in the Quebec assembly.
