= Montréal division no. 4 =

Quebec electoral district

Defunct provincial electoral district
- Legislature: National Assembly of Quebec
- District created: 1890
- District abolished: 1912
- First contested: 1890
- Last contested: 1908

Montréal division no. 4 (or Montréal no. 4) was a former provincial electoral district in the Montreal region of Quebec, Canada that elected members to the Legislative Assembly of Quebec.

It was created for the 1890 election from part of Montréal-Ouest electoral district. Its final election was in 1908. It disappeared in the 1912 election and its successor electoral district was Montréal–Saint-Laurent.

== Members of the Legislative Assembly ==
- William Clendinneng, Conservative (1890–1892)
- Alexander Webb Morris, Conservative (1892–1896)
- Albert William Atwater, Conservative (1896–1900)
- James Cochrane, Liberal (1900–1905)
- George Washington Stephens Jr., Liberal (1905–1908)
- John Thomas Finnie, Liberal (1908–1912)
