= 1892 Quebec general election =

Canadian provincial election

- March 8, 1892

73 seats in the 8th Legislative Assembly of Quebec 37 seats were needed for a majority
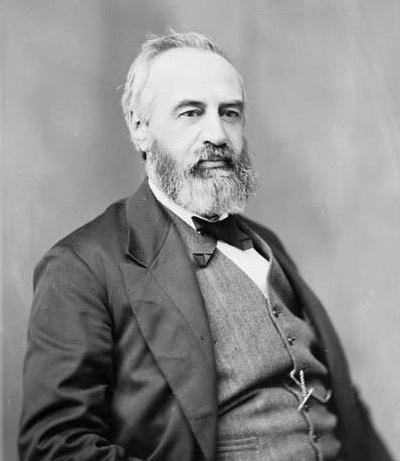

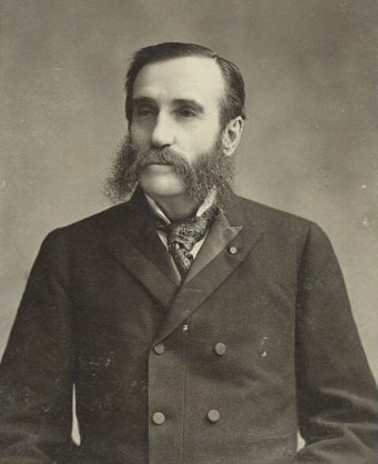
	First party	Second party
Leader	Charles Boucher de Boucherville	Félix-Gabriel Marchand
Party	Conservative	Liberal
Leader since	1891	1892
Leader's seat	Councillor for Montarville	Saint-Jean
Last election	23 seats, 45.39%	43 seats, 44.51%
Seats won	51	21
Seat change	▲28	▼22
Popular vote	91,579	76,280
Percentage	52.41%	43.65%
Swing	▲7.02pp	▼0.86pp
Premier before election
Charles Boucher de Boucherville
Conservative
Premier after election
Charles Boucher de Boucherville
Conservative

In the 1892 Quebec general election on March 8, 1892, to elect members of the Legislative Assembly of the Province of Quebec, Canada. The incumbent Quebec Conservative Party, led by Charles-Eugène Boucher de Boucherville, defeated the Quebec Liberal Party, led by Félix-Gabriel Marchand.

Mercier had been accused of corruption and removed from office as Premier by Quebec Lieutenant-governor Auguste-Réal Angers on December 16, 1891. The scandal probably influenced the outcome of the election. Mercier gave up the post of Liberal leader (and leader of the Opposition) to Félix-Gabriel Marchand, and was later acquitted of all charges.

Boucher de Boucherville resigned a year later, and was replaced by Louis-Olivier Taillon as Conservative leader and premier. Taillon in turn resigned in 1896, and was replaced by Edmund James Flynn. Flynn lost the 1897 election, and the Conservatives never held power in Quebec again.

The turnout was 59.97%.

== Results ==
Party	Party leader	# of candidates	Seats			Popular Vote		
Party	Party leader	# of candidates	1890	Elected	% Change	#	%	% Change
Conservative	Charles-Eugène Boucher de Boucherville		23	51	+122%	91,579	52.41%	+7.02%
Liberal	Félix-Gabriel Marchand		43	21	-51.2%	76,280	43.65%	-0.86%
Independent Conservative			1	1	-	6,892	3.94%	-6.7%
Other			6	-	-100%	6,892	3.94%	-6.7%
Total			73	73	-	174,751	100%	

Popular vote
PCQ	52.41%
PLQ	43.65%
Others	3.94%

Seats summary
PCQ	69.86%
PLQ	28.77%
Others	1.37%

== See also ==
- List of Quebec premiers
- Politics of Quebec
- Timeline of Quebec history
- List of Quebec political parties
- 8th Legislative Assembly of Quebec
