= Félix-Gabriel Marchand =

Premier of Quebec from 1897 to 1900

The Honourable Félix-Gabriel Marchand
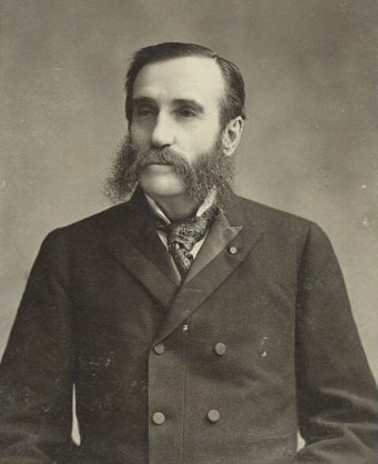
- Marchard, c. 1900

11th Premier of Quebec
- In office May 24, 1897 – September 25, 1900
- Monarch: Victoria
- Lieutenant Governor: Joseph-Adolphe Chapleau; Louis-Amable Jetté
- Preceded by: Edmund James Flynn
- Succeeded by: Simon-Napoléon Parent

MNA for Saint-Jean
- In office September 1, 1867 – September 25, 1900
- Preceded by: first member
- Succeeded by: Philippe-Honoré Roy

Personal details
- Born: January 9, 1832 Dorchester (Saint-Jean-sur-Richelieu), Lower Canada
- Died: September 25, 1900 (aged 68) Quebec City, Quebec
- Party: Liberal
- Spouse: Hersélie Turgeon (m. 1854)
- Children: 11
- Education: Collège Antoine-Girouard
- Occupation: journalist, author, notary
- Profession: politician

Félix-Gabriel Marchand (French pronunciation: [feliks ɡabʁijɛl maʁʃɑ̃]; January 9, 1832 – September 25, 1900) was a journalist, author, notary and politician in Quebec, Canada. He was the 11th premier of Quebec from May 24, 1897, to September 25, 1900.

Born in what is Saint-Jean-sur-Richelieu, Quebec today, he was the son of Lt.-Colonel Gabriel Marchand (1780–1852) J.P., and Mary MacNider, a woman of the Anglican faith, daughter of John MacNider, 2nd Seigneur of Metis, Quebec. As a child, Marchand attended English schools and was taught in French at the age of 11. Fluently bilingual, Marchand became a journalist and writer. He became a notary and practised this profession for 45 years, but continued journalism and writing as well.

He was elected to the Legislative Assembly of Quebec in the 1867 Quebec provincial election for the district of Saint-Jean and retained his seat for 33 years until his death. He was the Leader of the Opposition from 1892 to 1897, and then won the 1897 election as leader of the Liberal Party.

As premier, Marchand attempted to create a Ministry of Education in 1898. At the time, education was entirely in the hands of the clergy of the Roman Catholic Church in the province. His legislation was passed by the Legislative Assembly (the lower chamber of Quebec's legislature), but was defeated in the Legislative Council (the upper house). It was not until 1964 that a Ministry of Education was finally created in Quebec.

Félix-Gabriel Marchand was still in office when he died in 1900 in Quebec City. He is interred in the cimetière Notre-Dame-de-Belmont in Sainte-Foy, Quebec.

Dr. André Simard, husband of Marthe Simard, was his grandson.

== See also ==
- Politics of Quebec
- Quebec general elections
- Timeline of Quebec history

Legislative Assembly of Quebec
Preceded by Jonathan Saxton Campbell Würtele	Speaker of the Legislative Assembly of Quebec; 1887–1892	Succeeded by Pierre-Évariste Leblanc
Professional and academic associations
Preceded by Cornelius O'Brien	President of the Royal Society of Canada; 1897–1898	Succeeded by Thomas Keefer
