= 1897 Quebec general election =

Canadian provincial election

- May 11, 1897

74 seats in the 9th Legislative Assembly of Quebec 38 seats were needed for a majority
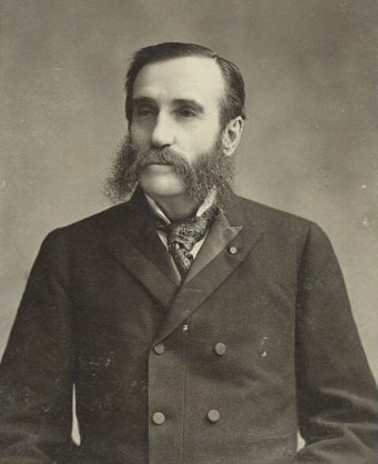

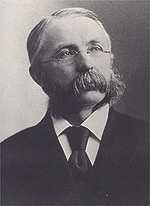
	First party	Second party
Leader	Félix-Gabriel Marchand	Edmund James Flynn
Party	Liberal	Conservative
Leader since	1892	1896
Leader's seat	Saint-Jean	Gaspé
Last election	21 seats, 43.65%	51 seats, 52.41%
Seats won	51	23
Seat change	▲30	▼28
Popular vote	120,300	98,941
Percentage	53.28%	43.82%
Swing	▲9.63pp	▼8.59pp
Premier before election
Edmund James Flynn
Conservative
Premier after election
Félix-Gabriel Marchand
Liberal

The 1897 Quebec general election was held on May 11, 1897, to elect members of the Legislative Assembly of the Province of Quebec, Canada. The Quebec Liberal Party, led by Félix-Gabriel Marchand, defeated the incumbent Quebec Conservative Party, led by Edmund James Flynn.

This marked the start of over 39 consecutive years in power for the Liberals. The Conservative Party never held power again in Quebec, and ceased to exist in 1936 when it merged with the Action libérale nationale to form the Union Nationale, which formed a government later that year.

Marchand died in office in 1900, and was succeeded by Simon-Napoléon Parent as Liberal leader and premier.

== Additional Assembly seat ==
An Act passed in 1895 provided for the Îles-de-la-Madeleine to be separated from Gaspé for the subsequent election, and thus elect their own MLA.

== Results ==
Party	Party leader	# of candidates	Seats			Popular Vote		
Party	Party leader	# of candidates	1892	Elected	% Change	#	%	% Change
Liberal	Félix-Gabriel Marchand		21	51	+143%	120,300	53.28%	+9.63%
Conservative	Edmund James Flynn		51	23	-54.9%	98,941	43.82%	-8.59%
Other			1	-	-100%	6,538	2.90%	-1.0%
Total			73	74	+1.4%	225,779	100%	

Popular vote
PLQ	53.28%
PCQ	43.82%
Others	2.90%

Seats summary
PLQ	68.92%
PCQ	31.08%

== See also ==
- List of Quebec premiers
- Politics of Quebec
- Timeline of Quebec history
- List of Quebec political parties
- 9th Legislative Assembly of Quebec
