= Chicoutimi-Saguenay (provincial electoral district) =

Coordinates: 48.418°N 71.080°W

Quebec electoral district

Defunct provincial electoral district
- Legislature: National Assembly of Quebec
- District created: 1867
- District abolished: 1912
- First contested: 1867
- Last contested: 1908

Chicoutimi-Saguenay (or Chicoutimi et Saguenay) was a former provincial electoral district in the province of Quebec, Canada.

It was created for the 1867 election (and an electoral district of that name existed earlier in the Legislative Assembly of the Province of Canada). Its final election was in 1908. It disappeared in the 1912 election, when it was split into Charlevoix—Saguenay and Chicoutimi.

== Members of the Legislative Assembly ==
- Pierre-Alexis Tremblay, Independent - Liberal (1867–1874)
- Michel Guillaume Baby, Conservative Party (1874–1875)
- William Evan Price, Conservative - Independent Conservative (1875–1880)
- Joseph-Élisée Beaudet, Conservative Party (1880–1881)
- Élie Saint-Hilaire, Independent Conservative (1881–1888)
- Séverin Dumais, Parti national (1888–1890)
- Onésime Côté, Parti national (1890–1892)
- Honoré Petit, Conservative Party - Liberal (1892–1912)
