= 1890 Quebec general election =

Canadian provincial election

- June 17, 1890

73 seats in the 7th Legislative Assembly of Quebec 37 seats were needed for a majority
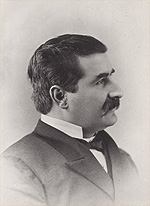

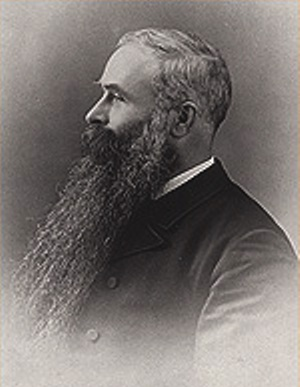
	First party	Second party
Leader	Honoré Mercier	Louis-Olivier Taillon
Party	Liberal	Conservative
Leader since	1883	1887
Leader's seat	Bonaventure	Montcalm (lost re-election)
Last election	33 seats, 39.54%	26 seats, 46.19%
Seats won	43	23
Seat change	▲10	▼3
Popular vote	70,345	71,695
Percentage	44.54%	45.39%
Swing	▲5.0pp	▼0.8pp
Premier before election
Honoré Mercier
Liberal
Premier after election
Honoré Mercier
Liberal

The 1890 Quebec general election was held on June 17, 1890, to elect members of the 7th Legislative Assembly of the Province of Quebec, Canada. The incumbent Quebec Liberal Party Parti national coalition led by Honoré Mercier, was re-elected, defeating the Quebec Conservative Party, led by Louis-Olivier Taillon.

A scandal and charges of corruption cut short Mercier's term of office. He was later cleared of all charges, but his political career was ended.

== Redistribution of ridings ==
Through the passage of two Acts passed prior to the election, the Assembly was increased from 65 to 73 members through the following changes:

Abolished ridings	New ridings
Divisions of ridings
Chicoutimi et Saguenay	Chicoutimi et Saguenay; Lac St-Jean
Drummond et Arthabaska	Arthabaska; Drummond
Québec-Est	Québec-Est; St. Sauveur
Richmond et Wolfe (Note: Protected seat under British North America Act 1867, s. 80. Successor seats had same status.)	Richmond; Wolfe
Rimouski	Matane; Rimouski
Reorganization of ridings
Montréal Centre; Montréal Est; Montreal Ouest	Montréal division no. 1; Montréal division no. 2; Montréal division no. 3; Montréal division no. 4; Montréal division no. 5; Montréal division no. 6

== Results ==
Party	Party Leader	# of candidates	Seats			Popular Vote		
Party	Party Leader	# of candidates	1886	Elected	% Change	#	%	% Change
Liberal	Honoré Mercier		33	43	+30.3%	70,345	44.54%	+5.0%
Conservative	Louis-Olivier Taillon		26	23	-11.5%	71,695	45.39%	-0.8%
Independent Conservative			3	1	-66.7%	15,888	10.06%	-3.6%
Parti national			3	5	+66.7%	15,888	10.06%	-3.6%
Parti ouvrier			-	1		15,888	10.06%	-3.6%
Other			-	-	-	15,888	10.06%	-3.6%
Total			65	73	-	157,928	100%	

Popular vote
PCQ	45.39%
PLQ	44.54%
Others	10.06%

Seats summary
PLQ	58.90%
PCQ	31.51%
Others	9.59%

== See also ==
- List of Quebec premiers
- Politics of Quebec
- Timeline of Quebec history
- List of Quebec political parties
- 7th Legislative Assembly of Quebec
