= Georges Ball =

Canadian politician (1838–1928)

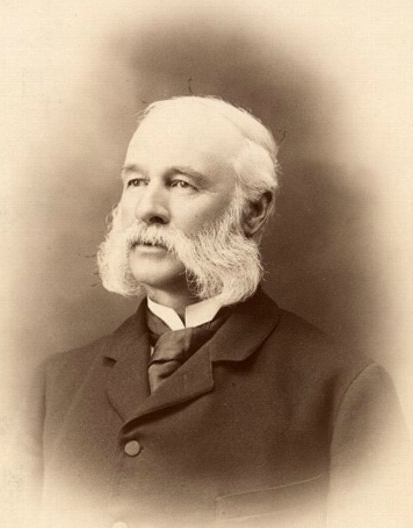

Member of the Canadian Parliament for Nicolet
- In office 1900–1904
- Preceded by: Joseph Hector Leduc
- Succeeded by: Rodolphe Lemieux

Member of the Legislative Assembly of Quebec for Nicolet
- In office 1897–1900
- Preceded by: Louis Beaubien
- Succeeded by: Edmund James Flynn

Personal details
- Born: September 11, 1838 Champlain, Lower Canada
- Died: May 30, 1928 (aged 89) Quebec City, Quebec
- Party: Conservative
- Other political affiliations: Conservative Party of Quebec
- Profession: lumber merchant

Georges Ball (September 11, 1838 – May 30, 1928), also known as George Ball, was a Canadian politician and lumber merchant.

Born in Champlain, Lower Canada, Ball was a member of the Legislative Assembly of Quebec for Nicolet from 1897 to 1900. He was elected to the House of Commons of Canada as a Member of the Conservative Party of Canada in the 1900 federal election for the riding of Nicolet. He was defeated in the 1904 federal election and again in the 1906 Nicolet by-election.

1900 Canadian federal election: Nicolet
Party	Candidate	Votes
Conservative	Georges Ball	2,277
Liberal	Charles Milot	2,136

1904 Canadian federal election: Nicolet
Party	Candidate	Votes
Liberal	Rodolphe Lemieux	2,698
Conservative	Georges Ball	2,356

By-election: On Mr. Lemieux being elected to sit for Gaspé, 3 December 1906

By-election on 29 December 1906
Party	Candidate	Votes
Liberal	Charles Ramsay Devlin	2,721
Conservative	Georges Ball	2,328
