= Arthur Trahan =

Canadian politician

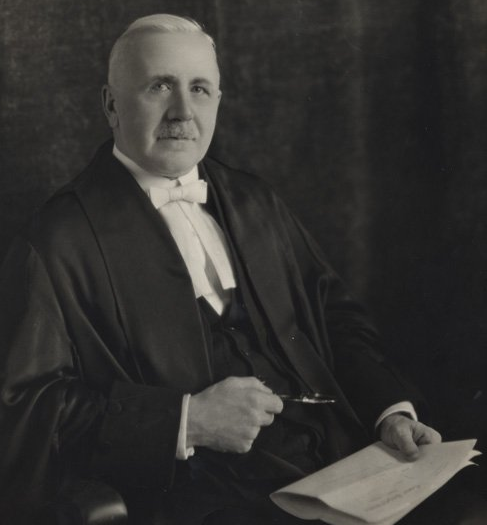

Member of the Canadian Parliament for Nicolet
- In office 1917–1923
- Preceded by: Paul-Émile Lamarche
- Succeeded by: Joseph-Félix Descôteaux

Member of the Legislative Assembly of Quebec for Nicolet
- In office 1913–1917
- Preceded by: Charles Ramsay Devlin
- Succeeded by: Joseph-Alcide Savoie

Personal details
- Born: March 26, 1877 Nicolet, Quebec
- Died: September 22, 1950 (aged 73) Montreal, Quebec
- Party: Liberal
- Other political affiliations: Quebec Liberal Party

Arthur Trahan, KC (May 26, 1877 – September 22, 1950) was a Canadian lawyer, judge and political figure in Quebec. He represented Nicolet in the Legislative Assembly of Quebec from 1913 to 1917 and Nicolet in the House of Commons of Canada from 1917 to 1923 as a :Liberal.

He was born in Nicolet, Quebec, the son of Narcisse Trahan and Adéline-Rébecca Rousseau, and was educated at the Séminaire de Nicolet and the Université Laval in Montreal. He was admitted to the Quebec bar in 1901 and set up practice in Nicolet. He was married twice: to Joséphine Dufresne in 1902 and to Diane Leduc in 1924. Trahan served as a member of the municipal council for Nicolet from 1911 to 1919. He was named King's Counsel in 1912. Trahan was bâtonnier for Trois-Rivières district in 1916 and 1917. He resigned his seat in the provincial assembly in 1917 to run for a federal seat. In 1923, Trahan resigned his seat in the House of Commons after he was named to the Quebec Superior Court. He died in Montreal at the age of 73 and was buried in Nicolet.

== Electoral record ==
1917 Canadian federal election: Nicolet
Party	Candidate	Votes
Liberal	Arthur Trahan	acclaimed

1921 Canadian federal election: Nicolet
Party	Candidate	Votes
Liberal	Arthur Trahan	8,298
Progressive	Fortunat Proulx	2,271
