= Gustave-Adolphe-Narcisse Turcotte =

Canadian politician and physician (1848–1918)

Gustave-Adolphe-Narcisse Turcotte (November 19, 1848 – October 4, 1918) was a Quebec physician and political figure. He represented Nicolet in the House of Commons of Canada as a Liberal member from 1907 to 1911. His name also appears as Gustave-Adolphe Turcotte.

He was born in Trois-Rivières, Canada East in 1848, the son of Joseph-Édouard Turcotte and Flore Buteau, and was educated at the Jesuit Collège Saint-Marie in Montreal and the Séminaire Saint-Joseph in Trois-Rivières. Turcotte served as registrar for Nicolet County. He ran unsuccessfully to represent Nicolet in the House of Commons in 1877 and 1878, losing to François-Xavier-Ovide Méthot each time. Turcotte was elected in a 1907 by-election held after Charles Ramsay Devlin resigned his seat to become a member of the Quebec cabinet. He was reelected in the 1908 federal election but was defeated when he ran for reelection in 1911.

He was married twice: first to Jeanne Leblanc and then to Emma, the daughter of Charles-Édouard Houde.

His illegitimate brother Arthur served in the Quebec assembly and was mayor of Trois-Rivières.

By-election on 18 December 1877
| Party | Candidate | Votes |
| Independent Conservative | François-Xavier-Ovide Méthot | 1,387 |
| Liberal | Gustave-Adolphe-Narcisse Turcotte | 1,018 |

1878 Canadian federal election: Nicolet
| Party | Candidate | Votes |
|---|---|---|
| Independent Conservative | François-Xavier-Ovide Méthot | 1,759 |
| Liberal | Gustave-Adolphe-Narcisse Turcotte | 1,018 |

1908 Canadian federal election: Nicolet
| Party | Candidate | Votes |
|---|---|---|
| Liberal | Gustave-Adolphe-Narcisse Turcotte | 2,718 |
| Conservative | Wilfrid Camirand | 2,052 |

1911 Canadian federal election: Nicolet
| Party | Candidate | Votes |
|---|---|---|
| Conservative | Paul-Émile Lamarche | 2,805 |
| Liberal | Gustave-Adolphe-Narcisse Turcotte | 2,721 |

Parliament of Canada
| Preceded by Charles Ramsay Devlin | Member of Parliament for Nicolet; 1907–1911 | Succeeded by Paul-Émile Lamarche |
