= Bernard Devlin =

Canadian politician

Bernard Devlin QC
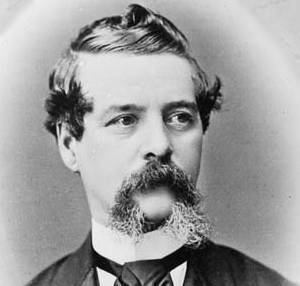

Member of the Canadian Parliament for Montreal Centre
- In office 1875–1878
- Preceded by: Michael Patrick Ryan
- Succeeded by: Michael Patrick Ryan

Personal details
- Born: 15 December 1824 Meera, County Roscommon, Ireland, UK
- Died: 7 February 1880 (aged 55) Denver, Colorado, US
- Resting place: Notre Dame des Neiges Cemetery
- Party: Liberal Party
- Spouse: Ann Eliza Hickey
- Relations: The Hon. Charles Ramsay Devlin, MP, Nephew, Emmanuel Berchmans Devlin, MP, Nephew
- Children: 8
- Profession: Lawyer, journalist

Bernard Devlin, QC (15 December 1824 – 7 February 1880) was an Irish-born lawyer, counsel to the Abraham Lincoln administration of the United States Government during the most northerly engagement of the United States Civil War, Quebec-based political figure and Canadian parliamentarian, and peer and political competitor of Thomas D'Arcy McGee. A champion of many causes, generally of a liberal persuasion, his abilities as a criminal advocate and oratorical skill established for him a wide reputation throughout the then-Dominion of Canada, and his motto: "justice and equality to all classes and creeds, undue favor to none" was far in advance of the tenor of the times.

== Early life ==
Born at Meera, outside present day Carrick-on-Shannon, County Roscommon, the eldest of seven siblings, son of extensive landed proprietor and merchant Owen Devlin and his wife Catherine Mullany. In his teens Devlin commenced the study of the medical profession under his uncle, well known practitioner Dr. Charles Devlin of Ballina, County Mayo, later moving to Dublin to complete his studies. The medical tradition ran strongly in the family, with two uncles (the aforementioned Dr. Charles Devlin, MD and his brother Mark Henry Devlin, MD) and two brothers (John Joseph Devlin, MD and Mark Devlin, MD) all qualifying and later serving as doctors either with the Royal College of Surgeons of Ireland, or its counterpart in England. Dr. Charles Devlin gave his life in 1847 at the age of 44 during the worst year of the Irish famine, serving the sick poor of a workhouse in Ballina, County Mayo. He had contracted "fever" (likely typhus) from his patients.

Leaving Ireland for Canada along with his father in 1844, the latter having suffered financial misfortunes, Devlin settled initially at Quebec City. Devlin's brother Charles, the future pioneer Mayor of Aylmer, Quebec, had arrived two years earlier, and his younger brother by 12 years, Owen Joseph Devlin, a notary, arrived some years afterwards. At Quebec, unable to practice medicine because he was less than 21 years of age, Devlin established a weekly newspaper with a liberal bias called the Freeman's Journal and Commercial Advertiser. He directed this newspaper from 1844 to 1847, after which he left for Montreal, where he continued his activity as a journalist and began the study of law under Edward Carter, QC, Member of Parliament in the House of Commons for Brome, Quebec.

== Professional career ==
Called to the Lower Canada Bar in 1847 (and later, in 1868, to the Bar of Upper Canada), Devlin set up practice in Montreal, operating initially on his own but later in association at different times and for varying periods with several others including Augustus Power, son of Quebec supreme court justice William Power, and Devlin's younger brother, notary Owen Joseph Devlin. His offices were variously located along St. James Street (present day rue St. Jacques). Devlin's preferred location for business socializing was the St. Lawrence Hall Hotel at 13 Great St. James Street, then considered the finest hotel establishment in the city. The St. Lawrence Hall had many prominent guests at the time, including the Prince of Wales (in 1861), Charles Dickens, John A. Macdonald and George Brown.

Noted for his "splendid abilities" and as "Canada's most prominent criminal lawyer", it was said of Devlin that "There may have been his equal but never his superior in Canada. Wonderful stories are told of the effects of his oratory and pleading upon the jury, and, as an old Montrealer remarked: "Many a man was saved from the gallows by his matchless pleading". Complementing his oratory was a keen knowledge of human nature, shown to best effect in the examination of witnesses.

Devlin rapidly established a large and lucrative practice in criminal law, and a wide reputation throughout the Dominion of Canada. For many years he served as counsel to the Montreal Harbor Commissioners, and joint City Attorney for Montreal up to December, 1875. Created a Queen's Counsel (QC) by the Joly Government of Quebec in 1878, few cases of major importance of a criminal nature took place without his taking part on one side or the other. Among other important causes Devlin was retained, in 1864, by the administration of Abraham Lincoln to serve as counsel in the prosecution at Montreal of the participants in the celebrated St. Albans, Vermont Raid, the most northerly incident of the United States Civil War.

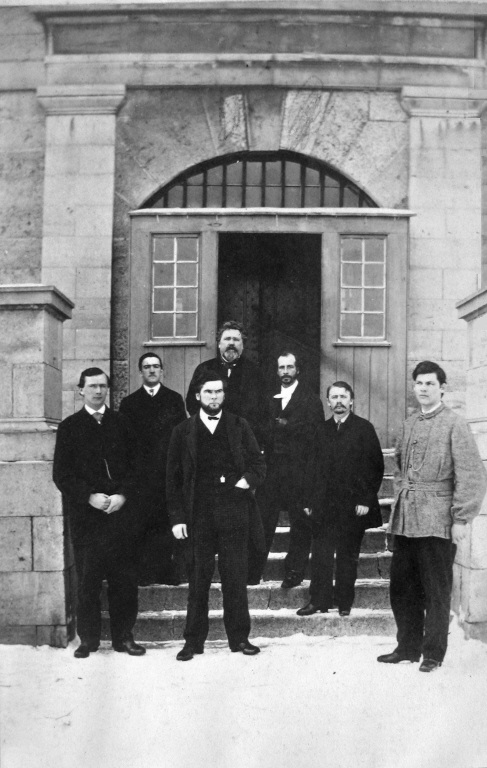
St Albans Confederate Raiders at the Montreal Jail, 1864

== St. Albans Confederate Raid ==
During the St. Albans Raid, the Confederate States of America sent a 22-man party (October, 1864) undercover to Montreal, which later infiltrated into Vermont (10–19 October) and took control (19 October) of the village of St. Albans, robbing several banks, attempting to burn buildings and causing some loss of life, before fleeing north again into Canada, hoping to draw the United States Army in pursuit across the frontier. The objective of the raid was to both raise money and draw Great Britain into the United States Civil War, thereby opening a second front against the North and drawing off resources that would otherwise be directed southward against Confederate forces. Devlin, on behalf of the United States Government, argued the raiders were criminals, not enemy combatants, and should be prosecuted accordingly. However, the court ultimately deemed the raiders legitimate soldiers of the Confederacy who could not be extradited, and they were freed, though shorn of their remaining cash from the raid.

The decision to release the raiders was seen by the Northern states as hostile to the Northern cause. Consequently, American troops were ordered to in future pursue raiders into Canada and destroy them if necessary. However, realizing that such a move would violate Canadian neutrality and precipitate war between the Union and Great Britain, thereby achieving one of the key goals established for the raid by the Confederacy and only serving to help the South, President Lincoln revoked the order.

The St. Albans Raiders case set several precedents in the area of extradition law and, despite his loss in court, established Devlin's reputation in this field of law. Drawing heavily on European and North American sources and precedents, quoting frequently in Latin and sometimes in French, Devlin's closing remarks to the judge and jury on the occasion provide an excellent overview of the state of international law and extradition law at the time.

On 21 April 1865, telegraphed information from Bernard Devlin to Charles Stanley, Lord Monck, then Governor-General of Canada, began the Canadian manhunt for Confederate sympathizer John Wilkes Booth, following the Assassination of Abraham Lincoln (14 April 1865). Booth had visited Montreal briefly in 1864, and it was believed that he and other guilty parties may have been hiding themselves in Canada. As the search began to heat up Booth however, was found dead in Virginia. It was then that discovery of a handkerchief at the Virginia site monogrammed for John Surratt, a rebel agent, gave police a continuous trail and confirmed that the conspirators were not within Canadian borders.

== Fenian Raids and military service ==
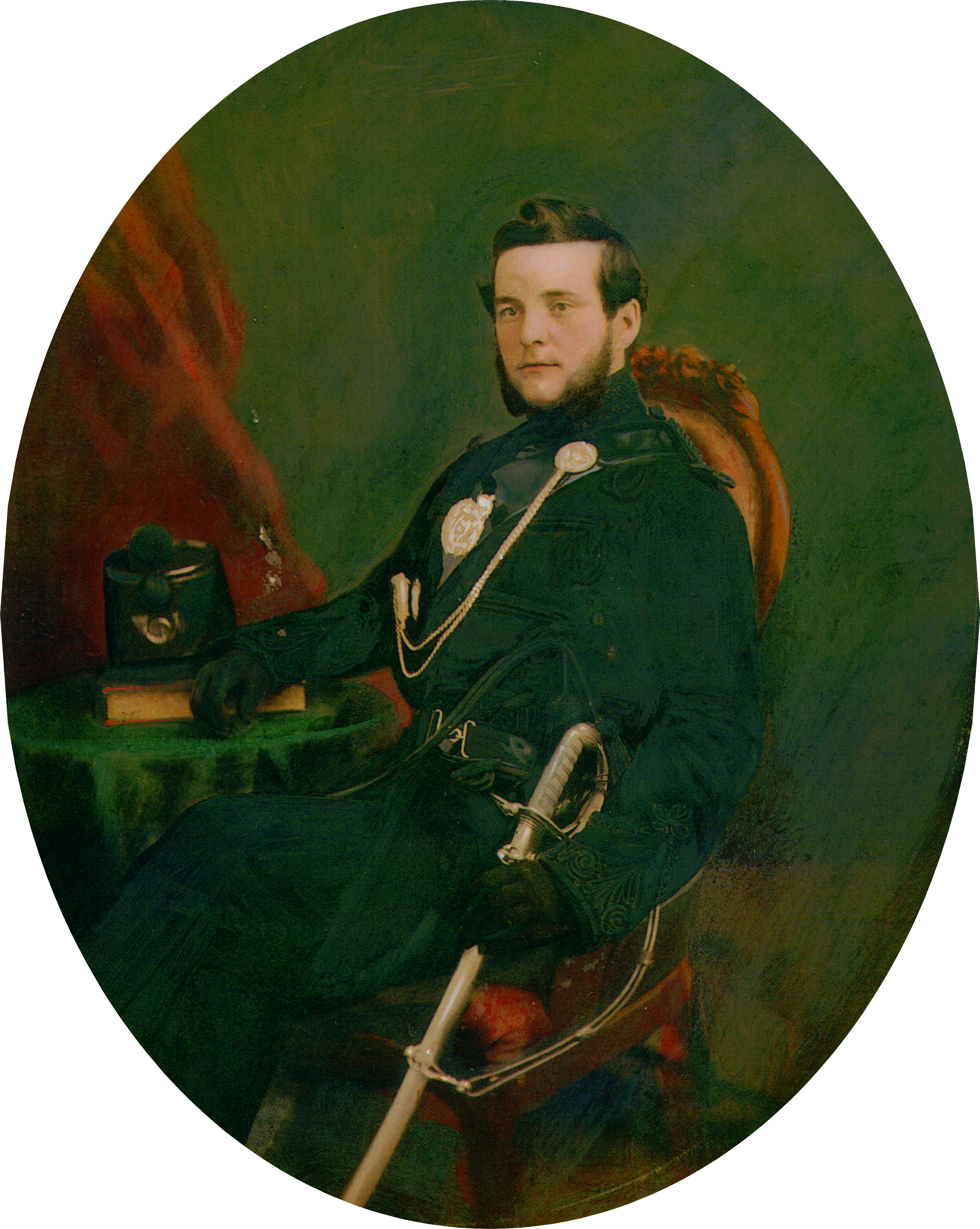
Lt. Col. Bernard Devlin in the regalia of the Prince of Wales Rifle Regiment, ca 1865, age 41

Officers of the Prince of Wales Regiment at Durham, Quebec, during the Fenian Raids, 1866

The St. Alban's Raid of 19 October 1864 was an incident unconnected to later raids from the vicinity of St. Albans, Vermont, on the Eastern Townships of Quebec in June 1866 and again in May 1870, by the Fenian Brotherhood, a group of Irish Americans whose goal was to free Ireland from Britain. Formed in 1857, the Fenians' plan was to attack British colonies in North America, thereby forcing Britain to send troops, weakening her defenses in Ireland. Fenian raids into Canada occurred in 1866 (New Brunswick, Ontario and Quebec), 1870 (Quebec) and 1871 (Manitoba). The Fenian threat helped forge a sense of unity among the British North American colonies, and added impetus to the move toward Canadian confederation, which occurred 1 July 1867, a year after the initial raid.

Opposed to the Fenian raids into Canada, although not unsympathetic to their cause of freedom for Ireland, Devlin was for fifteen years (1851-1866) closely identified with the active volunteer militia force. The militia also functioned as a further point of social activity and provided a platform for his political aspirations. Devlin organized an Irish Company for the 1st, or Prince of Wales Rifle Regiment, serving initially as a captain, later as Lieutenant-Colonel, of the unit. In this capacity he commanded the regiment during the Fenian raids of 1866, assigned to guard the border from Huntingdon to Hemmingford, Quebec, opposite New York State. For his services Devlin was publicly commended by Charles Stanley, Lord Monck, then Governor-General of Canada. He retired his command, retaining his rank, in August 1866.

== Political career and relationship with Thomas D'Arcy McGee ==
Devlin was a Liberal in politics, a consistent one, following the varying fortunes of his party and the Irish community with equanimity and courage. His involvement in politics commenced in the early years after his arrival in Canada. He is shown, for example, taking part in a meeting in Montreal advocating the repeal of the union of England and Ireland in 1848, and serving as a deputy returning officer for the Parish of St. Genevieve, County of Montreal, in the election of December 5–6, 1851. All the while he was rapidly establishing a burgeoning practice in criminal law, achieving success in the courts and renown for his oratory.

An Irish nationalist, though not a Fenian, and a highly visible and articulate champion of justice, Devlin had broad appeal among the Irish working classes of Montreal, and a reputation as the 'stormy petrel' of the Irish community.

A key platform for the enhancement and extension of his reputation was membership in the St. Patrick's Society of Montreal, a theoretically non-political organization founded in 1834 to care for Irish immigrants and to defend the local Irish-Canadian community's interests. Ultimately, Devlin went on to serve as President of the St. Patrick's Society for over ten years, the longest term of office held by any president of that association, which is still active (2013). He was elected in 1860, 1865, 1870 and finally in 1874.

It was in his capacity as a firmly entrenched leader maintaining a broad base of Irish nationalist support in the Montreal Irish community, that Devlin played a key role in the introduction of Thomas D'Arcy McGee to the St. Patrick's Society following his emigration to Canada from the United States in 1857, securing for McGee the support of Irish voters, and arranging his alliance with the so-called "anglo-rouges" in the election of 1857–58, an election that McGee went on to win. McGee, the ex "Young Irelander" rebel of 1848, had left the United States after becoming disillusioned with American republicanism and the position of the Irish there.

Following this promising start, the relationship between McGee and Devlin, and the broader mass of immigrant Irish voters in Montreal, deteriorated. In a speech given at Wexford, Ireland, in 1865, McGee came down heavily against Irish nationalism, describing the Young Irelanders with whom he had once shared common cause as a "pack of fools," castigating the Fenians as "Punch-and-Judy Jacobins," and arguing that the Irish in Canada possessed greater personal freedom, economic advantage, and religious equality within the British empire, than in the United States at the time. The Wexford speech enraged Irish republican-nationalists, especially in Canada, and by 1866 McGee's standing with his Irish constituents in Montreal, if not the conservative establishment sectors of society, had eroded significantly. The Fenians moved to take advantage of the situation, making inroads into the St. Patrick's Society, gathering support, and challenging their conservative opponents.

== Devlin-McGee confrontation ==
Bernard Devlin, Esq., QC, MP, by J. Walker, 1880

As the federal general election of 1867 approached, Devlin, the incumbent president of the St. Patrick's Society, declared that he would oppose McGee in the riding of Montreal West, running for the Liberals against McGee's Liberal-Conservatives. For their part the Fenians believed a Devlin victory would remove their now greatest enemy from the political scene and advance their cause. Devlin was not a Fenian. He was vocal in his praise for the new Dominion of Canada, wrapped up his speeches with three cheers for Queen Victoria, and had demonstrated his commitment to his new country by helping lead the defence of the Quebec border against Fenian invasion. Nonetheless he was an Irish nationalist and sympathized with its more radical republican elements. Seeing an opportunity to make common cause, he invited Montreal's Fenians to join his campaign. Fenians such as Henry Murphy and Francis Bernard McNamee served on Devlin's election committee, while W.B. Linehan and Daniel Lyons were among Devlin's most active backers.

The stakes were high, and the campaign that followed was brutal. Physical intimidation was used by Devlin's supporters to stop McGee men (women did not have the vote) from entering polling stations. In turn, McGee's people used economic intimidation to stop voters turning out for Devlin. McGee cited secret documents concerning Fenian organization, development and tactics employed to establish itself in Montreal, the details of which were given broad distribution by the establishment press, and later demonstrated to be largely accurate. Devlin countered by condemning McGee as a "foul informer, a corrupt witness, a knave, and a hypocrite", and denounced him as a modern-day Titus Oates. Claims, counter-claims, accusations and condemnations flew back and forth in the press.

In the end, drawing on establishment support, McGee managed to squeak out a win on election day, but only by 197 votes (2,675 to 2,478). In the heavily Irish St. Ann's and St. Lawrence's wards, Devlin had edged out McGee by 70 votes. The Montreal Herald, summing up the matter, reported that "the persons who voted against McGee were not of those who are usually called the respectable classes". Physical intimidation by Devlin men of McGee supporters and even police during the polling included outright beatings and the near-death of a police officer. When the results came through, Devlin's supporters rioted outside McGee's campaign headquarters, and shots were fired on both sides. Several weeks later, Devlin spat in McGee's face when the two encountered each other in the street.

The election of 1867 had generated strong passions. McGee had received death threats and been assigned police protection. The Fenians, although not constituting the majority of Devlin's supporters, had nonetheless played a significant role during the election and fallen not far short of achieving their goal of defeating McGee. Denied that outcome, the Fenian members of the St. Patrick's Society instead moved a motion to expel McGee from the Society, and stopped its subscription to the pro-McGee Canadian Freeman. Among the militant Devlin supporters during the 1867 election campaign was an Ottawa tailor by the name of Patrick James Whelan, who had previously declared that McGee was a traitor, that he should be shot, and that if no one else would do the job, he would do it himself. On 7 April 1868, McGee was shot dead on Sparks Street in Ottawa, a crime for which Whelan was later convicted and hanged.

Following McGee's assassination, support for Fenianism declined, although the movement retained enough sway among Irish Americans to attempt another invasion of Canada in 1870 from Vermont into the eastern townships of Quebec, where it was decisively defeated at the battle of Eccles Hill (25 May 1870). Nonetheless its strategy of working within a broad Irish nationalist coalition began to come apart. In Montreal, attempts by the Fenians to hold rallies in the months following the assassination were not well received. The assassination had alienated some members of the movement, and many of the movement's broader-minded allies, among them Bernard Devlin who, significantly, deprecated a meeting proposed for September 1868 as "a most mischievous and objectionable undertaking" which would damage the position of Irish Catholics in Montreal, whereupon his former Fenian supporters condemned him as a traitor and turncoat.

Bernard Devlin, MP, Speaking at Liberal Party Headquarters, rue St. Joseph, Montreal, on the Night of His Election, 12 January 1875

== Service in the House of Commons ==
1867: Ran as a Liberal against D'Arcy McGee (Liberal-Conservative) in the riding of Montreal West. Defeated by 197 votes (2,675 to 2,478). McGee went on to become a father of confederation (1 July 1867)
1874: Ran as a Liberal against Michael Patrick Ryan in the riding of Montreal Centre. Defeated, but succeeded in unseating Ryan on petition.
1875: Elected as a Liberal by acclamation in by-election of 12 January 1875 in the riding of Montreal Centre.
1875: Unseated on petition 26 August 1875; re-elected as a Liberal by acclamation in by-election of November 26, 1875 in riding of Montreal Centre, and sat in the House of Commons until the 1878 election.
1878: Ran again as a Liberal against Michael Patrick Ryan in the riding of Montreal Centre, and was defeated.

Speeches: Devlin's first speech was delivered on 12 February 1875 in support of amnesty for Louis Riel and Ambroise-Dydime Lépine. On 8 March 1875 he took an important part in the debate on a motion by John Costigan in favour of separate schools in New Brunswick. One of Devlin's most famous speeches was given on 19 March 1877, in which he proposed a study be made of the feasibility of giving better representation to minorities through a transformation of the electoral system.

== Community ==
Outside his profession, Bernard Devlin's interests were wide and varied, although the Irish community remained central to his concerns. In 1856, for example, he attended an Irish Convention held in Buffalo for the welfare of the Irish people. Years later, in the press of 20 September 1876, we find Devlin "arranging with the Government for the proper disposal of the remains of the unfortunate immigrants who died from ship fever in 1847 and were buried near the Wellington Bridge and vicinity". (A cemetery for the victims of the 'ship fever' (typhus) epidemic of 1847 had to be removed to make way for the enlargement of the Lachine Canal. The coffins dug up were moved to the Catholic cemetery at Notre-Dame-des-Neiges on Mount Royal.)

== Establishment of Mount Royal Park ==
From 1863 to 1870, Devlin sat as a member of the Montreal City Council and as alderman for St. Lawrence Ward. While there he proposed the establishment of Mount Royal Park on the mountain of the same name occupying the heart of the city. He fought long and ardently and finally succeeded in having his scheme adopted (1876), thus securing for Montreal one of the most beautiful public parks on the continent. His concurrent efforts as city attorney subsequently saved thousands of dollars for the city in park-related expropriation cases.

== Family ==
In 1848 Bernard Devlin married Anna Eliza Hickey, a native of Brooklyn, New York, daughter of John Hickey and Catherine Debin. Anna Eliza was said to have "brought tennis to Canada". From about 1860 onwards the family lived in a fine home in downtown Montreal known as Tara Hall, located at 52 Upper St. Urbain Street, just east of Park Avenue, with large grounds and wide verandahs. Today, Tara Hall Avenue runs through their property, remembering the name of their home.

Known as 'Barney' to his family, Devlin and his wife had eight children, five of whom died before the age of maturity (then age 21). Of the three survivors, Mary Lillian married Arthur Turcotte Genest, a prominent civil engineer of old Quebec stock, whose descendants included Major John Cuthbert Wickham, MD, CM, a long-serving medical veteran of the First World War; Francis ("Frank") Eugene married Maude Steele and went on to become a physician, surgeon and psychiatrist, head of the very large St. Jean de Dieu Hospital, and Crown alienist for the Province of Quebec; and Mary Gertrude ("Gert") married wealthy construction magnate James Thomas ("JT") Davis, involved with the concrete construction elements of the Lachine Canal, Trent-Severn waterway, Quebec bridge, Tay canal and other major water works, and residing in a mansion in the Square Mile area of Montreal at 3554 Drummond Street, now part of McGill University.

Funeral Cortege of Bernard Devlin, Esq., QC, MP, Passing Through Victoria Square, Montreal, 16 February 1880

Extended family included nephews, the future Minister and MP (Canada and Westminster) Charles Ramsay Devlin and the future MP Emmanuel Berchmans Devlin, sons of Bernard's brother Charles Devlin, pioneer mayor of Aylmer, Quebec.

== Death ==
Profoundly saddened by the early loss of the majority of his children and the premature death of his wife Anna Eliza at age 41 (13 June 1875), and weakened by the onset of tuberculosis, in 1879 Devlin traveled to Colorado seeking a cure, dying there on 7 February 1880.

Confirming the esteem in which he was held by the Irish community, upon the return of his remains to Montreal from Colorado the train was met at Bonaventure station by a large crowd, who, doing away with the hearse in attendance, raised the coffin to their shoulders and in groups of six changing every few hundred yards, carried the body of their former leader to the St. Lawrence Hall Hotel, where it lay in state for three days, preceding a public funeral.

His funeral was witnessed by an enormous crowd with all classes turning out en masse, an event recorded for posterity by JC Walker, one of the better artists of the time. The funeral cortege wound its way through the heart of the city from the St. Lawrence Hall Hotel, along St. James Street, through Victoria Square past the statue of Queen Victoria and up the mountain along Cote des Neiges to Notre Dame des Neiges Cemetery, where Devlin was buried at the Devlin monument (now Devlin-Wickham), ironically within clear sight of, and just down the same byway from, his former foe D'Arcy McGee's mausoleum.

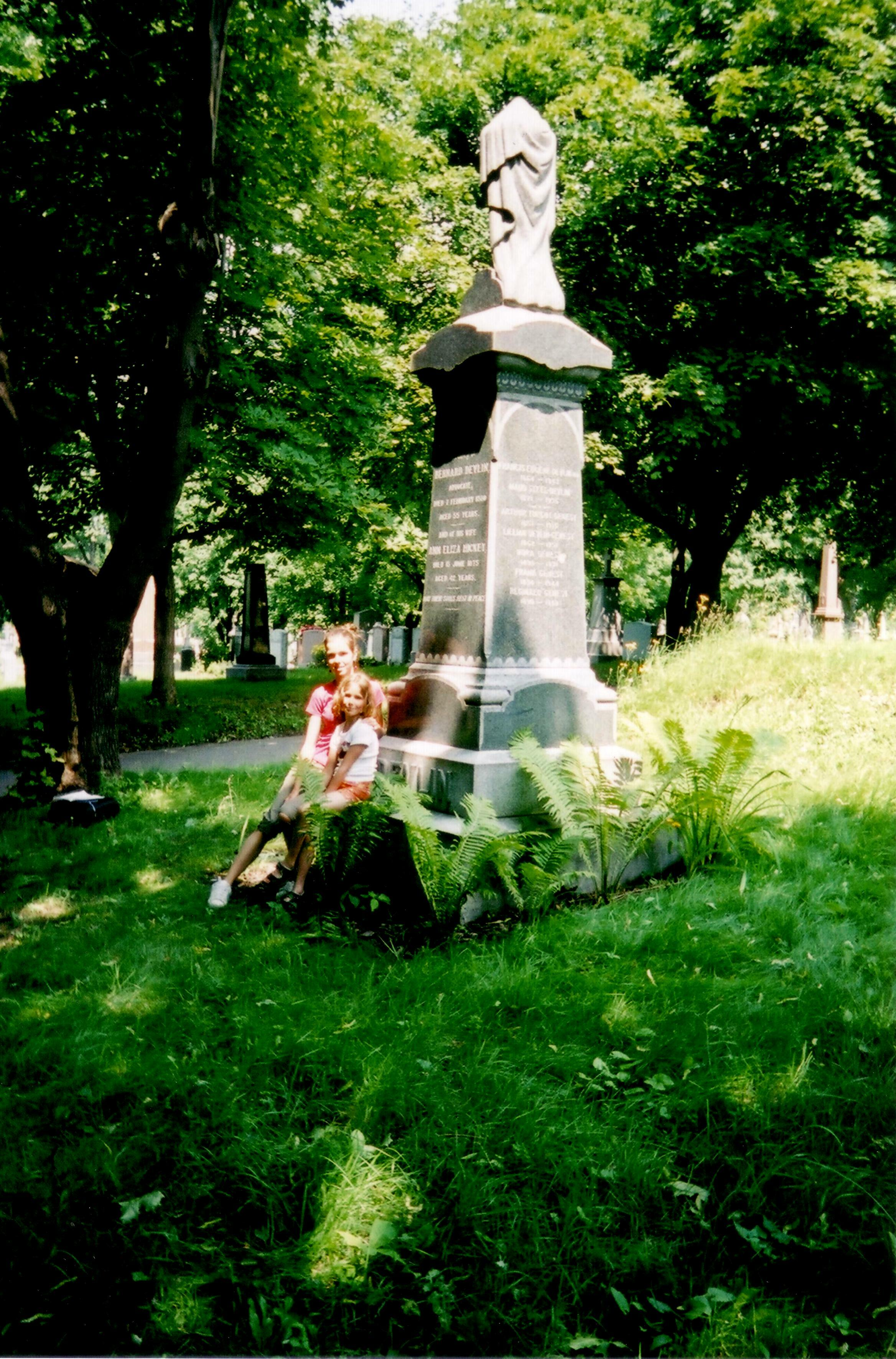
Devlin-Wickham Monument, Notre-Dame-Des-Neiges Cemetery, Montreal, Quebec
