= Beaubien =

Beaubien may refer to:

- Beaubien (surname)
- Beaubien House, headquarters of the Michigan Architectural Foundation
- Beaubien Street, a street in Montreal
- Beaubien station, on the Orange Line of the Montreal Metro rapid transit system
- Beaubien Camp, a location in the Boy Scout Philmont Scout Ranch in New Mexico
