= François-Xavier-Ovide Méthot =

Canadian politician

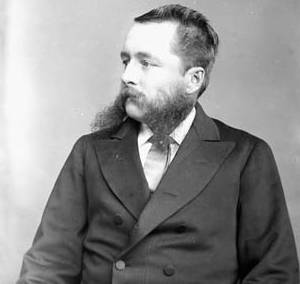

Member of the Legislative Assembly of Quebec for Nicolet
- In office 1871–1876
- Preceded by: Joseph Gaudet
- Succeeded by: Charles-Édouard Houde

Member of the Canadian Parliament for Nicolet
- In office 1877–1884
- Preceded by: Joseph Gaudet
- Succeeded by: Athanase Gaudet

Member of the Legislative Council of Quebec for De la Vallière
- In office 1884–1908
- Preceded by: Jean-Baptiste-Georges Proulx
- Succeeded by: Adélard Turgeon

Personal details
- Born: September 19, 1843 Quebec City, Canada East
- Died: October 19, 1908 (aged 65) Saint-Pierre-les-Becquets, Quebec
- Party: Conservative
- Relations: François-Xavier Méthot, father

François-Xavier-Ovide Méthot (September 19, 1843 – October 19, 1908) was a Quebec farmer and political figure. He represented Nicolet in the Legislative Assembly of Quebec from 1871 to 1876 and in the House of Commons of Canada as an Independent Conservative member from 1877 to 1884.

He was born in Quebec City, Canada East in 1843, the son of François-Xavier Méthot, and studied at the Séminaire de Québec. He married his cousin Clara, the daughter of Antoine-Prosper Méthot, in 1864. Méthot was a farmer at Saint-Pierre-les-Becquets and served as mayor there from 1868 to 1872. In 1871, he was elected to the legislative assembly of the province in Nicolet as a Conservative; he was reelected in 1875 but his election was declared invalid by the Quebec Superior Court in June 1876. He did not run again in the subsequent by-election but was elected to the federal parliament in an 1877 by-election after the then-sitting member was named to the Legislative Council of Quebec. Méthot represented Nicolet until 1884, when he was named to the Legislative Council of Quebec in De La Vallière district. He remarried in 1885; his second wife was Marie-Clara-Louise-Ernestine Paradis. He died in office at Saint-Pierre-les-Becquets in 1908.

== Electoral record ==
By-election on 18 December 1877
Party	Candidate	Votes
Independent Conservative	François-Xavier-Ovide Méthot	1,387
Liberal	Gustave-Adolphe-Narcisse Turcotte	1,018

1878 Canadian federal election: Nicolet
Party	Candidate	Votes
Independent Conservative	François-Xavier-Ovide Méthot	1,759
Liberal	Gustave-Adolphe-Narcisse Turcotte	1,018

1882 Canadian federal election: Nicolet
Party	Candidate	Votes
Independent Conservative	François-Xavier-Ovide Méthot	acclaimed
