= Camille Roy =

Camille Roy may refer to:

- Camille Roy (politician)
- Camille Roy (literary critic)
