= Beaubien (surname) =

Beaubien is a surname. Notable people with the surname include:

- Arthur-Lucien Beaubien (1879–1971), Canadian politician and farmer
- Charles Beaubien (1748–1794), French Canadian trader
- Charles H. Beaubien (1800–1864), Canadian-born American fur trader
- Joseph-Octave Beaubien (1824–1877), Quebec physician and political figure
- Layne Beaubien (born 1976), American water polo player
- Louis Beaubien (1837–1915), Canadian politician
- Louis-Philippe Beaubien (1903–1985), Canadian politician
- Marcel Beaubien (born c. 1942), Canadian politician
- Mark H. Beaubien Jr. (1942–2011), American politician
- Philippe de Gaspé Beaubien (1928–2025), Canadian media proprietor
- Pierre Beaubien (1796–1881), Canadian physician and political figure
