= Joseph-Alcide Savoie =

Canadian politician

Member of the Legislative Assembly of Quebec for Nicolet
- In office 1917–1933
- Preceded by: Arthur Trahan
- Succeeded by: Alexandre Gaudet

Personal details
- Born: June 5, 1872 Saint-Albert-de-Warwick, Quebec
- Died: February 4, 1933 (aged 60) Sherbrooke, Quebec
- Party: Liberal
- Relations: François-Théodore Savoie, father

Joseph-Alcide Savoie (June 5, 1872 – February 4, 1933) was a Canadian politician.

Born in Saint-Albert-de-Warwick, Quebec, the son of François-Théodore Savoie, Savoie was acclaimed to the Legislative Assembly of Quebec for Nicolet in a 1917 by-election. A Liberal, he was acclaimed again in 1919. He was elected in 1923, 1927, and 1931. He died in office in Sherbrooke, Quebec.
