= Fabien Boisvert =

Canadian politician

Member of the Canadian Parliament for Nicolet
- In office 1888–1896
- Preceded by: Athanase Gaudet
- Succeeded by: Joseph Hector Leduc

Personal details
- Born: June 21, 1839 Bécancour, Lower Canada
- Died: November 12, 1897 (aged 58) Unknown
- Party: Independent Conservative Party
- Spouse: Marie Philomene Hamel
- Occupation: farmer

Fabien Boisvert (June 21, 1839 – November 12, 1897) was a politician, land surveyor and farmer. He was elected to the House of Commons of Canada in an 1888 by-election as an independent Conservative-affiliated Member to represent the riding of Nicolet after the death of Athanase Gaudet. He was re-elected in 1896.

He was the son of Dominique Boisvert and was educated at the Séminaire de Nicolet. In 1867, he married Marie Philomene Hamel. Boisvert also served as president of the local school board. He died in office at the age of 58.

By-election on 17 July 1888
Party	Candidate	Votes
Independent Conservative	Fabien Boisvert	1,582
Unknown	Archambault	1,469
