= Joseph-Victor Monfette =

Canadian politician

Member of the Legislative Assembly of Quebec for Nicolet
- In office 1890–1892
- Preceded by: Honoré Brunelle Tourigny
- Succeeded by: Louis Beaubien

Personal details
- Born: October 13, 1841 Saint-Pierre-les-Becquets, Canada East
- Died: September 16, 1924 (aged 82) Sainte-Sophie-de-Lévrard, Quebec
- Party: Liberal

Joseph-Victor Monfette (October 13, 1841 – September 16, 1924) was a farmer and political figure in Quebec. He represented Nicolet in the Legislative Assembly of Quebec as a member of the Parti National.

He was born in Saint-Pierre-les-Becquets, Canada East, the son of Jean-Baptiste Monfet and Rosalie Gagnon. Monfette was a justice of the peace and owned a farm at Sainte-Sophie-de-Lévrard. Monfette was married twice: to Elmire Tousignant in 1866 and to Célina Legendre (née Pépin) in 1901. He was mayor of Sainte-Sophie-de-Lévrard from 1882 to 1890, from 1896 to 1901 and from 1910 to 1913. He died in Sainte-Sophie-de-Lévrard at the age of 82.
