= Wright (electoral district) =

Former federal electoral district in Quebec, Canada

Quebec electoral district

Defunct federal electoral district
- Legislature: House of Commons
- District created: 1892
- District abolished: 1947
- First contested: 1896
- Last contested: 1945

Wright was a federal electoral district in Quebec, Canada, that was represented in the House of Commons of Canada from 1896 to 1948.

This riding was created in 1892 from parts of the County of Ottawa riding. The electoral district was abolished in 1947 when it was merged into Gatineau riding.

== Geography ==
In 1892, it consisted of the city of Hull, the town of Aylmer, the township of Templeton, including the village of Pointe-à-Gatineau, the townships of Hull, Eardley, Masham, Wakefield, Lowe, Denholm, Aylwin, Hincks, Bowman, Bigelow, Blake, Northfield, Wright, Bouchette, Cameron, Wabasse, Bouthillier, Kensington, Maniwaki, Egan, Lytton, Sicotte, Aumond, Robertson, and all the unorganized territories west of the River du Lièvre to the southern boundary of the county of Montcalm.

In 1903, it was redefined to consist of:

- the townships of Aylwin, Aumond, Baskatong, Bouchette, Cameron, Denholm, Eardley, Egan, Hincks, Hull, Kensington, Low, Lytton, Maniwaki, Masham, Northfield, Sicotte, Templeton, Wakefield and Wright,
- the villages and other municipal subdivisions of those townships,
- the city of Hull,
- the town of Aylmer, and
- all of the unorganized territory bounded on the north-east by the county of Montcalm and on the east by a line formed by the production northwards of the eastern boundary line of the township of Baskatong.

In 1915, it was redefined to exclude Hull City, East and West Hull, Gatineau Point, East, West and North Templeton, and the municipality of South Hull, which were transferred to the new electoral district of Hull.

In 1924, it was redefined to consist of the part of the County of Hull not included in the electoral district of Hull, together with that part of the County of Labelle included in the township of Blake.

In 1933, it was redefined to consist of:

- the county of Gatineau; and
- that part of the county of Labelle included in the township of Blake.

== Members of Parliament ==
This riding elected the following members of Parliament:

Parliament	Years	Member	Party
Wright; Riding created from County of Ottawa
8th	1896–1897	Charles Ramsay Devlin	Liberal
8th	1897–1900	Louis Napoléon Champagne	Liberal
9th	1900–1904	Louis Napoléon Champagne	Liberal
10th	1904–1905	Wilfrid Laurier	Liberal
10th	1905–1908	Emmanuel Berchmans Devlin	Liberal
11th	1908–1911	Emmanuel Berchmans Devlin	Liberal
12th	1911–1917	Emmanuel Berchmans Devlin	Liberal
13th	1917–1921	Emmanuel Berchmans Devlin	Opposition (Laurier Liberals)
14th	1921–1925	Romuald Montézuma Gendron	Liberal
15th	1925–1926	Fizalam-William Perras	Liberal
16th	1926–1930	Fizalam-William Perras	Liberal
17th	1930–1935	Fizalam-William Perras	Liberal
18th	1935–1936	Fizalam-William Perras	Liberal
18th	1936–1940	Rodolphe Leduc	Liberal
19th	1940–1945	Rodolphe Leduc	Liberal
20th	1945–1949	Léon Raymond	Liberal
Riding dissolved into Gatineau

== Election results ==
1896 Canadian federal election
Party	Candidate	Votes
Liberal	Charles Ramsay Devlin	2,975
Conservative	J. M. McDougall	2,593

By-election: On Mr. Devlin being appointed trade commissioner to Ireland, 15 March 1897

By-election on 23 March 1897
Party	Candidate	Votes
Liberal	Louis Napoléon Champagne	2,842
Conservative	J. M. McDougall	2,067

1900 Canadian federal election
Party	Candidate	Votes
Liberal	Louis Napoléon Champagne	2,953
Conservative	J. M. McDougall	2,074

1904 Canadian federal election
Party	Candidate	Votes	%	Elected
Liberal	Wilfrid Laurier	3,250	61.39	✓
Conservative	F. A. A. Labelle	2,044	38.61	
Total valid votes		5,294	100.00	
Source(s) "Wright, Quebec (1896-04-24 - 1949-04-29)". History of Federal Ridings Since 1867. Library of Parliament.

By-election: Mr. Laurier elected to sit for Quebec East, 20 January 1905

Canadian federal by-election, 13 February 1905
Party	Candidate	Votes
Liberal	Emmanuel Berchmans Devlin	1,857
Conservative	J. M. McDougall	1,685
Independent Conservative	Louis Cousineau	655

1908 Canadian federal election
Party	Candidate	Votes
Liberal	Emmanuel Berchmans Devlin	3,562
Conservative	François Amable Albert Labelle	2,851

1911 Canadian federal election
Party	Candidate	Votes
Liberal	Emmanuel Berchmans Devlin	4,003
Conservative	Louis Cousineau	2,819

1917 Canadian federal election
Party	Candidate	Votes
Opposition (Laurier Liberals)	Emmanuel Berchmans Devlin	2,860
Government (Unionist)	Andrew Pritchard	1,318

1921 Canadian federal election
Party	Candidate	Votes
Liberal	Romuald Montézuma Gendron	4,510
Progressive	Herbert Miller Ellard	1,590
Conservative	François-Albert Labelle	1,551

1925 Canadian federal election
Party	Candidate	Votes
Liberal	Fizalam-William Perras	4,685
Conservative	François-Albert Labelle	3,973

1926 Canadian federal election
Party	Candidate	Votes
Liberal	Fizalam-William Perras	5,950
Conservative	François-Albert Labelle	5,105

1930 Canadian federal election
Party	Candidate	Votes
Liberal	Fizalam-William Perras	6,015
Conservative	Louis Cousineau	4,932

1935 Canadian federal election
Party	Candidate	Votes
Liberal	Fizalam-William Perras	5,945
Conservative	Jean-Noël Beauchamp	2,540
Reconstruction	Wilfrid-Jean Lavigne	1,296
Independent	Freeman Thomas Cross	825

By-election: On Mr. Perras' death, 28 June 1936

By-election on 3 August 1936
Party	Candidate	Votes
Liberal	Rodolphe Leduc	acclaimed

1940 Canadian federal election
Party	Candidate	Votes
Liberal	Rodolphe Leduc	7,260
National Government	Halliday Bell	2,310
Independent Liberal	Augustin Hubert	1,172

1945 Canadian federal election
Party	Candidate	Votes
Liberal	Léon Raymond	6,460
Progressive Conservative	John Charles Logue	2,634
Co-operative Commonwealth	Jean-Paul Desjardins	1,067
Bloc populaire	Ludger Lécuyer	1,019
Independent PC	Alphée Lavigne	352
Independent Liberal	Gérald Favier	174

== See also ==
- List of Canadian electoral districts
- Historical federal electoral districts of Canada
