= Theodore Davis (Canadian politician) =

Canadian politician

Theodore Davis (c. 1778 – March 16, 1841) was an American-born merchant, surveyor and political figure in Lower Canada.

He was born in Chesterfield, New Hampshire around 1778. Davis received his commission as surveyor in 1799 and set up practice at Saint-André-d'Argenteuil. He surveyed Hull County for Philemon Wright and was also involved in the construction of locks at Vaudreuil. Davis later operated a store at Pointe-Fortune. Around 1806, he married Elizabeth, the daughter of Daniel Robertson. In 1827, he was named a justice of the peace and, in 1834, was named registrar for Deux-Montagnes district. He was elected to represent Ottawa in the Legislative Assembly of Lower Canada when a second seat was added to the riding in 1832 following the 1831 census. Davis opposed the Ninety-Two Resolutions. He died at Hull in 1841.
