= Louis Napoléon Champagne =

Canadian politician

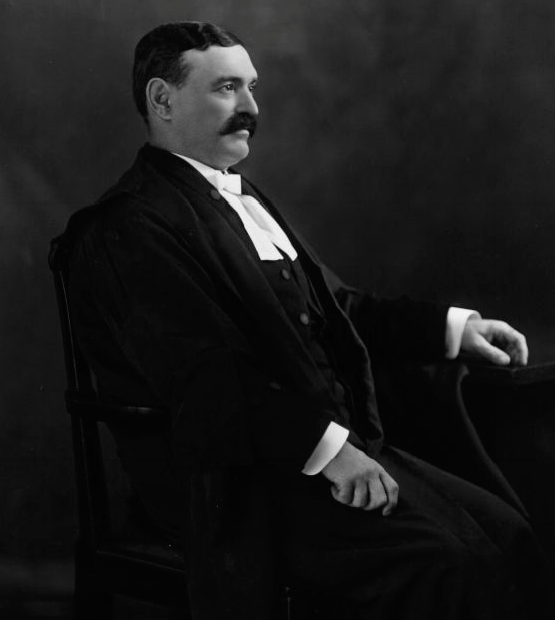

Member of the Canadian Parliament for Wright
- In office 1897–1904
- Preceded by: Charles Ramsay Devlin
- Succeeded by: Wilfrid Laurier

Personal details
- Born: November 21, 1860 Saint-Eustache, Canada East
- Died: October 15, 1911 (aged 50)
- Party: Liberal

Louis Napoléon Champagne (November 21, 1860 – October 15, 1911) was a lawyer, judge and political figure in Quebec. He represented Wright in the House of Commons of Canada from 1897 to 1904 as a Liberal.

He was born in Saint-Eustache, Canada East, the son of Charles Champagne and his wife Aglaé. He was educated at the Séminaire de Saint-Hyacinthe and the Université Laval. Champagne was admitted to the Quebec bar in 1882 and set up practice in Hull. He served as solicitor for the town of Hull and was mayor in 1893 and 1896. Champagne was also bâtonnier for Ottawa district. He was first elected to the House of Commons in an 1897 by-election held after Charles Ramsay Devlin was named trade commissioner to Ireland. Champagne was reelected in the 1900 federal election. In 1904, he was the named judge in the Quebec Superior Court for the newly formed Pontiac district. He was transferred to the Ottawa district in 1910. He died in Ottawa at the age of 50.
