= Nicolet (provincial electoral district) =

Quebec electoral district

Defunct provincial electoral district
- Legislature: National Assembly of Quebec
- District created: 1867
- District abolished: 1972
- District re-created: 1980
- District re-abolished: 1988
- First contested: 1867
- Last contested: 1985

Nicolet (French pronunciation: [nikɔlɛ(t)]) was a provincial electoral district in the Montérégie region of Quebec, Canada.

It was created for the 1867 election (and an electoral district of that name existed earlier in the Legislative Assembly of the Province of Canada and the Legislative Assembly of Lower Canada). It disappeared in the 1973 election and its successor electoral district was Nicolet-Yamaska. Nicolet-Yamaska, in turn, disappeared in the 1981 election and Nicolet reappeared. However, Nicolet's final election was in 1985. It disappeared for good in the 1989 election and its successor electoral district was the re-created Nicolet-Yamaska.

It was named in honour of French explorer Jean Nicolet who also worked for the Company of One Hundred Associates in the 17th century.

== Members of the Legislative Assembly / National Assembly ==
- Joseph Gaudet, Conservative Party (1867–1871)
- Francois-Xavier Méthot Jr., Conservative Party (1871–1876)
- Charles-Édouard Houde, Conservative Party (1876–1883)
- Louis-Trefflé Dorais, Conservative Independent (1883–1888)
- Honoré Brunelle Tourigny, Conservative (1888–1890)
- Joseph-Victor Monfette, Parti national (1890–1892)
- Louis Beaubien, Conservative Party (1892–1897)
- Georges Ball, Conservative Party (1897–1900)
- Edmund James Flynn, Conservative Party (1900–1904)
- Alfred Marchildon, Liberal (1904–1907)
- Charles Ramsay Devlin, Liberal (1907–1912)
- Arthur Trahan, Liberal (1913–1917)
- Joseph-Alcide Savoie, Liberal (1917–1933)
- Alexandre Gaudet, Liberal (1933–1936)
- Émery Fleury, Union Nationale (1936–1939)
- Henri-Napoléon Biron, Liberal (1939–1944)
- Émery Fleury, Union Nationale (1944–1952)
- Camille Roy, Union Nationale (1952–1962)
- Germain Hebert, Liberal (1962–1966)
- Clément Vincent, Union Nationale (1966–1973)
- did not exist (1973–1981), see Nicolet-Yamaska
- Yves Beaumier, Parti Québécois (1981–1985)
- Maurice Richard, Liberal (1985–1989)

== Election results ==
1985 Quebec general election
Party	Candidate	Votes	%	±%
Liberal	Maurice Richard	15,816	59.01	
Parti Québécois	Yves Beaumier	10,421	38.88	
New Democratic	Normand Villeneuve	425	1.59	
Christian Socialist	Hélène Couture	139	0.52	
Total valid votes		26,801	100.00	
Rejected and declined votes		286		
Turnout		27,087	84.93	
Electors on the lists		31,894		
Source: Official Results, Le Directeur général des élections du Québec.
