= Françoise Gaudet-Smet =

Canadian writer

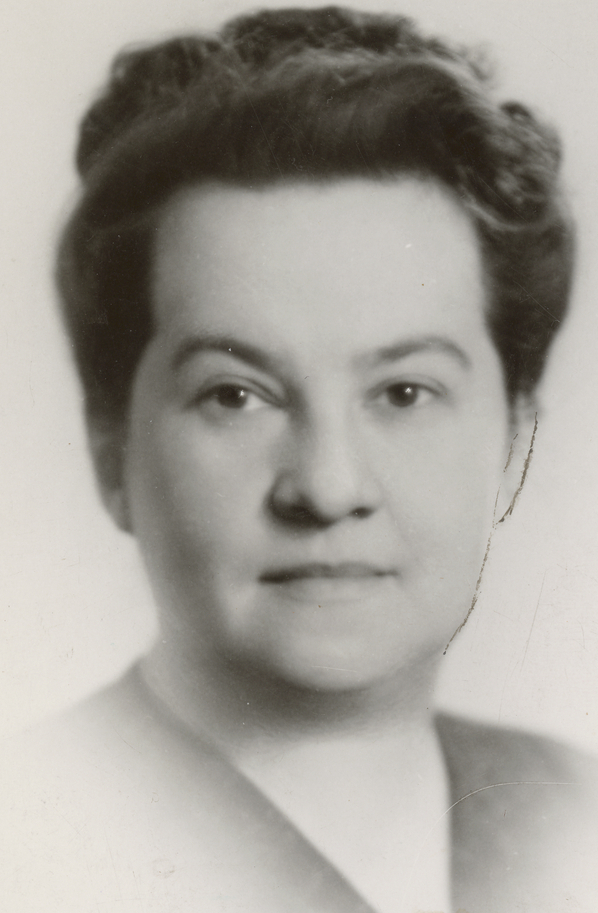
Françoise Gaudet-Smet, 1902-1986

Françoise Gaudet-Smet (October 26, 1902 – September 4, 1986) was a Canadian writer living in Quebec.

The daughter of Alexandre Gaudet and Flore Bourgeois, she was born Françoise Gaudet in Sainte-Eulalie. She attended primary school there, secondary school at the convent of the Sisters of the Assumption and continued her education at the École normale de Nicolet. After completing her education, she worked in her father's business.

She began work as a journalist around 1926. In 1934, she was secretary for Olivar Asselin and editor of the women's pages of Le Canada. She founded the journal Paysana in 1938 and served as its director until it ceased operation in 1949. She was responsible for the radio programs Notre pain quotidien and V'là le bon vent on CKAC and De fils en aiguille and Le réveil rural on Radio-Canada. She was also co-host for the television program Voix de femmes and then host of Sans détour on CHLT – Sherbrooke. She was also a contributor to the newspapers La Presse, Le Devoir, Montréal-Matin, Le Nouvelliste and La Tribune.

In 1946, she founded the Centre Social Claire-Vallée and served as its director until the early 1960s. In 1974, she founded a cultural and educational centre, the Gaudet Bourg Centre, in Aston-Jonction. She also taught continuing education at the Université du Québec à Trois-Rivières.

From 1969 to 1971, she was president of the Cercle des femmes journalistes and, from 1981 to 1984, of the Fondation de l'Hôpital du Christ-Roi.

She was married twice: to Paul Smet in 1934 (he died in 1950) and then to Samuel Brisson in 1965.

In 1974, Gaudet Smet was named to the Order of Canada. In 1985, she was named a Chevalier in the National Order of Quebec.
