= Rodolphe Leduc =

Canadian politician

Rodolphe Leduc (April 11, 1902 – December 2, 1993) was a Canadian politician.

Born in Sarsfield, Ontario, the son of Alfred Leduc and Célinas Bertrand, he graduated from the Université de Montréal with a Doctorate in Dental Surgery in 1924. Dr. Leduc established his first dental practice in Maniwaki, Quebec shortly after graduation. In 1926, he married Irene Nault (1904–2005) of Maniwaki. First elected as a member of the Liberal Party to the House of Commons in 1936 representing the district of Wright, he served until 1945 and then subsequently from 1954 to 1966. Dr. Leduc was the only French Canadian member of Parliament to support Mackenzie King's Conscription bill during World War II, a stance which was highly unpopular but which reflected his deep belief in the Canadian federalist system.

An avid fisherman and hunter, Dr. Leduc established a popular tourist camp on 31 Mile Lake near Maniwaki, Quebec. Dr. Leduc won several Arizona state shuffleboard championships during his winter retirement there.

Dr. and Mrs. Leduc had 6 children: Jeannine, Pauline, Bernard, Fernand, Lise and Renee.

Parliament of Canada
Preceded by Fizalam-William Perras	Member of Parliament for Wright; 1936–1945	Succeeded by Léon-Joseph Raymond
Preceded by Joseph-Célestin Nadon	Member of Parliament for Gatineau; 1954–1965	Succeeded by Gaston Isabelle
