= Charles-Philippe Beaubien =

Canadian politician (1870–1949)

The Honourable Charles-Philippe Beaubien
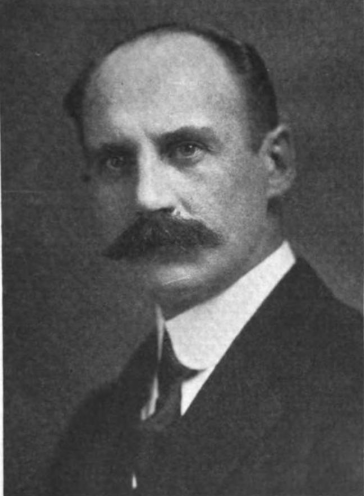

Senator for Montarville, Quebec
- In office 1915–1949
- Appointed by: Robert Borden
- Preceded by: Charles Boucher de Boucherville
- Succeeded by: Adélard Godbout

Personal details
- Born: May 10, 1870 Montreal, Quebec
- Died: January 17, 1949 (aged 78)
- Resting place: Notre Dame des Neiges Cemetery
- Party: Conservative

Charles-Philippe Beaubien (French pronunciation: [ʃaʁl filip bobjɛ̃]; May 10, 1870 – January 17, 1949) was a lawyer and political figure in Quebec. He sat for Montarville division in the Senate of Canada from 1915 to 1949.

He was born in Outremont, the son of Louis Beaubien and Suzanne Lauretta Stuart. Beaubien was educated at the Collège Sainte-Marie and the Université Laval in Montreal. He was admitted to the Quebec bar in 1894. In 1899, he married Margaret Rosemary Power. He was director for several companies including Atlantic Sugar Refineries, Dominion Steel Corporation et Canada Fire Insurance. Beaubien died in office at the age of 78.

After his death in 1949, he was entombed at the Notre Dame des Neiges Cemetery in Montreal. His son Louis-Philippe Beaubien also served in the Canadian senate.
