= Alonzo Wright =

Canadian politician

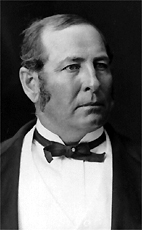
Alonzo Wright

Alonzo Wright (April 28, 1821 – January 7, 1894) was a Canadian member of Parliament and businessman commonly known as "King of the Gatineau".

He was born in Hull, Quebec in 1821. He was a grandson of Philemon Wright, and son of Tiberius Wright. He earned his fortune in the family's lumber business.

In 1848, he married Mary Sparks, who was the daughter of Nicholas Sparks and Sarah Olmstead Wright, the widow of his uncle.

In 1863, he was elected in the Ottawa (County) riding of Canada East to the Legislative Assembly of the Province of Canada. He continued to represent this district until 1891, after 1867 as a member of the House of Commons of Canada.

He died in 1894 at Ironside, Quebec, now part of the city of Gatineau.

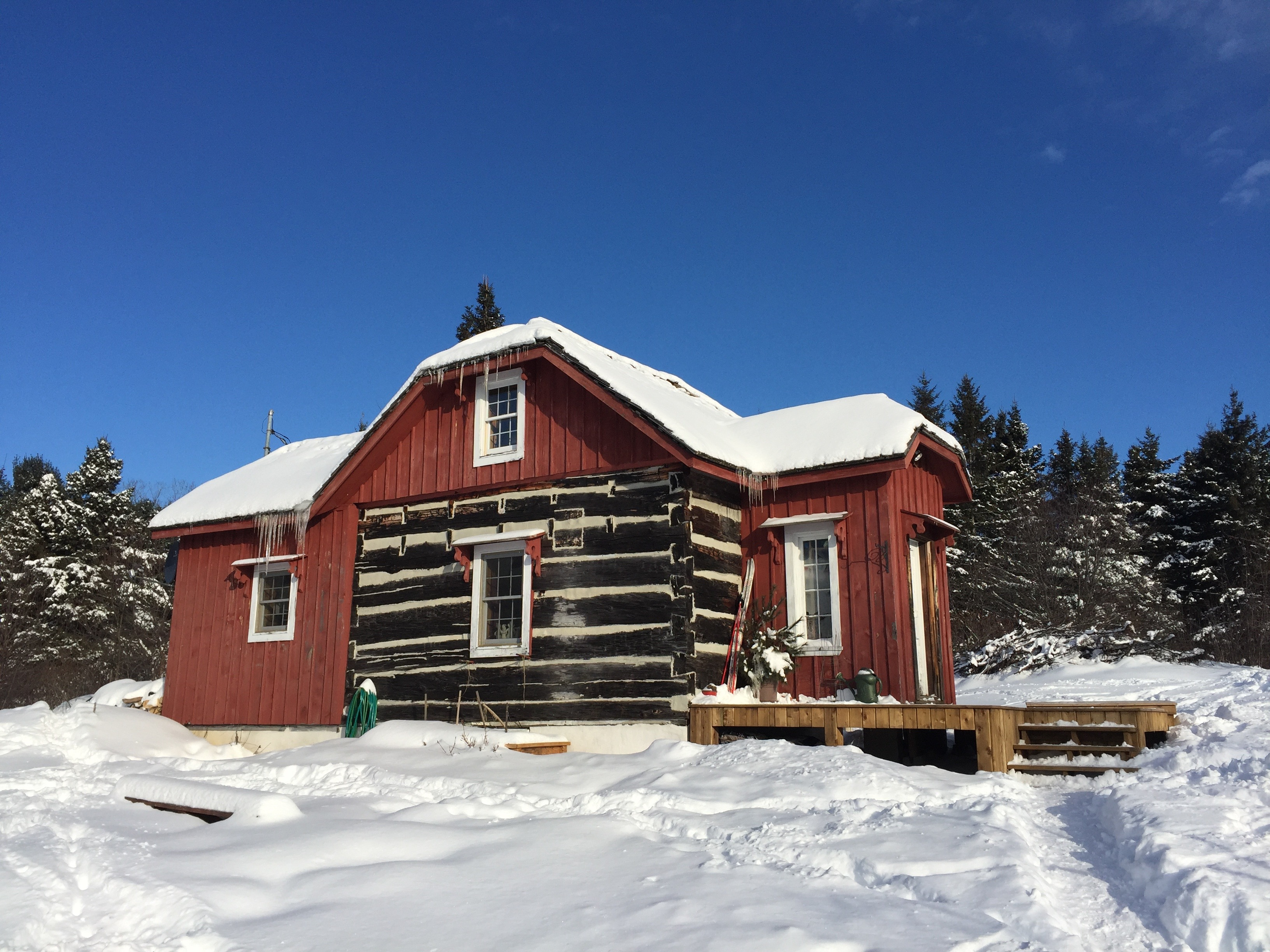
Tiberius Wright house

The Alonzo-Wright Bridge over the Gatineau River was named after him. Although Wright wasn't involved in the construction of this bridge, he did have a role in petitioning for the replacement of the ferry service at this location by a bridge. His original homestead became the Collège Saint-Alexandre. According to the current owners, the log cabin now located at 893 av. Gatineau, known locally as the "Little Red House" built by Alonzo's father, Tiberius, served as the family residence in the 1830s. It dates from as early as 1824, possibly making it the oldest building in the Outaouais region in Quebec.

== Electoral record ==
1867 Canadian federal election: Ottawa (County of)
Party	Candidate	Votes
Liberal–Conservative	Alonzo Wright	acclaimed
Source: Canadian Elections Database

1872 Canadian federal election: Ottawa (City of)
Party	Candidate	Votes
Liberal–Conservative	Alonzo Wright	acclaimed
Source: Canadian Elections Database

1874 Canadian federal election: Ottawa (County of)
Party	Candidate	Votes
Liberal–Conservative	Alonzo Wright	2,569
Unknown	F. S. MacKay	716
Source: lop.parl.ca

1878 Canadian federal election: Ottawa (County of)
Party	Candidate	Votes
Liberal–Conservative	Alonzo Wright	3,025
Unknown	J. A. Cameron	1,385

1882 Canadian federal election: Ottawa (County of)
Party	Candidate	Votes
Liberal–Conservative	Alonzo Wright	acclaimed

1887 Canadian federal election: Ottawa (County of)
Party	Candidate	Votes
Liberal–Conservative	Alonzo Wright	2,630
Liberal	A. S. C. Papineau	1,784

Parliament of Canada
Preceded by None	Member of Parliament from Ottawa (County of); 1867–1891	Succeeded by Charles Ramsay Devlin
