= Fizalam-William Perras =

Canadian politician

Member of Parliament for Wright
- In office October 1925 – June 1936
- Preceded by: Romuald-Montézuma Gendron
- Succeeded by: Rodolphe Leduc

Personal details
- Born: 10 March 1876 Hull, Quebec, Canada
- Died: 28 June 1936 (aged 60) Ottawa, Ontario, Canada
- Party: Liberal
- Spouse(s): 1) Gertrude Grace m. 29 January 1902; 2) Patricia Elizabeth Grace
- Profession: lumber merchant

Fizalam-William Perras (10 March 1876 – 28 June 1936) was a Liberal party member of the House of Commons of Canada. He was born in Hull, Quebec, the son of F. Marcelin Perras and Anatalie Sabourin, and became a lumber merchant.

Perras attended the University of Ottawa. For 15 years, Perras was mayor of Gracefield, Quebec and was a warden of Hull County.

He was first elected to Parliament at the Wright riding in the 1925 general election then re-elected in 1926, 1930 and 1935. Perras died in Ottawa on 28 June 1936 from a short illness before completing his term in the 18th Canadian Parliament.
