= Antoine-Prosper Méthot =

Antoine-Prosper Méthot (1804 – July 7, 1871) was a Quebec notary and political figure.

He was born Antoine-Prosper Méthotte at Pointe-aux-Trembles, Lower Canada in 1804. Méthot studied at the Petit Séminaire de Québec, apprenticed as a notary, received his commission in 1829 and set up practice at Saint-Pierre-les-Becquets. He also served as postmaster there. He was elected to the Legislative Assembly of the Province of Canada for Nicolet in 1844. Méthot died at Saint-Pierre-les-Becquets in 1871.

His brother François-Xavier was also a member of the legislative assembly and his brother Louis was a member of the Lower Canada assembly.
