= Nicolet (federal electoral district) =

Former federal electoral district in Quebec, Canada

Coordinates: 46.24754°N 72.60641°W

Quebec electoral district

Defunct federal electoral district
- Legislature: House of Commons
- District created: 1867
- District abolished: 1933
- First contested: 1867
- Last contested: 1930

Nicolet (French pronunciation: [nikɔlɛ(t)]) was a federal electoral district in Quebec, Canada, that was represented in the House of Commons of Canada from 1867 to 1935.

It was created by the British North America Act, 1867 which preserved existing electoral districts in Lower Canada. It consisted of the County of Nicolet. From 1903 to 1924, it included the parishes of Ste. Brigitte, Ste. Eulalie, Ste. Perpétue and St. Samuel. It was abolished in 1933 when it was redistributed into Lotbinière and Nicolet—Yamaska ridings.

== Members of Parliament ==
This riding elected the following members of Parliament:

| Parliament | Years | Member | Party |
|---|---|---|---|
Nicolet
| 1st | 1867–1872 | Joseph Gaudet | Conservative |
| 2nd | 1872–1874 | Joseph Gaudet | Conservative |
| 3rd | 1874–1877 | Joseph Gaudet | Conservative |
| 3rd | 1877–1878 | François-Xavier-Ovide Méthot | Independent Conservative |
| 4th | 1878–1882 | François-Xavier-Ovide Méthot | Independent Conservative |
| 5th | 1882–1884 | François-Xavier-Ovide Méthot | Independent Conservative |
| 5th | 1884–1887 | Athanase Gaudet | Nationalist Conservative |
| 6th | 1887–1888 | Athanase Gaudet | Nationalist Conservative |
| 6th | 1888–1891 | Fabien Boisvert | Independent Conservative |
| 7th | 1891–1896 | Joseph-Hector Leduc | Liberal |
| 8th | 1896–1897 | Fabien Boisvert | Conservative |
| 8th | 1897–1900 | Joseph-Hector Leduc | Liberal |
| 9th | 1900–1904 | Georges Ball | Conservative |
| 10th | 1904–1906 | Rodolphe Lemieux | Liberal |
| 10th | 1906–1907 | Charles Ramsay Devlin | Liberal |
| 10th | 1907–1908 | Gustave-Adolphe-Narcisse Turcotte | Liberal |
| 11th | 1908–1911 | Gustave-Adolphe-Narcisse Turcotte | Liberal |
| 12th | 1911–1916 | Paul-Émile Lamarche | Conservative |
| 13th | 1917–1921 | Arthur Trahan | Liberal |
| 14th | 1921–1923 | Arthur Trahan | Liberal |
| 14th | 1923–1925 | Joseph-Félix Descôteaux | Liberal |
| 15th | 1925–1926 | Joseph-Félix Descôteaux | Liberal |
| 16th | 1926–1930 | Joseph-Félix Descôteaux | Liberal |
| 17th | 1930–1935 | Lucien Dubois | Liberal |
Riding dissolved into Lotbinière and Nicolet—Yamaska

== Election results ==
1867 Canadian federal election
| Party | Candidate | Votes |
|---|---|---|
| Conservative | Joseph Gaudet | 1,070 |
| Unknown | M. Rousseau | 499 |
| Eligible voters | | 2,253 |
Source: Canadian Parliamentary Guide, 1871

1872 Canadian federal election
| Party | Candidate | Votes |
|---|---|---|
| Conservative | Joseph Gaudet | 1,423 |
| Unknown | N. Trahan | 120 |
Source: Canadian Elections Database

1874 Canadian federal election
| Party | Candidate | Votes |
|---|---|---|
| Conservative | Joseph Gaudet | 1,290 |
| Unknown | G. David | 951 |
Source: lop.parl.ca

By-election: On Mr. Gaudet being appointed to the Legislative Council of Quebec, for Kennebec Division, 31 October 1877

By-election on 18 December 1877
| Party | Candidate | Votes |
| Independent Conservative | François-Xavier-Ovide Méthot | 1,387 |
| Liberal | Gustave-Adolphe-Narcisse Turcotte | 1,018 |

1878 Canadian federal election
| Party | Candidate | Votes |
|---|---|---|
| Independent Conservative | François-Xavier-Ovide Méthot | 1,759 |
| Liberal | Gustave-Adolphe-Narcisse Turcotte | 1,018 |

1882 Canadian federal election
| Party | Candidate | Votes |
|---|---|---|
| Independent Conservative | François-Xavier-Ovide Méthot | acclaimed |

By-election: On Mr. Méthot being appointed to the Legislative Council of Quebec, for La Vallière Division, 27 March 1884

By-election on 16 April 1884
| Party | Candidate | Votes |
| Nationalist Conservative | Athanase Gaudet | 1,535 |
| Unknown | D. E. Archambeault | 1,136 |

1887 Canadian federal election
| Party | Candidate | Votes |
|---|---|---|
| Nationalist Conservative | Athanase Gaudet | 1,957 |
| Liberal | Zéphirin Mailhot | 779 |

By-election: On Mr. Gaudet's death, 29 April 1888

By-election on 17 July 1888
| Party | Candidate | Votes |
| Independent Conservative | Fabien Boisvert | 1,582 |
| Unknown | Archambault | 1,469 |

1891 Canadian federal election
| Party | Candidate | Votes |
|---|---|---|
| Liberal | Joseph-Hector Leduc | 1,502 |
| Conservative | E. C. Prince | 1,501 |
| Liberal | C. E. Houde | 313 |

1896 Canadian federal election
| Party | Candidate | Votes |
|---|---|---|
| Conservative | Fabien Boisvert | 2,377 |
| Liberal | Joseph-Hector Leduc | 2,239 |

By-election: On Mr. Boisvert's death, 12 November 1897

By-election on 21 December 1897
| Party | Candidate | Votes |
| Liberal | Joseph-Hector Leduc | 2,265 |
| Conservative | J. U. Beauchesne | 2,018 |

1900 Canadian federal election
| Party | Candidate | Votes |
|---|---|---|
| Conservative | Georges Ball | 2,277 |
| Liberal | Charles Milot | 2,136 |

1904 Canadian federal election
| Party | Candidate | Votes |
|---|---|---|
| Liberal | Rodolphe Lemieux | 2,698 |
| Conservative | Georges Ball | 2,356 |

By-election: On Mr. Lemieux being elected to sit for Gaspé, 3 December 1906

By-election on 29 December 1906
| Party | Candidate | Votes |
| Liberal | Charles Ramsay Devlin | 2,721 |
| Conservative | Georges Ball | 2,328 |

By-election: On Mr. Devlin's resignation, 29 October 1907

By-election on 30 December 1907
| Party | Candidate | Votes |
| Liberal | Gustave-Adolphe-Narcisse Turcotte | 2,761 |
| Conservative | J. C. Héon | 2,340 |

1908 Canadian federal election
| Party | Candidate | Votes |
|---|---|---|
| Liberal | Gustave-Adolphe-Narcisse Turcotte | 2,718 |
| Conservative | Wilfrid Camirand | 2,052 |

1911 Canadian federal election
| Party | Candidate | Votes |
|---|---|---|
| Conservative | Paul-Émile Lamarche | 2,805 |
| Liberal | Gustave-Adolphe-Narcisse Turcotte | 2,721 |

1917 Canadian federal election
| Party | Candidate | Votes |
|---|---|---|
| Liberal | Arthur Trahan | acclaimed |

1921 Canadian federal election
| Party | Candidate | Votes |
|---|---|---|
| Liberal | Arthur Trahan | 8,298 |
| Progressive | Fortunat Proulx | 2,271 |

By-election: On Mr. Trahan's acceptance of an office of emolument under the Crown, 25-04-1923

By-election on 14 May 1923
| Party | Candidate | Votes |
| Liberal | Joseph-Félix Descôteaux | acclaimed |

1925 Canadian federal election
| Party | Candidate | Votes |
|---|---|---|
| Liberal | Joseph-Félix Descôteaux | 6,221 |
| Conservative | Joseph Lamarche | 2,972 |
| Independent Liberal | John O'Shaughnessy | 723 |

1926 Canadian federal election
| Party | Candidate | Votes |
|---|---|---|
| Liberal | Joseph-Félix Descôteaux | 6,597 |
| Conservative | Charles Bourgeois | 3,782 |

1930 Canadian federal election
| Party | Candidate | Votes |
|---|---|---|
| Liberal | Lucien Dubois | 6,303 |
| Conservative | Joseph-Alfred Gaudet | 5,102 |
Source: lop.parl.ca

== See also ==
- List of Canadian electoral districts
- Historical federal electoral districts of Canada
