= Louis-Trefflé Dorais =

Canadian politician

Member of the Legislative Assembly of Quebec for Nicolet
- In office 1883–1888
- Preceded by: Charles-Édouard Houde
- Succeeded by: Honoré Brunelle Tourigny

Personal details
- Born: March 19, 1835 Sainte-Martine, near Châteauguay, Lower Canada
- Died: January 2, 1907 (aged 71) Montreal, Quebec
- Resting place: Notre Dame des Neiges Cemetery
- Party: Independent

Louis-Trefflé Dorais (March 19, 1835 – January 2, 1907) was a merchant and political figure in Quebec. He represented Nicolet in the Legislative Assembly of Quebec from 1883 to 1888 as an independent conservative.

He was born in Sainte-Martine, Lower Canada, the son of Léon Dorais and Félicité Lamagdelaine, and was educated there. He was an exporter and dealer in hay. In 1856, he married Marie-Louise-Elmire Poisson. Dorais was postmaster at Warwick. In 1872, he moved to Saint-Grégoire. He ran unsuccessfully for a seat in the Quebec assembly in 1881, losing to Charles-Édouard Houde. After the election of Houde was overturned in 1883, Dorais defeated Houde in the by-election that followed. His election in 1886 was overturned by the Quebec Superior Court in 1888; he did not run in the by-election which followed. From 1888 to 1896, Dorais was director of public works for the federal government at Sorel. In 1896, he moved to Montreal; he died there at the age of 71 and was buried in the Notre Dame des Neiges Cemetery.

His daughter Corinne married Louis-Edmond Panneton. After his death in 1907, he was entombed at the Notre Dame des Neiges Cemetery in Montreal.
