= Ottawa (County of) (electoral district) =

Former federal electoral district in Quebec, Canada

Ottawa
Quebec electoral district

Defunct federal electoral district
- Legislature: House of Commons
- District created: 1867
- District abolished: 1892
- First contested: 1867
- Last contested: 1891

Ottawa (County of) (French: Ottawa (Compté d')) was a federal electoral district in Quebec in the House of Commons of Canada from 1867 to 1892. It was based in the Outaouais region of Quebec, across the Ottawa River from the city of Ottawa, Ontario.

The electoral district was created by the British North America Act, 1867, based on the former electoral district of Ottawa in the Legislative Assembly of the Province of Canada. The district was redistributed into the new electoral districts of Wright and Labelle in 1892.

== Members of the Legislative Assembly of Lower Canada ==
This riding elected the following members of the Legislative Assembly of Lower Canada:

- Philemon Wright (1830–1834)
- Theodore Davis (1832–1834) (second member added)
- James Blackburn & Baxter Bowman (1834–1838)

== Members of Parliament ==
This riding elected the following members of Parliament:

Parliament	Years	Member	Party
County of Ottawa
1st	1867–1872	Alonzo Wright	Liberal–Conservative
2nd	1872–1874	Alonzo Wright	Liberal–Conservative
3rd	1874–1878	Alonzo Wright	Liberal–Conservative
4th	1878–1882	Alonzo Wright	Liberal–Conservative
5th	1882–1887	Alonzo Wright	Liberal–Conservative
6th	1887–1891	Alonzo Wright	Liberal–Conservative
7th	1891–1896	Charles Ramsay Devlin	Liberal
Riding dissolved into Wright and Labelle

== Election results ==
1867 Canadian federal election
Party	Candidate	Votes
Liberal–Conservative	Alonzo Wright	acclaimed
Source: Canadian Elections Database

1872 Canadian federal election
Party	Candidate	Votes
Liberal–Conservative	Alonzo Wright	acclaimed
Source: Canadian Elections Database

1874 Canadian federal election
Party	Candidate	Votes
Liberal–Conservative	Alonzo Wright	2,569
Unknown	F. S. MacKay	716
Source: lop.parl.ca

1878 Canadian federal election
Party	Candidate	Votes
Liberal–Conservative	Alonzo Wright	3,025
Unknown	J. A. Cameron	1,385

1882 Canadian federal election
Party	Candidate	Votes
Liberal–Conservative	Alonzo Wright	acclaimed

1887 Canadian federal election
Party	Candidate	Votes
Liberal–Conservative	Alonzo Wright	2,630
Liberal	A. S. C. Papineau	1,784

1891 Canadian federal election
Party	Candidate	Votes
Liberal	Charles Ramsay Devlin	2,993
Conservative	J. M. McDougall	2,579

== See also ==
- List of Canadian electoral districts
- Historical federal electoral districts of Canada
