= Émery Fleury =

Canadian politician (1901-1975)

Member of the Legislative Assembly of Quebec for Nicolet
- In office 1936–1939
- Preceded by: Alexandre Gaudet
- Succeeded by: Henri-Napoléon Biron
- In office 1944–1952
- Preceded by: Henri-Napoléon Biron
- Succeeded by: Camille Roy

Personal details
- Born: February 10, 1901 Saint-Léonard-d'Aston, Quebec
- Died: October 16, 1975 (aged 74) Trois-Rivières, Quebec
- Party: Union Nationale

Émery Fleury (February 10, 1901 – October 16, 1975) was a Canadian politician and a three-term member of the Legislative Assembly of Quebec.

== Background ==
He was born on February 10, 1901, in Saint-Léonard-d'Aston, Centre-du-Québec and became a dairy farmer.

== Political career ==
Fleury ran as a Conservative candidate in the district of Nicolet in the 1935 election and lost. He won a seat to the Legislative Assembly of Quebec as a Union Nationale candidate in the 1936 election against Liberal candidate Alexandre Gaudet. Fleury was defeated by Liberal candidate Henri-Napoléon Biron in the 1939 election, but won back his seat in the 1944 election and was re-elected in the 1948 election. He did not run for re-election in the 1952 election.

== Retirement ==
From 1963 to 1970, Fleury was a municipal public servant in Trois-Rivières. He died on October 16, 1975.
