= Romuald Montézuma Gendron =

Canadian politician

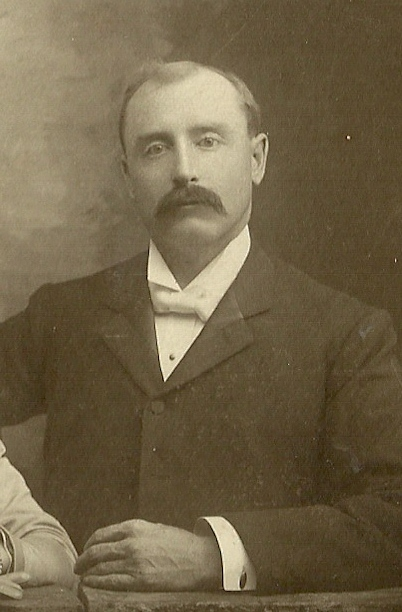

Member of Parliament for Wright
- In office December 1921 – September 1925
- Preceded by: Emmanuel Berchmans Devlin
- Succeeded by: Fizalam-William Perras

Personal details
- Born: Romuald Montézuma Gendron; 4 December 1865 Sault-Montmorency, Canada East
- Died: 26 October 1946 (aged 80) Ottawa, Ontario
- Party: Liberal
- Spouse: Corinne Joanis
- Profession: contractor, farmer

Romuald Montézuma Gendron (4 December 1865 – 26 October 1946) was a Liberal party member of the House of Commons of Canada. He was born in Sault-Montmorency, Canada East and became a contractor and farmer. He was the younger brother of Ferdinand-Ambroise Gendron, and his sister, Clara, married Simon Napoléon Parent.

The son of Ambroise Gendron Jr. and Esther Chamberland, he was educated in Quebec City and settled in Maniwaki. In 1899, Gendron married Corinne Joanis and had 3 children: Anne Marie, Joseph, and Simone. He was elected to Parliament at the Wright riding in the 1921 general election. After completing his only term, the 14th Canadian Parliament, Gendron left the House of Commons and did not seek another term in the 1925 election.

Gendron was also a Quebec Crown Lands agent from 1897 to 1921 and a Fish and Game warden from 1900 to 1921.
