= Honoré Brunelle Tourigny =

Canadian politician

Member of the Legislative Assembly of Quebec for Nicolet
- In office 1888–1890
- Preceded by: Louis-Trefflé Dorais
- Succeeded by: Joseph-Victor Monfette

Personal details
- Born: September 23, 1857 Gentilly, Canada East
- Died: September 25, 1918 (aged 61) Trois-Rivières, Quebec
- Party: Conservative

Honoré Brunelle Tourigny (September 23, 1857 – September 25, 1918) was a surveyor, engineer and political figure in Quebec. He represented Nicolet in the Legislative Assembly of Quebec from 1888 to 1890 as a Conservative.

He was born in Gentilly, Canada East, the son of Honoré Tourigny and Célina Brunelle, and was educated at the Collège de Nicolet, where he received a degree in civil engineering and surveying. Tourigny was surveyor for the town of Trois-Rivières and chief engineer for the St. Lawrence, Lower Laurentian and Saguenay Railway. In 1881, he married Lumina Legendre. He was elected to the Quebec assembly in an 1888 by-election held after the election of Louis-Trefflé Dorais was overturned by the courts and was defeated by Joseph-Victor Monfette when he ran for reelection in 1890. He died in Trois-Rivières at the age of 61.
