= Louis Méthot =

Canadian politician

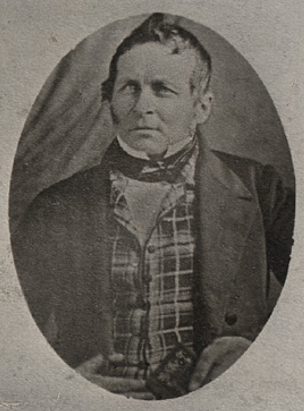
Louis Méthot

Louis Méthot (1793 – October 16, 1859) was a Quebec businessman and political figure.

He was born Louis Méthotte at Pointe-aux-Trembles, Lower Canada in 1793. Méthot was a merchant at Sainte-Croix. He served in the local militia during the War of 1812, becoming lieutenant. He was named justice of the peace. Méthot also served as commissioner for the construction of a bridge over the Chaudière River and a road in the region of Sainte-Croix. In 1830, he was elected to the Legislative Assembly of Lower Canada for Lotbinière, supporting the parti patriote, and was reelected in 1834. Méthot voted in support of the Ninety-Two Resolutions. In 1848, he was appointed to the Legislative Council of the Province of Canada; he was removed for non-attendance in 1857.

He died at Sainte-Croix in 1859.

His brothers François-Xavier and Antoine-Prosper were members of the legislative assembly for the Province of Canada.
