= Emmanuel Berchmans Devlin =

Canadian politician

Emmanuel Berchmans Devlin, BA, BCL, MA, KC
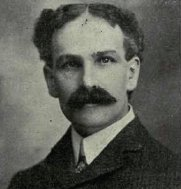

Member of the Canadian Parliament for Wright
- In office 1905–1921
- Preceded by: Wilfrid Laurier
- Succeeded by: Romuald Montézuma Gendron

Personal details
- Born: 24 December 1872 Aylmer, Quebec
- Died: 30 August 1921 (aged 48) Montreal, Quebec
- Party: Liberal
- Spouse(s): Cecile Masson, daughter of the Hon. L.R. Masson, former Lieutenant-Governor of Quebec
- Relations: Charles Ramsay Devlin, brother, Bernard Devlin, QC, MP, uncle
- Children: Eileen, Mary
- Education: Laval, McGill, Canisius College, Mount St. Mary's, College Sainte-Marie de Montreal
- Profession: Lawyer

Emmanuel Berchmans Devlin, KC (24 December 1872 – 30 August 1921) was a Canadian lawyer and politician.

Born in Aylmer, Quebec, the son of pioneer Aylmer mayor and merchant Charles Devlin (b. Meera, County Roscommon) and Hellen Roney (b. Stewarton, Scotland), and the last of nine children, Devlin was educated at the Collège Sainte-Marie in Montreal and Mount St Mary's College in Derbyshire, England. He received a Bachelor of Arts and a Bachelor of Laws degree from McGill University and a Master of Arts degree from Laval University in Quebec.

Called to the Quebec bar in 1895 and named King's Counsel in 1906; Devlin practised law in Montreal until 1901 when he moved to Hull. There, he became a partner in the law firm of Devlin and Ste. Marie, pleaded many notable cases, both civil and criminal in nature, and served as solicitor for Wright County.

Devlin was first elected to the House of Commons of Canada for the electoral district of Wright in a 1905 by-election called after Wilfrid Laurier resigned his seat in Wright, having been elected for Quebec East also. A Liberal, he was re-elected in 1908, 1911, and 1917. He died in office in 1921 in Montreal.

His elder brother, the Honourable Charles Ramsay Devlin, served not only as an MP in the Canadian House of Commons, but also as Minister of colonization, mines, and fisheries in the Quebec provincial government of Lomer Gouin, and as an MP representing Ireland in the British House of Commons at Westminster.

In 1907, Devlin married Cécile, the daughter of Louis-Rodrigue Masson, a former Lieutenant-Governor of Quebec.
