= François-Xavier Méthot =

Canadian politician (1796–1853)

François-Xavier Méthot (November 10, 1796 – November 6, 1853) was a Quebec businessman and political figure.

He was born François-Xavier Méthotte in Pointe-aux-Trembles, Lower Canada in 1796 and settled in the Lower Town of Quebec City, entering the wholesale and retail hardware business. He also set up factories to manufacture putty, cut nails and millstones. Méthot was named a justice of the peace, served on the city council and was a captain in the local militia. He also served as secretary for the Saint-Jean-Baptiste Society at Quebec City. Méthot was elected to the Legislative Assembly of the Province of Canada for Quebec City as a Reformer in an 1848 by-election. He also served as a director of the Quebec Provident and Savings Bank and was an office of Trinity House of Quebec.

He died at Quebec City in 1853.

His brother Antoine-Prosper Méthot also served in the legislative assembly and his brother Louis was a member of the Lower Canada assembly. His son François-Xavier was a member of the Quebec legislative assembly and the Canadian House of Commons.
