= Joseph Gaudet =

Canadian politician

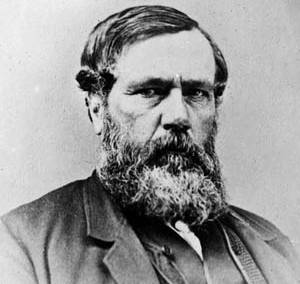

Member of the Canadian Parliament for Nicolet
- In office 1867–1877
- Succeeded by: François-Xavier-Ovide Méthot

Member of the Legislative Assembly of Quebec for Nicolet
- In office 1867–1871
- Succeeded by: François-Xavier-Ovide Méthot

Member of the Legislative Council of Quebec for Kennebec
- In office 1877–1882
- Preceded by: Louis Richard
- Succeeded by: Elzéar Gérin

Personal details
- Born: May 10, 1818 Gentilly, Lower Canada
- Died: August 4, 1882 (aged 64) Gentilly, Quebec
- Party: Conservative

Joseph Gaudet (May 10, 1818 – August 4, 1882) was a Quebec farmer and political figure. He represented Nicolet in the House of Commons of Canada as a Conservative Party of Canada member from 1867 to 1877. He represented Nicolet in the Legislative Assembly of Quebec from 1867 to 1871, and

He was born Joseph Godet in Gentilly, Lower Canada in 1818 and became a farmer in that region. He was elected to the Legislative Assembly of the Province of Canada for Nicolet in 1858; he was reelected in 1861 and 1863 as a member of the parti bleu. In 1867, he was elected to both the federal and provincial parliaments. He supported the Programme catholique, an election manifesto developed in 1871 with the support of bishop Ignace Bourget and Monsignor Louis-François Laflèche, which led to his support by the Catholic clergy in Quebec. In 1877, he was named to the Legislative Council of Quebec for Kennebec division and he served until his death in Gentilly in 1882.

His son Athanese also later represented Nicolet in the House of Commons.

1867 Canadian federal election: Nicolet
Party	Candidate	Votes
Conservative	Joseph Gaudet	1,070
Unknown	M. Rousseau	499
Eligible voters		2,253
Source: Canadian Parliamentary Guide, 1871

1872 Canadian federal election: Nicolet
Party	Candidate	Votes
Conservative	Joseph Gaudet	1,423
Unknown	N. Trahan	120
Source: Canadian Elections Database

1874 Canadian federal election: Nicolet
Party	Candidate	Votes
Conservative	Joseph Gaudet	1,290
Unknown	G. David	951
Source: lop.parl.ca
