= Camille Roy (politician) =

Canadian politician

Member of the Legislative Assembly of Quebec for Nicolet
- In office 1952–1962
- Preceded by: Émery Fleury ⋅
- Succeeded by: Germain Hébert

Personal details
- Born: July 13, 1911 Nicolet, Centre-du-Québec
- Died: March 29, 1969 (aged 57) Nicolet, Quebec
- Party: Union Nationale

Camille Roy (July 13, 1911, in Nicolet, Quebec – March 29, 1969, in Nicolet, Quebec) was a Canadian politician and a three-term Member of the Legislative Assembly of Quebec.

== Background ==
Roy was born on July 13, 1911, in Nicolet, Centre-du-Québec. He became a farmer.

== Political career ==
Roy ran as a Union Nationale candidate in the district of Nicolet in the 1952 election and won. He was re-elected in the 1956 and 1960 elections, but was defeated against Liberal candidate Germain Hébert in the 1962 election.

== Retirement ==
From 1966 to 1969, Roy was a staff member of Clément Vincent, who was a Member of the provincial legislature. He died on March 29, 1969.
