= Charles-Édouard Houde =

Canadian politician

Member of the Legislative Assembly of Quebec for Nicolet
- In office 1876–1883
- Preceded by: François-Xavier-Ovide Méthot
- Succeeded by: Louis-Trefflé Dorais

Personal details
- Born: December 18, 1823 Rivière-du-Loup-en-Haut (Louiseville), Lower Canada
- Died: November 23, 1912 (aged 88) Saint-Célestin, Quebec
- Party: Conservative

Charles-Édouard Houde (December 18, 1823 – November 23, 1912) was a merchant and political figure in Quebec. He represented Nicolet in the Legislative Assembly of Quebec from 1876 to 1883 as a Conservative.

He was born in Rivière-du-Loup-en-Haut, Lower Canada, the son of Joseph Houde and Rosalie Massé. He established himself in business first in Yamaska and later at Saint-Célestin. Houde was a general merchant, also selling lumber, paper and hay. In 1847, he married Léocadie Therrien. He served as a lands and forests officer, justice of the peace, postmaster and colonization officer. He was first elected to the Quebec assembly in an 1876 by-election held after the election of François-Xavier-Ovide Méthot was declared invalid. His election in 1881 was overturned in 1883 and he lost the by-election held later that year to Louis-Trefflé Dorais. He ran unsuccessfully as a nationalist candidate in 1886, losing again to Dorais. Houde was an unsuccessful candidate for a seat in the House of Commons running as an independent liberal in 1891.

Houde was secretary for Saint-Célestin from 1855 to 1865 and was mayor from 1864 to 1875 and again from 1885 to 1894. Houde also served as warden for Nicolet County and as mayor of Annaville from 1897 to 1912. He died in Saint-Célestin at the age of 88.
