= Charles Devlin (Canadian politician) =

Canadian merchant and politician (1827–1916)

Charles Devlin (1827 – March 9, 1916) was an Irish-born merchant and politician in Quebec. He was mayor of Aylmer from 1873 to 1878 and from 1890 to 1891.

He left Roscommon in 1851 and came to Aylmer, where he operated a general store. Devlin married Mary Ellen Roney. He served on Aylmer municipal council several times between 1860 and 1872 and from 1882 to 1889. During his term as mayor, the village of Aylmer became a city.

His sons Charles Ramsay and Emmanuel Berchmans later served in the Canadian House of Commons; Charles Ramsay also served in the Quebec assembly.

His former residence has been designated as a site of historic importance.
