= Alexandre Gaudet =

Canadian politician

Alexandre Gaudet (December 29, 1870 – January 20, 1961) was a Quebec merchant and politician. He represented Nicolet in the Legislative Assembly of Quebec from 1933 to 1936 as a Liberal.

The son of David Gaudet and Delphine Hébert, he was born in Sainte-Eulalie and was educated there. Gaudet worked on the family farm, established a general store at Sainte-Eulalie and then established the company Alexandre Gaudet Ltée, a wholesale business, at Aston-Jonction. Gaudet was a member of the Montreal Board of Trade. He served as mayor of Aston-Jonction from 1928 to 1937 and from 1941 to 1947 and as prefect for Nicolet County from 1930 to 1932.

In 1892, he married Flore Bourgeois. His daughter Françoise was a Quebec journalist.

He was first elected to the Quebec assembly in a by-election held November 7, 1933. Gaudet was reelected in 1935 and was defeated when he ran for reelection in 1936, losing to Émery Fleury of the Union Nationale.

He died at Aston-Jonction at the age of 90 and was buried there.
