= Joseph-Félix Descôteaux =

Canadian politician

Joseph-Félix Descôteaux (March 17, 1863 – July 13, 1931) was a farmer and political figure in Quebec. He represented Nicolet in the House of Commons of Canada from 1923 to 1930 as a Liberal member.

He was born in Sainte-Monique, Canada East, the son of Félix Descoteaux and Marie-Thérèse Manseau. He was educated at the commercial college in Sainte-Anne d'Yamachiche. Descôteaux was president of the agricultural society for Nicolet County and a director of the Société Coopérative de Québec. He was mayor of Sainte-Monique for six years. Descôteaux was married twice: to Parmélie Manseau in 1892 and Maria Denis in 1901.

== Electoral record ==
By-election on 14 May 1923
Party	Candidate	Votes
Liberal	Joseph-Félix Descôteaux	acclaimed

1925 Canadian federal election: Nicolet
Party	Candidate	Votes
Liberal	Joseph-Félix Descôteaux	6,221
Conservative	Joseph Lamarche	2,972
Independent Liberal	John O'Shaughnessy	723

1926 Canadian federal election: Nicolet
Party	Candidate	Votes
Liberal	Joseph-Félix Descôteaux	6,597
Conservative	Charles Bourgeois	3,782
