= Joseph-Hector Leduc =

Canadian politician

Joseph-Hector Leduc (1864 – February 22, 1901) was a merchant and political figure in Quebec. He represented Nicolet in the Canadian House of Commons from 1891 to 1896 and from 1897 to 1900 as a Liberal member.

He was born in Saint-Léonard, Canada East, the son of Hubert Leduc, and was educated at the Collège de Nicolet. In the 1891 federal election, after a recount, it was determined that he had defeated the Conservative candidate E.C. Prince by a single vote. Leduc was defeated by Fabien Boisvert when he ran for reelection in 1896, but was elected in an 1897 by-election held after Boisvert died in office.

1891 Canadian federal election: Nicolet
Party	Candidate	Votes
Liberal	Joseph-Hector Leduc	1,502
Conservative	E. C. Prince	1,501
Liberal	C. E. Houde	313

1896 Canadian federal election: Nicolet
Party	Candidate	Votes
Conservative	Fabien Boisvert	2,377
Liberal	Joseph-Hector Leduc	2,239

By-election: On Mr. Boisvert's death, 12 November 1897

By-election on 21 December 1897
Party	Candidate	Votes
Liberal	Joseph-Hector Leduc	2,265
Conservative	J. U. Beauchesne	2,018
