= Charles Ramsay Devlin =

Canadian politician

Sir Charles Ramsay Devlin
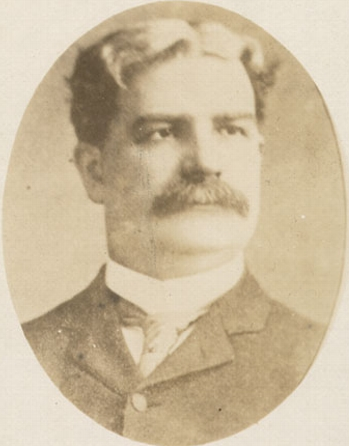

Member of the Canadian Parliament for Ottawa (County of)
- In office 1891–1896
- Preceded by: Alonzo Wright
- Succeeded by: District was abolished in 1892

Member of the Canadian Parliament for Wright
- In office 1896–1897
- Preceded by: Alonzo Wright
- Succeeded by: Louis Napoléon Champagne

Member of Parliament for Galway
- In office 1903–1906
- Preceded by: Arthur Alfred Lynch
- Succeeded by: Stephen Gwynn

Member of the Canadian Parliament for Nicolet
- In office 1906–1907
- Preceded by: Rodolphe Lemieux
- Succeeded by: Gustave-Adolphe-Narcisse Turcotte

Member of the Legislative Assembly of Quebec for Nicolet
- In office 1907–1912
- Preceded by: Alfred Marchildon
- Succeeded by: Arthur Trahan

Member of the Legislative Assembly of Quebec for Témiscamingue
- In office 1912–1914
- Preceded by: Riding created
- Succeeded by: Télesphore Simard

Personal details
- Born: 29 October 1858 Aylmer, Lower Canada
- Died: 1 March 1914 (aged 55) Aylmer, Quebec
- Party: Liberal
- Other political affiliations: Irish Parliamentary Party; Quebec Liberal Party
- Relations: Emmanuel Berchmans Devlin (son); Bernard Devlin (uncle)

Sir Charles Ramsay Devlin (29 October 1858 – 1 March 1914) was a Canadian politician who was a Member of Parliament (MP) in the House of Commons of Canada, in the Legislative Assembly of Quebec, and an Irish MP in the House of Commons of the United Kingdom of Great Britain and Ireland.

== Career ==
Born in Aylmer, Lower Canada, the son of Charles Devlin and Ellen Roney, his father was a merchant from Roscommon in Ireland. After attending the Petit Séminaire de Montréal from 1871 to 1877, he studied at the Université Laval in the faculty of arts from 1879 to 1881 but did not graduate. It is uncertain what his profession was before being elected as the Liberal candidate in 1891 to the House of Commons of Canada for the riding of Ottawa (County of) with the help of his friend Henri Bourassa. He was re-elected in 1896 for the riding of Wright. He resigned in 1897 and was appointed Canada's first trade commissioner in Ireland and served until 1902.

In 1902, against the advice of Canadian Prime Minister Sir Wilfrid Laurier, Devlin was elected by acclamation to the British House of Commons as the Irish Parliamentary Party candidate for Galway Borough. From 1903 to 1906, he was secretary general of the United Irish League. After being returned in the January 1906 general election he resigned later that year to return to Canada and was elected to the Canadian House of Commons from the riding of Nicolet. He resigned in 1907, after being appointed minister of colonization, mines, and fisheries in the cabinet of Quebec Premier Sir Lomer Gouin. He was elected to the Legislative Assembly of Quebec in a 1907 by-election in the riding of Nicolet and was re-elected in 1908 and 1912. He served until his death in 1914.

He was awarded honorary degrees from the Université Laval in 1908 and the University of Ottawa in 1910. His brother, Emmanuel Berchmans Devlin was also a member of the Canadian House of Commons.

1891 Canadian federal election: Ottawa (County of)
| Party | Candidate | Votes |
|---|---|---|
| Liberal | Charles Ramsay Devlin | 2,993 |
| Conservative | J. M. McDougall | 2,579 |

Parliament of the United Kingdom
| Preceded by Arthur Lynch | Member of Parliament for Galway Borough; 1903 – 1906 | Succeeded by Stephen Gwynn |
