= Louis Beaubien =

Canadian politician (1837–1915)

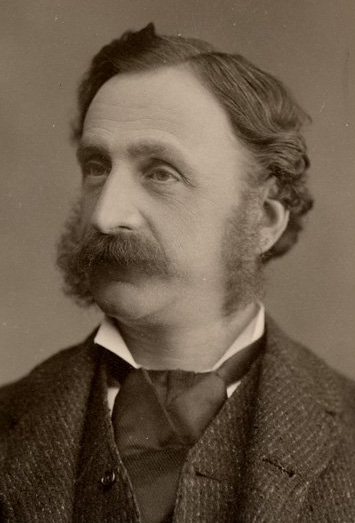

Member of the Legislative Assembly of Quebec for Hochelaga
- In office 1867–1886
- Succeeded by: Joseph-Octave Villeneuve

Member of the Legislative Assembly of Quebec for Nicolet
- In office 1892–1897
- Preceded by: Joseph-Victor Monfette
- Succeeded by: Georges Ball

Member of the Canadian Parliament for Hochelaga
- In office 1872–1874
- Preceded by: Antoine-Aimé Dorion
- Succeeded by: Alphonse Desjardins

Personal details
- Born: July 27, 1837 Montreal, Lower Canada
- Died: July 19, 1915 (aged 77) Outremont, Quebec
- Resting place: Notre Dame des Neiges Cemetery
- Party: Conservative
- Relations: Pierre Beaubien, father

Louis Beaubien (French pronunciation: [lwi bobjɛ̃]; July 27, 1837 – July 19, 1915) was a Canadian politician.

== Early life ==
Born in Montreal, Lower Canada, the son of Pierre Beaubien, a physician and politician, and Marie-Justine Casgrain, he was one of the founders of Outremont.

== Political career ==
In 1867, he was elected to the Legislative Assembly of Quebec in the riding of Hochelaga. He was also elected to the House of Commons of Canada as the Conservative candidate for the Quebec riding of Hochelaga in the 1872 federal election. He resigned once it was no longer allowed to hold both federal and provincial offices.

He was re-elected in 1875, 1878, and acclaimed in 1881. He was Speaker of the Legislative Assembly from 1876 to 1878. He did not run in the 1886 election. In 1891, he was named commissioner of agriculture and colonization in the cabinet of Charles Boucher de Boucherville.

Beaubien was acclaimed in the 1892 election. He would remain in this post in the cabinets of Louis-Olivier Taillon and Edmund James Flynn. He was defeated in the 1897 election.

== Personal life ==
In 1882, he was the 30th President of the Saint-Jean-Baptiste Society of Montreal. In 1864, he married Suzanne Lauretta Stuart. They had four sons and four daughters, including Charles-Philippe Beaubien, the Canadian senator.

He is the grandfather of Louis-Philippe Beaubien, also a Canadian senator. He was a cousin of Charles Eusèbe Casgrain and, his son, Philippe Baby Casgrain. Beaubien died in 1915 and is buried in the Notre Dame des Neiges Cemetery.

== Electoral history ==
1872 Canadian federal election: Hochelaga-Maisonneuve
Party	Candidate	Votes	%	±%
Conservative	Louis Beaubien	1,800	58.40	
Unknown	V. Hudon	1,282	41.60	
Total valid votes		3,082	100.00	
Source: Canadian Elections Database

== See also ==
- 1st Canadian Parliament
- 2nd Canadian Parliament
- 3rd Canadian Parliament
- 4th Canadian Parliament
- 5th Canadian Parliament
- 6th Canadian Parliament
- 7th Canadian Parliament
- 8th Canadian Parliament

Political offices
Preceded by Pierre-Étienne Fortin	Speaker of the Legislative Assembly of Quebec; 1876–1878	Succeeded by Arthur Turcotte
