= Louis-Philippe Beaubien =

Canadian politician

The Honourable Louis-Philippe Beaubien

Senator for Bedford, Quebec
- In office November 16, 1960 – March 28, 1985
- Appointed by: John Diefenbaker
- Preceded by: Jacob Nicol
- Succeeded by: Paul David

Personal details
- Born: March 3, 1903 Montreal, Quebec, Canada
- Died: March 28, 1985 (aged 82) Ottawa, Ontario, Canada
- Resting place: Notre Dame des Neiges Cemetery
- Party: Progressive Conservative
- Relations: Charles-Philippe Beaubien, father Louis Beaubien, grandfather

Louis-Philippe Beaubien (March 3, 1903 – March 28, 1985) was a Canadian politician.

Born in Montreal, Quebec, his father Charles-Philippe Beaubien was a Senator from 1919 to 1945 and his grandfather, Louis Beaubien, was a member of the National Assembly of Quebec and House of Commons of Canada.

He was a stockbroker and Progressive Conservative fund raiser before being summoned to the Senate in 1960 representing the senatorial division of Bedford, Quebec.

He died while in office in Ottawa, Ontario in 1985. He was entombed at the Notre Dame des Neiges Cemetery in Montreal.
