= Athanase Gaudet =

Canadian politician

Athanase Gaudet (June 20, 1848 – April 29, 1888) was a farmer, merchant and political figure in Quebec, Canada. He represented Nicolet in the House of Commons of Canada from 1884 to 1888 as a Nationalist Conservative member.

He was born in Gentilly, Canada East, the son of Joseph Gaudet and Deneige Levasseur, and was educated at the Séminaire de Nicolet. In 1887, he married Sara Poissin. He was elected to the House of Commons in an 1884 by-election held after François-Xavier-Ovide Méthot was named to the Quebec Legislative Council. Gaudet died in office at the age of 39. Gaudet also served as mayor of Gentilly from 1882 to 1888 and was a captain in the militia.

== Electoral results ==
By-election on 16 April 1884
Party	Candidate	Votes
Nationalist Conservative	Athanase Gaudet	1,535
Unknown	D. E. Archambeault	1,136

1887 Canadian federal election: Nicolet
Party	Candidate	Votes
Nationalist Conservative	Athanase Gaudet	1,957
Liberal	Zéphirin Mailhot	779
