= 1904 Canadian federal election =

- November 3, 1904

214 seats in the House of Commons 108 seats needed for a majority
- Turnout: 71.6% (▼5.8 pp)
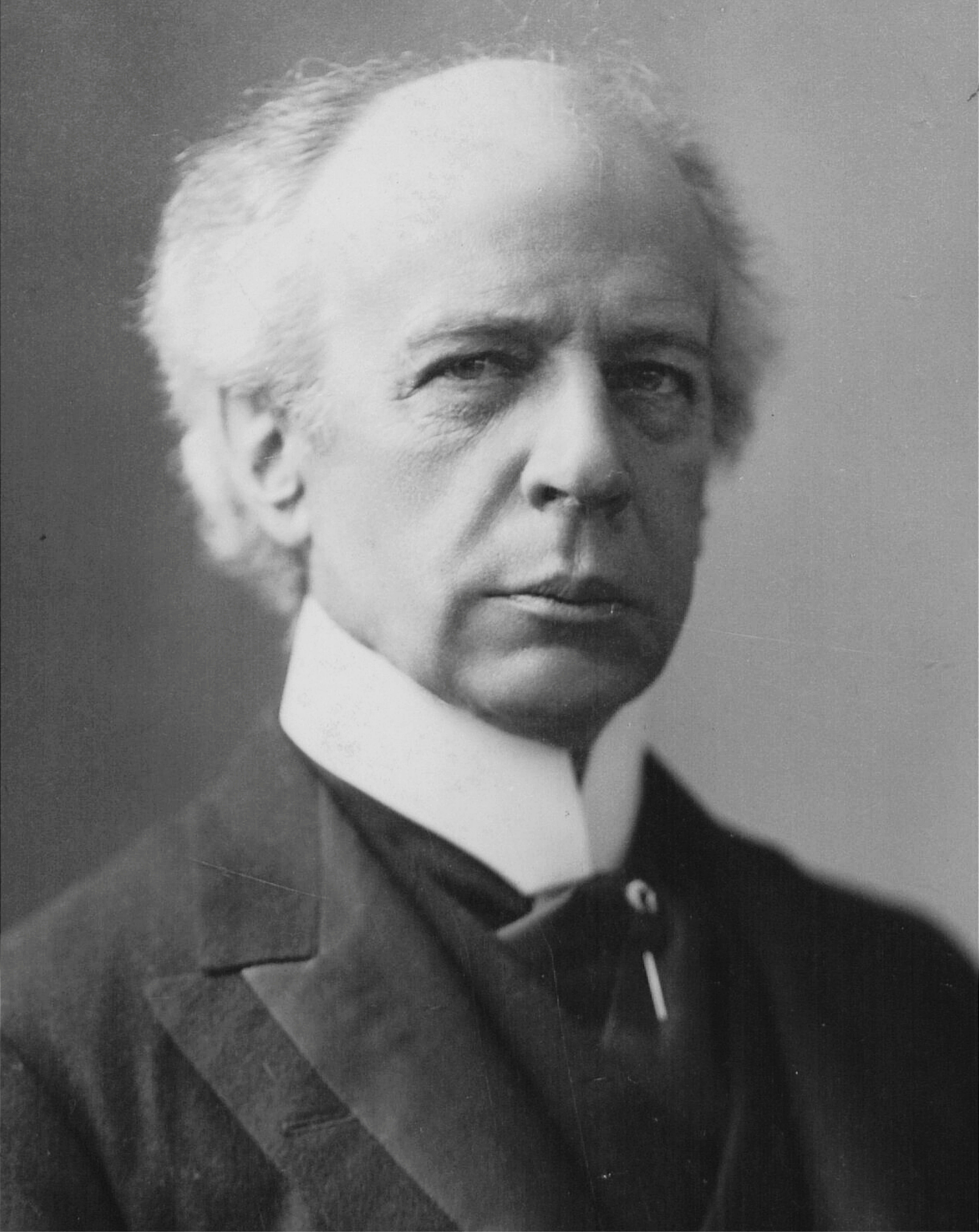

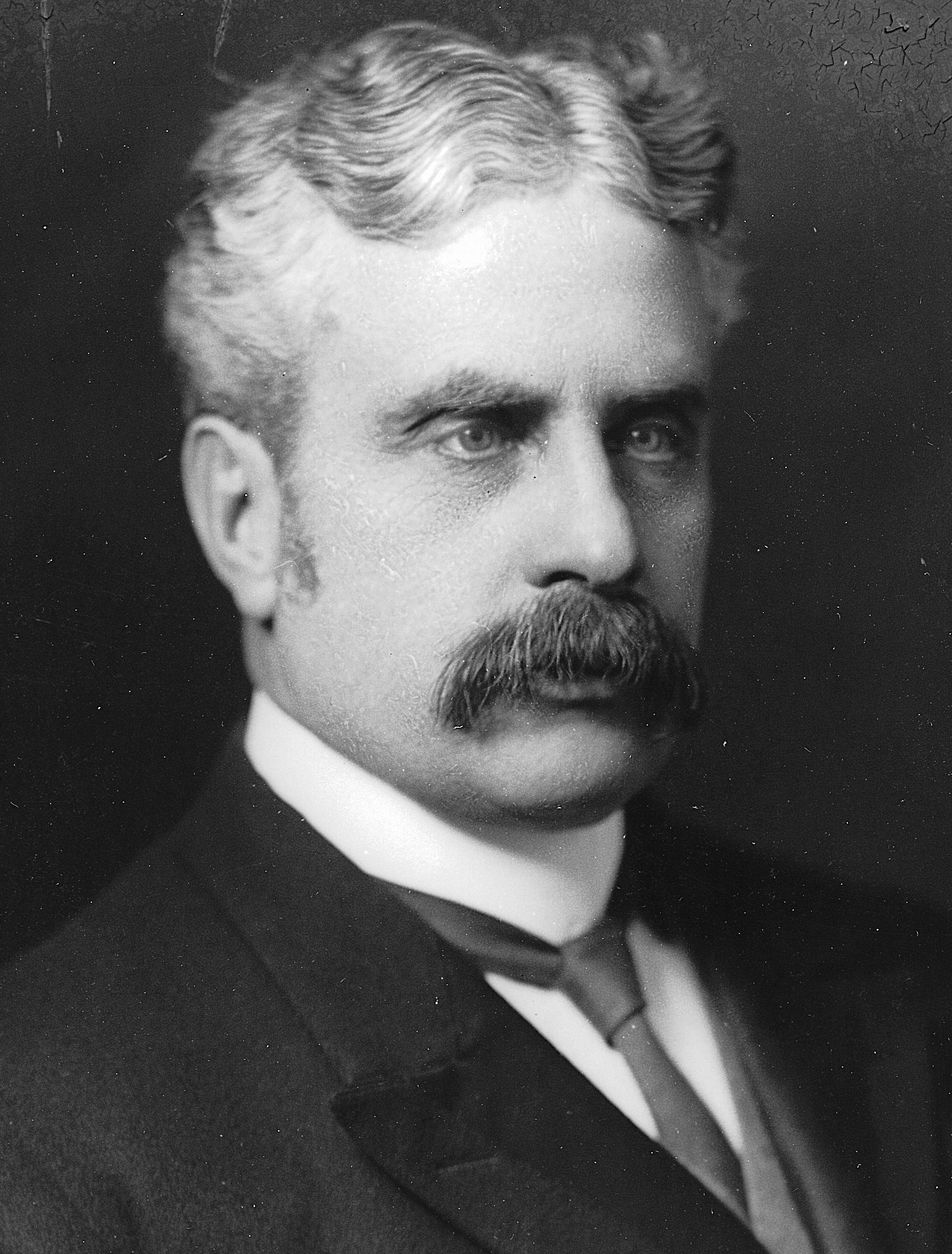
	First party	Second party
Leader	Wilfrid Laurier	Robert Borden
Party	Liberal	Conservative
Leader since	June 2, 1887	February 6, 1901
Leader's seat	Quebec East (Note: Laurier was also elected in Wright; he chose to sit for Quebec East instead, and resigned as the Member of Parliament for Wright.)	Halifax (lost re-election)
Last election	128 seats, 50.3%	79 seats, 46.1%
Seats won	137	75
Seat change	▲9	▼4
Popular vote	521,041	470,430
Percentage	50.9%	45.9%
Swing	▲0.6 pp	▼0.2 pp

- The Canadian parliament after the 1904 election
Prime Minister before election
Wilfrid Laurier
Liberal
Prime Minister after election
Wilfrid Laurier
Liberal

The 1904 Canadian federal election was held on November 3, 1904, to elect members of the House of Commons of Canada of the 10th Parliament of Canada. Prime Minister Sir Wilfrid Laurier led the Liberal Party of Canada to a third term in government, with an increased majority, and over half of the popular vote.

Sir Robert Borden's Conservatives and Liberal-Conservatives were unable to challenge the Liberals effectively, and lost a small portion of their popular vote, along with four seats, including his own. Borden re-entered parliament the next year in a by-election.

This was the last election until 1949 in which the Northwest Territories was to have representation in the House of Commons.

During the term of this parliament, most of the settled region of the western prairies was hived off the NWT as the provinces of Alberta and Saskatchewan on 1 September 1905. The NWT MPs in what had become Alberta - representing Edmonton, Strathcona, Calgary and Medicine Hat - continued to sit as representatives of their old NWT ridings until the 10th Parliament's dissolution in 1908.

One of the key issues in the election was Imperial Preference.

== National results ==

Party	Party leader	# of candidates	Seats			Popular vote		
Party	Party leader	# of candidates	1900	Elected	Change	#	%	Change
Liberal	Wilfrid Laurier	208	128	137	+7.0%	521,041	50.88%	+0.63pp
Conservative	Robert Borden	199	69	70	+1.4%	454,693	44.40%	+1.18pp
Liberal-Conservative	Robert Borden	6	10	5	-50.0%	15,737	1.54%	-1.34pp
Independent		6	3	1	-66.7%	10,205	1.00%	-0.40pp
Independent Conservative		2	1	1	-	5,039	0.49%	-0.57pp
Unknown		13	-	-	-	11,659	1.14%	+1.14pp
Labour		2	-	-	-	2,159	0.21%	-0.10pp
Socialist		3	*	-	*	1,794	0.18%	*
Nationalist		1	*	-	*	1,429	0.14%	*
Independent Liberal		3	1	-	-100%	309	0.03%	-0.48pp
Total		443	213	214	+0.5%	1,024,065	100%	
Sources: http://www.elections.ca -- History of Federal Ridings since 1867

Note:

* Party did not nominate candidates in the previous election.

== Results by province ==
Party		BC	NWT	MB	ON	QC	NB	NS	PE	YK	Total
Liberal	Seats:	7	7	7	37	53	7	18	1	-	137
Liberal	Popular Vote (%):	49.5	58.4	49.7	47.5	55.1	51.0	52.9	49.1	41.4	50.9
Conservative	Seats:	-	2	3	44	12	5	-	3	1	70
Conservative	Vote (%):	38.8	37.8	41.8	46.3	43.0	42.0	44.5	50.9	58.6	44.4
Liberal-Conservative	Seats:		1		3		1				5
Liberal-Conservative	Vote (%):		3.8		2.1		6.8				1.5
Independent	Seats:		-	-	1	-		-			1
Independent	Vote (%):		xx	5.8	0.6	1.3		1.6			1.0
Independent Conservative	Seats:				1						1
Independent Conservative	Vote (%):				1.2						0.5
Total seats		7	10	10	86	65	13	18	4	1	214
Parties that won no seats:
Unknown	Vote (%):	4.6			2.4	xx					1.1
Labour	Vote (%):			2.7	0.7			0.8			0.2
Socialist	Vote (%):	7.1									0.2
Nationalist	Vote (%):					0.6					0.5
Independent Liberal	Vote (%):				xx		0.2	0.1			xx

xx - indicates less than 0.05% of the popular vote.

== See also ==
- List of Canadian federal general elections
- List of political parties in Canada
- 10th Canadian Parliament
