= Paul-Émile Lamarche =

Canadian politician (1881–1918)

Paul-Émile Lamarche (21 December 1881 – 11 October 1918) was a Canadian lawyer and political figure in Quebec. He represented Nicolet in the House of Commons of Canada from 1911 to 1916 as a Conservative.

He was born in Montreal, the son of Azarie Lamarche and Julia Paquette, and educated at the Petit Séminaire Saint-Sulpice, the Collège Sainte-Marie de Montréal and the Université Laval. He articled in law with Thomas Chase Casgrain and set up practice in Montreal. Lamarche found himself in opposition to the Conservative party in the House of Commons on the issue of French language instruction in Ontario and bilingual instruction in Manitoba. He resigned his seat in the House of Commons in 1916, having served for 5 years and 2 days. Lamarche died two years later at the age of 36.
