= 29th Quebec Legislature =

Provincial legislature in Quebec, Canada, from 1970 to 1973

The 29th National Assembly of Quebec was the provincial legislature in Quebec, Canada that was elected in the 1970 Quebec general election. It sat for four sessions, from 9 June 1970 to 19 December 1970; from 23 February 1971 to 24 December 1971; from 7 March 1972 to 14 March 1973; and from 15 March 1973 to 25 September 1973. The governing Quebec Liberal Party was led by Premier Robert Bourassa; the official opposition Union Nationale was led by Jean-Jacques Bertrand and later by Gabriel Loubier. The events of the October Crisis took place during this mandate.

== Seats per political party ==
- After the 1970 elections

Affiliation	Members
Parti libéral du Québec	72
Union Nationale	17
Ralliement créditiste du Québec	12
Parti Québécois	7
Total	108
Government Majority	55

== Member list ==
This was the list of members of the National Assembly of Quebec that were elected in the 1970 election:

Name	Party	Riding	First elected / previously elected	No. of terms
Ronald Tétreault	Ralliement créditiste	Abitibi-Est	1970	1st term
Aurèle Audet	Ralliement créditiste	Abitibi-Ouest	1970	1st term
Aurèle Audet	Independent	Abitibi-Ouest	1970	1st term
Aurèle Audet	Ralliement créditiste	Abitibi-Ouest	1970	1st term
François Cloutier	Libéral	Ahuntsic	1970	1st term
Zoel Saindon	Libéral	Argenteuil	1966	2nd term
Gilles Massé	Libéral	Arthabaska	1970	1st term
Jean-Guy Cardinal	Union Nationale	Bagot	1968	2nd term
Fabien Roy	Ralliement créditiste	Beauce	1970	1st term
Gérard Cadieux	Libéral	Beauharnois	1962	3rd term
Gabriel Loubier	Union Nationale	Bellechasse	1962	3rd term
Guy Gauthier	Union Nationale	Berthier	1966	2nd term
Gérard D. Levesque	Libéral	Bonaventure	1956	5th term
Georges-Émery Tremblay	Libéral	Bourassa	1966	2nd term
Camille Laurin	Parti Québécois	Bourget	1970	1st term
Glendon Brown	Libéral	Brome	1956	5th term
Pierre Laporte	Libéral	Chambly	1961	4th term
Jean Cournoyer (1971)	Libéral	Chambly	1969, (Note: Saint-Jacques (First elected as a Union Nationale)) 1971	2nd term*
Normand Toupin	Libéral	Champlain	1970	1st term
Raymond Mailloux	Libéral	Charlevoix	1962	3rd term
George Kennedy	Libéral	Châteauguay	1962	3rd term
André Harvey	Libéral	Chauveau	1970	1st term
Jean-Noël Tremblay	Union Nationale	Chicoutimi	1966	2nd term
Omer Dionne	Libéral	Compton	1970	1st term
Victor Goldbloom	Libéral	D'Arcy-McGee	1966	2nd term
Jean-Paul L'Allier	Libéral	Deux-Montagnes	1970	1st term
Florian Guay	Ralliement créditiste	Dorchester	1970	1st term
Alfred Bossé	Libéral	Dorion	1970	1st term
Bernard Pinard	Libéral	Drummond	1952, 1960	5th term*
Roch Boivin	Union Nationale	Dubuc	1966	2nd term
Henri-Laurier Coiteux	Libéral	Duplessis	1960	4th term
Donald Gallienne (1972)	Libéral	Duplessis	1972	1st term
Gilles Houde	Libéral	Fabre	1966	2nd term
Paul-André Latulippe	Ralliement créditiste	Frontenac	1970	1st term
François Gagnon	Union Nationale	Gaspé-Nord	1962	3rd term
Guy Fortier	Libéral	Gaspé-Sud	1962	3rd term
Roy Fournier	Libéral	Gatineau	1962	3rd term
Michel Gratton (1972)	Libéral	Gatineau	1972	1st term
Guy Joron	Parti Québécois	Gouin	1970	1st term
Oswald Parent	Libéral	Hull	1956	5th term
Kenneth Fraser	Libéral	Huntingdon	1966	2nd term
Alfred Croisetière	Union Nationale	Iberville	1966	2nd term
Louis-Philippe Lacroix	Libéral	Îles-de-la-Madeleine	1962	3rd term
Noël Saint-Germain	Libéral	Jacques-Cartier	1966	2nd term
Aimé Brisson	Libéral	Jeanne-Mance	1962	3rd term
Raymond Garneau	Libéral	Jean-Talon	1970	1st term
Robert Quenneville	Libéral	Joliette	1970	1st term
Gérald Harvey	Libéral	Jonquière	1960	4th term
Jean-Marie Pelletier	Libéral	Kamouraska	1970	1st term
Fernand Lafontaine	Union Nationale	Labelle	1959	5th term
Roger Pilote	Libéral	Lac-Saint-Jean	1970	1st term
Marcel Léger	Parti Québécois	LaFontaine	1970	1st term
Jean Perreault	Libéral	L'Assomption	1970	1st term
André Marchand	Libéral	Laurier	1970	1st term
Jean-Noël Lavoie	Libéral	Laval	1960	4th term
Prudent Carpentier	Libéral	Laviolette	1970	1st term
Joseph-Aurélien Roy	Ralliement créditiste	Lévis	1970	1st term
Fernand Houde	Libéral	Limoilou	1970	1st term
Julien Giasson	Libéral	L'Islet	1970	1st term
Jean-Louis Béland	Ralliement créditiste	Lotbinière	1970	1st term
Claude Castonguay	Libéral	Louis-Hébert	1970	1st term
Robert Burns	Parti Québécois	Maisonneuve	1970	1st term
Marie-Claire Kirkland	Libéral	Marguerite-Bourgeoys	1961	4th term
Rémi Paul	Union Nationale	Maskinongé	1966	2nd term
Jean Bienvenue	Libéral	Matane	1966	2nd term
Bona Arsenault	Libéral	Matapédia	1960	4th term
Bernard Dumont	Ralliement créditiste	Mégantic	1970	1st term
Bernard Dumont	Independent	Mégantic	1970	1st term
Bernard Dumont	Ralliement créditiste	Mégantic	1970	1st term
Robert Bourassa	Libéral	Mercier	1966	2nd term
Jean-Jacques Bertrand	Union Nationale	Missisquoi	1948	7th term
Marcel Masse	Union Nationale	Montcalm	1966	2nd term
Marcel Masse	Independent	Montcalm	1966	2nd term
Jean-Paul Cloutier	Union Nationale	Montmagny	1962	3rd term
Louis Vézina	Libéral	Montmorency	1970	1st term
Paul Berthiaume	Libéral	Napierville-Laprairie	1970	1st term
Clément Vincent	Union Nationale	Nicolet	1966	2nd term
William Tetley	Libéral	Notre-Dame-de-Grâce	1968	2nd term
Fernand Picard	Libéral	Olier	1966	2nd term
Jérôme Choquette	Libéral	Outremont	1966	2nd term
Mark Assad	Libéral	Papineau	1970	1st term
Jean-Guy Larivière	Libéral	Pontiac	1970	1st term
Antoine Drolet	Ralliement créditiste	Portneuf	1970	1st term
Claude Simard	Libéral	Richelieu	1970	1st term
Yvon Brochu	Ralliement créditiste	Richmond	1970	1st term
Maurice Tessier	Libéral	Rimouski	1966	2nd term
Paul Lafrance	Libéral	Rivière-du-Loup	1970	1st term
Arthur-Ewen Séguin	Libéral	Robert-Baldwin	1966	2nd term
Robert Lamontagne	Libéral	Roberval	1970	1st term
Marcel Ostiguy	Libéral	Rouville	1970	1st term
Camil Samson	Ralliement créditiste	Rouyn-Noranda	1970	1st term
Camil Samson	Independent	Rouyn-Noranda	1970	1st term
Camil Samson	Ralliement créditiste	Rouyn-Noranda	1970	1st term
Lucien Lessard	Parti Québécois	Saguenay	1970	1st term
Georges Springate	Libéral	Saint-Anne	1970	1st term
Charles-Henri Tremblay	Parti Québécois	Sainte-Marie	1970	1st term
Gérard Shanks	Libéral	Saint-Henri	1970	1st term
Fernand Cornellier	Libéral	Saint-Hyacinthe	1970	1st term
Claude Charron	Parti Québécois	Saint-Jacques	1970	1st term
Jacques Veilleux	Libéral	Saint-Jean	1970	1st term
Léo Pearson	Libéral	Saint-Laurent	1966	2nd term
Harry Blank	Libéral	Saint-Louis	1960	4th term
Philippe Demers	Union Nationale	Saint-Maurice	1966	2nd term
Armand Bois	Ralliement créditiste	Saint-Sauveur	1970	1st term
Armand Bois	Independent	Saint-Sauveur	1970	1st term
Armand Bois	Ralliement créditiste	Saint-Sauveur	1970	1st term
Armand Russell	Union Nationale	Shefford	1956	5th term
Jean-Paul Pépin	Libéral	Sherbrooke	1970	1st term
Georges Vaillancourt	Libéral	Stanstead	1960	4th term
Guy Leduc	Libéral	Taillon	1966	2nd term
Gilbert-Roland Théberge	Libéral	Témiscamingue	1962	3rd term
Montcalm Simard	Union Nationale	Témiscouata	1966	2nd term
Denis Hardy	Libéral	Terrebonne	1965, 1970	2nd term*
Guy Bacon	Libéral	Trois-Rivières	1970	1st term
Paul Phaneuf	Libéral	Vaudreuil-Soulanges	1970	1st term
Guy Saint-Pierre	Libéral	Verchères	1970	1st term
Lucien Caron	Libéral	Verdun	1970	1st term
Thomas Kevin Drummond	Libéral	Westmount	1970	1st term
René Lavoie	Union Nationale	Wolfe	1962	3rd term
Benjamin Faucher	Libéral	Yamaska	1970	1st term

== Other elected MNAs ==
Other MNAs were elected during this mandate in by-elections

- Jean Cournoyer, Quebec Liberal Party, Chambly, February 8, 1971
- Donald Gallienne, Quebec Liberal Party, Duplessis, October 11, 1972
- Michel Gratton, Quebec Liberal Party, Gatineau, November 15, 1972

== Cabinet Ministers ==
- Prime Minister and Executive Council President: Robert Bourassa
- Deputy Premier: Gérard D. Levesque
- Agriculture and Colonization: Normand Toupin
- Labour and Workforce: Pierre Laporte (1970), Jean Cournoyer (1970–1973)
- Public Works: Maurice Tessier (1970, 1973), Bernard Pinard (1970–1973)
  - Public Works and Provisioning: Maurice Tessier (1973)
- Public Office: Raymond Garneau (1970), Jean-Paul L'Allier (1970–1972), Jean Cournoyer (1972–1973), Oswald Parent (1973)
- Cultural Affairs: François Cloutier (1970–1972), Marie-Claire Kirkland (1972–1973)
- Immigration: Pierre Laporte (1970), François Cloutier (1970–1972), Jean Bienvenue (1972–1973)
- Health, Family and Social Welfare: Claude Castonguay (1970)
  - Social Affairs: Claude Castonguay (1970–1973)
- Education: Guy Saint-Pierre (1970–1972), François Cloutier (1972–1973)
- Lands and Forests: Thomas Kevin Drummond
- Tourism, Hunting and Fishing: Marie-Claire Kirkland (1970–1972), Guy Saint-Pierre (1972), Claude Simard (1972–1973)
- Natural Resources: Jean-Gilles Massé
- Roads: Bernard Pinard (1970–1973)
- Transportation: Georges-Emery Tremblay (1970–1971), Bernard Pinard (1971–1973)
- Communications: Jean-Paul L'Allier
- Municipal Affairs: Maurice Tessier (1970–1973), Victor Goldbloom (1973)
- Intergovernmental Affairs: Gérard D. Levesque (1970–1971, 1972–1973), Robert Bourassa (1971–1972)
- Industry and Commerce:Gérard D. Levesque (1970–1972), Guy Saint-Pierre (1972–1973)
- Financial Institutions, Companies and Cooperatives: Jérôme Choquette (1970), William Tetley (1970–1973)
- Justice: Jérôme Choquette
- Solicitor General: Roy Fournier (1971–1972)
- Finances: Robert Bourassa (1970), Raymond Garneau (1970–1973)
- President of the Treasury Board: Raymond Garneau (1971–1973)
- Revenu: William Tetley (1970), Gérald Harvey (1970–1973)
- State Ministers: Oswald Parent (1970–1973), Raymond Mailloux (1972–1973), Georges-Emery Tremblay (1971–1973), Claude Simard (1970–1972), Victor Goldbloom (1970–1973), Gérald Harvey (1970), Paul Phaneuf (1973), Robert Quenneville, Roy Fournier (1970–1971), Jean Bienvenue (1971–1972)

== New electoral districts ==
A major electoral reform took place in 1972 in which several ridings were merged or split. The changes were effective for the 1973 elections.

- Anjou was created from parts of LaFontaine
- Dorchester was renamed Beauce-Nord
- Beauce was renamed Beauce-Sud
- Brome and Missiquoi were merged to form Brome-Missisquoi.
- Charlesbourg was created from parts of Chauveau.
- Ahuntsic was renamed Crémazie.
- The old Frontenac riding was split. A new, unrelated Frontenac was created from the renaming and partial merger of Mégantic.
- Gaspé, which had been previously split into Gaspé-Nord and Gaspé-Sud, returned as a reunited single riding.
- Bagot was renamed Johnson
- Joliette and Montcalm merged to form Joliette-Montcalm
- L'Acadie was created from parts of Saint-Laurent and Ahuntsic.
- Kamouraska and Témiscouata were merged to form Kamouraska-Témiscouata.
- Montmagny and L'Islet were merged to form Montmagny-L'Islet.
- Parts of Mégantic and all of Compton were merged to form Mégantic-Compton.
- Napierville-Laprairie was renamed La Prairie.
- Mille-Iles was created from parts of Fabre.
- Mont-Royal was created from parts of Outremont.
- Nicolet and Yamaska were merged to form Nicolet-Yamaska.
- Pointe-Claire was formed from parts of Jacques-Cartier and Robert-Baldwin.
- Prévost was created from parts of Terrebonne.
- Rosemont was created from parts of Jeanne-Mance.
- Sauvé was created from parts of Bourassa.
- Taschereau was created from parts of Jean-Talon.
- Labelle was renamed Laurentides-Labelle.
- Laporte was formed from parts of Taillon
