= 28th Quebec Legislature =

The 28th Legislative Assembly of Quebec / 28th National Assembly of Quebec was the provincial legislature in Quebec, Canada that was elected in the 1966 Quebec general election. The name change from Legislative Assembly of Quebec to National Assembly of Quebec came into effect on December 31, 1968. The assembly sat for five sessions, from 1 December 1966 to 12 August 1967; on 20 October 1967 (one day); from 20 February 1968 to 18 December 1968; from 25 February 1969 to 23 December 1969; and from 24 February 1970 to 12 March 1970. The Union Nationale government was led by Daniel Johnson until his death in office, and then by Jean-Jacques Bertrand. The Liberal opposition was led by Jean Lesage and then by Robert Bourassa.

== Seats per political party ==
- After the 1966 elections

Affiliation	Members
Union Nationale	56
Liberal	50
Independent	2
Total	108
Government Majority	6

== Member list ==
This was the list of members of the National Assembly of Quebec that were elected in the 1966 election:

Name	Party	Riding	First elected / previously elected	No. of terms
Lucien Cliche	Liberal	Abitibi-Est	1960	3rd term
Alcide Courcy	Liberal	Abitibi-Ouest	1956	4th term
Jean-Paul Lefebvre	Liberal	Ahuntsic	1966	1st term
Zoel Saindon	Liberal	Argenteuil	1966	1st term
Roch Gardner	Union Nationale	Arthabaska	1966	1st term
Daniel Johnson	Union Nationale	Bagot	1946	7th term
Jean-Guy Cardinal (1968)	Union Nationale	Bagot	1968	1st term
Paul-Émile Allard	Union Nationale	Beauce	1962	2nd term
Gérard Cadieux	Liberal	Beauharnois	1962	2nd term
Gabriel Loubier	Union Nationale	Bellechasse	1962	2nd term
Guy Gauthier	Union Nationale	Berthier	1966	1st term
Gérard D. Levesque	Liberal	Bonaventure	1956	4th term
Georges-Émery Tremblay	Liberal	Bourassa	1966	1st term
Paul-Émile Sauvageau	Union Nationale	Bourget	1966	1st term
Glendon Brown	Liberal	Brome	1956	4th term
Pierre Laporte	Liberal	Chambly	1961	3rd term
Maurice Bellemare	Union Nationale	Champlain	1944	7th term
Raymond Mailloux	Liberal	Charlevoix	1962	2nd term
George Kennedy	Liberal	Châteauguay	1962	2nd term
François-Eugène Mathieu	Union Nationale	Chauveau	1966	1st term
Jean-Noël Tremblay	Union Nationale	Chicoutimi	1966	1st term
Claude-Gilles Gosselin	Union Nationale	Compton	1957	4th term
Victor Goldbloom	Liberal	D'Arcy-McGee	1966	1st term
Gaston Binette	Liberal	Deux-Montagnes	1960	3rd term
Paul-Henri Picard	Union Nationale	Dorchester	1966	1st term
François Aquin	Liberal	Dorion	1966	1st term
François Aquin	Independent	Dorion	1966	1st term
Mario Beaulieu (1969)	Union Nationale	Dorion	1969	1st term
Bernard Pinard	Liberal	Drummond	1952, 1960	4th term*
Roch Boivin	Union Nationale	Dubuc	1966	1st term
Henri-Laurier Coiteux	Liberal	Duplessis	1960	3rd term
Gilles Houde	Liberal	Fabre	1966	1st term
Fernand Grenier	Union Nationale	Frontenac	1966	1st term
François Gagnon	Union Nationale	Gaspé-Nord	1962	2nd term
Guy Fortier	Liberal	Gaspé-Sud	1962	2nd term
Roy Fournier	Liberal	Gatineau	1962	2nd term
Yves Michaud	Liberal	Gouin	1966	1st term
Yves Michaud	Independent Liberal	Gouin	1966	1st term
Oswald Parent	Liberal	Hull	1956	4th term
Kenneth Fraser	Liberal	Huntingdon	1966	1st term
Alfred Croisetière	Union Nationale	Iberville	1966	1st term
Louis-Philippe Lacroix	Liberal	Îles-de-la-Madeleine	1962	2nd term
Noël Saint-Germain	Liberal	Jacques-Cartier	1966	1st term
Aimé Brisson	Liberal	Jeanne-Mance	1962	2nd term
Henri Beaupré	Liberal	Jean-Talon	1962	2nd term
Pierre Roy	Union Nationale	Joliette	1966	1st term
Gérald Harvey	Liberal	Jonquière	1960	3rd term
Adélard D'Anjou	Union Nationale	Kamouraska	1966	1st term
Fernand Lafontaine	Union Nationale	Labelle	1959	4th term
Joseph-Léonce Desmeules	Union Nationale	Lac-Saint-Jean	1966	1st term
Jean-Paul Beaudry	Union Nationale	LaFontaine	1966	1st term
Robert Lussier	Union Nationale	L'Assomption	1966	1st term
René Lévesque	Liberal	Laurier	1960	3rd term
René Lévesque	Independent	Laurier	1960	3rd term
René Lévesque	Parti Québécois	Laurier	1960	3rd term
Jean-Noël Lavoie	Liberal	Laval	1960	3rd term
André Leduc	Union Nationale	Laviolette	1966	1st term
Jean-Marie Morin	Union Nationale	Lévis	1966	1st term
Armand Maltais	Union Nationale	Limoilou	1956, 1966	3rd term*
Fernand Lizotte	Union Nationale	L'Islet	1948, 1962	5th term*
René Bernatchez	Union Nationale	Lotbinière	1948	6th term
Jean Lesage	Liberal	Louis-Hébert	1960	3rd term
André Léveillé	Union Nationale	Maisonneuve	1966	1st term
Marie-Claire Kirkland	Liberal	Marguerite-Bourgeoys	1961	3rd term
Rémi Paul	Union Nationale	Maskinongé	1966	1st term
Jean Bienvenue	Liberal	Matane	1966	1st term
Bona Arsenault	Liberal	Matapédia	1960	3rd term
Marc Bergeron	Union Nationale	Mégantic	1966	1st term
Robert Bourassa	Liberal	Mercier	1966	1st term
Jean-Jacques Bertrand	Union Nationale	Missisquoi	1948	6th term
Marcel Masse	Union Nationale	Montcalm	1966	1st term
Jean-Paul Cloutier	Union Nationale	Montmagny	1962	2nd term
Gaston Tremblay	Union Nationale	Montmorency	1966	1st term
Gaston Tremblay	Independent	Montmorency	1966	1st term
Gaston Tremblay	Parti nationaliste chrétien	Montmorency	1966	1st term
Gaston Tremblay	Ralliement créditiste	Montmorency	1966	1st term
Laurier Baillargeon	Liberal	Napierville-Laprairie	1962	2nd term
Clément Vincent	Union Nationale	Nicolet	1966	1st term
Eric William Kierans	Liberal	Notre-Dame-de-Grâce	1963	2nd term
William Tetley (1968)	Liberal	Notre-Dame-de-Grâce	1968	1st term
Fernand Picard	Liberal	Olier	1966	1st term
Jérôme Choquette	Liberal	Outremont	1966	1st term
Roland Théorêt	Union Nationale	Papineau	1966	1st term
Raymond Thomas Johnston	Union Nationale	Pontiac	1948	6th term
Marcel-Rosaire Plamondon	Union Nationale	Portneuf	1966	1st term
Maurice Martel	Union Nationale	Richelieu	1966	1st term
Émilien Lafrance	Liberal	Richmond	1952	5th term
Maurice Tessier	Liberal	Rimouski	1966	1st term
Gérard Lebel	Union Nationale	Rivière-du-Loup	1966	1st term
Arthur-Ewen Séguin	Independent	Robert-Baldwin	1966	1st term
Arthur-Ewen Séguin	Liberal	Robert-Baldwin	1966	1st term
Joseph-Georges Gauthier	Union Nationale	Roberval	1962	2nd term
Paul-Yvon Hamel	Union Nationale	Rouville	1966	1st term
Antonio Flamand	Union Nationale	Rouyn-Noranda	1966	1st term
Antonio Flamand	Independent	Rouyn-Noranda	1966	1st term
Pierre-Willie Maltais	Liberal	Saguenay	1964	2nd term
Francis Hanley	Independent	Saint-Anne	1948	6th term
Edgar Charbonneau	Union Nationale	Sainte-Marie	1956	4th term
Jean-Jacques Croteau (1969)	Union Nationale	Sainte-Marie	1969	1st term
Camille Martellani	Union Nationale	Saint-Henri	1966	1st term
Denis Bousquet	Union Nationale	Saint-Hyacinthe	1966	1st term
Paul Dozois	Union Nationale	Saint-Jacques	1956	4th term
Jean Cournoyer (1969)	Union Nationale	Saint-Jacques	1969	1st term
Jérôme Proulx	Union Nationale	Saint-Jean	1966	1st term
Jérôme Proulx	Independent	Saint-Jean	1966	1st term
Jérôme Proulx	Parti Québécois	Saint-Jean	1966	1st term
Léo Pearson	Liberal	Saint-Laurent	1966	1st term
Harry Blank	Liberal	Saint-Louis	1960	3rd term
Philippe Demers	Union Nationale	Saint-Maurice	1966	1st term
Francis Boudreau	Union Nationale	Saint-Sauveur	1948	6th term
Armand Russell	Union Nationale	Shefford	1956	4th term
Raynald Fréchette	Union Nationale	Sherbrooke	1966	1st term
Georges Vaillancourt	Liberal	Stanstead	1960	3rd term
Guy Leduc	Liberal	Taillon	1966	1st term
Gilbert-Roland Théberge	Liberal	Témiscamingue	1962	2nd term
Montcalm Simard	Union Nationale	Témiscouata	1966	1st term
Hubert Murray	Union Nationale	Terrebonne	1966	1st term
Yves Gabias	Union Nationale	Trois-Rivières	1960	3rd term
Gilles Gauthier (1969)	Union Nationale	Trois-Rivières	1969	1st term
Paul Gérin-Lajoie	Liberal	Vaudreuil-Soulanges	1960	3rd term
Francis-Édouard Belliveau (1969)	Union Nationale	Vaudreuil-Soulanges	1969	1st term
Guy Lechasseur	Liberal	Verchères	1960	3rd term
Claude Wagner	Liberal	Verdun	1964	2nd term
John Richard Hyde	Liberal	Westmount	1955	5th term
René Lavoie	Union Nationale	Wolfe	1962	2nd term
Paul Shooner	Union Nationale	Yamaska	1966	1st term

== Other elected MNAs ==
Other MNAs were elected in by-elections during this mandate

- Jean-Guy Cardinal, Union Nationale, Bagot, December 4, 1968
- William Tetley, Quebec Liberal Party, Notre-Dame-de-Grâce, December 4, 1968
- Mario Beaulieu, Union Nationale, Dorion, March 3, 1969
- Gilles Gauthier, Union Nationale, Trois-Rivières, October 8, 1969
- Francis-Édouard Belliveau, Union Nationale, Vaudreuil-Soulanges, October 8, 1969,
- Jean-Jacques Croteau, Union Nationale, Sainte-Marie, October 8, 1969
- Jean Cournoyer, Union Nationale, Saint-Jacques, October 8, 1969

== Cabinet Minister ==
=== Johnson Sr. Cabinet (1966-1968) ===
- Prime Minister and Executive Council President: Daniel Johnson Sr.
- Vice-president of the Executive Council: Jean-Jacques Bertrand
- Agriculture and Colonization: Clement Vincent
- Labour: Maurice Bellemare
- Public Works: Fernand-Joseph Lafontaine (1966–1967), Armand Russell (1967–1968)
- Cultural Affairs: Jean-Noël Tremblay
- Health, Family and Social Welfare: Jean-Paul Cloutier
- Education: Jean-Jacques Bertrand (1966–1967), Jean-Guy Cardinal (1967–1968)
- Lands and Forests: Claude-Gilles Gosselin
- Tourism, Hunting and Fishing: Gabriel Loubier
- Natural Resources: Daniel Johnson Sr. (1966–1967), Paul-Emile Allard (1967–1968)
- Roads: Fernand-Joseph Lafontaine
- Transportation and Communications: Fernand Lizotte
- Municipal Affairs: Paul Dozois (1966–1967), Robert Lussier (1967–1968)
- Federal-provincial Affairs: Daniel Johnson Sr. (1966–1967)
  - Intergovernmental Affairs: Daniel Johnson Sr. (1967–1968)
- Industry and Commerce:Maurice Bellemare (1966–1967), Jean-Paul Beaudry (1967–1968)
- Financial Institutions, Companies and Cooperatives: Paul Dozois (1968)
- Justice: Jean-Jacques Bertrand
- Provincial Secretary: Yves Gabias
- Finances: Paul Dozois
- Revenue: Raymond Thomas Johnston
- State Ministers: Francis Boudreau, Marcel Masse, Roch Boivin, Armand Russell (1966–1967), Edgar Charbonneau, Armand Maltais, Francois-Eugene Mathieu, Paul-Emile Allard (1966–1967), Jean-Marie Morin (1968)

=== Bertrand Cabinet (1968-1970) ===
- Prime Minister and Executive Council President: Jean-Jacques Bertrand
- Vice-president of the Executive Council: Jean-Guy Cardinal
- Agriculture and Colonization: Clément Vincent
- Labour: Maurice Bellemare (1968)
  - Labour and Workforce: Maurice Bellemare (1968–1970), Jean Cournoyer (1970)
- Public Works: Armand Russell
- Public Office: Jean Cournoyer (1969–1970)
- Cultural Affairs: Jean-Noël Tremblay
- Immigration: Yves Gabias (1968–1969), Mario Beaulieu (1969–1970)
- Health, Family and Social Welfare: Jean-Paul Cloutier
- Education: Jean-Guy Cardinal
- Lands and Forests: Claude-Gilles Gosselin
- Tourism, Hunting and Fishing: Gabriel Loubier
- Natural Resources: Paul-Émile Allard
- Roads: Fernand-Joseph Lafontaine
- Transportation and Communications: Fernand Lizotte (1968–1970)
  - Transportation: Fernand Lizotte (1970)
  - Communications: Gérard Lebel (1970)
- Municipal Affairs: Robert Lussier
- Intergovernmental Affairs: Jean-Jacques Bertrand (1968–1969), Marcel Masse (1969–1970)
- Industry and Commerce:Jean-Paul Beaudry
- Financial Institutions, Companies and Cooperatives: Paul Dozois (1968), Yves Gabias (1968–1969), Mario Beaulieu (1969), Armand Maltais (1969–1970)
- Justice: Jean-Jacques Bertrand (1968–1969), Rémi Paul (1969–1970)
- Provincial Secretary: Yves Gabias (1968), Rémi Paul (1968–1970)
- Finances: Paul Dozois (1968–1969), Jean-Jacques Bertrand (1969), Mario Beaulieu (1969–1970)
- Revenu: Raymond Thomas Johnston
- State Ministers: Roch Boivin, Jean-Marie Morin, Francois-Eugène Mathieu, Francis Boudreau, Marcel Masse (1968), François Gagnon (1969–1970), Edgar Charbonneau

== Diagram ==
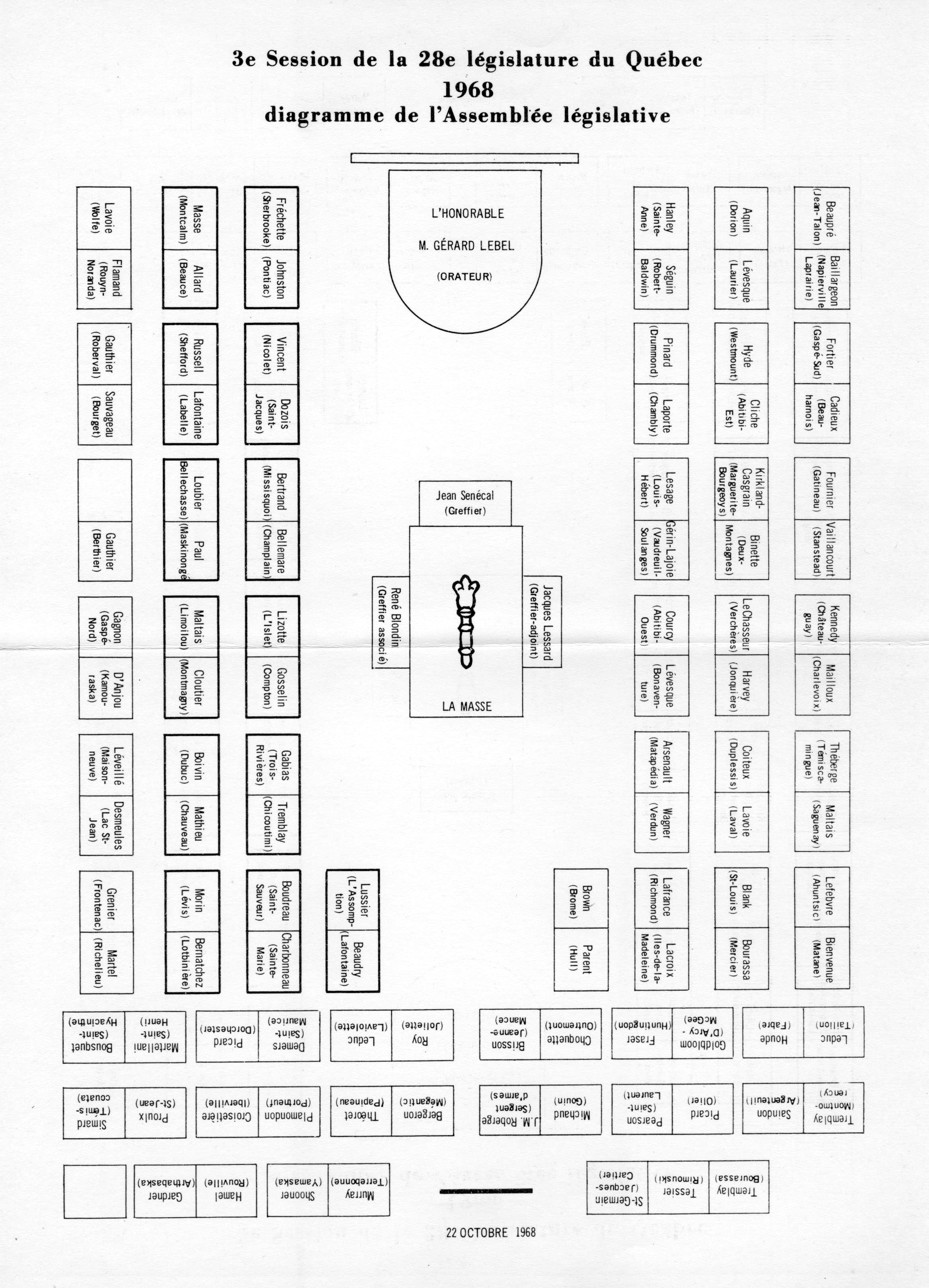
Diagram of the 3rd Session of the 28th Legislature, as of 22 October 1968
