= Union Nationale candidates in the 1970 Quebec provincial election =

1970 Quebec provincial election

The Union Nationale fielded a full slate of 108 candidates under the leadership of Jean-Jacques Bertrand in the 1970 Quebec provincial election. Although it entered the election as the governing party, it won only seventeen seats and emerged as the official opposition in the next sitting of the National Assembly. The party, which had dominated Quebec politics at the provincial level for most of the period since 1936, was never again a serious contender for power after this election.

== Candidates ==
Note: This section is incomplete.

Riding	Candidate's Name	Notes	Gender	Residence	Occupation	Votes	%	Rank
Abitibi-Est	Réjean Hamel		M			4,224		4th
Abitibi-Ouest	Dominique Godbout					1,626		3rd
Ahuntsic	Euclide Laliberté		M			3,760		3rd
Argenteuil	William McOuat Cottingham	Incumbent; former minister of mines	M			3,964		2rd
Arthabaska	Roch Gardner	Incumbent	M			5,983		3rd
Bagot	Jean-Guy Cardinal	Incumbent; minister of education; later a Parti Québécois MNA	M			4,591		1st
Beauce	Paul-Émile Allard	Incumbent; minister of natural resources	M			9,360		2nd
Beauharnois	Lucien Leduc		M			5,515		3rd
Bellechasse	Gabriel Loubier	Incumbent; minister of tourism and fishing; led the Union Nationale from 1971 to 1974	M			6,111		1st
Berthier	Guy Gauthier	Incumbent	M			5,387		1st
Bonaventure	Jean-Guy Roussy		M			5,074		2nd
Bourassa	Réal Gibeau	Gibeau served on the Montréal-Nord city council from 1978 to 1996 as a member of mayor Yves Ryan's Renouveau municipal party. He died on August 28, 1996. His son, Jean-Marc Gibeau, was a Montréal-Nord city councillor from 1996 to 2001 and a Montreal city councillor from 2002 to 2017.	M		Insurance broker	4,265	8.76	3rd
