= New Democratic Party of Quebec candidates in the 1970 Quebec provincial election =

The New Democratic Party fielded thirteen candidates in the 1970 Quebec provincial election, none of whom were elected. Information about these candidates may be found on this page.

== Electoral divisions ==
Riding	Candidate's name	Gender	Votes	%	Rank	Notes
Bourget	Roger Hébert	M	108		5th	
Fabre	Gaston McKenty	M	182		5th	
Lafontaine	Ulysse Bastarache	M	128		5th	
Maisonneuve	Jean-L. Éthier	M	252		5th	
Marguerite-Bourgeoys	Roland Morin	M	378		5th	Provincial leader. See the 1985 election for biographical notes.
Notre-Dame-de-Grâce	Donald Robson Peacock	M	843		3rd	
Outremont	Nathan Gans	M	307		4th	
Saint-Henri	Michael Fish	M	295		4th	
Saint-Laurent	Gérard Marotte	M	483		4th	
Saint-Louis	Joshn-Parish Arnopoulos	M	376		4th	
Sherbrooke	Jean-Paul Blouin	M	307		5th	
Verdun	Gendron E. Haines	M	186		7th	
Westmount	Norman Weiner	M	529		4th	
