= Jean-Paul Cloutier =

Canadian politician (1924–2010)

Member of the Legislative Assembly of Quebec for Montmagny
- In office 1962–1973
- Preceded by: Laurent Lizotte
- Succeeded by: District was abolished in 1972

Personal details
- Born: September 8, 1924 Saint-Paul-de-Montminy, Quebec
- Died: December 19, 2010 (aged 86) Quebec City, Quebec
- Party: Union Nationale

Jean-Paul Cloutier, CM (September 8, 1924 – December 19, 2010) was a Canadian politician from Quebec.

== Background ==
He was born on September 8, 1924, in Saint-Paul-de-Montminy, Quebec, and made a career in accounting and business.

== Member of the legislature ==
Cloutier ran as a Union Nationale candidate in 1962 for the district of Montmagny and won.

== Cabinet member ==
He was re-elected in 1966 and was appointed to Premier Daniel Johnson Sr.'s Cabinet. Cloutier served as Minister of Family and Social Welfare. Under his tenure, the department laid the groundwork for the public health insurance plan that would later be implemented by his Liberal successor Claude Castonguay.

Cloutier was re-elected in 1970, but was defeated in 1973.

== City politics ==
He ran as the Parti du renouveau municipal mayoral candidate in Sainte-Foy, Quebec, in 1985, but lost against Andrée Boucher.

In 2000, he was made a Member of the Order of Canada.

== Death ==
He died in Quebec City on December 19, 2010.

Government offices
Preceded by René Lévesque (Liberal)	Minister of Family and Social Welfare; 1966–1970	Succeeded by Claude Castonguay (Liberal)
