= Montcalm Simard =

Canadian politician (1921-2011)

Member of the National Assembly of Quebec for Témiscouata
- In office 1966–1973
- Preceded by: Antoine Raymond
- Succeeded by: District was abolished in 1972

Personal details
- Born: October 4, 1921 Rivière-Bleue, Quebec
- Died: January 25, 2011 (aged 89) Rivière-Bleue, Quebec
- Party: Union Nationale
- Relations: Jean-Maurice Simard, brother

Montcalm Simard (October 4, 1921 – January 25, 2011) was a Canadian politician in the Province of Quebec.

== Background ==
Born in Rivière-Bleue, Quebec in the Bas-Saint-Laurent region near Maine and New Brunswick, he was the brother of politician Jean-Maurice Simard, who was a Progressive Conservative member of the Legislative Assembly of the province of New Brunswick and Cabinet Minister from 1970 to 1985 and a member of the Senate of Canada from 1985 to 2001.

== Mayor ==
Simard served as Mayor of Rivière-Bleue from 1957 to 1960 and from 1964 to 1975.

== Member of the Provincial Legislature ==
He ran as a Union Nationale candidate in the 1966 election in the district of Témiscouata and won. He was re-elected in the 1970 election, but he did not run for re-election in the 1973 election.
