= Jean-Noël Lavoie =

Canadian politician

1st Mayor of Laval
- In office 1965–1965
- Preceded by: first mayor
- Succeeded by: Jacques Tétreault

MNA for Laval
- In office 1960–1981
- Preceded by: Léopold Pouliot
- Succeeded by: riding dissolved

Personal details
- Born: November 24, 1927 Montreal, Quebec
- Died: March 17, 2013 (aged 85) Cannes, France
- Spouse: Régine L'Héritier
- Children: Martine Lavoie Sophie Lavoie
- Profession: notary

Jean-Noël Lavoie (French pronunciation: [ʒɑ̃ nɔɛl lavwa]; November 24, 1927 – March 17, 2013) was a notary and former political figure in Quebec. He represented Laval in the Legislative Assembly of Quebec and then the National Assembly of Quebec from 1960 to 1981 as a Liberal.

He was born in Montreal, the son of Zéphirin Lavoie and Laura Gaudreault, and was educated at the Saint-Arsène Orphanage there, at the Collège Laval in Saint-Vincent-de-Paul, at the Collège de Saint-Laurent and the Université de Montréal. He also received officer training at CFB Borden. Lavoie qualified as a notary in 1951 and entered practice in L'Abord-à-Plouffe (later part of Laval). He served as alderman for L'Abord-à-Plouffe and was mayor from 1959 to 1961. Lavoie was mayor of the newly formed city of Chomedey from 1961 to 1965. In 1962, he founded Opinions de l'Île-Jésus/Citizen of Île-Jésus. He was a driving force behind the formation of the city of Laval and was its first mayor in 1965; he was defeated when he ran for reelection later that year.

Lavoie ran unsuccessfully for a seat in the Quebec assembly in 1956 and then was elected in 1960 and re-elected in 1962 and 1966. He resigned his seat in the assembly in 1969 to run unsuccessfully for mayor of Laval, Quebec; Lavoie was reelected to the assembly in 1970, 1973 and 1976. He was President of the National Assembly of Quebec from 1970 to 1976. Lavoie was opposition house leader in the assembly from 1976 to 1979. He did not run for reelection in 1981.

He was named to the Order of Canada in 1992 and to the Order of La Pléiade in 1991. He published La saga de Laval in 1998.
