= Olier =

Quebec electoral district

Defunct provincial electoral district
- Legislature: National Assembly of Quebec
- District created: 1965
- District abolished: 1972
- First contested: 1966
- Last contested: 1970

Olier was a former provincial electoral district in the Montreal region of Quebec, Canada that elected members to the National Assembly of Quebec. It encompassed the territory of the City of Saint-Leonard, and part of the city of Montreal. Notably the neighbourhoods of Saint-Michel and François-Perrault.

It was created in 1965 for the 1966 election, from part of Bourget electoral district. Due to the rapid growth in the area its final election was in 1970. It disappeared in the 1973 election and its successor was split among three electoral districts Viau, Jeanne-Mance and Bourassa.

Its only representative was Fernand Picard of the Liberal party of Quebec.

== Members of the Legislative Assembly / National Assembly ==
Legislature	Years	Member	Party
Riding created from Bourget
28th	1966–1970	Fernand Picard (politician)	Liberal
29th	1970–1973	Fernand Picard (politician)	Liberal
Dissolved into Jeanne-Mance, Viau, Bourassa

== Election results ==
1970 Quebec general election
Party	Candidate	Votes	%	±%
Liberal	Fernand Picard	22,649	50.38	
Parti Québécois	Lucien Laplante	16691	37.13	
Union Nationale	Richard Morency	3994	8.88	
Ralliement créditiste	Jean Trudeau	1624	3.61	

1966 Quebec general election
Party	Candidate	Votes	%	±%
Liberal	Fernand Picard	11,990	47.03	
Union Nationale	Maurice Constantineau	9674	37.95	
RIN	Fernand Boudreau	3366	13.20	
Ralliement national	J.-Gérard Biron	464	1.82	
