= Montréal–Jeanne-Mance =

Quebec electoral district

Defunct provincial electoral district
- Legislature: National Assembly of Quebec
- District created: 1939; 86 years ago
- District abolished: 1965; 60 years ago
- First contested: 1939; 86 years ago
- Last contested: 1962; 63 years ago

Montréal–Jeanne-Mance (French pronunciation: [mɔ̃ʁeal ʒan mɑ̃s]) was a former provincial electoral district in the Montreal region of Quebec, Canada that elected members to the Legislative Assembly of Quebec.

It was created for the 1939 election from parts of Maisonneuve, Montréal-Dorion and Montréal-Mercier electoral districts. Its final election was in 1962. It disappeared in the 1966 election and its successor electoral district was Jeanne-Mance.

== Members of the Legislative Assembly ==
- Joseph-Émile Dubreuil, Liberal (1939–1948)
- George Guévremont, Union Nationale (1948–1952)
- Jean-Paul Noël, Liberal (1952–1956)
- Maurice Custeau, Union Nationale (1956–1962)
- Aimé Brisson, Liberal (1962–1966)
