= François Gagnon (politician) =

Canadian politician

Member of the Legislative Assembly of Quebec for Gaspé-Nord
- In office 1962–1973
- Preceded by: Claude Jourdain
- Succeeded by: District was abolished

Personal details
- Born: April 18, 1922 Cap-Chat, Quebec
- Died: May 4, 2017 (aged 95)
- Party: Union Nationale

François Gagnon (April 18, 1922 – May 4, 2017) was a Canadian politician from Quebec.

== Background ==
He was born on April 18, 1922, in Cap-Chat, Quebec, and was a public servant.

== Member of the legislature ==
Gagnon won a seat to the Legislative Assembly of Quebec in the 1962 provincial election in the district of Gaspé-Nord. He supported the Union Nationale and was re-elected in the 1966 election. He was parliamentary assistant from 1966 to 1969.

== Cabinet Member ==
Gagnon was appointed to the Cabinet, serving as Minister responsible for Public Works from 1969 to 1970. He was re-elected in 1970, but did not run for re-election in 1973.

== Mayor ==
He was Mayor of Cap-Chat from 1976 to 1977 and from 1981 to 1985.

== Political comeback ==
Gagnon considered a political comeback with the Parti Québécois in the 1976 provincial election and with the Progressive Conservatives in the 1984 federal election, but eventually declined each time.
