= René Lavoie =

Canadian politician

Member of the Legislative Assembly of Quebec for Wolfe
- In office 1962–1973
- Preceded by: Gérard Lemieux
- Succeeded by: District abolished in 1972

Personal details
- Born: July 24, 1921 Disraëli, Quebec
- Died: December 12, 2000 (aged 79) Thetford Mines, Quebec
- Party: Union Nationale

René Lavoie (July 24, 1921 – December 12, 2000) was a Canadian politician from Quebec.

== Background ==
He was born on July 24, 1921, in Disraeli, Chaudière-Appalaches.

== Member of the legislature ==
Lavoie unsuccessfully ran as a Union Nationale candidate in the 1960 election in the district of Wolfe. He was elected in the 1962 election and was re-elected in the 1966 and 1970 elections.

He served as parliamentary assistant from 1966 to 1970 and as his party's House Whip from 1966 until 1973. He did not run for re-election in the 1973 election.

== Local Politics ==
Lavoie also served as a school board member in Disraeli from 1964 to 1966.

== Death ==
He died on December 12, 2000.
