= Maurice Custeau =

Canadian politician

Maurice-Tréflé Custeau

Member of the Legislative Assembly of Quebec for Montréal–Jeanne-Mance
- In office 1956–1962
- Preceded by: Jean-Paul Noël
- Succeeded by: Aimé Brisson ⋅

Personal details
- Born: March 10, 1916 Montreal, Quebec
- Died: August 19, 1990 (aged 74) Montreal, Quebec
- Party: Union Nationale
- Occupation: Businessman

Maurice-Tréflé Custeau (March 10, 1916 – August 19, 1990) was a Canadian businessman and politician. He was a Member of the provincial legislature and a city councillor in Montreal, Quebec, Canada.

== Background ==
He was born in Montreal, Quebec, on March 10, 1916 and was a businessman.

== City Councillor ==
Custeau was appointed to the Montreal City Council by the Jeune Chambre de commerce de Montréal (Young Chamber of Commerce) and served from 1950 to 1954.

== Member of the legislature ==
He successfully ran as a Union Nationale candidate in the district of Montréal–Jeanne-Mance in 1956 and was re-elected in 1960.

He served as Parliamentary Assistant from 1959 to 1960 and briefly as a Minister without Portfolio in 1960.

He lost his bid for re-election in 1962 against Liberal candidate Aimé Brisson.

He also ran in the district of Dorion in 1966, but lost again.

== Death ==
Custeau died on August 19, 1990.
