= Joseph-Émile Dubreuil =

Canadian politician

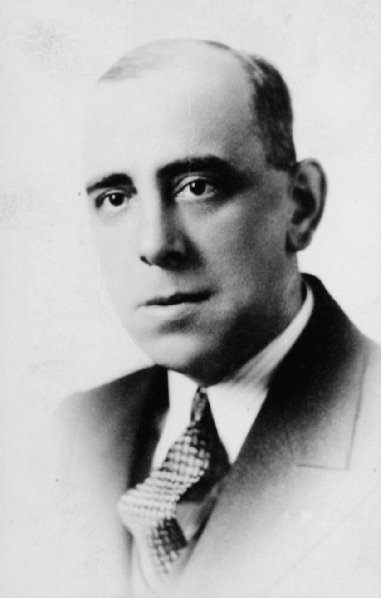

Member of the Legislative Assembly of Quebec for Montréal–Jeanne-Mance
- In office 1939–1948
- Preceded by: District created
- Succeeded by: George Guévremont

Personal details
- Born: December 15, 1894 Montreal, Quebec
- Died: September 29, 1959 (aged 64) Montreal, Quebec
- Resting place: Notre Dame des Neiges Cemetery
- Party: Liberal

Joseph-Émile Dubreuil (December 15, 1894 – September 29, 1959) was a Canadian provincial politician.

Born in Montreal, Quebec, Dubreuil was the member of the Legislative Assembly of Quebec for Montréal–Jeanne-Mance from 1939 to 1948.

In 1937, a Crucifix was hung in the Montreal city council at the initiative of Dubreuil. The Crucifix would hung there until 2019. Dubreuil was a devout Catholic.
