= Guy Gauthier =

Canadian politician

Member of the Legislative Assembly of Quebec for Berthier
- In office 1966–1973
- Preceded by: Lucien McGuire
- Succeeded by: Michel Denis

Personal details
- Born: March 20, 1920 Acton Vale, Quebec
- Died: March 10, 2014 (aged 93) Laval, Quebec
- Party: Union Nationale

Guy Gauthier (March 20, 1920 – March 10, 2014) was a Canadian politician and a Member of the Legislative Assembly of Quebec.

== Background ==
He was born in Acton Vale, Montérégie and became a physician.

== Municipal politics ==
Gauthier served as a city councillor from 1950 to 1953, as Mayor from 1955 to 1972 and as school board member from 1959 to 1963 in Saint-Michel-des-Saints.

== Member of the legislature ==
He ran as a Union Nationale candidate in the 1966 election in the provincial district of Berthier and won. He served as the parliamentary assistant to the Minister of Health in 1969 and 1970. He was re-elected in the 1970 election.

Gauthier served as his party's Deputy House Whip from 1966 to 1972. He lost the 1973 election against Liberal candidate Michel Denis.
