= Claude Castonguay =

Canadian politician (1929–2020)

The Honourable Claude Castonguay CC GOQ
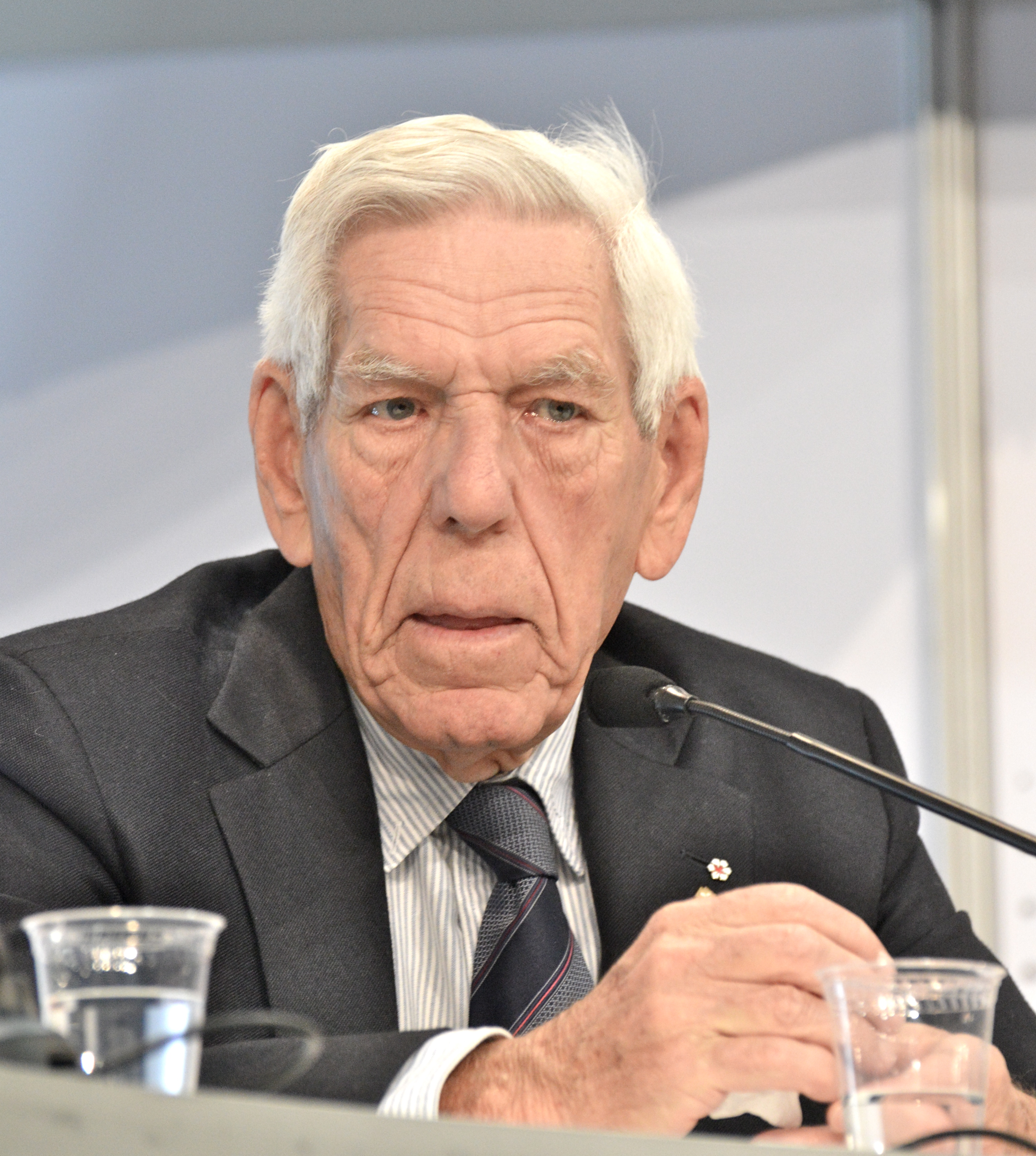
- Claude Castonguay in 2015

Senator for Stadacona, Quebec
- In office September 23, 1990 – December 9, 1992
- Appointed by: Brian Mulroney
- Preceded by: Martial Asselin
- Succeeded by: Jean-Claude Rivest

Member of the National Assembly of Quebec for Louis-Hébert
- In office April 29, 1970 – October 28, 1973
- Preceded by: Jean Lesage
- Succeeded by: Gaston Desjardins

Personal details
- Born: May 8, 1929 Quebec City, Quebec, Canada
- Died: December 12, 2020 (aged 91)
- Party: Progressive Conservative (fed.); Liberal (prov.)
- Education: Université Laval; University of Manitoba

Claude Castonguay, CC GOQ (May 8, 1929 – December 12, 2020) was a Canadian politician, educator, and businessman.

== Career ==
Born in Quebec City, Quebec, the son of Émile Castonguay and Jeanne Gauvin, he studied science at Université Laval, followed by actuarial science at the University of Manitoba.

He taught at Université Laval from 1951 until 1957. He was elected in the 1970 Quebec election to the National Assembly of Quebec in the riding of Louis-Hebert. He served as Minister of Health, Family and Social Welfare. He did not run in 1973. In 1978, he was the President-elect of the Canadian Institute of Actuaries. From 1982 until 1989, he was the chief executive officer of the Laurentian Group Corporation and president of the Laurentian Bank of Canada. From 1989 to 1990, he was the chairman of the Conference Board of Canada. He was the Chancellor of the Université de Montréal from 1986 until 1990.

He was appointed to the Senate, as a member of the Progressive Conservative caucus. He represented the senatorial division of Stadacona, Quebec, from September 23, 1990, until his resignation on December 9, 1992.

== Castonguay-Nepveu Commission ==
During the 1960s, the Jean Lesage Quebec government mandated Castonguay to chair a Commission (with Gerard Nepveu)- The commission on health care and social services (Commission d'enquête sur les services de santé et les services sociaux)- on the state of health care in Quebec much of which, before the Quiet Revolution, was still largely under the jurisdiction of the Clergy. The result was the Castonguay-Nepveu Report published in 1967. This report recommended a new state-run health insurance policy, a new health care network, as well as a new network of social service clinics now known as the CLSC. The plan was to give a broader access to health and psychiatric care for the Quebec population. Major changes were made following the recommendation, most notably the introduction of hospitalisation and medication insurance. Castonguay is so closely identified with health care in Quebec that many people refer to the Quebec health card (Carte d'assurance-maladie au Québec) as a Castonguette.

== Castonguay task force on Quebec health care ==
In 2007, the minority Liberal government of Quebec appointed Castonguay to a closed-door committee examining the health-care system's finances. Castonguay is a long-serving advocate of greater privatization, user fees and private insurance.

The Castonguay task force released in February 2008 said Quebec residents should pay $25 for every visit to a doctor. The report also called for an increase of up to one percentage point in the Quebec sales tax to help pay for medicare. Castonguay said health care is growing 5.8 per cent a year as a share of the provincial budget, while total government spending increases 3.9 per cent annually.

Most of the report was publicly dismissed by the government of the day.

Forty years after being one of the pioneers of public health care, Castonguay's commission advocates both an increased role for private enterprise in medicine and increased public investment in the socialized system both through taxes and through user fees. Castonguay was quoted as saying "We are proposing to give a greater role to the private sector so that people can exercise freedom of choice." While concerned about the financial stresses the system places on the government, Castonguay does not advocate dismantling publicly financed health insurance altogether.

== Death ==
He died on December 12, 2020, at the age of 91.

== Honours ==
- In 1974, he was made a Companion of the Order of Canada.
- In 1991, he was made an Officer of the National Order of Quebec. In 2014, he was promoted to Grand Officer.
- He was awarded Honorary Doctor of Laws from Bishop's University, McGill University, the University of Toronto, the University of Manitoba, Laurentian University, Concordia University, the University of Western Ontario and York University.
