= Jeanne-Mance (provincial electoral district) =

Coordinates: 45°35′09″N 73°35′46″W

Quebec electoral district

Defunct provincial electoral district
- Legislature: National Assembly of Quebec
- District created: 1965
- District abolished: 2001
- First contested: 1966
- Last contested: 1998

Demographics
- Census division: Montreal (part)
- Census subdivision: Montreal (part)

Jeanne-Mance (French pronunciation: [ʒan mɑ̃s]) was a former provincial electoral district in Quebec, Canada.

It was created for the 1966 election from parts of Montréal–Jeanne-Mance electoral district. Its final election was in 1998. It disappeared in the 2003 election, as nearly all of its territory and a part of Viger electoral district were merged to become the Jeanne-Mance–Viger electoral district.

Prior to the 1973 election, the riding primarily encompassed parts of Montreal's Mercier-Hochelaga-Maisonneuve and Rosemont neighbourhoods.

From 1973 until its dissolution in 2003, it covered all or part of the city and later borough of Saint-Léonard and the neighbourhood of Saint-Michel in Montreal.

It was named in honour of French settler Jeanne Mance.

== Members of the Legislative Assembly / National Assembly ==
Legislature	Years	Member	Party
Riding created from Montréal–Jeanne-Mance
28th	1966–1970	Aimé Brisson	Liberal
29th	1970–1973	Aimé Brisson	Liberal
30th	1973–1976	Aimé Brisson	Liberal
31st	1976–1981	Henri Laberge	Parti Québécois
32nd	1981–1985	Michel Bissonnet	Liberal
33rd	1985–1989	Michel Bissonnet	Liberal
34th	1989–1994	Michel Bissonnet	Liberal
35th	1994–1998	Michel Bissonnet	Liberal
36th	1998–2003	Michel Bissonnet	Liberal
Dissolved into Jeanne-Mance–Viger

== Election results ==
1998 Quebec general election
Party	Candidate	Votes	%	±%
Liberal	Michel Bissonnet	22669	77.31	
Parti Québécois	Robert La Rose	4779	16.30	
Action démocratique	Jean-François Pelletier	1596	5.44	
Equality	Peter Margo	139	0.47	
Socialist Democracy	Stéphane Simard	78	0.27	
Parti innovateur du Québec	Jean Yves Thorne	62	0.21	

1995 Quebec referendum
Side	Votes	%
Non	26,395	75.31
Oui	8,654	24.69

1994 Quebec general election
Party	Candidate	Votes	%	±%
Liberal	Michel Bissonnet	21294	74.22	
Parti Québécois	Jean Emmanuel Charlot	6534	22.77	
Parti innovateur du Québec	Monique Robillard	540	1.88	
Natural Law	Ronald L'Italien	322	1.12	

1989 Quebec general election
Party	Candidate	Votes	%	±%
Liberal	Michel Bissonnet	17296	65.06	
Parti Québécois	Louise Brouillet	6959	26.18	
Equality	Tony Cipriani	1930	7.26	
Parti des travailleurs du Québec	Serge Laurenzi	399	1.50	

1985 Quebec general election
Party	Candidate	Votes	%	±%
Liberal	Michel Bissonnet	20772	70.24	
Parti Québécois	Marielle Laberge	13472	25.33	
Progressive Conservative	Michel Denis	609	2.06	
New Democratic	Vincent Guadagnano	411	1.39	
Union Nationale	Roland Thibault	150	0.51	
Socialist Movement	Antonio Vitale	100	0.34	
Christian Socialist	Daniel Malboeuf	40	0.13	

1981 Quebec general election
Party	Candidate	Votes	%	±%
Liberal	Michel Bissonnet	19652	58.65	
Parti Québécois	Henri Laberge	13472	40.20	
Union Nationale	Vincenza Pennestri-Gauthier	385	1.15	

1980 Quebec referendum
Side	Votes	%
Non	39,412	67.46
Oui	19,008	32.54

1976 Quebec general election
Party	Candidate	Votes	%	±%
Parti Québécois	Henri Laberge	22,891	45.48	
Liberal	Aimé Brisson	18,285	36.33	
Union Nationale	Pierre Grégoire	7732	15.36	
Ralliement créditiste	Nicolino Ciarla	905	1.80	
Parti national populaire	Raymond O'Connor	275	0.55	
Communist	Bernadette Desrosiers Le Brun	157	0.31	
Independent	Paul Kouri	88	0.17	

1973 Quebec general election
Party	Candidate	Votes	%	±%
Liberal	Aimé Brisson	22308	55.10	
Parti Québécois	Jean Girard	16473	40.69	
Union Nationale	Suzanne Charbonneau Touchette	632	1.56	

1970 Quebec general election
Party	Candidate	Votes	%	±%
Liberal	Aimé Brisson	21515	48.48	
Parti Québécois	Robert Boily	16866	38.01	
Union Nationale	Louis Desrosiers	4797	10.81	
Ralliement créditiste	Aurélien Déry	1197	2.70	

1966 Quebec general election
Party	Candidate	Votes	%	±%
Liberal	Aimé Brisson	16691	51.85	
Union Nationale	Jacques Dinelle	10628	33.01	
RIN	Bruno Colpron	4271	13.27	
Ralliement national	Georges Goyer	333	1.03	
Parti de la souveraineté du Québec	Jean-Marie Bédard	269	0.84	
