= Gaspé-Nord =

Quebec electoral district

Defunct provincial electoral district
- Legislature: National Assembly of Quebec
- District created: 1930
- District abolished: 1972
- First contested: 1931
- Last contested: 1970

Gaspé-Nord was a former provincial electoral district in the Gaspésie area of Quebec, Canada. It elected members to the National Assembly of Quebec (earlier known as the Legislative Assembly of Quebec).

It was created for the 1931 election by splitting the existing Gaspé electoral district into Gaspé-Nord and Gaspé-Sud. Its final election was in 1970. It disappeared, along with Gaspé-Sud, in the 1973 election and its successor electoral district was the reunited Gaspé.

== Members of the Legislative Assembly / National Assembly ==
Legislature	Years	Member	Party
18th	1931–1935	Thomas Côté	Liberal
19th	1935–1936	Thomas Côté	Liberal
20th	1936–1939	Joseph-Alphonse Pelletier	Union nationale
21st	1939–1944	Perreault Casgrain	Liberal
22nd	1944–1948	Joseph-Alphonse Pelletier	Union nationale
23rd	1948–1952	Robert Lévesque	Liberal
24th	1952–1956	Alphonse Couturier	Union nationale
25th	1956–1960	Alphonse Couturier	Union nationale
26th	1960–1962	Claude Jourdain	Liberal
27th	1962–1966	François Gagnon	Union nationale
28th	1966–1970	François Gagnon	Union nationale
29th	1970–1973	François Gagnon	Union nationale
