= Gaspé-Sud =

Quebec electoral district

Defunct provincial electoral district
- Legislature: National Assembly of Quebec
- District created: 1930
- District abolished: 1972
- First contested: 1931
- Last contested: 1970

Gaspé-Sud was a former provincial electoral district in the Gaspésie area of Quebec, Canada. It elected members to the National Assembly of Quebec (earlier known as the Legislative Assembly of Quebec).

It was created for the 1931 election by splitting the existing Gaspé electoral district into Gaspé-Nord and Gaspé-Sud. Its final election was in 1970. It disappeared, along with Gaspé-Nord, in the 1973 election and its successor electoral district was the reunited Gaspé.

== Members of the Legislative Assembly / National Assembly ==
Legislature	Years	Member	Party
18th	1931–1935	Alexandre Chouinard	Liberal
19th	1935–1936	Alexandre Chouinard	Liberal
20th	1936–1939	Camille Eugène Pouliot	Union nationale
21st	1939–1944	Camille Eugène Pouliot	Union nationale
22nd	1944–1948	Camille Eugène Pouliot	Union nationale
23rd	1948–1952	Camille Eugène Pouliot	Union nationale
24th	1952–1956	Camille Eugène Pouliot	Union nationale
25th	1956–1960	Camille Eugène Pouliot	Union nationale
26th	1960–1962	Camille Eugène Pouliot	Union nationale
27th	1962–1966	Guy Fortier	Liberal
28th	1966–1970	Guy Fortier	Liberal
29th	1970–1973	Guy Fortier	Liberal
