= Limoilou (electoral district) =

Quebec electoral district

Defunct provincial electoral district
- Legislature: National Assembly of Quebec
- District created: 1965
- District abolished: 2001
- First contested: 1966
- Last contested: 1998

Limoilou was a former provincial electoral district in Quebec, Canada. It was located in the general area of the city of Limoilou (today part of the La Cité-Limoilou borough of Quebec City).

It was created for the 1966 election from part of the Québec-Est electoral district. Its final election was in 1998. It disappeared in the 2003 election, as nearly all of its territory and a part of Montmorency electoral district were merged to become the Jean-Lesage electoral district.

== Members of the Legislative Assembly / National Assembly ==
| Legislature | Years | Member | Party |
|---|---|---|---|
Riding created from Québec-Est
| 28th | 1966–1970 | Armand Maltais | Union Nationale |
| 29th | 1970–1973 | Fernand Houde | Liberal |
| 30th | 1973–1976 | Fernand Houde | Liberal |
| 31st | 1976–1981 | Raymond Gravel | Parti Québécois |
| 32nd | 1981–1985 | Raymond Gravel | Parti Québécois |
| 33rd | 1985–1989 | Michel Després | Liberal |
| 34th | 1989–1994 | Michel Després | Liberal |
| 35th | 1994–1998 | Michel Rivard | Parti Québécois |
| 36th | 1998–2003 | Michel Després | Liberal |
Dissolved into Jean-Lesage
