= Gilles Houde =

Canadian politician

Member of the National Assembly of Quebec for Fabre
- In office June 5, 1966 – November 15, 1976
- Preceded by: Bernard Landry

Personal details
- Born: April 23, 1932 Montreal, Quebec, Canada
- Died: June 14, 2014 (aged 82) Magog, Quebec, Canada
- Party: Liberal

Gilles Houde (April 23, 1932 – June 14, 2014) was a Canadian politician who served in the National Assembly of Quebec from 1966 to 1976. He represented the electoral district of Fabre as a member of the Quebec Liberal Party.

Prior to his career in politics, Houde worked as a physical education teacher. Following his defeat in the 1976 election, he joined Le Devoir as a sportswriter, and later hosted sports and health programming for both Télévision de Radio-Canada and TVA.
