= 1973 Quebec general election =

Canadian provincial election

- October 29, 1973

110 seats in the 30th National Assembly of Quebec 56 seats were needed for a majority
- Turnout: 80.39% (▼3.84%)
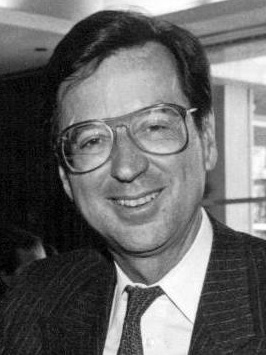

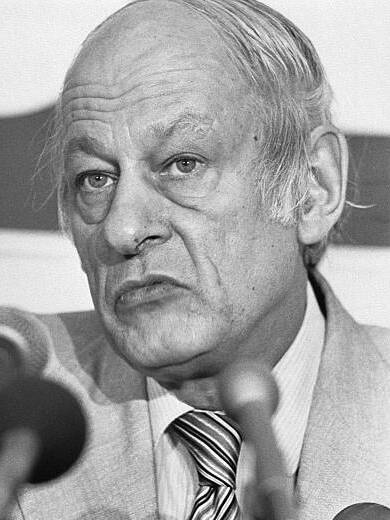

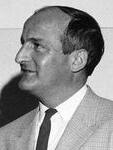
	First party	Second party
Leader	Robert Bourassa	René Lévesque
Party	Liberal	Parti Québécois
Leader since	January 17, 1970	October 14, 1968
Leader's seat	Mercier	Lost election in Dorion
Last election	72 seats, 45.40%	7 seats, 23.06%
Seats won	102	6
Seat change	▲30	▼1
Popular vote	1,623,734	897,809
Percentage	54.65%	30.22%
Swing	▲9.25%	▲7.16%
	Third party	Fourth party
	PC
Leader	Yvon Dupuis	Gabriel Loubier
Party	Parti créditiste	Union Nationale
Leader since	February 4, 1973	June 19, 1971
Leader's seat	Lost election in Saint-Jean	Bellechasse (lost re-election)
Last election	12 seats, 11.19%	17 seats, 19.65%
Seats won	2	0
Seat change	▼10	▼17
Popular vote	294,706	146,209
Percentage	9.92%	4.92%
Swing	▼1.27%	▼14.73%
- Popular vote by riding. As this is an FPTP election, seat totals are not determined by popular vote, but instead via results by each riding. Click the map for more details.
Premier before election
Robert Bourassa
Liberal
Premier after election
Robert Bourassa
Liberal

The 1973 Quebec general election was held on October 29, 1973 to elect members to National Assembly of Quebec, Canada. The incumbent Quebec Liberal Party, led by Premier Robert Bourassa, won re-election, defeating the Parti Québécois, led by René Lévesque, and the Union Nationale (UN).

The Liberals won the largest majority government in the province's history, with 102 seats. In the process, they reduced the opposition to just eight seats (six PQ, two créditistes) in total. The Parti Québécois held its own, losing only one seat, and despite having fewer seats, became the official Opposition, although PQ leader René Lévesque failed to win a seat in the Assembly.

The Union Nationale, which had held power until the previous 1970 general election, was wiped off the electoral map, losing all 17 of its seats. It would be the first time since the UN's founding in 1935 that the party was without representation in the legislature. However, UN candidate Maurice Bellemare later won a seat in a 1974 by-election.

The popular vote was not as lopsided as the seat count would indicate, even though the Liberals won 54 per cent of the popular vote. The Parti Québécois, for instance, won 30% of the popular vote, a significant improvement over their previous showing of 23% in the 1970 election. However, their support was spread out across the entire province, and was not concentrated in enough areas to translate into more seats. Quebec elections have historically produced significant disparities in seat counts.

== Legislative reforms (1970–1973) ==
=== Abolition of protected ridings ===
Upon Confederation in 1867, section 80 of the British North America Act, 1867 provided for the following ridings in the Legislative Assembly to be protected from having their boundaries altered without the consent of the majority of the members representing them:

- Argenteuil
- Brome
- Compton
- Huntingdon
- Mégantic
- Missisquoi
- Ottawa
  - Labelle was carved out in 1912
    - Papineau was carved out from Labelle in 1922
  - Ottawa was divided into Hull and Papineau in 1919
- Pontiac
  - Témiscaming was carved out in 1912
    - Abitibi was carved out from Témiscamingue in 1922
- Richmond and Wolfe (divided into Richmond and Wolfe in 1890)
- Shefford
- Sherbrooke
- Stanstead

Consent by a majority of the members of the 18 districts concerned was finally secured in December 1970, and the constitutional restrictions were accordingly revoked. Work would then proceed on a comprehensive redistribution for the next ensuing election.

=== Redistribution of ridings ===
A 1972 Act increased the number of MNAs from 108 to 110 through the following changes:

Abolished ridings	New ridings
Drawn from parts of other ridings
	Anjou (Note: from parts of Bourassa, Bourget and LaFontaine); Charlesbourg (Note: from parts of Chauveau and Montmorency); Laporte (Note: from parts of Taillon and Chambly); Mont-Royal (Note: from parts of D'Arcy-McGee, Dorion and Outremont); Pointe-Claire (Note: from parts of the existing Jacques-Cartier and Robert-Baldwin); Prévost (Note: from parts of Montcalm and Terrebonne); Rosemont (Note: from parts of Gouin and Jeanne-Mance); Saint-François (Note: from parts of Compton, Richmond and Sherbrooke); Taschereau (Note: from parts of Jean-Talon and Saint-Sauveur); Viau (Note: from parts of Dorion, Gouin, Jeanne-Mance and Olier)
Abolition of ridings
Dorchester	divided between Bellechasse, Beauce-Nord and Beauce-Sud
Mégantic	divided between Lotbinière and Frontenac
Olier	divided between Viau, Jeanne-Mance and Bourassa
Rouville	divided between Iberville and Chambly
Reorganization of ridings
Compton; Frontenac; Wolfe	Frontenac; Mégantic-Compton
Merger of ridings
Brome; Missisquoi	Brome-Missisquoi
Gaspé-Nord; Gaspé-Sud	Gaspé
Joliette; Montcalm	Joliette-Montcalm
Kamouraska; Témiscouata	Kamouraska-Témiscouata
L'Islet; Montmagny	Montmagny-L'Islet
Nicolet; Yamaska	Nicolet-Yamaska
Pontiac; Témiscamingue	Pontiac-Témiscamingue
Division of ridings
Ahuntsic	Crémazie; L'Acadie
Beauce	Beauce-Nord; Beauce-Sud
Bourassa	Bourassa; Sauvé
Fabre	Fabre; Mille-Îles
Saint-Sauveur	Saint-Sauveur; Vanier
Renaming of ridings
Bagot	Johnson
Labelle	Laurentides-Labelle
Napierville-Laprairie	La Prairie
Stanstead	Orford

== Campaign ==
The Liberals, Unionists and péquistes all fielded full slates, while the créditistes failed to nominate a candidate only in Saint-Laurent (because a traffic accident prevented that candidate from presenting his nomination papers before the deadline), so virtually all constituencies experienced at least four-way contests:

Riding contests, by number of candidates (1973)
Candidates	Lib	PQ	UN	RC	Ind	M-L	Comm	Total
3	1	1	1					3
4	76	76	76	76				304
5	29	29	29	29	16	12	1	145
6	2	2	2	2	2	1	1	12
7	1	1	1	1	2	1		7
8	1	1	1	1	2	1	1	8
Total	110	110	110	109	22	15	3	479

== Results ==
Elections to the Legislative Assembly of Quebec (1973)
Political party	Party leader	MNAs				Votes			
Political party	Party leader	Candidates	1970	1973	±	#	±	%	± (pp)
Liberal	Robert Bourassa	110	72	102	30▲	1,623,734	319,393▲	54.65%	9.25▲
Parti Québécois	René Lévesque	110	7	6	1▼	897,809	235,405▲	30.22%	7.16▲
Parti créditiste (Note: 1973 results compared to 1970 Ralliement créditiste total)	Yvon Dupuis	109	12	2	10▼	294,706	26,664▼	9.92%	1.27▼
Union Nationale	Gabriel Loubier	110	17	–	17▼	146,209	418,335▼	4.92%	14.73▼
Independent		22	–	–	–	6,961	5,567▼	0.23%	0.21▼
Marxist–Leninist		15	–	–	–	1,395	1,395▲	0.05%	New
Communist	Sam Walsh	3	–	–	–	164	49▼	0.01%	–
Total		479	108	110		2,970,978		100.00%	
Rejected ballots						54,760	2,269▼		
Voter turnout						3,025,738	95,739▲	80.38	3.85▼
Registered electors						3,764,611	286,033▲		

=== Vote and seat summaries ===
Ternary plots - shift of electoral support (1970-1973)
1970

1973
Electoral districts identified by colours of winning parties

Seats and popular vote by party
Party	Seats	Votes	Change (pp)
█ Liberal	102 / 110	54.65%	9.25
█ Parti Québécois	6 / 110	30.22%	7.16
█ Parti créditiste	2 / 110	9.92%	-1.27
█ Union Nationale	0 / 110	4.92%	-14.73
█ Independent	0 / 110	0.23%	-0.21
█ Other	0 / 110	0.36%	-0.20

=== Synopsis of results ===
Results by riding - 1973 Quebec general election
Riding	Winning party						Turnout (Note: including spoilt ballots)	Votes							
Name	1970	Party	Votes	Share	Margin #	Margin %	Turnout	Lib	PQ	Cr	UN	Ind	ML	Comm	Total
Abitibi-Est	RC	Lib	12,696	50.75%	6,657	26.61%	65.38%	12,696	5,726	6,039	343	212	–	–	25,016
Abitibi-Ouest	RC	Lib	9,963	48.28%	2,712	13.14%	74.96%	9,963	2,804	7,251	513	106	–	–	20,637
Anjou	New	Lib	15,037	48.59%	828	2.68%	83.41%	15,037	14,209	1,278	425	–	–	–	30,949
Argenteuil	Lib	Lib	14,022	57.96%	8,811	36.42%	80.41%	14,022	3,730	5,211	766	465	–	–	24,194
Arthabaska	Lib	Lib	16,275	55.30%	9,458	32.14%	87.34%	16,275	4,994	6,817	1,342	–	–	–	29,428
Beauce-Nord	New	Lib	13,814	56.14%	9,469	38.48%	81.86%	13,814	4,345	4,293	2,153	–	–	–	24,605
Beauce-Sud	New	Cr	10,481	46.29%	7,688	33.96%	80.39%	9,586	1,898	10,481	676	–	–	–	22,641
Beauharnois	Lib	Lib	15,817	51.56%	3,685	12.01%	87.77%	15,817	12,132	1,727	1,002	–	–	–	30,678
Bellechasse	UN	Lib	9,206	44.30%	1,044	5.02%	77.99%	9,206	2,054	1,357	8,162	–	–	–	20,779
Berthier	UN	Lib	11,428	51.48%	6,570	29.60%	82.22%	11,428	4,858	2,988	2,923	–	–	–	22,197
Bonaventure	Lib	Lib	12,936	69.64%	9,482	51.04%	78.61%	12,936	3,454	821	1,365	–	–	–	18,576
Bourassa	Lib	Lib	15,822	53.81%	3,889	13.23%	81.44%	15,822	11,933	1,195	453	–	–	–	29,403
Bourget	PQ	Lib	13,916	46.94%	300	1.01%	83.63%	13,916	13,616	1,646	375	91	–	–	29,644
Brome-Missisquoi	New	Lib	12,999	62.02%	9,687	46.22%	78.27%	12,999	2,860	3,312	1,587	202	–	–	20,960
Chambly	Lib	Lib	19,005	56.55%	6,745	20.07%	86.44%	19,005	12,260	1,629	714	–	–	–	33,608
Champlain	Lib	Lib	14,698	54.91%	8,821	32.96%	82.79%	14,698	5,877	4,575	1,616	–	–	–	26,766
Charlesbourg	New	Lib	19,770	57.79%	8,172	23.89%	85.16%	19,770	11,598	1,964	876	–	–	–	34,208
Charlevoix	Lib	Lib	13,682	63.91%	9,982	46.63%	82.37%	13,682	3,700	3,265	760	–	–	–	21,407
Châteauguay	Lib	Lib	17,152	60.43%	8,095	28.52%	80.13%	17,152	9,057	1,432	743	–	–	–	28,384
Chauveau	Lib	Lib	18,510	55.22%	8,555	25.52%	83.07%	18,510	9,955	3,726	1,328	–	–	–	33,519
Chicoutimi	UN	PQ	12,359	42.14%	1,031	3.52%	83.86%	11,328	12,359	1,370	4,268	–	–	–	29,325
Crémazie	New	Lib	15,993	50.18%	1,396	4.38%	86.07%	15,993	14,597	783	450	–	50	–	31,873
D'Arcy-McGee	Lib	Lib	26,958	93.77%	25,737	89.52%	77.59%	26,958	1,221	418	152	–	–	–	28,749
Deux-Montagnes	Lib	Lib	15,732	59.18%	7,979	30.02%	83.17%	15,732	7,753	2,290	808	–	–	–	26,583
Dorion	Lib	Lib	13,649	47.68%	293	1.02%	79.27%	13,649	13,356	982	522	–	116	–	28,625
Drummond	Lib	Lib	14,781	46.84%	6,798	21.54%	86.11%	14,781	7,457	7,983	1,333	–	–	–	31,554
Dubuc	UN	Lib	11,042	50.43%	4,186	19.12%	81.90%	11,042	6,856	1,858	2,139	–	–	–	21,895
Duplessis	Lib	Lib	13,404	52.94%	2,481	9.80%	66.99%	13,404	10,923	504	416	–	70	–	25,317
Fabre	Lib	Lib	20,810	52.06%	3,753	9.39%	85.61%	20,810	17,057	1,558	545	–	–	–	39,970
Frontenac (Note: covers a virtually different area from the previous incarnation of Frontenac)	New	Lib	10,527	39.75%	4,274	16.14%	85.41%	10,527	6,253	3,882	5,820	–	–	–	26,482
Gaspé	New	Lib	13,004	62.25%	6,949	33.26%	75.67%	13,004	6,055	690	1,141	–	–	–	20,890
Gatineau	Lib	Lib	15,025	70.15%	11,638	54.33%	69.95%	15,025	3,387	2,184	823	–	–	–	21,419
Gouin	PQ	Lib	12,506	48.07%	636	2.44%	78.21%	12,506	11,870	1,078	560	–	–	–	26,014
Hull	Lib	Lib	15,325	57.08%	7,107	26.47%	68.99%	15,325	8,218	2,402	587	316	–	–	26,848
Huntingdon	Lib	Lib	11,328	58.54%	8,126	41.99%	79.76%	11,328	2,853	1,969	3,202	–	–	–	19,352
Iberville	UN	Lib	10,688	37.39%	2,429	8.50%	84.13%	10,688	5,373	8,259	4,132	134	–	–	28,586
Îles-de-la-Madeleine	Lib	Lib	3,839	60.87%	1,780	28.22%	82.62%	3,839	2,059	232	177	–	–	–	6,307
Jacques-Cartier	Lib	Lib	19,551	69.25%	12,657	44.83%	78.51%	19,551	6,894	1,082	705	–	–	–	28,232
Jean-Talon	Lib	Lib	18,708	64.89%	10,196	35.37%	84.50%	18,708	8,512	677	933	–	–	–	28,830
Jeanne-Mance	Lib	Lib	22,308	55.10%	5,835	14.41%	83.17%	22,308	16,473	1,074	632	–	–	–	40,487
Johnson (Note: formerly Bagot)	UN	Lib	10,543	48.20%	3,940	18.01%	82.05%	10,543	3,597	6,603	1,130	–	–	–	21,873
Joliette-Montcalm	New	Lib	18,010	55.61%	6,010	18.56%	84.70%	18,010	12,000	1,712	666	–	–	–	32,388
Jonquière	Lib	Lib	16,985	53.71%	4,135	13.08%	84.30%	16,985	12,850	892	897	–	–	–	31,624
Kamouraska-Témiscouata	New	Lib	10,617	51.97%	5,266	25.77%	72.81%	10,617	3,282	5,351	1,181	–	–	–	20,431
L'Acadie	New	Lib	20,354	66.39%	11,296	36.85%	83.59%	20,354	9,058	670	488	–	86	–	30,656
L'Assomption	Lib	Lib	16,806	48.58%	1,683	4.86%	85.40%	16,806	15,123	2,094	572	–	–	–	34,595
Lac-Saint-Jean	Lib	Lib	12,554	50.70%	3,337	13.48%	85.23%	12,554	9,217	1,545	1,378	68	–	–	24,762
LaFontaine	PQ	PQ	14,866	50.18%	2,308	7.79%	83.27%	12,558	14,866	1,725	476	–	–	–	29,625
Laporte	New	Lib	17,427	47.14%	372	1.01%	81.76%	17,427	17,055	1,846	641	–	–	–	36,969
La Prairie (Note: formerly Napierville-Laprairie)	Lib	Lib	23,723	63.13%	12,294	32.72%	83.66%	23,723	11,429	1,757	667	–	–	–	37,576
Laurentides-Labelle (Note: formerly Labelle)	UN	Lib	10,000	41.73%	2,388	9.97%	80.70%	10,000	7,612	3,486	2,864	–	–	–	23,962
Laurier	Lib	Lib	17,889	64.81%	9,519	34.49%	78.87%	17,889	8,370	836	507	–	–	–	27,602
Laval	Lib	Lib	21,676	64.56%	11,673	34.77%	83.33%	21,676	10,003	1,386	511	–	–	–	33,576
Laviolette	Lib	Lib	11,800	46.28%	4,765	18.69%	82.88%	11,800	7,035	4,584	2,076	–	–	–	25,495
Lévis	RC	Lib	16,534	54.73%	7,450	24.66%	85.61%	16,534	9,084	3,177	1,416	–	–	–	30,211
Limoilou	Lib	Lib	16,140	53.86%	5,749	19.19%	81.32%	16,140	10,391	1,944	1,428	–	61	–	29,964
Lotbinière	RC	Lib	9,907	48.11%	3,744	18.18%	81.41%	9,907	2,318	6,163	2,204	–	–	–	20,592
Louis-Hébert	Lib	Lib	17,583	49.01%	777	2.17%	84.91%	17,583	16,806	735	702	–	50	–	35,876
Maisonneuve	PQ	PQ	12,198	50.97%	2,276	9.51%	75.34%	9,922	12,198	1,215	413	147	38	–	23,933
Marguerite-Bourgeoys	Lib	Lib	23,848	66.50%	13,700	38.20%	80.40%	23,848	10,148	1,137	488	242	–	–	35,863
Maskinongé	UN	Lib	10,610	48.81%	5,276	24.27%	83.82%	10,610	3,594	2,198	5,334	–	–	–	21,736
Matane	Lib	Lib	10,102	49.58%	2,650	13.01%	76.99%	10,102	7,452	2,126	694	–	–	–	20,374
Matapédia	Lib	Lib	7,564	42.81%	2,459	13.92%	76.02%	7,564	5,105	3,092	1,906	–	–	–	17,667
Mégantic-Compton	New	Lib	9,815	47.96%	4,430	21.65%	79.01%	9,815	2,819	5,385	2,445	–	–	–	20,464
Mercier	Lib	Lib	13,757	52.87%	2,880	11.07%	75.07%	13,757	10,877	809	411	71	70	23	26,018
Mille-Îles	New	Lib	19,809	49.52%	2,188	5.47%	86.61%	19,809	17,621	1,954	616	–	–	–	40,000
Mont-Royal	New	Lib	23,780	83.21%	19,813	69.33%	78.45%	23,780	3,967	457	373	–	–	–	28,577
Montmagny-L'Islet	New	Lib	11,375	51.88%	5,588	25.48%	76.03%	11,375	2,538	2,227	5,787	–	–	–	21,927
Montmorency	Lib	Lib	15,248	51.89%	5,973	20.33%	84.52%	15,248	9,275	3,863	999	–	–	–	29,385
Nicolet-Yamaska	New	Lib	11,126	49.07%	4,789	21.12%	84.17%	11,126	3,233	1,978	6,337	–	–	–	22,674
Notre-Dame-de-Grâce	Lib	Lib	23,263	81.64%	19,613	68.83%	77.70%	23,263	3,650	1,156	424	–	–	–	28,493
Orford (Note: formerly Stanstead)	Lib	Lib	13,924	63.08%	10,127	45.88%	81.23%	13,924	3,797	3,574	777	–	–	–	22,072
Outremont	Lib	Lib	17,262	62.84%	8,145	29.65%	77.42%	17,262	9,117	499	421	–	169	–	27,468
Papineau	Lib	Lib	16,610	61.22%	10,254	37.79%	72.49%	16,610	6,356	3,482	683	–	–	–	27,131
Pointe-Claire	New	Lib	26,871	87.90%	24,316	79.54%	78.40%	26,871	2,555	859	285	–	–	–	30,570
Pontiac-Témiscamingue	New	Lib	10,269	61.39%	6,576	39.31%	69.84%	10,269	1,392	3,693	1,373	–	–	–	16,727
Portneuf	RC	Lib	12,638	53.14%	6,555	27.56%	85.43%	12,638	4,067	6,083	993	–	–	–	23,781
Prévost	New	Lib	15,805	48.48%	3,938	12.08%	80.64%	15,805	11,867	3,726	1,022	105	–	73	32,598
Richelieu	Lib	Lib	15,198	55.21%	5,734	20.83%	87.23%	15,198	9,464	2,017	848	–	–	–	27,527
Richmond	RC	Lib	7,569	40.70%	355	1.91%	82.28%	7,569	3,130	7,214	686	–	–	–	18,599
Rimouski	Lib	Lib	13,268	50.92%	4,518	17.34%	82.19%	13,268	8,750	3,307	730	–	–	–	26,055
Rivière-du-Loup	Lib	Lib	10,827	50.41%	6,079	28.30%	79.21%	10,827	3,773	4,748	2,129	–	–	–	21,477
Robert-Baldwin	Lib	Lib	26,189	81.03%	21,106	65.30%	81.36%	26,189	5,083	701	293	–	55	–	32,321
Roberval	Lib	Lib	13,737	53.06%	7,661	29.59%	79.58%	13,737	6,076	4,689	1,388	–	–	–	25,890
Rosemont	New	Lib	15,002	50.65%	2,015	6.80%	81.45%	15,002	12,987	1,070	560	–	–	–	29,619
Rouyn-Noranda	RC	Cr	9,227	42.80%	4,380	20.32%	77.49%	8,195	3,815	9,227	322	–	–	–	21,559
Saguenay	PQ	PQ	10,226	51.14%	2,293	11.47%	72.20%	7,933	10,226	1,404	327	105	–	–	19,995
Saint-François	New	Lib	12,519	53.38%	5,679	24.22%	80.26%	12,519	6,840	2,885	1,208	–	–	–	23,452
Saint-Henri	Lib	Lib	14,877	52.72%	3,548	12.57%	78.33%	14,877	11,329	1,248	625	–	141	–	28,220
Saint-Hyacinthe	Lib	Lib	13,325	48.29%	5,535	20.06%	83.69%	13,325	7,790	4,707	1,771	–	–	–	27,593
Saint-Jacques	PQ	PQ	11,312	51.58%	2,465	11.24%	68.84%	8,847	11,312	1,039	654	79	–	–	21,931
Saint-Jean	Lib	Lib	12,904	45.48%	4,678	16.49%	86.65%	12,904	8,226	6,588 (Note: Yvon Dupuis had also been previously elected to the Legislative Assembly in 1952 for Montréal–Sainte-Marie)	656	–	–	–	28,374
Saint-Laurent	Lib	Lib	21,246	74.02%	14,312	49.86%	78.89%	21,246	6,934	–	522	–	–	–	28,702
Saint-Louis	Lib	Lib	14,095	63.34%	7,382	33.17%	61.30%	14,095	6,713	738	541	–	167	–	22,254
Saint-Maurice	UN	Lib	8,865	34.12%	1,414	5.44%	85.28%	8,865	7,451	2,230	7,433	–	–	–	25,979
Saint-Anne	Lib	Lib	12,755	54.92%	5,276	22.72%	71.10%	12,755	7,479	968	278	1,641	104	–	23,225
Sainte-Marie	PQ	Lib	10,958	46.15%	48	0.20%	75.90%	10,958	10,910	1,064	694	–	116	–	23,742
Sauvé	New	PQ	18,235	51.01%	2,760	7.72%	80.97%	15,475	18,235	1,491	499	47	–	–	35,747
Shefford	UN	Lib	10,775	39.73%	3,528	13.01%	84.16%	10,775	4,633	7,247	4,467	–	–	–	27,122
Sherbrooke	Lib	Lib	15,117	52.38%	6,082	21.07%	80.87%	15,117	9,035	3,042	1,667	–	–	–	28,861
Taillon	Lib	Lib	18,346	46.67%	577	1.47%	78.88%	18,346	17,769	2,546	550	103	–	–	39,314
Taschereau	New	Lib	11,714	51.94%	4,750	21.06%	73.79%	11,714	6,964	2,334	1,438	–	102	–	22,552
Terrebonne	Lib	Lib	17,255	52.52%	3,984	12.13%	85.67%	17,255	13,271	1,829	431	–	–	68	32,854
Trois-Rivières	Lib	Lib	16,714	57.57%	8,007	27.58%	78.80%	16,714	8,707	1,865	1,746	–	–	–	29,032
Vanier	New	Lib	16,410	53.73%	6,183	20.25%	81.19%	16,410	10,227	2,199	1,164	539	–	–	30,539
Vaudreuil-Soulanges	Lib	Lib	14,563	56.88%	7,551	29.49%	82.53%	14,563	7,012	3,010	1,017	–	–	–	25,602
Verchères	Lib	Lib	14,315	52.90%	5,306	19.61%	85.09%	14,315	9,009	2,418	1,317	–	–	–	27,059
Verdun	Lib	Lib	19,439	67.25%	11,496	39.77%	80.23%	19,439	7,943	1,109	415	–	–	–	28,906
Viau	New	Lib	16,404	56.67%	5,600	19.35%	78.93%	16,404	10,804	1,069	525	142	–	–	28,944
Westmount	Lib	Lib	21,354	76.92%	17,752	63.95%	75.78%	21,354	3,602	402	256	2,146	–	–	27,760

= open seat
= turnout is above provincial average
= winning candidate was in previous Legislature
= incumbent had switched allegiance
= previously incumbent in another riding
= not incumbent; was previously elected to the Legislature
= incumbency arose from byelection gain
= other incumbents renominated
= previously an MP in the House of Commons of Canada
= multiple candidates

=== Analysis ===
Party candidates in 2nd place
Party in 1st place	Party in 2nd place				Total
Party in 1st place	Lib	PQ	Cr	UN	Total
Liberal		81	16	5	102
Parti Québécois	6				6
Parti créditiste	2				2
Total	8	81	16	5	110

Candidates ranked 1st to 5th place, by party
Parties	1st	2nd	3rd	4th	5th
█ Liberal	102	8			
█ Parti Québécois	6	81	23		
█ Parti créditiste	2	16	76	15	
█ Union Nationale		5	9	94	2
█ Independent			2		17
█ Marxist–Leninist					13
█ Communist					1

Resulting composition of the 28th Quebec Legislative Assembly
Source		Party			
Source		Lib	PQ	Cr	Total
Seats retained	Incumbents returned	48	4	1	53
Seats retained	Open seats held - taken by incumbents from other ridings	2			2
Seats retained	Open seats held - new MNAs	10			10
Seats changing hands	Incumbents defeated	17	1		18
Seats changing hands	Open seats gained	1			1
New ridings	Previous incumbents from other ridings	13		1	14
New ridings	New MNAs	11	1		12
Total		102	6	2	110

== See also ==
- List of Quebec premiers
- Politics of Quebec
- Timeline of Quebec history
- List of Quebec political parties
- 30th National Assembly of Quebec
