= Kenneth Fraser =

Australian surgeon and soldier

Brigadier Sir Kenneth Barron Fraser, CBE, FRACS (28 March 1897 – 24 June 1969) was an Australian surgeon and soldier.

== Biography ==
Born on 28 March 1897 in Hughenden, Queensland, Fraser was the eldest child of Hugh Barron Fraser, an English-born civil servant, and his Australian wife Clara Emma, née Jones. He attended Brisbane Grammar School, before studying medicine at the University of Queensland; he transferred after a year to St Andrew's College of the University of Sydney and graduated in 1921 with Bachelor of Medicine, Bachelor of Surgery degrees (MB, ChM).

Fraser spent a year as resident medical officer at Royal Prince Alfred Hospital in Sydney. In 1923, he became a general practitioner in Brisbane and took up a part-time post at the city's Children's Hospital. In 1938 he became a lecturer in paediatric surgery at the University of Queensland and was awarded a Master of Surgery degree in 1940. He remained at the Children's Hospital until 1957. In the meantime, he served in the Citizen Military Forces from 1923 as a captain in the Royal Australian Army Medical Corps. From 1934 to 1935 and 1936 to 1939 he commanded the 7th Field Ambulance and secured promotion to lieutenant-colonel in 1935. Serving in the Australian Imperial Force during the Second World War, he commanded the 2nd and 3rd Field Ambulances in the United Kingdom from 1940 with the rank of colonel and was posted as assistant director of medical services for the Australian Imperial Force in the United Kingdom. He went on to command the 2nd Australian General Hospital in the Middle East (1941–42) and returned to Australia as deputy director of medical services for Queensland Lines of Communication Areas, serving until 1954. In 1955, he was promoted to honorary brigadier.

With the war over, he focused on his former practice and campaigned for a chair of paediatrics at the University of Queensland. He was president of British Medical Association's Queensland Branch (1952) and of the Australian Paediatrics Association (1958–59), as well as a fellow of the Royal Australasian College of Surgeons. He was appointed a Commander of the Order of the British Empire in 1953, a Knight Bachelor in 1958 and a Knight of the Order of St John the following year. He died on 24 June 1969 and was survived by his wife, Edith Mary Patricia Lloyd née Hart (whom he had married in 1929), and their two sons and two daughters.
