= Rouyn-Noranda (electoral district) =

Coordinates: 48.300°N 79.044°W

Quebec electoral district

Defunct provincial electoral district
- Legislature: National Assembly of Quebec
- District created: 1944
- District abolished: 1980
- First contested: 1944
- Last contested: 1976

Rouyn-Noranda (French pronunciation: [ʁwɛ̃ nɔʁɑ̃da]) was a former provincial electoral district in the Abitibi-Témiscamingue region of Quebec, Canada, which elected members to the National Assembly of Quebec (known as the Legislative Assembly of Quebec until December 1968). It was located in and around the city of Rouyn-Noranda.

It was created for the 1944 election from parts of the now-defunct Témiscamingue electoral district. Its final election was in 1976. It disappeared in the 1981 election and its successor electoral district was Rouyn-Noranda–Témiscamingue.

== Members of the Legislative Assembly / National Assembly ==
Legislature	Years	Member	Party
Riding created from Témiscamingue
22nd	1944–1945	David Côté	Co-operative Commonwealth
22nd	1945–1948	David Côté	Independent
23rd	1948–1952	Guy Dallaire	Union Nationale
24th	1952–1956	Guy Dallaire	Union Nationale
25th	1956–1960	Edgar Turpin	Liberal
26th	1960–1962	Edgar Turpin	Liberal
27th	1962–1966	Edgar Turpin	Liberal
28th	1966–1969	Antonio Flamand	Union Nationale
28th	1969–1970	Antonio Flamand	Independent
29th	1970–1973	Camil Samson	Ralliement créditiste
30th	1973–1976	Camil Samson	Ralliement créditiste
31st	1976–1980	Camil Samson	Ralliement créditiste
31st	1980–1981	Camil Samson	Liberal
Dissolved into Rouyn-Noranda–Témiscamingue
