= Saint-Louis (provincial electoral district) =

Coordinates: 45.494°N 73.578°W

Quebec electoral district

Defunct provincial electoral district
- Legislature: National Assembly of Quebec
- District created: 1965
- District abolished: 1992
- First contested: 1966
- Last contested: 1989

Demographics
- Census division: Montreal (part)
- Census subdivision: Montreal (part)

Saint-Louis (French pronunciation: [sɛ̃ lwi]) was a provincial electoral district in the Montreal region of Quebec, Canada.

It corresponded to the western half of Ville-Marie (downtown Montreal).

It was created for the 1966 election from parts of Montréal–Saint-Louis, Montréal-Outremont and Montréal-Mercier electoral districts. Its final election was in 1989. It disappeared in the 1994 election and its successor electoral district was Westmount–Saint-Louis.

== Members of the Legislative Assembly / National Assembly ==
| Legislature | Years | Member | Party |
|---|---|---|---|
Riding created from Montréal–Saint-Louis, Montréal-Outremont and Montréal-Mercier
| 28th | 1966–1970 | Harry Blank | Liberal |
| 29th | 1970–1973 | Harry Blank | Liberal |
| 30th | 1973–1976 | Harry Blank | Liberal |
| 31st | 1976–1981 | Harry Blank | Liberal |
| 32nd | 1981–1985 | Harry Blank | Liberal |
| 33rd | 1985–1989 | Jacques Chagnon | Liberal |
| 34th | 1989–1994 | Jacques Chagnon | Liberal |
Dissolved into Westmount–Saint-Louis
