= Saint-Henri (provincial electoral district) =

Former provincial electoral district in Quebec, Canada

Coordinates: 45.476°N 73.585°W

Quebec electoral district

Defunct provincial electoral district
- Legislature: National Assembly of Quebec
- District created: 1965
- District abolished: 1992
- First contested: 1966
- Last contested: 1989

Demographics
- Census division(s): Montreal (part)
- Census subdivision(s): Montreal (part)

Saint-Henri (French pronunciation: [sɛ̃ ɑ̃ʁi]) was a provincial electoral district in the Montreal region of Quebec, Canada.

It corresponded to Saint-Henri neighbourhood and surrounding area in Montreal.

It was created for the 1966 election from part of Montréal–Saint-Henri. Its final election was in 1989. It disappeared in the 1994 election and its successor electoral district was Saint-Henri–Sainte-Anne.

== Members of the Legislative Assembly / National Assembly ==
Legislature	Years	Member	Party
Riding created from Montréal–Saint-Henri
28th	1966–1970	Camille Martellani	Union Nationale
29th	1970–1973	Gerard Shanks	Liberal
30th	1973–1976	Gerard Shanks	Liberal
31st	1976–1981	Jacques Couture	Parti Québécois
32nd	1981–1985	Roma Hains	Liberal
33rd	1985–1989	Roma Hains	Liberal
34th	1989–1994	Nicole Loiselle	Liberal
Dissolved into Saint-Henri–Sainte-Anne
