= Aimé Brisson =

Canadian politician (1928–2023)

Member of the National Assembly of Quebec for Jeanne-Mance
- In office 1962–1976
- Preceded by: Maurice Custeau
- Succeeded by: Henri Laberge

Personal details
- Born: September 13, 1928 Montreal, Quebec, Canada
- Died: February 12, 2023 (aged 94) Laval, Quebec, Canada
- Party: Quebec Liberal Party
- Profession: Accountant

Aimé Brisson (September 13, 1928 – February 12, 2023) was a Canadian politician in the province of Quebec.

Brisson was born in Montreal on September 13, 1928, and attended primary schooling there before attending HEC Montréal. He joined the Canadian Institute of Chartered Accountants in 1952. Brisson was a Liberal member of the National Assembly of Quebec for Jeanne-Mance from 1962 until his defeat in the 1976 election. He died in Laval on February 12, 2023, at the age of 94.
