= Ahuntsic (provincial electoral district) =

Coordinates: 45.55°N 73.67°W

Quebec electoral district

Defunct provincial electoral district
- Legislature: National Assembly of Quebec
- District created: 1965
- District abolished: 1972
- First contested: 1966
- Last contested: 1970

Ahuntsic (pronounced [aɔntsɪk]) was a provincial electoral district in Quebec, Canada, which elected a member to the National Assembly of Quebec (known as the Legislative Assembly of Quebec until December 1968). It was located in and around the Ahuntsic district of Montreal.

It was created for the 1966 election from parts of the now-defunct Laval district. Its final election was in 1970. It disappeared in the 1973 election and its successor electoral districts were Crémazie and L'Acadie.

== Members of the Legislative Assembly / National Assembly ==
- Jean-Paul Lefebvre, Liberal (1966–1970)
- François Cloutier, Liberal (1970–1973)
