= 1970 Quebec general election =

Canadian provincial election

- April 29, 1970

108 seats in the 29th National Assembly of Quebec 55 seats were needed for a majority
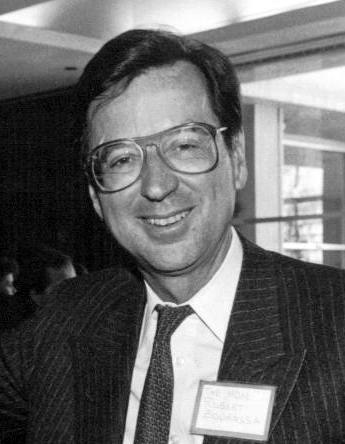

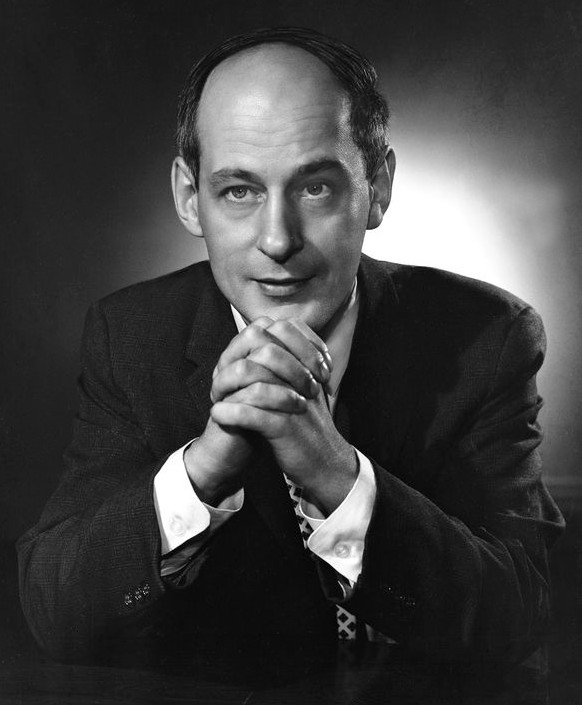
	First party	Second party
Leader	Robert Bourassa	Jean-Jacques Bertrand
Party	Liberal	Union Nationale
Leader since	January 17, 1970	October 2, 1968
Leader's seat	Mercier	Missisquoi
Last election	50 seats, 47.29%	56 seats, 40.82%
Seats won	72	17
Seat change	▲22	▼39
Popular vote	1,304,341	564,544
Percentage	45.40%	19.65%
Swing	▼1.9%	▼21.17%
	Third party	Fourth party
	PC
Leader	Camil Samson	René Lévesque
Party	Parti créditiste	Parti Québécois
Leader since	March 22, 1970	October 14, 1968
Leader's seat	Rouyn-Noranda	Laurier (lost re-election)
Last election	pre-creation	pre-creation
Seats won	12	7
Seat change	▲12	▲7
Popular vote	321,370	662,404
Percentage	11.19%	23.06%
Swing	▲11.19%	▲23.06
Premier before election
Jean-Jacques Bertrand
Union Nationale
Premier after election
Robert Bourassa
Liberal

The 1970 Quebec general election was held on April 29, 1970, to elect members of the National Assembly of Quebec. The former Legislative Assembly had been renamed the "National Assembly" in 1968, with its members now known in English as Members of the National Assembly (MNAs).

In the election, the Quebec Liberal Party, led by Robert Bourassa, defeated the incumbent Union Nationale, led by Premier Jean-Jacques Bertrand.

This election marked the first appearance by a new party, the sovereigntist Parti Québécois, led by former Liberal cabinet minister René Lévesque. The PQ won a modest seven seats and came second in the popular vote, although Lévesque was defeated in his own riding.

Only a few months after the election, Quebec faced a severe test with the October Crisis, in which Liberal cabinet minister Pierre Laporte was kidnapped and assassinated by the Front de libération du Québec, a violent pro-independence group.

The Union Nationale, which had governed Quebec through most of the 1940s and 1950s, would never come close to winning power again. This was partly because a significant number of the Union Nationale's younger supporters had embraced sovereigntism and shifted their support to the PQ.

== Campaign ==
The Liberals, Unionists and péquistes all fielded full slates, and the créditistes also nominated 99 candidates, so most constituencies experienced at least four-way contests:

Riding contests, by number of candidates (1970)
Candidates	Lib	UN	PQ	RC	Ind	NDP	I-PQ	I-Cr	Comm	Soc-W	Total
3	4	4	4								12
4	76	76	76	74		2					304
5	21	21	21	18	14	7		1	1	1	105
6	4	4	4	4	6	2					24
7	3	3	3	3	6	2	1				21
Total	108	108	108	99	26	13	1	1	1	1	466

== Results ==
Elections to the Legislative Assembly of Quebec (1970)
Political party	Party leader	MNAs				Votes			
Political party	Party leader	Candidates	1966	1970	±	#	±	%	± (pp)
Liberal	Robert Bourassa	108	50	72	22▲	1,304,341	204,906▲	45.40%	1.89▼
Union Nationale	Jean-Jacques Bertrand	108	56	17	39▼	564,544	384,384▼	19.65%	21.17▼
Ralliement créditiste	Camil Samson	99	–	12	12▲	321,370	321,370▲	11.19%	New
Parti Québécois (Note: 1970 results compared to 1966 combined RIN/RN total)	René Lévesque	108	–	7	7▲	662,404	458,689▲	23.06%	14.30▲
Independent		26	2	–	2▼	12,528	51,906▼	0.44%	2.33▼
Other candidates									
█ New Democratic	Roland Morin	13	–	–	–	4,374	4,374▲	0.15%	New
█ Independent PQ		1	–	–	–	2,998	2,998▲	0.10%	New
█ Independent Créditiste		1	–	–	–	53	53▲	–	New
█ Communist	Sam Walsh	1	–	–	–	213	289▼	0.01%	0.01▼
█ Socialist Workers		1	–	–	–	145	145▲	0.01%	New
Total		466	108	108		2,872,970		100.00%	
Rejected ballots						57,029	11,348▲		
Voter turnout						2,929,999	559,489▲	84.23	10.66▲
Registered electors						3,478,578	256,276▲		

=== Vote and seat summaries ===
Ternary plots - shift of electoral support (1966-1970)
1966

1970
Electoral districts identified by colours of winning parties

Seats and popular vote by party
Party	Seats	Votes	Change (pp)
█ Liberal	72 / 108	45.40%	-1.89
█ Union Nationale	17 / 108	19.65%	-21.17
█ Ralliement créditiste	12 / 108	11.19%	11.19
█ Parti Québécois	7 / 108	23.06%	14.30
█ Independent	0 / 108	0.44%	-2.33
█ Other	0 / 108	0.36%	-0.10

=== Synopsis of results ===
Results by riding - 1970 Quebec general election
Riding	Winning party						Turnout (Note: including spoilt ballots)	Votes							
Name	1966	Party	Votes	Share	Margin #	Margin %	Turnout	Lib	PQ	UN	RC	Ind	NDP	Other	Total
Abitibi-Est	Lib	RC	15,151	43.11%	4,320	12.29%	81.95%	10,831	4,937	4,224	15,151	–	–	–	35,143
Abitibi-Ouest	Lib	RC	6,285	46.52%	1,602	11.86%	87.66%	4,683	917	1,626	6,285	–	–	–	13,511
Ahuntsic	Lib	Lib	17,208	45.53%	972	2.57%	87.68%	17,208	16,236	3,760	588	–	–	–	37,792
Argenteuil	Lib	Lib	9,620	57.98%	5,656	34.09%	86.93%	9,620	1,563	3,964	1,345	99	–	–	16,591
Arthabaska	UN	Lib	8,715	32.13%	263	0.97%	89.88%	8,715	3,852	5,983	8,452	119	–	–	27,121
Bagot	UN	UN	4,591	37.74%	1,250	10.27%	89.29%	3,341	917	4,591	3,280	37	–	–	12,166
Beauce	UN	RC	11,804	38.45%	2,444	7.96%	84.37%	8,139	1,393	9,360	11,804	–	–	–	30,696
Beauharnois	Lib	Lib	12,384	43.00%	2,937	10.20%	89.87%	12,384	9,447	5,515	1,453	–	–	–	28,799
Bellechasse	UN	UN	6,111	50.56%	3,043	25.18%	85.73%	3,068	311	6,111	2,596	–	–	–	12,086
Berthier	UN	UN	5,387	37.72%	164	1.15%	86.29%	5,223	2,866	5,387	807	–	–	–	14,283
Bonaventure	Lib	Lib	11,803	60.39%	6,729	34.43%	83.93%	11,803	2,155	5,074	513	–	–	–	19,545
Bourassa	Lib	Lib	22,197	45.59%	1,371	2.82%	80.48%	22,197	20,826	4,265	1,401	–	–	–	48,689
Bourget	UN	PQ	15,565	40.25%	500	1.29%	85.65%	15,065	15,565	6,689	1,246	–	108	–	38,673
Brome	Lib	Lib	4,666	63.21%	3,036	41.13%	85.54%	4,666	299	1,630	787	–	–	–	7,382
Chambly	Lib	Lib	25,641	56.74%	11,273	24.95%	87.41%	25,641	14,368	3,948	1,231	–	–	–	45,188
Champlain	UN	Lib	9,334	33.06%	2,534	8.98%	86.96%	9,334	5,403	6,800	6,696	–	–	–	28,233
Charlevoix	Lib	Lib	6,602	42.59%	2,439	15.73%	85.40%	6,602	1,680	4,163	3,058	–	–	–	15,503
Châteauguay	Lib	Lib	14,536	59.53%	10,013	41.00%	87.31%	14,536	4,493	4,523	867	–	–	–	24,419
Chauveau	UN	Lib	18,469	36.61%	5,121	10.15%	85.94%	18,469	9,399	9,235	13,348	–	–	–	50,451
Chicoutimi	UN	UN	8,614	36.74%	1,283	5.47%	87.80%	7,331	7,090	8,614	409	–	–	–	23,444
Compton	UN	Lib	3,613	32.09%	270	2.40%	86.94%	3,613	1,030	3,274	3,343	–	–	–	11,260
D'Arcy-McGee	Lib	Lib	36,543	90.41%	33,313	82.42%	85.06%	36,543	3,230	647	–	–	–	–	40,420
Deux-Montagnes	Lib	Lib	12,106	54.21%	6,949	31.12%	87.86%	12,106	4,199	5,157	870	–	–	–	22,332
Dorchester	UN	RC	6,067	35.30%	1,684	9.80%	78.84%	4,383	2,490	4,245	6,067	–	–	–	17,185
Dorion	Lib	Lib	13,183	45.94%	3,525	12.28%	78.67%	13,183	9,658	4,851	859	–	–	145	28,696
Drummond	Lib	Lib	13,269	40.16%	5,420	16.41%	87.87%	13,269	6,888	5,032	7,849	–	–	–	33,038
Dubuc	UN	UN	8,793	36.19%	440	1.81%	88.20%	8,353	6,505	8,793	647	–	–	–	24,298
Duplessis	Lib	Lib	7,839	45.86%	2,227	13.03%	80.70%	7,839	5,612	3,310	331	–	–	–	17,092
Fabre	Lib	Lib	20,158	41.71%	91	0.19%	87.17%	20,158	20,067	6,213	1,613	92	182	–	48,325
Frontenac	UN	RC	5,204	38.74%	483	3.60%	84.13%	2,604	840	4,721	5,204	65	–	–	13,434
Gaspé-Nord	UN	UN	4,786	41.60%	194	1.69%	88.52%	4,592	1,990	4,786	136	–	–	–	11,504
Gaspé-Sud	Lib	Lib	8,455	49.96%	3,370	19.91%	84.06%	8,455	3,062	5,085	322	–	–	–	16,924
Gatineau	Lib	Lib	19,007	62.37%	13,886	45.56%	82.58%	19,007	3,360	5,121	2,989	–	–	–	30,477
Gouin	Lib	PQ	14,070	40.87%	12	0.03%	78.87%	14,058	14,070	5,053	1,242	–	–	–	34,423
Hull	Lib	Lib	14,478	56.97%	10,664	41.96%	75.63%	14,478	3,814	3,647	3,252	221	–	–	25,412
Huntingdon	Lib	Lib	4,170	55.44%	1,742	23.16%	80.39%	4,170	611	2,428	312	–	–	–	7,521
Iberville	UN	UN	4,110	40.17%	768	7.51%	90.07%	3,342	2,036	4,110	743	–	–	–	10,231
Îles-de-la-Madeleine	Lib	Lib	3,560	56.68%	1,275	20.30%	89.57%	3,560	366	2,285	70	–	–	–	6,281
Jacques-Cartier	Lib	Lib	25,743	67.16%	19,427	50.68%	84.72%	25,743	6,316	3,027	922	2,322	–	–	38,330
Jean-Talon	Lib	Lib	12,565	41.63%	6,068	20.10%	82.07%	12,565	6,497	6,381	4,625	114	–	–	30,182
Jeanne-Mance	Lib	Lib	21,515	48.48%	4,649	10.48%	83.81%	21,515	16,866	4,797	1,197	–	–	–	44,375
Joliette	UN	Lib	10,929	40.32%	3,235	11.93%	88.66%	10,929	7,376	7,694	1,107	–	–	–	27,106
Jonquière	Lib	Lib	15,010	49.49%	3,656	12.05%	88.64%	15,010	11,354	3,108	856	–	–	–	30,328
Kamouraska	UN	Lib	4,889	37.73%	1,136	8.77%	80.89%	4,889	762	3,555	3,753	–	–	–	12,959
L'Assomption	UN	Lib	10,754	38.30%	1,382	4.92%	87.16%	10,754	9,372	7,955	–	–	–	–	28,081
L'Islet	UN	Lib	4,000	35.99%	292	2.63%	82.20%	4,000	506	3,708	2,899	–	–	–	11,113
Labelle	UN	UN	6,263	46.41%	3,341	24.76%	84.83%	2,922	2,724	6,263	1,585	–	–	–	13,494
Lac-Saint-Jean	UN	Lib	9,339	39.76%	1,466	6.24%	89.23%	9,339	7,873	5,515	761	–	–	–	23,488
LaFontaine	UN	PQ	18,113	40.69%	2,611	5.87%	83.96%	15,502	18,113	8,948	1,731	89	128	–	44,511
Laurier	Lib	Lib	17,934	50.20%	4,331	12.12%	83.25%	17,934	13,603	3,073	1,113	–	–	–	35,723
Laval	Lib	Lib	27,262	57.64%	14,086	29.78%	84.28%	27,262	13,176	5,353	1,507	–	–	–	47,298
Laviolette	UN	Lib	6,974	28.57%	297	1.22%	85.20%	6,974	5,365	5,390	6,677	–	–	–	24,406
Lévis	UN	RC	10,268	31.14%	209	0.63%	87.54%	10,059	4,470	8,179	10,268	–	–	–	32,976
Limoilou	UN	Lib	12,582	32.78%	2,807	7.31%	84.07%	12,582	7,381	9,775	8,650	–	–	–	38,388
Lotbinière	UN	RC	4,823	35.83%	369	2.74%	87.19%	4,454	504	3,678	4,823	–	–	–	13,459
Louis-Hébert	Lib	Lib	25,026	54.09%	13,471	29.12%	87.49%	25,026	11,555	6,949	2,738	–	–	–	46,268
Maisonneuve	UN	PQ	16,012	45.16%	4,605	12.99%	77.18%	11,407	16,012	6,007	1,777	–	252	–	35,455
Marguerite-Bourgeoys	Lib	Lib	28,694	68.85%	20,787	49.88%	84.41%	28,694	7,907	3,584	850	262	378	–	41,675
Maskinongé	UN	UN	5,113	43.06%	1,299	10.94%	90.46%	3,814	757	5,113	2,190	–	–	–	11,874
Matane	Lib	Lib	8,800	41.67%	2,922	13.84%	84.93%	8,800	5,878	5,338	1,103	–	–	–	21,119
Matapédia	Lib	Lib	4,319	32.69%	514	3.89%	84.84%	4,319	3,805	2,564	871	1,655	–	–	13,214
Mégantic	UN	RC	8,201	28.79%	501	1.76%	88.09%	6,954	5,626	7,700	8,201	–	–	–	28,481
Mercier	Lib	Lib	15,337	46.65%	3,061	9.31%	79.82%	15,337	12,276	4,145	1,011	106	–	–	32,875
Missisquoi	UN	UN	6,789	40.22%	543	3.22%	84.60%	6,246	2,042	6,789	1,804	–	–	–	16,881
Montcalm	UN	UN	4,950	45.27%	338	3.09%	86.66%	4,612	1,372	4,950	–	–	–	–	10,934
Montmagny	UN	UN	5,596	42.54%	1,932	14.69%	82.25%	3,664	634	5,596	3,261	–	–	–	13,155
Montmorency	UN	Lib	9,714	32.65%	41	0.14%	87.35%	9,714	3,729	6,337	9,673	300	–	–	29,753
Napierville-Laprairie	Lib	Lib	14,408	48.71%	7,394	25.00%	80.74%	14,408	7,014	6,739	1,194	225	–	–	29,580
Nicolet	UN	UN	7,380	45.53%	1,819	11.22%	88.21%	5,561	1,764	7,380	1,505	–	–	–	16,210
Notre-Dame-de-Grâce	Lib	Lib	31,930	87.26%	29,147	79.65%	84.04%	31,930	2,783	680	357	–	843	–	36,593
Olier	Lib	Lib	22,649	50.38%	5,958	13.25%	81.52%	22,649	16,691	3,994	1,624	–	–	–	44,958
Outremont	Lib	Lib	25,955	74.21%	18,660	53.35%	86.42%	25,955	7,295	1,419	–	–	307	–	34,976
Papineau	UN	Lib	12,651	43.23%	3,648	12.47%	84.92%	12,651	2,634	9,003	4,974	–	–	–	29,262
Pontiac	UN	Lib	5,152	53.46%	1,162	12.06%	81.00%	5,152	253	3,990	242	–	–	–	9,637
Portneuf	UN	RC	11,086	38.14%	3,105	10.68%	83.82%	7,981	3,681	6,315	11,086	–	–	–	29,063
Richelieu	UN	Lib	12,047	42.01%	2,228	7.77%	89.02%	12,047	5,866	9,819	947	–	–	–	28,679
Richmond	Lib	RC	7,485	36.02%	1,137	5.47%	86.70%	6,348	3,655	3,290	7,485	–	–	–	20,778
Rimouski	Lib	Lib	9,987	35.89%	1,560	5.61%	85.67%	9,987	8,427	5,247	4,168	–	–	–	27,829
Rivière-du-Loup	UN	Lib	8,586	41.40%	1,001	4.83%	86.03%	8,586	2,008	7,585	2,558	–	–	–	20,737
Robert-Baldwin	Ind	Lib	46,169	87.46%	41,316	78.26%	86.86%	46,169	4,853	1,769	–	–	–	–	52,791
Roberval	UN	Lib	9,845	37.85%	2,609	10.03%	84.64%	9,845	5,977	7,236	2,956	–	–	–	26,014
Rouville	UN	Lib	6,564	40.90%	309	1.93%	88.93%	6,564	2,327	6,255	904	–	–	–	16,050
Rouyn-Noranda	UN	RC	9,573	51.91%	5,560	30.15%	88.37%	4,013	2,756	2,101	9,573	–	–	–	18,443
Saguenay	Lib	PQ	12,392	44.77%	2,248	8.12%	82.19%	10,144	12,392	4,007	1,138	–	–	–	27,681
Saint-Henri	UN	Lib	14,096	46.88%	2,701	8.98%	79.28%	14,096	11,395	4,036	–	244	295	–	30,066
Saint-Hyacinthe	UN	Lib	10,628	38.24%	2,044	7.36%	86.53%	10,628	5,696	8,584	2,801	81	–	–	27,790
Saint-Jacques	UN	PQ	8,554	39.01%	1,490	6.80%	71.16%	7,064	8,554	5,377	848	84	–	–	21,927
Saint-Jean	UN	Lib	8,993	38.55%	2,172	9.31%	89.43%	8,993	6,821	6,605	909	–	–	–	23,328
Saint-Laurent	Lib	Lib	33,109	72.03%	23,650	51.45%	84.81%	33,109	9,459	2,917	–	–	483	–	45,968
Saint-Louis	Lib	Lib	12,303	64.71%	7,708	40.54%	70.20%	12,303	4,595	1,526	–	–	376	213	19,013
Saint-Maurice	UN	UN	11,921	36.93%	4,045	12.53%	85.86%	7,857	7,876	11,921	4,625	–	–	–	32,279
Saint-Sauveur	UN	RC	9,217	31.22%	532	1.80%	82.07%	8,685	4,912	6,712	9,217	–	–	–	29,526
Saint-Anne	Ind	Lib	8,914	48.00%	4,039	21.75%	70.02%	8,914	3,809	804	–	5,045 (Note: Frank Hanley (4,875 votes) was the incumbent)	–	–	18,572
Sainte-Marie	UN	PQ	10,707	42.57%	2,513	9.99%	73.11%	8,194	10,707	5,165	1,088	–	–	–	25,154
Shefford	UN	UN	10,480	33.21%	1,636	5.18%	87.00%	8,844	4,113	10,480	8,124	–	–	–	31,561
Sherbrooke	UN	Lib	17,319	34.26%	5,603	11.08%	84.25%	17,319	10,783	10,421	11,716	–	307	–	50,546
Stanstead	Lib	Lib	8,897	49.10%	3,973	21.92%	84.04%	8,897	2,000	2,300	4,924	–	–	–	18,121
Taillon	Lib	Lib	16,501	42.63%	5,363	13.86%	80.56%	16,501	11,138	4,997	2,826	247	–	2,998	38,707
Témiscamingue	Lib	Lib	3,747	43.88%	902	10.56%	84.17%	3,747	499	1,448	2,845	–	–	–	8,539
Témiscouata	UN	UN	3,929	35.51%	573	5.18%	84.68%	3,356	877	3,929	2,901	–	–	–	11,063
Terrebonne	UN	Lib	30,452	45.54%	12,467	18.64%	85.42%	30,452	17,985	13,406	5,028	–	–	–	66,871
Trois-Rivières	UN	Lib	12,899	39.84%	4,193	12.95%	81.15%	12,899	6,995	8,706	3,778	–	–	–	32,378
Vaudreuil-Soulanges	Lib	Lib	11,841	50.12%	5,452	23.08%	84.88%	11,841	4,183	6,389	1,158	–	–	53	23,624
Verchères	Lib	Lib	14,822	53.23%	6,796	24.41%	86.65%	14,822	8,026	3,995	1,001	–	–	–	27,844
Verdun	Lib	Lib	23,630	59.85%	14,332	36.30%	83.53%	23,630	9,298	4,129	1,117	1,121	186	–	39,481
Westmount	Lib	Lib	32,703	85.30%	29,056	75.78%	80.47%	32,703	3,647	1,126	336	–	529	–	38,341
Wolfe	UN	UN	3,712	44.40%	1,630	19.50%	88.76%	2,082	706	3,712	1,860	–	–	–	8,360
Yamaska	UN	Lib	3,826	46.88%	487	5.97%	86.90%	3,826	558	3,339	438	–	–	–	8,161

= open seat
= turnout is above provincial average
= winning candidate was in previous Legislature
= incumbent had switched allegiance
= previously incumbent in another riding
= not incumbent; was previously elected to the Legislature
= incumbency arose from byelection gain
= other incumbents renominated
= previously an MP in the House of Commons of Canada
= multiple candidates

=== Analysis ===
Elections to the National Assembly of Quebec – seats won/lost by party, 1966-1970
Party	1966	Gain from (loss to)										1970
Party	1966	Lib		UN		RC		PQ		Ind		1970
Liberal	50			25			(3)		(2)	2		72
Union Nationale	56		(25)				(9)		(5)			17
Ralliement créditiste	–	3		9								12
Parti Québécois	–	2		5								7
Independent	2		(2)									–
Total	108	5	(27)	39	–	–	(12)	–	(7)	2	–	108

Party candidates in 2nd place
Party in 1st place	Party in 2nd place					Total
Party in 1st place	Lib	UN	RC	PQ	Ind	Total
Liberal		24	10	37	1	72
Union Nationale	16			1		17
Ralliement créditiste	9	3				12
Parti Québécois	7					7
Total	32	27	10	38	1	108

Candidates ranked 1st to 5th place, by party
Parties	1st	2nd	3rd	4th	5th
█ Liberal	72	32	4		
█ Union Nationale	17	27	56	8	
█ Ralliement créditiste	12	10	14	58	5
█ Parti Québécois	7	38	33	30	
█ Independent		1		2	14
█ New Democratic			1	5	6
█ Independent PQ				1	
█ Independent Créditiste					1
█ Communist					1
█ Socialist Workers					1

Resulting composition of the 28th Quebec Legislative Assembly
Source		Party				
Source		Lib	UN	RC	PQ	Total
Seats retained	Incumbents returned	34	17			51
Seats retained	Open seats held	8				8
Seats retained	Ouster of incumbent changing allegiance	1				1
Seats retained	Byelection loss reversed	1				1
Seats changing hands	Incumbents defeated	24		7	7	38
Seats changing hands	Open seats gained	3		5		8
Seats changing hands	Incumbent changing allegiance	1				
Total		72	17	12	7	108

== See also ==
- List of Quebec premiers
- Politics of Quebec
- Timeline of Quebec history
- List of Quebec political parties
- 29th National Assembly of Quebec
- New Democratic Party of Quebec candidates, 1970 Quebec provincial election
