= 1966 Quebec general election =

Canadian provincial election

- June 5, 1966

108 seats in the 28th Legislative Assembly of Quebec 55 seats were needed for a majority
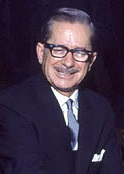

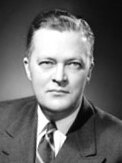
	First party	Second party
Leader	Daniel Johnson Sr.	Jean Lesage
Party	Union Nationale	Liberal
Leader since	September 23, 1961	May 31, 1958
Leader's seat	Bagot	Louis-Hébert
Last election	31 seats, 42.15%	63 seats, 56.40%
Seats won	56	50
Seat change	▲25	▼13
Popular vote	948,928	1,099,435
Percentage	40.82%	47.29%
Swing	▼1.34%	▼9.11%
Premier before election
Jean Lesage
Liberal
Premier after election
Daniel Johnson Sr.
Union Nationale

The 1966 Quebec general election was held on June 5, 1966, to elect members of the Legislative Assembly of Quebec, Canada. The Union Nationale (UN), led by Daniel Johnson, Sr, defeated the incumbent Quebec Liberal Party, led by Jean Lesage.

In terms of the number of seats won, the election was one of the closest in recent history, with the UN winning 56 seats to the Liberals' 50. Generally, Quebec's first past the post electoral system tends to produce strong disparities in the number of seats won even if the popular vote is fairly close. In this case, the most popular party did not win the most seats in the chamber. The Liberals won 6.5% more votes, but were denied a third term because the rural part of the province, where the Union Nationale did well, were slightly over-represented in the legislature.

The victory of the UN over the popular Lesage government was a surprise to many observers. Johnson's campaign was likely helped by his position that Quebec should get a better deal within the Canadian confederation, or should separate if it is unable to do so. In this sense, the forces of Quebec nationalism unleashed by the Quiet Revolution begun by Lesage may have contributed to his defeat, as many rural voters felt chagrin at the rapid pace of reform under the Liberals.

The pro-independence Rassemblement pour l'indépendance nationale and Ralliement national (formed from splinter groups out of the RIN and the Ralliement des créditistes) obtained a combined total of just under 9% of the popular vote (but no seats).

This was the last election for the "Legislative Assembly of Quebec". Legislation was passed to replace the bicameral system of Legislative Assembly and Legislative Council of Quebec with a single National Assembly of Quebec, effective December 31, 1968.

Daniel Johnson died in office in 1968, and was succeeded by Jean-Jacques Bertrand. Johnson's sons, Pierre-Marc and Daniel Jr, each later served as Premier of Quebec in 1985 and 1994.

This was the last election which was won by the Union Nationale, and the last that a party other than the Quebec Liberals or the Parti Québécois formed government in Quebec until the 2018 Quebec general election.

== Redistribution of ridings ==
A 1965 Act increased the number of MPPs from 95 to 108 through the following changes:

Abolished ridings	New ridings
Drawn from parts of other ridings
	Ahuntsic (Note: formerly part of Laval); D'Arcy-McGee (Note: formerly parts of Montréal-Outremont and Westmount–Saint-Georges); Dorion (Note: formerly parts of Montréal-Outremont, Montréal–Jeanne-Mance and Montréal-Laurier); Fabre (Note: formerly part of Laval); Gouin (Note: formerly parts of Montréal–Jeanne-Mance and Montréal-Laurier); Marguerite-Bourgeoys (Note: formerly parts of Jacques-Cartier and Montréal–Notre-Dame-de-Grâce); Robert-Baldwin (Note: formerly part of Jacques-Cartier); Saint-Laurent (Note: formerly parts of Jacques-Cartier and Laval); Taillon (Note: formerly parts of Chambly and Verchères)
Reorganization of ridings
Québec-Comté; Québec-Centre; Québec-Est; Québec-Ouest	Chauveau; Jean-Talon; Limoilou; Louis-Hébert
Division of ridings
Jonquière-Kénogami	Dubuc (Note: also taking in part of Chicoutimi); Jonquière
Bourget	Bourget; Bourassa; LaFontaine; Olier
Renaming of ridings
Montréal–Jeanne-Mance	Jeanne-Mance
Montréal-Laurier	Laurier
Montréal-Mercier	Mercier
Montréal–Notre-Dame-de-Grâce	Notre-Dame-de-Grâce
Montréal-Outremont	Outremont
Montréal–Sainte-Anne	Saint-Anne
Montréal–Sainte-Marie	Sainte-Marie
Montréal–Saint-Henri	Saint-Henri
Montréal–Saint-Jacques	Saint-Jacques
Montréal–Saint-Louis	Saint-Louis
Montréal-Verdun	Verdun
Westmount–Saint-Georges	Westmount

== Campaign ==
Riding contests, by number of candidates (1966)
Candidates	UN	Lib	RN	RIN	Ind	Con	Soc	Comm	DVP	PDE	Total
2	10	10									20
3	28	28	20	8							84
4	42	42	42	37	5						168
5	22	22	22	22	10	2	5	4	1		110
6	6	6	6	6	9	2				1	36
Total	108	108	90	73	24	4	5	4	1	1	418

== Results ==
Elections to the Legislative Assembly of Quebec (1966)
Political party	Party leader	MPPs				Votes			
Political party	Party leader	Candidates	1962	1966	±	#	±	%	± (pp)
Union Nationale	Daniel Johnson, Sr.	108	31	56	25▲	948,928	48,111▲	40.82%	1.33▼
Liberal	Jean Lesage	108	63	50	13▼	1,099,435	105,818▼	47.29%	9.11▼
RIN	Pierre Bourgault	73	–	–	–	129,045	129,045▲	5.55%	New
Ralliement national	Gilles Grégoire	90	–	–	–	74,670	74,670▲	3.21%	New
Independent		24	1	2	1▲	64,434	50,853▲	2.77%	2.13▲
Other candidates									
█ Conservative		4	–	–	–	6,183	1,927▲	0.27%	0.07▲
█ Socialist		5	–	–	–	1,090	1,090▲	0.05%	New
█ Communist		4	–	–	–	502	431▲	0.02%	0.02▲
█ Droit vital personnel		1	–	–	–	417	417▲	0.02%	New
█ Parti du développement économique		1	–	–	–	125	125▲	0.01%	New
Total		418	95	108		2,324,829		100%	
Rejected ballots						45,681	16,172▲		
Voter turnout						2,370,510	204,034▲	73.57	6.02▼
Registered electors						3,222,302	500,369▲		

=== Vote and seat summaries ===
Ternary plots - shift of electoral support (1962-1966)
1962

1966
Electoral districts identified by colours of winning parties

Seats and popular vote by party
Party	Seats	Votes	Change (pp)
Union Nationale	56 / 108	40.82%	-1.33
Liberal	50 / 108	47.29%	-9.11
RIN	0 / 108	5.55%	5.55
Ralliement national	0 / 108	3.21%	3.21
Independent	2 / 108	2.77%	2.13
Other	0 / 108	0.36%	-0.45

=== Synopsis of results ===
Results by riding - 1966 Quebec general election
Riding	Winning party						Turnout (Note: including spoilt ballots)	Votes							
Name	1962	Party	Votes	Share	Margin #	Margin %	Turnout	UN	Lib	RIN	RN	Ind	Con	Other	Total
Abitibi-Est	Lib	Lib	12,390	39.09%	1,664	5.25%	74.55%	10,726	12,390	1,434	7,145	–	–	–	31,695
Abitibi-Ouest	Lib	Lib	5,670	42.51%	1,612	12.08%	86.98%	4,058	5,670	318	3,293	–	–	–	13,339
Ahuntsic	New	Lib	16,282	56.34%	8,355	28.91%	70.61%	7,927	16,282	4,195	266	228	–	–	28,898
Argenteuil	UN	Lib	6,734	44.85%	2,273	15.14%	81.29%	4,461	6,734	245	87	3,488	–	–	15,015
Arthabaska	Lib	UN	10,188	44.81%	104	0.46%	85.86%	10,188	10,084	591	1,871	–	–	–	22,734
Bagot	UN	UN	6,640	57.69%	2,074	18.02%	89.76%	6,640	4,566	163	140	–	–	–	11,509
Beauce	UN	UN	15,743	54.96%	4,558	15.91%	84.77%	15,743	11,185	–	1,715	–	–	–	28,643
Beauharnois	Lib	Lib	10,875	41.29%	2,089	7.93%	86.32%	8,786	10,875	984	93	5,603	–	–	26,341
Bellechasse	UN	UN	6,917	58.80%	2,071	17.61%	83.15%	6,917	4,846	–	–	–	–	–	11,763
Berthier	Lib	UN	7,668	55.49%	1,766	12.78%	85.17%	7,668	5,902	–	249	–	–	–	13,819
Bonaventure	Lib	Lib	10,888	60.41%	3,752	20.82%	78.83%	7,136	10,888	–	–	–	–	–	18,024
Bourassa	New	Lib	14,653	48.79%	5,090	16.95%	64.73%	9,563	14,653	4,420	634	761	–	–	30,031
Bourget	Lib	UN	13,166	46.08%	1,188	4.16%	66.70%	13,166	11,978	2,754	376	–	–	295	28,569
Brome	Lib	Lib	3,294	52.65%	470	7.51%	74.49%	2,824	3,294	–	139	–	–	–	6,257
Chambly	Lib	Lib	19,183	60.51%	10,976	34.62%	68.22%	8,207	19,183	3,895	418	–	–	–	31,703
Champlain	UN	UN	15,102	57.71%	5,240	20.03%	86.54%	15,102	9,862	–	1,203	–	–	–	26,167
Charlevoix	Lib	Lib	8,166	54.00%	1,210	8.00%	85.38%	6,956	8,166	–	–	–	–	–	15,122
Châteauguay	Lib	Lib	6,676	34.72%	1,057	5.50%	78.60%	5,619	6,676	727	92	6,113	–	–	19,227
Chauveau	New	UN	17,462	47.40%	942	2.56%	79.55%	17,462	16,520	1,921	940	–	–	–	36,843
Chicoutimi	UN	UN	9,824	49.70%	1,954	9.88%	81.48%	9,824	7,870	–	2,074	–	–	–	19,768
Compton	UN	UN	5,973	56.89%	1,696	16.15%	83.26%	5,973	4,277	–	249	–	–	–	10,499
D'Arcy-McGee	New	Lib	24,709	90.57%	23,161	84.90%	60.88%	1,548	24,709	895	129	–	–	–	27,281
Deux-Montagnes	Lib	Lib	8,511	47.64%	94	0.53%	84.35%	8,417	8,511	821	117	–	–	–	17,866
Dorchester	UN	UN	9,348	55.02%	2,402	14.14%	82.36%	9,348	6,946	–	695	–	–	–	16,989
Dorion	New	Lib	9,855	43.99%	1,275	5.69%	60.58%	8,580	9,855	2,184	281	1,378	–	125	22,403
Drummond	Lib	Lib	14,470	49.27%	360	1.23%	85.77%	14,110	14,470	–	791	–	–	–	29,371
Dubuc	New	UN	7,829	37.16%	1,567	7.44%	84.30%	7,829	6,262	–	3,400	3,577	–	–	21,068
Duplessis	Lib	Lib	6,673	47.77%	2,281	16.33%	75.46%	2,709	6,673	4,392	195	–	–	–	13,969
Fabre	New	Lib	16,278	47.80%	3,468	10.18%	72.15%	12,810	16,278	4,363	449	–	–	156	34,056
Frontenac	UN	UN	6,902	52.16%	1,601	12.10%	86.13%	6,902	5,301	155	874	–	–	–	13,232
Gaspé-Nord	UN	UN	5,251	51.12%	366	3.56%	86.12%	5,251	4,885	136	–	–	–	–	10,272
Gaspé-Sud	Lib	Lib	8,513	53.48%	1,108	6.96%	86.04%	7,405	8,513	–	–	–	–	–	15,918
Gatineau	Lib	Lib	11,308	51.26%	1,877	8.51%	69.81%	9,431	11,308	1,117	205	–	–	–	22,061
Gouin	New	Lib	12,916	47.32%	2,799	10.26%	61.75%	10,117	12,916	3,507	646	–	–	108	27,294
Hull	Lib	Lib	10,803	50.91%	2,610	12.30%	64.11%	8,193	10,803	2,222	–	–	–	–	21,218
Huntingdon	UN	Lib	3,469	50.33%	45	0.65%	81.51%	3,424	3,469	–	–	–	–	–	6,893
Iberville	Lib	UN	4,470	50.25%	704	7.91%	85.20%	4,470	3,766	431	229	–	–	–	8,896
Îles-de-la-Madeleine	Lib	Lib	3,908	66.59%	1,947	33.17%	89.97%	1,961	3,908	–	–	–	–	–	5,869
Jacques-Cartier	Lib	Lib	18,289	68.34%	11,833	44.22%	65.19%	6,456	18,289	1,808	209	–	–	–	26,762
Jean-Talon	New	Lib	14,257	53.23%	3,821	14.26%	70.11%	10,436	14,257	1,384	709	–	–	–	26,786
Jeanne-Mance	Lib	Lib	16,691	51.85%	6,063	18.83%	62.64%	10,628	16,691	4,271	333	–	–	269	32,192
Joliette	UN	UN	11,372	50.96%	2,236	10.02%	81.30%	11,372	9,136	1,423	386	–	–	–	22,317
Jonquière	New	Lib	11,959	46.91%	4,495	17.63%	79.06%	7,464	11,959	916	4,992	–	–	165	25,496
Kamouraska	Lib	UN	6,161	52.35%	1,406	11.95%	77.12%	6,161	4,755	–	175	678	–	–	11,769
L'Assomption	Lib	UN	9,958	46.90%	490	2.31%	80.38%	9,958	9,468	1,443	363	–	–	–	21,232
L'Islet	UN	UN	5,972	55.26%	1,136	10.51%	80.66%	5,972	4,836	–	–	–	–	–	10,808
Labelle	UN	UN	6,827	57.79%	2,502	21.18%	81.78%	6,827	4,325	536	125	–	–	–	11,813
Lac-Saint-Jean	Lib	UN	10,985	52.22%	2,555	12.15%	86.09%	10,985	8,430	–	1,621	–	–	–	21,036
LaFontaine	New	UN	13,592	44.95%	785	2.60%	67.58%	13,592	12,807	3,374	466	–	–	–	30,239
Laurier	Lib	Lib	15,012	56.61%	6,754	25.47%	62.92%	8,258	15,012	2,131	701	–	–	417	26,519
Laval	Lib	Lib	16,910	48.69%	4,704	13.55%	72.67%	12,206	16,910	3,131	324	2,156	–	–	34,727
Laviolette	UN	UN	12,082	54.16%	3,417	15.32%	80.86%	12,082	8,665	1,559	–	–	–	–	22,306
Lévis	Lib	UN	15,141	53.10%	3,121	10.95%	83.04%	15,141	12,020	843	511	–	–	–	28,515
Limoilou	New	UN	16,547	49.67%	1,651	4.96%	76.50%	16,547	14,896	1,234	582	–	–	55	33,314
Lotbinière	UN	UN	6,218	45.75%	87	0.64%	86.82%	6,218	6,131	–	1,243	–	–	–	13,592
Louis-Hébert	New	Lib	22,532	65.70%	14,156	41.28%	77.16%	8,376	22,532	2,991	394	–	–	–	34,293
Maisonneuve	Lib	UN	12,621	44.68%	1,029	3.64%	60.12%	12,621	11,592	3,457	371	–	–	205	28,246
Marguerite-Bourgeoys	New	Lib	14,603	62.14%	9,944	42.31%	62.30%	4,659	14,603	1,297	173	2,769	–	–	23,501
Maskinongé	UN	UN	6,115	52.94%	853	7.38%	90.50%	6,115	5,262	–	174	–	–	–	11,551
Matane	Lib	Lib	9,045	49.76%	299	1.64%	79.72%	8,746	9,045	–	386	–	–	–	18,177
Matapédia	Lib	Lib	6,165	48.64%	22	0.17%	80.50%	6,143	6,165	220	146	–	–	–	12,674
Mégantic	Lib	UN	11,894	46.38%	588	2.29%	84.08%	11,894	11,306	–	2,443	–	–	–	25,643
Mercier	Lib	Lib	11,759	44.27%	518	1.95%	61.41%	11,241	11,759	3,115	335	–	–	112	26,562
Missisquoi	UN	UN	8,788	60.10%	3,469	23.72%	77.05%	8,788	5,319	390	126	–	–	–	14,623
Montcalm	Lib	UN	5,007	51.32%	470	4.82%	87.00%	5,007	4,537	168	44	–	–	–	9,756
Montmagny	UN	UN	6,763	54.63%	1,426	11.52%	82.59%	6,763	5,337	–	279	–	–	–	12,379
Montmorency	UN	UN	14,151	54.25%	4,524	17.34%	82.94%	14,151	9,627	1,423	885	–	–	–	26,086
Napierville-Laprairie	Lib	Lib	9,683	43.06%	762	3.39%	79.60%	8,921	9,683	–	488	3,396	–	–	22,488
Nicolet	Lib	UN	8,140	52.33%	855	5.50%	89.77%	8,140	7,285	–	130	–	–	–	15,555
Notre-Dame-de-Grâce	Lib	Lib	19,563	76.42%	16,622	64.93%	59.34%	2,068	19,563	949	77	–	2,941	–	25,598
Olier	New	Lib	11,990	47.03%	2,316	9.08%	57.89%	9,674	11,990	3,366	464	–	–	–	25,494
Outremont	Lib	Lib	18,075	71.18%	14,857	58.51%	64.48%	2,744	18,075	3,218	118	–	1,238	–	25,393
Papineau	UN	UN	10,999	45.35%	563	2.32%	78.04%	10,999	10,436	2,504	313	–	–	–	24,252
Pontiac	UN	UN	4,429	51.22%	211	2.44%	72.91%	4,429	4,218	–	–	–	–	–	8,647
Portneuf	Lib	UN	11,265	42.76%	1,287	4.89%	81.37%	11,265	9,978	613	4,407	82	–	–	26,345
Richelieu	Lib	UN	12,257	49.43%	1,080	4.36%	84.76%	12,257	11,177	1,221	141	–	–	–	24,796
Richmond	Lib	Lib	8,258	47.56%	263	1.51%	77.79%	7,995	8,258	–	1,112	–	–	–	17,365
Rimouski	Lib	Lib	11,938	49.84%	428	1.79%	78.86%	11,510	11,938	504	–	–	–	–	23,952
Rivière-du-Loup	Lib	UN	9,691	52.18%	811	4.37%	83.20%	9,691	8,880	–	–	–	–	–	18,571
Robert-Baldwin	New	Ind	19,506	53.32%	7,752	21.19%	73.30%	2,991	11,754	900	144	19,506	1,287	–	36,582
Roberval	UN	UN	11,799	48.35%	1,546	6.34%	82.92%	11,799	10,253	–	2,077	273	–	–	24,402
Rouville	Lib	UN	6,080	46.60%	5	0.04%	81.68%	6,080	6,075	687	206	–	–	–	13,048
Rouyn-Noranda	Lib	UN	6,583	38.62%	1,050	6.16%	81.10%	6,583	5,533	694	4,237	–	–	–	17,047
Saguenay	Lib	Lib	10,737	46.43%	1,232	5.33%	64.33%	9,505	10,737	–	2,444	437	–	–	23,123
Saint-Henri	Lib	UN	10,410	41.42%	1,561	6.21%	63.25%	10,410	8,849	3,034	371	2,470	–	–	25,134
Saint-Hyacinthe	Lib	UN	10,998	46.78%	30	0.13%	78.98%	10,998	10,968	1,544	–	–	–	–	23,510
Saint-Jacques	UN	UN	9,869	49.97%	2,206	11.17%	57.68%	9,869	7,663	1,834	383	–	–	–	19,749
Saint-Jean	Lib	UN	9,226	48.85%	2,586	13.69%	81.48%	9,226	6,640	780	174	2,067	–	–	18,887
Saint-Laurent	New	Lib	21,558	68.63%	14,853	47.28%	65.77%	6,705	21,558	3,151	–	–	–	–	31,414
Saint-Louis	Lib	Lib	8,960	58.45%	4,916	32.07%	55.45%	4,044	8,960	1,646	453	–	–	227	15,330
Saint-Maurice	Lib	UN	14,133	47.42%	1,720	5.77%	81.83%	14,133	12,413	3,256	–	–	–	–	29,802
Saint-Sauveur	UN	UN	14,485	57.73%	5,501	21.92%	73.23%	14,485	8,984	730	893	–	–	–	25,092
Saint-Anne	Ind	Ind	6,609	38.67%	1,638	9.58%	53.52%	4,328	4,971	747	208	6,837 (Note: Frank Hanley (6,609 votes) was the incumbent)	–	–	17,091
Sainte-Marie	UN	UN	11,285	53.10%	3,650	17.17%	57.19%	11,285	7,635	1,930	404	–	–	–	21,254
Shefford	UN	UN	14,549	53.69%	4,172	15.40%	80.21%	14,549	10,377	1,061	1,110	–	–	–	27,097
Sherbrooke	Lib	UN	19,915	50.11%	2,634	6.63%	74.58%	19,915	17,281	1,495	1,051	–	–	–	39,742
Stanstead	Lib	Lib	8,215	49.85%	577	3.50%	77.50%	7,638	8,215	–	627	–	–	–	16,480
Taillon	New	Lib	8,627	38.61%	210	0.94%	59.91%	8,417	8,627	4,097	685	517	–	–	22,343
Témiscamingue	Lib	Lib	4,413	49.15%	2,044	22.77%	83.76%	2,196	4,413	–	2,369	–	–	–	8,978
Témiscouata	UN	UN	5,653	51.97%	869	7.99%	84.02%	5,653	4,784	–	441	–	–	–	10,878
Terrebonne	Lib	UN	24,840	47.71%	2,525	4.85%	76.71%	24,840	22,315	4,227	681	–	–	–	52,063
Trois-Rivières	UN	UN	15,362	48.97%	1,045	3.33%	82.88%	15,362	14,317	1,692	–	–	–	–	31,371
Vaudreuil-Soulanges	Lib	Lib	11,120	53.17%	2,630	12.58%	81.90%	8,490	11,120	494	96	713	–	–	20,913
Verchères	Lib	Lib	11,648	55.73%	3,953	18.91%	75.46%	7,695	11,648	1,348	209	–	–	–	20,900
Verdun	Lib	Lib	19,181	66.26%	10,918	37.72%	62.55%	8,263	19,181	1,198	306	–	–	–	28,948
Westmount	Lib	Lib	20,061	78.21%	17,825	69.49%	55.18%	2,236	20,061	1,141	110	1,385	717	–	25,650
Wolfe	UN	UN	5,189	64.06%	2,528	31.21%	89.06%	5,189	2,661	–	250	–	–	–	8,100
Yamaska	UN	UN	4,093	51.75%	277	3.50%	87.90%	4,093	3,816	–	–	–	–	–	7,909

= open seat
= turnout is above provincial average
= winning candidate was in previous Legislature
= incumbent had switched allegiance
= previously incumbent in another riding
= not incumbent; was previously elected to the Legislature
= incumbency arose from byelection gain
= other incumbents renominated
= previously an MP in the House of Commons of Canada
= multiple candidates

=== Analysis ===
Party candidates in 2nd place
Party in 1st place	Party in 2nd place					Total
Party in 1st place	UN	Lib	RIN	RN	Con	Total
Union Nationale		56				56
Liberal	46		2	1	1	50
Independent		2				2
Total	46	58	2	1	1	108

Candidates ranked 1st to 5th place, by party
Parties	1st	2nd	3rd	4th	5th
█ Union Nationale	56	46	6		
█ Liberal	50	58			
█ Independent	2		10	6	6
█ RIN		2	52	18	1
█ Ralliement national		1	30	44	10
█ Conservative		1		2	1
█ Socialist					5
█ Communist					4
█ DVP					1

Resulting composition of the 28th Quebec Legislative Assembly
Source		Party			
Source		UN	Lib	Ind	Total
Seats retained	Incumbents returned	19	30	1	50
Seats retained	Open seats held	9	5		14
Seats retained	Byelection loss reversed	1			1
Seats changing hands	Incumbents defeated	22	1		23
Seats changing hands	Open seats gained	1	1		2
New ridings	New MPPs	2	9	1	12
New ridings	Previously incumbent in another riding		4		4
New ridings	Previously elected to the Legislature	2			2
Total		56	50	2	108

== See also ==
- List of Quebec premiers
- Politics of Quebec
- Timeline of Quebec history
- List of Quebec political parties
- 28th National Assembly of Quebec
