= 26th Quebec Legislature =

The 26th Legislative Assembly of Quebec was the political provincial legislature in Quebec, Canada that was elected in the 1960 Quebec general election. It sat from 20 September 1960 to 22 September 1960, from 10 November 1960 to 10 June 1961, and from 9 January 1962 to 19 September 1962. The Quebec Liberal Party led by Jean Lesage began the Quiet Revolution reforms. The Union Nationale, which had previously governed for more than 15 years, formed the official opposition under successive interim leaders Yves Prévost and Antonio Talbot, and then under Daniel Johnson, Sr. The Legislature lasted only two years as Lesage called the 1962 election as a referendum for the nationalization of hydroelectricity under Hydro-Québec.

== Seats per political party ==
- After the 1960 elections

Affiliation	Members
Liberal	51
Union Nationale	43
Independent	1
Total	95
Government Majority	8

== Member list ==
This was the list of members of the Legislative Assembly of Quebec that were elected in the 1960 election:

Name	Party	Riding	First elected / previously elected	No. of terms
Lucien Cliche	Libéral	Abitibi-Est	1960	1st term
Alcide Courcy	Libéral	Abitibi-Ouest	1956	2nd term
William McOuat Cottingham	Union Nationale	Argenteuil	1948	4th term
Albert Morissette	Libéral	Arthabaska	1960	1st term
Daniel Johnson	Union Nationale	Bagot	1946	5th term
Fabien Poulin	Libéral	Beauce	1960	1st term
Edgar Hébert	Union Nationale	Beauharnois	1948	4th term
Gustave Plante	Libéral	Bellechasse	1960	1st term
Azellus Lavallée	Union Nationale	Berthier	1948	4th term
Gérard D. Levesque	Libéral	Bonaventure	1956	2nd term
Jean Meunier	Libéral	Bourget	1960	1st term
Glendon Brown	Libéral	Brome	1956	2nd term
Robert Théberge	Libéral	Chambly	1956	2nd term
Pierre Laporte (1961)	Libéral	Chambly	1961	1st term
Maurice Bellemare	Union Nationale	Champlain	1944	5th term
Arthur Leclerc	Union Nationale	Charlevoix	1936, 1944	6th term*
Joseph-Maurice Laberge	Union Nationale	Châteauguay	1957	2nd term
Antonio Talbot	Union Nationale	Chicoutimi	1938	7th term
Claude-Gilles Gosselin	Union Nationale	Compton	1957	2nd term
Gaston Binette	Libéral	Deux-Montagnes	1960	1st term
Joseph-Damase Bégin	Union Nationale	Dorchester	1935	8th term
Bernard Pinard	Libéral	Drummond	1952, 1960	2nd term*
Henri-Laurier Coiteux	Libéral	Duplessis	1960	1st term
Éloi Guillemette	Union Nationale	Frontenac	1956	2nd term
Claude Jourdain	Libéral	Gaspé-Nord	1960	1st term
Camille-Eugène Pouliot	Union Nationale	Gaspé-Sud	1936	7th term
Gérard Desjardins	Union Nationale	Gatineau	1948	4th term
Oswald Parent	Libéral	Hull	1956	2nd term
Henry Somerville	Union Nationale	Huntingdon	1952	3rd term
Laurent Hamel	Libéral	Iberville	1960	1st term
Hormisdas Langlais	Union Nationale	Îles-de-la-Madeleine	1936	7th term
Charles-Aimé Kirkland	Libéral	Jacques-Cartier	1939	6th term
Marie-Claire Kirkland (1961)	Libéral	Jacques-Cartier	1961	1st term
Antonio Barrette	Union Nationale	Joliette	1936	7th term
Gaston Lambert (1960)	Libéral	Joliette	1960	1st term
Gérald Harvey	Libéral	Jonquière-Kénogami	1960	1st term
Alfred Plourde	Union Nationale	Kamouraska	1948	4th term
Fernand Lafontaine	Union Nationale	Labelle	1959	2nd term
Lucien Collard	Libéral	Lac-Saint-Jean	1960	1st term
Victor-Stanislas Chartrand	Union Nationale	L'Assomption	1944	5th term
Frédéric Coiteux (1961)	Libéral	L'Assomption	1961	1st term
Jean-Noël Lavoie	Libéral	Laval	1960	1st term
Charles Romulus Ducharme	Union Nationale	Laviolette	1935, 1944	7th term*
Roger Roy	Libéral	Lévis	1960	1st term
André Rousseau	Libéral	L'Islet	1960	1st term
René Bernatchez	Union Nationale	Lotbinière	1948	4th term
Lucien Tremblay	Union Nationale	Maisonneuve	1956	2nd term
Germain Caron	Union Nationale	Maskinongé	1944	5th term
Philippe Castonguay	Libéral	Matane	1960	1st term
Bona Arsenault	Libéral	Matapédia	1960	1st term
Pierre J. Maheux	Libéral	Mégantic	1960	1st term
Jean-Jacques Bertrand	Union Nationale	Missisquoi	1948	4th term
Maurice Tellier	Union Nationale	Montcalm	1936, 1944	6th term*
Laurent Lizotte	Libéral	Montmagny	1960	1st term
Yves Prévost	Union Nationale	Montmorency	1948	4th term
Maurice-Tréflé Custeau	Union Nationale	Montréal–Jeanne-Mance	1956	2nd term
René Lévesque	Libéral	Montréal-Laurier	1960	1st term
Gérard Thibeault	Union Nationale	Montréal-Mercier	1936, 1948	5th term*
Paul Earl	Libéral	Montréal–Notre-Dame-de-Grâce	1948	4th term
Georges-Émile Lapalme	Libéral	Montréal-Outremont	1953	3rd term
Francis Hanley	Independent	Montréal–Sainte-Anne	1948	4th term
Edgar Charbonneau	Union Nationale	Montréal–Sainte-Marie	1956	2nd term
Philippe Lalonde	Libéral	Montréal–Saint-Henri	1952	3rd term
Paul Dozois	Union Nationale	Montréal–Saint-Jacques	1956	2nd term
Harry Blank	Libéral	Montréal–Saint-Louis	1960	1st term
George O'Reilly	Libéral	Montréal-Verdun	1960	1st term
Hercule Riendeau	Union Nationale	Napierville-Laprairie	1944	5th term
Camille Roy	Union Nationale	Nicolet	1952	3rd term
Roméo Lorrain	Union Nationale	Papineau	1935	8th term
Raymond Thomas Johnston	Union Nationale	Pontiac	1948	4th term
Marcellin Laroche	Libéral	Portneuf	1960	1st term
Maurice Cloutier	Union Nationale	Québec-Centre	1952	3rd term
Jean-Jacques Bédard	Libéral	Québec-Comté	1952, 1960	2nd term*
Armand Maltais	Union Nationale	Québec-Est	1956	2nd term
Jean Lesage	Libéral	Québec-Ouest	1960	1st term
Gérard Cournoyer	Libéral	Richelieu	1952, 1960	2nd term*
Émilien Lafrance	Libéral	Richmond	1952	3rd term
Albert Dionne	Libéral	Rimouski	1956	2nd term
Alphonse Couturier	Libéral	Rivière-du-Loup	1956	2nd term
Jean-Claude Plourde	Libéral	Roberval	1960	1st term
Laurent Barré	Union Nationale	Rouville	1931, 1944	8th term*
François Boulais (1960)	Libéral	Rouville	1960	1st term
Edgar Turpin	Libéral	Rouyn-Noranda	1956	2nd term
Lucien Bélanger	Libéral	Saguenay	1960	1st term
René Saint-Pierre	Libéral	Saint-Hyacinthe	1956	2nd term
Philodor Ouimet	Libéral	Saint-Jean	1960	1st term
René Hamel	Libéral	Saint-Maurice	1952	3rd term
Francis Boudreau	Union Nationale	Saint-Sauveur	1948	4th term
Armand Russell	Union Nationale	Shefford	1956	2nd term
Louis-Philippe Brousseau	Libéral	Sherbrooke	1960	1st term
Georges Vaillancourt	Libéral	Stanstead	1960	1st term
Joseph-André Larouche	Union Nationale	Témiscamingue	1956	2nd term
Antoine Raymond	Union Nationale	Témiscouata	1952	3rd term
Lionel Bertrand	Libéral	Terrebonne	1960	1st term
Yves Gabias	Union Nationale	Trois-Rivières	1960	1st term
Paul Gérin-Lajoie	Libéral	Vaudreuil-Soulanges	1960	1st term
Guy Lechasseur	Libéral	Verchères	1960	1st term
John Richard Hyde	Libéral	Westmount–Saint-Georges	1955	3rd term
Gérard Lemieux	Libéral	Wolfe	1952, 1960	2nd term*
Antonio Élie	Union Nationale	Yamaska	1931	9th term

== Other elected MLAs ==
Other MLAs were elected during this mandate in by-elections

- Gaston Lambert, Quebec Liberal Party, Joliette, November 23, 1960
- François Boulais, Quebec Liberal Party, Rouville, November 23, 1960
- Pierre Laporte, Quebec Liberal Party, Chambly, December 14, 1961
- Marie-Claire Kirkland, Quebec Liberal Party, Jacques-Cartier, December 14, 1961

== Cabinet Ministers ==
- Prime Minister and Executive Council President: Jean Lesage
- Vice-President of the Executive Council: Georges-Émile Lapalme
- Agriculture: Alcide Courcy (1960–1962)
- Colonization: Alcide Courcy (1960–1962)
  - Agriculture and Colonization: Alcide Courcy (1962)
- Labour: René Hamel
- Public Works: René Lévesque (1960–1961), René Saint-Pierre (1961–1962)
- Cultural Affairs: Georges-Émile Lapalme (1961–1962)
- Social Welfare: Émilien Lafrance (1960–1961)
  - Family and Social Welfare: Émilien Lafrance (1961–1962)
- Youth: Paul Gérin-Lajoie
- Health: Alphonse Couturier
- Lands and Forests: Bona Arsenault
- Fisheries and Hunting: Gérard D. Levesque
- Mines: Paul Earl (1960–1961)
- Hydraulic resources: René Lévesque (1960–1961)
  - Natural Ressources: René Lévesque (1961–1962)
- Roads: Bernard Pinard
- Transportation and Communications: Gérard Cournoyer
- Municipal Affairs: René Hamel (1960–1961), Lucien Cliche (1961–1962)
- Federal-provincial Affairs: Jean Lesage (1961–1962)
- Industry and Commerce: André Rousseau
- Attorney General: Georges-Émile Lapalme
- Provincial Secretary: Lionel Bertrand
- Finances: Jean Lesage
- Revenu: Paul Earl (1961–1962)
- State Ministers: George Carlyle Marler, Charles-Aimé Kirkland
