= 27th Quebec Legislature =

The 27th Legislative Assembly of Quebec was the Quebec, Canada provincial legislature that was elected in the 1962 Quebec general election. It sat for six sessions, from 15 January 1963 to 11 July 1963; from 21 August 1963 to 23 August 1963; from 14 January 1964 to 31 July 1964; from 21 January 1965 to 6 August 1965; from 22 October 1965 to 23 October 1965; and from 25 January 1966 to 18 April 1966. The Liberal government led by Jean Lesage continued the Quiet Revolution reforms begun during its first mandate. The official opposition Union Nationale was led by Daniel Johnson, Sr.

== Seats per political party ==
- After the 1962 elections

Affiliation	Members
Liberal	63
Union Nationale	31
Independent	1
Total	95
Government Majority	32

== Member list ==
This was the list of members of the Legislative Assembly of Quebec that were elected in the 1962 election:

Name	Party	Riding	First elected / previously elected	No. of terms
Lucien Cliche	Libéral	Abitibi-Est	1960	2nd term
Alcide Courcy	Libéral	Abitibi-Ouest	1956	3rd term
William McOuat Cottingham	Union Nationale	Argenteuil	1948	5th term
Albert Morissette	Libéral	Arthabaska	1960	2nd term
Daniel Johnson	Union Nationale	Bagot	1946	6th term
Paul-Émile Allard	Union Nationale	Beauce	1962	1st term
Gérard Cadieux	Libéral	Beauharnois	1962	1st term
Gabriel Loubier	Union Nationale	Bellechasse	1962	1st term
Lucien McGuire	Libéral	Berthier	1962	1st term
Gérard D. Levesque	Libéral	Bonaventure	1956	3rd term
Jean Meunier	Libéral	Bourget	1960	2nd term
Glendon Brown	Libéral	Brome	1956	3rd term
Pierre Laporte	Libéral	Chambly	1961	2nd term
Maurice Bellemare	Union Nationale	Champlain	1944	6th term
Raymond Mailloux	Libéral	Charlevoix	1962	1st term
George Kennedy	Libéral	Châteauguay	1962	1st term
Antonio Talbot	Union Nationale	Chicoutimi	1938	8th term
Claude-Gilles Gosselin	Union Nationale	Compton	1957	3rd term
Gaston Binette	Libéral	Deux-Montagnes	1960	2nd term
Joseph-Armand Nadeau	Union Nationale	Dorchester	1962	1st term
Francis O'Farrell (1964)	Libéral	Dorchester	1964	1st term
Bernard Pinard	Libéral	Drummond	1952, 1960	3rd term*
Henri-Laurier Coiteux	Libéral	Duplessis	1960	2nd term
Éloi Guillemette	Union Nationale	Frontenac	1956	3rd term
François Gagnon	Union Nationale	Gaspé-Nord	1962	1st term
Guy Fortier	Libéral	Gaspé-Sud	1962	1st term
Roy Fournier	Libéral	Gatineau	1962	1st term
Oswald Parent	Libéral	Hull	1956	3rd term
Henry Somerville	Union Nationale	Huntingdon	1952	4th term
Laurent Hamel	Libéral	Iberville	1960	2nd term
Louis-Philippe Lacroix	Libéral	Îles-de-la-Madeleine	1962	1st term
Marie-Claire Kirkland	Libéral	Jacques-Cartier	1961	2nd term
Maurice Majeau	Union Nationale	Joliette	1962	1st term
Gérald Harvey	Libéral	Jonquière-Kénogami	1960	2nd term
Gérard Dallaire	Libéral	Kamouraska	1962	1st term
Fernand Lafontaine	Union Nationale	Labelle	1959	3rd term
Lucien Collard	Libéral	Lac-Saint-Jean	1960	2nd term
Frédéric Coiteux	Libéral	L'Assomption	1961	2nd term
Jean-Noël Lavoie	Libéral	Laval	1960	2nd term
Charles Romulus Ducharme	Union Nationale	Laviolette	1935, 1944	8th term*
Roger Roy	Libéral	Lévis	1960	2nd term
Fernand Lizotte	Union Nationale	L'Islet	1948, 1962	4th term*
René Bernatchez	Union Nationale	Lotbinière	1948	5th term
Marcel Dupré	Libéral	Maisonneuve	1962	1st term
Germain Caron	Union Nationale	Maskinongé	1944	6th term
Philippe Castonguay	Libéral	Matane	1960	2nd term
Jacques Bernier (1964)	Libéral	Matane	1964	1st term
Bona Arsenault	Libéral	Matapédia	1960	2nd term
Pierre J. Maheux	Libéral	Mégantic	1960	2nd term
Jean-Jacques Bertrand	Union Nationale	Missisquoi	1948	5th term
Gérard Martin	Libéral	Montcalm	1962	1st term
Jean-Paul Cloutier	Union Nationale	Montmagny	1962	1st term
Albert Gervais	Union Nationale	Montmorency	1962	1st term
Aimé Brisson	Libéral	Montréal–Jeanne-Mance	1962	1st term
René Lévesque	Libéral	Montréal-Laurier	1960	2nd term
Jean-Baptiste Crépeau	Libéral	Montréal-Mercier	1962	1st term
Paul Earl	Libéral	Montréal–Notre-Dame-de-Grâce	1948	5th term
Eric Kierans (1963)	Libéral	Montréal–Notre-Dame-de-Grâce	1963	1st term
Georges-Émile Lapalme	Libéral	Montréal-Outremont	1953	4th term
Francis Hanley	Independent	Montréal–Sainte-Anne	1948	5th term
Edgar Charbonneau	Union Nationale	Montréal–Sainte-Marie	1956	3rd term
Philippe Lalonde	Libéral	Montréal–Saint-Henri	1952	4th term
Paul Dozois	Union Nationale	Montréal–Saint-Jacques	1956	3rd term
Harry Blank	Libéral	Montréal–Saint-Louis	1960	2nd term
George O'Reilly	Libéral	Montréal-Verdun	1960	2nd term
Claude Wagner (1964)	Libéral	Montréal-Verdun	1964	1st term
Laurier Baillargeon	Libéral	Napierville-Laprairie	1962	1st term
Germain Hébert	Libéral	Nicolet	1962	1st term
Roméo Lorrain	Union Nationale	Papineau	1935	9th term
Raymond Thomas Johnston	Union Nationale	Pontiac	1948	5th term
Marcellin Laroche	Libéral	Portneuf	1960	2nd term
Henri Beaupré	Libéral	Québec-Centre	1962	1st term
Jean-Jacques Bédard	Libéral	Québec-Comté	1952, 1960	3rd term*
Ernest Godbout	Libéral	Québec-Est	1962	1st term
Jean Lesage	Libéral	Québec-Ouest	1960	2nd term
Gérard Cournoyer	Libéral	Richelieu	1952, 1960	3rd term*
Émilien Lafrance	Libéral	Richmond	1952	4th term
Albert Dionne	Libéral	Rimouski	1956	3rd term
Alphonse Couturier	Libéral	Rivière-du-Loup	1956	3rd term
Joseph-Georges Gauthier	Union Nationale	Roberval	1962	1st term
François Boulais	Libéral	Rouville	1960	2nd term
Edgar Turpin	Libéral	Rouyn-Noranda	1956	3rd term
Rodrigue Thibault	Libéral	Saguenay	1962	1st term
Pierre-Willie Maltais (1964)	Libéral	Saguenay	1964	1st term
René Saint-Pierre	Libéral	Saint-Hyacinthe	1956	3rd term
Philodor Ouimet	Libéral	Saint-Jean	1960	2nd term
René Hamel	Libéral	Saint-Maurice	1952	4th term
Jean-Guy Trépanier (1965)	Libéral	Saint-Maurice	1965	1st term
Francis Boudreau	Union Nationale	Saint-Sauveur	1948	5th term
Armand Russell	Union Nationale	Shefford	1956	3rd term
Carrier Fortin	Libéral	Sherbrooke	1962	1st term
Georges Vaillancourt	Libéral	Stanstead	1960	2nd term
Gilbert-Roland Théberge	Libéral	Témiscamingue	1962	1st term
Antoine Raymond	Union Nationale	Témiscouata	1952	4th term
Lionel Bertrand	Libéral	Terrebonne	1960	2nd term
Denis Hardy (1965)	Libéral	Terrebonne	1965	1st term
Yves Gabias	Union Nationale	Trois-Rivières	1960	2nd term
Paul Gérin-Lajoie	Libéral	Vaudreuil-Soulanges	1960	2nd term
Guy Lechasseur	Libéral	Verchères	1960	2nd term
John Richard Hyde	Libéral	Westmount–Saint-Georges	1955	4th term
René Lavoie	Union Nationale	Wolfe	1962	1st term
Antonio Élie	Union Nationale	Yamaska	1931	10th term

== Other elected MLAs ==
Other MLAs were elected in by-elections during this mandate

- Eric William Kierans, Quebec Liberal Party, Montréal-Notre-Dame-de-Grâce, September 25, 1963
- Francis O'Farrell, Quebec Liberal Party, Dorchester, October 5, 1964
- Jacques Bernier, Quebec Liberal Party, Matane, October 5, 1964
- Pierre-Willie Maltais, Quebec Liberal Party, Saguenay, October 5, 1964
- Claude Wagner, Quebec Liberal Party, Montréal-Verdun, October 5, 1964
- Jean-Guy Trépanier, Quebec Liberal Party, Saint-Maurice, January 18, 1965
- Denis Hardy, Quebec Liberal Party, Terrebonne, January 18, 1965

== Cabinet Ministers ==
- Prime Minister and Executive Council President: Jean Lesage
- Vice-President of the Executive Council: Georges-Émile Lapalme (1962–1964), Paul Gerin-Lajoie (1964–1966)
- Agriculture and Colonization: Alcide Courcy
- Labour: René Hamel (1962–1963), Carrier Fortin (1963–1966)
- Public Works: René Saint-Pierre
- Cultural Affairs: Georges-Émile Lapalme (1962–1964), Pierre Laporte (1964–1966)
- Family and Social Welfare: Émilien Lafrance (1962–1965), René Lévesque (1965–1966)
- Youth: Paul Gérin-Lajoie (1962–1964)
  - Education: Paul Gérin-Lajoie (1964–1966)
- Health: Alphonse Couturier (1962–1965), Eric William Kierans (1965–1966)
- Lands and Forests: Bona Arsenault (1962), Lucien Cliche (1962–1966)
- Fisheries and Hunting: Gérard D. Levesque (1962–1963)
  - Tourism, Hunting and Fishing: Lionel Bertrand (1963–1964), Gérard Cournoyer (1964–1965), Alphonse Couturier (1965–1966)
- Natural Resources: René Lévesque (1962–1966), Gaston Binette (1966)
- Roads: Bernard Pinard
- Transportation and Communications: Gérard Cournoyer (1962–1964), Marie-Claire Kirkland (1964–1966)
- Municipal Affairs: Lucien Cliche (1962), Pierre Laporte (1962–1966)
- Federal-provincial Affairs: Jean Lesagex
- Industry and Commerce: André Rousseau (1962), Gérard D. Levesque (1962–1966)
- Attorney General: Georges-Émile Lapalme (1962–1963), René Hamel (1963–1964), Claude Wagner (1964–1965)
  - Justice: Claude Wagner (1965–1966)
- Solicitor General: Claude Wagner (1964–1966)
- Provincial Secretary: Lionel Bertrand (1962–1963), Bona Arsenault (1963–1966)
- Finances: Jean Lesage
- Revenu: Paul Earl (1962–1963), Jean Lesage (1963), Eric William Kierans (1963–1966)
- State Ministers: Carrier Fortin (1962–1963), Marie-Claire Kirkland (1962–1964), Gaston Binette (1965–1966), Albert Morissette (1965–1966), Gerard Cournoyer (1965–1966), Émilien Lafrance (1965–1966)

== New electoral districts ==
A major electoral map reform took place in 1965. The changes were effective starting in the 1966 election. Several ridings were also renamed.

- Parts of Laval were split into new ridings including Ahuntsic and Fabre
- Parts of Bourget were split to form Bourassa, Olier and LaFontaine
- Montréal-Notre-Dame-de-Grâce was renamed Notre-Dame-de-Grâce and parts of it were split to form D'Arcy-McGee.
- Montréal-Jeanne-Mance was renamed Jeanne-Mance and parts of it were split to form Dorion and Gouin.
- Dubuc was formed from parts of Chicoutimi.
- Parts of Jacques-Cartier were split to form Marguerite-Bourgeoys, Saint-Laurent and Robert-Baldwin.
- Montréal-Sainte-Anne was renamed Sainte-Anne.
- Montréal-Saint-Henri was renamed Sainte-Henri.
- Montréal-Saint-Jacques was renamed Sainte-Jacques.
- Montréal-Sainte-Marie was renamed Sainte-Marie.
- Westmount-Saint-Georges was renamed Westmount.
- Montréal-Saint-Louis was renamed Saint-Louis.
- Montréal-Verdun was renamed Verdun.
- Montréal-Laurier was renamed Laurier.
- Montréal-Outremont was renamed Outremont.
- Taillon was formed from parts of Chambly.
- Québec-Ouest was renamed Louis-Hébert.
- Québec-Est was renamed Limoilou.
- Québec County was renamed Chauveau.
- Québec-Centre was renamed Jean-Talon.
- Jonquiere-Kenogami was renamed Jonquière
