= Claude-Gilles Gosselin =

Canadian politician (1924–2016)

Member of the Legislative Assembly of Quebec for Compton
- In office 1957–1970
- Preceded by: Fabien Gagnon
- Succeeded by: Joseph-Omer Dionne

Personal details
- Born: March 12, 1924 East Angus, Quebec
- Died: August 18, 2016 (aged 92)
- Party: Union Nationale

Claude-Gilles Gosselin (March 12, 1924 – August 18, 2016) was a Canadian politician from Quebec.

== Background ==
Gosselin was born in East Angus and was a stock farmer.

== Member of the legislature ==
Gosselin supported the Union Nationale. He won a by-election in 1957 and became the Member of the National Assembly of Quebec (MNA) for the district of Compton.

He was re-elected in 1960, but his party lost the election against Jean Lesage's Liberals. Gosselin supported Jean-Jacques Bertrand over Daniel Johnson Sr. during the party leadership convention held in Quebec City on September 23, 1961.

Gosselin was re-elected in 1962 and 1966, but was defeated in 1970.

== Federal politics ==
He ran as a Progressive Conservative candidate for the district Mégantic-Compton-Stanstead in 1979, but finished a distant third.

== Retirement ==
After he retired from politics, Gosselin had a career in the private sector.
