= Mireille Jean =

Canadian politician

Member of the National Assembly of Quebec for Chicoutimi
- In office April 11, 2016 – August 29, 2018
- Preceded by: Stéphane Bédard
- Succeeded by: Andrée Laforest

Personal details
- Born: July 16, 1960 (age 66) Jonquière, Quebec, Canada
- Party: Parti Québécois

Mireille Jean (French pronunciation: [miʁɛj ʒɑ̃]; born July 16, 1960) is a Canadian politician, who was elected to the National Assembly of Quebec in a by-election on April 11, 2016. She represented the electoral district of Chicoutimi as a member of the Parti Québécois caucus until her defeat in the 2018 election.
