= Stéphane Bédard =

Canadian lawyer and politician (born 1968)

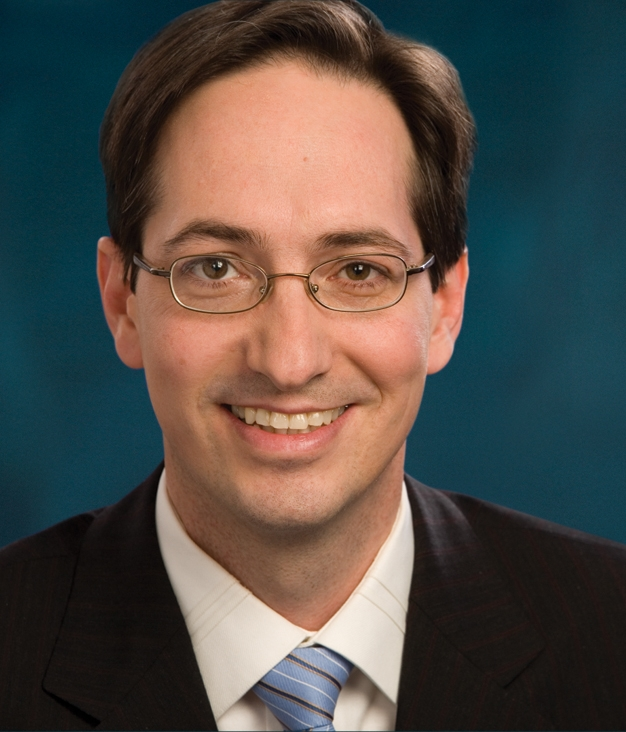

Leader of the Opposition in Quebec
- In office April 23, 2014 – May 15, 2015
- Preceded by: Philippe Couillard
- Succeeded by: Pierre Karl Péladeau

Interim Leader of the Parti Québécois
- In office June 7, 2014 – May 15, 2015
- Preceded by: Pauline Marois
- Succeeded by: Pierre Karl Péladeau

MNA for Chicoutimi
- In office December 15, 1998 – October 22, 2015
- Preceded by: Jeanne Blackburn
- Succeeded by: Mireille Jean

Personal details
- Born: March 11, 1968 (age 58) Chicoutimi, Quebec
- Party: Parti Québécois
- Spouse: Janick Tremblay
- Profession: Lawyer

Stéphane Bédard (born 11 March 1968) is a Canadian lawyer and politician. Bédard was interim leader of the Parti Québécois from 2014 to 2015. He was the Member of the National Assembly of Quebec for the provincial riding of Chicoutimi. He was chosen as interim parliamentary leader by the PQ caucus on April 10, 2014, following the PQ government's defeat in the 2014 general election and the resignation of Pauline Marois and officially became Leader of the Opposition when the legislature resumed on April 23, 2014. He officially became acting leader of the party on June 7, 2014, when Marois' resignation took effect at Parti Québécois Council of Presidents. He held the position until Pierre Karl Péladeau was elected party leader in the Parti Québécois leadership election held on May 15, 2015. He resigned from the legislature and the Parti Québécois on October 22, 2015.

== Biography ==
Born in Chicoutimi, Quebec, Stéphane Bédard is the son of Marc-André Bédard. After studying administration at HEC Montréal (1987-1988), he received a bachelor's degree in law at the Université de Montréal in 1991 and was admitted in 1992 at the Barreau du Québec. He was a lawyer from 1992 to 1998 in Chicoutimi. He was involved in politics during this period being the President of the Parti Québécois in Chicoutimi from 1994 to 1998 and was a member of the Yes Committee for the 1995 referendum.

Bédard ran for MNA in Chicoutimi in 1998 and was elected. While he was not named in a Ministry position, he was the Parliamentary assistant to the Minister of State for Education and Youth from March 21, 2001, to December 5, 2001, Parliamentary assistant to the Minister of State for Education and Employment from December 5, 2001, to January 30, 2002, and Parliamentary assistant to the Minister of State for Administration and the Public Service and Chair of the Conseil du trésor from January 30, 2002, to April 29, 2003. He was Secretary of State for the Renewal of the Public Service from January 30, 2002, to April 29, 2003.

Bédard was re-elected in 2003 but the Parti Québécois lost to the Quebec Liberal Party. He was named the Assistant Deputy Leader of the Opposition and after being re-elected for a third term in 2007, he was named the PQ's chief Whip. After the 2008, he was named the House leader of the opposition while being replaced by Pointe-aux-Trembles MNA Nicole Léger as Chief Whip of the PQ.

He was elected for a fifth term in the 2012 general election, as the Parti québécois regained power. On September 19, 2012, he became Minister responsible for Government Administration, Chair of the Conseil du trésor (Treasury Board), Government House Leader and Minister responsible for the Saguenay–Lac‑Saint-Jean region in the government of Premier Pauline Marois.

== Notes and references ==
Party political offices
Preceded by Pauline Marois	Leader of the Parti Québécois; Interim; 2014–2015	Succeeded by Pierre Karl Péladeau
Preceded by Michel Morin (Parti Québécois)	Parti Québécois Chief Whip; 2007–2008	Succeeded by Nicole Léger
National Assembly of Quebec
Preceded by François Gendron (PQ)	House Leader of the Second Opposition Group; 2008	No Second Opposition Group after 2008
Preceded by Sébastien Proulx (ADQ)	House Leader of the Official Opposition; 2008–2012	Succeeded by Pierre Moreau (Liberal)
