= Marc-André Bédard (politician) =

Canadian politician (1935–2020)

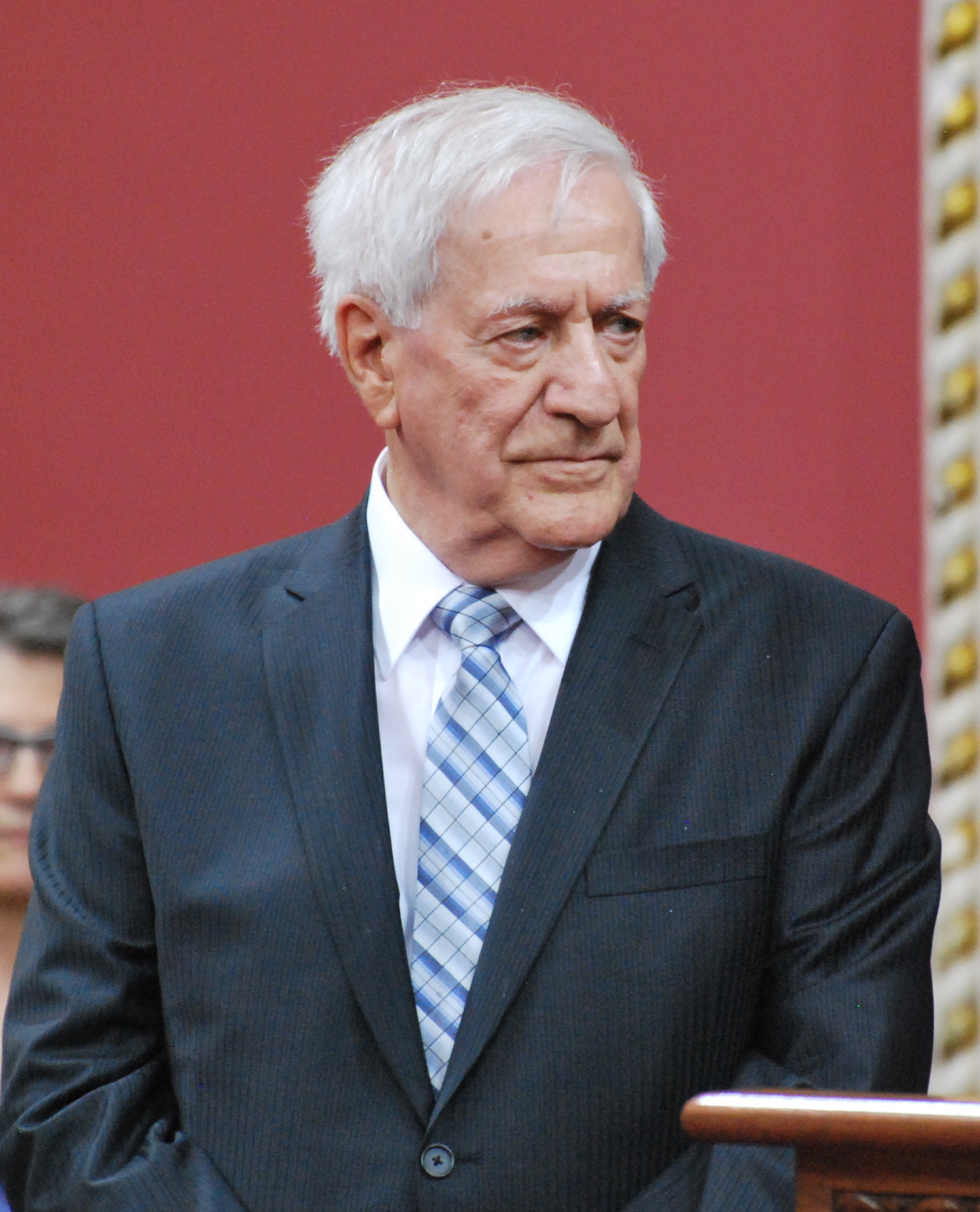
Marc-André Bédard in 2013

Marc-André Bédard (15 August 1935 – 25 November 2020) was a Canadian lawyer and politician. Born in Lac-à-la-Croix, Quebec, Bédard served in the National Assembly of Quebec from 1973 to 1985 and was Minister of Justice and Deputy Premier. Bédard was the father of politician Stéphane Bédard.

== Member of the legislature ==
Bédard unsuccessfully ran as the Parti Québécois candidate to the National Assembly of Quebec in 1970 in the district of Chicoutimi, finishing a close third with 30% of the vote. He was elected in 1973 and was re-elected in 1976 and 1981.

== Cabinet member ==
In 1976, Bédard was appointed to Premier René Lévesque's Cabinet. He was Quebec's longest-serving Minister of Justice from 26 November 1976 to 5 March 1984. From 1984 to 1985 he served as Deputy Premier of Quebec, and also as his party's House Leader. He did not run for re-election in 1985.

As Minister of Justice, in 1981 Bédard ordered the inquest into the 1964 death of John Watkins, the Canadian Ambassador to the Soviet Union.

== Separatist legacy ==
Bédard was instrumental in recruiting Lucien Bouchard to the separatist cause when he convinced the future Pequiste premier to abandon the Liberal party and become his personal communications director in 1973. As Justice Minister, Bédard appointed Bouchard to several high-profile commissions such as the Cliche Commission, from which Bouchard gained enormous fame.

Bédard tried to get Bouchard to succeed him as Pequiste candidate for Chicoutimi, but Bouchard refused, instead joining the Federal PC Party under the rising star of Brian Mulroney in 1988 as his Quebec lieutenant.

With the failure of the Meech Lake Accord in 1990, Bédard joined with Bernard Landry in lobbying the Quebec caucus of the PC party in Ottawa to bolt and establish their own political movement. Bouchard and several others answered the call and founded the Bloc Québécois.

== Retirement ==
Bédard was instrumental in having a statue of René Lévesque on the grounds of the Parliament of Quebec.

His son Stéphane was Member of the National Assembly of Quebec for the provincial riding of Chicoutimi from 1998 to 2015.

During the COVID-19 pandemic in Quebec, he died from COVID-19 on 25 November 2020, in the Saguenay borough of Chicoutimi.

== Footnotes ==
National Assembly of Quebec
Preceded by Jean-Noël Tremblay (Union Nationale)	MNA for Chicoutimi; 1973–1985	Succeeded by Jeanne L. Blackburn (Parti Québécois)
Political offices
Preceded by Camille Laurin	Deputy Premier of Quebec; 1984–1985	Succeeded by Lise Bacon
