= Alphonse Couturier (Liberal politician) =

Canadian politician

Member of the Legislative Assembly of Quebec for Rivière-du-Loup
- In office 1956–1966

Personal details
- Born: December 15, 1902
- Died: August 11, 1995 (aged 92)
- Party: Quebec Liberal Party
- Education: Université Laval
- Occupation: surgeon, politician
- Cabinet: Minister of Health (1960-1965); Minister of Tourism (1965-1966)

Alphonse Couturier (French pronunciation: [alfɔ̃s kutyʁje]; 15 December 1902 – 11 August 1995) was a Canadian member of the Legislative Assembly of Quebec for the Quebec Liberal Party.

He studied medicine at the Université Laval, becoming a doctor in 1930. He studied further at the Post Graduate Medical School in New York City. He obtained a specialist certificate in general surgery in 1951. He worked as a surgeon in Rivière-du-Loup, Quebec until 1970, and then in Quebec City until 1982.

He was a school commissioner in Rivière-du-Loup from 1942 to 1948. He first ran for the Legislative Assembly in Rivière-du-Loup electoral district in the 1952 Quebec general election for the Quebec Liberal Party, but was defeated. However, he was elected in 1956, and re-elected in 1960 and 1962, but was defeated in 1966. He was Minister of Health from 1960 to 1965, and Minister of Tourism from 1965 to 1966.
