= Jeanne Blackburn =

Canadian politician

Jeanne Larocque Blackburn was a politician in Quebec, Canada. She was a three-term Member of the National Assembly of Quebec.

== Background ==
She was born on June 24, 1934, in Saint-Elzéar-de-Bonaventure, and made career in education.

== Member of the legislature ==
Blackburn successfully ran as the Parti Québécois candidate to the National Assembly of Quebec in 1985 in the district of Chicoutimi. She was re-elected in 1989 and in 1994.

== Cabinet Member ==
In 1994, Blackburn was appointed to Premier Jacques Parizeau's Cabinet. She served as Minister of Income Security and Minister responsible for the Status of Women until Lucien Bouchard took over as Premier in 1996.

== Retirement ==
Blackburn served as chairperson for the Education Committee after 1996, but did not run for re-election in 1998.

== Footnotes ==
National Assembly of Quebec
| Preceded by Marc-André Bédard (Parti Québécois) | MNA for Chicoutimi; 1985–1998 | Succeeded by Stéphane Bédard (Parti Québécois) |
