= Arthur Larouche =

Canadian politician (1900–1968)

Member of the Legislative Assembly of Quebec for Chicoutimi
- In office 1935–1938
- Preceded by: Gustave Delisle
- Succeeded by: Antonio Talbot

Personal details
- Born: July 1, 1900 Chicoutimi, Quebec
- Died: July 10, 1968 (aged 68) Chicoutimi, Quebec
- Party: Union Nationale

Arthur Larouche (July 1, 1900 – July 10, 1968) was a politician Quebec, Canada and a Member of the Legislative Assembly of Quebec (MLA).

== Early life ==
He was born on July 1, 1900, in Chicoutimi, Saguenay-Lac-Saint-Jean.

== Municipal politics ==
Larouche served as a municipal councillor in Rivière-du-Moulin from 1932 to 1936.

== Member of the legislature ==
He ran as an Action libérale nationale candidate in the district of Chicoutimi in the 1935 provincial election and won. Larouche joined Maurice Duplessis's Union Nationale and was re-elected in the 1936 election. He resigned his seat and left provincial politics on April 13, 1938. He was succeeded by Antonio Talbot.

== Mayor ==
Larouche was the Mayor of Rivière-du-Moulin from 1952 to 1958.

== Death ==
He died on July 10, 1968.
