= Antoine Raymond =

Canadian politician

Joseph-Antoine Raymond

Member of the Legislative Assembly of Quebec for Témiscouata
- In office 1952–1966
- Preceded by: André Pelletier
- Succeeded by: Montcalm Simard

Personal details
- Born: September 22, 1902 Saint-Denis, near Kamouraska, Quebec, Canada
- Died: April 18, 1975 (aged 72) Notre-Dame-du-Lac, Quebec, Canada
- Party: Union Nationale

Joseph-Antoine Raymond (September 22, 1902 – April 18, 1975) was a Canadian politician and a four-term Member of the Legislative Assembly of Quebec.

== Background ==
He was born on September 22, 1902, near Kamouraska, Bas-Saint-Laurent and became a physician.

== Mayor ==
Raymond served as Mayor of Saint-Louis-du-Ha! Ha! from 1947 to 1964.

== Member of the legislature ==
He ran as a Union Nationale candidate in the 1952 election in the provincial district of Témiscouata and won. He was re-elected in the 1956, 1960 and 1962 elections, but he did not run for re-election in the 1966 election.

== Death ==
Raymond died on April 18, 1975.
