= Antonio Talbot =

Canadian politician (1900–1980)

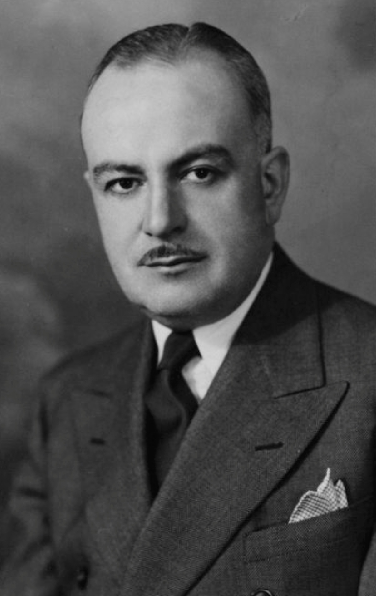

Member of the Legislative Assembly of Quebec for Chicoutimi
- In office 1938–1965
- Preceded by: Arthur Larouche
- Succeeded by: Jean-Noël Tremblay

Personal details
- Born: May 29, 1900 Saint-Pierre-de-la-Rivière-du-Sud, Quebec
- Died: September 25, 1980 (aged 80) Quebec City, Quebec
- Party: Union Nationale

Antonio Talbot (May 29, 1900 – September 25, 1980) was a Canadian politician from Quebec. He once served as interim leader of the Union Nationale.

== Background ==
He was born on May 29, 1900, in Saint-Pierre-de-la-Rivière-du-Sud, Quebec, near Montmagny, and was an attorney.

== Member of the legislature ==
Talbot won a by-election in 1938 and became the Union Nationale member for the district of Chicoutimi. He was re-elected to seven straight terms in 1939, 1944, 1948, 1952, 1956, 1960 and 1962.

== Cabinet Member ==
He was also a Cabinet minister from 1944 to 1960 under former Premiers Maurice Duplessis, Paul Sauve and Antonio Barrette.

== Party Leader ==
He replaced Yves Prévost as interim UN leader and leader of the Opposition after the latter had served in those capacities for a few months following the resignation of former Premier Antonio Barrette from the UN leadership.

In September 1961, Daniel Johnson Sr. was elected as the new leader of the Union Nationale, thereby replacing interim party leader Talbot as the leader of the Opposition.

== Retirement ==
Talbot resigned his seat in the legislature in 1965. He died on September 25, 1980.

== See also ==
- Politics of Quebec
- List of Quebec general elections
- List of Quebec leaders of the Opposition
- Timeline of Quebec history

Party political offices
Preceded by Yves Prévost (interim)	Leader of the Union Nationale (interim); 1961	Succeeded by Daniel Johnson Sr.
