= Jonquière-Kénogami =

Coordinates: 48.359°N 71.317°W

Quebec electoral district

Defunct provincial electoral district
- Legislature: National Assembly of Quebec
- District created: 1954
- District abolished: 1965
- First contested: 1956
- Last contested: 1962

Jonquière-Kénogami was a former provincial electoral district in the Saguenay–Lac-Saint-Jean region of Quebec, Canada that elected members to the Legislative Assembly of Quebec.

It was created for the 1956 election, from parts of the existing Chicoutimi and Lac-Saint-Jean electoral districts. Its final election was in 1962. It disappeared in the 1966 election and its successor electoral district was Jonquière.

== Members of the Legislative Assembly ==
1. Léonce Ouellet, Union Nationale (1956–1960)
2. Gérald Harvey, Liberal (1960–1966) (Was re-elected in Jonquière in 1966)

== Election history ==
1962 Quebec general election
Party	Candidate	Votes	%
Liberal	Gérald Harvey	16,100	60.38
Union Nationale	Léonce Ouellet	10,564	39.62
Total valid votes		26,664	98.70
Total rejected ballots		352	1.30
27,016		86.48	
Electors on the lists		31,241	–

1960 Quebec general election
Party	Candidate	Votes	%
Liberal	Gérald Harvey	15,310	56.86
Union Nationale	Léonce Ouellet	9,296	34.52
Independent	Laurent-Paul Bolduc	2,134	7.92
Liberal Republican	Jean-Marie Lessard	188	0.70
Total valid votes		26,928	98.22
Total rejected ballots		487	1.78
27,415		89.82	
Electors on the lists		30,521	–

1956 Quebec general election
Party	Candidate	Votes	%
Union Nationale	Léonce Ouellet	11,946	50.68
Independent	René Chaloult	11,626	49.32
Total valid votes		23,572	95.01
Total rejected ballots		1,239	4.99
24,811		88.00	
Electors on the lists		28,194	–
