= Chicoutimi (provincial electoral district) =

Provincial electoral district in Quebec, Canada

Coordinates: 48.419°N 71.051°W

Quebec electoral district

Provincial electoral district
- Legislature: National Assembly of Quebec
MNA
Marie-Karlynn Laflamme
Parti Québécois
- District created: 1912
- First contested: 1912
- Last contested: 2026

Demographics
- Electors (2016): 46,626
- Area (km²): 172.6
- Census division: Le Saguenay-et-son-Fjord (part)
- Census subdivision: Saguenay (part)

Chicoutimi is a provincial electoral district in the Saguenay–Lac-Saint-Jean region of Quebec, Canada, that elects members to the National Assembly of Quebec. The district is located within the city of Saguenay and consists of part of the borough of Chicoutimi; it corresponds exactly to the territory of the former city of Chicoutimi prior to its February 18, 2002, amalgamation into the newly formed city of Saguenay.

It was created for the 1912 election from a part of Chicoutimi-Saguenay electoral district.

The riding has had the same boundaries since the 1988 redistribution (when it gained 57 voters from Dubuc), and have not been altered significantly since the 1972 redistribution, when it gained part of Dubuc.

== Members of the Legislative Assembly / National Assembly ==
Legislature	Years	Member	Party
Riding created from Chicoutimi-Saguenay
13th	1912–1916	Honoré Petit	Liberal
14th	1916–1919	Honoré Petit	Liberal
15th	1919–1923	Joseph-Arthur Gaudrault	Liberal
16th	1923–1927	Gustave Delisle	Liberal
17th	1927–1931	Gustave Delisle	Liberal
18th	1931–1935	Gustave Delisle	Liberal
19th	1935–1936	Arthur Larouche	Action libérale nationale
20th	1936–1938	Arthur Larouche	Union Nationale
20th	1938–1939	Antonio Talbot	Union Nationale
21st	1939–1944	Antonio Talbot	Union Nationale
22nd	1944–1948	Antonio Talbot	Union Nationale
23rd	1948–1952	Antonio Talbot	Union Nationale
24th	1952–1956	Antonio Talbot	Union Nationale
25th	1956–1960	Antonio Talbot	Union Nationale
26th	1960–1962	Antonio Talbot	Union Nationale
27th	1962–1965	Antonio Talbot	Union Nationale
28th	1966–1970	Jean-Noël Tremblay	Union Nationale
29th	1970–1973	Jean-Noël Tremblay	Union Nationale
30th	1973–1976	Marc-André Bédard	Parti Québécois
31st	1976–1981	Marc-André Bédard	Parti Québécois
32nd	1981–1985	Marc-André Bédard	Parti Québécois
33rd	1985–1989	Jeanne Blackburn	Parti Québécois
34th	1989–1994	Jeanne Blackburn	Parti Québécois
35th	1994–1998	Jeanne Blackburn	Parti Québécois
36th	1998–2003	Stéphane Bédard	Parti Québécois
37th	2003–2007	Stéphane Bédard	Parti Québécois
38th	2007–2008	Stéphane Bédard	Parti Québécois
39th	2008–2012	Stéphane Bédard	Parti Québécois
40th	2012–2014	Stéphane Bédard	Parti Québécois
41st	2014–2015	Stéphane Bédard	Parti Québécois
41st	2016–2018	Mireille Jean	Parti Québécois
42nd	2018–2022	Andrée Laforest	Coalition Avenir Québec
43rd	2022–2025	Andrée Laforest	Coalition Avenir Québec
43rd	2026–2026	Marie-Karlynn Laflamme	Parti Québécois
44th	2026–Present	Marie-Karlynn Laflamme	Parti Québécois

== Election results ==
2026 Quebec general election
** Preliminary results — Not yet official **
Party	Candidate	Votes	%	±%
Parti Québécois	Marie-Karlynn Laflamme	11,858	39.39	–5.96
Conservative	Gabriella-Myriam Mathieu	5,522	18.34	–7.73
Coalition Avenir Québec	Sandra Larouche	4,956	16.46	+4.49
Liberal	Jean-Marc Allard	4,408	14.64	+5.51
Québec solidaire	Jeanne Palardy	2,965	9.85	+4.26
Climat Québec	Olivier Dion	206	0.68	–0.76
Libertarian	Charles Olivier	191	0.63	N/A
Total valid votes		30,106	98.79	+0.26
Total rejected ballots		370	1.21	–0.26
Turnout		30,476	66.46	+32.24
Electors on the lists		45,858		
Parti Québécois hold		Swing		+0.89
Source: Élections Québec

Quebec provincial by-election, February 23, 2026 Resignation of Andrée Laforest (September 4, 2025)
Party	Candidate	Votes	%	±%
Parti Québécois	Marie-Karlynn Laflamme	6,999	45.35	+31.14
Conservative	Catherine Morissette	4,023	26.07	+17.64
Coalition Avenir Québec	Francis Tremblay	1,848	11.97	−50.30
Liberal	Tricia Murray	1,409	9.13	+6.09
Québec solidaire	Jeanne Palardy	862	5.59	−6.46
Climat Québec	Olivier Dion	223	1.44	—
Parti populaire	François Sabourin	69	0.45	—
Total valid votes		15,433	98.53	
Total rejected ballots		230	1.47	+0.13
Turnout		15,663	34.22	-34.51
Electors		45,778		
Parti Québécois gain from Coalition Avenir Québec		Swing		+40.72
Source: Élections Québec

2022 Quebec general election
Party	Candidate	Votes	%	±%
Coalition Avenir Québec	Andrée Laforest	19,345	62.28	+23.02
Parti Québécois	Alice Villeneuve	4,415	14.21	–10.75
Québec solidaire	Adrien Guibert-Barthez	3,741	12.04	–0.84
Conservative	Éric Girard	2,619	8.43	+7.05
Liberal	Gabriel Caron	943	3.04	–16.70
Total valid votes		31,063	98.66	
Total rejected ballots		421	1.34	–0.57
Turnout		31,484	68.73	+0.20
Electors on the lists		45,810		
Coalition Avenir Québec hold		Swing		+16.88
Source: Élections Québec

2018 Quebec general election
Party	Candidate	Votes	%	±%
Coalition Avenir Québec	Andrée Laforest	12,123	39.26	+27.57
Parti Québécois	Mireille Jean	7,707	24.96	-21.76
Liberal	Marie-Josée Morency	6,094	19.74	-10.49
Québec solidaire	Pierre Dostie	3,977	12.88	+4.88
Green	Tommy Philippe	551	1.78	-0.68
Conservative	Léonard Gagnon	426	1.38	–
Total valid votes		30,878	98.09	
Total rejected ballots		601	1.91	+0.32
Turnout		31,479	68.53	+27.43
Eligible voters		45,937		
Coalition Avenir Québec gain from Parti Québécois		Swing		+24.66
Source(s) "Résultats des élections générales du 1er octobre 2018". Élections Québec.

Quebec provincial by-election, April 11, 2016 Resignation of Stéphane Bédard
Party	Candidate	Votes	%	±%
Parti Québécois	Mireille Jean	8,810	46.72	+12.23
Liberal	Francyne Gobeil	5,700	30.23	+0.66
Coalition Avenir Québec	Hélène Girard	2,205	11.69	-5.76
Québec solidaire	Pierre Dostie	1,508	8.00	+1.54
Green	Alex Tyrrell	465	2.47	–
Option nationale	Catherine Bouchard-Tremblay	170	0.90	-0.10
Total valid votes		18,858	98.41	
Total rejected ballots		305	1.59	-0.08
Turnout		19,163	41.10	-29.48
Electors on the lists		46,630	–	
Parti Québécois hold		Swing		+5.78

2014 Quebec general election
Party	Candidate	Votes	%	±%
Parti Québécois	Stéphane Bédard	11,245	34.48	-10.02
Liberal	Michel Mallette	9,640	29.56	+7.19
Coalition Avenir Québec	Steven Fleurent	5,691	17.45	-7.56
Independent	Marc Pettersen	3,601	11.04	–
Québec solidaire	Réjean Godin	2,105	6.46	+1.50
Option nationale	Philippe Gosselin	327	1.00	-0.91
Total valid votes		32,609	98.32	
Total rejected ballots		556	1.68	+0.44
Turnout		33,165	70.57	-6.19
Electors on the lists		46,993	–	
Parti Québécois hold		Swing		-8.61

2012 Quebec general election
Party	Candidate	Votes	%	±%
Parti Québécois	Stéphane Bédard	15,768	44.51	-1.45
Coalition Avenir Québec	Alix Boivin	8,861	25.01	+16.56
Liberal	Carol Néron	7,925	22.37	-19.19
Québec solidaire	Pierre Dostie	1,755	4.95	+0.93
Option nationale	Catherine Bouchard-Tremblay	679	1.92	
Middle Class	Simon Lavoie	440	1.24	
Total valid votes		35,428	98.77	
Total rejected ballots		443	1.23	-0.13
Turnout		35,871	76.77	+13.05
Electors on the lists		46,727	–	
Parti Québécois hold		Swing		-9.00
Coalition Avenir Québec result compared to Action démocratique du Québec

2008 Quebec general election
Party	Candidate	Votes	%	±%
Parti Québécois	Stéphane Bédard	13,400	45.96	+5.98
Liberal	Joan Simard	12,118	41.56	+4.58
Action démocratique	Jean-Philippe Marin	2,465	8.45	-9.16
Québec solidaire	Réjean Godin	1,174	4.03	+0.90
Total valid votes		29,157	98.63	
Total rejected ballots		404	1.37	+0.53
Turnout		29,561	63.71	-12.73
Electors on the lists		46,397	–	
Parti Québécois hold		Swing		+0.70

2007 Quebec general election
Party	Candidate	Votes	%	±%
Parti Québécois	Stéphane Bédard	13,965	39.97	-3.73
Liberal	André Harvey	12,919	36.98	+1.30
Action démocratique	Luc Picard	6,155	17.62	-0.02
Québec solidaire	Colette Fournier	1,093	3.13	+1.11
Green	Daniel Fortin	803	2.30	–
Total valid votes		34,935	99.17	
Total rejected ballots		293	0.83	-0.10
Turnout		35,228	76.45	+4.56
Electors on the lists		46,081	–	
Parti Québécois hold		Swing		-2.52
Québec solidaire result compared to Union des forces progressistes

2003 Quebec general election
Party	Candidate	Votes	%	±%
Parti Québécois	Stéphane Bédard	14,471	43.71	-13.56
Liberal	Jean-Guy Maltais	11,814	35.68	+7.15
Action démocratique	Carl Savard	5,841	17.64	+4.31
UFP	Pierre Dostie	670	2.02	+1.52
Bloc Pot	Dominic Tremblay	314	0.95	
Total valid votes		33,110	99.07	
Total rejected ballots		310	0.93	-0.07
Turnout		33,420	71.89	-2.93
Electors on the lists		46,486	–	
Parti Québécois hold		Swing		-10.35
Union des forces progressistes result compared to Parti de la démocratie socialiste

1998 Quebec general election
Party	Candidate	Votes	%	±%
Parti Québécois	Stéphane Bédard	19,980	57.26	-6.29
Liberal	Marina Larouche	9,955	28.53	+2.50
Action démocratique	Carl Savard	4,653	13.34	+5.78
Socialist Democracy	Jean-Guy Tremblay	177	0.51	-1.53
Independent	Stéphane Guy Maurice Gagnon	127	0.36	
Total valid votes		34,892	99.01	
Total rejected ballots		350	0.99	-0.10
Turnout		35,242	74.82	-3.45
Electors on the lists		47,102	–	
Parti Québécois hold		Swing		-4.40
Parti de la démocratie socialiste result compared to New Democratic Party of Quebec

1995 Quebec referendum
Side	Votes	%
Oui	29,305	68.87
Non	13,245	31.13

1994 Quebec general election
Party	Candidate	Votes	%	±%
Parti Québécois	Jeanne L. Blackburn	22,025	63.55	+7.74
Liberal	Rémi Hamel	9,021	26.03	-14.53
Action démocratique	Réal Barrette	2,619	7.56	
New Democratic	Gervais Tremblay	706	2.04	-0.79
Natural Law	Claire Desmeules	285	0.82	
Total valid votes		34,656	98.90	
Total rejected ballots		384	1.10	-0.38
Turnout		35,040	78.27	+2.72
Electors on the lists		44,767	–	
Parti Québécois hold		Swing		+11.13

1992 Charlottetown Accord referendum
Side	Votes	%
Non	27,429	74.43
Oui	9,423	25.57

1989 Quebec general election
Party	Candidate	Votes	%	±%
Parti Québécois	Jeanne L. Blackburn	18,047	55.81	+2.71
Liberal	Jean-Claude Beaulieu	13,114	40.56	-1.12
New Democratic	Gervais Tremblay	914	2.83	-1.52
Socialist Movement	Pénélope Guay	260	0.80	+0.30
Total valid votes		32,335	98.53	
Total rejected ballots		484	1.47	+0.58
Turnout		32,819	75.55	-1.01
Electors on the lists		43,440	–	
Parti Québécois hold		Swing		+1.91

1985 Quebec general election
Party	Candidate	Votes	%	±%
Parti Québécois	Jeanne L. Blackburn	17,476	53.11	-20.80
Liberal	Francois Tremblay	13,716	41.68	+17.04
New Democratic	Normand Letendre	1,429	4.34	
Socialist Movement	Élie Simard	167	0.51	
Christian Socialist	André Filion	119	0.36	
Total valid votes		32,907	99.11	
Total rejected ballots		296	0.89	-0.51
Turnout		33,203	76.56	-3.57
Electors on the lists		43,368	–	
Parti Québécois hold		Swing		-19.42

1981 Quebec general election
Party	Candidate	Votes	%	±%
Parti Québécois	Marc-André Bédard	24,456	73.91	+11.40
Liberal	Louise Paré	7,824	23.64	+2.76
Union Nationale	Robert Lacroix	811	2.45	-10.96
Total valid votes		33,091	98.59	
Total rejected ballots		472	1.41	-0.17
Turnout		33,563	80.13	-8.42
Electors on the lists		41,885	–	
Parti Québécois hold		Swing		+4.32

1980 Quebec referendum
Side	Votes	%
Oui	19,980	58.51
Non	14,170	41.49

1976 Quebec general election
Party	Candidate	Votes	%	±%
Parti Québécois	Marc-André Bédard	20,638	62.51	+20.36
Liberal	Roch Bergeron	6,896	20.89	-17.74
Union Nationale	Léopold Decoste	4,429	13.41	-1.14
Ralliement créditiste	Richard Nareau	1,053	3.19	-1.48
Total valid votes		33,016	98.43	
Total rejected ballots		528	1.57	+0.04
Turnout		33,544	88.55	+4.70
Electors on the lists		37,880	–	
Parti Québécois hold		Swing		+19.05
Ralliement créditiste du Québec result compared to Parti créditiste

1973 Quebec general election
Party	Candidate	Votes	%	±%
Parti Québécois	Marc-André Bédard	12,359	42.14	+11.90
Liberal	Marcel Claveau	11,328	38.63	+7.36
Union Nationale	Jean-Noël Tremblay	4,268	14.55	-22.19
Parti créditiste	Henri-Paul Brassard	1,370	4.67	+2.93
Total valid votes		29,325	98.47	
Total rejected ballots		457	1.53	
Turnout		29,782	83.86	
Electors on the lists		35,515	–	
Parti Québécois gain from Union Nationale		Swing		+17.05
Parti créditiste result compared to Ralliement créditiste

1970 Quebec general election
Party	Candidate	Votes	%	±%
Union Nationale	Jean-Noël Tremblay	8,614	36.74	-12.95
Liberal	Adrien Plourde	7,331	31.27	-8.54
Parti Québécois	Marc-André Bédard	7,090	30.24	+19.75
Ralliement créditiste	Francois Rondeau	409	1.74	
Total valid votes		23,444	98.54	
Total rejected ballots		348	1.46	
Turnout		23,792	87.80	
Electors on the lists		27,097	–	
Union Nationale hold		Swing		-2.21
Parti Québécois result compared to Ralliement national

1966 Quebec general election
Party	Candidate	Votes	%	±%
Union Nationale	Jean-Noël Tremblay	9,824	49.70	-0.59
Liberal	Jacques Riverin	7,870	39.81	-9.90
Ralliement national	Jules Larouche	2,074	10.49	
Total valid votes		19,768	98.24	
Total rejected ballots		354	1.76	
Turnout		20,122	81.48	
Electors on the lists		24,696	–	
Union Nationale hold		Swing		+4.66

1962 Quebec general election
Party	Candidate	Votes	%	±%
Union Nationale	Antonio Talbot	16,910	50.29	-1.03
Liberal	Rosaire Gauthier	16,718	49.71	+1.03
Total valid votes		33,628	99.11	
Total rejected ballots		301	0.89	
Turnout		33,929	88.05	
Electors on the lists		38,534	–	
Union Nationale hold		Swing		-1.03

1960 Quebec general election
Party	Candidate	Votes	%	±%
Union Nationale	Antonio Talbot	16,749	51.32	-15.90
Liberal	Rosaire Gauthier	15,889	48.68	+15.90
Total valid votes		32,638	98.91	
Total rejected ballots		359	1.09	+0.10
Turnout		32,997	89.96	+2.72
Electors on the lists		36,678	–	
Union Nationale hold		Swing		-15.90
Source(s) Sayers, Anthony. "1960 Quebec Election". Canadian Elections Database.

1956 Quebec general election
Party	Candidate	Votes	%	±%
Union Nationale	Antonio Talbot	19,103	67.22	-17.18
Liberal	Joseph-Henri Gaudreault	9,315	32.78	+17.18
Total valid votes		28,418	99.01	
Total rejected ballots		285	0.99	-0.07
Turnout		28,703	87.25	+22.25
Electors on the lists		32,899	–	
Union Nationale hold		Swing		-17.18
Source(s) Sayers, Anthony. "1956 Quebec Election". Canadian Elections Database.

1952 Quebec general election
Party	Candidate	Votes	%	±%
Union Nationale	Antonio Talbot	29,572	84.40	+26.58
Independent Liberal	Joseph-Henri Gaudreault	5,466	15.60	-2.59
Total valid votes		35,038	98.94	
Total rejected ballots		375	1.06	+0.34
Turnout		35,413	65.00	-20.69
Electors on the lists		54,483	–	
Union Nationale hold		Swing		+14.58
Independent Liberal compared to Liberal
Source(s) Sayers, Anthony. "1952 Quebec Election". Canadian Elections Database.

1948 Quebec general election
Party	Candidate	Votes	%	±%
Union Nationale	Antonio Talbot	23,602	57.82	+7.33
Ralliement créditiste	Pierre Bouchard	9,796	24.00	+17.44
Liberal	Jean Pelletier	7,424	18.19	-6.97
Total valid votes		40,822	99.28	
Total rejected ballots		296	0.72	-0.13
Turnout		41,118	85.69	+6.57
Electors on the lists		47,983	–	
Union Nationale hold		Swing		-5.05
Source(s) Sayers, Anthony. "1948 Quebec Election". Canadian Elections Database.

1944 Quebec general election
Party	Candidate	Votes	%	±%
Union Nationale	Antonio Talbot	17,752	50.49	-0.10
Liberal	Jules Gauthier	8,846	25.16	-12.40
Bloc populaire	J. Ernest Bergeron	6,256	17.79	
Union des électeurs	Pierre Bouchard	2,307	6.56	
Total valid votes		35,161	99.15	
Total rejected ballots		300	0.85	+0.06
Turnout		35,461	79.12	+1.73
Electors on the lists		44,818	–	
Union Nationale hold		Swing		+6.15
Source(s) Sayers, Anthony. "1944 Quebec Election". Canadian Elections Database.

1939 Quebec general election
Party	Candidate	Votes	%	±%
Union Nationale	Antonio Talbot	5,968	50.59	-7.20
Liberal	J. Elzéar Dufour	4,431	37.56	
Action libérale nationale	Philippe Grenier	1,398	11.85	
Total valid votes		11,797	99.21	
Total rejected ballots		94	0.79	
Turnout		11,891	77.39	
Electors on the lists		15,365	–	
Union Nationale hold		Swing		-22.28
Source(s) Sayers, Anthony. "1939 Quebec Election". Canadian Elections Database.

Quebec provincial by-election, May 25, 1938 Resignation of Arthur Larouche
Party	Candidate	Votes	%	±%
Union Nationale	Antonio Talbot	5,623	57.78	-16.80
Independent Union Nationale	Alfred Tremblay	3,129	32.15	
Independent	Louis Joseph-Henri Duhaime dit Lemaître	979	10.06	
Total valid votes		9,731	99.27	
Total rejected ballots		34	0.73	
Turnout		9,803	68.47	
Electors on the lists		14,317	–	
Union Nationale hold		Swing		-24.48

1936 Quebec general election
Party	Candidate	Votes	%	±%
Union Nationale	Arthur Larouche	8,277	74.59	+1.99
Liberal	Jules-Robert Tremblay	2,820	25.41	-1.99
Total valid votes		11,097	99.69	
Total rejected ballots		34	0.31	-1.06
Turnout		11,131	78.61	+2.36
Electors on the lists		14,159	–	
Union Nationale hold		Swing		+1.99
Source(s) Sayers, Anthony. "1936 Quebec Election". Canadian Elections Database.

1935 Quebec general election
Party	Candidate	Votes	%	±%
Action libérale nationale	Arthur Larouche	7,484	72.60	
Liberal	Roland Fradette	2,825	27.40	-16.18
Total valid votes		10,309	98.63	
Total rejected ballots		143	1.37	+0.92
Turnout		10,452	76.25	+4.57
Electors on the lists		13,707	–	
Action libérale nationale gain from Liberal		Swing		+44.39
Source(s) Sayers, Anthony. "1935 Quebec Election". Canadian Elections Database.

1931 Quebec general election
Party	Candidate	Votes	%	±%
Liberal	Gustave Delisle	4,123	43.58	-37.93
Conservative	Joseph-Adam Lavergne	2,675	28.27	+9.79
Independent	Pierre Vézina	2,663	28.15	
Total valid votes		9,461	99.55	
Total rejected ballots		43	0.45	-1.18
Turnout		9,504	71.69	+17.02
Electors on the lists		13,258	–	
Liberal hold		Swing		-23.86
Source(s) Sayers, Anthony. "1931 Quebec Election". Canadian Elections Database.

1927 Quebec general election
Party	Candidate	Votes	%
Liberal	Gustave Delisle	4,850	81.51
Conservative	Lazare Vaillancourt	1,100	18.49
Total valid votes		5,950	98.36
Total rejected ballots		99	1.64
Turnout		6,049	54.66
Electors on the lists		11,066	–

1923 Quebec general election
Party	Candidate	Votes	%
Liberal	Gustave Delisle	2,446	45.94
Independent Liberal	Joseph-Arthur Gaudreault	2,174	40.83
Conservative	Pierre Bergeron	704	13.22
Total valid votes		5,322	98.50
Total rejected ballots		81	1.50
Turnout		5,405	60.48
Electors on the lists		8,937	–

1919 Quebec general election
Party	Candidate	Votes	%
Liberal	Joseph-Arthur Gaudreault	2,645	51.79
Independent Liberal	Honoré Petit	2,462	48.21
Total valid votes		5,107	99.92
Total rejected ballots		4	0.08
Turnout		5,111	68.71
Electors on the lists		7,438	–

1916 Quebec general election
Party	Candidate	Votes	%
Liberal	Honoré Petit	2,492	55.45
Conservative	Gustave Delisle	2,002	44.55
Total valid votes		4,494	99.45
Total rejected ballots		25	0.55
Turnout		4,519	66.90
Electors on the lists		6,755	–

1912 Quebec general election
Party	Candidate	Votes	%
Liberal	Honoré Petit	1,914	57.19
Conservative	Gustave Delisle	1,433	42.81
Total valid votes		3,347	99.35
Total rejected ballots		22	0.65
Turnout		3,369	66.90
Electors on the lists		5,558	–

== See also ==
- List of Quebec provincial electoral districts
- Canadian provincial electoral districts
