= Guy Lechasseur =

Canadian politician

Guy Lechasseur (French pronunciation: [ɡi ləʃasœʁ]; January 24, 1916 – February 11, 2005) was a Quebec politician. He represented the constituency of Verchères in the Quebec National Assembly from 1960 to 1970 as a member of the Quebec Liberal Party and served as Speaker of the Assembly from 1965 to 1966.

Lechasseur served in the Canadian Army with the Les Voltigeurs de Québec and saw action in France and the Netherlands completing World War II with the rank of major. He returned to Canada and studied law at Laval University becoming a lawyer in 1946.

Aside from serving as Speaker, he also held several positions as parliamentary assistant to various ministers. He retired from the Assembly in 1970 to accept a judicial position with the provincial court where he served until his retirement in 1986.
