= Daniel Johnson Sr. =

Premier of Quebec from 1966 to 1968

The Honourable Daniel Johnson Sr. PC
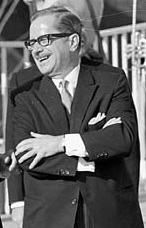
- Francis Daniel Johnson

20th Premier of Quebec
- In office June 16, 1966 – September 26, 1968
- Monarch: Elizabeth II
- Lieutenant Governor: Hugues Lapointe
- Deputy: Jean-Jacques Bertrand
- Preceded by: Jean Lesage
- Succeeded by: Jean-Jacques Bertrand

Leader of the Union Nationale
- In office September 23, 1961 – September 26, 1968
- Preceded by: Antonio Talbot
- Succeeded by: Jean-Jacques Bertrand

Minister of Hydraulic Resources
- In office April 30, 1958 – July 5, 1960
- Premier: Maurice Duplessis; Paul Sauvé; Antonio Barrette
- Preceded by: John Samuel Bourque
- Succeeded by: René Lévesque

Member of the Legislative Assembly for Bagot
- In office December 18, 1946 – September 26, 1968
- Preceded by: Cyrille Dumaine
- Succeeded by: Jean-Guy Cardinal

Personal details
- Born: Francis Daniel Johnson; April 9, 1915 Danville, Quebec, Canada
- Died: September 26, 1968 (aged 53) Manicouagan, Quebec, Canada
- Party: Union Nationale
- Spouse: Reine Gagné (m. 1943)
- Children: 4, including Daniel Jr., Pierre-Marc
- Profession: Lawyer

Francis Daniel Johnson Sr. PC (April 9, 1915 – September 26, 1968) was a Canadian politician and the 20th premier of Quebec from 1966 until his death in 1968.

Leader of the traditionalist wing of the Union Nationale turned defender of the expanding welfare state, Daniel Johnson was a major figure of two epochs that mark Quebec's modern history: the Great Darkness and the Quiet Revolution.

Elected at the age of 31 as the Member of the Legislative Assembly for the provincial riding of Bagot in 1946, Johnson quickly became the figurehead of the up-and-coming generation within the aging Union Nationale. After having served in multiple different roles under Maurice Duplessis's government, including as parliamentary secretary to Duplessis himself and as deputy speaker of the Legislative Assembly, Johnson was appointed as the Minister of Hydraulic Resources in 1958. During his time as minister, he most notably launched the construction of the Manic-5 dam. He became the leader of Union Nationale in 1961 and consequently became the leader of the official opposition to Jean Lesage's ruling Liberal Party. He would occupy this role for an additional five years after failing to win the 1962 election.

The Union Nationale was finally returned to power in the 1966 election, making Johnson the 20th premier of Quebec. However, the party that would now go on to form a majority government bore little resemblance to the one of Maurice Duplessis, having broken with its traditional anti-statism and anti-intellectualism under Johnson's leadership. His administration was also the first in Quebec history to open up the door to Quebec separatism, while still not explicitly endorsing it. During Johnson's premiership, Quebec's relationship with France underwent a rapprochement due to his close collaboration with the French president, Charles de Gaulle, who visited Quebec in 1967 at Premier Johnson's behest, whereupon de Gaulle gave his Vive le Québec libre speech.

In September 1968, while still in the midst of his reforms in health, education, the economy, and the constitution, Johnson died in office following a heart attack. He is the father of Pierre Marc Johnson and Daniel Johnson Jr., who each later briefly served as premier of Quebec, with Pierre Marc heading the Parti Québécois and Daniel Jr. heading the rival Quebec Liberal Party.

== Background ==
Johnson was born in the town of Danville, located in the Eastern Townships region of Quebec. He was the eldest son of Francis Johnson, an anglophone labourer of Irish heritage, and Marie-Adéline Daniel, a French Canadian. He was raised bilingually but educated entirely in French.

His father, Francis, was politically active in the Conservative Party of Quebec, which at the time was the opposition party to the governing Liberal Party of Quebec. However, due to rampant patronage, this support cost Francis his job and prevented him from receiving social welfare assistance. As a result, he was reduced to scrounging together what odd jobs he could find in order to make ends meet. With eight children to feed, this precarity put the family under great financial strain. Despite the environment of familial solidarity and religious piety that Daniel Johnson grew up in, the poverty and deprivations of his youth would leave a lasting imprint.

=== Education ===
In 1928, Daniel Johnson started high school at Collège Antoine-Girouard in Saint-Hyacinthe. A brilliant student with an excellent memory, he frequently found himself among the top of his class. He also leveraged his natural sociability to cultivate relationships and participate in extracurricular activities, most notably the literary circle affiliated with the Catholic French-Canadian Youth Association. During this time, Johnson met Jean-Jacques Bertrand, a student with whom he would later share a political destiny.

Johnson initially intended to study to become a priest. His family was still penniless, but with the financial help of a generous benefactress, who was a widowed friend of his mother's, Daniel Johnson was able to enter the Grand Séminaire in the fall of 1935. However, while he was in seminary, Quebec was plunged into the worst economic crisis in its history. The context of the Great Depression led the young Johnson to take an acute interest in social, economic, and political issues. Three events then coincided to make him reconsider the priesthood altogether: the creation of a new party, the Union Nationale, by Maurice Duplessis; the defeat of the Liberal Party at the hands of the Union Nationale in the 1936 election; and the death of Johnson's mother by tuberculosis.

In September 1937, he finally decided to abandon his studies in theology and opt for law instead. However, with the first semester of university having already started at that point, he had to obtain special permission from the president of the bar of Quebec. In 1937, the president was none other than Maurice Duplessis himself, leading to the first meeting between Johnson and Premier Duplessis. After being granted special permission, Daniel Johnson entered the faculty of law at the University of Montreal in fall 1937. True to form, Daniel Johnson became involved in many extracurricular activities during his time at university, including the Federation of Catholic students (French: Fédération des étudiants catholiques) and the Canadian Union for Young Catholics (French: Union des jeunesses catholiques du Canada). He was also elected president of the students' union of the University of Montreal, and wrote for the student newspaper, called Le Quartier Latin. He participated in international conferences held by groups such as World Student Relief, an organization responsible for aid to prisoners of war and student victims of war, as well as Pax Romana, an organization seeking to promote international cooperation between Catholic students. Finally, like the majority of young people in his generation in Quebec, he participated in activism against conscription in the Second World War.

=== Personal life ===
In 1943, Johnson married Reine Gagné (1918–1994). The two had met at university, where Gagné was studying literature and contributing to the same student newspaper that Johnson was involved with. While she encouraged his participation in politics, knowing how important it was to him, she had reservations about the impact of his fervent dedication and consequent frequent absences on their young family, saying that she had "just lost her husband" on the night of Johnson's first electoral victory in 1946. In 1953, she survived being shot twice by her extramarital lover, Radio-Canada announcer Bertrand Dussault, who then committed suicide.

Johnson and his wife had four children: two sons and two daughters. Both of his sons, Pierre-Marc Johnson and Daniel Johnson Jr., also served as premiers of Quebec. Each was a leader of a different party and each lasted less than a year as premier, Pierre-Marc as leader of the sovereigntist Parti Québécois for a brief period in 1985, and Daniel Jr. as leader of the federalist Liberal Party of Quebec for nine months in 1994. Each was voted out in a general election after becoming leader of their respective parties.

== Career ==
=== Lawyer and Union Nationale activist ===
In the 1939 provincial election, Daniel Johnson was invited by a former classmate, André Dumont, to participate in the Union Nationale's campaign in the riding of Bagot. (Note: André Dumont's uncle, Edmour Gagnon, was an organizer for the Union Nationale in Bagot. He would later become Daniel Johnson's organizer and would follow him throughout his career, including during his last election in 1966.) Though the Union Nationale was defeated by Adélard Godbout's Liberal Party, including in the riding of Bagot, which was won by the Liberal candidate Cyrille Dumaine, the experience was a watershed moment for Daniel Johnson. Thenceforth, he would concentrate his political ambitions in Bagot.

In July 1940, Johnson officially became a lawyer. Though his main practice was located in Montreal, he spent his weekends at a second office in Acton Vale as part of his efforts to establish a permanent presence in Bagot.

In 1942, he joined a new firm created by Jonathan Robinson. Robinson, one of the few anglophone Union Nationale members of the Legislative Assembly, had been fired by his previous anglophone firm for his party's anti-conscriptionist stance, though he himself was in favour. This new firm was helped off the ground by the wealthy American industrialist, Robert R. McCormick, who was the owner of The New York Times and The Chicago Tribune, founder of the town of Baie-Comeau on the north shore of the St. Lawrence River, and owner of logging operations on vast forest lands in the Baie-Comeau area, granted to him by the Quebec government. McCormick had become well-acquainted with Robinson through his role as intermediary between McCormick and Duplessis, leading to him appointing Robinson's new firm as his main legal counsel in Quebec. Daniel Johnson's time at the law firm thus allowed him to forge close ties with numerous influential figures, especially within the Union Nationale.

=== Representative for Bagot ===
In 1946, the incumbent Liberal Member of the Legislative Assembly (MLA) for Bagot, Cyrille Dumaine, suddenly died, triggering a by-election to fill the vacant seat. Daniel Johnson took the opportunity to propose his candidacy to Maurice Duplessis, who had been elected as premier two years earlier. Duplessis refused on the grounds that Johnson, at age 31, was "too young." However, Duplessis reconsidered his decision after receiving a letter from Johnson reiterating his loyalty. Johnson was thus allowed to participate in the nomination meeting, allowing him to showcase his considerable political acumen and ultimately, to be chosen as the candidate for the Union Nationale.

At the time, Bagot had been a safe seat for the Liberal Party of Quebec; apart from a by-election in 1938, which the Union Nationale had won, the riding of Bagot had elected a Liberal in every single provincial election since 1900. Thus, the campaign in Bagot became an opportunity for the Union Nationale to prove that it could rally the population around its fight against the centralization of powers in Ottawa. On December 18, 1946, Daniel Johnson was elected as the MLA for Bagot.

Once elected, Daniel Johnson became the voice of the young within the Union Nationale. The "MLA with a bright future" regularly appeared alongside his leader in political assemblies and was a staunch defender of the party's positions. In 1953, in the aftermath of an exceptional event in his personal life, where his wife was non-fatally shot twice by her extramarital lover, Johnson nearly quit politics altogether, going so far as to hand in his resignation to Maurice Duplessis. However, Duplessis refused to accept the resignation and instead decided to take the budding representative under his wing, appointing Johnson as his parliamentary secretary and using his considerable influence to stifle news about the incident, including the publication of his wife's name, so as to preserve Johnson's reputation. Two years later, on December 15, 1955, Johnson became the new deputy speaker of the Legislative Assembly. This strategic position allowed him to deepen his understanding of the internal workings of the government machine; being responsible for the smooth running of parliamentary debates, he was given permission to peruse the contents of each ministry's budgets in detail. After three years in the position, Johnson had become a master in parliamentary procedure, much like Duplessis himself.

=== Cabinet minister ===
On April 30, 1958, Daniel Johnson was appointed to Maurice Duplessis's cabinet as Minister of Hydraulic Resources, while his rival, Jean-Jacques Bertrand, was appointed as Minister of Land and Forests. In the first year of his tenure as minister, Johnson started the Manic-5 hydroelectric project, which was completed in 1968 and posthumously named after him.

A few months later, Daniel Johnson found himself embroiled in the natural gas scandal, which came to light via investigative journalism at Le Devoir. They had discovered that high-ranking members of the Duplessis government, including Johnson himself, had engaged in insider trading, using their confidential knowledge of the upcoming sale of the public natural gas network to a private corporation to manipulate their own personal investments. After purchasing 150 shares at $140 per share, Daniel Johnson reportedly made a profit of $5,250 in just under seven weeks; this revelation significantly damaged his reputation.

On September 7, 1959, Maurice Duplessis died, generating major political waves throughout the province. Paul Sauvé was chosen as the new leader of the Union Nationale and was immediately sworn in as premier, riding high on a message for change and promising 100 days of reforms, using the slogan Désormais (English: From now on). However, on January 2, 1960, after a mere three month in office, Sauvé also died. Antonio Barrette, Minister of Labour since 1944, was chosen as his replacement. Daniel Johnson remained Minister of Hydraulic Resources throughout this turmoil, up until the Union Nationale's defeat in the 1960 provincial election.

=== Opposition and setbacks ===
In June 1960, the incumbent Union Nationale government, led by Antonio Barrette, was defeated by Jean Lesage's Liberal Party. Once the dust had settled, a few days before the start of the parliamentary session in September 1960, Antonio Barrette announced that he was stepping down as leader of the Union Nationale. He also announced that a leadership convention would be held in the fall of 1961.

Despite the double hit of the party's overall poor performance and the natural gas scandal, Daniel Johnson was re-elected as the MLA for Bagot. With Barrette having resigned, he began to eye the leadership of the Union Nationale for himself. However, he soon became embroiled in yet another controversy, when, in November 1960, he accused the Liberals of creating counterfeit banknotes during the last election campaign, with the aim of buying votes and manipulating the outcome of the election. This scandal, dubbed the affaire des faux billets (English: counterfeit banknotes affair), ultimately backfired on Johnson and the Union Nationale and further tarnished his reputation. It also inspired caricaturist Normand Hudon to create a new character, referencing Johnson's Irish heritage, named Danny Boy, "a cowboy with the appearance of a gruff bandit, armed with a lasso and revolvers, firing in all directions." This caricature would go on to haunt Daniel Johnson for years to come, and the hit to him and his party's reputation would have the immediate effect of the loss of two seats, Joliette and Rouville, to the Liberal Party in by-elections.

At around this same time, Lesage's administration started a public inquiry, known as the Salvas commission, investigating the corruption and cronyism of the Duplessis government. Johnson considered the inquiry to be a blatant partisan attempt at dirtying the image of the Union Nationale, arguing that the Liberals were no different and were engaging in the same practices.

=== Leader of the Union Nationale ===
In the leadership race for the Union Nationale, Daniel Johnson faced off against his increasingly influential rival, Jean-Jacques Bertrand. Bertrand embodied the more progressive, reformist wing of the party, with his reputation as a man of integrity and his nationalist rhetoric rallying a majority of young people. One of Bertrand's goals was to free the party from the chokehold of a clique of overly powerful senior party members, such as long-time treasurer Gérald Martineau and campaign organizer Joseph-Damase Bégin, who were resistant to the changes demanded by Quebec society.

Daniel Johnson, on the other hand, represented the more traditional, conservative wing of the party, advocating for the maintenance of the confessional school system and the limiting of state power, especially in the realm of private enterprise. Johnson garnered support from the very clique that Bertrand was hell-bent on dismantling, including Martineau and Bégin themselves. However, wanting to avoid alienating Bertrand's faction and splitting the party, Johnson concentrated his attacks on the Liberal Party, employing a combative tone and style rivalling that of Duplessis.

Johnson was initially the favourite to win the leadership. However, as the convention approached, his lead on Bertrand narrowed. After a fierce contest, Daniel Johnson was elected as leader of the Union Nationale with 1,006 votes to Bertrand's 912.

=== 1962 provincial elections ===
Despite Johnson's victory as party leader, tensions between the two factions persisted and were only further laid bare by the triggering of an early election in 1962 by Premier Lesage, whose party rallied around the ballot-box question of the nationalization of hydroelectricity. Meanwhile, the Union Nationale was split on the issue, with Daniel Johnson opposing nationalization on the grounds of it costing too much, while Jean-Jacques Bertrand and his supporters advocated for the project. This internal split within the Union Nationale led Johnson to agree to hold a referendum on nationalization, a compromise which ultimately failed to soften the party's overwhelmingly negative image.

On November 11, the first televised debate in Canadian history took place between Daniel Johnson and Jean Lesage, organized by Radio-Canada. Owing to a lack of preparation and a failure to adapt his style to this new medium, the debate left voters with a poor impression of Johnson, crushing hopes of a last-minute electoral boost in the remaining three days of the campaign. The Liberal Party was thus re-elected with 62 seats (56.4% of the vote), compared to the Union Nationale's 31 seats (42.15% of the vote).

After the Union Nationale's electoral loss, Daniel Johnson went through the worst period of his career. While trying to find his path forward, he took a trip to Europe in 1964, stopping in Sweden and Finland to study the workings of their welfare states and labour unions, especially the role of unelected civil servants, which he had previously seen as a threat to democracy. He closed off the trip by visiting Paris, where he suffered a heart attack, forcing him to re-evaluate his priorities. As a result, in December 1964, he resolved to reconcile with his detractors within the party, namely Jean-Jacques Bertrand. Seeking to turn a new page and consolidate his leadership, he also set a date for a party congress in March 1965.

=== Union Nationale Congress ===
The Union Nationale congress, held from March 18 to March 20, 1965, was open to both party members and the public. Additionally in attendance were a range of experts from various backgrounds, invited to discuss current issues with the party leadership. To inaugurate the conference, Daniel Johnson published his book, Égalité ou indépendance (English: Equality or Independance), in which he expressed his support for self-determination in Quebec's relations with the federal government. In the book, referencing former Canadian prime minister William Lyon Mackenzie King's declaration during the conscription crisis, Johnnson summed up his position as "independence if necessary, but not necessarily independence." Johnson also demanded full recognition of the dual nature of Canada as two nations and two cultures, therefore rejecting the Fulton-Favreau formula supported by Lesage's Liberals. However, in 1965, the threat of separation was by and large a negotiation strategy to strengthen the province's position in the federation, with independence still being seen as a radical and improbable option.

By the end of the conference, the Union Nationale had developed a new platform that marked a clear break from the Duplessis era in its comparative affinity for state interventionism. Notably, they proposed repatriating all taxes to Quebec, creating new ministries for immigration, recreation, and economic planning, establishing a comprehensive universal healthcare plan, introducing free education at all levels, adopting an anti-scab law, creating a provincial industrial fund, and adopting a declaration of human rights. The Union Nationale thus emerged from the congress with both a new platform and a long-awaited original solution to the national question, which took into account the modern sensibilities of Quebec as well as its burgeoning nationalism. According to historian Pierre B. Berthelot, this constituted "the moment when the Union Nationale was won over by the Quiet Revolution and turned its back on the party's founder."

=== 1966 provincial elections ===
In April 1966, a general election was called, set to take place in June of that year. Despite a significant improvement in the public image of the Union Nationale and Daniel Johnson, polls still gave a considerable lead to Jean Lesage's Liberal Party.

The Liberal Party centered their campaign around the singular figure of their leader, Jean Lesage, thus abandoning the équipe du tonnerre (lit. 'thunder team') brand that had previously buoyed them to power. The Union Nationale, meanwhile, opted for the exact opposite strategy, running a ground-level campaign that catered to specific local interests and highlighted local candidates who were usually well-known and respected within their community. This strategy worked particularly well in rural areas, where dissatisfaction with Lesage's school reforms, among other issues, was most intense.

The election was held on June 5, 1966. The initial results reported on election night gave the Liberal Party a significant lead, but gradually, aided by a favourable electoral map, the Union Nationale began to catch up. It was well into the night when the Union Nationale finally reached the 55 seats needed for a majority, despite receiving only 41% of the vote share compared to 47% for the Liberals. In the final tally, the Union Nationale won 56 seats to the Liberals' 50.

The Union Nationale's victory came as a surprise to Quebecers—and Canadians—of all stripes. In the provincial civil service, employees feared that Johnson's victory meant the end of Lesage's reforms and a return to the worst of the Duplessis era. However, the day after the election, Johnson announced that he intended to continue reforms in the same vein as his predecessors.

This was to be the last election won by the Union Nationale, and the last election won by a party other than the Liberal Party or the Parti Québécois until the 2018 election.

=== Premier of Quebec ===
Several major social reforms marked the beginning of Johnson's tenure. In education, he made good on the recommendations of the Parent Commission by creating the CEGEP system, which offered post-secondary education, including vocational training, below the university level. He also undergirded the creation of a new French-language university in Montreal, the Université du Québec à Montréal, which officially opened in 1969. A network of universities would later be developed across the province under the Université du Québec umbrella. This constituted one of the more notable achievements of the Quiet Revolution, as opportunities for university-level education in French had historically been very limited.

Reforms also continued in the health sector with the complete implementation of the Régie de l'assurance maladie du Québec, which granted Quebec residents basic health coverage. Johnson's administration also created the first public TV channel specific to the province, Radio-Québec (now known as Télé-Québec), thereby reviving an old bill from the Duplessis era dating back to 1945.

Johnson continued the work of the previous administration in expanding the role of the state in the economy, for example by enlarging Sidbec, a crown corporation responsible for the development of the metallurgy industry, and creating the Société québécoise d'initiatives pétrolières, tasked with fossil fuel prospecting in the province. He also created the Office de planification du Québec (English: Quebec Planning Bureau). On the constitutional front, Johnson frequently butted heads with the federal government, especially with the recently elected, ardently federalist prime minister Pierre Trudeau. Trudeau's multiculturalist views contrasted sharply with Johnson's, who, during his time as premier, put forward proposals to reform the Canadian Constitution based on the notion of two equal nations, as opposed to ten equal provinces, and who attempted to repatriate the entirety of Quebec's taxes.

In international relations, Daniel Johnson developed a special relationship with French President Charles de Gaulle, with the latter calling Johnson his "friend." This came at a time when Franco-Canadian relations were already strained, leading to further tension between Quebec and Ottawa. The fruit of the blossoming relationship between the two French-speaking nations was a visit, at Johnson's invitation, from de Gaulle to the province in July 1967 as part of Expo 67. This visit turned into a historic event when de Gaulle delivered a speech from Montreal City Hall that would go down in history, in which he exclaimed, "Vive le Québec libre!" (English: Long live free Quebec!).

In February 1968, de Gaulle's special relationship with Johnson also led to Quebec's participation—at de Gaulle's invitation—in an international Francophone conference on education in Libreville, Gabon. The Quebec delegation, led by Minister of Education Jean-Guy Cardinal, was treated by the host country as if they were representatives of a sovereign state, no different from all the other participants of the conference, with the Quebec flag being flown instead of the Canadian flag. This episode provoked a backlash in Ottawa, who argued that international relations were the sole purview of the federal government, and that provinces did not have a right to attend international conferences even when it related to areas in their jurisdiction, such as education. In the lead up to the second part of the conference, which would take place in April in Paris, Pierre Trudeau, who was still Minister of Justice at the time, went as far as publicly threatening breaking off diplomatic relations with France if Quebec were to be invited a second time. With Quebec's participation confirmed by both Quebec City and Paris, Trudeau recalled Canada's ambassador to France, Jules Léger. Disregarding Trudeau's threat as a bluff, Johnson nonetheless sent Jean-Guy Cardinal to Paris for the second part of the conference. In the end, Johnson's bet paid off, with Ambassador Léger soon being returned to Paris with nothing but a letter of protest in retaliation.

== Death ==
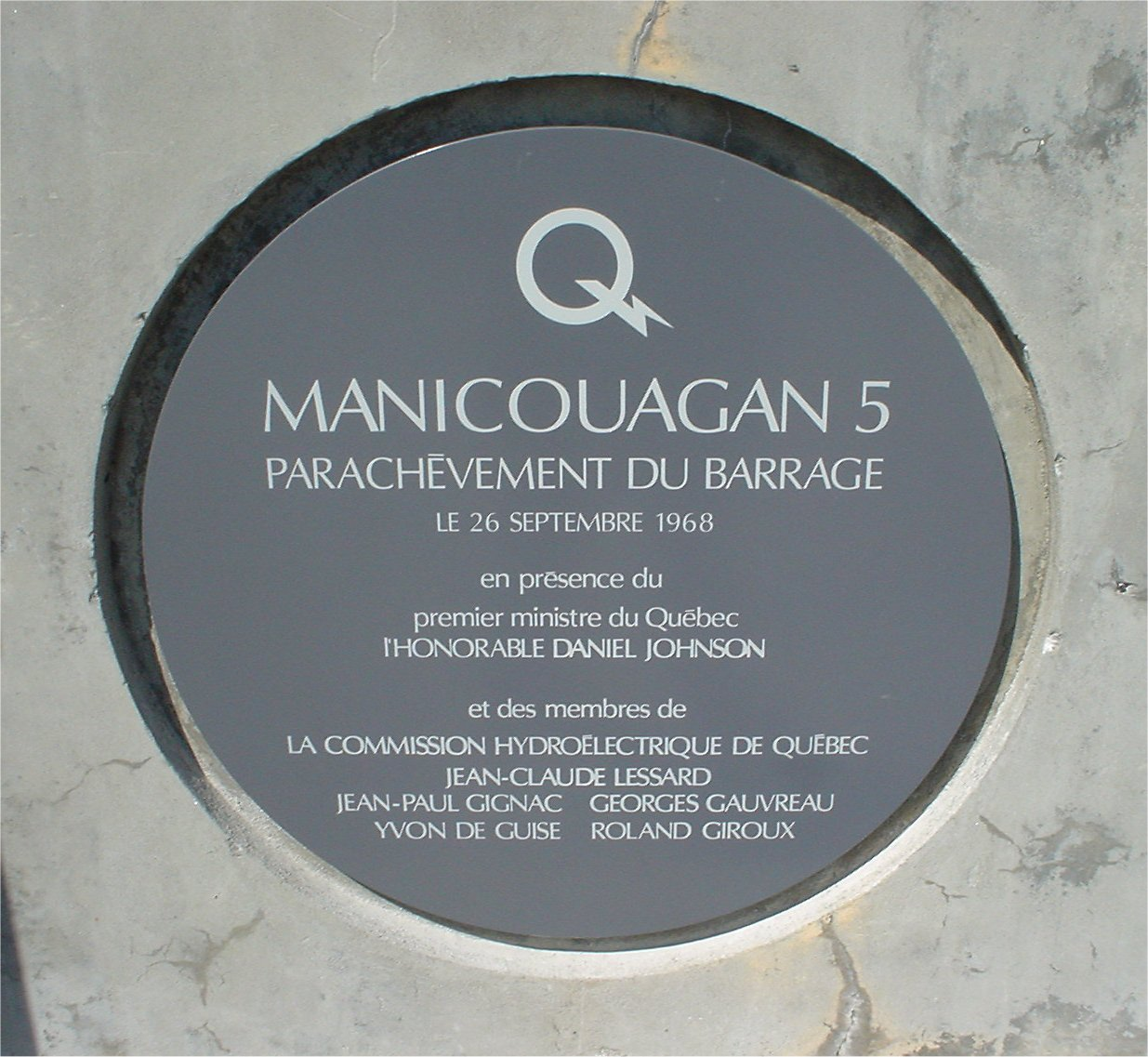
Original dedication plaque — Manicouagan 5, 1968.

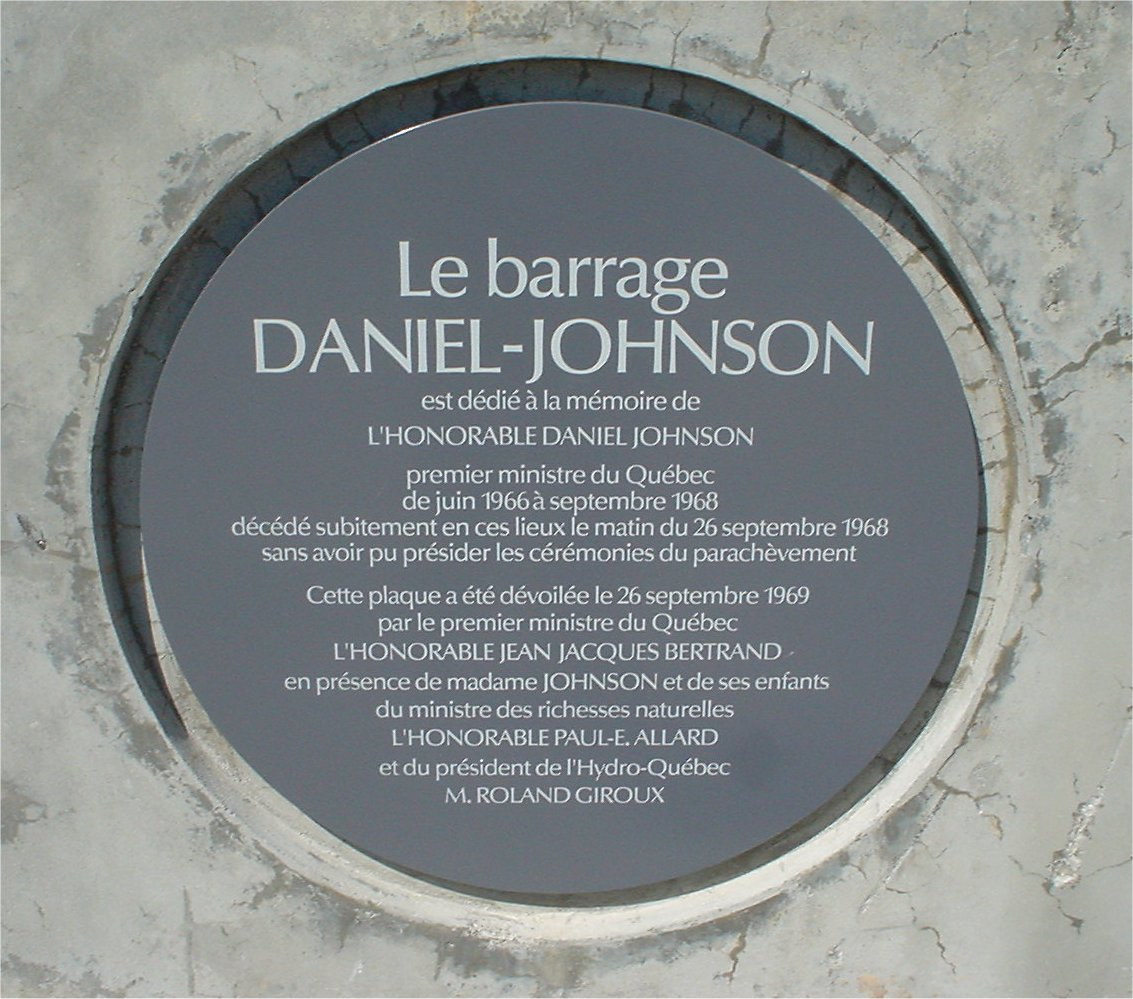
Dedication plaque of the Daniel Johnson Dam, unveiled by Johnson's successor, Jean-Jacques Bertrand on September 26, 1969.

At the end of 1967, Daniel Johnson spent a month recovering from a heart attack at a resort in Honolulu, whose location was kept secret from the press. His poor medical condition limited him in his capacities as premier, with Finance Minister Paul Dozois taking over many of his duties. In July 1968, Johnson suffered another heart attack that kept him from work until mid-September.

On September 25, Hydro-Québec organized a ceremony to mark the completion of the Manicouagan-5 Dam, which Johnson himself had launched as Minister of Hydraulic Resources in 1958. Hundreds of dignitaries, politicians, and journalists were flown out by plane from Montreal, Quebec City, and New York City to the worksite to attend a banquet and a plaque-unveiling ceremony.

Among the guests were Jean Lesage and René Lévesque, the former Minister of Hydraulic Resources under Lesage, who had been responsible for completing the nationalization of Hydro-Québec. Photographs taken at the banquet show the two men and the premier in jovial spirits, shaking hands and smiling, despite the difficult relations between Lesage and Lévesque, who had just recently defected to the Mouvement Souveraineté-Association, a precursor to the Parti Québécois. Johnson joked to the pair, "I have finally reunited you guys!" (French: "Je vous ai enfin réunis!").

The next morning, Johnson had his final heart attack. In his memoirs, Hydro-Québec executive Robert A. Boyd recalls being woken up at 6 a.m. by his boss, Roland Giroux. "I've got bad news, Robert...," said Giroux, who added that he had just found the premier lying dead in his bed.

Johnson's death sent shockwaves through the delegation gathered at Manic-5 and across the province, and the inauguration ceremony was quickly cancelled. On September 26, 1969, a year to the day after Johnson's death, the new premier, Jean-Jacques Bertrand, accompanied by Johnson's widow and children, unveiled two plaques and officially dedicated the dam to his predecessor. Both plaques are now side by side at the top of the complex.

== See also ==
- Politics of Quebec
- List of Quebec premiers
- List of Quebec general elections
- Nicknames of politicians and personalities in Quebec

== Notes ==
Political offices
Preceded by Antonio Talbot	Leader of the Opposition in Quebec; 1961–1966	Succeeded by Jean Lesage
Party political offices
Preceded by Antonio Talbot (interim)	Leader of the Union Nationale; 1961–1968	Succeeded by Jean-Jacques Bertrand
