= 1962 Quebec general election =

Canadian provincial election

- November 14, 1962

95 seats in the 27th Legislative Assembly of Quebec 48 seats were needed for a majority
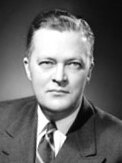

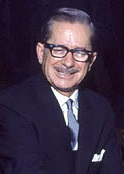
	First party	Second party
Leader	Jean Lesage	Daniel Johnson Sr.
Party	Liberal	Union Nationale
Leader since	May 31, 1958	September 23, 1961
Leader's seat	Québec-Ouest	Bagot
Last election	51 seats, 51.38%	43 seats, 46.61%
Seats won	63	31
Seat change	▲12	▼12
Popular vote	1,205,253	900,817
Percentage	56.40%	42.15%
Swing	▲5.02%	▼4.46%
Premier before election
Jean Lesage
Liberal
Premier after election
Jean Lesage
Liberal

The 1962 Quebec general election was held on November 14, 1962, to elect members of the Legislative Assembly of the Province of Quebec, Canada. The incumbent Quebec Liberal Party, led by Jean Lesage, was re-elected, defeating the Union Nationale (UN) led by Daniel Johnson, Sr.

In an unusual move, the election was called just two years after the previous 1960 general election. Lesage sought a mandate for the nationalization of the electrical power industry, using the slogan Maîtres chez nous, 'Masters in our own home', and declaring it to be the single issue on which he was ready to stake his political career.

A few days before the election, the Union Nationale's chief organizer, André Lagarde, was arrested for fraud. The Liberals claimed this was proof of lingering corruption dating from the Maurice Duplessis era, but the UN cried foul. While the courts eventually acquitted Lagarde after the election, the incident may well have contributed to the UN's defeat.

The Liberal Party won an increased number of seats and a higher percentage of the popular vote compared to the previous election. Their majority government allowed them to pursue their campaign promise of electricity nationalization, spearheaded by future Parti Québécois founder René Lévesque, who at the time served as a cabinet minister in the Lesage government.

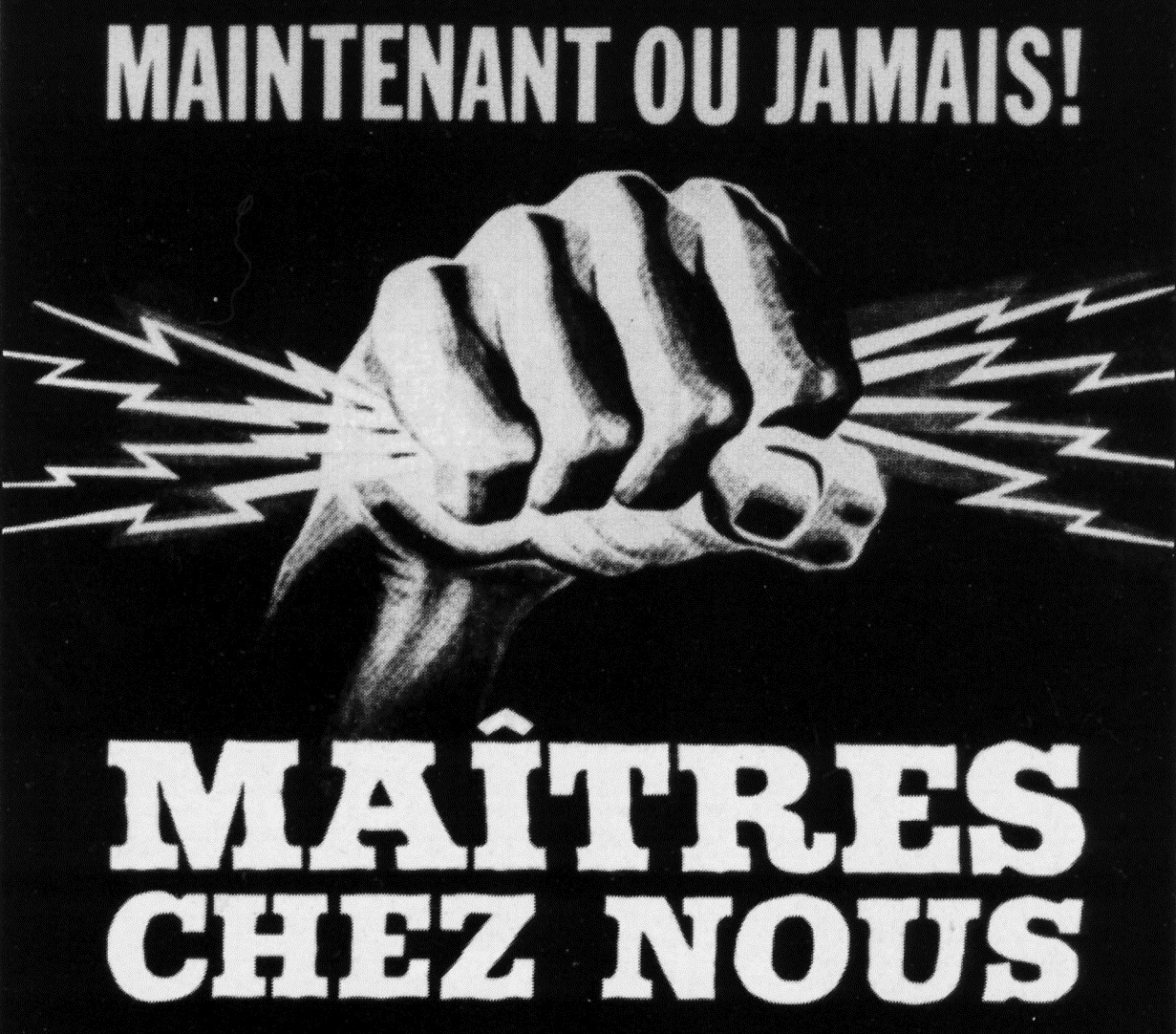
"Maîtres chez nous" (Masters in Our Own Home) was the electoral slogan of the Liberal Party during the 1962 election.

Action provinciale, a new group founded by Hertel Larocque (a former secretary of Camillien Houde), fielded 11 candidates in the election but failed to gather a significant number of votes. Johnson opted not to have the UN join forces with it, keeping in mind the failure the Liberals had had in attempting the same manoeuvre with the Créditistes in 1956. However, Social Credit was still a force to reckon with even while not campaigning on the provincial scene, and Johnson did not hesitate to use its vocabulary in his speeches while on the campaign trail.

Riding contests, by number of candidates (1960)
Candidates	Lib	UN	Ind	I-Lib	I-UN	AP	Con	Comm	Total
2	67	67							134
3	24	24	6	7	1	8	1	1	72
4	2	2		2		2			8
5	2	2	3	1	1	1			10
Total	95	95	9	10	2	11	1	1	224

== Results ==
Elections to the Legislative Assembly of Quebec (1962)
Political party	Party leader	MPPs				Votes			
Political party	Party leader	Candidates	1960	1962	±	#	±	%	± (pp)
Liberal	Jean Lesage	95	52	63	11▲	1,205,253	128,118▲	56.40%	5.02▲
Union Nationale	Daniel Johnson, Sr.	95	42	31	11▼	900,817	76,490▼	42.15%	4.46▼
Independent		9	1	1	Steady	13,581	8,606▼	0.64%	0.42▼
Other candidates									
█ Independent-Liberal		10				11,209	3,001▲	0.52%	0.13▲
█ Conservative		1				4,255	4,255▲	0.20%	New
█ Action provinciale		11				1,445	1,445▲	0.07%	New
█ Independent-Unionist		2				336	10,195▼	0.02%	0.48▼
█ Communist		1				71	465▼	0.00%	0.03▼
Total		224	95	95		2,136,967		100%	
Rejected ballots						29,509	4,012▼		
Voter turnout						2,166,476	36,369▲	79.59	2.07▼
Registered electors						2,721,933	113,494▲		

=== Vote and seat summaries ===
Ternary plots - shift of electoral support (1960-1962)
1960

1962
Electoral districts identified by colours of winning parties

Seats and popular vote by party
Party	Seats	Votes	Change (pp)
█ Liberal	63 / 95	56.40%	5.02
█ Union Nationale	31 / 95	42.15%	-4.46
█ Independent	1 / 95	0.64%	-0.42
█ Other	0 / 95	0.81%	-0.14

=== Synopsis of results ===
Results by riding - 1962 Quebec general election
Riding	Winning party						Turnout (Note: including spoilt ballots)	Votes						
Name	1960	Party	Votes	Share	Margin #	Margin %	Turnout	Lib	UN	Ind	I-Lib	AP	Other	Total
Abitibi-Est	Lib	Lib	14,892	51.93%	1,109	3.87%	85.24%	14,892	13,783	–	–	–	–	28,675
Abitibi-Ouest	Lib	Lib	6,732	56.97%	1,648	13.95%	88.52%	6,732	5,084	–	–	–	–	11,816
Argenteuil	UN	UN	7,922	54.57%	2,610	17.98%	86.22%	5,312	7,922	–	1,284	–	–	14,518
Arthabaska	Lib	Lib	10,988	53.54%	1,453	7.08%	91.70%	10,988	9,535	–	–	–	–	20,523
Bagot	UN	UN	5,336	55.11%	989	10.21%	92.36%	4,347	5,336	–	–	–	–	9,683
Beauce	Lib	UN	12,583	51.96%	947	3.91%	87.25%	11,636	12,583	–	–	–	–	24,219
Beauharnois	UN	Lib	11,884	51.72%	791	3.44%	90.19%	11,884	11,093	–	–	–	–	22,977
Bellechasse	Lib	UN	5,176	51.35%	273	2.71%	80.81%	4,903	5,176	–	–	–	–	10,079
Berthier	UN	Lib	5,938	50.05%	110	0.93%	85.57%	5,938	5,828	–	–	98	–	11,864
Bonaventure	Lib	Lib	9,525	57.28%	2,421	14.56%	85.26%	9,525	7,104	–	–	–	–	16,629
Bourget	Lib	Lib	42,906	58.74%	17,728	24.27%	73.21%	42,906	25,178	4,807	–	153	–	73,044
Brome	Lib	Lib	3,417	55.82%	713	11.65%	81.43%	3,417	2,704	–	–	–	–	6,121
Chambly	Lib	Lib	36,290	63.83%	17,094	30.07%	76.89%	36,290	19,196	778	353	–	235	56,852
Champlain	UN	UN	12,346	52.74%	1,282	5.48%	90.97%	11,064	12,346	–	–	–	–	23,410
Charlevoix	UN	Lib	6,942	52.23%	594	4.47%	87.21%	6,942	6,348	–	–	–	–	13,290
Châteauguay	UN	Lib	8,727	54.83%	1,538	9.66%	84.04%	8,727	7,189	–	–	–	–	15,916
Chicoutimi	UN	UN	16,910	50.29%	192	0.57%	88.05%	16,718	16,910	–	–	–	–	33,628
Compton	UN	UN	5,568	54.45%	1,014	9.92%	87.30%	4,554	5,568	–	–	104	–	10,226
Deux-Montagnes	Lib	Lib	8,518	57.31%	2,174	14.63%	86.94%	8,518	6,344	–	–	–	–	14,862
Dorchester	UN	UN	7,818	53.64%	1,060	7.27%	83.78%	6,758	7,818	–	–	–	–	14,576
Drummond	Lib	Lib	14,621	57.17%	3,668	14.34%	90.97%	14,621	10,953	–	–	–	–	25,574
Duplessis	Lib	Lib	7,345	59.84%	2,416	19.68%	79.19%	7,345	4,929	–	–	–	–	12,274
Frontenac	UN	UN	6,217	52.46%	582	4.91%	87.92%	5,635	6,217	–	–	–	–	11,852
Gaspé-Nord	Lib	UN	5,183	51.75%	444	4.43%	88.07%	4,739	5,183	93	–	–	–	10,015
Gaspé-Sud	UN	Lib	7,197	50.40%	113	0.79%	89.09%	7,197	7,084	–	–	–	–	14,281
Gatineau	UN	Lib	10,289	54.57%	1,725	9.15%	77.83%	10,289	8,564	–	–	–	–	18,853
Hull	Lib	Lib	14,854	63.36%	6,266	26.73%	78.05%	14,854	8,588	–	–	–	–	23,442
Huntingdon	UN	UN	3,449	54.14%	528	8.29%	85.15%	2,921	3,449	–	–	–	–	6,370
Iberville	Lib	Lib	4,452	55.87%	936	11.75%	91.07%	4,452	3,516	–	–	–	–	7,968
Îles-de-la-Madeleine	UN	Lib	2,674	51.86%	192	3.72%	92.10%	2,674	2,482	–	–	–	–	5,156
Jacques-Cartier	Lib	Lib	69,199	77.74%	49,388	55.49%	72.46%	69,199	19,811	–	–	–	–	89,010
Joliette	UN	UN	10,236	52.96%	5,037	26.06%	85.90%	5,199	10,236	–	3,891	–	–	19,326
Jonquière-Kénogami	Lib	Lib	16,100	60.38%	5,536	20.76%	86.48%	16,100	10,564	–	–	–	–	26,664
Kamouraska	UN	Lib	5,453	50.19%	41	0.38%	82.02%	5,453	5,412	–	–	–	–	10,865
L'Assomption	Lib	Lib	9,680	55.06%	1,984	11.29%	84.49%	9,680	7,696	–	70	134	–	17,580
L'Islet	Lib	UN	5,239	53.25%	639	6.49%	83.90%	4,600	5,239	–	–	–	–	9,839
Labelle	UN	UN	6,005	57.11%	1,695	16.12%	84.51%	4,310	6,005	199	–	–	–	10,514
Lac-Saint-Jean	Lib	Lib	9,171	52.63%	915	5.25%	89.25%	9,171	8,256	–	–	–	–	17,427
Laval	Lib	Lib	67,316	66.31%	33,807	33.30%	76.57%	67,316	33,509	–	461	237	–	101,523
Laviolette	UN	UN	11,315	53.63%	1,533	7.27%	85.24%	9,782	11,315	–	–	–	–	21,097
Lévis	Lib	Lib	13,434	54.43%	2,346	9.51%	88.47%	13,434	11,088	158	–	–	–	24,680
Lotbinière	UN	UN	6,393	53.56%	849	7.11%	88.62%	5,544	6,393	–	–	–	–	11,937
Maisonneuve	UN	Lib	28,814	58.89%	8,702	17.79%	71.75%	28,814	20,112	–	–	–	–	48,926
Maskinongé	UN	UN	5,312	53.71%	734	7.42%	91.18%	4,578	5,312	–	–	–	–	9,890
Matane	Lib	Lib	8,204	50.40%	130	0.80%	83.20%	8,204	8,074	–	–	–	–	16,278
Matapédia	Lib	Lib	6,111	51.05%	252	2.11%	84.29%	6,111	5,859	–	–	–	–	11,970
Mégantic	Lib	Lib	13,182	55.05%	2,420	10.11%	88.95%	13,182	10,762	–	–	–	–	23,944
Missisquoi	UN	UN	7,630	57.38%	1,962	14.75%	84.84%	5,668	7,630	–	–	–	–	13,298
Montcalm	UN	Lib	4,662	55.41%	911	10.83%	88.54%	4,662	3,751	–	–	–	–	8,413
Montmagny	Lib	UN	5,747	50.49%	111	0.98%	86.57%	5,636	5,747	–	–	–	–	11,383
Montmorency	UN	UN	5,717	50.67%	398	3.53%	88.32%	5,319	5,717	–	–	247	–	11,283
Montréal–Jeanne-Mance	UN	Lib	40,899	59.64%	13,740	20.04%	68.18%	40,899	27,159	519	–	–	–	68,577
Montréal-Laurier	Lib	Lib	15,837	58.16%	4,563	16.76%	76.41%	15,837	11,274	–	–	117	–	27,228
Montréal-Mercier	UN	Lib	16,992	54.07%	3,322	10.57%	75.56%	16,992	13,670	–	764	–	–	31,426
Montréal–Notre-Dame-de-Grâce	Lib	Lib	37,100	78.55%	29,357	62.15%	59.89%	37,100	7,743	–	2,389	–	–	47,232
Montréal-Outremont	Lib	Lib	36,076	77.63%	26,647	57.34%	60.34%	36,076	9,429	969	–	–	–	46,474
Montréal–Saint-Henri	Lib	Lib	17,548	53.04%	2,540	7.68%	70.28%	17,548	15,008	–	531	–	–	33,087
Montréal–Saint-Jacques	UN	UN	7,854	52.10%	705	4.68%	65.65%	7,149	7,854	–	–	–	71	15,074
Montréal–Saint-Louis	Lib	Lib	14,082	58.15%	3,949	16.31%	60.95%	14,082	10,133	–	–	–	–	24,215
Montréal–Sainte-Anne	Ind	Ind	6,058	45.84%	746	5.65%	57.89%	5,312	1,845	6,058	–	–	–	13,215
Montréal–Sainte-Marie	UN	UN	12,977	52.47%	1,321	5.34%	67.43%	11,656	12,977	–	–	–	101	24,734
Montréal-Verdun	Lib	Lib	21,208	65.98%	10,274	31.96%	72.80%	21,208	10,934	–	–	–	–	32,142
Napierville-Laprairie	UN	Lib	9,865	56.53%	2,278	13.05%	86.33%	9,865	7,587	–	–	–	–	17,452
Nicolet	UN	Lib	7,209	51.74%	484	3.47%	85.96%	7,209	6,725	–	–	–	–	13,934
Papineau	UN	UN	12,304	55.28%	2,351	10.56%	85.66%	9,953	12,304	–	–	–	–	22,257
Pontiac	UN	UN	5,108	59.81%	1,675	19.61%	75.86%	3,433	5,108	–	–	–	–	8,541
Portneuf	Lib	Lib	11,059	51.34%	702	3.26%	85.36%	11,059	10,357	–	–	124	–	21,540
Québec-Centre	UN	Lib	9,750	55.13%	1,813	10.25%	84.08%	9,750	7,937	–	–	–	–	17,687
Québec-Comté	Lib	Lib	34,090	57.80%	9,196	15.59%	87.07%	34,090	24,894	–	–	–	–	58,984
Québec-Est	UN	Lib	21,001	52.20%	1,767	4.39%	88.59%	21,001	19,234	–	–	–	–	40,235
Québec-Ouest	Lib	Lib	14,582	67.91%	7,692	35.82%	88.24%	14,582	6,890	–	–	–	–	21,472
Richelieu	Lib	Lib	10,598	55.61%	2,137	11.21%	90.11%	10,598	8,461	–	–	–	–	19,059
Richmond	Lib	Lib	9,932	57.88%	2,703	15.75%	85.16%	9,932	7,229	–	–	–	–	17,161
Rimouski	Lib	Lib	10,720	52.22%	911	4.44%	82.70%	10,720	9,809	–	–	–	–	20,529
Rivière-du-Loup	Lib	Lib	8,493	51.22%	403	2.43%	85.70%	8,493	8,090	–	–	–	–	16,583
Roberval	Lib	UN	11,172	51.23%	537	2.46%	85.07%	10,635	11,172	–	–	–	–	21,807
Rouville	UN	Lib	6,575	56.08%	1,426	12.16%	86.80%	6,575	5,149	–	–	–	–	11,724
Rouyn-Noranda	Lib	Lib	9,386	60.06%	3,144	20.12%	85.50%	9,386	6,242	–	–	–	–	15,628
Saguenay	Lib	Lib	12,116	57.35%	3,106	14.70%	78.97%	12,116	9,010	–	–	–	–	21,126
Saint-Hyacinthe	Lib	Lib	12,070	56.30%	2,701	12.60%	84.85%	12,070	9,369	–	–	–	–	21,439
Saint-Jean	Lib	Lib	8,869	50.55%	866	4.94%	89.57%	8,869	8,003	–	672	–	–	17,544
Saint-Maurice	Lib	Lib	15,684	55.73%	3,224	11.46%	88.19%	15,684	12,460	–	–	–	–	28,144
Saint-Sauveur	UN	UN	12,641	51.43%	702	2.86%	89.13%	11,939	12,641	–	–	–	–	24,580
Shefford	UN	UN	12,026	50.01%	800	3.33%	85.22%	11,226	12,026	–	794	–	–	24,046
Sherbrooke	Lib	Lib	18,539	52.46%	1,825	5.16%	81.29%	18,539	16,714	–	–	86	–	35,339
Stanstead	Lib	Lib	8,918	56.32%	2,101	13.27%	84.29%	8,918	6,817	–	–	99	–	15,834
Témiscamingue	UN	Lib	4,102	52.98%	462	5.97%	87.18%	4,102	3,640	–	–	–	–	7,742
Témiscouata	UN	UN	5,931	60.69%	2,089	21.38%	82.38%	3,842	5,931	–	–	–	–	9,773
Terrebonne	Lib	Lib	26,901	58.98%	8,188	17.95%	85.00%	26,901	18,713	–	–	–	–	45,614
Trois-Rivières	UN	UN	15,323	51.75%	1,036	3.50%	89.96%	14,287	15,323	–	–	–	–	29,610
Vaudreuil-Soulanges	Lib	Lib	10,780	57.49%	2,809	14.98%	90.45%	10,780	7,971	–	–	–	–	18,751
Verchères	Lib	Lib	6,827	58.51%	1,985	17.01%	87.62%	6,827	4,842	–	–	–	–	11,669
Westmount–Saint-Georges	Lib	Lib	13,114	69.03%	11,486	60.46%	59.04%	13,114	1,628	–	–	–	4,255	18,997
Wolfe	Lib	UN	3,939	52.92%	481	6.46%	90.26%	3,458	3,939	–	–	46	–	7,443
Yamaska	UN	UN	4,078	60.16%	1,377	20.31%	84.60%	2,701	4,078	–	–	–	–	6,779

= open seat
= turnout is above provincial average
= winning candidate was in previous Legislature
= incumbent had switched allegiance
= not incumbent; was previously elected to the Legislature
= incumbency arose from byelection gain
= other incumbents renominated
= multiple candidates

=== Analysis ===
Party candidates in 2nd place
Party in 1st place	Party in 2nd place			Total
Party in 1st place	Lib	UN	Con	Total
Liberal		62	1	63
Union Nationale	31			31
Independent	1			1
Total	32	62	1	95

Candidates ranked 1st to 5th place, by party
Parties	1st	2nd	3rd	4th	5th
█ Liberal	63	62	2		
█ Union Nationale	31	52	1		
█ Independent	1		7	1	
█ Conservative		1			
█ Action provinciale			9	1	1
█ Independent Liberal			8	2	
█ Independent UN			1		1
█ Communist			1		

Resulting composition of the 28th Quebec Legislative Assembly
Source		Party			
Source		Lib	UN	Ind	Total
Seats retained	Incumbents returned	43	21	1	65
Seats retained	Open seats held	2	2		4
Seats retained	Byelection loss reversed		1		1
Seats changing hands	Incumbents defeated	17	5		22
Seats changing hands	Incumbents defeated - previous incumbents returned		1		1
Seats changing hands	Open seats gained		1		1
Seats changing hands	Byelection gain held	1			1
Total		63	31	1	95

== See also ==
- List of Quebec premiers
- Politics of Quebec
- Timeline of Quebec history
- List of Quebec political parties
- Quiet Revolution
- 27th Legislative Assembly of Quebec
