= 1960 Quebec general election =

Canadian provincial election

- June 22, 1960

95 seats in the 26th Legislative Assembly of Quebec 48 seats were needed for a majority
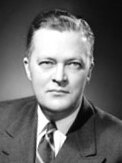

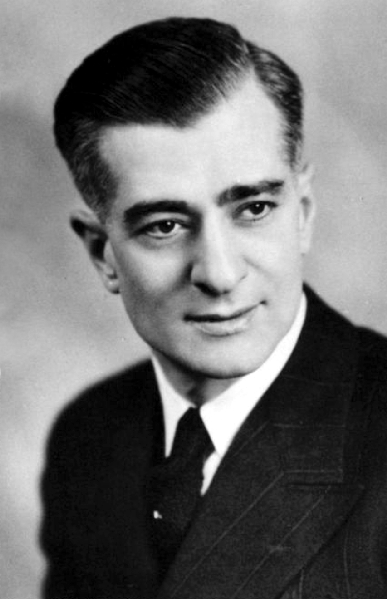
	First party	Second party
Leader	Jean Lesage	Antonio Barrette
Party	Liberal	Union Nationale
Leader since	May 31, 1958	January 7, 1960
Leader's seat	Québec-Ouest	Joliette
Last election	20 seats, 44.87%	72 seats, 51.80%
Seats won	51	43
Seat change	▲31	▼29
Percentage	51.38%	46.61%
Swing	▲6.51pp	▼5.19pp
Premier before election
Antonio Barrette
Union Nationale
Premier after election
Jean Lesage
Liberal

The 1960 Quebec general election was held on June 22, 1960, to elect members of the Legislative Assembly of Quebec, Canada. It was one of the most significant elections in Quebec history, rivalled perhaps only by the 1976 general election. The incumbent Union Nationale, led by Antonio Barrette, was defeated by the Quebec Liberal Party, led by Jean Lesage.

The 1960 election set the stage for the Quiet Revolution, a major social transformation of all aspects of Quebec society throughout the 1960s. Among many other changes, the influence and power of the Catholic Church fell sharply as Quebec became a secular society.

This election put an end to 16 years of continuous Union Nationale rule, much of it under Maurice Duplessis. Duplessis had died in 1959, ending a period that was later derisively referred to as La Grande Noirceur (the Great Darkness).

Duplessis' successor, longtime minister Paul Sauvé, saw the need to modernize a government that had long been one of the most conservative provincial governments in Canada. He initiated a "hundred days of change" that began to transform Quebec society, but they were cut short when Sauvé died suddenly after only a few months in office. He was succeeded by another longtime minister, Antonio Barrette. However, with its second new leader in less than a year and its third in less than two years, and no published platform, the Union Nationale was thus in disarray when it went into the election.

This was the last Quebec election where no female candidates were elected. In a 1961 by-election, Liberal Marie-Claire Kirkland would win a seat, representing Jacques-Cartier.

== Background ==
On September 7, 1959, Maurice Duplessis died during a visit to the northern mining town of Schefferville. His nearly 20 years as premier (interrupted from 1939 to 1944 by Adélard Godbout) were marked by conservatism, clientelism, deference to the Catholic hierarchy, defence of provincial powers from federal interference, opposition to Keynesianism, and fierce anti-syndicalism. Contrary to some accounts of the Grande Noirceur, however, Quebec in the late 1950s was on the path to modernization, with a largely urbanized population and a significant manufacturing sector.

Three days after the death of "le Chef" (the Boss), the cabinet chose Paul Sauvé as his successor. Sauvé undertook his "100 days" of change under the slogan "désormais " (From now on), determined to modernize the machinery of government after years of stagnation under Duplessis. On January 2, 1960, while he had wind in his sails and threatened the Liberals' momentum, the new premier died suddenly in Saint-Eustache, in his riding of Deux-Montagnes. On January 7, Antonio Barrette was chosen as premier. The party thus headed into the election with its third leader in under a year. Further undermining the government's stability was the exposure of the natural gas scandal, reported by Le Devoir on June 13, 1958.

Jean Lesage had been elected leader of the Liberal Party on May 31, 1958, succeeding Georges-Émile Lapalme. Lesage aimed to take advantage of the government's setbacks. Particularly critical of official corruption and Union Nationale policies on federal-provincial relations, he promised to create a "strong and dynamic state" against the "occupying regime". The party could also count on recently recruited star candidate René Lévesque to promote its program.

In addition to the two main parties, the Social Democratic Party (the Quebec branch of the Co-operative Commonwealth Federation) participated in the election, led by trade unionist Michel Chartrand. Lacking funds, however, it failed to present a candidate.

On March 18, 1960, an Act was passed that raised the number of seats in the legislature to 95:

- Duplessis, named in honour of the late premier, was created from parts of Saguenay.
- Bourget was carved out of Laval.

The writ of election dropped on April 27, setting the electoral campaign in motion.

== Campaign ==
Despite the Liberal Party's ambitious program and the disarray of the UN, it was difficult to predict the outcome of the vote at the outset of the campaign. The incumbent party still enjoyed significant support and many constituencies faced close races. No leaders' debate was held as the parties could not agree on a format.

The campaign revolved around the two leaders, Barrette and Lesage. Barrette stressed continuity with his predecessors, frequently appearing in publicity campaigns featuring Duplessis and Sauvé. He travelled across the province, relying more on voters' faith in him personally than on an electoral platform, which the UN did not publish. At the beginning of the campaign, he even wrote in the party's organ Montréal-Matin: "Our program was formulated in 1931 and current legislation bears witness to its implementation."

Lesage meanwhile led an "American-style" campaign, focusing on voter outreach to counter the public's perception of him as haughty. He took inspiration from Harry Truman, sometimes spending up to three days in the same region listening to local demands.

The majority of races were two- and three-way contests, but some ridings had more fractured campaigns:

Riding contests, by number of candidates (1960)
Candidates	Lib	UN	Ind	I-UN	I-Lib	Comm	Lib-Rép	PSD	CF	UN-Lab	Lab	Total
2	58	58										116
3	25	25	4	13	6			1		1		75
4	8	8	6	4	4		1		1			32
5	1	1		1	1	1						5
>5	3	3	4	4	9	1					1	25
Total	95	95	14	22	20	2	1	1	1	1	1	253

Ridings with more than five candidates (1960)
Riding	Lib	UN	Ind	I-UN	I-Lib	Comm	Lib-Rép	PSD	CF	UN-Lab	Lab	Total
Montréal–Saint-Henri	1	1	2	1	1							6
Maisonneuve	1	1		2	2	1						7
Montréal–Saint-Louis	1	1	2	1	6						1	12
Total	3	3	4	4	9	1					1	25

=== Controversy in L'Assomption ===
After a judicial recount, the UN had won L'Assomption by only one vote. In July 1961, a panel of judges overturned the result, voiding the reelection of Victor-Stanislas Chartrand and declaring the Liberal candidate Frédéric Coiteux the victor by 10 votes. Allegations of voter impersonation, threats and bribery were cited by the judges in voiding 11 votes in the count. Chartrand had attempted to resign his seat and thus trigger a byelection, but that was not accepted pending the outcome in court.

== Results ==
Elections to the Legislative Assembly of Quebec (1960)
Political party	Party leader	MPPs				Votes			
Political party	Party leader	Candidates	1956	1960	±	#	±	%	± (pp)
Liberal	Jean Lesage	95	20	51	31▲	1,077,135	248,871▲	51.38%	6.50▲
Union Nationale	Antonio Barrette	95	72	43	29▼	977,307	21,225▲	46.61%	5.19▼
Independent		14	1	1	Steady	22,187	11,018▼	1.06%	0.74▼
Independent-Unionist		22	–	–	–	10,531	6,423▲	0.50%	0.28▲
Independent-Liberal		20	–	–	–	8,208	3,770▲	0.39%	0.15▲
Other candidates									
█ Communist (Note: Campaigned in 1956 under the Labor-Progressive banner)		2	–	–	–	536	5,981▼	0.03%	0.33▼
█ Libéral républicain		1	–	–	–	188	188▲	0.01%	New
█ Social Democratic		1	–	–	–	166	11,066▼	0.01%	0.60▼
█ Capital familial		1	–	–	–	144	51▲	0.01%	–
█ UN-Labour		1	–	–	–	134	382▼	0.01%	0.02▼
█ Labour		1	–	–	–	50	1,224▼	0.00%	0.07▼
Total		253	93	95		2,096,586		100%	
Rejected ballots						33,521	4,740▲		
Voter turnout						2,130,107	255,597▲	81.66	3.34▲
Registered electors						2,608,439	215,079▲		

=== Vote and seat summaries ===
Ternary plots - shift of electoral support (1956-1960)
1956

1960
Electoral districts identified by colours of winning parties

Seats and popular vote by party
Party	Seats	Votes	Change (pp)
█ Liberal	52 / 95	51.38%	6.50
█ Union Nationale	42 / 95	46.61%	-5.19
█ Independent	1 / 95	1.06%	-0.74
█ Other	0 / 95	0.95%	-0.57

=== Synopsis of results ===
Results by riding - 1960 Quebec general election
Riding	Winning party						Turnout (Note: including spoilt ballots)	Votes						
Name	1956	Party	Votes	Share	Margin #	Margin %	Turnout	Lib	UN	Ind	I-UN	I-Lib	Other	Total
Abitibi-Est	UN	Lib	14,061	51.25%	852	3.11%	86.12%	14,061	13,209	–	–	–	166	27,436
Abitibi-Ouest	Lib	Lib	6,321	52.78%	666	5.56%	90.08%	6,321	5,655	–	–	–	–	11,976
Argenteuil	UN	UN	8,835	60.02%	2,951	20.05%	89.88%	5,884	8,835	–	–	–	–	14,719
Arthabaska	UN	Lib	10,609	53.09%	1,269	6.35%	93.52%	10,609	9,340	–	–	35	–	19,984
Bagot	UN	UN	5,335	55.84%	1,116	11.68%	91.53%	4,219	5,335	–	–	–	–	9,554
Beauce	UN	Lib	12,939	54.07%	1,946	8.13%	87.31%	12,939	10,993	–	–	–	–	23,932
Beauharnois	UN	UN	11,385	49.86%	148	0.65%	91.88%	11,237	11,385	–	85	128	–	22,835
Bellechasse	UN	Lib	5,601	52.06%	444	4.13%	86.88%	5,601	5,157	–	–	–	–	10,758
Berthier	UN	UN	6,669	52.65%	809	6.39%	89.56%	5,860	6,669	138	–	–	–	12,667
Bonaventure	Lib	Lib	8,513	51.61%	532	3.23%	86.03%	8,513	7,981	–	–	–	–	16,494
Bourget	New	Lib	34,411	53.08%	5,270	8.13%	75.94%	34,411	29,141	–	–	1,277	–	64,829
Brome	Lib	Lib	3,578	55.51%	710	11.01%	87.15%	3,578	2,868	–	–	–	–	6,446
Chambly	Lib	Lib	25,921	49.91%	599	1.15%	79.01%	25,921	25,322	–	–	688	–	51,931
Champlain	UN	UN	11,572	50.32%	147	0.64%	91.87%	11,425	11,572	–	–	–	–	22,997
Charlevoix	UN	UN	7,097	52.60%	702	5.20%	87.84%	6,395	7,097	–	–	–	–	13,492
Châteauguay	UN	UN	7,539	53.44%	1,276	9.05%	88.10%	6,263	7,539	–	305	–	–	14,107
Chicoutimi	UN	UN	16,749	51.32%	860	2.63%	89.96%	15,889	16,749	–	–	–	–	32,638
Compton	Lib	UN	5,725	53.77%	802	7.53%	89.31%	4,923	5,725	–	–	–	–	10,648
Deux-Montagnes	UN	Lib	6,978	50.15%	299	2.15%	89.43%	6,978	6,679	121	137	–	–	13,915
Dorchester	UN	UN	8,002	50.92%	288	1.83%	86.74%	7,714	8,002	–	–	–	–	15,716
Drummond	UN	Lib	12,268	50.21%	101	0.41%	92.04%	12,268	12,167	–	–	–	–	24,435
Duplessis	New	Lib	6,552	56.31%	1,528	13.13%	78.05%	6,552	5,024	–	60	–	–	11,636
Frontenac	UN	UN	6,418	51.77%	438	3.53%	90.59%	5,980	6,418	–	–	–	–	12,398
Gaspé-Nord	UN	Lib	4,824	49.79%	11	0.11%	88.24%	4,824	4,813	–	51	–	–	9,688
Gaspé-Sud	UN	UN	7,656	52.72%	791	5.45%	90.34%	6,865	7,656	–	–	–	–	14,521
Gatineau	UN	UN	9,846	55.42%	2,140	12.05%	80.51%	7,706	9,846	–	214	–	–	17,766
Hull	Lib	Lib	15,195	60.90%	5,692	22.81%	84.36%	15,195	9,503	–	–	252	–	24,950
Huntingdon	UN	UN	3,671	56.75%	873	13.50%	85.85%	2,798	3,671	–	–	–	–	6,469
Iberville	UN	Lib	4,124	53.52%	542	7.03%	92.81%	4,124	3,582	–	–	–	–	7,706
Îles-de-la-Madeleine	UN	UN	2,759	56.99%	677	13.98%	91.24%	2,082	2,759	–	–	–	–	4,841
Jacques-Cartier	Lib	Lib	46,024	59.32%	16,325	21.04%	73.08%	46,024	29,699	–	1,529	336	–	77,588
Joliette	UN	UN	12,479	64.75%	5,685	29.50%	89.70%	6,794	12,479	–	–	–	–	19,273
Jonquière-Kénogami	UN	Lib	15,310	56.86%	6,014	22.33%	89.82%	15,310	9,296	2,134	–	–	188	26,928
Kamouraska	UN	UN	6,056	53.84%	864	7.68%	84.65%	5,192	6,056	–	–	–	–	11,248
L'Assomption	UN	Lib	7,999	49.73%	10	0.06%	89.16%	7,999	7,989	–	94	–	–	16,082
L'Islet	UN	Lib	5,862	58.09%	1,632	16.17%	86.47%	5,862	4,230	–	–	–	–	10,092
Labelle	UN	UN	5,857	52.33%	522	4.66%	89.81%	5,335	5,857	–	–	–	–	11,192
Lac-Saint-Jean	UN	Lib	9,844	56.65%	2,310	13.29%	91.75%	9,844	7,534	–	–	–	–	17,378
Laval	UN	Lib	51,752	56.43%	11,790	12.86%	80.21%	51,752	39,962	–	–	–	–	91,714
Laviolette	UN	UN	11,013	51.71%	728	3.42%	88.87%	10,285	11,013	–	–	–	–	21,298
Lévis	UN	Lib	13,194	54.74%	2,286	9.48%	90.25%	13,194	10,908	–	–	–	–	24,102
Lotbinière	UN	UN	6,272	50.65%	161	1.30%	90.17%	6,111	6,272	–	–	–	–	12,383
Maisonneuve	UN	UN	22,682	46.10%	2,130	4.33%	73.78%	20,552	22,682	–	3,147	2,443	373	49,197
Maskinongé	UN	UN	5,481	54.29%	867	8.59%	92.95%	4,614	5,481	–	–	–	–	10,095
Matane	UN	Lib	9,131	53.55%	1,210	7.10%	84.38%	9,131	7,921	–	–	–	–	17,052
Matapédia	UN	Lib	7,263	56.76%	1,730	13.52%	86.25%	7,263	5,533	–	–	–	–	12,796
Mégantic	UN	Lib	14,221	59.22%	4,427	18.43%	91.88%	14,221	9,794	–	–	–	–	24,015
Missisquoi	UN	UN	7,867	57.74%	2,108	15.47%	89.83%	5,759	7,867	–	–	–	–	13,626
Montcalm	UN	UN	4,432	51.49%	441	5.12%	90.35%	3,991	4,432	184	–	–	–	8,607
Montmagny	UN	Lib	5,865	49.89%	9	0.08%	89.21%	5,865	5,856	–	35	–	–	11,756
Montmorency	UN	UN	6,266	54.38%	1,009	8.76%	90.98%	5,257	6,266	–	–	–	–	11,523
Montréal–Jeanne-Mance	UN	UN	38,015	51.32%	2,467	3.33%	74.86%	35,548	38,015	–	515	–	–	74,078
Montréal-Laurier	UN	Lib	14,012	47.83%	129	0.44%	79.31%	14,012	13,883	489	–	910	–	29,294
Montréal-Mercier	UN	UN	16,423	51.46%	929	2.91%	74.84%	15,494	16,423	–	–	–	–	31,917
Montréal–Notre-Dame-de-Grâce	Lib	Lib	29,857	66.18%	14,602	32.37%	60.87%	29,857	15,255	–	–	–	–	45,112
Montréal-Outremont	Lib	Lib	27,069	62.98%	15,174	35.30%	58.38%	27,069	11,895	4,017	–	–	–	42,981
Montréal–Saint-Henri	Lib	Lib	17,820	49.87%	1,387	3.88%	74.92%	17,820	16,433	385	420	672	–	35,730
Montréal–Saint-Jacques	UN	UN	9,190	53.08%	1,463	8.45%	66.19%	7,727	9,190	–	186	211	–	17,314
Montréal–Saint-Louis	Lib	Lib	10,580	41.06%	101	0.39%	61.34%	10,580	10,479	3,569 (Note: including Dave Rochon (3,447 votes), previously elected as Liberal MPP in 1956, but resigned from the party in June 1957)	213	876	50	25,767
Montréal–Sainte-Anne	Ind	Ind	9,206	57.90%	3,754	23.61%	63.73%	5,452	1,243	9,206	–	–	–	15,901
Montréal–Sainte-Marie	UN	UN	15,690	56.95%	4,328	15.71%	71.40%	11,362	15,690	–	498	–	–	27,550
Montréal-Verdun	Lib	Lib	18,354	57.64%	5,397	16.95%	72.26%	18,354	12,957	–	97	269	163	31,840
Napierville-Laprairie	UN	UN	8,551	50.05%	16	0.09%	90.06%	8,535	8,551	–	–	–	–	17,086
Nicolet	UN	UN	7,281	52.86%	788	5.72%	84.45%	6,493	7,281	–	–	–	–	13,774
Papineau	UN	UN	11,941	53.74%	1,661	7.47%	90.51%	10,280	11,941	–	–	–	–	22,221
Pontiac	UN	UN	5,181	58.37%	1,486	16.74%	82.14%	3,695	5,181	–	–	–	–	8,876
Portneuf	UN	Lib	12,086	54.45%	1,975	8.90%	91.19%	12,086	10,111	–	–	–	–	22,197
Québec-Centre	UN	UN	9,480	53.50%	1,239	6.99%	83.93%	8,241	9,480	–	–	–	–	17,721
Québec-Comté	UN	Lib	27,839	55.95%	7,153	14.38%	88.18%	27,839	20,686	–	1,232	–	–	49,757
Québec-Est	UN	UN	20,536	52.32%	1,956	4.98%	88.68%	18,580	20,536	–	–	–	134	39,250
Québec-Ouest	Lib	Lib	11,635	55.87%	2,523	12.11%	87.04%	11,635	9,112	–	79	–	–	20,826
Richelieu	UN	Lib	9,617	52.91%	1,145	6.30%	88.91%	9,617	8,472	88	–	–	–	18,177
Richmond	Lib	Lib	9,691	53.50%	1,269	7.01%	90.57%	9,691	8,422	–	–	–	–	18,113
Rimouski	Lib	Lib	11,585	55.84%	2,422	11.67%	85.70%	11,585	9,163	–	–	–	–	20,748
Rivière-du-Loup	Lib	Lib	8,671	51.71%	572	3.41%	88.58%	8,671	8,099	–	–	–	–	16,770
Roberval	UN	Lib	12,761	58.50%	3,971	18.21%	87.78%	12,761	8,790	–	261	–	–	21,812
Rouville	UN	UN	5,915	52.71%	609	5.43%	89.07%	5,306	5,915	–	–	–	–	11,221
Rouyn-Noranda	Lib	Lib	8,387	52.29%	735	4.58%	88.47%	8,387	7,652	–	–	–	–	16,039
Saguenay	UN	Lib	10,475	59.14%	3,237	18.27%	80.09%	10,475	7,238	–	–	–	–	17,713
Saint-Hyacinthe	Lib	Lib	11,456	55.16%	2,144	10.32%	85.60%	11,456	9,312	–	–	–	–	20,768
Saint-Jean	UN	Lib	8,869	50.60%	210	1.20%	91.85%	8,869	8,659	–	–	–	–	17,528
Saint-Maurice	Lib	Lib	15,040	53.12%	1,767	6.24%	91.02%	15,040	13,273	–	–	–	–	28,313
Saint-Sauveur	UN	UN	14,216	58.79%	4,252	17.58%	88.63%	9,964	14,216	–	–	–	–	24,180
Shefford	UN	UN	12,286	52.98%	1,383	5.96%	88.16%	10,903	12,286	–	–	–	–	23,189
Sherbrooke	UN	Lib	17,661	51.02%	1,396	4.03%	84.11%	17,661	16,265	–	692	–	–	34,618
Stanstead	UN	Lib	8,234	51.28%	410	2.55%	86.51%	8,234	7,824	–	–	–	–	16,058
Témiscamingue	UN	UN	4,289	53.44%	552	6.88%	89.78%	3,737	4,289	–	–	–	–	8,026
Témiscouata	UN	UN	5,606	53.46%	726	6.92%	86.55%	4,880	5,606	–	–	–	–	10,486
Terrebonne	UN	Lib	25,936	58.72%	8,387	18.99%	89.07%	25,936	17,549	–	681	–	–	44,166
Trois-Rivières	UN	UN	13,221	46.65%	103	0.36%	89.22%	13,118	13,221	1,856	–	–	144	28,339
Vaudreuil-Soulanges	UN	Lib	9,051	50.41%	149	0.83%	90.85%	9,051	8,902	–	–	–	–	17,953
Verchères	UN	Lib	5,583	50.01%	63	0.56%	91.08%	5,583	5,520	–	–	60	–	11,163
Westmount–Saint-Georges	Lib	Lib	10,988	61.75%	4,183	23.51%	55.12%	10,988	6,805	–	–	–	–	17,793
Wolfe	UN	Lib	3,972	51.85%	334	4.36%	92.17%	3,972	3,638	–	–	51	–	7,661
Yamaska	UN	UN	4,030	56.51%	929	13.03%	87.84%	3,101	4,030	–	–	–	–	7,131

= open seat
= turnout is above provincial average
= winning candidate was in previous Legislature
= incumbent had switched allegiance
= not incumbent; was previously elected to the Legislature
= incumbency arose from byelection gain
= other incumbents renominated
= multiple candidates
= adjusted on judicial recount

=== Analysis ===
Party candidates in 2nd place
Party in 1st place	Party in 2nd place		Total
Party in 1st place	Lib	UN	Total
Liberal		52	52
Union Nationale	42		42
Independent	1		1
Total	43	52	95

Candidates ranked 1st to 5th place, by party
Parties	1st	2nd	3rd	4th	5th
█ Liberal	52	43			
█ Union Nationale	42	52	1		
█ Independent	1		7	3	1
█ Independent UN			15	4	3
█ Independent Liberal			12	2	
█ Social Democratic			1		
█ UN-Labour			1		
█ Communist				1	
█ Capital familial				1	
█ Libéral républicain				1	

Resulting composition of the 27th Quebec Legislative Assembly
Source		Party			
Source		Lib	UN	Ind	Total
Seats retained	Incumbents returned	16	40	1	57
Seats retained	Open seats held	1	1		2
Seats retained	Ouster of incumbent	1			1
Seats changing hands	Incumbents defeated	23			23
Seats changing hands	Incumbents defeated - previous incumbents returned	3			3
Seats changing hands	Open seats gained	5			5
Seats changing hands	Open seats gained - previous incumbents returned	1			1
Seats changing hands	Byelection gain held		1		1
New ridings	New MPPs elected	2			2
Total		52	42	1	95

== See also ==
- List of Quebec premiers
- Politics of Quebec
- Timeline of Quebec history
- List of Quebec political parties
- 26th Legislative Assembly of Quebec
