= 2026 Chicoutimi provincial by-election =

Provincial by-election in Quebec, Canada

- February 23, 2026

Riding of Chicoutimi
- Turnout: 34.22% (▼34.51%)
| | First party | Second party | Third party |
|---|---|---|---|
| | PQ | PCQ | CAQ |
| Candidate | Marie-Karlynn Laflamme | Catherine Morissette | Francis Tremblay |
| Party | Parti Québécois | Conservative | Coalition Avenir Québec |
| Popular vote | 6,999 | 4,023 | 1,848 |
| Percentage | 45.35% | 26.07% | 11.97% |
| Swing | ▲31.14 pp | ▲17.64 pp | ▼50.30 pp |
| | Fourth party | Fifth party |
| | PLQ | QS |
| Candidate | Tricia Murray | Jeanne Palardy |
| Party | Liberal | Québec solidaire |
| Popular vote | 1,409 | 862 |
| Percentage | 9.13% | 5.59% |
| Swing | ▲6.09 pp | ▼6.46 pp |
MNA before election
Andrée Laforest
Coalition Avenir Québec
Elected MNA
Marie-Karlynn Laflamme
Parti Québécois

The 2026 Chicoutimi provincial by-election was held on February 23, 2026. The seat was represented by Andrée Laforest of the CAQ until she resigned on September 4, 2025 to run for mayor in the 2025 Saguenay municipal election.

Marie-Karlynn Laflamme for the Parti Québécois won the election. It was the PQ 4th consecutive byelection win.

== Background ==
The district is located within the city of Saguenay and consists of part of the borough of Chicoutimi. The district was held by Union Nationale from 1936 to 1973 and the Parti Québécois from 1973 to 2018. The Coalition Avenir Québec took the seat in 2018 and held it in 2022.

== Candidates ==
- Tricia Murray (Quebec Liberal Party)
- Marie-Karlynn Laflamme (Parti Québécois)
- Olivier Dion (Climat Québec)
- Catherine Morissette (Conservative)
- Jeanne Palardy (Québec solidaire)
- Francis Tremblay (Coalition Avenir Québec)

== Result ==
Quebec provincial by-election, February 23, 2026: Chicoutimi Resignation of Andrée Laforest (September 4, 2025)
| Party | Candidate | Votes | % | ±% |
|---|---|---|---|---|
| Parti Québécois | Marie-Karlynn Laflamme | 6,999 | 45.35 | +31.14 |
| Conservative | Catherine Morissette | 4,023 | 26.07 | +17.64 |
| Coalition Avenir Québec | Francis Tremblay | 1,848 | 11.97 | −50.30 |
| Liberal | Tricia Murray | 1,409 | 9.13 | +6.09 |
| Québec solidaire | Jeanne Palardy | 862 | 5.59 | −6.46 |
| Climat Québec | Olivier Dion | 223 | 1.44 | — |
| Parti populaire | François Sabourin | 69 | 0.45 | — |
| Total valid votes | | 15,433 | 98.53 | |
| Total rejected ballots | | 230 | 1.47 | +0.13 |
| Turnout | | 15,663 | 34.22 | -34.51 |
| Electors | | 45,778 | | |
| Parti Québécois gain from Coalition Avenir Québec | | Swing | | +40.72 |
Source: Élections Québec

== Previous result ==
2022 Quebec general election: Chicoutimi
| Party | Candidate | Votes | % | ±% |
|---|---|---|---|---|
| Coalition Avenir Québec | Andrée Laforest | 19,345 | 62.28 | +23.02 |
| Parti Québécois | Alice Villeneuve | 4,415 | 14.21 | –10.75 |
| Québec solidaire | Adrien Guibert-Barthez | 3,741 | 12.04 | –0.84 |
| Conservative | Éric Girard | 2,619 | 8.43 | +7.05 |
| Liberal | Gabriel Caron | 943 | 3.04 | –16.70 |
| Total valid votes | | 31,063 | 98.66 | |
| Total rejected ballots | | 421 | 1.34 | –0.57 |
| Turnout | | 31,484 | 68.73 | +0.20 |
| Electors on the lists | | 45,810 | | |
| Coalition Avenir Québec hold | | Swing | | +16.88 |
Source: Élections Québec

== See also ==
- List of Quebec by-elections
