= Centre Georges-Vézina =

Arena in Saguenay, Quebec

Coordinates: 48°25′11″N 71°03′36″W

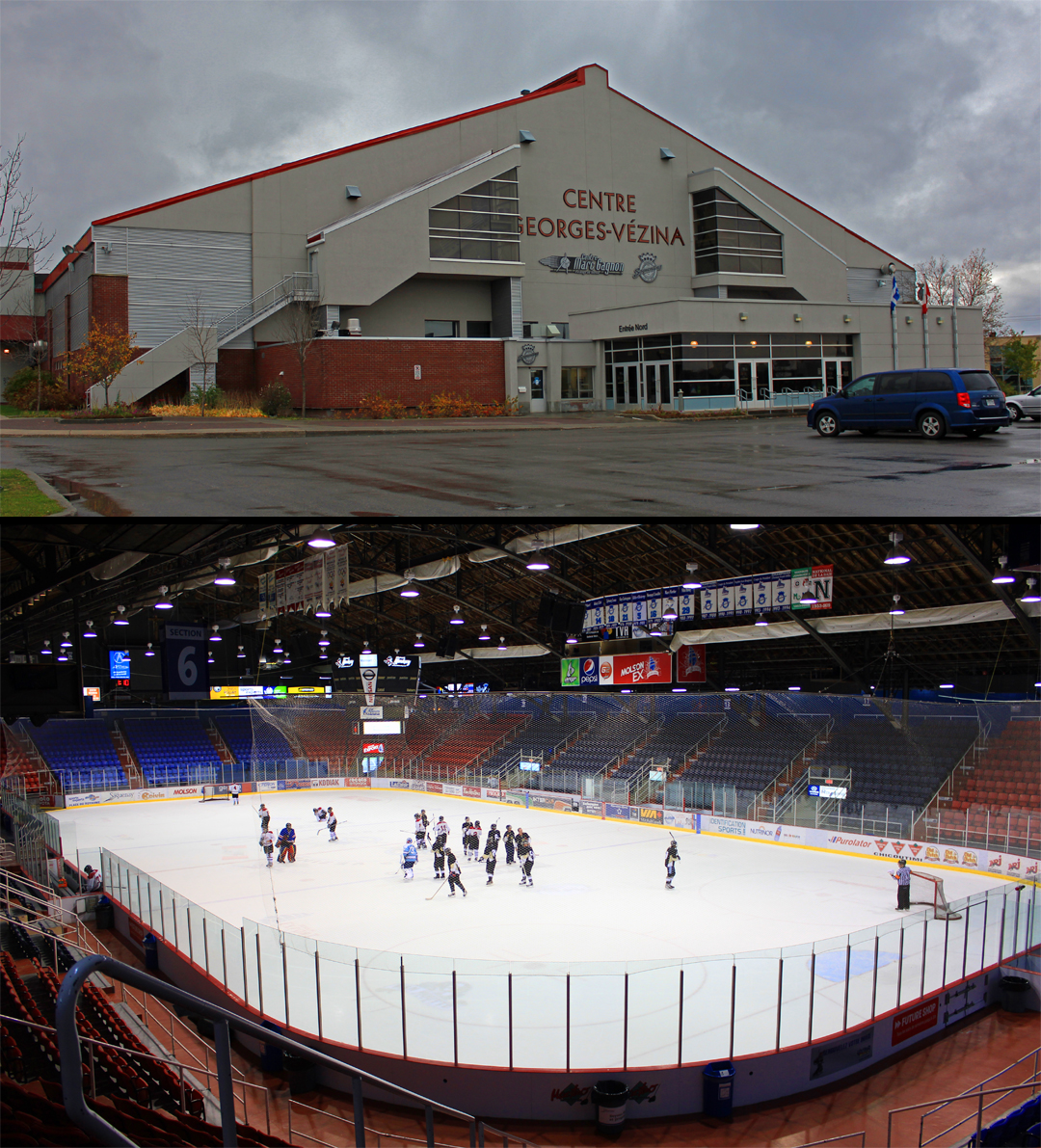

- Location within Quebec Location within Canada
- Address: 643, rue Bégin
- Location: Saguenay, Quebec, Canada
- Owner: City of Saguenay
- Capacity: 4,724

Construction
- Opened: 1949

Tenant
- Chicoutimi Saguenéens (1973–present)

The Centre Georges-Vézina, formerly the Colisée de Chicoutimi, is a 4,724 capacity (3,683 seated) multi-purpose arena in Saguenay, Quebec, Canada. The arena was built in 1949 and features an Olympic-sized ice pad of 200' X 100'.

It is named in honour of former Montreal Canadiens goalie and Chicoutimi native Georges Vézina.

It is home to the Chicoutimi Saguenéens ice hockey team of the Quebec Maritimes Junior Hockey League since 1973.

A proposal to build a new arena in downtown Chicoutimi was first put forward by mayor Josée Néron in 2018. The project did not move forward after the provincial government declined to provide funding. Current mayor Julie Dufour has instead proposed renovating Centre Georges-Vézina, changing the ice surface to the NHL-standard 200' X 85', and refitting the locker rooms, press box, and offices.
