= Ghislain Harvey =

Canadian politician (born 1946)

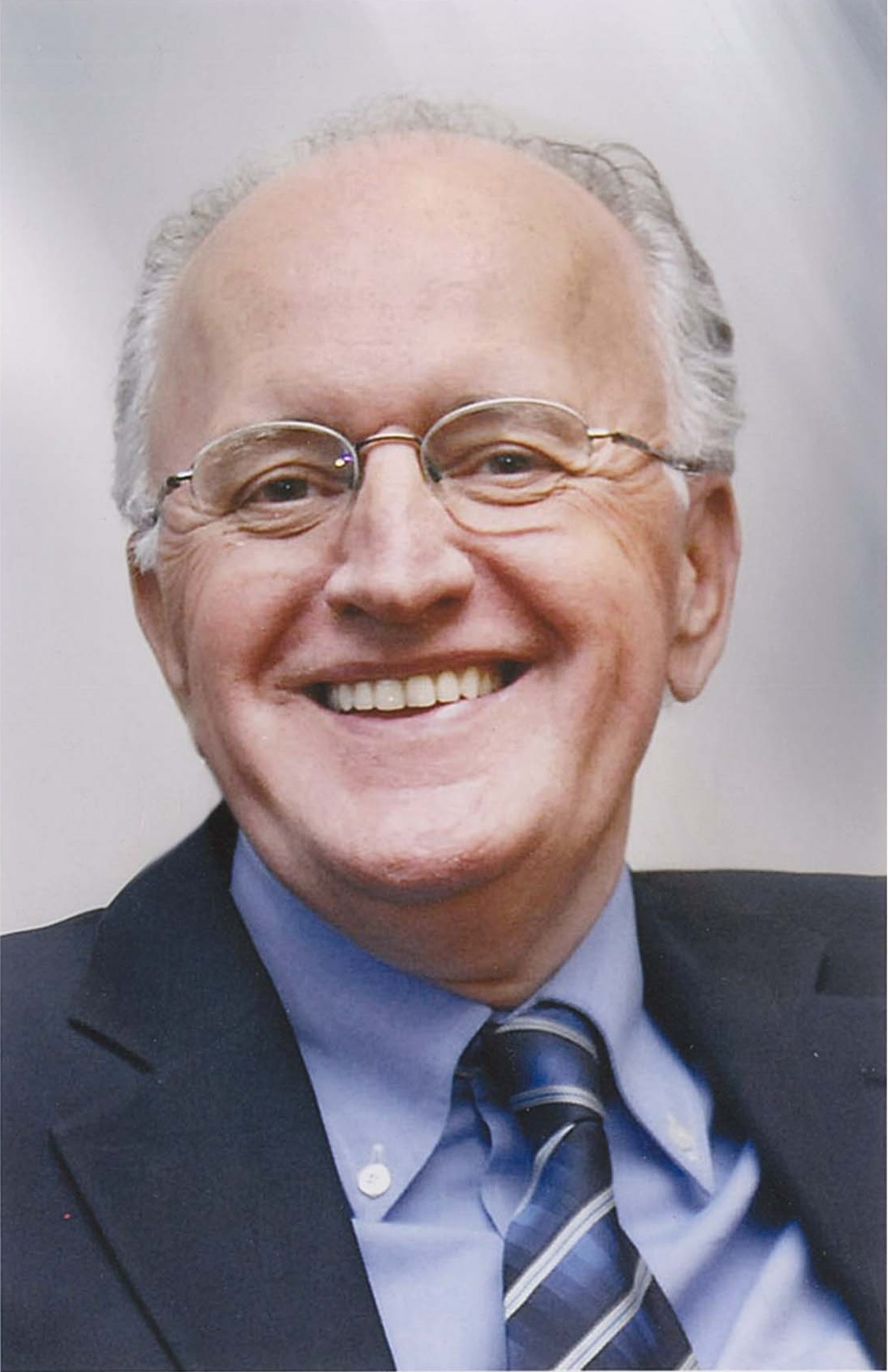
Ghislain Harvey

Ghislain Harvey (born May 6, 1946, in Bagotville, Quebec) was a member of the Quebec Provincial Parliament from 1973 to 1976.

In the 1973 Quebec general election, Harvey ran as a candidate for the Liberal Party of Quebec in Dubuc, defeating Parti Québécois candidate André Desgagné and Union Nationale incumbent Roch Boivin. However, in 1976, he lost to PQ candidate Hubert Desbiens.

Currently, Harvey serves as the Executive Vice President and General Manager of Promotion Saguenay Inc. From 1977 to 2002, he successively occupied the position of Head of Municipal Administration for La Baie, Chicoutimi and Saguenay.

He has a Bachelor of Human Sciences degree from l’Université du Québec à Chicoutimi and he is a member of the Order of Chartered Human Resources and Industrial Relations Advisors of Quebec. Mr. Harvey was appointed to the Royal Canadian Mint’s Board of Directors on October 21, 2003.

National Assembly of Quebec
Preceded by Roch Boivin (Union Nationale)	MLA for Dubuc; 1973–1976	Succeeded by Hubert Desbiens (Parti Québécois)
