= Julie Dufour (politician) =

Canadian politician (born 1980)

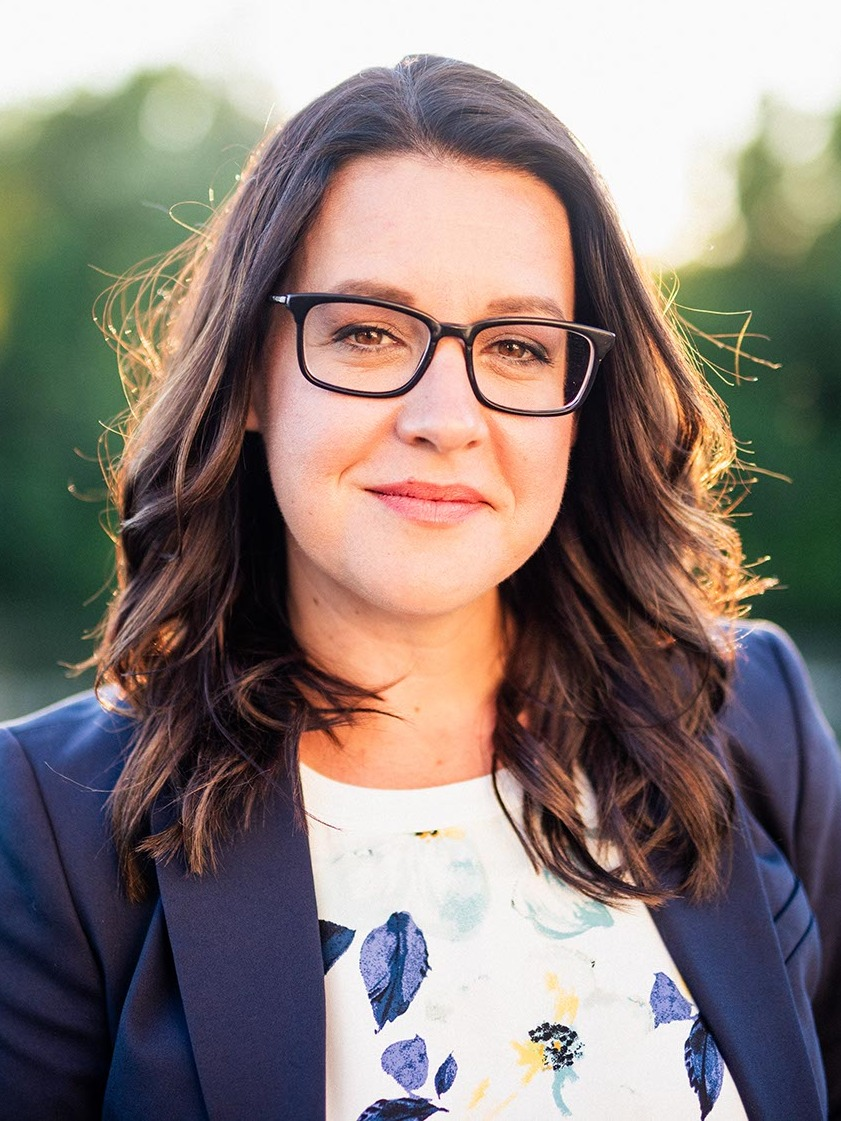
- Dufour in 2021

Mayor of Saguenay
- In office November 15, 2021 – November 18, 2025
- Preceded by: Josée Néron
- Succeeded by: Luc Boivin

Saguenay City Councillor
- In office November 2013 – November 2021
- Preceded by: Fabien Hovington
- Succeeded by: Claude Bouchard
- Constituency: District 2 (2017–2021); District 8 (2013–2017)

Jonquière Borough President
- In office December 2017 – November 2021
- Preceded by: Carl Dufour
- Succeeded by: Carl Dufour

Personal details
- Party: Independent
- Occupation: Educator

Julie Dufour (born c. 1980) is a Canadian politician. She served as the mayor of Saguenay, Quebec, from 2021 to 2025.

== Early career ==
Dufour holds college diplomas in human sciences from the Cégep de Chicoutimi and in special education technology the Cégep de Jonquière. She has also received university credits from the Université du Québec à Chicoutimi in administration, secondary education and psychology.

Prior to being elected, Dufour worked at a youth shelter from 2001 to 2008 and as a specialized educator at the Commission scolaire de la Jonquière from 2008 to 2013. While working for the school board, she also worked for the Cégep de Jonquière.

== Political career ==
Dufour was first elected to Saguenay City Council in the 2013 municipal elections representing District 8, which covered the former municipality of Shipshaw. She defeated incumbent councillor Fabien Hovington by about 100 votes. During her first term of office, she was well known for her opposition to mayor Jean Tremblay. In 2016, she filed a lawsuit against the city for not respecting the law in regards to the extension of the term of the auditor general.

Following redistricting, she was easily re-elected in the 2017 municipal elections in District 2, winning 64% of the vote, defeating candidates from the Équipe du renouveau démocratique and Parti des citoyens de Saguenay municipal parties. Dufour served as president of the borough of Jonquière from 2017 to 2021. She was elected to the position by Jonquière's city councillors following the 2017 elections, succeeding Carl Dufour.

Dufour entered the race for mayor of Sagenuay in February 2021, and was elected as mayor of Saguenay in the 2021 municipal elections, defeating the incumbent mayor Josée Néron and former Liberal provincial cabinet minister Serge Simard. She won over 25,000 votes, worth 48% of the electorate. Néron credited Dufour's victory to the promise of a tax freeze, while Dufour credited her victory due to her closeness to the voters during the campaign. Dufour also hailed her victory as unifying the amalgamated city, but Simard had the opposite view, claiming her win set the city back 20 years, pitting the city's two main boroughs of Jonquière and Chicoutimi against each other.

Dufour's first year in office was marked by a landslide in the La Baie borough of the city, as well as inflation and the lowest growth rate among the province's 10 largest cities.

In 2023, Dufour came under scrutiny for a number of different controversies. She refused to comment on why the city's director of legal affairs was suspended without pay before the 2022 Christmas holidays; She was criticized for outing the sexuality of the director of the Fire Safety Service; The Commission municipale du Québec received complaints against her improperly dismissing Jean-Luc Roberge as director general of the Société de transport du Saguenay; She claimed that she paid for her legal battles during the lawsuit against the city from her time as a councillor, but it was discovered that the city had to pay her legal fees of nearly $25,000; And, former mayor Néron filed a complaint to the Chief Electoral Officer of Quebec stating that Dufour offered Jean-Marc Crevier a labour relations consultant job if he agreed to not run for mayor in 2021. She was defeated in her bid for re-election in 2025, placing fourth with just over 2 per cent of the vote.
