= Sarah-Jane Barnes =

British-Canadian geologist

Sarah-Jane Barnes (born 1954) is a British-Canadian geologist, who is a professor at the Université du Québec à Chicoutimi and director of LabMaTer.

== Early life and education ==
Born in Chiswick in 1954, Barnes moved with her family to South Africa at the age of 6. As a child, she was passionate about science, and attended extra classes at an all-boys school in order to continue her scientific education past grade 8. She completed her B.Sc. (Hons) in geology and chemistry at the University of Witwatersrand, Johannesburg, in 1975. She later completed a graduate diploma in science in 1978 at the University of South Africa and in the following year, under the supervision of Dr. D Waters, Barnes received her MSc. that specialized on serpentines found in Namibia from the University of South Africa. Barnes completed her doctorate degree at the University of Toronto in 1983 on the platinum group element potentials of komatiites found in the Abitibi Belt in Northern Ontario. Following her doctorate, she began her post-doctoral studies on the Rana layered intrusion at the Geological Survey of Norway in 1984 under the supervision of Dr. R Boyd, completing it in 1986.

From 1983 to 1984, Barnes was an assistant professor at the University of Toronto, specializing in igneous, sedimentary and metamorphic petrology. She then proceeded to become an assistant professor on igneous petrogenesis and economic geology at the University of Quebec at Chicoutimi in 1986. In 1992, Barnes was an associate professor, later becoming a full professor in 1995.

As of 2019, Barnes has supervised over forty graduate students and postdoctoral fellows.

== Career ==
- 1976 - 1979: Geologist with the Geological Survey of South West Africa
- 1983 - 1984: Assistant professor, University of Toronto
- 1984 - 1986: Post-doctoral fellow with the Norwegian Council for Industrial and Scientific Research
- 1986 - 1992: Assistant professor
- 1991 - 1993: Canadian deep continental drilling committee, member
- 1992 - 1995: Associated professor
- 1995 - 1998: NSERC 08 committee member
- 1995 - 2003: Full Professor
- 1998 - 2002: Editor of Economic Geology and a co-leader of IGCP project 427- Dynamics of magmatic Ore systems
- 1999: NI-field symposium in Rouyn-Noranada, organiser
- 2000 - 2017: DIVEX committee member
- 2002: Editor for the special issue of Canadian Mineralogist which published the papers from the Rouyn Symposium
- 2003 - 2017: Canada Research Chair in Magmatic Ore Deposits
- 2006 - 2009: Society of Economics Geologists councillor
- 2012: Co-editor of a special issue of Chemical Geology

== Research ==
Barnes' research spans field geology, petrology, silicate and platinum group mineralogy, analytical chemistry, geochemical and experimental studies, and numerical modelling. Her research interests are in trace element geochemistry, studying ore deposits of nickel, copper, and platinum-group elements and their partition coefficients, and petrogenesis of komatiites, layered intrusions, and granites. She is also interested in nelsonites and deposits of iron, titanium, and vanadium oxides and their respective partition coefficients. Her primary research topics involve the origin of mafic and ultramafic magmas, the ore deposits associated with them, and the processes that occur to form concentrations of certain metals in mineral deposits of economic grade. The elements concentrated in these types of rocks are nickel, copper, titanium, vanadium, and platinum-group elements (platinum, palladium, rhodium, iridium, osmium, and ruthenium), which are normally collected from mafic magma by oxide minerals or sulphide liquid.

The purpose of her research is to resolve when and why sulphide liquid or oxide minerals separate from magma. She also studies where and why sulphide liquid or oxide minerals collect with metals. One crucial aspect of her research uses a technique developed at the University of Quebec in Chicoutimi to determine platinum-group elements and other trace metals at low concentrations in most types of rocks.

== Awards ==
- 2015 - Selected as Society of Economic Geologists Distinguished lecturer
- 2020 - elected to the Fellowship in the Royal Society of Canada

Barnes has presented 30 short courses directed to the geological field, and has published 135 academic articles
