= Jacques Côté =

Canadian politician and notary

MNA for Dubuc
- In office November 30, 1998 – November 5, 2008
- Preceded by: Gérard-Raymond Morin
- Succeeded by: Serge Simard

Personal details
- Born: April 19, 1944 (age 82) Chicoutimi, Quebec, Canada
- Party: Parti Québécois
- Profession: Notary

Jacques Côté (born April 19, 1944) was a politician and notary in Quebec, Canada. He was a Parti Québécois member of the National Assembly of Quebec for the electoral district of Dubuc from 1998 to 2008.

Côté holds a bachelor's degree in arts and a law license from the Université Laval, a bachelor's degree in political science from the Université du Québec à Montréal and a diploma from the Canadian Securities Institute. He then became a notary and legal adviser.

Cote was an active member of the Parti Québécois since 1970 as he was a member of the executive council, the treasurer, the legal adviser and the vice-president and president of the party for the Dubuc riding. He was also part of the YES committee for the 1980 Quebec referendum on sovereignty. He was also involved in the economic development of the La Baie region in Saguenay-Lac-Saint-Jean, and the regional board of the Caisses Desjardins.

He was first elected in the 1998 provincial election. He was Minister for Housing from January 30, 2002 until April 29, 2003. He was re-elected in the 2003 and 2007 elections. During his second mandate, he was named the assistant whip for the PQ until his retirement in 2008.
