= Roch Boivin =

Canadian politician (1912–1979)

Member of the Legislative Assembly of Quebec for Dubuc
- In office 1966–1973
- Preceded by: District created in 1965
- Succeeded by: Ghislain Harvey

Personal details
- Born: October 14, 1912 Chicoutimi, Quebec
- Died: January 17, 1979 (aged 66) Chicoutimi-Nord, Quebec
- Party: Union Nationale

Roch Boivin (October 14, 1912 – January 17, 1979) was a Canadian politician and a two-term Member of the Legislative Assembly of Quebec.

== Background ==
He was born on October 14, 1912, in Chicoutimi, Saguenay-Lac-Saint-Jean and became a physician.

== Mayor ==
Boivin served as Mayor of Chicoutimi-Nord, Quebec from 1949 to 1972.

== Member of the legislature ==
He ran as a Union Nationale candidate in the 1966 election in the provincial district of Dubuc and won. He was re-elected in the 1970 election.

== Cabinet Member ==
He was appointed to the Cabinet in 1966 and served as Minister without Portfolio assigned to Health until 1970. Boivin lost the 1973 election against Liberal candidate Ghislain Harvey.

== Death ==
He died on January 17, 1979.
