= Hubert Desbiens =

Member of the National Assembly of Quebec for Dubuc
- In office 1976–1989
- Preceded by: Ghislain Harvey
- Succeeded by: Gérard-Raymond Morin

Personal details
- Born: 20 March 1931 Lac-Bouchette, Quebec
- Died: 1 January 2009 (aged 77) Chicoutimi, Quebec
- Party: Parti Québécois
- Profession: politician

Hubert Desbiens (20 March 1931 – 1 January 2009) was a Canadian politician from Quebec from the Parti Québécois. He was a member of the National Assembly of Quebec for 15 years representing the district of Dubuc.

== Biography ==
Desbiens was born in Lac-Bouchette on March 20, 1931, to a merchant father and schoolteacher mother. Desbiens was Registrar of Dubuc County from 1967 to 1974, Secretary of the Saguenay-Lac-Saint-Jean Teachers' Union Federation in 1953, member of the Junior Chamber of Commerce, the Chamber of Commerce, and the Knights of Columbus and school commissioner in Chicoutimi-Nord from June 1964 to June 1968. He was elected to the National Assembly of Quebec in 1976.

Desbiens died on 1 January 2009.

== See also ==
- 33rd Quebec Legislature
- 32nd Quebec Legislature
- 31st Quebec Legislature
