= François Tremblay =

Canadian politician

Member of the National Assembly of Quebec for Dubuc
- In office October 1, 2018 – August 27, 2026
- Preceded by: Serge Simard
- Succeeded by: Émile Simard

Personal details
- Born: 1970 (age 55–56) Chicoutimi, Quebec
- Party: Independent (since 2026)
- Other political affiliations: Coalition Avenir Québec (until 2026)

François Tremblay is a Canadian politician, who was elected to the National Assembly of Quebec in the 2018 provincial election. He represented the electoral district of Dubuc as a member of the Coalition Avenir Québec (CAQ).

On 9 January 2026, Tremblay resigned from the CAQ caucus following an arrest for impaired driving. He did not seek re-election in the 2026 general election.

Tremblay served on Saguenay City Council from 2013 to 2017, serving as the chair of La Baie borough.

== Electoral record ==
2022 Quebec general election: Dubuc
Party	Candidate	Votes	%	±%
Coalition Avenir Québec	François Tremblay	15,427	57.60	+17.37
Parti Québécois	Émile Simard	4,699	17.55	–3.61
Conservative	Tommy Pageau	2,956	11.04	+8.58
Québec solidaire	Andrée-Anne Brillant	2,833	10.58	–1.50
Liberal	Berry Zinga Nkuni	666	2.49	–19.88
Climat Québec	Gilbert Simard	200	0.75	New
Total valid votes		26,781	98.54	
Total rejected ballots		396	1.46	–0.36
Turnout		27,177	65.05	–0.80
Electors on the lists		41,779		
Coalition Avenir Québec hold		Swing		+10.49
Source: Élections Québec

2018 Quebec general election: Dubuc
Party	Candidate	Votes	%	±%
Coalition Avenir Québec	François Tremblay	10,535	40.23	+21.35
Liberal	Serge Simard	5,859	22.37	-18.65
Parti Québécois	Marie-Annick Fortin	5,541	21.16	-10.98
Québec solidaire	Marie Francine Bienvenue	3,163	12.08	+6.7
Conservative	François Pelletier	645	2.46	–
Parti nul	Line Bélanger	445	1.7	–
Total valid votes		26,188	98.18	
Total rejected ballots		485	1.82	
Turnout		26,673	65.85	-4.63
Eligible voters		40,506		
Coalition Avenir Québec gain from Liberal		Swing		+20
Source(s) "Rapport des résultats officiels du scrutin". Élections Québec.
