= 2025 Saguenay municipal election =

Election in Quebec, Canada

- Mayoral election
- November 2, 2025
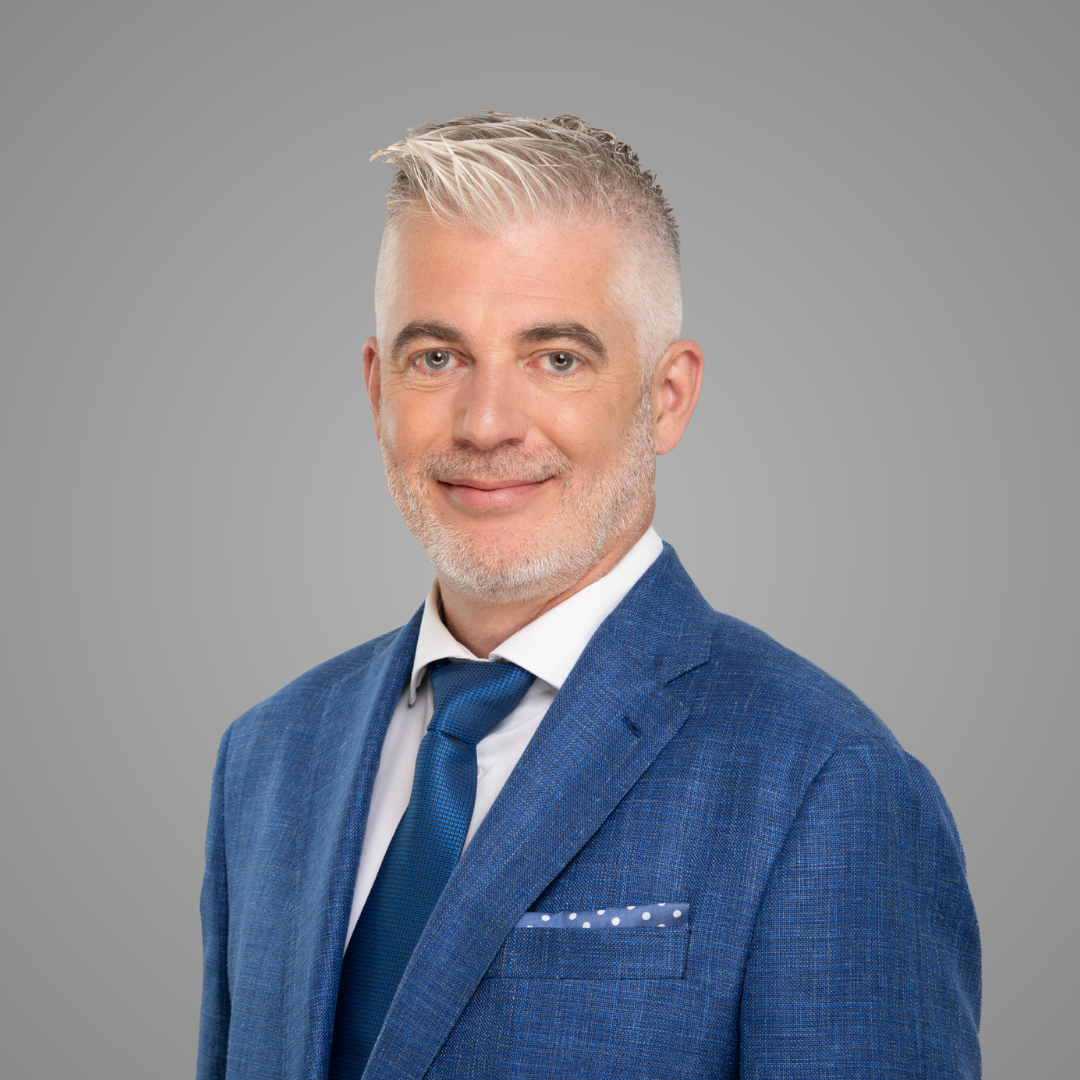

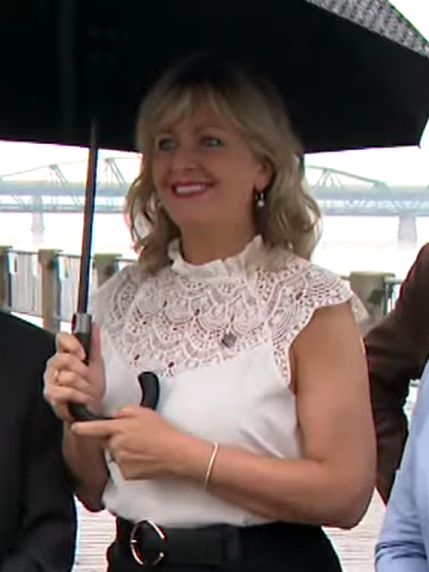

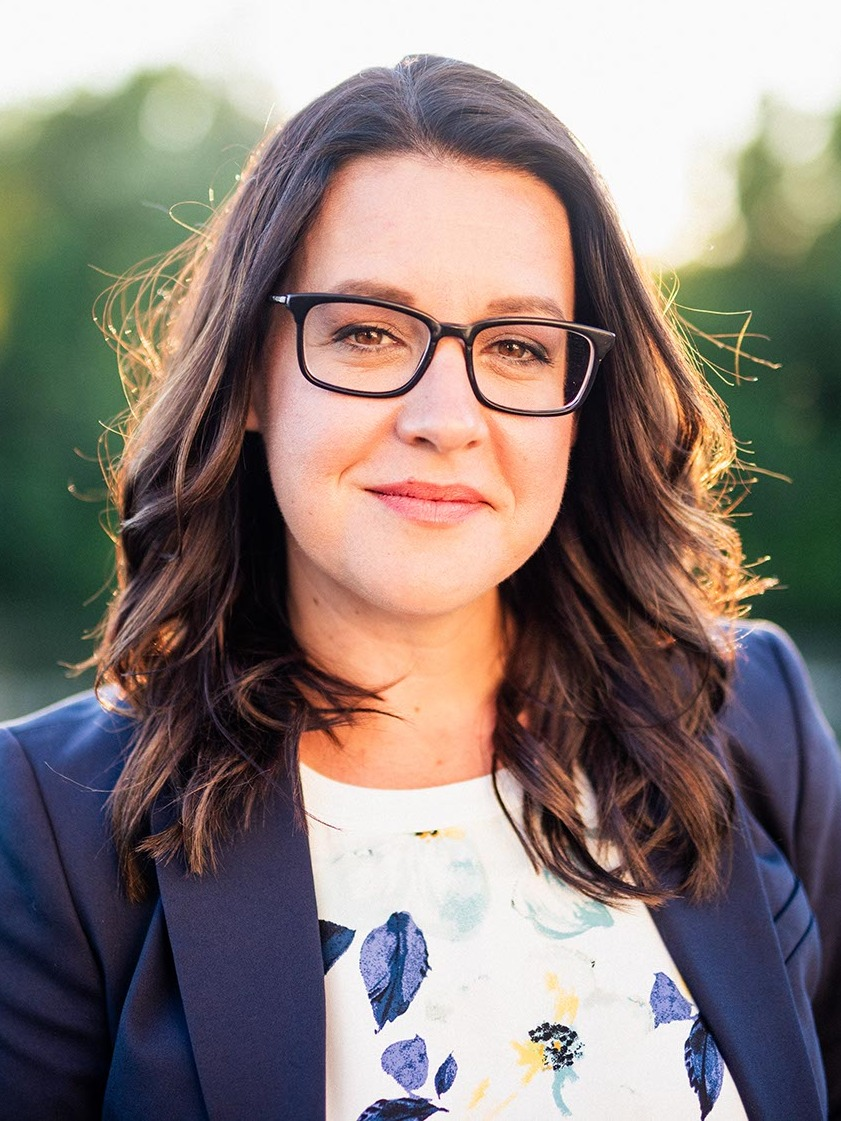
Nominee	Luc Boivin	Andrée Laforest
Party	Independent	Independent
Popular vote	28,775	28,543
Percentage	44.96%	44.60%
	CB
Nominee	Christine Basque	Julie Dufour
Party	ERD Saguenay	Independent
Popular vote	4,453	1,576
Percentage	6.96%	2.46%
Mayor before election
Julie Dufour
Independent
Elected mayor
Luc Boivin
Independent
- City Council election
- November 2, 2025
- 15 seats on Saguenay City Council; 8 seats needed for a majority
Party	Leader	Vote %	Seats	+/–
Independent	–		15	+1
This lists parties that won seats. See the complete results below.

The 2025 Saguenay municipal election took place on November 2, 2025, to elect a mayor and city councillors in Saguenay, Quebec, Canada. The election was held in conjunction with municipal elections held across Quebec on that date.

== Mayor ==
Party	Candidate	Vote	%
Independent	Luc Boivin	28,775	44.96
Independent	Andrée Laforest	28,543	44.60
ERD Saguenay	Christine Basque	4,453	6.96
Independent	Julie Dufour (X)	1,576	2.46
Independent	Jacques Pelletier	648	1.01

== City council ==
=== Jonquière ===
==== District 1 ====
Party	Candidate	Vote	%
Independent	Daniel Tremblay-Larouche	2,842	65.67
ERD Saguenay	Michel Bergeron	1,486	34.33

==== District 2 ====
Party	Candidate	Vote
Independent	Claude Bouchard (X)	Acclaimed

==== District 3 ====
Party	Candidate	Vote
Independent	Michel Thiffault (X)	Acclaimed

==== District 4 ====
Party	Candidate	Vote	%
Independent	Alain Doré	1,715	46.18
Independent	Mathieu Lamontagne	1,563	42.08
ERD Saguenay	Éric Larocque	436	11.74

==== District 5 ====
Party	Candidate	Vote	%
Independent	Carl Dufour (X)	4,285	83.72
ERD Saguenay	Christine Boivin	833	16.28

==== District 6 ====
Party	Candidate	Vote	%
Independent	Audrey Lapointe	3,346	75.70
ERD Saguenay	Benoit Tremblay	1,074	24.30

=== Chicoutimi ===
==== District 7 ====
Party	Candidate	Vote	%
Independent	Serge Gaudreault (X)	2,656	49.21
Independent	François Cormier	1,757	32.56
ERD Saguenay	Maxime Pepin-Larocque	984	18.23

==== District 8 ====
Party	Candidate	Vote	%
Independent	Cathy Fortin	1,841	47.39
Independent	Sylvain Leclerc	805	20.72
ERD Saguenay	Nadya Larouche	766	19.72
Unissons Saguenay	Emmanuelle Côté-Gingras	473	12.18

==== District 9 ====
Party	Candidate	Vote	%
Independent	Michel Tremblay (X)	3,318	71.46
ERD Saguenay	Éric Thibeault	904	19.47
Unissons Saguenay	Olivier Perron	421	9.07

==== District 10 ====
Party	Candidate	Vote	%
Independent	Jacques Cleary (X)	3,339	62.91
ERD Saguenay	Sylvain Villeneuve	1,969	37.09

==== District 11 ====
Party	Candidate	Vote	%
Independent	Joan Simard	2,131	45.92
ERD Saguenay	Roger Blackburn	1,191	25.66
Independent	Pierre Bergeron	890	19.18
Unissons Saguenay	Raphaël Émond	429	9.24

==== District 12 ====
Party	Candidate	Vote	%
Independent	May Gagnon	2,632	45.44
Independent	Christine Doré	1,161	20.04
Independent	Michel Potvin (X)	1,107	19.11
ERD Saguenay	Jocelyn Charest	627	10.83
Unissons Saguenay	Laurence Berger	265	4.58

=== La Baie ===
==== District 13 ====
Party	Candidate	Vote	%
Independent	Raynald Simard (X)	1,514	75.25
Independent	Chantale Côté	498	24.75

==== District 14 ====
Party	Candidate	Vote	%
Independent	Renée Simard	1,097	36.0026
Independent	Jean Tremblay (X)	1,094	35.9042
Independent	Luc Boudreault	856	28.0932

==== District 15 ====
Party	Candidate	Vote	%
Independent	François Fortin	1,962	64.16
Independent	Martin Harvey (X)	668	21.84
ERD Saguenay	Maxyme Lemieux	428	14.00
