= Gérard-Raymond Morin =

Canadian politician (1940–2024)

Member of the National Assembly of Quebec for Dubuc
- In office 25 September 1989 – 30 November 1998
- Preceded by: Hubert Desbiens
- Succeeded by: Jacques Côté

Personal details
- Born: 27 January 1940 La Baie, Quebec, Canada
- Died: 9 December 2024 (aged 84) La Baie, Quebec, Canada
- Party: Parti Québécois
- Profession: Politician

Gérard-Raymond Morin (27 January 1940 – 9 December 2024) was a Canadian politician. He served as the member for Dubuc in the National Assembly of Quebec as a member of the Parti Québécois from 1989 until 1998.

== Early career ==
Morin graduated in commerce from the Collège Saint-Joseph in La Baie in 1958. He was employed at Consolidated-Bathurst as a paper-maker.

He was the president of the Consolidated-Bathurst Plant National Union from 1976 to 1982.

== Political career ==
Morin was a municipal councillor from 1980 to 1984 and then was the mayor of La Baie from 1984 to 1988. He ran for election in Dubuc in 1989 and won, he was re-elected without any difficulty in 1994 as the Parti Québécois formed the government.

He was the parliamentary secretary to the minister responsible for the Saguenay–Lac-Saint-Jean region in the Bouchard government.

He did not seek re-election in 1998.

== Death ==
Morin died in La Baie on 9 December 2024, at the age of 84.

== Electoral record ==
=== Provincial ===
1994 Quebec general election
Party	Candidate	Votes	%
Parti Québécois	Gérard-Raymond Morin	16,759	63.50
Liberal	Jeanne Lavoie	7,142	27.06
Action démocratique	Jean-François Simard	2,162	8.19
Natural Law	Daniel Gaudet	328	1.24
Total valid votes		26,391	98.54
Total rejected ballots		392	1.46
Turnout		26,783	77.74
Electors on the lists		34.450	–

1989 Quebec general election
Party	Candidate	Votes	%
Parti Québécois	Gérard-Raymond Morin	12,589	54.91
Liberal	Antonin Tremblay	10,337	45.09
Total valid votes		22,926	96.49
Total rejected ballots		833	3.51
Turnout		23,759	73.07
Electors on the lists		32,517	–
