= Serge Simard =

Canadian politician

Member of the National Assembly of Quebec for Dubuc
- In office April 7, 2014 – August 29, 2018
- Preceded by: Jean-Marie Claveau
- Succeeded by: François Tremblay
- In office December 8, 2008 – September 4, 2012
- Preceded by: Jacques Côté
- Succeeded by: Jean-Marie Claveau

Personal details
- Born: 1950 (age 75–76) Chicoutimi, Quebec
- Party: Liberal

Serge Simard (born 1950) is a Canadian politician in the province of Quebec. Simard was elected to represent the riding of Dubuc in the National Assembly of Quebec in the 2008 provincial election. He is a member of the Quebec Liberal Party and the delegate Minister for Natural Resources.

A municipal councillor prior to his election, he was the president of the council in La Baie, a borough in the Saguenay region, and a member of several committees in the city of Saguenay. Prior to his political career, Simard obtained a degree from the Université Laval and worked for several years for the Mouvement Desjardins.
