= Dubuc (electoral district) =

Provincial electoral district in Quebec, Canada

Quebec electoral district
- Coordinates: 48.508°N 70.603°W

Provincial electoral district
- Legislature: National Assembly of Quebec
MNA
Émile Simard
Parti Québécois
- District created: 1965
- First contested: 1966
- Last contested: 2026

Demographics
- Electors (2012): 39,616
- Area (km²): 44,469.7
- Census division: Le Saguenay-et-son-Fjord (part)
- Census subdivision(s): Saguenay (part), Bégin, Ferland-et-Boilleau, L'Anse-Saint-Jean, Petit-Saguenay, Rivière-Éternité, Saint-Ambroise, Saint-Charles-de-Bourget, Saint-David-de-Falardeau, Saint-Félix-d'Otis, Saint-Fulgence, Saint-Honoré, Sainte-Rose-du-Nord; Lac-Ministuk, Lalemant, Mont-Valin

Dubuc (French pronunciation: [dybyk]) is a provincial electoral district in the Saguenay–Lac-Saint-Jean region of Quebec, Canada, which elects a member to the National Assembly of Quebec. It notably includes part of the city of Saguenay as well as Saint-Honoré and Saint-Ambroise.

It was created for the 1966 election from parts of Chicoutimi and Jonquière-Kénogami electoral districts.

In 2026, it lost the Barrière-Béthanie community in Saguenay.

== Members of the Legislative Assembly / National Assembly ==
Legislature	Years	Member	Party
Riding created from Chicoutimi and Jonquière-Kénogami
28th	1966–1970	Roch Boivin	Union Nationale
29th	1970–1973	Roch Boivin	Union Nationale
30th	1973–1976	Ghislain Harvey	Liberal
31st	1976–1981	Hubert Desbiens	Parti Québécois
32nd	1981–1985	Hubert Desbiens	Parti Québécois
33rd	1985–1989	Hubert Desbiens	Parti Québécois
34th	1989–1994	Gérard-Raymond Morin	Parti Québécois
35th	1994–1998	Gérard-Raymond Morin	Parti Québécois
36th	1998–2003	Jacques Côté	Parti Québécois
37th	2003–2007	Jacques Côté	Parti Québécois
38th	2007–2008	Jacques Côté	Parti Québécois
39th	2008–2012	Serge Simard	Liberal
40th	2012–2014	Jean-Marie Claveau	Parti Québécois
41st	2014–2018	Serge Simard	Liberal
42nd	2018–2022	François Tremblay	Coalition Avenir Québec
43rd	2022–2026	François Tremblay	Coalition Avenir Québec
43rd	2026–2026	François Tremblay	Independent
44th	2026–Present	Émile Simard	Parti Québécois

== Election results ==
2026 Quebec general election
** Preliminary results — Not yet official **
Party	Candidate	Votes	%	±%
Parti Québécois	Émile Simard	10,725	38.63	+21.11
Conservative	Catherine Morissette	7,894	28.43	+17.40
Coalition Avenir Québec	Marc Grandbois	3,987	14.36	–43.29
Liberal	Virginie Bouchard	3,151	11.35	+8.87
Québec solidaire	Ève Laguë	1,804	6.50	–4.09
Présence	Joelle Lavallée	202	0.73	N/A
Total valid votes		27,763	98.54	±0.00
Total rejected ballots		411	1.46	±0.00
Turnout		28,174	65.27	+0.22
Electors on the lists		43,166		
Parti Québécois notional gain from Coalition Avenir Québec		Swing		+1.86
Source: Élections Québec

2022 Quebec general election redistributed results
Party	Vote	%
Coalition Avenir Québec	15,539	57.65
Parti Québécois	4,723	17.52
Conservative	2,972	11.03
Québec solidaire	2,854	10.59
Liberal	668	2.48
Climat Québec	200	0.74

2022 Quebec general election
Party	Candidate	Votes	%	±%
Coalition Avenir Québec	François Tremblay	15,427	57.60	+17.37
Parti Québécois	Émile Simard	4,699	17.55	–3.61
Conservative	Tommy Pageau	2,956	11.04	+8.58
Québec solidaire	Andrée-Anne Brillant	2,833	10.58	–1.50
Liberal	Berry Zinga Nkuni	666	2.49	–19.88
Climat Québec	Gilbert Simard	200	0.75	New
Total valid votes		26,781	98.54	
Total rejected ballots		396	1.46	–0.36
Turnout		27,177	65.05	–0.80
Electors on the lists		41,779		
Coalition Avenir Québec hold		Swing		+10.49
Source: Élections Québec

2018 Quebec general election
Party	Candidate	Votes	%	±%
Coalition Avenir Québec	François Tremblay	10,535	40.23	+21.35
Liberal	Serge Simard	5,859	22.37	-18.65
Parti Québécois	Marie-Annick Fortin	5,541	21.16	-10.98
Québec solidaire	Marie Francine Bienvenue	3,163	12.08	+6.7
Conservative	François Pelletier	645	2.46	–
Parti nul	Line Bélanger	445	1.7	–
Total valid votes		26,188	98.18	
Total rejected ballots		485	1.82	
Turnout		26,673	65.85	-4.63
Eligible voters		40,506		
Coalition Avenir Québec gain from Liberal		Swing		+20
Source(s) "Rapport des résultats officiels du scrutin". Élections Québec.

2014 Quebec general election
Party	Candidate	Votes	%
Liberal	Serge Simard	11,386	41.02
Parti Québécois	Jean-Marie Claveau	8,919	32.13
Coalition Avenir Québec	Claudie Emond	5,240	18.88
Québec solidaire	Marie-Lise Chrétien-Pineault	1,494	5.38
Independent	Pascal Tremblay	431	1.55
Option nationale	Ariane Belva	285	1.03
Total valid votes		27,755	98.24
Total rejected ballots		496	1.76
Turnout		28,251	70.48
Electors on the lists		40,081	–

2012 Quebec general election
Party	Candidate	Votes	%
Parti Québécois	Jean-Marie Claveau	12,345	42.19
Liberal	Serge Simard	8,080	27.61
Coalition Avenir Québec	François Tremblay	6,921	23.65
Québec solidaire	Marie Francine Bienvenue	1,118	3.82
Option nationale	David Girard	343	1.17
Independent CAQ	Pascal Tremblay	270	0.92
Independent (Mouvement utopiste du Québec)	Charles-Olivier Bolduc Tremblay	185	0.63
Total valid votes		29,262	98.73
Total rejected ballots		377	1.27
Turnout		29,639	74.63
Electors on the lists		39,712	–

2008 Quebec general election
Party	Candidate	Votes	%	±%
Liberal	Serge Simard	9,723	42.85	
Parti Québécois	Andre Michaud	9,272	40.86	
Action démocratique	Robert Emond	2,789	12.29	
Québec solidaire	Marie-France Bienvenue	708	3.12	
Independent	Fernand Bouchard	199	0.88	–

2007 Quebec general election
Party	Candidate	Votes	%
Parti Québécois	Jacques Côté	10,120	37.58
Action démocratique	Robert Emond	8,401	31.20
Liberal	Johnny Simard	7,077	26.28
Québec solidaire	Marie Francine Bienvenue	728	2.70
Green	Michel Marécat	602	2.24
Total valid votes		26,928	98.98
Total rejected ballots		277	1.02
Turnout		27,205	73.22
Electors on the lists		37,154	–

2003 Quebec general election
Party	Candidate	Votes	%
Parti Québécois	Jacques Côté	9,767	38.90
Liberal	Johnny Simard	9,723	38.72
Action démocratique	Claude Gauthier	5,162	20.56
UFP	Marie Francine Bienvenue	457	1.82
Total valid votes		25,109	98.90
Total rejected ballots		280	1.10
Turnout		25,389	68.07
Electors on the lists		37,301	–

1998 Quebec general election
Party	Candidate	Votes	%
Parti Québécois	Jacques Côté	16,388	59.81
Liberal	Claude Richard	8,154	29.76
Action démocratique	Jacques Tremblay Jr.	2,858	10.43
Total valid votes		27,400	98.84
Total rejected ballots		321	1.16
Turnout		27,721	74.69
Electors on the lists		37,116	–

1995 Quebec referendum
Side	Votes	%
Oui	22,850	70.30
Non	9,653	29.70

1994 Quebec general election
Party	Candidate	Votes	%
Parti Québécois	Gérard-Raymond Morin	16,759	63.50
Liberal	Jeanne Lavoie	7,142	27.06
Action démocratique	Jean-François Simard	2,162	8.19
Natural Law	Daniel Gaudet	328	1.24
Total valid votes		26,391	98.54
Total rejected ballots		392	1.46
Turnout		26,783	77.74
Electors on the lists		34.450	–

1992 Charlottetown Accord referendum
Side	Votes	%
Non	20,211	74.97
Oui	6,749	25.03

1989 Quebec general election
Party	Candidate	Votes	%
Parti Québécois	Gérard-Raymond Morin	12,589	54.91
Liberal	Antonin Tremblay	10,337	45.09
Total valid votes		22,926	96.49
Total rejected ballots		833	3.51
Turnout		23,759	73.07
Electors on the lists		32,517	–

1985 Quebec general election
Party	Candidate	Votes	%
Parti Québécois	Hubert Desbiens	14,147	55.32
Liberal	Julien Tremblay	9,976	39.01
New Democratic	Hélène Bouchard	950	3.71
Progressive Conservative	Michel Dufresne	420	1.64
Christian Socialist	Manon Sévigny	81	0.32
Total valid votes		25,574	99.02
Total rejected ballots		254	0.98
Turnout		25,828	78.73
Electors on the lists		32,804	–

1981 Quebec general election
Party	Candidate	Votes	%
Parti Québécois	Hubert Desbiens	16,630	64.64
Liberal	Jean Halley	8,334	32.40
Union Nationale	Léo Marie Tremblay	762	2.96
Total valid votes		25,726	99.18
Total rejected ballots		212	0.82
Turnout		25,938	82.30
Electors on the lists		31,515	–

1980 Quebec referendum
Side	Votes	%
Oui	14,815	52.97
Non	13,155	47.03

1976 Quebec general election
Party	Candidate	Votes	%
Parti Québécois	Hubert Desbiens	11,337	44.67
Liberal	Ghislain Harvey	7,676	30.24
Union Nationale	Julien Gauvin	4,442	17.50
Ralliement créditiste	Antonio Brisson	1,926	7.59
Total valid votes		25,381	98.27
Total rejected ballots		446	1.73
Turnout		25,827	85.23
Electors on the lists		30,304	–

1973 Quebec general election
Party	Candidate	Votes	%
Liberal	Ghislain Harvey	11,042	30.24
Parti Québécois	André Desgagné	6,856	31.31
Union Nationale	Roch Boivin	2,139	9.77
Parti créditiste	Jules Larouche	1,858	8.49
Total valid votes		21,895	98.75
Total rejected ballots		277	1.25
Turnout		22,172	81.90
Electors on the lists		27,073	–

1970 Quebec general election
Party	Candidate	Votes	%
Union Nationale	Roch Boivin	8,793	36.19
Liberal	Léonce Mercier	8,353	34.38
Parti Québécois	Magella Tremblay	6,505	26.77
Parti créditiste	Léopold Brisson	647	2.66
Total valid votes		24,298	98.55
Total rejected ballots		357	1.45
Turnout		24,655	88.20
Electors on the lists		27,955	–

1966 Quebec general election
Party	Candidate	Votes	%
Union Nationale	Roch Boivin	7,829	37.16
Liberal	Eugène Lapointe	6,262	34.38
Independent	Laurier E. Simard	3,577	16.98
Ralliement national	Jacques Cayer	3,400	16.14
Total valid votes		21,068	98.71
Total rejected ballots		275	1.29
Turnout		21,343	84.30
Electors on the lists		25,317	–

== See also ==
- List of Quebec provincial electoral districts
- Canadian provincial electoral districts
