= Marie-Karlynn Laflamme =

Canadian politician

Marie-Karlynn Laflamme MNA

Member of the National Assembly of Quebec for Chicoutimi
- Incumbent
- Assumed office February 23, 2026
- Preceded by: Andrée Laforest

Personal details
- Born: 1978 (age 47–48) Chicoutimi, Quebec
- Party: Parti Québécois

Marie-Karlynn Laflamme is a Canadian politician and academic administrator who has served as the member of the National Assembly of Quebec (MNA) for Chicoutimi since a 2026 by-election. A member of the Parti Québécois, she defeated a Conservative Party of Quebec candidate and flipped a Coalition Avenir Québec seat. She ran for re-election and won in the Quebec general election of 2026. Laflamme previously served as the vice-rector of the Université du Québec à Chicoutimi.

Laflamme was appointed Minister of Health, Prevention and Seniors in 2026.

As Minister of Health, in November 2026, she reaffirmed the government's intention to abolish Santé Québec. The proposed would retain certain functions of Santé Québec while reducing the centralization of health-system management.

== Electoral record ==
2026 Quebec general election: Chicoutimi
** Preliminary results — Not yet official **
Party	Candidate	Votes	%	±%
Parti Québécois	Marie-Karlynn Laflamme	11,858	39.39	–5.96
Conservative	Gabriella-Myriam Mathieu	5,522	18.34	–7.73
Coalition Avenir Québec	Sandra Larouche	4,956	16.46	+4.49
Liberal	Jean-Marc Allard	4,408	14.64	+5.51
Québec solidaire	Jeanne Palardy	2,965	9.85	+4.26
Climat Québec	Olivier Dion	206	0.68	–0.76
Libertarian	Charles Olivier	191	0.63	N/A
Total valid votes		30,106	98.79	+0.26
Total rejected ballots		370	1.21	–0.26
Turnout		30,476	66.46	+32.24
Electors on the lists		45,858		
Parti Québécois hold		Swing		+0.89
Source: Élections Québec

Quebec provincial by-election, February 23, 2026: Chicoutimi Resignation of Andrée Laforest (September 4, 2025)
Party	Candidate	Votes	%	±%
Parti Québécois	Marie-Karlynn Laflamme	6,999	45.35	+31.14
Conservative	Catherine Morissette	4,023	26.07	+17.64
Coalition Avenir Québec	Francis Tremblay	1,848	11.97	−50.30
Liberal	Tricia Murray	1,409	9.13	+6.09
Québec solidaire	Jeanne Palardy	862	5.59	−6.46
Climat Québec	Olivier Dion	223	1.44	—
Parti populaire	François Sabourin	69	0.45	—
Total valid votes		15,433	98.53	
Total rejected ballots		230	1.47	+0.13
Turnout		15,663	34.22	-34.51
Electors		45,778		
Parti Québécois gain from Coalition Avenir Québec		Swing		+40.72
Source: Élections Québec
