= Émile Simard =

Quebec politician

Émile Simard MNA

Member of the National Assembly for Dubuc
- Incumbent
- Assumed office October 5, 2026
- Preceded by: François Tremblay

Personal details
- Party: Parti Québécois

Émile Simard is a Canadian politician who is a candidate for the National Assembly of Quebec for Dubuc in the 2026 Quebec general election as a member of the Parti Québécois.

Simard was a high school teacher as well as the president of the Parti Québécois National Youth Committee from 2023 to 2025 and the PQ co-spokesperson for student affairs.

== Electoral record ==
2026 Quebec general election: Dubuc
** Preliminary results — Not yet official **
| Party | Candidate | Votes | % | ±% |
|---|---|---|---|---|
| Parti Québécois | Émile Simard | 10,725 | 38.63 | +21.11 |
| Conservative | Catherine Morissette | 7,894 | 28.43 | +17.40 |
| Coalition Avenir Québec | Marc Grandbois | 3,987 | 14.36 | –43.29 |
| Liberal | Virginie Bouchard | 3,151 | 11.35 | +8.87 |
| Québec solidaire | Ève Laguë | 1,804 | 6.50 | –4.09 |
| Présence | Joelle Lavallée | 202 | 0.73 | N/A |
| Total valid votes | | 27,763 | 98.54 | ±0.00 |
| Total rejected ballots | | 411 | 1.46 | ±0.00 |
| Turnout | | 28,174 | 65.27 | +0.22 |
| Electors on the lists | | 43,166 | | |
| Parti Québécois notional gain from Coalition Avenir Québec | | Swing | | +1.86 |
Source: Élections Québec
