= Tremblay, Quebec =

Coordinates: 48°30′N 71°00′W

Tremblay is a geographic township and former township municipality in the Saguenay–Lac-Saint-Jean region of Quebec, Canada.

On February 18, 2002, Tremblay ceased to exist as a jurisdiction. Part of it was incorporated into the new city of Saguenay, Quebec, which merged several jurisdictions. Another part was annexed to Saint-Honoré, Quebec as the Canton-Tremblay district of that municipality.
