= Jean-Marie Claveau =

Canadian politician

MNA for Dubuc
- In office 2012–2014
- Preceded by: Serge Simard
- Succeeded by: Serge Simard

Personal details
- Party: Parti Québécois

Jean-Marie Claveau was a Canadian politician. He was a member of the National Assembly of Quebec for the riding of Dubuc, first elected in the 2012 election. He was defeated in the 2014 election.
