= Luc Boivin =

Canadian politician

His Worship Luc Boivin
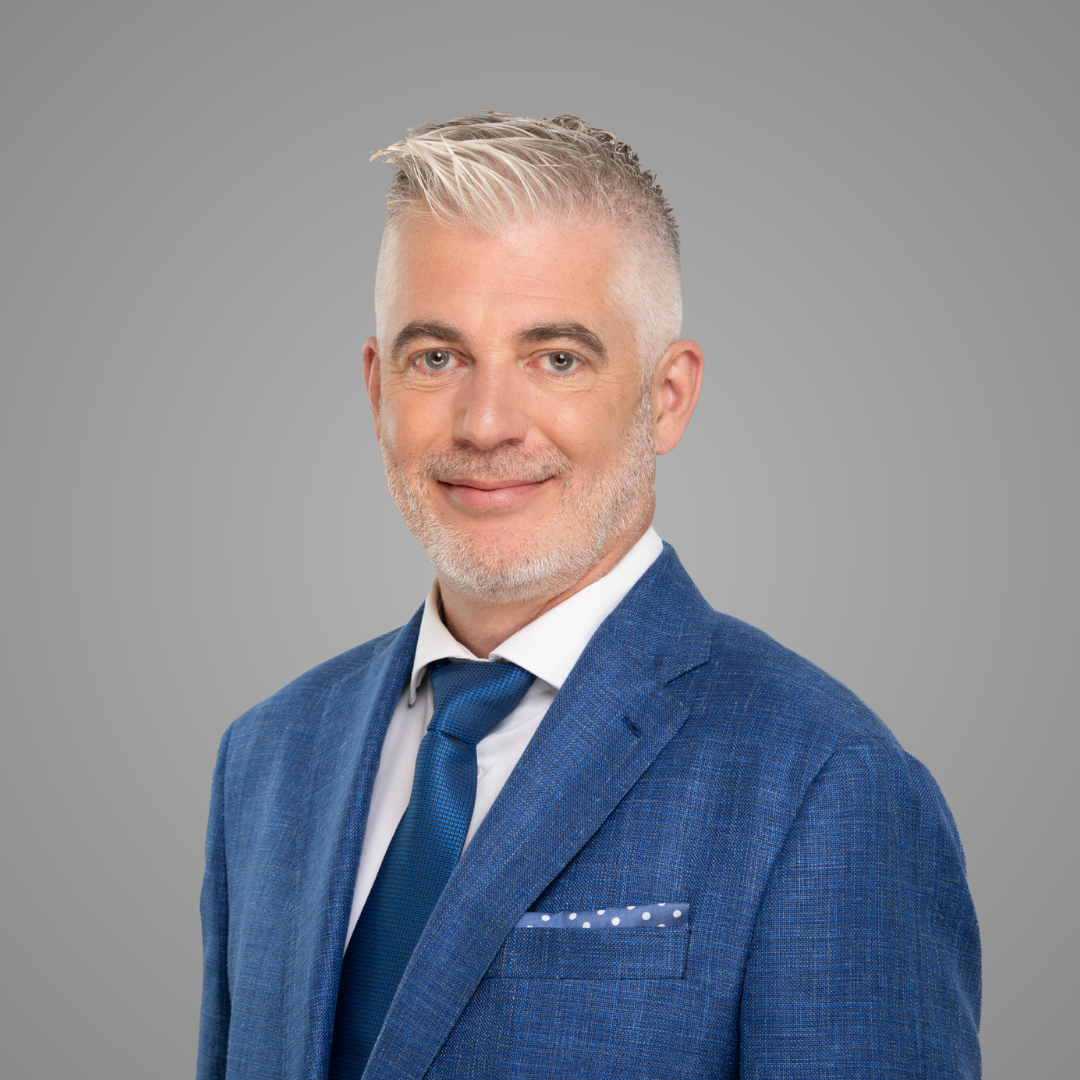

Mayor of Saguenay
- Incumbent
- Assumed office November 18, 2025
- Preceded by: Julie Dufour

Saguenay City Councillor
- In office 2009–2017

Personal details
- Party: Independent

Luc Boivin is a Canadian politician and businessman. He has served as the mayor of Saguenay, Quebec, since 2025. He previously served on the Saguenay City Council from 2009 to 2017, and is the co-owner of Fromagerie Boivin. He ran for mayor in the 2025 Saguenay municipal election, narrowly defeating Andrée Laforest and incumbent mayor Julie Dufour.

== Business career ==
Boivin was the owner of Fromagerie Boivin, a cheese-making company based in Saguenay, Quebec, founded by members of the Boivin family in 1939. He has also served as a director of Promotion Saguenay, an economic development corporation, and of Nature Alu, an aluminum manufacturer, and previously chaired Technologie BiolActis and served as a director of Arianne Phosphate.

== 2025 mayoral election ==
Boivin announced his candidacy for mayor of Saguenay on 18 June 2025 His campaign platform emphasized the city's finances.

In the election held on 2 November 2025, Boivin narrowly defeated former Coalition Avenir Québec cabinet minister Andrée Laforest by a margin of 232 votes out of over 57,000 cast (44.05% to 43.69%),with incumbent mayor Julie Dufour finishing in fourth place with about 2% of the vote after being found guilty of electoral fraud committed in 2021. Counting of the roughly 530 ballot boxes was unusually slow, and a subsequent request for a judicial recount was rejected.

== Mayoralty ==
Boivin was sworn in as mayor of Saguenay on 18 November 2025. As mayor, he chairs the city's executive committee, whose other members include city councillors Jacques Cleary (vice-president), Claude Bouchard, May Gagnon, and Renée Simard; the committee achieved gender parity between its members.
