= Saguenay City Council =

Mayor-council government of Saguenay, Quebec

Saguenay City Council (in French: Conseil municipal de la Ville de Saguenay) is the governing body for the mayor–council government in the city of Saguenay, in the Saguenay–Lac-Saint-Jean region of Quebec.

== Mayor ==
1. Jean Tremblay, Independent (2002–2017)
2. Josée Néron, Équipe du renouveau démocratique (2017–2021)
3. Julie Dufour, Independent (2021–2025)
4. Luc Boivin, Independent (2025–present)

== Councillors ==
As of the 2025 Saguenay municipal election

=== Jonquière Borough ===
District 1: Daniel Tremblay-Larouche

District 2: Claude Bouchard

District 3: Michel Thiffault

District 4: Alain Doré

District 5: Carl Dufour

District 6: Audrey Lapointe

=== Chicoutimi Borough ===
District 7: Serge Gaudreault

District 8: Cathy Fortin

District 9: Michel Tremblay

District 10: Jacques Cleary

District 11: Joan Simard

District 12: May Gagnon

=== La Baie Borough ===
District 13: Raynald Simard

District 14: Renée Simard

District 15: François Fortin
