= Josée Néron =

Canadian politician

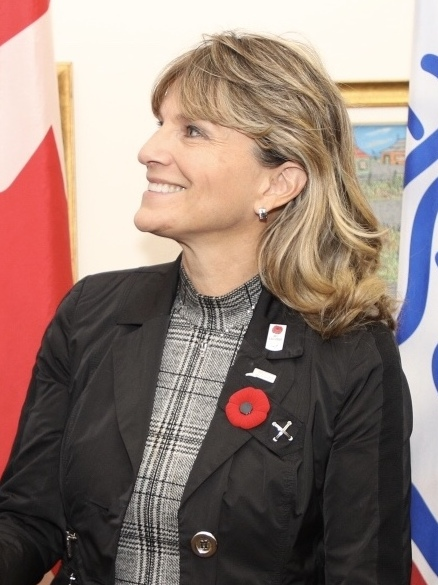

Mayor of Saguenay, Quebec
- In office November 16, 2017 – November 15, 2021
- Preceded by: Jean Tremblay
- Succeeded by: Julie Dufour

Personal details
- Party: Équipe du renouveau démocratique

Josée Néron is a Canadian politician, who was elected mayor of Saguenay, Quebec in the 2017 municipal election. She is the second mayor, and the first female mayor, of the city since the municipal amalgamation in 2002.

Prior to her election as mayor, Néron served on Saguenay City Council.
