= Andrée Laforest =

Canadian politician

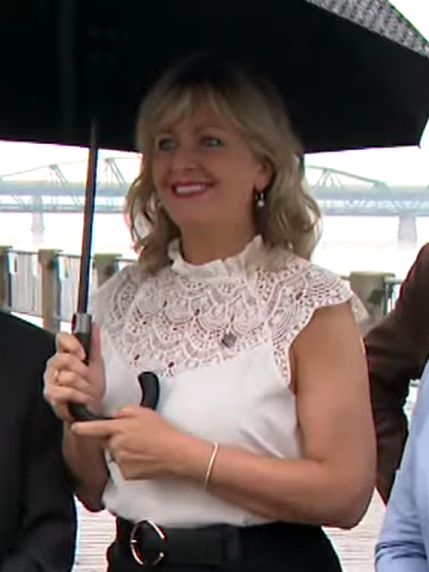
- Laforest in 2023

Member of the National Assembly of Quebec for Chicoutimi
- In office October 1, 2018 – September 4, 2025
- Preceded by: Mireille Jean
- Succeeded by: Marie-Karlynn Laflamme

Quebec Minister of Municipal Affairs
- In office October 20, 2022 – September 4, 2025
- Preceded by: Martin Coiteux
- Succeeded by: Geneviève Guilbault

Quebec Minister of Municipal Affairs and Housing
- In office October 18, 2018 – October 20, 2022
- Preceded by: Martin Coiteux (As Minister of Municipal Affairs); Lise Thériault (As Minister of Housing)
- Succeeded by: France-Élaine Duranceau (As Minister of Housing)

Personal details
- Party: Coalition Avenir Québec

Andrée Laforest (French pronunciation: [ɑ̃dʁe lafɔʁɛ]) is a Canadian politician who was elected to the National Assembly of Quebec in the 2018 provincial election. She represents the electoral district of Chicoutimi as a member of the Coalition Avenir Québec. She was re-elected in 2022 election following the landslide victory of Coalition Avenir Quebec.

She was named Minister of Municipal Affairs and Housing in the François Legault Government of the 42nd legislature of Quebec. In the 43rd legislature of Quebec, she was named Minister of Municipal Affairs. She resigned from the National Assembly to run for mayor in the 2025 Saguenay municipal election, narrowly losing to Luc Boivin.

In 2026, she declined a Liberal Party of Canada nomination to run in a federal by-election for Chicoutimi—Le Fjord in the House of Commons of Canada.

== Electoral record ==
2022 Quebec general election: Chicoutimi
Party	Candidate	Votes	%	±%
Coalition Avenir Québec	Andrée Laforest	19,345	62.28	+23.02
Parti Québécois	Alice Villeneuve	4,415	14.21	–10.75
Québec solidaire	Adrien Guibert-Barthez	3,741	12.04	–0.84
Conservative	Éric Girard	2,619	8.43	+7.05
Liberal	Gabriel Caron	943	3.04	–16.70
Total valid votes		31,063	98.66	
Total rejected ballots		421	1.34	–0.57
Turnout		31,484	68.73	+0.20
Electors on the lists		45,810		
Coalition Avenir Québec hold		Swing		+16.88
Source: Élections Québec

2018 Quebec general election: Chicoutimi
Party	Candidate	Votes	%	±%
Coalition Avenir Québec	Andrée Laforest	12,123	39.26	+27.57
Parti Québécois	Mireille Jean	7,707	24.96	-21.76
Liberal	Marie-Josée Morency	6,094	19.74	-10.49
Québec solidaire	Pierre Dostie	3,977	12.88	+4.88
Green	Tommy Philippe	551	1.78	-0.68
Conservative	Léonard Gagnon	426	1.38	–
Total valid votes		30,878	98.09	
Total rejected ballots		601	1.91	+0.32
Turnout		31,479	68.53	+27.43
Eligible voters		45,937		
Coalition Avenir Québec gain from Parti Québécois		Swing		+24.66
Source(s) "Résultats des élections générales du 1er octobre 2018". Élections Québec.

Quebec provincial government of François Legault
Cabinet post (1)
Predecessor	Office	Successor
Martin Coiteux (Municipal Affairs); Lise Thériault (Housing)	Minister of Municipal Affairs and Housing; October 18, 2018–October 20, 2022	France-Élaine Duranceau
