= Université du Québec à Chicoutimi =

Canadian University

Coordinates: 48°25′12″N 71°03′09″W

University of Quebec in Chicoutimi
- Université du Québec à Chicoutimi
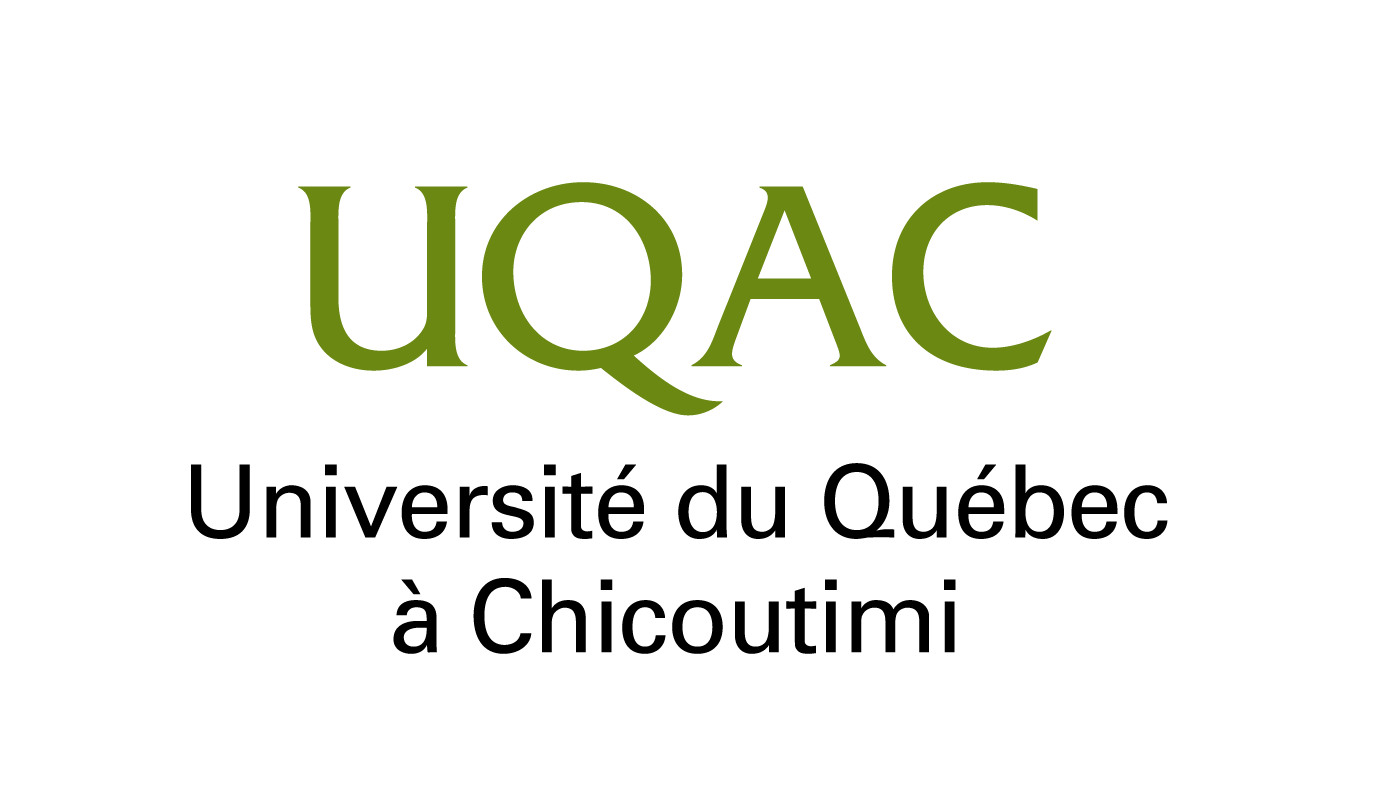
- Motto: Libre de voir plus loin
- Motto in English: Free to see further
- Type: Branch of the Université du Québec
- Established: 1959 Université au Saguenay-Lac-Saint-Jean (1959-1967). Subsequently renamed, Université du Québec à Chicoutimi (1969-present)
- Affiliations: AUCC, IAU, AUFC, CIS
- Principal: Ghislain Bourque
- Academic staff: 209
- Location: 555, boulevard de l'Université; Saguenay, Quebec; G7H 2B1
- Campus: Urban
Colours
Green and Black
- Website: www.uqac.ca

The Université du Québec à Chicoutimi (French pronunciation: [ynivɛʁsite dy kebɛk a ʃikutimi], University of Quebec in Chicoutimi, UQAC), is a branch of the Université du Québec network founded in 1969 and based in the Chicoutimi borough of Saguenay, Quebec, Canada. UQAC has secondary study centres in La Malbaie, Saint-Félicien, Alma, and Sept-Îles. In 2017, 7500 students were registered and 209 professors worked for the university, making it the fourth largest of the ten Université du Québec branches, after Université du Québec à Montréal (UQAM), Université du Québec à Trois-Rivières (UQTR), and École de technologie supérieure (ETS).

== Academics ==
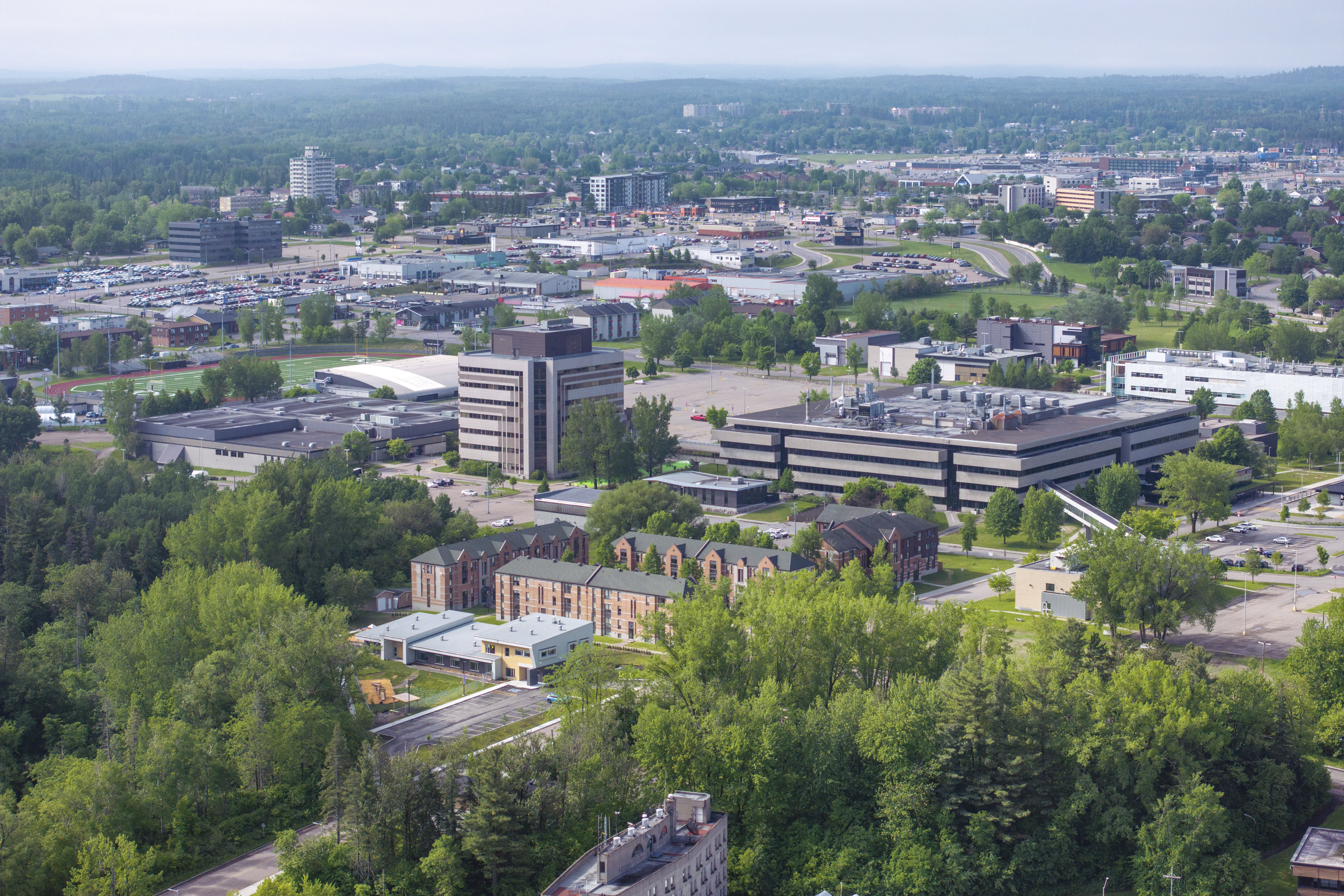
Université du Québec à Chicoutimi.

It offers over forty undergraduate and graduate programs. The university is especially well known for its researchers in aluminium (with two research centres), forestry, icing (in French, givrage), geology and historical population studies.

In 2005, UQAC opened programs for students from foreign countries in partnership with universities from Morocco, Lebanon, China, Senegal, Colombia, and Brazil.

In 2006, Université de Sherbrooke opened a building of its medical school on UQAC's campus, allowing its students to register at UQAC for other courses, such as biology.

Engineering students can choose to specialize in the following disciplines: Computer Engineering, Geological Engineering and Génie unifié

UQAC also offers a number of French as a Second Language programs through its École de langue française et de culture québécoise (School of French language and Quebec culture)

In 2008, the School of Digital Arts, Animation and Design (commonly referred to as NAD) located in Montreal was merged with UQAC.

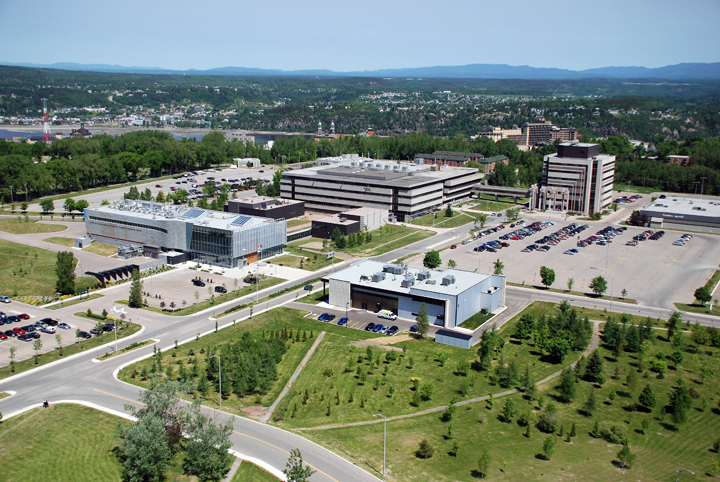
Université du Québec à Chicoutimi

== Notable faculty ==
- Sarah-Jane Barnes
- Gérard Bouchard
- André Francoeur
- Marie-Karlynn Laflamme
- Claude Villeneuve

== Honoris Causa ==
UQAC has granted 23 honoris causa doctorates during its existence.

- Mgr Victor Tremblay (1977)
- Mgr Félix-Antoine Savard (1979)
- Paul-Gaston Tremblay (1980)
- Jacques Gagnon (posthumous, 1980)
- Father Pierre-Paul Asselin (1981)
- Jean-Paul Desbiens (1983)
- François Brassard (posthumus, 1984)
- Sister Imelda Dallaire (1984)
- Father Georges-Henri Lévesque (1985)
- Bernard Lamarre (1987)
- Dr. Albert Jacquard (1987)
- François Sénécal-Tremblay (1989)
- Judge Pierre Bergeron (1992)
- Jean-Marie Couët (1992)
- Gérard Arguin (1994)
- Carroll L'Italien (2001)
- Michel Dumont (2001)
- Gaston L. Tremblay (2004)
- André Imbeau (2005)
- Lucien Bouchard (2007)
- Boutros Boutros-Ghali (2007)
- Pierre Lavoie (2010)
- Félix Blackburn (2013)
