= Saguenay, Quebec =

City in the province of Québec, Canada

Saguenay
- City
- Ville de Saguenay
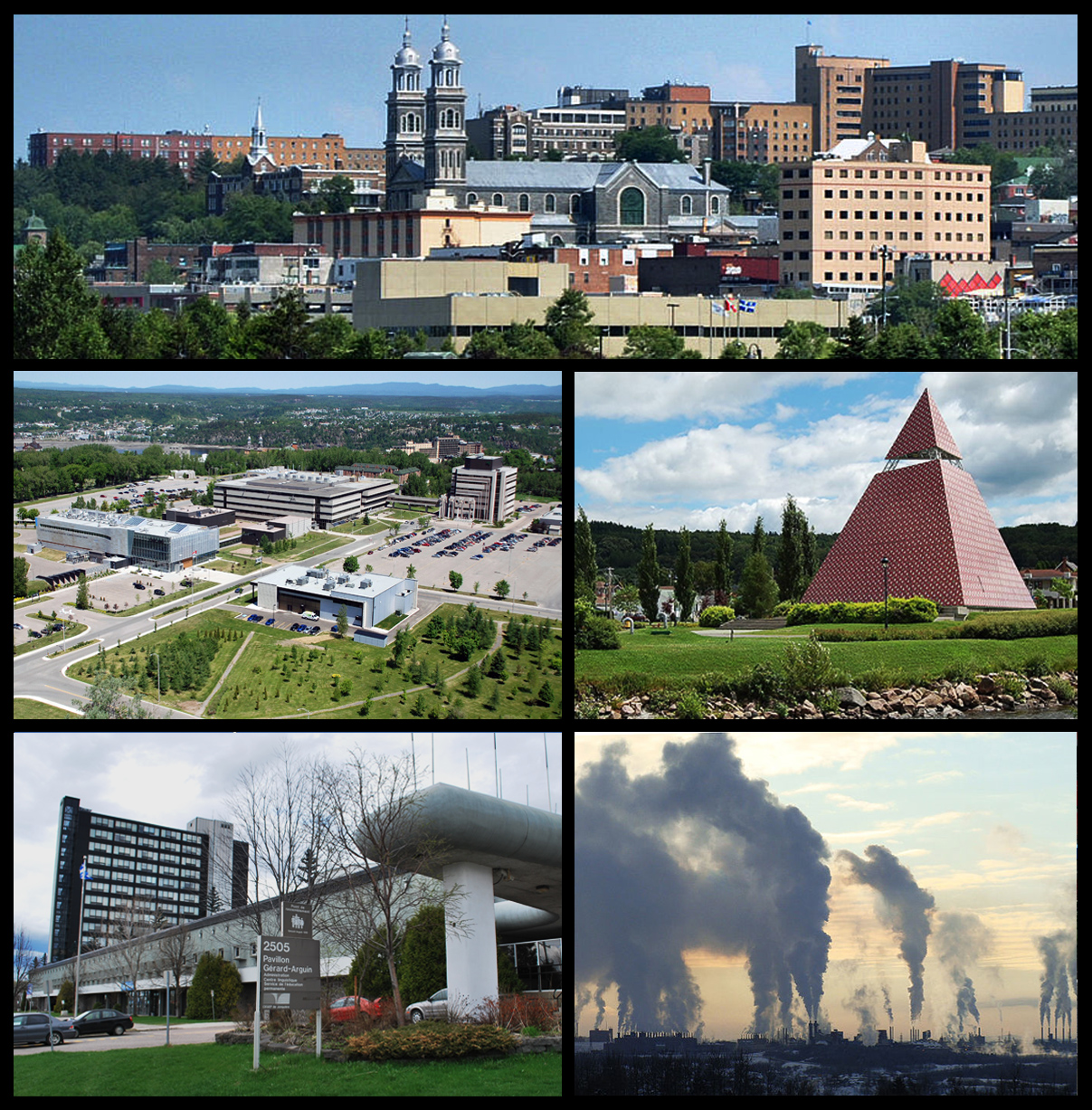
- From top, left to right: Downtown Chicoutimi borough, the UQAC, the Ha! Ha! Pyramid, the Cégep de Jonquière, and Rio Tinto's aluminium smelters in Arvida

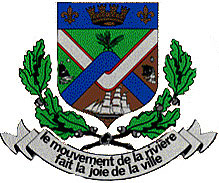
- Flag Coat of arms

- Location of Saguenay in Quebec
- Coordinates: 48°25′N 71°04′W
- Country: Canada
- Province: Quebec
- Region: Saguenay–Lac-Saint-Jean
- RCM: None
- Settled: 1840s
- Constituted: February 18, 2002
- Boroughs: List: Chicoutimi; Jonquière; La Baie

Government
  - Type: Saguenay City Council
  - Mayor: Luc Boivin
  - Federal riding: Chicoutimi—Le Fjord and Jonquière—Hébertville—Pays-des-Bleuets
  - Prov. riding: Chicoutimi, Dubuc and Jonquière

Area
  - City: 1,279.70 km^{2} (494.09 sq mi)
  - Land: 1,124.63 km^{2} (434.22 sq mi)
  - Urban: 107.67 km^{2} (41.57 sq mi)
  - Metro: 3,133.53 km^{2} (1,209.86 sq mi)
- Elevation: 166 m (545 ft)

Population (2021)
  - City: 148,886
  - Rank: 8th in Quebec
  - Density: 128.7/km^{2} (333/sq mi)
  - Urban: 117,284
  - Urban density: 1,089.3/km^{2} (2,821/sq mi)
  - Metro: 170,380
  - Metro density: 51.6/km^{2} (134/sq mi)
  - Pop (2016–21): ▼0.8%
  - Dwellings: 71,017
- Time zone: UTC−5 (EST)
  - Summer (DST): UTC−4 (EDT)
- Postal code(s): G7 (B, G-H, J-K, N, S-T, X-Z), G8A
- Area codes: 418 and 581
- GDP (Saguenay CMA): CA$6.7 billion (2016)
- GDP per capita (Saguenay CMA): CA$41,639 (2016)
- Website: ville.saguenay.ca

Saguenay (/ˈsæɡəneɪ, ˌsæɡəˈneɪ/ SAG-ə-nay, -NAY, French: [saɡne]) is a city in the Saguenay–Lac-Saint-Jean region of Quebec, Canada, on the Saguenay River, about 200 kilometres (120 mi) north of Quebec City by overland route. It is about 126 kilometres (78 mi) upriver and northwest of Tadoussac, located at the confluence with the St. Lawrence River. It was formed in 2002 by merging the cities of Chicoutimi and Jonquière and the town of La Baie. Chicoutimi was founded by the French as a fur trading post in 1676. As of July 2021, the city had a population of 148,000 and the metropolitan area had a population of 170,000.

The city of Saguenay constitutes a territory equivalent to a regional county municipality (TE); its geographical code is 941. Together with the regional county municipality of Le Fjord-du-Saguenay, it forms the census division (CD) of Le Saguenay-et-son-Fjord (94). The mayor of Saguenay since 2025 is Luc Boivin. Prior to its use as the name of the city, the term "the Saguenay" or (less commonly) "Saguenay Valley" had already been used for the entire Saguenay River region (see Saguenay–Lac-Saint-Jean). Saguenay is the seat of the judicial district of Chicoutimi.

The city is divided into three boroughs: Chicoutimi (which includes the former city of Chicoutimi, as well as Laterrière and Tremblay township), Jonquière (which includes the former city of Jonquière, Lac-Kénogami, and Shipshaw) and La Baie (which corresponds to the former city of La Baie).

The name Saguenay is possibly derived from the Innu word "Saki-nip", which means "where water flows out".

== History ==
Saguenay was formed on February 18, 2002, by amalgamating the cities of Chicoutimi, Jonquière, La Baie and Laterrière, along with the municipalities of Lac-Kénogami and Shipshaw and part of the township of Tremblay.

=== Chicoutimi ===
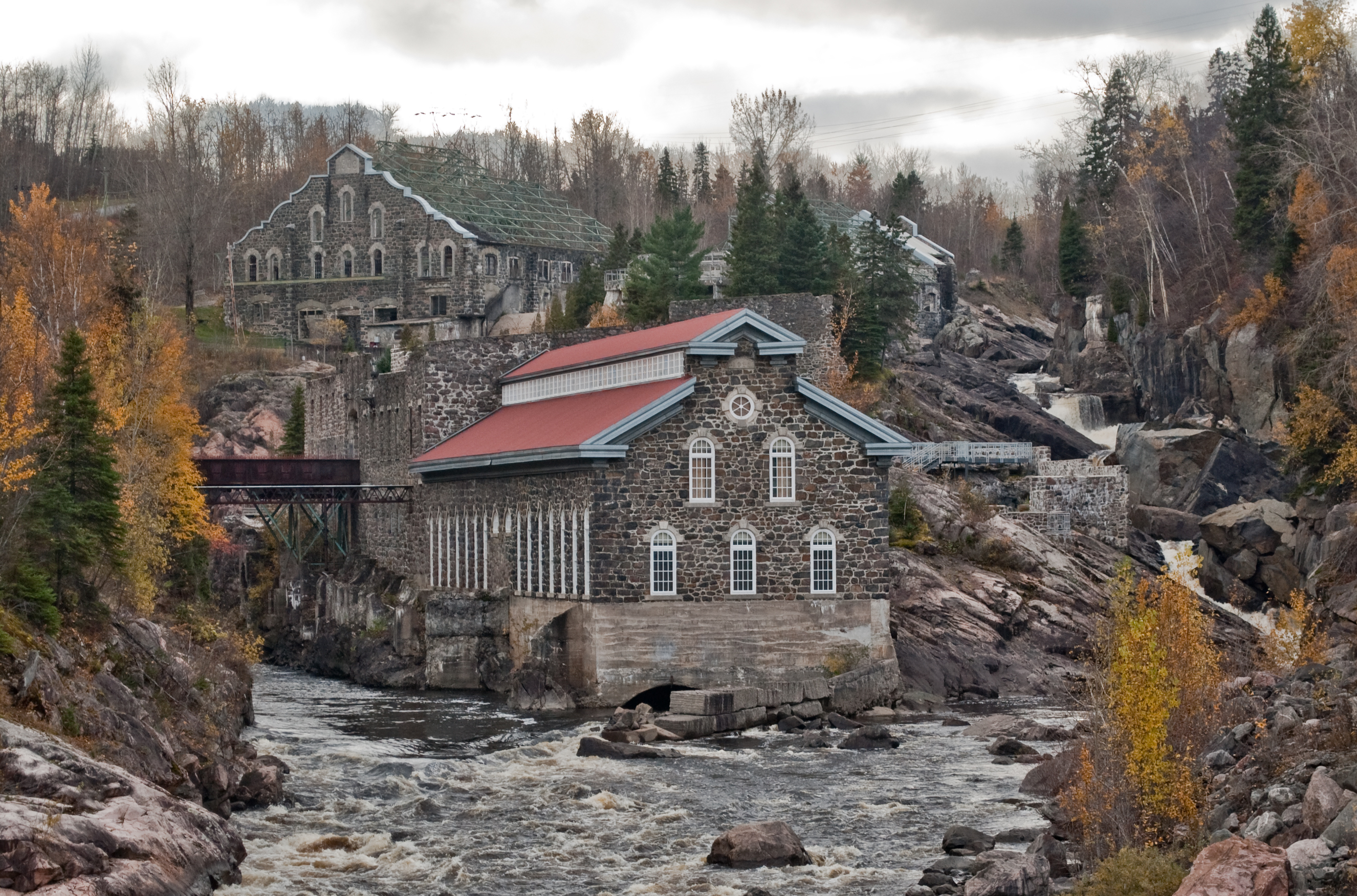
Old Chicoutimi Pulp Mill was an early 20th-century industrial complex in operation from 1898 to 1930.

First Nations people, including Innus have inhabited the Saguenay Fjord area for thousands of years prior to the first Europeans arriving. What was ultimately to become the centre of the borough of Chicoutimi was first settled in 1676 as a French trading post in the fur trade. At that time, the Saguenay and Chicoutimi rivers had been used for centuries by the Innu. The name Chicoutimi means 'the end of the deepwater' in the Montagnais. Chicoutimi trading post was in operation until 1782.

The city of Chicoutimi was officially incorporated as a municipality in 1845 by Peter McLeod, a Métis timber contractor, who had built a sawmill there in 1842. It was designated in 1855 as the seat of Chicoutimi County and in 1878 as the seat of the Roman Catholic Diocese of Chicoutimi.

With the arrival of the Canadian National Railway in 1893, the local pulp and paper industries expanded, particularly in mechanical pulp production. The Chicoutimi Pulp Co. was founded in 1896 and backed by French-Canadian investors. By 1910 the Chicoutimi Pulp Mill became the biggest producer of mechanical pulp in Canada.

The economic decline of the Great Depression led the city's economy to shift administration and commerce and commercial. The Conservatoire de musique de Saguenay was founded in Chicoutimi in 1967, and the Université du Québec à Chicoutimi was founded in 1969. The city played host to the Quebec Summer Games in 1972.

In the municipal amalgamations of 1976, Chicoutimi annexed the neighbouring towns of Chicoutimi-Nord and Rivière-du-Moulin. In a later round of amalgamations in 2002, the cities of Chicoutimi, Jonquière, La Baie, Lac-Kénogami, Laterrière, Shipshaw and part of Tremblay merged to form the new city of Saguenay. Chicoutimi became a borough of Saguenay.

During the summer of 1996 a record rainfall in the region caused major flooding in the downtown, as well as outlying areas. The total cost of the disaster was recorded to be C$1.5 billion. It claimed seven lives and destroyed many bridges.

=== Jonquière ===
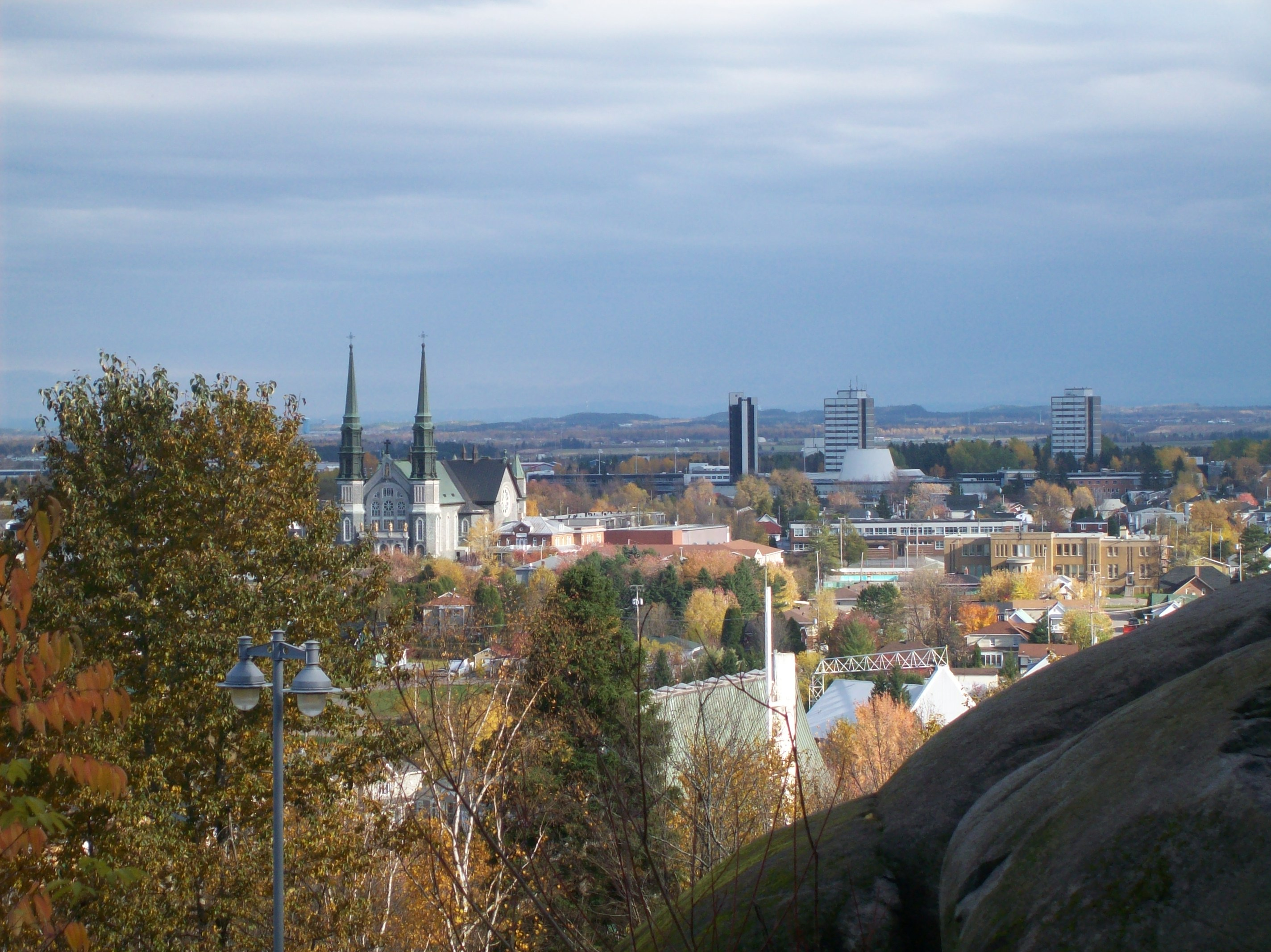
A view of Jonquiere as seen from Mont Jacob

Jonquière was founded in 1847 by Marguerite Belley, who came from La Malbaie to settle on the Rivière aux Sables. It was named after Jacques-Pierre de Taffanel de la Jonquière, Marquis de la Jonquière, governor of New France from 1749 to 1752.

Growth came from the construction of pulp and paper mills at the beginning of the 20th century. Between 1925 and 1928, the world's largest aluminum plant was built along with the city Arvida (then a separate town). In 1942, to supply power to the plant, Alcan built a hydroelectric station at Shipshaw that was the largest in the world at that time. Jonquière, Arvida, and Kénogami were amalgamated into a single city, Jonquière, in 1975. Jonquière was the host city for the Quebec Games in the winter of 1976, and for the Canoe/Kayak World Championships in slalom and whitewater racing, in 1979.

Much of Jonquière's development owed its strength to the Price family, who ran a pulp and paper factory in Kénogami. Today that factory is owned by Produits Forestiers Résolu. Arvida is the home of an aluminium plant owned by Rio Tinto Alcan.

When the city of Saguenay was constituted on February 18, 2002, by municipal amalgamation, the borough of Jonquière was created from the former city of Jonquière, the former municipality of Shipshaw, and the former municipality of Lac-Kénogami. The former city of Jonquière had a population of 54,842 in the Canada 2001 Census, the last census in which Jonquière was counted as a separate city.

The Rivière aux Sables runs through the centre of Jonquière. Significant damage to the city's buildings was caused by the 1996 Saguenay flood.

== Geography ==
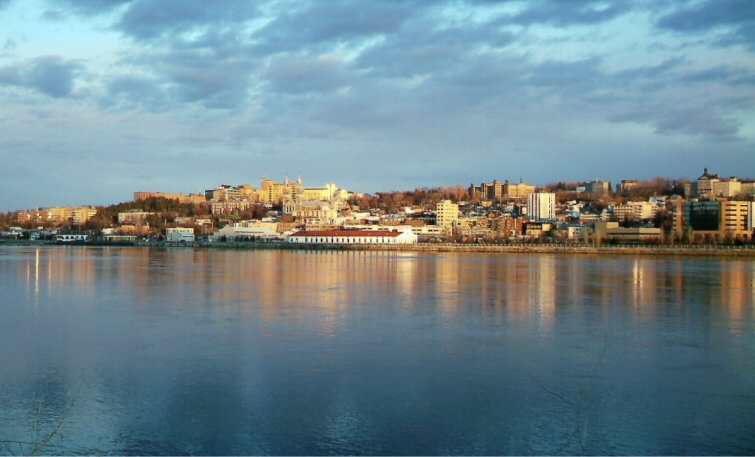
Chicoutimi as seen from the bank of the Saguenay River

Saguenay is located in a depression in the Canadian Shield called the Saguenay Graben, which has a somewhat more temperate climate than the surrounding region. This has encouraged agriculture and human settlement to take place. The relatively small and concentrated Lac St-Jean area where the city is located can be described as an isolated "oasis" in the middle of the vast remote wilderness of Northern Quebec. No paved roads go north from the area into the wilderness; the last paved roads to the north end just a short distance from the city, and still within the Lac St-Jean area. There are no human settlements due north of Saguenay all the way to the Canadian Arctic islands, except for a few isolated Cree and Inuit villages. Few roads connect with the area from the south and east. However, the remote, paved Route 167/113 heads northwest to the interior town of Chibougamau, providing access to Western Quebec and Hudson Bay. No services are available for the 230 km (140 mi) to Chibougamau from the Lac St-Jean area.

Two notable natural disasters have occurred within the current municipal boundaries of Saguenay: the Saint-Jean-Vianney landslide of May 4, 1971, and the Saguenay flood of 1996. The 1988 Saguenay earthquake, a magnitude 5.9 earthquake on November 25, 1988, had its epicenter 35 km south of Chicoutimi and was felt within the city.

=== Climate ===
Saguenay has a humid continental climate (Köppen Climate Classification Dfb) with large variation between summer and winter. The city features two brief transition seasons (spring and autumn), while summers are warm and occasionally hot, and winters are long and very cold. Temperatures drop below −20.0 °C (−4 °F) on average 43 times per year and below −30.0 °C (−22 °F) 6 times per year. The low winter temperatures characteristic of Saguenay are caused by a combination of factors, such as the cold waters of the Labrador Current and Hudson Bay to the north and east of the city.

The highest temperature ever recorded in Saguenay was 39.4 °C (103 °F) on August 18, 1935. The coldest temperature ever recorded was −45.0 °C (−49 °F) on February 5, 1916.

Climate data for CFB Bagotville, 1991–2020 normals, extremes 1880–present (Note: Extreme high and low temperatures were recorded at nearby Chicoutimi beginning in November 1880 and at CFB Bagotville from September 1942 to present.)
Month	Jan	Feb	Mar	Apr	May	Jun	Jul	Aug	Sep	Oct	Nov	Dec	Year
Record high humidex	14.7	13.4	28.6	31.0	40.6	43.2	45.5	43.2	40.8	30.7	25.5	13.3	45.5
Record high °C (°F)	15.2 (59.4)	13.6 (56.5)	25.2 (77.4)	30.4 (86.7)	34.4 (93.9)	36.3 (97.3)	38.4 (101.1)	39.4 (102.9)	33.3 (91.9)	31.7 (89.1)	23.6 (74.5)	14.4 (57.9)	39.4 (102.9)
Mean maximum °C (°F)	4.2 (39.6)	4.2 (39.6)	10.5 (50.9)	19.3 (66.7)	28.1 (82.6)	32.0 (89.6)	32.0 (89.6)	31.2 (88.2)	27.6 (81.7)	21.2 (70.2)	14.3 (57.7)	6.4 (43.5)	33.8 (92.8)
Mean daily maximum °C (°F)	−9.7 (14.5)	−7.4 (18.7)	−0.7 (30.7)	7.4 (45.3)	16.6 (61.9)	22.3 (72.1)	24.5 (76.1)	23.4 (74.1)	18.2 (64.8)	9.9 (49.8)	2.3 (36.1)	−5.1 (22.8)	8.5 (47.3)
Daily mean °C (°F)	−15.1 (4.8)	−13.1 (8.4)	−6.3 (20.7)	2.1 (35.8)	10.2 (50.4)	16.0 (60.8)	18.7 (65.7)	17.6 (63.7)	12.6 (54.7)	5.7 (42.3)	−1.5 (29.3)	−9.5 (14.9)	3.1 (37.6)
Mean daily minimum °C (°F)	−20.4 (−4.7)	−18.7 (−1.7)	−11.8 (10.8)	−3.2 (26.2)	3.7 (38.7)	9.6 (49.3)	12.9 (55.2)	11.8 (53.2)	6.9 (44.4)	1.4 (34.5)	−5.4 (22.3)	−13.9 (7.0)	−2.3 (27.9)
Mean minimum °C (°F)	−32.6 (−26.7)	−30.4 (−22.7)	−25.2 (−13.4)	−11.9 (10.6)	−3.3 (26.1)	2.2 (36.0)	6.8 (44.2)	5.0 (41.0)	−0.9 (30.4)	−6.0 (21.2)	−16.4 (2.5)	−27.0 (−16.6)	−33.4 (−28.1)
Record low °C (°F)	−43.9 (−47.0)	−45.0 (−49.0)	−40.0 (−40.0)	−24.4 (−11.9)	−16.1 (3.0)	−4.4 (24.1)	0.0 (32.0)	−4.4 (24.1)	−7.2 (19.0)	−17.8 (0.0)	−31.1 (−24.0)	−42.8 (−45.0)	−45.0 (−49.0)
Record low wind chill	−50.8	−46.2	−49.8	−34.3	−11.4	−3.7	0.0	0.0	−8.1	−15.4	−28.8	−50.3	−50.8
Average precipitation mm (inches)	57.8 (2.28)	48.3 (1.90)	57.7 (2.27)	61.4 (2.42)	77.7 (3.06)	88.9 (3.50)	112.1 (4.41)	100.0 (3.94)	101.6 (4.00)	91.9 (3.62)	66.0 (2.60)	64.4 (2.54)	927.7 (36.52)
Average rainfall mm (inches)	6.9 (0.27)	4.9 (0.19)	15.2 (0.60)	39.4 (1.55)	74.5 (2.93)	88.9 (3.50)	112.1 (4.41)	100.0 (3.94)	101.6 (4.00)	84.4 (3.32)	32.5 (1.28)	12.5 (0.49)	672.7 (26.48)
Average snowfall cm (inches)	61.8 (24.3)	52.3 (20.6)	48.7 (19.2)	23.3 (9.2)	3.4 (1.3)	0.0 (0.0)	0.0 (0.0)	0.0 (0.0)	0.0 (0.0)	7.6 (3.0)	39.4 (15.5)	65.1 (25.6)	301.7 (118.8)
Average precipitation days (≥ 0.2 mm)	19.0	15.5	15.2	14.6	15.2	14.7	16.7	16.3	15.1	17.5	18.2	20.0	198.0
Average rainy days (≥ 0.2 mm)	2.0	1.5	3.9	10.0	14.9	14.7	16.7	16.3	15.1	15.9	8.3	3.2	122.5
Average snowy days (≥ 0.2 cm)	18.7	15.2	13.4	7.7	0.9	0.0	0.0	0.0	0.0	3.2	12.7	19.2	90.9
Average dew point °C (°F)	−17.6 (0.3)	−15.9 (3.4)	−10.2 (13.6)	−4.0 (24.8)	2.5 (36.5)	8.9 (48.0)	12.8 (55.0)	12.3 (54.1)	8.2 (46.8)	1.8 (35.2)	−4.3 (24.3)	−11.7 (10.9)	−1.4 (29.5)
Source 1: Environment Canada
Source 2: weatherstats.ca (for dewpoint and monthly&yearly average absolute maximum&minimum temperature)

== Demographics ==
Saguenay
Year	Pop.	±%
2006	143,692	—
2011	144,746	+0.7%
2016	145,949	+0.8%
2021	144,723	−0.8%
Statistics Canada

In the 2021 Census of Population conducted by Statistics Canada, Saguenay had a population of 144,723 living in 67,522 of its 71,017 total private dwellings, a change of −0.8% from its 2016 population of 145,949. With a land area of 1,124.63 km^{2} (434.22 sq mi), it had a population density of 128.7/km^{2} (333.3/sq mi) in 2021.

At the census metropolitan area (CMA) level in the 2021 census, the Saguenay CMA had a population of 161,567 living in 74,809 of its 79,976 total private dwellings, a change of 0.0% from its 2016 population of 161,520. With a land area of 3,133.53 km^{2} (1,209.86 sq mi), it had a population density of 51.6/km^{2} (134/mi^{2}) in 2021.

The ville of Saguenay had a 2021 population of 144,723. The median age is 46.0, as opposed to 41.6 for all of Canada.

The area is home to 420 recent immigrants (i.e. those arriving between 2016 and 2021), who comprise about 0.3% of the total population. 145 of them come from France, and 140 come from various African countries, with Cameroon leading at 40 recent immigrants.

=== Ethnicity ===
As of 2021, Indigenous peoples comprised 5.4% of the population and visible minorities contributed 2.0%.

The largest visible minority groups in Saguenay are Black (0.9%), Arab (0.3%), and Latin American (0.3%). Counting both single and multiple responses, the most commonly identified ethnocultural ancestries were:

Ethnic origin	2021
Canadian	41.3%
French	19.9%
Québécois	15.7%
French Canadian	11.6%
First Nations	3.0%
Irish	2.4%
Scottish	1.6%
Métis	1.5%
Acadian	1.2%
Innu	1.0%

Panethnic groups in the City of Saguenay (2001−2021)
Panethnic group	2021		2016		2011		2006	
Panethnic group	Pop.	%	Pop.	%	Pop.	%	Pop.	%
European (Note: Statistic includes all persons that did not make up part of a visible minority or an indigenous identity.)	132,880	94.16%	134,405	94.5%	136,520	96.6%	138,195	97.54%
Indigenous	5,370	3.81%	5,860	4.12%	3,550	2.51%	2,215	1.56%
African	1,310	0.93%	650	0.46%	385	0.27%	330	0.23%
Middle Eastern (Note: Statistic includes total responses of "West Asian" and "Arab" under visible minority section on census.)	460	0.33%	395	0.28%	230	0.16%	180	0.13%
Latin American	415	0.29%	225	0.16%	190	0.13%	280	0.2%
East Asian (Note: Statistic includes total responses of "Chinese", "Korean", and "Japanese" under visible minority section on census.)	260	0.26%	305	0.21%	260	0.18%	310	0.22%
Southeast Asian (Note: Statistic includes total responses of "Filipino" and "Southeast Asian" under visible minority section on census.)	180	0.13%	205	0.14%	80	0.06%	105	0.07%
South Asian	120	0.09%	120	0.08%	35	0.02%	40	0.03%
Other (Note: Statistic includes total responses of "Visible minority, n.i.e." and "Multiple visible minorities" under visible minority section on census.)	130	0.09%	70	0.05%	30	0.02%	0	0%
Total responses	141,120	97.51%	142,225	97.45%	141,330	97.64%	141,680	98.6%
Total population	144,723	100%	145,949	100%	144,746	100%	143,692	100%

- Note: Totals greater than 100% due to multiple origin responses.

=== Language ===
French was the mother tongue of 97.4% of residents in 2021. The next most common mother tongues were English at 0.8%, followed by Spanish at 0.4%. 0.4% reported both English and French as their first language. Additionally there were 0.2% who reported both French and a non-official language as their mother tongue.

=== Religion ===
In 2021, 71.5% of the population identified as Catholic, a 20.0% decrease from 2011, while 21.1% said they had no religious affiliation. Muslims were the largest religious minority, making up 0.5% of the population.

== Economy ==
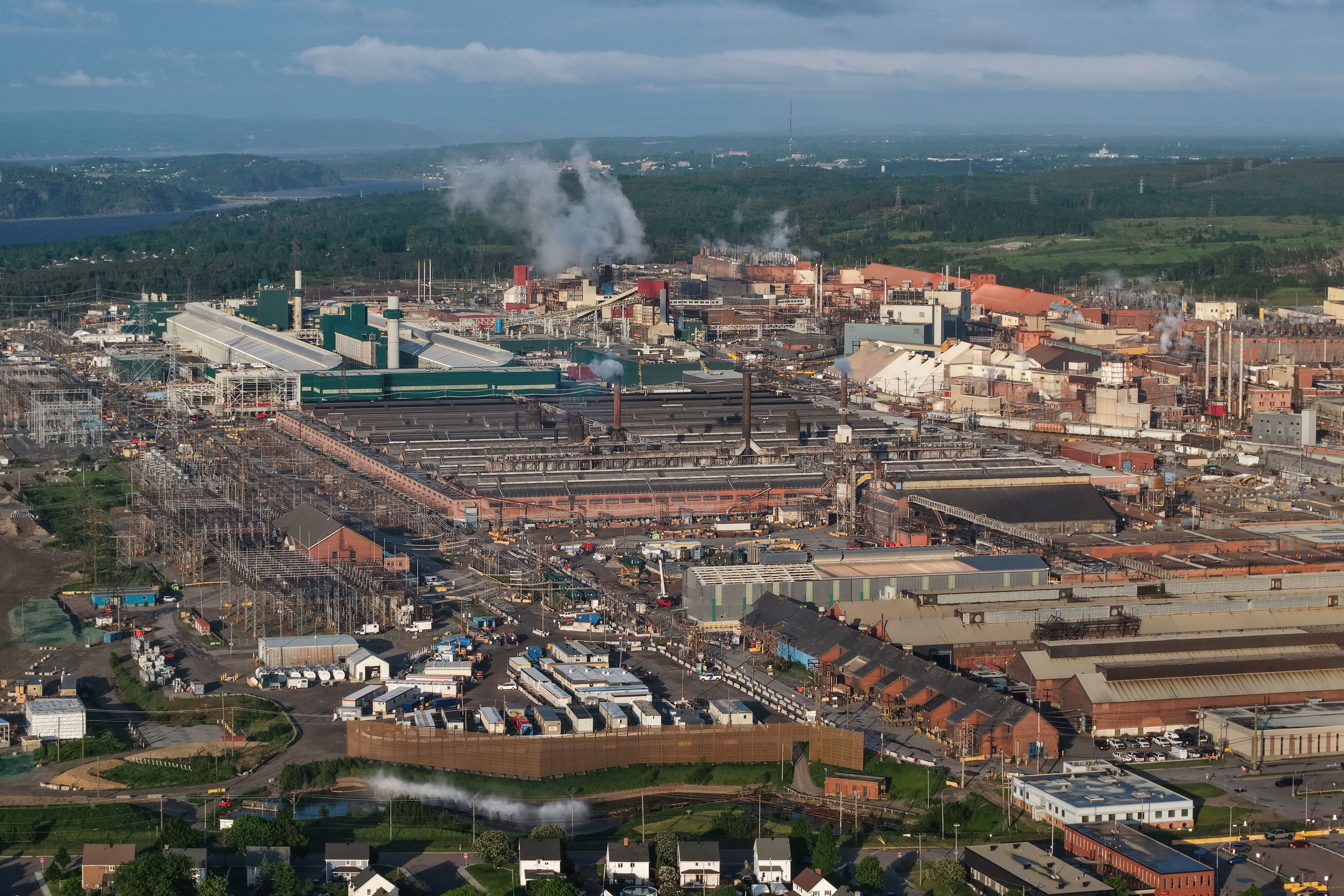
Aerial view of Rio Tinto Alcan's aluminum complex

Saguenay's economy is in transition. It is increasingly based on developing research and teaching in applied technologies for energy, aluminum, boreal forest, genomics and biomedical sciences.

Saguenay has three large industrial parks totaling 8,496,138 square metres (91,451,670 sq ft) of commercial facilities: five city centres and shopping centres, six shopping centres, power centres, and five major commercial arteries.

Saguenay, in the borough of La Baie, opened a pier in 2006 followed by the Bagotville wharf cruise terminal in 2009, in order to accommodate some of the larger cruise ships such as Eurodam and Queen Mary 2. At least 200 cruise ships have visited La Baie, including 54 ships and over 50,000 passengers in 2017.

In addition, Rio Tinto Alcan confirmed in December 2010 investment of 750 million dollars to upgrade its pilot plant in Jonquière AP-60. The plant was estimated to be 40% more productive than the existing aluminum plant. The first phase included 38 tanks equipped with new technology, with an estimated production of 60,000 tons of aluminum per year. The first ingots were cast in the first quarter of 2013.

According to 2010 data from the Institute of Statistics of Québec (ISQ), the per capita personal income in 2009 amounted to $31,677 versus $31,344 in 2008, a variation of 1.1%. On the other hand, the GDP of the Saguenay CMA in 2009 totaled $6 billion compared to the $9.1 billion GDP of Saguenay-Lac-St-Jean.

Cobalt Aircraft operates a manufacturing plant in the city. On January 17, 2011, the company chose Saguenay for the assembly plant of the aircraft Co50, an advanced, high-end propeller plane.

== Arts and culture ==
Cultural events in the Saguenay region include the Saguenay International Short Film Festival (French: Regard sur le court métrage au Saguenay).

== Sports ==
The city has been home to the QMJHL's Chicoutimi Saguenéens since 1973. They play at the Centre Georges-Vézina in the borough of Chicoutimi.
In 2008, the LNAH professional team Saint-Jean-sur-Richelieu Summun-Chiefs moved to Saguenay and became the Saguenay 98.3. The team is now called Jonquière Marquis.

== Government ==
=== Municipal ===
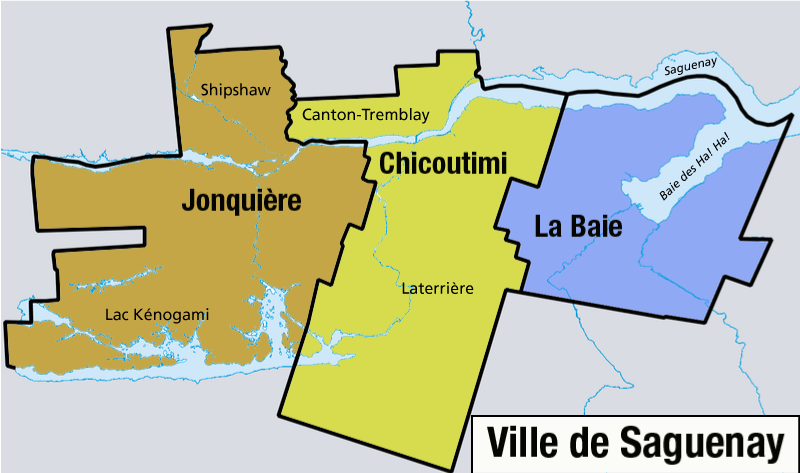
City boroughs

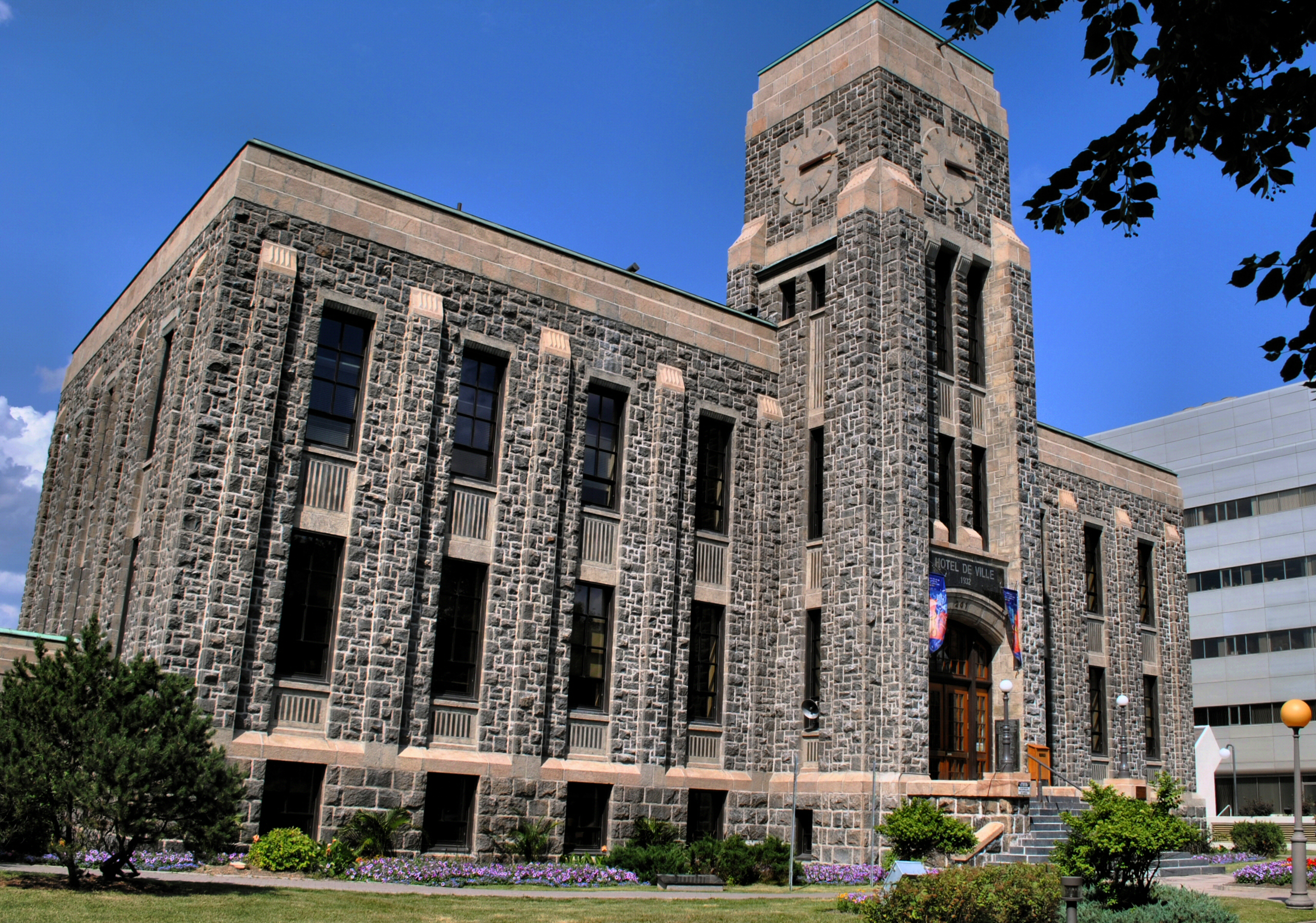
The City Hall of Saguenay

Luc Boivin has been mayor of Saguenay since 2025. Julie Dufour served as mayor from 2021 to 2025. Josée Néron served as mayor from 2017 to 2021. Jean Tremblay had previously served as mayor of Saguenay from the municipal merger of 2002 until 2017. He was also mayor of the now defunct city of Chicoutimi from 1997 until 2001. The governing body of Saguenay is Saguenay City Council, which consists of the mayor and 15 city councillors. The councillors are elected from single-member districts.

The city's three boroughs are Jonquière, Chicoutimi, and La Baie. Each borough is subdivided into electoral districts, with each district being represented by a city councillor. Each borough has a borough president from among their city councilors.

=== Federal and provincial ===
Saguenay federal election results
Year	Liberal		Conservative		Bloc Québécois		New Democratic		Green	
2021	20%	14,824	35%	25,632	38%	27,864	5%	3,872	1%	1,018
2019	17%	13,248	28%	22,288	35%	27,629	16%	12,278	3%	2,044
2015	30%	21,065	17%	13,653	22%	17,665	29%	23,697	2%	1,388

Saguenay provincial election results
Year	CAQ		Liberal		QC solidaire		Parti Québécois	
2018	37%	28,269	17%	12,788	10%	8,012	33%	25,793
2014	20%	16,107	31%	25,238	6%	4,531	37%	29,791

Federally, Saguenay is part of two electoral districts. The riding of Chicoutimi—Le Fjord, which includes the boroughs of Chicoutimi and La Baie as well as most of the Le Fjord-du-Saguenay Regional County Municipality, and the riding of Jonquière, which includes the borough of Jonquière as well as the southern part and parts of the Le Fjord-du-Saguenay RCM.

Provincially, Saguenay is represented in four electoral districts. The electoral district of Chicoutimi includes the former city of Chicoutimi, and is represented by Andrée Laforest of the Coalition Avenir Québec. The electoral district of Dubuc, which covers the part of Saguenay as well as the Le Fjord-du-Saguenay RCM, is represented by François Tremblay of the Coalition Avenir Québec. The electoral district of Jonquière, which covers most of the borough of Jonquière, is represented by Sylvain Gaudreault of the Parti Québécois.

== Infrastructure ==
Thrice weekly passenger railway service is provided by Via Rail on the Montreal–Jonquière train, which runs from Montreal Central Station to Jonquière station.

The city is connected by highway to Quebec City by Quebec Route 175 to its south, and is also served by Quebec Route 172 and Quebec Route 170, which run east–west to the north and south of the Saguenay River, respectively.

The city is also served by the Bagotville Airport, which shares the Canadian Forces Base Bagotville aerodrome. It operates daily flights to Montreal-Trudeau International Airport as well as flights to Quebec City and Sept-Îles. It operates seasonal flights to Cancún, Mexico, and vacation destinations in Cuba. Another airfield, the former Chicoutimi/Saint-Honoré Aerodrome air force base, is located to the north of the city.

A pier in La Baie has been in operation since 2008 to accommodate cruise ships and tourists. The project required investment of about $33.75 million for the construction of a 370-metre (1,210 ft) wharf, a visitor centre ($5 million) and a port village.

Saguenay derives power from its water resources. The city owns three hydroelectric power stations, one operating in the borough of Jonquière and two others, Pont-Arnaud and Chute-Garneau, in operation since spring 2011.

Saguenay is one of several "megacities" where the pre-merger telephone rate centres have never been amalgamated. It is still split between four rate centres–Chicoutimi, Jonquière, La Baie and Laterrière. As a result, North American telephone customers placing calls to Saguenay may not recognize the charge details on their bills.

== Education ==
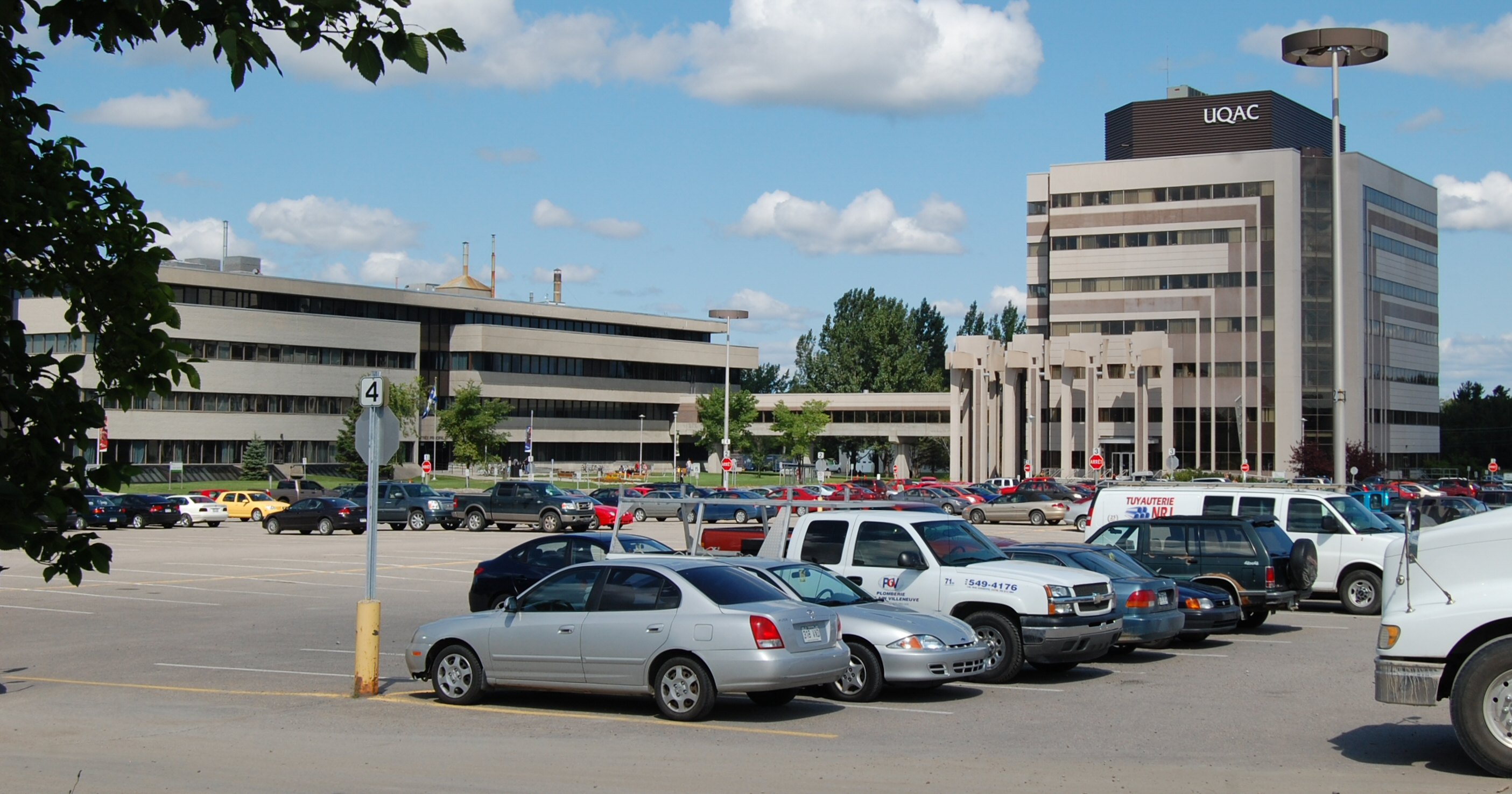
The Université du Québec à Chicoutimi main buildings

The francophone primary and secondary public schools of Saguenay are managed by two boards, the School Board of Jonquière, which has 11,015 students and the school board of Rives-du-Saguenay, with 11,048 students. These figures include 38 primary schools, seven secondary schools and five vocational training centres in the city, and institutions of neighboring municipalities of Upper and Lower Saguenay. The private elementary Apostolic School of Chicoutimi has 160 students. The Seminary of Chicoutimi has 1,100 high school students. Saguenay also has primary and secondary schools in English, with 200 students; Riverside Regional School is the responsibility of the Central Québec School Board.

At the college level, Saguenay has two colleges, located in Jonquière and in Chicoutimi, with a combined 5,500 students. In addition to offering pre-university programs, and similar curricula, each of the schools has unique programs. For example, the Cégep de Jonquière offers technical training in Art and Media Technology, while that of Chicoutimi offers technical training in piloting aircraft.

The University of Quebec at Chicoutimi (UQAC) is located in Saguenay; this francophone campus of the province's network has 6,500 students. It provides education at university level. As the only university in the Saguenay-Lac-Saint-Jean, this campus attracts students from across Quebec and la Francophonie. Located near downtown, the Chicoutimi campus includes a sports pavilion and the pavilion of the Humanities. The university has a flagship research centre in Arctic ice and other conditions; departments of Forestry, Medicine, and Arts; and the centre of aluminium technology.

=== Research ===
Saguenay has several main components of the regional aluminum sector: the Quebec Centre for Research and Development of Aluminum (CQRDA), the Centre for Aluminum Technology of UQAC (CTA), the University Centre for Aluminium Research (CURAL), and college and government training programs.

In 2007, the Quebec government announced, in conjunction with Genome Quebec, Université de Montréal, the Centre for Health and Social Services and UQAC Chicoutimi, the creation of a biobank specializing in genomics research. The CSSS de Chicoutimi also specializes in research in primary care medicine and chronic illness and the rehabilitation of neuromuscular disorders.

== Sister cities ==
- Camrose, Alberta
- Huế, Vietnam

== See also ==
- List of people from Saguenay–Lac-Saint-Jean
- Kingdom of Saguenay
- Société de transport du Saguenay
