= Act respecting the laicity of the State =

Statute of Quebec

Act respecting the laicity of the State Loi sur la laïcité de l'État

National Assembly of Quebec
- Citation: An Act respecting the laicity of the State, CQLR c L-0.3
- Passed by: Parliament of Quebec
- Passed: June 16, 2019
- Royal assent: June 16, 2019
- Effective: June 16, 2019

Legislative history
- Bill title: Bill 21, 1st Session, 42nd Legislature
- Introduced by: Simon Jolin-Barrette, Minister of Immigration, Diversity and Inclusiveness
- Status: In force

The Act respecting the laicity of the State (French: Loi sur la laïcité de l'État), introduced and commonly referred to as Bill 21 or Law 21 (French: Loi 21), is a statute passed by the National Assembly of Quebec in 2019 which asserts that Quebec is a lay state (secular state). It prohibits the wearing of religious symbols by certain public employees in positions of authority and those who were already in office when the bill was introduced. The statute operates despite the Quebec Charter of Human Rights and Freedoms, and also notwithstanding certain sections of the Canadian Charter of Rights and Freedoms.

On April 20, 2021, the Superior Court of Quebec upheld most of the law, despite stating that the law violates the freedom of expression and religion of religious minorities (especially Muslim women), because the National Assembly invoked the notwithstanding clause. However, the court did rule that the law was inoperative with respect to English-language school boards and members of the National Assembly as it infringed on their constitutional rights, which argues that minority language rights cannot be overridden by the notwithstanding clause. The Government of Quebec appealed the judgment to the Quebec Court of Appeal. The Autonomous Federation of Education also decided to bring the case to the higher court. English-language school boards must apply the statute until the appeal is decided; an interlocutory application to temporarily exempt the school boards from it was rejected by the Quebec Court of Appeal in November 2021.

While the statute is supported by most of Quebec's population, some argue that it does not go far enough and should extend to daycares, while others argue that the statute is discriminatory against religious groups like Muslims, Jews, and Sikhs. Disapproval of the statute is more widespread in English Canada than in French Canada.

== Contents and passage ==
The conservative, nationalist party Coalition Avenir Québec (CAQ) had campaigned for a law related to laicity during the 2018 provincial election. After the CAQ gained a majority in the National Assembly of Quebec, it introduced Bill 21 on March 28, 2019. As enacted, the law bans public workers in positions of "authority" from wearing religious symbols, specifically while they are on duty. According to the text of the bill, the laicity of the state is defined by a neutral religious stance, keeping state and religious affairs apart, as well as promoting equality and freedom of conscience and religion among citizens.

The first section of An Act Respecting laicity of the State asserts that Quebec is a "lay State". The laicity of the state is based on four principles:

- the equality of all citizens
- the separation of State and religions
- the religious neutrality of the State
- freedom of conscience and freedom of religion

According to the second paragraph of section 4, "State laicity also requires that all persons have the right to lay parliamentary, government and judicial institutions, and to lay public services".

Immigration Minister Simon Jolin-Barrette said all religious symbols, regardless of the size of the object, would be prohibited, but not religious tattoos or hairstyles such as Rastafarian dreadlocks. The law affects:

- Any public employee who carries a weapon, including police officers, courthouse constables, bodyguards, prison guards, and wildlife officers
- Crown prosecutors, government lawyers, and judges
- School principals, vice principals, and teachers

A grandfather clause exempts some public workers as long as they continue to hold the same job, at the same institution. The law also outlines rules that require people to uncover their faces to receive a public service for identification or security purposes, such as taking public transit with a reduced-fare photo ID card. However, people who have their faces covered for medical reasons or for job-related requirements are exempt from these rules.

The law applies when receiving government services, including:

- Municipal services such as public transit
- Doctors, dentists, and midwives in public institutions
- Subsidised daycares
- School boards

The Act also invokes section 33 of the Canadian Charter of Rights and Freedoms, the notwithstanding clause, and states that the Act shall have effect notwithstanding section 2 of the Canadian Charter (which protects freedom of religion and freedom of expression), and sections 7 to 15 of the Canadian Charter (section 15 of the Canadian Charter prohibits discrimination by governments, including on the basis of religion). The Act also states that it will apply despite sections 1 to 38 of the Quebec Charter of human rights and freedoms. These provisions were included to avoid legal challenges based on the Canadian Charter of Rights and Freedoms and the Quebec Charter of Human Rights and Freedoms, which was amended to assert that "state laicity" is of "fundamental importance".

François Legault initially supported keeping the crucifix that has been in the Legislative Assembly chamber since 1936, arguing the legislature's crucifix was a symbol of "heritage and history" rather than a religious icon and polls showing that over 55% of Quebecers supported the crucifix remaining. The crucifix was eventually removed.

It passed on June 16, 2019 by a 73–35 vote, with the backing of the CAQ and the Parti Québécois (PQ). The Quebec Liberal Party and Québec solidaire were opposed. The CAQ government also introduced last-minute amendments toughening the law, making provisions for a minister to verify that it is being obeyed and to demand corrective measures if necessary.

=== 2024 Renewal ===
On May 2, 2024, the National Assembly of Quebec voted to renew Bill 21 by using the notwithstanding clause for five more years until 2029. The assembly vote was 83 for and 26 opposed. The CAQ and PQ parties voted for the bill, while the Quebec Liberal Party and Québec solidaire voted against it.

=== Bill 9 (2025) ===
On November 27, 2025, the Coalition Avenir Québec party tabled Bill 9 that would strengthen Bill 21 passed in 2019.

On April 2 2026, The National Assembly in Quebec passed Bill 9 that expands on its secularism law Bill 21. It bans wearing religious symbols for daycare workers and prayer spaces in public institutions. CAQ and Parti Québécois, voted in favour of the legislation, while the Liberals and Québec Solidaire voted against it.

== Prior legislations ==
Prior to the Quiet Revolution in the 1960s, Quebec was heavily influenced by the Catholic Church, including the education system. The arrangement was unpopular, with many older Quebeckers later reporting negative experiences while in school. People saw the role of the church as a "necessary step on the road to modernity, to building a secular, more egalitarian society, freed from the evils of superstition". Religion came to be seen as a social construct that society and people can choose to adopt or disregard.

=== Proposed Charter of Values (2013) ===
The Parti Québécois in 2013 under Premier Pauline Marois proposed the Quebec Charter of Values, a law banning the display of "ostentatious" religious symbols, but they were unable to pass it before losing an election some months thereafter.

=== Bill 62 (2017) ===
An act to foster adherence to State religious neutrality and, in particular, to provide a framework for requests for accommodations on religious grounds in certain bodies, introduced as Bill 62 and passed by Premier Philippe Couillard's Liberal government in October 2017 made world headlines. The law banned a person whose face is covered from delivering or receiving a public service. Justice Minister Stéphanie Vallée stated that people could seek religious exemption on a "case by case" basis.

==== Criticism ====
The ban has worried some Muslims who consider female veiling a necessary part of their religion, defining the move as Islamophobia. The ban also worried Sikh men, who would be unable to wear their religious headgear. There were calls for criticism, arguing that the bill unfairly targets specific religions rather than all of them. This argument arises because some religious garments are easier to remove or hide under regular clothing such as crosses used in Christianity compared to turbans, hijabs, and burqas. Prime Minister Justin Trudeau spoke out against it. Several scholars have also criticised the ban. The ban was challenged by the Canadian Civil Liberties Association and the National Council of Canadian Muslims in the Quebec Superior Court. Meanwhile, the Parti Québécois (PQ) and the Coalition Avenir Québec (CAQ) argued the ban was not extensive enough. Some journalists accused Couillard of supporting the ban for "perceived political advantage", while a majority of the general public expressed their support for this move.

==== Public opinion ====
With regard to public opinion, a 2017 Ipsos poll found that 76 percent of Quebecers backed Bill 62, with 24 percent opposing it. The same survey found that 68 percent of Canadians, in general, supported a law similar to Bill 62 in their part of Canada. A 2017 Angus Reid Institute poll found that 70 percent of Canadians outside of Quebec supported "legislation similar to Bill 62" where they lived in the country, with 30 percent opposing it.

==== Court challenges ====
Several legal challenges were filed against the law and a judge ruled that the face-covering ban cannot be applicable while analyzed by another court, because of the irreversible injury it may cause some women of the Muslim faith. Another judge granted an injunction on that section questioned in court by the National Council of Canadian Muslims with the participation of the Canadian Civil Liberties Association. In the judgment of the court, said section contravenes the freedoms guaranteed by the Quebec Charter of Human Rights and Freedoms, and the Canadian Charter of Rights and Freedoms.

The Quebec Liberal Party government confirmed that it would not appeal the suspension of the key article of its Religious Neutrality Act. The Government of Quebec preferred to wait for a judgement on the substance and constitutionality of the law.

If the Liberal government had been re-elected in the general election on October 1, 2018, Premier Philippe Couillard said he would be ready to go to the Supreme Court of Canada, if necessary, to defend Bill 62. From his previous comments on the matter, Couillard was not likely to preserve the face covering the ban by invoking section 33 of the Canadian Charter of Rights and Freedoms, the notwithstanding clause. Couillard stated that his government, in passing Bill 62, did not use the notwithstanding clause by design, asserting that the court would uphold his government's limited ban as reasonable and justified.

== Reception ==
=== Government ===
Premier François Legault said the bill was moderate and that by having a law like this, it would prevent a party like France's Marine Le Pen National Rally in Quebec.

=== Opposition ===
The Quebec Liberal Party said the law would go too far, particularly with respect to Muslim women, and continued to advocate a ban only on religious clothing which covered the face, such as the niqab. Québec solidaire said that it was opposed to any ban on the wearing of religious symbols. Quebec Liberal leadership candidate, Dominique Anglade, argued that "We are all in favour of secularism, but not the way it was done with Bill 21." The Parti Québécois said the ban did not go far enough, and that it should have been extended to public daycare workers, as in its proposed legislation.

Gérard Bouchard and Charles Taylor, authors of the Bouchard-Taylor report on reasonable accommodations, raised concern that the law makes the province not look like a "decent society" and will only feed an intolerance toward minorities. In 2026, Bouchard elaborated by stating that the theoretical and legislative framework was flawed, Legault distorted the definition behind the Bouchard-Taylor report and that the act prevents citizens, who want to integrate into Quebec, from contributing to society.

Various forms of resistance to Bill 21 have emerged since its inception. Some are the legal challenges described below. The Coalition Inclusion Quebec is taking legal action on the basis that Bill 21 specifically targets Muslim women. The Coalition Inclusion Quebec is challenging the use of the notwithstanding clause because it cannot be used against Section 28 of the Charter, regarding gender discrimination. Another court case is being filed by the English Montreal School Board on the basis of violating minority language rights. Calgary City Council and Edmonton City Council voted unanimously to condemn Bill 21 with mayors Naheed Nenshi of Calgary and Don Iveson of Edmonton urging other municipal governments to speak out against Bill 21.

New Democratic Party leader Jagmeet Singh said that he would support federal intervention in court to challenge Bill 21.

Federal antisemitism envoy Irwin Cotler has called Bill 21 "discriminatory", adding that "It does not so much separate religion and state as it authorizes state interference with religion".

William Steinberg compares Bill 21 to "ethnic cleansing" as it discriminates against minority religions that have more requirements for religious clothing and headgear.

=== Support ===
A 2019 poll conducted by Forum Research reported the law enjoyed 64 per cent support in Quebec.

The Parti Québécois supports it but, said the ban did not go far enough, and that it should have been extended to public daycare workers, as in its proposed legislation.

Mouvement laïque québécois supports the Bill, but they say it doesn't go far enough.

Several studies show that the Quebec population was more in favour of banning Sikh and Muslim religious symbols. In a survey conducted in December 2018 by Angus Reid, respondents were significantly more in favour of allowing Judeo-Christian religious symbols to wear (between 57% and 42% of support) such as crucifixes and kippahs and more in favour of banning Sikh and Muslim religious symbols such as the hijab or dastar. In a poll conducted by Leger, the hijab was perceived positively by only 26% of respondents compared to 55% for the Christian cross. 88% of Quebecers who had a negative view of Islam supported banning teachers from wearing religious symbols. For Claire Durand, a sociology professor at the University of Montreal, "This leads to the conclusion that there is no support for the secularism of the state, but rather a resistance to recent diversity."

A 2022 study by the Association for Canadian Studies shows that the majority of supporters of Bill 21 have negative views of Islam (75%), Sikhism (66.1%), while a minority of them 36.5% had a negative view of Christianity (36.%) or Judaism (49.0%). With regard to religious symbols, the majority of supporters of Bill 21 had a negative opinion of the hijab (78.1%), the Sikh dastar (75.7%) and the kippah (54.6%). As for the Christian cross, only 38.5% of supporters had a negative opinion of this symbol.

=== Federal elections ===
Bill 21 was debated in the 2019 federal election. Bloc Quebecois leader Yves-Francois Blanchet stated this was a provincial matter and not relevant to the federal government's jurisdiction but did campaign in favour of Bill 21. When explaining why being called a nationalist to Canada Press is not seen a pejorative in Quebec society, Joseph Yvon Thériault, a sociology professor at University of Quebec at Montreal, compared Bill 21 to stricter legislation in European countries such as France and Belgium as an argument that Quebec nationalism is based on moderation. Although Trudeau initially spoke out against the idea of the bill in 2017, he did not take any actual action to prevent the bill from passing. During his election campaign in 2019, he avoided the topic as much as possible in order to maintain popularity in the polls within Quebec. The consensus among the 2019 candidates was that the bill was a provincial issue and they would not pursue action at a federal level if elected. Including NDP leader Jagmeet Singh who would personally be affected by the bill while in Quebec.

During the 2021 federal election, The English-language debate gained notoriety when the moderator Shachi Kurl posed a question to Blanchet that suggested some in English speaking Canada may view Quebec's law on secularism as "discriminatory". He challenged her use of that word, and the response was seen as a turning point in the Bloc's campaign, which saw an upsurge in the polls after the debate. The Quebec National Assembly passed a motion calling for a formal apology for the question.

=== Provincial elections ===
During the 2026 provincial election, Aisha Issa, the Parti Québécois candidate in Maurice-Richard found it regrettable that women wearing the veil to cover their hair cannot practice their profession as educators in Quebec by arguing that secularism should be considered a matter of spirituality, during a interview on the podcast Suis-je québécoise?.

== Court challenges ==
Since the law was first introduced in 2019, it has faced many legal challenges.

The National Council of Canadian Muslims (NCCM) and the Canadian Civil Liberties Association (CCLA) filed a legal challenge against the law which aimed to stay its application. The groups argue that the law is unconstitutional, irreparably harms religious minorities, and constitutes "state-sanctioned second-class citizenship". The Quebec Court of Appeal later granted the petitioning organisations leave to appeal the claim for an injunction. The Coalition Inclusion Quebec announced a challenge to the ruling at the Quebec Court of Appeal in order to strike down the entire law. A 29-day hearing into challenges to the law was heard in the Quebec Superior Court in 2020.

In April 2021, Quebec Superior Court judge Marc-André Blanchard ruled that the law violated the freedom of expression and religion of religious minorities (especially Muslim women). Blanchard stated the law "in one way [violates] their freedom of religion, and in another, [does] the same in regards to their freedom of expression, since clothing constitutes both pure and simple expression, and also the manifestation of a religious belief." Nevertheless, he upheld most of the ban as the government had invoked the notwithstanding clause. However, he ruled that the provisions were unconstitutional, to the extent they applied to English-language school boards, as the notwithstanding clause cannot be used to restrict minority language rights protected by the Canadian Charter Rights and Freedoms. Similarly, the notwithstanding clause cannot be used to restrict rights granted by Section 3 of the Canadian Charter to elected members of the legislative assemblies, so the law was unconstitutional to the extent it purported to apply to members of the National Assembly.

On February 29 2024, The Quebec Court of Appeal ruled in favor of Quebec's Bill 21.

In 2025, the Supreme Court of Canada agreed to hear a challenge to the bill, with the court expected to rule on how provinces can invoke Section 33 of the Canadian Charter of Rights and Freedoms, the notwithstanding clause.

== See also ==
- Laïcité
- French ban on face covering
- Hijab by country § Canada
- Islam in Canada
