= Jean Tremblay =

Canadian politician and businessman

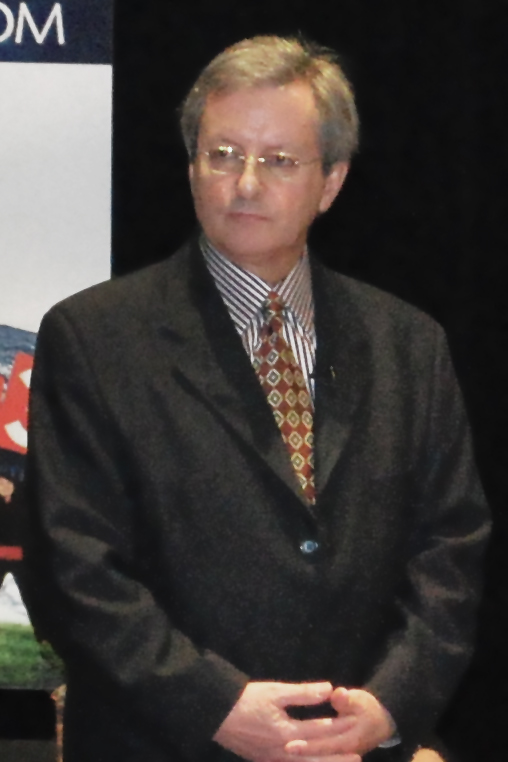

Mayor of Saguenay
- In office January 1, 2002 – November 16, 2017
- Succeeded by: Josée Néron

Mayor of Chicoutimi
- In office 1997–2002
- Preceded by: Ulric Blackburn
- Succeeded by: Position abolished

Personal details
- Born: Jean Eugène Gabriel André Tremblay; November 29, 1948 (age 77) Chicoutimi, Quebec
- Party: CAQ (provincial); Conservative (federal)
- Education: Université Laval
- Profession: Notary

Jean Tremblay (born November 29, 1948) is a Canadian businessman and politician who was mayor of Saguenay, Quebec, Canada, from 2002 to 2017. Before that he was mayor of Chicoutimi since 1996.

Tremblay received international attention from his fight to maintain the saying of Catholic prayers before city council meeting. The Canadian Supreme Court. In Mouvement laïque québécois v Saguenay (City) (2015) ruled against the city.

Tremblay was born in Saguenay–Lac-Saint-Jean region of Quebec. He is a notary by profession and a businessman. After the municipal reorganizations in Quebec, on 1 January 2002 he became the first magistrate of the new city of Saguenay. Tremblay was reelected in November 2005, receiving 72% of the vote, and again in November 2009 with 78% support, described as a "dazzling victory." In 2013, Tremblay received 63% of the vote.

Tremblay worked to attract more cruise ships to the region. He also attempted to recover taxes owed by private hydroelectric plants within the city. In 2008 Tremblay was the first mayor in Quebec to implement « Gestion par activités » (City Stat Performance Strategy).

Tremblay established the position of city ombudsman and initiated the city's first website. He also started use of social media such as Facebook and Twitter.

== Biography ==
Jean Tremblay was born in 1948 in Chicoutimi and attended local schools. He obtained a law degree from Université Laval in 1974. He received his diploma in notary law from the same university and became a member of the Chamber of Notaries of Quebec in 1975.

Tremblay became a practicing notary in Chicoutimi in 1975. In 1979, he became partner in a St-Hubert restaurant in Chicoutimi. He was also the majority shareholder in a real estate company from 1979 to 1997. He taught in the Department of Administrative Sciences University of Quebec at Chicoutimi during the 1980–1981 school year.

=== Municipal mayor ===
In 1996, Tremblay was elected mayor of Chicoutimi, serving from 1997 to 2001. Tremblay supported the 21st-century merger of seven municipalities (Chicoutimi, Jonquière, La Baie, Laterrière, a portion of the territory of Canton-Tremblay, Lac Kénogami and Shipshaw) into a new city, later named Saguenay. His office issued the document entitled Le courage de changer les choses (The Courage to Change Things), to promote the consolidation.

On November 25, 2001, Tremblay was elected mayor of Saguenay. In 2002, Trembly founded Promotion Saguenay, to help develop the regional economy. That same year he became a member of the Union of Quebec Municipalities (UMQ). He has sat on the executive committee from 2004.

In early 2002, Tremblay held a referendum on the name of the new city. On April 12, 13 and 14, votes chose Saguenay, which received 35,810 votes (52.23%) to Chicoutimi's 32,399 votes (47.26%).

In 2004, Tremblay established the city ombudsman position. In 2005, he launched a case against multinationals to recover payment of taxes on private hydroelectric dams on the territory of the city. In 2006, Tremblay reaffirmed his support for reciting a Catholic prayer before City Council meetings. In 2007, Tremblay began promoting a port of call for cruise ships in the borough of La Baie. This has led to an increase of cruise ships and associated tourist business.

In April 2009, the polling firm Influence Communication, hired by Le Journal de Québec, published a study on the media weight of 11 mayors in Quebec. On this list, Jean Tremblay ranked third after Régis Labeaume, Mayor of Quebec City; and Gérald Tremblay, Mayor of Montreal.

Tremblay implemented the Gestion par activités » (City Stat Performance Strategy). This new model allegedly saved money and improved the efficiency of municipal services. He has presented this strategy to other municipalities.

In November 2009, Tremblay and the City of Saguenay were fined over half a million dollars by the Superior Court of Quebec, to be paid to Bertrand Girard, the former general manager of the city, for 'wrongful dismissal' by Tremblay. Judge Yves Alain criticized Tremblay and said his testimony was rife with "hesitations and contradictions;" he said certain parts were "pure science fiction". Judge Alain said none of the reasons given by the mayor for his decision to fire Girard was valid; in his opinion the mayor was trying to hide a personal animosity toward Girard.

In October 2010, the regional Saguenay-Lac-Saint-Jean of the Federation of Professional Journalists of Québec published a black file on the municipal information in Saguenay. The eight journalists from different media reported intimidation in their trying to collect data and alleged that records were altered; they said that the city administration and Tremblay threatened the freedom of the press. The next day, the mayor said, "The black file, it does not bother me too much. I think it's ridiculous. They would do it on any mayor, anyone. [...] My job is not to satisfy the journalists it is to satisfy the citizens."

The same year, Tremblay's administration established the interactive site 'Villeenaction.com. Since October 2012 Mayor Tremblay has been on Twitter.

==== Prayer of the City Council ====
In September 2006, Christian Joncas and Alain Simoneau, activists from the Mouvement laïque québécois (MLQ) and the Coalition of Citizens of Saguenay, filed a complaint with the Commission on Human Rights and Youth Rights (CDPDJ) against Tremblay for reciting a short prayer at the beginning of each Saguenay City Council meeting. Tremblay had practiced this tradition as mayor of Chicoutimi.

The municipal prayer reads:

"Almighty God, we thank you for the great blessings which You have given to Saguenay and its citizens, including freedom, opportunities for development and peace. Guide us in our deliberations as members of City Council and help us to be well aware of our duties and responsibilities. Grant us wisdom, knowledge and understanding that will preserve the benefits enjoyed by our city for all to enjoy and enable us to make wise decisions. Amen."

Despite the complaint, the City Council voted to retain this practice. In October of that year, following an investigation by the Commission on Human Rights, a mediation session was held between the parties to seek a resolution. Joncas withdrew his complaint.

In September 2007, Tremblay presented a paper about the issue, "Memoir of reasonable accommodation, Ville Saguenay" to the Bouchard-Taylor Commission during its hearings. It was gathering information on how cultural, ethnic and religious minorities are and should be accommodated in the province under existing law. His paper defended the traditional place of the Catholic religion in public life in Quebec, where 95% of the people identify as Catholic. Community participation in church life has declined. This paper, published online in Les Classiques des sciences sociales, generated controversy.

On May 15, 2008, the CDPDJ ruled that the prayers at Saguenay City Council meetings violated provisions for freedom of conscience and religion in Quebec and Canadian society. With the support of the City Council, Tremblay continued his practice. In August 2008, supported by the MLQ, Alain Simoneau filed a civil suit, claiming $100,000 in damages and fees for extrajudicial rights abuses and violation of freedom of religion and conscience. Simoneau asked that the city stop the practice of prayers at city meetings, and that it remove religious symbols in municipal spaces: a statue of the Sacred Heart in a public room used by the Chicoutimi district, and a crucifix from the boardroom of the Bay district.

In February 2011, the Court of Human Rights ordered Tremblay and city of Saguenay to stop the prayer, to remove the religious symbols from the public rooms, and to pay 30 000 CAD as damages to Simoneau. Tremblay said he intended to appeal the ruling, and with the city council launched a fundraising campaign for donations to take the case to the Canadian Supreme Court.

A Léger poll, found that 61% of the population of Saguenay-Lac-Saint-Jean, disagreed with the decision of the Human Rights Tribunal, only 34% of respondents agree with the judgment.

This case was covered nationally, and Tremblay attracted wide media coverage. In late March 2011, the appellate court authorized the Mayor and City Saguenay to appeal the decision. Tremblay said, "[...] This battle, I do it because I love Christ. When I reach the other side, I can be a little proud. I will say, "I fought for you, I even went on trial for you." On July 12, 2011, Canadian Press said the Tremblay 's fundraising campaign had raised $181,000, compared to the MLQ, which had received $25,000 in that period. The hearing was scheduled for Monday, November 26, 2012, in Quebec before Judge France Thibault. Tremblay argued that the prayer was part of the Catholic heritage of Quebec.

On April 12, 2015, the Supreme Court ruled unanimously in Mouvement laïque québécois v Saguenay (City) against Tremblay and the city, saying recitation of the prayer at the municipal meeting was unconstitutional because of freedom of conscience and religion. It said the state had an obligation to be neutral, and "This neutrality requires that the state neither favour nor hinder any particular belief, and the same holds true for non-belief. It requires that the state abstain from taking any position and thus avoid adhering to a particular belief." It did not address the religious symbols, as it said the Tribunal had not ruled on this, and the Appeals Court was in error to make a ruling about their use.

=== Media relations ===
Tremblay has frequently appeared on regional television stations and provincial governments. He was host of a television series shown on Channel Community Saguenay Canal Vox. He was invited by national networks such as LCN to discuss various topics. In April 2009, the firm Influence Communication, initiated by Le Journal de Québec, published a study on the media weight of 11 mayors of Quebec. On this list, Jean Tremblay ranks third after Régis Labeaume, Mayor of Quebec, and Gérald Tremblay, Mayor of Montreal. Of the 11 mayors surveyed, the first magistrate of Saguenay gets a percentage of media coverage locally, nationally and internationally valued at 7.5%.

== Writings ==
- Croire ça change tout (2013).
- Croire ça change tout, Édition des Oliviers, Montréal, 2014, 198 pages. ISBN 978-2-923378-25-1. (second edition)

== Municipal policy papers ==
- 1999 - City of Chicoutimi, Le courage de changer les choses: un projet à construire pour les générations à venir; University of Quebec à Chicoutimi
- 2002 - City of Sanguenay, Les régions du Québec en crise: bilan, enjeux et voie de solutions (Quebec regions in crisis: Balance sheet, issues, and the way of solutions)
- 2003 - City of Sanguenay, Des droits ancestraux et du droit à l’égalité des chances (Aboriginal rights and the right to equal opportunity) — Mémoire présenté à la Commission parlementaire des institutions touchant l’entente de principe d’ordre général entre les premières nations de Mamuitun et Nutashkuan et le gouvernement du Québec et le gouvernement du Canada
- 2003 - Ville de Saguenay, un pôle majeur de croissance pour le Québec (City of Saguenay, a major site of growth for Quebec)- Mémoire présenté à la Commission parlementaire sur l’aménagement du territoire touchant la Loi concernant la consultation des citoyens sur la réorganisation territoriale de certaines municipalités
- 2004 - Saguenay, une ville tournée vers l’avenir (Saguenay, a city turned to the future)- Mémoire présenté au ministre des Finances dans le cadre des consultations prébudgétaires
- 2007 - City of Saguenay, Mémoire sur les accommodements raisonnables, Montréal: Les Éditions Anne Sigier
- 2010 - Mémoire sur le projet de loi 94, Loi établissant les balises encadrant les demandes d'accommodement dans l'Administration gouvernementale et dans certains établissements
