= Quebec Charter of Values =

Bill 60 in the Canadian province of Quebec

National Assembly of Quebec
- Long title: Charter affirming the values of State secularism and religious neutrality and the equality between women and men, and providing a framework for accommodation requests

Legislative history
- Bill title: Bill 60
- Introduced by: Bernard Drainville MNA, Minister responsible for Democratic Institutions and Active Citizenship
- First reading: November 7, 2013
- Status: Not passed

The Charter of Quebec Values (French: Charte des valeurs québécoises [ʃaʁt de valœʁ kebekwaz] or Charte de la laïcité [ʃaʁt də la laisite]) was Bill 60 in the Canadian province of Quebec, introduced by the governing Parti Québécois in 2013 under Premier Pauline Marois, trying to legislate the Quebec controversy on reasonable accommodation. The PQ cabinet member forwarding the bill was Bernard Drainville, Minister responsible for Democratic Institutions and Active Citizenship. Premier Marois also threatened invoking the notwithstanding clause of the Constitution of Canada to pass the Charter in 2013. There was much controversy in Quebec and elsewhere about the charter, especially its proposed prohibition of public sector employees from wearing or displaying conspicuous religious symbols.

The proposal would have included the following provisions:

- Amend the Quebec Charter of Human Rights and Freedoms
- Establish a duty of neutrality and reserve for all state personnel (including state-funded education and health care workers).
- Limit the wearing of conspicuous religious symbols for said personnel.
- Make it mandatory to have one's face uncovered when providing or receiving a state service.
- Establish an implementation policy for state organizations.

The PQ had a minority government; Marois called an early election to obtain a greater vote of confidence. The political objective of the PQ was to foster an alliance between seemingly opposing groups, the traditionalists and the progressives, in order to facilitate the emergence of a new type of majority. The bill died as of the 2014 election, which was won by the Quebec Liberal Party. The Charter of Quebec Values was argued to be a contributing factor in the PQ's loss of power (although the bill was polled with higher public opinion support than the governing party itself). The Liberals were opposed to the legislation, but party leader Philippe Couillard pledged during the campaign to put forward a less strict set of measures on the reasonable accommodation issue.

In 2019, The Coalition Avenir Québec government passed a similar bill in Bill 21.

== Chronology ==
The proposal was first announced on May 22, 2013. The Charter was officially proposed on September 10, 2013. The bill died on the order paper as of March 5, 2014. During the subsequent election campaign Premier Pauline Marois promised that if elected she would apply the notwithstanding clause to shield the Charter from legal challenges.

== Symbols ==
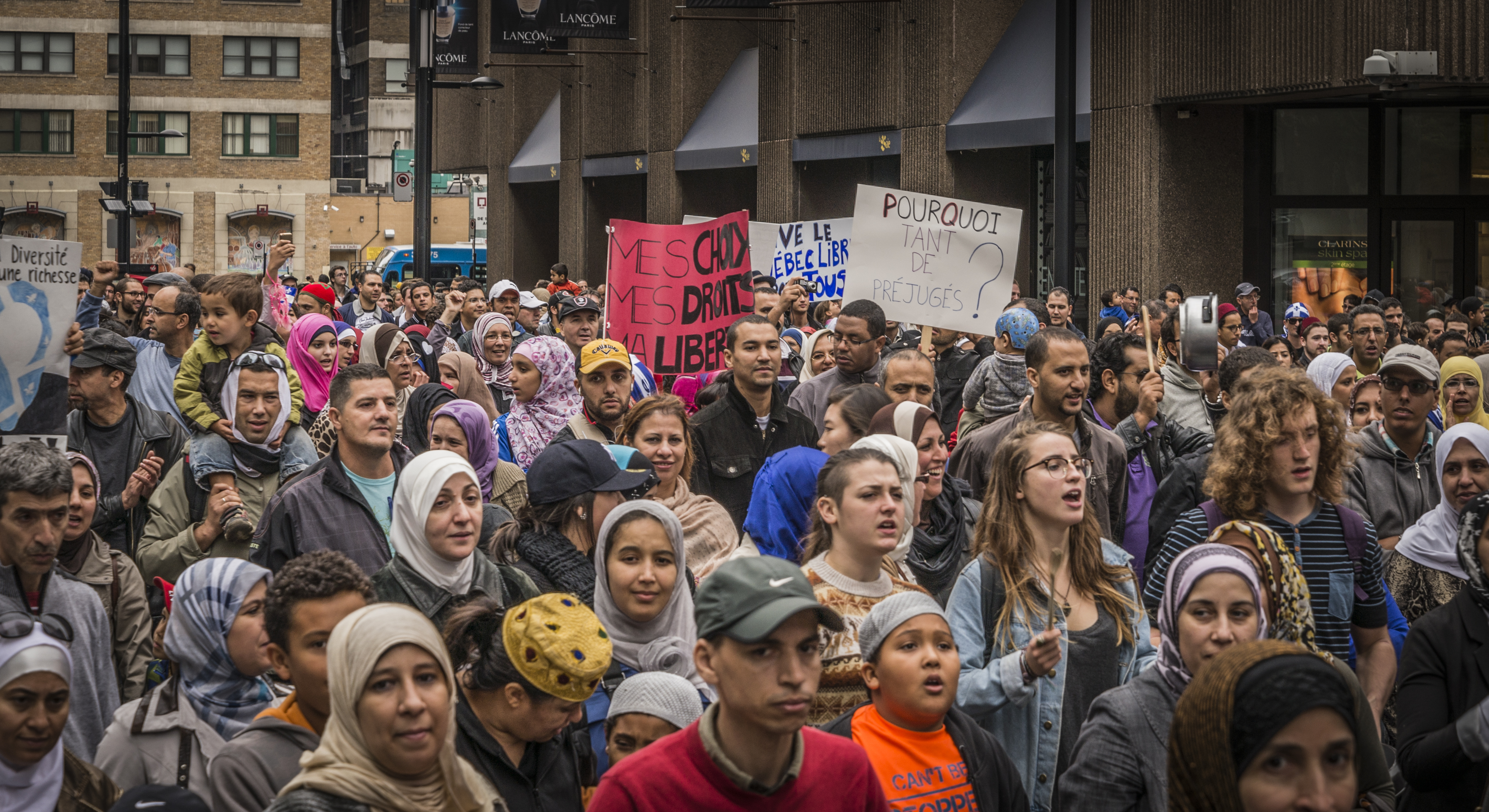
Protest Saturday, September 14, 2013 in Montreal

The most controversial of all provisions seems to be about the restriction of the public sector employees from wearing or displaying conspicuous religious symbols.

According to the bill, relatively discreet items such as a finger ring, earring, or small pendants bearing a religious symbol will be allowed, while more obvious items such as a kippah, turban, hijab, niqāb, and larger crosses and religious pendants would be prohibited.

Elected politicians would be exempt and temporary opt-out provisions have been proposed for universities and hospitals. Furthermore, certain items and customs with an ostensibly religious nature, such as the large crucifix on display in the Quebec National Assembly, and observing Christmas are exempt on the rationale of them reflecting the province's cultural heritage. This has led to the widespread belief that this measure is motivated by an act of ethnocentric hypocrisy.

== Reactions ==
The charter was popular in the beginning, but constant attacks reduced the support occasionally to 50% of the population.

=== Quebec political parties ===
In Quebec itself, the provincial Official Opposition, the Quebec Liberal Party, enjoying an increase in support since the announcement of this Charter, declared that it would oppose passing this bill to the point of triggering an election over the issue. Coalition Avenir Québec leader François Legault proposed a compromise with a more limited ban with health care workers and daycare workers exempted.

Former PQ premier Jacques Parizeau did not feel the end of the bill justified its means.

=== Federal political parties ===
The reaction to this bill has been divisive with most of the major Federal political parties denouncing this proposal. For instance, Justin Trudeau of the Liberal Party of Canada described this measure as a cynical wedge issue designed to foment conflict with the Federal Government of Canada to promote Quebec separatism when it is challenged in the courts as unconstitutional while Thomas Mulcair of the New Democratic Party of Canada declared it unacceptable, deriding it while speaking to the press as "state-sponsored discrimination". Prime Minister Stephen Harper noted that the bill will likely not become law, but will take whatever action necessary in the event that it does. Member of Parliament Maria Mourani was expelled from the Bloc Québécois for complaining that the proposed Charter is an act of political opportunism over human rights.

=== Commission des droits de la personne et des droits de la jeunesse ===
Quebec's human rights commission, the Commission des droits de la personne et des droits de la jeunesse condemned the proposed charter as a "radical" infringement on fundamental rights.

=== Other groups ===
The Canadian Civil Liberties Association submitted a brief to the Quebec National Assembly's Committee on Institutions. They described Bill 60 as a profoundly disturbing law that would violate fundamental freedoms and cannot 'be justified in a free and democratic society' as the Canadian Charter of Rights and Freedoms requires. CCLA posits that the Bill violates freedom of religion, freedom of expression, the right to equality, and the right to be free from discrimination. CCLA mentions inconsistencies in the law that would be disproportionate upon members of minority faith traditions. They urged the Quebec government to abandon the bill.

The National Council of Canadian Muslims also submitted a brief to the Quebec National Assembly on Bill 60. They described the bill as discriminatory and that it would violate religious freedoms of the Muslim community. The NCCM urged the opposition parties in the Quebec National Assembly to defeat Bill 60.

The president of the Mouvement laïque québécois, Lucie Jobin, wrote that she "is delighted that secularism is registered on it - it is a public value of social cohesion - but we express many reservations. It would be a two-speed secularism".

On November 13, Jewish General Hospital executive director Dr. Lawrence Rosenberg called the proposed charter "flawed and contrary to Quebec's spirit of inclusiveness and tolerance" and said that the hospital would ignore it if passed, in a written statement endorsed by the hospital's board of directors.

On January 12, 2014, an independent documentary, Québec 60: un documentaire, was published on YouTube to counter the Quebec Charter of Values. The documentary focuses on women who wear the veil and who live in the province of Quebec. It also tackles the Charter's effects on other religious minorities: the Sikh and the Jewish communities. On its first week of release, the online documentary gathered more than 18,000 views.

On February 15, 2014, an independent documentary, La charte des distractions, (English: the Charter of Distractions) was published by a collective of independent media groups which consisted of G.A.P.P.A., Les Alter Citoyens, and 99%Media as a critical view and analysis of the Quebec Charter of Values and how it represented a distraction from the real social, economic, and environmental issues that have been further exacerbated by the successive austerity measures imposed by the Parti Québécois and the Parti libéral du Québec before it. The documentary also drew parallels with what had happened a year earlier during the 2012 Quebec Maple spring protests. The documentary also drew parallels with the Idle No More movement and the treatment of First Nations peoples. The documentary was released openly to the public on YouTube and received significant media attention.

=== Public reaction ===
Some half of Quebeckers supported the Charter at its peak, according to polls. It was, however, not a major electoral motivation issue.

The public reaction has included at least one public incident where a Quebec woman of Algerian origin wearing an Islamic veil was accosted in Laurier Québec shopping centre in Quebec City by a woman citing the charter who demanded they change their religion and remove the headscarf. Another incident occurred when a white male harassed a hijab-wearing woman on a bus in Montreal. In response, there have been at least two public protest marches in Montreal of people of various faiths denouncing the Charter. There have also been at least two marches in support of the charter, including the "Janettes" movement of women for secularism.

== See also ==
- Act respecting the laicity of the State
- Canadian values
- Hérouxville
