= Human Rights Tribunal of Quebec =

Human Rights Tribunal
- Tribunal des droits de la personne
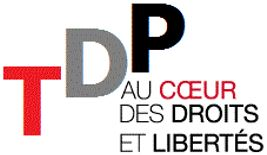
- Established: December 10, 1990
- Jurisdiction: Quebec
- Authorised by: Members are appointed by the Government of Quebec in accordance with the Charter of Human Rights and Freedoms
- Appeals to: Court of Appeal, with leave
- Number of positions: There are presently 12 members (4 judges and 8 assessors)
- Language: French and English
- Type of tribunal: First instance tribunal
- Website: tribunaldesdroitsdelapersonne.ca/en/

President
- Currently: Christian Brunelle, J.C.Q.
- Since: September 3, 2024

The Human Rights Tribunal of Quebec (French: Tribunal des droits de la personne) is a specialized first-instance tribunal of the province of Quebec, Canada, that has the jurisdiction to hear and judge litigations concerning discrimination and harassment based on the prohibited grounds stipulated in the Charter of Human Rights and Freedoms, as well as concerning the exploitation of elderly or handicapped persons and affirmative action programs.

== History ==
The Human Rights Tribunal was created in accordance with the Quebec Charter of Human Rights and Freedoms.

The Tribunal was in fact born on December 10, 1990, pursuant to the Loi modifiant la Charte des droits et libertés de la personne concernant la Commission et instituant le Tribunal des droits de la personne, tabled in the National Assembly by Gil Rémillard, then Minister of Justice of Quebec, and adopted on June 22, 1989. This law modified the mechanism that ensured the protection of rights and freedoms in the Province, consisting solely of the Commission des droits de la personne at the time (in 1995, the Commission des droits de la personne became the Commission des droits de la personne et des droits de la jeunesse). The purpose of this law was to correct the difficulties highlighted in a 1988 report filed by the Committee on Institutions of the National Assembly, notably the restrictive interpretation of the Charter by the ordinary courts, the delays at the commission as well as the contradictory roles assumed by the commission.

In 1990, the Government of Quebec appointed Michèle Rivet, judge of the Court of Quebec, as President of the Human Rights Tribunal. She presided the Tribunal until 2010. Michèle Pauzé subsequently presided the Tribunal from 2010 to 2014. As of September 1, 2014, Ann-Marie Jones assumes the presidency of the Human Rights Tribunal. The Honourable Madeleine Aubé assumed the presidency of the Tribunal from September 2, 2022 to September 2, 2024. Since September 3, 2024, the Honourable Christian Brunelle has been Acting President of the Tribunal.

=== Past judgments ===
Since its creation, the Tribunal had rendered numerous judgments concerning new questions of law, including:

- October 10, 1991: The Tribunal rendered its first decision concerning the integration of a disabled child into the school system;
- March 26, 1992: The Tribunal rendered a significant decision regarding sexual harassment;
- May 13, 1994: The Tribunal rendered a decision regarding exploitation of the elderly, the first of its kind;
- September 11, 2008: The Tribunal, in the case Gaz Métropolitain deemed that the women were victims of systemic discrimination;
- February 9, 2011: Simoneau v. Tremblay — The Tribunal rendered a decision regarding the obligation of state religious neutrality in the case of prayer recitation at the Municipal Council meeting of the city of Saguenay;
- April 18, 2012: The Tribunal rendered its first judgment on racial profiling involving the city of Montreal and the SPVM;
- May 31, 2012: The Tribunal's first case concerning an employment affirmative action program;
- 2015: Mouvement laïque québécois v Saguenay (City) — the judgment led to the Supreme Court of Canada acknowledging the specialized jurisdiction of the Tribunal.
- July 20, 2016: Ward v. Quebec — The Tribunal rendered judgment in a case, opposing comedian Mike Ward and singer Jérémy Gabriel, that involved a conflict between two fundamental rights: the interdiction to discriminate based on a disability and the freedom of expression, notably in the context of artistic expression. This decision, confirmed by the Court of Appeal, was reversed by the Supreme Court of Canada in 2020.
- May 11, 2018: The Tribunal rendered concluded that more than 150 students were discriminated in employment, in violation of section 19 of the Charter which protects the right to equal salary or wages for people who perform equivalent work at the same place. This decision was confirmed by the Court of Appeal.

=== Past seminars ===
In order to facilitate "the development and elaboration of critical legal thinking in areas which fall under its jurisdiction" and to improve the protection of Human Rights in, the Tribunal has, over the years, organized several seminars in partnership with the legal community:

- The Human Rights Tribunal and the Société québécoise de droit international, Access to a Specialized Human Rights Tribunal: an Urgent Need to Act in ? (Direct Access of Individuals to Human Rights International and National Tribunals), Marriott Hotel Springhill Suites, Montreal, October 24, 2002;
- Human Rights Tribunal and Bar of Quebec, "La Charte des droits et libertés de la personne : Pour qui et jusqu’où? " (The Charter of Human Rights and Freedoms: For Whom and How Far?), Intercontinental Hotel, April 28–29, 2005;
- Human Rights Tribunal and Bar of Quebec, Access to a Specialized Human Rights Tribunal: an Urgent Need to Act in ?, Intercontinental Hotel, November 22–23, 2007;
- Human Rights Tribunal and Bar of Quebec, "Race, femme, enfant, handicap : Les conventions internationales et le droit interne à la lumière des enjeux pratiques du droit à l’égalité" (Race, Woman, Child, Disability: International Conventions in the Context of Practical Issues concerning the Right to Equality); Centre Mont-Royal, March 25–26, 2010;
- Human Rights Tribunal and Bar of Quebec, "Le Tribunal des droits de la personne : 25 ans d’expérience en matière d’égalité" (The Human Rights Tribunal: 25 years of experience in matters of equality), Intercontinental Hotel, Montreal, October 23, 2015.

=== Anniversaries ===
In 2015, the 25th anniversary of the Human Rights Tribunal was highlighted in the National Assembly of Quebec, as well as in several periodicals and newspapers, including the Journal du Barreau. Various activities were also organized in celebration of this anniversary, which coincided with the 40th anniversary of the Quebec Charter:

- April 1, 2015: The Honourable Ann-Marie Jones delivered a speech during the Conseil général du Barreau;
- June 11, 2015, the Tribunal animated a workshop at the Bar of Quebec's Annual Congress;
- September 10, 2015: The Honourable Ann-Marie Jones delivered a speech during the Ceremony of the Journée du Barreau. The ceremony highlighted the new judicial year 2015–2016;
- October 23, 2015: The Tribunal, in partnership with the Bar of Quebec, organized a seminar entitled "Le Tribunal des droits de la personne : 25 ans d’expérience en matière d’égalité" (The Human Rights Tribunal: 25 years of Experience in Matters of Equality).

In 2020, the Tribunal was supposed to celebrate its 30th anniversary. However, the activities organized to celebrate this event were cancelled due to the 2020 pandemic.

== Composition and roles ==
Pursuant to section 101 of the Quebec Charter, "The Tribunal is composed of not fewer than 7 members, including a president and assessors, appointed by the Government." Section 103 of the Quebec Charter stipulates that the Government may designate judges of the Court of Quebec to sit as members of the Tribunal.

The Tribunal's composition is hybrid, as some of its members (the judges) are an integral part of the legal system whereas others (the assessors) do not necessarily have to be members of the Bar nor jurists. Each member of the Tribunal, however, must have "experience and expertise in, sensitivity to and interest for matters of human rights and freedoms."

Currently, the Tribunal is composed of 17 members: 7 judges of the Court of Quebec, including the President, and 10 assessors. All assessors are jurists and members of the Bar, although it is not a requirement.

The cases submitted to Tribunal are heard by a division composed of three members (a judge and two assessors). Preliminary or incidental applications are heard only by a judge, save for certain exceptions. The Quebec Charter specifies the different roles and powers attributed to the members of the Tribunal, be they judge or assessor.

=== Role of Judges ===
Although the cases submitted to Tribunal are heard by a division consisting of three members, it is the judge who presides the hearing. Section 104 of the Quebec Charter stipulates that only the judges that have decision-making powers: they alone decide on the application, render decisions on issues raised during the course of the proceedings and sign the judgment.

==== President ====
Section 101 of the Quebec Charter stipulates that the President of the Tribunal is appointed by the Government, after consultation with the chief judge of the Court of Quebec, for a renewable five term. The President is the only full-time judge of the Tribunal.

Sections 106 and 110 of the Quebec Charter define some of the President's duties and responsibilities. The President must:

- Foster a consensus among the members concerning the general orientations of the Tribunal;
- Coordinate the work of the Tribunal and distribute it among the members;
- Prescribe a Code of ethics and ensure that it is observed;
- Adopt, with the assistance of the majority of the members, a regulation of procedure applicable to the Tribunal.

==== Designated Judges ====
Unlike the President, the length of the mandates of the judges named to the Tribunal is not prescribed by the Quebec Charter. The designated judges are appointed, on the request of the President and after consultation with the chief justice of the Court of Quebec, for a determined period that can be renewed.

The designated judges work part-time at the Tribunal. Between assignments, they continue to sit on the Court of Quebec, in their assigned divisions.

=== Role of Assessors ===
The assessors are appointed to the Tribunal following a procedure which is under the legislative authority of the Government of Quebec and which is similar to the procedure of nomination of provincial judges. As per Section 101 of the Charter, the assessors are appointed for a five-year term, renewable, and which may be prolonged for a shorter determined time.

As the judges, the assessors are independent and impartial. However, they do not have decision-making powers. Therefore, the assessors’ judicial functions at the Tribunal are indirect as they provide assistance to the judges.

The assessors are full members of the Tribunal; they work on an ad hoc basis, according to the work assigned by the President of the Tribunal. The assessors are not subject to exclusivity and may pursue their careers while working at the Tribunal.

== Jurisdiction ==
The Tribunal is a specialized tribunal. Its constituent act, the Quebec Charter, prescribes the Tribunal's powers, jurisdiction and manner in which it is seized.

=== Specialized jurisdiction ===
The Tribunal hears litigations in matters of:

- Discrimination (section 10 of the Quebec Charter): Direct discrimination, indirect discrimination, systemic discrimination and discriminatory profiling;
- Discriminatory harassment (section 10.1 of the Quebec Charter);
- Exploitation of elderly and/or disabled persons (section 48 of the Quebec Charter); and
- Affirmative Action Programs (section 86 of the Quebec Charter and the Act Respecting Equal Access to Employment in Public Bodies).

In 2015, in the judgment Mouvement laïque québécois v Saguenay (City), the Supreme Court of Canada acknowledged the specialized jurisdiction of the Tribunal.

The Tribunal, however, does not have exclusive jurisdiction: the ordinary courts (the Court of Quebec, the Superior Court of Quebec) as well as administrative tribunals may, in conformity with their respective jurisdictional competence, hear cases that fall under the jurisdiction of the Tribunal. In addition, certain specialized tribunals, such as the Tribunal administratif du Québec (TAQ) and labour arbitrators have an exclusive jurisdiction that allows them to examine, in an accessory manner, a dispute based on the Quebec Charter. In such a case, the Human Rights Tribunal cannot be seized of the litigation.

=== Accessing the Tribunal ===
The mechanism ensuring the protection of Human Rights, as specified in the Quebec Charter, involves two stages:

1. The complaint process at the Commission des droits de la personnes et des droits de la jeunesse;
2. The judicial process before the Human Rights Tribunal.

==== Complaint process ====
According to the Quebec Charter, any person who believing to be a victim of discrimination (in violation of section 10 of the Quebec Charter), of discriminatory harassment (in violation of section 10.1 of the Quebec Charter) or exploitation (in violation of section 48 of the Quebec Charter) may file a complaint with the Commission des droits de la personne et des droits de la jeunesse. The complaint may also be filed by an organization dedicated to the defense of human rights and freedoms or to the welfare of a group of persons, with the consent of the alleged victim or victims.

If, following the commission's investigation, the Commissioners adopt a resolution whereby they conclude that there is sufficient evidence to support the complaint, corrective measures may be suggested. If these measures are not respected, the Commission may represent the alleged victim before the Human Rights Tribunal. If these measures are not respected, the Commission may represent the alleged victim before the Human Rights Tribunal.

If the Commission rejects the complaint, because the Commission considers it unfounded, the alleged victim cannot access the Human Rights Tribunal. However, he/she may, on his or her own, file an action before an ordinary court (the Court of Quebec or the Superior Court of Quebec), in conformity with the court's respective jurisdictional competence.

==== Initiating proceedings ====
The proceedings before the Human Rights Tribunal are generally initiated by the Commission des droits de la personne et des droits de la jeunesse. The costs of the proceedings are assumed by the commission, and without costs for the alleged victim.

According to section 84 of the Quebec Charter, the alleged victim and/or the organization that had filed the complaint with the commission on his or her behalf, may possibly initiate proceedings before the Human Rights Tribunal at their own expense. However, they can only initiate proceedings before the Tribunal on their own initiative if the commission, at the conclusion of its investigation, considers that even though there is sufficient evidence to support the complaint, the commission will nevertheless not represent the complainant before the Tribunal. The alleged victim and/or the complainant organization must initiate proceedings before the Tribunal within 90 days of having received a notification from the Commission of its decision to close the file.

=== Remedial powers ===
The Quebec legislator granted significant remedial powers to the Tribunal, as specified in sections 49 and 80 of the Quebec Charter. Pursuant to section 49 of the Quebec Charter, the Tribunal can condemn the guilty party to pay damages to the victim(s) for material and/or moral prejudices suffered. It is worth noting that, contrary to other current laws in concerning Human Rights, the Quebec Charter does not set a maximum limit on the amount that can be accorded for damages by the Human Rights Tribunal.

Section 49 of the Quebec Charter also stipulates that the Tribunal can condemn the guilty party to punitive damages if the interference with the rights or freedoms of the victim is intentional.

In addition, as per sections 49 and 80 of the Quebec Charter, the Tribunal can issue orders that will put an end to the violation of the victim's rights. The order may involve an obligation to engage in an activity or, on the contrary, the prohibition to engage in an activity.

The power to issue orders is, however, not limited to putting an end to the violation of the victim's rights. In the judgment Bombardier, the Supreme Court of Canada acknowledged the Tribunal's power to issue orders in the public interest.

Note that when a law, a regulation, a directive or the norm of a public organization is the source of the discrimination, the Tribunal can declare the said disposition unenforceable in regard to the parties concerned, i.e. declare the disposition inapplicable only with regard to the victim. The Tribunal, however, cannot declare the disposition invalid or unconstitutional, as the power to do so falls under the jurisdiction of superior courts.

== Proof and procedure ==
The Tribunal was created with the objective of ensuring greater accessibility to justice and increased efficiency in the adjudication process. Therefore, the rules of evidence and procedure applicable to the Tribunal are characterized by their flexibility.

The Human Rights Tribunal hears cases in all of the judicial districts, even though its offices are located in the Montreal Courthouse.

=== Proof ===
The preponderance of evidence is the standard of proof applicable before the Human Rights Tribunal; i.e., the Tribunal must be convinced that a particular version of events is more likely to be true than not true.

The Tribunal generally applies the rules of evidence provided for in the Civil Code of Quebec. However, section 123 of the Quebec Charter stipulates that "[t]he Tribunal, though bound by the general principles of justice, may admit any evidence useful and relevant to the application submitted to it and allow any means of proof".

=== Procedure ===
The Quebec Charter and the Regulation of the Human Rights Tribunal stipulate the procedure applicable to the Human Rights Tribunal. Furthermore, section 113 of the Quebec Charter stipulates that the Code of Civil Procedure applies, adapted as required, in the absence of a specific procedure in the Charter or in the Regulation.

==== Proceedings ====
The Proceedings Before the Human Rights Tribunal

Proceedings before the Tribunal are initiated with the filing of an application to institute proceedings, followed by the submission of the claimant's factum which must be filed within 15 days of the filing of the application to institute proceedings. The accused party can file its factum within 30 days of reception of the claimant's factum. However, as stipulated in the Quebec Charter, the accused party is not obliged to file a factum. When the procedures are received or at the expiry date for the filing of the defendant's factum, a date is set for the trial.

In order to promote access to justice regarding Human Rights, the Tribunal has made available, on its website, procedure templates and forms (for the application and for the factums) as well as guides and explanations for those who are representing themselves before the Tribunal.

==== Filing procedural documents ====
The application is filed at the office (counter) of the Court of Quebec in the judicial district where the defendant lives or has their principal place of business. All the procedural documents must then be filed in that same judicial district. Save for certain exceptions, the hearing will take place in the Courthouse of that district.

==== Contesting Tribunal judgments ====
After the trial or the hearing of a preliminary or interlocutory application, the Tribunal will render a written decision.

The final judgments, i.e. those that put an end to the litigation, may be appealed subject to leave to appeal from the Court of Appeal.

Subject to a condition set out in section 128 of the Charter, it is possible to ask the Tribunal to revise or revoke a decision it has rendered, provided that the decision has not been executed nor appealed. The Superior Court can also revise the decisions of the Tribunal pertaining to questions of jurisdiction only.

== See also ==
- Quebec Charter of Human Rights and Freedoms
- Civil Code of Quebec
- National Assembly of Quebec
- Gil Rémillard
- Commission des droits de la personne et des droits de la jeunesse
- Government of Quebec
- SPVM
- Centre Mont-Royal
- Bar of Quebec
- Court of Quebec
- Quebec Court of Appeal
- Superior Court of Quebec
- Montreal Courthouse
