= Mouvement laïque québécois v Saguenay (City) =

- Supreme Court of Canada

Hearing: 14 October 2014 Judgment: 15 April 2015
- Full case name: Mouvement laïque québécois and Alain Simoneau v City of Saguenay and Jean Tremblay
- Citations: 2015 SCC 16
- Docket No.: 35496
- Prior history: APPEAL from Mouvement laïque québécois v Saguenay (City), 2013 QCCA 936
- Ruling: Appeal allowed.

Holding
- Prayers of a religious nature recited during or before city council sessions breach the state's duty of neutrality and may constitute discrimination.

Court membership
- Chief Justice: Beverley McLachlin; Puisne Justices: Rosalie Abella, Marshall Rothstein, Thomas Cromwell, Michael Moldaver, Andromache Karakatsanis, Richard Wagner, Clément Gascon

Reasons given
- Majority: Gascon J, joined by McLachlin CJ and LeBel, Rothstein, Cromwell, Moldaver, Karakatsanis and Wagner JJ
- Concurrence: Abella J

Mouvement laïque québécois v Saguenay (City) [2015] S.C.R., 2015 SCC 41 is a Canadian administrative law case, dealing with the effect of a prayer held at the beginning of a municipal council session on the state's duty of neutrality in relation to freedom of conscience and freedom of religion. The decision upheld an earlier decision by the Quebec Human Rights Tribunal, ordering the Saguenay council to stop recitation of the prayer and rendering the by-law supporting such prayer inoperable, as well as imposing $30,000 in compensatory and punitive damages. The ruling has implications for all levels of government in Canada, and several cities announced changes to drop the use of prayers before municipal meetings.

== Background ==
The City of Saguenay mayor Jean Tremblay (2002 to 2015) opened public city council sessions by reciting the following prayer:

O God, eternal and almighty, from Whom all power and wisdom flow, we are assembled here in Your presence to ensure the good of our city and its prosperity. We beseech You to grant us the enlightenment and energy necessary for our deliberations to promote the honour and glory of Your holy name and the spiritual and material [well-being] of our city. Amen.

Tremblay would also make the sign of the Cross while saying "in the name of the Father, the Son and the Holy Spirit," in the Roman Catholic tradition. Council chambers in La Baie and Chicoutimi, two communities amalgamated with Saguenay, featured a crucifix and a Sacred Heart emblem.

In 2006, Alain Simoneau, an atheist who regularly attended council meetings, asked Tremblay to stop the prayers, claiming that they infringed on his freedom of conscience. When Tremblay refused, the Mouvement laïque québécois (MLQ), a non-profit organization supporting secularization, filed a complaint with the Commission des droits de la personne et des droits de la jeunesse on his behalf. In 2008, Saguenay's city council passed a by-law amending the language of the prayer and scheduling the prayer before the official opening of council sessions; however, the councillors continued to act as before. That same year, the Commission adopted a resolution indicating its intention to exercise its discretion not to seize a tribunal, despite the fact that it believed that there was sufficient evidence to prove discrimination, leaving the possibility for the plaintiff to represent himself before the Human Rights Tribunal of Quebec, as provided by section 84 of the Quebec Charter of Human Rights and Freedoms.

=== At the Quebec Human Rights Tribunal ===
In 2011, the Human Rights Tribunal heard Simoneau's complaint, which alleged a violation of his section 3 and 10 rights under Quebec Charter of Human Rights and Freedoms. The Tribunal determined that the prayer was religious in nature and that it interfered with Simoneau's freedom of conscience and religion in a discriminatory fashion. The Tribunal found also that the by-law violated the state's duty of neutrality and rendered it invalid.

A Léger poll, found that 61% of the population of Saguenay-Lac-Saint-Jean, disagreed with the decision of the Human Rights Tribunal, only 34% of respondents agree with the judgment.

=== At the Quebec Court of Appeal ===
In 2013, the Quebec Court of Appeal heard the City of Saguenay's appeal. Gagnon JA, writing for the court, held that the standard of review for appeals from the Tribunal was correctness. Gagnon JA found also that the Tribunal had made a palpable and overriding error in accepting expert testimony from what he held to be a non-objective source. Gagnon JA conceived of state neutrality as a "benevolent neutrality", held that the prayer did not violate the state's duty of neutrality since it was universal in nature, and that the crucifix and Sacred Heart were works of art that did not carry a religious connotation. Gagnon allowed the appeal, holding that there had been no discrimination against Simoneau.

== Judgment of the SCC ==
All nine justices of the Supreme Court of Canada (SCC) concurred in the result. Abella J's reasons differed only on the issue of the standard of review chosen.

=== Standard of review ===
Gascon J, writing for the majority, held that the Quebec Court of Appeal had erred by conflating the judicial review standard of correctness and the appellate standard of palpable and overriding error standard. Instead, Gascon J found that "where a court reviews a decision of a specialized administrative tribunal, the standard of review must be determined on the basis of administrative law principles", which applied to the Tribunal since it was not a court under the Courts of Justice Act. The existence of a right of appeal from the Tribunal was not determinative of the standard of review. Gascon J held that the correctness standard applied to the issue of the state's duty of neutrality, but that the Quebec Court of Appeal had erred by applying it to the other issues at bar. The determination of whether the prayer was religious, whether it violated Simoneau's freedom of conscience and was discriminatory, and whether the expert evidence was admissible should be assessed using the reasonableness standard of review.

In her concurring reasons, Abella J wrote that courts should not impose different standards of review for different issues in one decision, suggesting that this "creates yet another confusing caveat" to the Court's reasons in Dunsmuir v New Brunswick. Abella J supported instead a holistic approach that would consider whether the whole of a decision is reasonable or correct, arguing that this would ensure a "principled and sustainable foundation" for the standard of review analysis.

=== Religious symbols ===
Gascon J agreed with the Quebec Court of Appeal's finding that the Tribunal was not entitled to consider the religious symbols, since the Human Rights Commission had not investigated them. However, Gascon J also held that the Court of Appeal erred by expanding their own jurisdiction to consider the issue.

=== Prayer ===
Gascon J held that "sponsorship of one religious tradition by the state in breach of its duty of neutrality amounts to discrimination against all other such traditions", and that non-belief is equally protected under religious freedom, per R v Big M Drug Mart Ltd. Gascon J wrote that state neutrality is required so as to prevent discrimination, since a state-held belief would deny citizens' "equal worth". Gascon J thus rejected the Quebec Court of Appeal's conception of "benevolent neutrality", instead holding that factual situations that "reveal an intention to profess, adopt or favour one belief to the exclusion of all others" will breach religious neutrality, regardless of the "traditional character" of the act.

Instead, the Court wrote that Canadian society has evolved and given rise to a "concept of neutrality according to which the state must not interfere in religion and beliefs." "This neutrality requires that the state neither favour nor hinder any particular belief, and the same holds true for non-belief. It requires that the state abstain from taking any position and thus avoid adhering to a particular belief. ... [Therefore] it may not use its powers in such a way as to promote the participation of certain believers or non-believers in public life to the detriment of others." The practice of opening Council sessions with prayers, it held, constituted such a misuse of its powers.

Gascon J held that the Tribunal's finding that the prayer was religious in nature was reasonable, since the wording of the amended by-law demonstrated the City of Saguenay's support for the individual religions of the practicing councillors. Further, he held that the Court of Appeal erred by deciding to reject the expert witness' evidence. Gascon J held also that the Tribunal's finding that the prayer amounted to an exclusion based on religion was reasonable, since it involved state actors practicing a religious act in the course of their duties. Further, Mayor Tremblay's statements at the Tribunal indicated that the prayer constituted council's attempt to "profess one religion to the exclusion of all others".

Finally, Gascon J held that Simoneau's rights to freedom of conscience and religion had been breached, since the "price for [non-participation]... was isolation, exclusion and stigmatization". The decision to move the prayer before the official start of the council session did not accommodate those of other faiths but rather exacerbated discrimination, since it would effectively reveal that he was a non-believer. Gascon J thus concluded that the Tribunal's decision regarding discrimination was a reasonable one.

Gascon J held that the requirement of state neutrality did not amount to preferential treatment toward atheism or agnosticism, summarizing the issue as follows:

[134] In short, there is a distinction between unbelief and true neutrality. True neutrality presupposes abstention, but it does not amount to a stand favouring one view over another. No such inference can be drawn from the state's silence.

Gascon J equally rejected the argument that the prayer was sufficiently universal as to encompass all religions, since the prayer was still religious in nature, which violates the principle of neutrality. Gascon J rejected further arguments by analogy to the prayer recited in the House of Commons of Canada, holding that there had not been sufficient evidence led to discuss the issue. Gascon J also dismissed the argument that the preamble to the Charter of Rights and Freedoms, which acknowledges that "Canada is founded upon principles that recognize the supremacy of God", had bearing on the issue. Gascon J held that the preamble "cannot lead to an interpretation of freedom of conscience and religion that authorizes the state to consciously profess a theistic faith".

=== Orders and remedies ===
Gascon J held that the Tribunal's decision rendering the by-law inoperable and ordering Saguenay council to stop recitation of the prayer was legitimate, and that its imposition of $30,000 in compensatory and punitive damages was reasonable.

== Influence ==
In response to the Supreme Court's decision, several cities, including Regina, Saskatchewan, Ottawa, Calgary and Edmonton, suspended prayers before their city council meetings. Other cities, including Halifax and Sarnia, reviewed their practices. Winnipeg council decided to continue praying at the beginning of council sessions.

== See also ==
- List of Supreme Court of Canada cases (McLachlin Court)
- Town of Greece v. Galloway: a similar American court case
