= Marcel J. Mélançon =

Canadian bioethicist and academic (1938–2026)

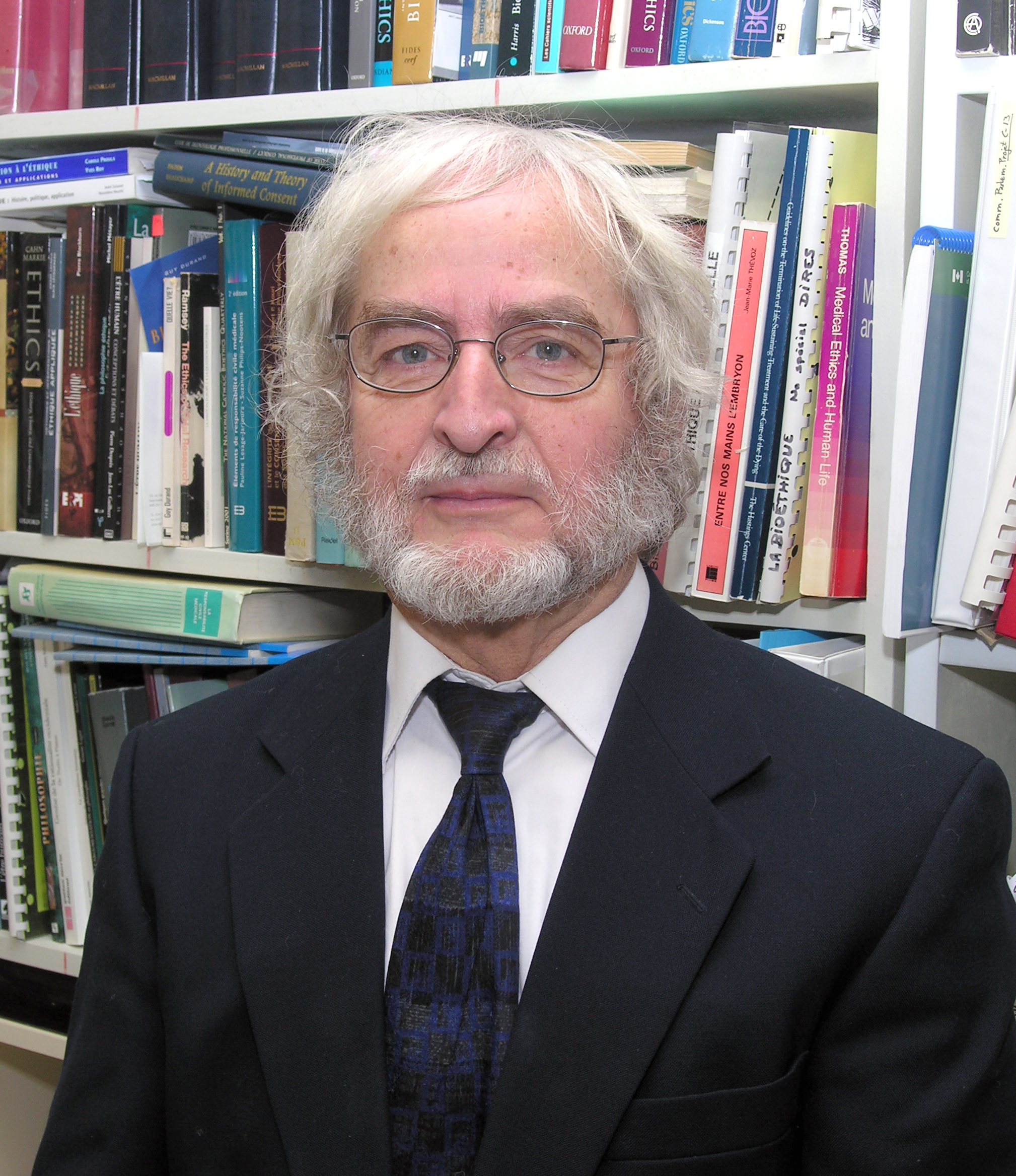
- Mélançon in 2010
- Born: Joseph Marcel Mélançon; 3 April 1938; Saint-Barnabé, Quebec, Canada
- Died: 1 August 2026 (aged 88); Saguenay, Quebec, Canada
- Education: Collège Jean-de-Brébeuf; Université Laval (MS); University of Fribourg (PhD)
- Occupations: Bioethicist; Academic

Marcel J. Mélançon (3 April 1938 – 1 August 2026) was a Canadian bioethicist and academic. He led numerous research groups over his decades-long career.

== Life and career ==
Born in Saint-Barnabé on 3 April 1938, Mélançon grew up in a family of farmers and attended classical college at the Collège Jean-de-Brébeuf. He earned a Master of Science from the Université Laval and a Doctor of Philosophy from the University of Fribourg, writing a thesis on Albert Camus. In 1978, he began teaching at the University of Sudbury. He left Sudbury two years later and joined the Faculty of Philosophy at the Université Laval. He directed the Groupe de recherche en éthique médicale from 1983 to 1985. At that time, he advocated for better integration of philosophers into bioethical issues, a field he perceived as being primarily occupied by jurists, theologians, and scientists. He also began collaborations with Raymond D. Lambert. In 1985, he joined the Université du Québec à Chicoutimi (UQAC).

At UQAC, Mélançon led the Groupe de recherche en génétique et éthique du Québec. The group focused on screening for genetic diseases particularly prevalent in Quebec. In 1986, he co-founded the Société canadienne de bioéthique, which fused with the Société canadienne de bioéthique médicale two years later to form the Canadian Bioethics Society. In 1991, he created the Mouvement Universel de la Responsabilité Scientifique at the request of Jean Dausset. He also drafted Dausset's closing address at the International Seminar on Bioethics in Japan in 1992. In 1996, he established a class on bioethics at UQAC. In the early 2000s, he served on the National Council on Ethics in Human Research. His works were made available on Les Classiques des sciences sociales. In August 2017, he held an exhibition at the Pulperie de Chicoutimi of plastic art he created.

Mélançon died in Saguenay on 1 August 2026, at the age of 88.

== Awards ==
- Prix Laure Gaudreault, mérite scientifique régional du SLSJ (1992)
- Prix Plourde-Gaudreault, mérite scientifique régional du SLSJ (1996)
- Prix de l'Association des biologistes du Québec (1999)
