= Bouchard-Taylor Commission =

2007–08 commission in Quebec, Canada

The Bouchard-Taylor commission (named for its two co-chairmen), officially the Quebec Consultation Commission on Accommodation Practices Related to Cultural Differences, was created on 8 February 2007 by Quebec premier Jean Charest. Its mandate was to examine questions related to reasonable accommodation allowed because of cultural or religious differences in Quebec.

== History ==
The commission was chaired by philosopher Charles Taylor and historian and sociologist Gérard Bouchard. Its final report was made public on 22 May 2008, and the commission wound up its operations on 18 June 2008.

The commission conducted hearings in various Quebec regions. The committee listened to individuals, organizations, and so-called experts on Quebec identity, religion, and integration of cultural communities (minority groups). Before formal proceedings began, Bouchard and Taylor said they heard in focus groups across the province that there was insecurity among Quebec's traditional ethnic French population. They believed that hearings would help with educating the public; for instance, they thought the perception of Muslim influence was higher among some groups than is justified by data. Taylor underlined that Quebecers need to show an "openness and generosity of spirit" for 'cultural communities. As well, the report recommended that accommodation be made in public schools to allow students who want to wear religious attire in class, such as the hijab, kippah or turban, to do so.

The Bouchard–Taylor report recommended that judges, Crown prosecutors, prison guards and police officers refrain from wearing any religious attire or symbols. "We believe that a majority of Quebecers accept that a uniform prohibition applying to all government employees regardless of the nature of their position is excessive, but want those employees who occupy positions that embody at the highest level the necessary neutrality of the state ... to impose on themselves a form of circumspection concerning the expression of their religious convictions", Bouchard and Taylor wrote.

== Aftermath ==
In 2017, in the aftermath of the Charter of Quebecois Values debate, Taylor stated that he no longer supports that opinion and said it was misinterpreted by many politicians. The Bouchard–Taylor report deliberately did not include teachers, civil servants and health-care professionals among those that should be forbidden to wear religious symbols.

The commission also recommended that the crucifix in the National Assembly, placed above the Speaker's chair by Premier Maurice Duplessis, be removed to another part of the building. This recommendation was resisted at the time (the National Assembly unanimously adopted a motion defending the maintenance of the crucifix), but the crucifix was eventually removed in July 2019. A 2019 poll found that over 55% of Quebecers supported the crucifix remaining.

In a 2026 interview, Bouchard, who opposed the Act respecting the laicity of the State, stated that former Premier François Legault distorted the definition of the commission when he said that the act was based on the Bouchard–Taylor report.

== See also ==
- Act respecting the laicity of the State
- Hérouxville
