= Quebec (Commission des droits de la personne et des droits de la jeunesse) v Boisbriand (City of) =

Judgement of the Supreme Court of Canada

Quebec (Commission des droits de la personne et des droits de la jeunesse) v Boisbriand (City of), 2000 SCC 27, [2000] 1 S.C.R. 665, is a leading Canadian civil rights decision of the Supreme Court of Canada. The Court considered the nature of a handicap in law and found that a handicap is not merely a biomedical condition but rather can exist as a perceived limitation or social construct.

The decision arises from two separate claims by individuals for discrimination under the Quebec Charter of Human Rights and Freedoms. Réjeanne Mercier was refused employment with the city of Montreal as a Gardener-horticulturalist on the grounds that her medical condition involving chronic back pains would be too costly and would interfere with her long-term employment. Palmerino Troilo was a police officer for the city of Boisbriand. He was dismissed after missing work due to having Crohn's disease.

== Judgment of the Court ==
Justice L'Heureux-Dube wrote the reasons for a unanimous Court and dismissed the appeal.

The issue focused on the interpretation of the word "handicap" in the Quebec Charter. She stated that given the Charter's quasi-constitutional status it must be given a liberal and purposive interpretation. A handicap can exist outside of functional limitations. There is also a subjective component on which there can be discrimination.

== See also ==
- List of Supreme Court of Canada cases
