= Gosselin v Quebec (AG) =

Canadian claim for a right to social assistance

{{{case-name}}}
- Supreme Court of Canada

Hearing: October 29, 2001 Judgment: December 19, 2002
- Full case name: Louise Gosselin v. The Attorney General of Quebec
- Citations: [2002] 4 SCR 429, 2002 SCC 84

Holding
- There is violation of section 15(1) equality right for a law denying full social assistance benefits for youth.

Court membership
- Chief Justice: Beverley McLachlin; Puisne Justices: Claire L'Heureux-Dubé, Charles Gonthier, Frank Iacobucci, John C. Major, Michel Bastarache, Ian Binnie, Louise Arbour, Louis LeBel

Reasons given
- Majority: McLachlin, joined by Gonthier, Iacobucci, Major and Binnie
- Dissent: Bastarache
- Dissent: LeBel
- Dissent: Arbour
- Dissent: L’Heureux-Dubé

Laws applied
- Law v Canada, [1999] 1 SCR 497 (McLachlin)

Gosselin v Quebec (AG) [2002] 4 SCR 429, 2002 SCC 84, is the first claim under section 7 of the Canadian Charter of Rights and Freedoms to a right to an adequate level of social assistance. The Supreme Court of Canada rejected the Charter challenge against a Quebec law excluding citizens under age 30 from receiving full social security benefits.

== Background ==
Between 1984 and 1989, a period of alarming and growing unemployment among young adults, under section 29(a) of the Social Aid Regulation (Règlement sur l’aide sociale), the Quebec government provided those who were single, unemployed and under 30 years old with $170 per month in social assistance, which amounted to only a third of the regular benefits. Full benefits were only available if the individuals would participate in one of three employability programs: On-the-job Training, Community Work or Remedial Education. The objective behind it was to encourage youth to find work or go to school. According to the Supreme Court of Canada, the new scheme was based on the philosophy that the most effective way to encourage and enable young people to join the workforce was to make increased benefits conditional on participating in one of three of the workfare programs.

Louise Gosselin was under age 30 during the period from 1984 to 1989. She struggled with psychological problems and drug and alcohol addictions and attempted to work as a cook, waitress, seller and nurses' assistant, among many other jobs. She was homeless periodically, lived in an unheated apartment for one winter, and when she rented a room at a boarding house, she was left with no money for food.

Gosselin brought a class action on behalf of 75,000 individuals against the Quebec government for violation of her section 15 equality rights and Section Seven of the Canadian Charter of Rights and Freedoms right to life, liberty and security of the person. As well, she claimed that her social rights in section 45 of the Quebec Charter of Rights and Freedoms were violated.

The Québec Court of Appeal was divided but ruled that the regulation did not violate the Canadian or Quebec Charter. Two judges found a violation of section 15 of the Canadian Charter, but only one found that it could not be saved by section 1. Another dissenting judge found a violation of section 45 of the Quebec Charter.

== Supreme Court's opinion ==
The Supreme Court decided by 5–4 that there was no violation of section 15; by 7–2 that there was no violation of section 7; and by 6–1 that there was no violation of section 45 of the Quebec Charter of Rights and Freedoms (two justices ruled that section 45 was unenforceable in this situation). The majority opinion was written by McLachlin CJ.

=== Section 15 ===
McLachlin, with Gonthier, Iacobucci, Major, and Binnie JJ concurring, found there was not violation of section 15.

In applying the analytical framework for section 15 from Law v Canada, McLachlin identified the government purpose was to promote short-term autonomy among youth. The government was attempting to create an incentive for young people to participate in employment programs.

McLachlin rejected the claim that the purpose "did not correspond to the actual needs and circumstances of the individuals" and that it effectively stereotyped youth. Rather it was "an affirmation of their potential". The majority found that youth do not suffer from any pre-existing disadvantage and were not more susceptible to negative preconceptions.

McLachlin found that there was not enough evidence of harmful effects of the law. Rather, the claimants were merely representative of some individuals who had "fallen through the cracks".

Furthermore, the majority found there was no evidence to show that those who wanted to participate in the employment programs were refused participation. Thus, there could be no finding of discrimination by adverse effects.

=== Section 7 ===
McLachlin, with Gonthier, Iacobucci, Major, Binnie and LeBel JJ concurring, found that there was no violation of section 7.

The primary reason for McLachlin's finding that there was no violation was because Gosselin was unable to discharge her legal burden of proof.

[Ms. Gosselin had] not demonstrated that the government treated her as less worthy than older welfare recipients simply because it conditioned increased welfare payments on her participation in programs designed specifically to integrate her into the workforce and to promote her long-term selfsufficiency.

In examination of section 7, McLachlin also found that there was not enough evidence here either:

The question therefore is not whether section 7 has ever been —or will ever be— recognized as creating positive rights. Rather, the question is whether the present circumstances warrant a novel application of section 7 as the basis for a positive state obligation to guarantee adequate living standards.
I conclude that they do not.... I do not believe that there is sufficient evidence in this case to support the proposed interpretation of section 7. I leave open the possibility that a positive obligation to sustain life, liberty, or security of the person may be made out in special circumstances. However, this is not such a case. The impugned program contained compensatory "workfare" provisions, and the evidence of actual hardship is wanting. The frail platform provided by the facts of this case cannot support the weight of a positive state obligation of citizen support.

== Dissenting opinions ==
=== Section 7 ===
Arbour JJ held in dissent that section 7 places positive obligations on the government.

=== Section 15 ===
Bastarache wrote the dissenting opinion on section 15 with L'Heureux-Dubé, Arbour and LeBel JJ concurring for the most part.

In Bastarache's opinion, when he considered the existence of any pre-existing disadvantages, he claims McLachlin's assumption that persons under 30 have an easier time finding work was a stereotype that young welfare recipients do not suffer any special disadvantages, as none of the facts suggests any such conclusion. He concedes that there is no evidence that youth are more disadvantaged than other welfare recipients, but the marginalized state of all welfare recipients warrants giving them extra consideration.

When examining the correspondence between the treatment of the claimant and her actual needs, Bastarache noted that law can differentiate only between groups when there is a genuine difference. On the facts, he saw no evidence of any real difference. He rejected the assumption that youth receive help from their families more than older people and found there is not enough difference to warrant reducing funding to create such substandard living conditions. That unjustified detriment alone should be sufficient to find a violation of section 15. He further rejected the suggestion that the government's good intention (it was "for their own good") should have any bearing on the reasoning despite McLachlin's claim otherwise. Such reasoning should be left to section 1 analysis.

Bastarache further took issue with the government's attempt to provide employment programs, as so few were able to stay in the program to receive full benefits. Less than 11% of youth on social assistance were in the program at any one time. Inevitably, all youth were forced to live on the third benefit for at least some period of time. It was because all youth suffered in such a precarious position that their dignity was harmed and equality rights violated.

In considering whether the violation could be saved under section 1, Bastarache acknowledged the need to give the government deference however, the government failed to show that the legislation was minimally impairing of the claimant's rights. There were many reasonable alternatives available that would not have caused as much harm to persons under 30. For example, there was no evidence that increased funding would have foiled the government's objective. Furthermore, Bastarache noted many flaws in the program's execution that resulted in significant harm.

== Concurring opinion ==
=== Section 15 ===
Justice Bastarache concurred with the majority finding that the law did not violate section 7 but offered a different reason for why that was the case:

The appellant ... argues that this Court has found that respect for human dignity underlies most if not all of the rights protected under the Charter. Undoubtedly, I agree that respect for the dignity of all human beings is an important, if not foundational, value in this or any society, and that the interpretation of the Charter may be aided by taking such values into account. However, this does not mean that the language of the Charter can be totally avoided by proceeding to a general examination of such values or that the court can through the process of judicial interpretation change the nature of the right. As held in Blencoe "[W]hile notions of dignity and reputation underlie many Charter rights, they are not stand-alone rights that trigger s. 7 in and of themselves." A purposive approach to Charter interpretation, while coloured by an overarching concern with human dignity, democracy and other such Charter values, must first and foremost look to the purpose of the section in question. Without some link to the language of the Charter, the legitimacy of the entire process of Charter adjudication is brought into question.

== See also ==
- List of Supreme Court of Canada cases (McLachlin Court)
