= BALSAC (database) =

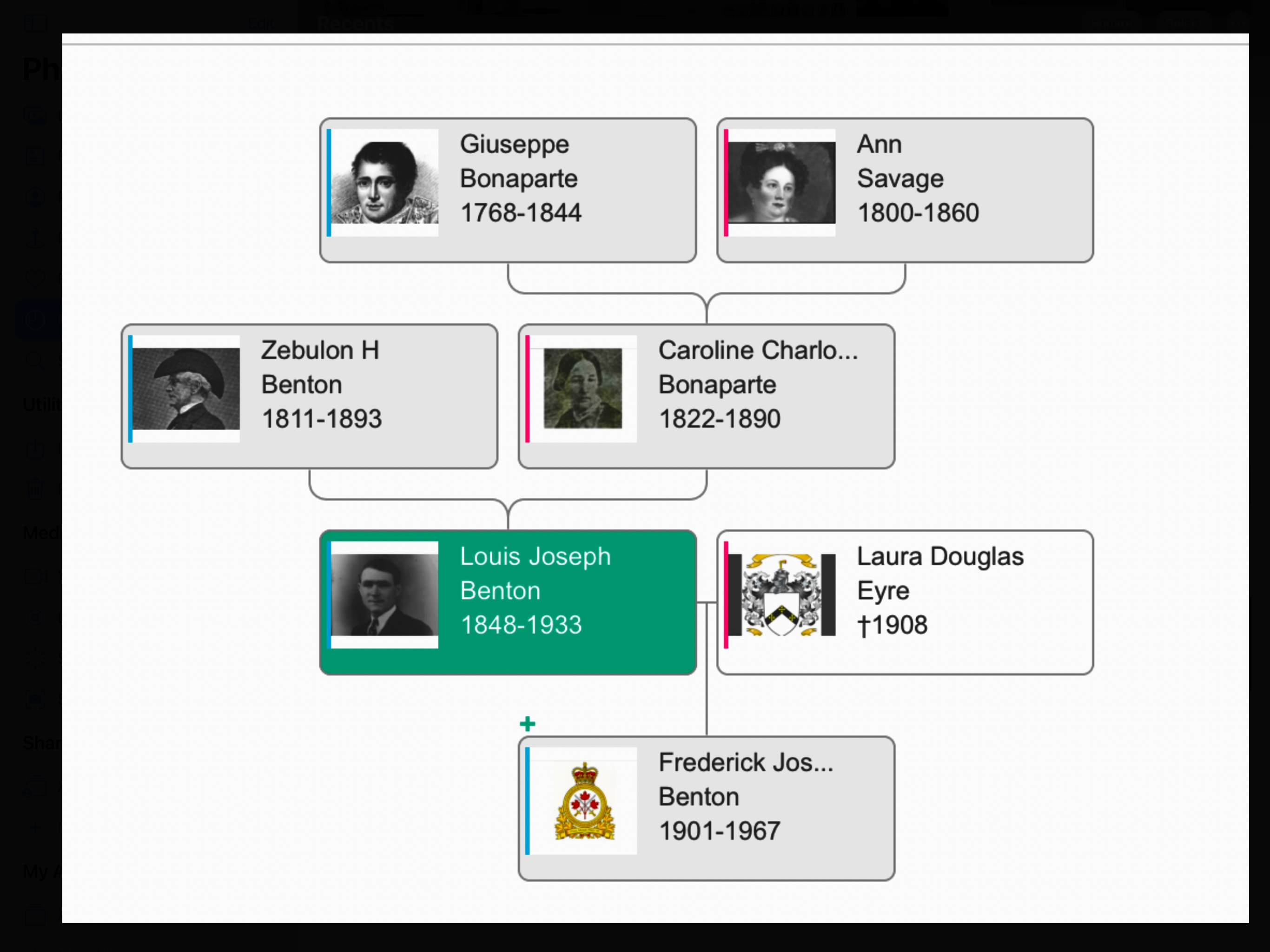
Descendants of Napoleon, according to BALSAC

BALSAC is a population database that allows for the creation of genealogical histories from Quebec, covering individuals from within the province's territory from the beginning of European settlement in the 17th century to today. The database is named after the first letters of the regions it first included.

== History ==
BALSAC was created in 1972 at the Université du Québec à Chicoutimi in partnership with Université Laval, McGill University, and the Université de Montréal on the initiative of Gérard Bouchard. The data are derived from vital records, mostly marriage certificates, that are connected through record linkage. These records can be combined for studies in disciplines such as human genetics, demography, geography, sociology, and history. The first milestone of the project was to recreate the population of Saguenay–Lac-Saint-Jean from over 660,000 baptisms, marriages, and deaths in the region between 1838 and 1971. The database was expanded progressively to the entirety of Quebec's territory for the 19th and 20th centuries by matching data to marriage certificates, with the exception of a few regions for which baptismal and burial records were already digitized (Charlevoix and the Iles-de-la-Madeleine in part). In 2016, the linkage of nearly all Catholic marriages (around 1.25 million records) in Quebec from 1800 to 1940 was completed.
