= Godbout v Longueuil (City of) =

- Supreme Court of Canada

Hearing: May 28, 1997 Judgment: October 31, 1997
- Full case name: City of Longueuil v. Michèle Godbout
- Citations: [1997] 3 S.C.R. 844, 152 D.L.R. (4th) 577, C.R.R. (2d) 1
- Docket No.: 24990
- Prior history: ruled in favor of respondent, [1989] R.J.Q. 1511 (QC.C.S.), 48 M.P.L.R. 307, 12 C.H.R.R. D/141; repealed on appeal, [1995] R.J.Q. 2561 (QC.C.A.), 31 M.P.L.R. (2d) 130, [1995] Q.J. Nos. 686 and 874 (QL), 1995 CanLII 4750
- Ruling: For Godbout. Appeal and cross-appeal dismissed.

Court membership
- Chief Justice: Antonio Lamer; Puisne Justices: Gérard La Forest, Claire L'Heureux-Dubé, John Sopinka, Charles Gonthier, Peter Cory, Beverley McLachlin, Frank Iacobucci, John C. Major

Reasons given
- Majority: La Forest J. (paras. 15-111), joined by L’Heureux-Dubé and McLachlin JJ.
- Concurrence: Major J. (paras. 1-14), joined by Lamer C.J. and Sopinka J.
- Concurrence: Cory J. (paras. 112-119), joined by Gonthier and Iacobucci J.

Laws applied
- Quebec Charter of Human Rights and Freedoms; Brasserie Labatt ltée v. Villa, [1995] R.J.Q. 73

Godbout v Longueuil (City of), [1997] 3 S.C.R. 844 is a leading Supreme Court of Canada decision where the Court found that the city of Longueuil's requirement that all permanent employees of the city must reside within the municipality was in violation of the Quebec Charter of Human Rights and Freedoms.

== Background ==
Michèle Godbout was hired as a dispatcher for the Longueuil police force. As part of her employment she was required to sign a declaration that she would reside within the city and if she were to move outside of the city her employment would be terminated without notice. Initially she had lived within the city but soon bought a house in the nearby town of Chambly. When she refused to move back in she was fired.

Before the Superior Court of Quebec, the parties argued primarily as to whether the Quebec Charter of Human Rights and Freedoms and the Canadian Charter of Rights and Freedoms applied in this case. Judge Turmel ruled that because the employment contract constituted a matter of private law between an employer (here the city of Longueuil) and an employee, neither charters applied, in so far as such rights as granted by the charters can, under civil law be willingly waived by contract.

== Reasons of the court ==
Justice La Forest, writing for the Court in a plurality opinion, held that the restriction on residency was unconstitutional.

La Forest found that the selection of a place of residence was within the meaning of "private life" which is protected under section 5 of the Quebec Charter. He held that the city could not justify the infringement under section 9.1 of the Charter, which allows for limitations on the scope of rights.

La Forest also considered the question of whether the Canadian Charter applied to municipalities. He found that it did as they were government entities. He noted that municipalities were run by elected officials and were accountable to the public, they had the power to collect taxes, and they had the power to make laws which they derived from the provincial government. In addressing the municipality's argument that the residency requirement was merely a private employment contract and not a governmental function, La Forest J. found that once a body is labelled governmental, that body cannot use colourable devices or organize activities to avoid Charter responsibility.

La Forest further considered the validity of the law under section 7 of the Canadian Charter. He identified section 7 as protecting personal autonomy which includes the choice of selecting one's home. At no time did Godbout waive that right, even in signing the employment contract that contained the residency restriction. He further found that the restriction did not conform to the principles of fundamental justice as there was no compelling reason to have such a restriction.

Justice La Forest's decision on the Canadian Charter (joined by L’Heureux-Dubé and McLachlin JJ.) does not have legal force, as the six other justices declined to consider the s.7 claim, after likewise finding that the Quebec Charter was violated.

== See also ==
- List of Supreme Court of Canada cases
