= Media weight =

Media weight is a term used in advertising to refer to the size of the audience reached by an advertising campaign. Media weight is determined by the number and placement of advertisements in media such as television commercials, online ads, or billboards.

Media weight is usually expressed in the form of GRP's (Gross Rating Points), AOTS (Average opportunity to see) and reach of target audience. The main use of media weights is to monitor how well the goals of a communication plan are being reached. There are different ways to measure media weight.

== Measurement ==
The most important method in measuring media weight is analysis of records. The analysis is done on basis of television, print and magazines reporting. Television spendings are reported as TAM rates and print as card rates. TV spendings can be analyzed on the basis of program genre, channel type, time duration and total airtime. The print rate analysis is done on the basis of color/monochrome, magazine, issue, placement of ad, month, and other variables.

== Types of brand ==
Research carried out by John Philip Jones, former chairman of the advertising department at the Newhouse School, on the advertising of different brands in 23 countries found that the brands could be classified into two types: profitable brands and investor brands.

=== Profitable brands ===
These are brands that are advertised less in proportion to market share are categorized as profitable brands. These are brands which may have advertised many times previously but at present are enjoying higher market share with less advertising.

=== Investor brands ===
These are brands that are advertised more in proportion to market share. These brands tend to be newly introduced brands, which have less impact on the audience and are in the growth phase of their product lifecycle (PLC) curve.

== Effective frequency and recency ==
In 1995, John Philip Jones talked about the shelf space model of recency in his book When Ads Work. He found that "within a week, a single ad exposure was enough to produce a strong purchasing effect and that subsequent exposures within that week added very little". The task for advertising is therefore to remind the audience about the product.

== See also ==
- Ad tracking
- Marketing mix modeling
