= Mouvement laïque québécois =

Non-profit organisation

The Mouvement laïque québécois (MLQ) (unofficially, the 'Quebec Secular Movement') is a non-profit organisation whose goal is to defend and promote freedom of conscience, separation of church and state, and secularisation of public institutions in Quebec. It was founded in 1981, developing broader goals from an association devoted primarily to the secularisation of public school curriculum in Quebec.

It won a major victory with Mouvement laïque québécois v Saguenay (City) (2015) when the Canadian Supreme Court ruled that it was unconstitutional for the City of Saguenay, Quebec (or any level of government), to open public meetings with prayers, or to have religious symbols in municipal facilities. The Court said that the state must maintain neutrality in public affairs.

== Background ==
The MLQ believes that ethics and religion should not be united within a single school curriculum. Both are taught in public schools within the "ethics and religious culture" curriculum. The MLQ was founded in 1981 by parents who disagreed with the Quebec public school system including only Catholic or Protestant religious education as requirements of the general curriculum; they thought there should be secular alternatives. The MLQ developed from the AQADER association (Quebec association to ensure the application of the right to be exempted from religious education, or "Association québécoise pour l'application du droit à l'exemption de l'enseignement religieux") founded in 1976. MLQ founders wanted an association whose scope would extend beyond the right to exemption, for instance by promoting values such as free thought. Their goal was secularisation of Quebec public institutions.

In 1987, the MLQ collaborated with senator Jacques Hébert to prevent the adoption of a private bill that would have enabled Opus Dei, a Catholic lay organization, to bypass Canadian fiscal law as a religious institution. In the same year, the MLQ petitioned the Federal Department of Justice to withdraw Bibles from courts, so that solemn affirmations would be recognized as valid.

Parliament has passed numerous bills to secularise public school institutions: the Quebec provincial government abandoned its project to restructure school boards on the basis of religion; the constitution was modified to authorize schools and schools boards to become secular or be founded as such; and in 2008 the government dropped an override clause protecting religious education.

Members of the MLQ have challenged other practices at the municipal level; for instance, in 2006 activists filed complaints against the City of Saguenay for Mayor Jean Tremblay's practice of saying a prayer before each City Council meeting; they also objected to the presence of religious symbols in chambers used for municipal business, such as the boardroom for the Baie district. The case attracted international media attention and took several years to unfold in the courts. After a lengthy process, the case reached the Canadian Supreme Court, which in April 2015 ruled that the city's practices were unconstitutional, as they violated protections of freedom of conscience and religion. The court said government at all levels must be neutral in its practices.

This association annually grants the Condorcet-Dessaules award to either a person or an organization whose position or actions represent the association's objectives.

MLQ supports the 2019 CAQ government Bill 21, but they say it doesn't go far enough.

== See also ==
- Freethought Association of Canada
- Mouvement laïque québécois v Saguenay (City)

== Links ==
- Official site
