= Gérard Bouchard =

Canadian historian and sociologist (born 1943)

Gérard Bouchard MSRC
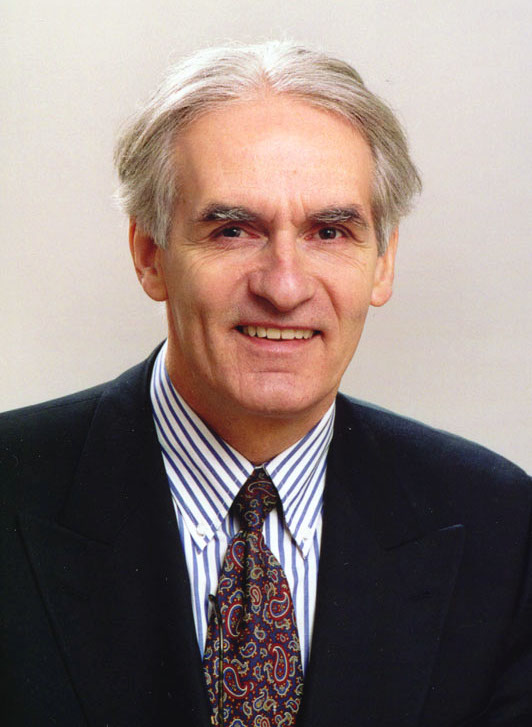
- Born: 26 December 1943 (age 82); Jonquière, Quebec, Canada

Academic background
- Education: Université Laval; University of Paris
- Influences: Fernand Dumont

Academic work
- Discipline: History; sociology
- Institutions: Université Laval; Université du Québec à Chicoutimi

Gérard Bouchard MSRC (born 1943) is a Canadian historian and sociologist affiliated with the Université du Québec à Chicoutimi. Born on 26 December 1943 in Jonquière, Quebec, he obtained his master's degree in sociology from Université Laval in 1968 and later obtained his PhD in history from the University of Paris in 1971. Bouchard had authored, co-authored, edited, or co-edited 26 books, and published 230 papers in scientific journals as of 2005.

Bouchard is the younger brother of Lucien Bouchard, Premier of Quebec from 1996 to 2001. Like his brother, he is a supporter of the Quebec sovereignty movement. In 2007, he was appointed along with Charles Taylor to chair a provincial government inquiry into "reasonable accommodation".

== Timeline ==
- 1971 – He begins teaching at the Université du Québec à Chicoutimi.
- 1972 – He founds the BALSAC database
- 1976 – He founds the Société de recherches sur les populations (SOREP), which became the Institut interuniversitaire de recherche sur les populations (IREP) in 1994.
- 1985 – He receives the Jacques Rousseau Award of the Association canadienne-française pour l'avancement des sciences.
- 1993 – he receives the Prix du Québec (Prix Léon-Gérin for Science) for his contribution to social studies.
- 1996 – He receives the Prix Lionel-Groulx, the Prix François-Xavier-Garneau, and the Prix John A. Macdonald for his work Quelques arpents d'Amérique : Population, économie, famille au Saguenay, 1838–1971.
- 1999 – His work La Nation québécoise au futur et au passé is published.
- 2000 – He receives the Governor General Literary Award for his work Genèse des nations et cultures du Nouveau Monde.
- 2001 – He receives the Prix Gérard-Parizeau.
- 2001 – He receives an honorary doctorate from McGill University.
- 2002 – His first fictional work, Mistouk, is published. A second novel entitled Pikauba followed in 2005.
- 2002 – Was made a Knight of the Legion of Honour by the French government.
- 2003 – His work Les Deux Chanoines – Contradiction et ambivalence dans la pensée de Lionel Groulx is published.
- 2004 – His work La pensée impuissante. Échecs et mythes nationaux canadiens-français, 1850–1960 is published.
- 2006 – He receives an honorary doctorate from the Université de Moncton.
- February 2007 – He is named co-chair, along with the philosopher Charles Taylor, of the Bouchard–Taylor Commission, a one-year Quebec commission to examine the issue of "reasonable accommodation" for minorities in the province.

== See also ==
- Imaginary (sociology)

Awards
Preceded by Fernand Dumont	Jacques Rousseau Award; 1985	Succeeded by Fernand Roberge
Preceded by Charles Taylor	Prix Léon-Gérin; 1993	Succeeded by Jean-Jacques Nattiez
Preceded by Pierre Perrault	Governor General's Award for French-language non-fiction 2000	Succeeded by Renée Dupuis
