= Non obstante =

Statutory provision overriding other laws

A non obstante, also known as a notwithstanding clause, is a legislative device seeking to confer overriding effect upon a particular provision over other conflicting provisions.
