= Les Classiques des sciences sociales =

Les Classiques des sciences sociales (Social sciences classics) is a French digital library based in Saguenay, Quebec (Canada) offering HTML or pdf versions of works whose rights have either fallen into public domain or rightholders giving their consent. It is one of the most visited French library in the world, with about 28 million downloads since its opening in 2000.

The library went online in 2000 with the support of the Université du Québec à Chicoutimi although the teacher behind its creation had been digitizing social sciences texts for his undergraduate students since 1993. As of 2013 the open library gives access to roughly 5500 piece of works in French by 1400 writers coming mainly from France, Belgium, Switzerland and Quebec as well as French speaking Africa and Haiti.

== See also ==
- Digital library
