= Commission des droits de la personne et des droits de la jeunesse =

Quebec government agency

The Commission des droits de la personne et des droits de la jeunesse (French pronunciation: [kɔmisjɔ̃ de dʁwa də la pɛʁsɔn e de dʁwa də la ʒœnɛs], CDPDJ; English: "Human Rights and Youth Rights Commission") is a government agency created by the Quebec Charter of Human Rights and Freedoms in 1975.

The current name and responsibilities of the Commission result from the merging in 1995 of the mandates of the Commission des droits de la personne and the Commission de protection des droits de la jeunesse.

== Mandate ==
The Commission is responsible for promoting and upholding the principles of the Quebec Charter of Human Rights and Freedoms by any appropriate measures, including investigating into possible cases of discrimination and the introduction of litigation.

In addition, it has the mandate to ensure the promotion and the protection of the rights of children recognized by the Youth Protection Act and the Youth Criminal Justice Act.

== Responsibilities ==
The responsibilities of the Commission include, without being limited to, the following:

- make a non-adversary investigation, in accordance with the Charter of Human Rights and Freedoms, into any situation, which appears to the Commission to be either a case of discrimination, harassment or a violation of the right of aged or handicapped persons against exploitation;
- upon an application or of its own motion, pursuant to the Youth Protection Act shall investigate any situation where it has reason to believe that the rights of a child or of a group of children have been encroached upon by persons, establishments or bodies, unless the Court is already seized of it;
- to develop and conduct a program of public information and education relating to human rights and freedoms or to the protection of young persons' rights;
- to point out any provision in the laws of Québec that may be contrary to this Charter and make the appropriate recommendations to the Government;
- to direct and encourage research and publications relating to fundamental rights and freedoms or to the rights of children;
- to make recommendations, in particular to the Minister of Health and Social Services, the Minister of Education and the Minister of Justice concerning the rights of children;
- to receive and examine suggestions, recommendations and requests made to it concerning human rights and freedoms, possibly by inviting any interested person or body of persons to present his or its views before the Commission where it believes that the interest of the public or of a body of persons so requires, with a view to making the appropriate recommendations to the Government;
- to elaborate and implement affirmative actions programs;
- to cooperate with any organization, dedicated to the promotion of human rights and freedoms in or outside Québec.

== See also ==
- Human rights
- Human rights commission
- Politics of Quebec
- Youth rights
